= Roads in Republika Srpska =

A list of roads in Republika Srpska, one of the two constituent entities of Bosnia and Herzgovina.

In October 2026, in a cabinet ruling, the latest set of road classification and numbers were finalized. This ruling followed an earlier ruling which abolished the Yugoslav-era road numbering system and implemented a new nubmering and classification system in November 2019.

In this ruling, the 3 levels of road numbering that were inherited from Yugoslavia and continue to be the standard in Federation of Bosnia and Herzegovina (the other of the two constituent entities of Bosnia and Herzgovina) were retained, A for motorways, M for main highways, and R for regional-level highways. But the numbering was completely overhauled.

== Systems ==
The highways in Republika Srpska are divided into the 5 following groups, based on the level of their significance whose names differ by a code letter and a roman numeral.

- A - "Motorways" (Aуто-пут), classified and designed according to international motorway standards, single-digit codes;
- M-I – "First-class Main Roads" (Магистрални пут првог реда), 3-digit 100 series codes;
- M-II – "Second-class Main Roads" (Магистрални пут другог реда), highways of international significance, 3-digit 500 series codes;
- R-I – "First-Class Regional Roads" (Регионални пут првог реда), 4-digit #100 series codes ();
- R-II – "Second-Class Regional Roads" (Регионални пут другог реда), 4-digit #500 series codes ().

== Motorways ==
Road	Direction	Length			E-Road Designation
Road	Direction	Total	Operational	Under Construction	E-Road Designation
A-1	Gradiška (border with Croatia: D5) – Banja Luka – Mrkonjić Grad – Mlinište (border with FBiH: M-15)	131.3	34.0		E661
A-2	Novi Grad (border with Croatia: D6) – Prijedor – Banja Luka – Doboj	242.0	72.2	110.5	
A-2	Vukosavlje - border with Brčko District a break in the itinerary of this route border with Brčko District - Bijeljina - Sremska Rača (border with Serbia: A7)	242.0	72.2	110.5	
A-3	Makljenovac (border with FBiH: A-1) – Doboj – Vukosavlje (border with FBiH: A-1)	46.6	5.65	5.6	E73

== Main Roads ==
=== First-class Main Roads ===
Road	Direction	Former Designation	E-Road Designation
M-I-100	Otoka (border with FBiH: M-14) – Rudice – Novi Grad – Kostajnica - Kozarska Dubica - Draksenić - Jasenovac (border with Croatia: D232)	M-14	
M-I-101	Gradiška (border with Croatia: D5) - Nova Topola - Dušanovo - Laktaši - Banja Luka - Karanovac - Ugar River (border with FBiH: M-16)	M-16	E661
M-I-102	Draksenić - Vrbaška - Čatrnja - Gradiška - Nova Topola - Razboj Ljevčanski - Srbac - Derventa	M-14.1	
M-I-103	Brod (border with Croatia: D53) - Polje - Derventa - Vrhovi - Šešlije	M-14.1; M-17.2	
M-I-104	Šamac - Grebnice - Obudovac - Lončari (border with Brčko District: M-14.1); Brezovo Polje (border with Brčko District: M-14.1) - Vršani - Dragaljevac - Donja Čađavica - Ljeljenča - Bijeljina - Slobomir (border with Serbia: 20)	M-14.1; M-18.2; R-462a; R-463; R-464	
M-I-105	Šamac (border with Croatia: D7) - Crkvina - Modriča - Jakeš - Podnovlje - Šešlije - Johovac - Rudanka - Doboj - Makljenovac (border with FBiH: M-17)	M-17	E73
M-I-106	Klašnice - Potočani - Prnjavor - Derventa	M-14.1; M-16.1	
M-I-107	Lepnica (border with FBiH: M-1.8) - Lončari - Pelagićevo - Blaževac (border with Brčko District: M-1.8)	M-1.8	
M-I-108	Novi Grad (border with Croatia: D6) - Blagaj - Prijedor - Kozarac - Lamovita - Potkozarje - Banja Luka - Čelinac - Kotor Varoš - Obodnik - Pribinić - Teslić - Vrela (border with FBiH: M-4)	M-4	
M-I-109	Ustiprača - Kopači (border with FBiH: M-20) a break in the itinerary of this route Ustikolina (border with FBiH: M-20) - Foča - Brod na Drini - Vrba - Gacko - Avtovac - Krivača - Podosoje - Bileća - Trebinje - Ljubovo (border with FBiH: M-20)	M-20	
M-I-110	Doboj - Stanić Rijeka (border with FBiH: M-4) a break in the itinerary of this route Caparde (border with FBiH: M-4) - Karakaj (border with Serbia: 26)	M-4	
M-I-111	Sarajevo/Dobrinja (border with FBiH: M-18) - Kula - Krupac - Bogatići (border with FBiH: M-18) a break in the itinerary of this route Trnovo (border with FBiH: M-18) - Dobro Polje - Miljevina - Brod na Drini - Šćepan Polje (border with Montenegro: M-3)	M-18	E762
M-I-112	Velečevo (border with FBiH: M-5) - Zableće - Čađavica - Rogolji - Mrkonjić Grad - Jezero (border with FBiH: M-5)	M-5	E761
M-I-113	Bijeljina - Suvo Polje - Ugljevik - Ugljevička Obrijež - Tobut - Priboj - Potraš (border with FBiH: M-18)	M-18	
M-I-114	Korija (border with FBiH: M-5) - Ljubogošta - Šumbulovac - Podromanija - Rogatica - Sastavci - Ustiprača - Međeđa - Brodar - Višegrad - Dobrun - Donje Vardište (border with Serbia: 28)	M-5; M-19; M-19.3	E761
M-I-115	Sremska Rača (border with Serbia: A7) - Gojsovac - Bijeljina - Janja - Glavičice - Donji Šepak - Karakaj - Zvornik - Drinjača - Konjević Polje - Milići - Vlasenica - Han Pijesak - Sokolac - Podromanija	M-4; M-14.1; M-18; M-19	
M-I-116	Kokorina (border with FBiH: M-6.1) - Nevesinje - Plužine - Gacko	M-6.1	
M-I-117	Trebinje Eastern Bypass (Podgljivlje - Banjevci - Aleksina Međa)	M-6.1	
M-I-118	Poplat (border with FBiH: M-6) - Ljubinje - Strujići (border with FBiH: M-17.6) - Trebinje - Dolovi (border with Montenegro: M-7)	M-6	

=== Second-class Main Roads ===
Road	Direction	Former Designation
M-II-500	Brod - Brusnica Mala (border with FBiH: M-14.1) a break in the itinerary of this route Odžak/Jezero (border with FBiH: M-14.1) - Jakeš - Modriča - Donji Skugrić (border with FBiH: M-14.1) a break in the itinerary of this route Turić (border with FBiH: M-14.1) - Pelagićevo	M-14.1
M-II-501	Kozarska Dubica - Međuvođe - Gornji Jelovac - Prijedor - Koprivna (border with FBiH: M-15)	M-15
M-II-502	Sasina (border with FBiH:R-405) - Stratinska - Bronzani Majdan - Banja Luka	R-405
M-II-503	Rogolji - Donji Baraći - Mlinište (border with FBiH: M-15)	M-15
M-II-504	Konjević Polje - Bratunac - Ljubovija (border with Serbia: 454)	R-454
M-II-505	Kotor Varoš - Mitrovići - Kneževo - Prisika (border with FBiH: R-413)	R-413
M-II-506	Turalići (border with FBiH: M-19.2) - Tišća - Vlasenica	M-19.2
M-II-507	Brodar - Rudo (border with Serbia: 20)	R-467
M-II-508	Ljubogošta - Pale - Podgrab - Prača (border with FBiH: M-5) a break in the itinerary of this route Čemernica (border with FBiH: R-448) - Mesići - Sastavci	M-5
M-II-510	Foča - Dragočava - Godijeno; Branch: Dragočava - Vikoč (border with Montenegro)	M-8

== Regional Roads ==
=== First-class Regional Roads ===
Road	Direction	Former Designation
R-I-1101	Blagaj - Budimlić Japra - Podvidača (border with FBiH: R-404)	R-404
R-I-1102	Arapuša (border with FBiH: R-404a) - Donji Dubovik - Budimlić Japra	R-404a
R-I-1103	Kostajnica (border with Croatia: D30) - Karan - Donja Dragotinja	R-475
R-I-1104	Lamovita - Omarska - Bronzani Majdan	R-405a
R-I-1105	Vrbaška - Gornji Podgradci - Vodice - Kozarac	R-477
R-I-2101	Čatrnja - Berek - Nova Topola	R-477
R-I-2102	Srbac - Prnjavor - Stanari Power Plant - Stanari - Rudanka	R-474; R-474a
R-I-2103	Čelinac - Brezičani - Dubrava Stara - Prnjavor	R-476
R-I-2104	Dubrava Stara - Pribinić	R-476a
R-I-2105	Srpske Toplice - Kola - Stričići - Čađavica	R-411
R-I-2106	Kola - Stričići	R-411a
R-I-2107	Karanovac - Mitrovići	R-414
R-I-2108	Mrkonjić Grad - Dabrac	R-412
R-I-2109	Jezero - Šipovo - Mrđanovci (border with FBiH: R-415)	R-415
R-I-2110	Donji Baraći - Šipovo	R-415a
R-I-3101	Crkvina - Donje Ledenice (border with FBiH: R-462)	R-462
R-I-3102	Prud (border with FBiH: M-14.2) - Šamac a break in the itinerary of this route Grebnice - border with FBiH (M-14.2)	R-464
R-I-3103	Modriča - Bušletić - Doboj - Rječica Donja/Parnica (border with FBiH: R-465)	R-465
R-I-3104	Polje - Podnovlje	R-472
R-I-3105	Stanari Power Plant - Teslić - Blatnica (RS) - Blatnica (FBiH) (border with FBiH: R-473)	R-473
R-I-3106	Stanari Power Plant - Radnja Donja - Lončari (border with FBiH: R-474)	R-474
R-I-4101	Caparde - Borogovo - Šekovići - Tišća	R-455
R-I-4102	Šibošnica (border with FBiH: R-456/R-459) - Piperi - Mačkovac - Lopare - Labucka - Priboj a break in the itinerary of this route Priboj - border with FBiH (R-456) a break in the itinerary of this route Sapna (border with FBiH: R-456) - Karakaj	R-456
R-I-4103	Čelić (border with FBiH: R-458) - Mačkovac a break in the itinerary of this route Lopare - Konjikovići/Površnice (border with FBiH: R-458)	R-458
R-I-4104	Sremska Rača - Crnjelovo Gornje - Vršani a break in the itinerary of this route Brezovo Polje (border with Brčko District: R-459a) - Bukovica Donja - Bobetino Brdo - Mrtvica	R-459a
R-I-4105	Mihaljevići (border with Serbia: 28) - Bratunac - Srebrenica - Zeleni Jadar	R-453
R-I-4106	Drinjača - Bratunac a break in the itinerary of this route Bratunac - Skelani	R-454a; R-454a
R-I-5101	Kula - Lukavica - Jasik - Vlahovići - Pale	R-446
R-I-5102	Mesići - Jabuka (branch to FBiH: R-448) - Živojevići (border with FBiH: R-448) a break in the itinerary of this route Podkozara Donja (border with FBiH: R-448) - Miljeno - Čajniče - Metaljka (border with Montenegro: R-3)	R-448
R-I-5103	Rogatica - Borike - Brankovići - Višegrad	R-450
R-I-5104	Žeravice (border with FBiH: R-467) - Han Pijesak - Borike - Brankovići - Pešurići - Međeđa	R-467
R-I-6101	Do (border with FBiH: R-427) - Predolje - Berkovići - Krivača	R-427
R-I-6102	Zijemlje (border with FBiH: R-435a) - Pridvorci - Nevesinje - Berkovići - Predolje - Vlahovići	R-435
R-I-6103	Ljubinje - Vlahovići - Podosoje a break in the itinerary of this route Bileća - Deleuša (border to Montenegro: M-9)	R-431; R-432; R-433
R-I-6104	Trebinje/Aleksina Međa - Podštirovnik (border to Montenegro: M-12)	R-429

=== Second-class Regional Roads ===
Road	Direction	Former Designation
R-II-1501	Novi Grad - Karan	R-475a
R-II-1502	Prijedor - Stara Rijeka (border with FBiH: R-406)	R-406
R-II-1503	Prijedor- Stratinska	
R-II-1504	Donja Kozica (border with FBiH) - Stričići	
R-II-1505	Kozarska Dubica - Gornjoselci - Vodice	R-477a
R-II-1506	Vrbaška - Trnovac - Potkozarje	R-478
R-II-1507	Rudice - Donji Dubovik	
R-II-1508	Međuvođe - Mlječanica - Gornji Jelovac	
R-II-1509	Prijedor/Orlovača - Omarska	
R-II-2501	Banja Luka - Slatina - Veliko Blaško - Klašnice	
R-II-2502	Drinić (border with FBiH) - Potoci - Zableće	
R-II-2503	Muselinovac (border with FBiH) - Potoci	
R-II-2504	Obodnik - Gluha Bukovica (border with FBiH: R-440)	R-440
R-II-2505	Razboj Ljevčanski - Laktaši	
R-II-2506	Trnovac - Dušanovo	
R-II-2507	Potočani - Brezičani	
R-II-3501	Bušletić - Sjenina Rijeka (FBiH: R-465b) - Zelinja Gornja/Zelinja Srednja (border with FBiH: R-456a)	R-465a
R-II-3502	Vrhovi - Modran - Johovac	R-482
R-II-3503	Doboj - Petrovo - Orahovica Donja (border with FBiH: R-461a)	
R-II-3504	Bok (border with FBiH: R-463) - Obudovac - Gornja Tramošnica (border with FBiH: R-463)	R-463
R-II-3505	Modran - Cerani - Osinja - Stanari	
R-II-4501	Milići - Zeleni Jadar - Skelani (border with Serbia: 171)	R-452
R-II-4502	Kaštijelj (border with FBiH: R-455a)	R-455a
R-II-4503	Piperi - Lukavica (border with FBiH: R-459) a break in the itinerary of this route Čelić (border with FBiH: R-459a) - Mrtvica - Koraj - Čađavica Gornja - Ugljevička Obrijež - Stari Ugljevik (FBiH: R-456a) - Donja Trnova - Glavičice a break in the itinerary of this route Donji Šepak - border with Serbia (27)	M-14.1; R-459
R-II-4504	Dubravice Gornje (border with Brčko District: R-458) - Pukiš/Čelić (border with FBiH: R-458)	R-458
R-II-4505	Labucka - Tobut	
R-II-4506	Šarci - Osmaci - Borogovo	
R-II-4507	Ljeljenča - Čađavica Gornja	
R-II-4508	Ferry to Serbia (Jamena, 121) - Crnjelovo Gornje - Velika Obarska - Bijeljina	
R-II-4509	Suvo Polje - Donja Trnova	
R-II-4510	Suvo Polje - Modran - Janja	
R-II-4511	Dragaljevac - Dragaljevac Srednji - Čađavica Gornja	
R-II-4512	Čađavica Donja - Velika Obarska	
R-II-5501	Dobro Polje - Jažići - Graiseljići - Plužine	R-433
R-II-5502	Jažići - Jelašca - Vrba	R-434
R-II-5503	Jelašca - Miljevina	R-434a
R-II-5504	Hotovlje (border with FBiH: R-436) - Graiseljići	R-436
R-II-5505	Krupac - border with FBiH (R-442a)	R-442a
R-II-5506	Turovi (border with FBiH: R-442b) - Trnovo	R-442b
R-II-5507	Vlahovići - Podgrab	R-446a
R-II-5508	Hreša (border with FBiH: R-447/R-958) - Sumbulovac	R-447
R-II-5509	Dobrun - Uvac - Mioče - Ustibar (Branch to Serbia/Sjeverin: 193) - border with Serbia (192)	R-449
R-II-5510	Uvac - border with Serbia (191)	R-449a
R-II-5511	Brod na Drini - Zubovići - Foča a break in the itinerary of this route Dragočava - Šula (border with Montenegro: R-3)	R-457
R-II-5512	Kolakovići (border with FBiH: R-468) - Sokolac	R-468
R-II-5513	Ustiprača - Miljeno - Godijeno	
R-II-5514	Višegrad - Kapetanovići - (border with Serbia)	R-451
R-II-5515	Lukavica - Vraca (border with FBiH: R-446) a break in the itinerary of this route Miljevići (border with FBiH: R-446) - Trebević (border with FBiH: R-446) a break in the itinerary of this route Dovlići (border with FBiH: R-446) - Dovlići - Jasik	R-446
R-II-5516	Mioče - Mokronozi - border with Serbia/Priboj	
R-II-5517	Uvac - Mokronozi	
R-II-6501	Avtovac - Vratkovići (border with Montenegro: R-7)	R-432
R-II-6502	Ćesim (border with FBiH: R-435) - Pridvorci	R-435
R-II-6503	Avtovac - Lipnik - border with Montenegro	R-432a

== See also ==
- Roads in Bosnia and Herzegovina
- List of E-roads in Bosnia and Herzegovina
