= European route E761 =

Road in trans-European E-road network

E761

Route information
- Length: 742 km (461 mi)

Major junctions
- From: Bihać
- Jajce, Donji Vakuf, Zenica, Sarajevo, Užice, Čačak, Kraljevo, Kruševac , Pojate, Paraćin
- To: Zaječar

Location
- Countries: Bosnia and Herzegovina, Serbia

Highway system
- International E-road network; A Class; B Class

European route E 761 is a road part of the International E-road network. It begins in Bihać, Bosnia and Herzegovina and ends in Zaječar, Serbia.

== Route ==
- Bosnia and Herzegovina
  - Federation of Bosnia and Herzegovina
    - M-5 : Bihać ( E71 ) - Ripač - Bosanski Petrovac - Ključ - Velečevo
  - Republika Srpska:
    - M-I-112 : Velečevo - Mrkonjić Grad - Jezero
  - Federation of Bosnia and Herzegovina
    - M-5 : Jezero - Jajce ( E661 ) - Donji Vakuf ( E661 ) - Travnik - Lašva ( E73 )
    - M-17 ( E73 ): Lašva - Bilješevo
    - A-1 : Bilješevo - Sarajevo ( E762 )
    - M-5 : Sarajevo ( E762 ) - Lapišnica
  - Republika Srpska:
    - M-I-114 : Lapišnica - Ljubogošta/Pale - Podromanija/Sokolac - Ustiprača - Višegrad - Donje Vardište
- Serbia
  - 28: Kotroman - Kremna - Užice ( E763 )
  - 23: Užice ( E763 ) - Požega - Jelen Do - Čačak ( E763 )
  - A5: Čačak ( E763 ) - Kraljevo
  - 22: Kraljevo (will be replaced with A-5)
  - 24: Kraljevo (will be replaced with A-5)
  - A5: Kraljevo - Kruševac - Pojate ( E75 )
  - A1 ( E75 ): Pojate - Paraćin
  - 36: Paraćin ( E75 ) - Boljevac - Zaječar ( E771 )
