= Bosnia and Herzegovina–Serbia border =

The border between Bosnia-Herzegovina and Serbia starts in the North at the tripoint with Croatia near Jamena and continues southward along the Drina river to the tripoint with Kosovo until it reaches the confluence with the Brusnički potok. The border is 302 km (188 mi) long. It then continues along that river and then winds roughly in southerly direction until it reaches the tripoint with Montenegro near Kukurovići. Along the final section there are two (pene-)enclaves: The pene-enclave near the town of Strmac, which is only connected to Serbian territory by a 30 meter wide strip and the Bosnian enclave of Međurečje, which is completely surrounded by Serbian territory and is currently administered by Serbian authorities.

== Border crossings ==
There are currently 19 functioning border crossings between the two countries, of which two are ferry crossings and four are railway crossings. The following is a table of the crossing points, listed from North to South:

(Bosnia and Herzegovina) Bosnian checkpoint	Municipality	(Serbia) Serbian checkpoint	District	Route in Bosnia-Herzegovina	Route in Serbia	Status
Crnjelovo Donje	Bijeljina	Jamena	Srem	car ferry	car ferry	local
Bosanska Rača	Bijeljina	Sremska Rača	Srem	M-18		international
Bijeljina	Bijeljina	Sremska Rača	Srem	railway	railway	international
Popovi	Bijeljina	Badovinci	Mačva	R-459b		international
Janja	Bijeljina	Lešnica	Mačva	ferry	ferry	local
Šepak	Zvornik	Trbušnica	Mačva	M-14.1	adjacent to	international
Zvornik	Zvornik	Brasina	Mačva	railway	railway	international
Karakaj	Zvornik	Mali Zvornik Novi most	Mačva	M-4	adjacent to	international
Zvornik	Zvornik	Mali Zvornik Stari most	Mačva	M-4	adjacent to	only citizens of BIH/SRB
Bratunac	Bratunac	Ljubovija	Mačva	adjacent to R-453	adjacent to	only citizens of BIH/SRB
Bratunac Novi most	Bratunac	Ljubovija Novi most	Mačva	adjacent to R-454	adjacent to	international
Skelani	Srebrenica	Bajina Bašta	Zlatibor	R-452	adjacent to M-172	international
Donje Vardište	Višegrad	Mokra Gora	Zlatibor	seasonal railway	seasonal railway	international
Donje Vardište	Višegrad	Kotroman	Zlatibor	M-5		international
Štrpci	Rudo	Priboj	Zlatibor	railway	railway	international
Carevo Polje	Rudo	Rača	Zlatibor	adjacent to R-449	local road	local
Uvac	Rudo	Rača	Zlatibor	adjacent to R-449	local road	international
Mokronozi	Rudo	Priboj	Zlatibor	local road	local road	local
Ustibar	Rudo	Vagan	Zlatibor	R-449	local road	international
