= M-4 highway (Montenegro) =

Highway in Montenegro

M-4 highway
- Magistralni put M-4

Route information
- Part of E-762
- Length: 22.3 km (13.9 mi)
- Existed: 1965–present

Major junctions
- West end: M-2 / E-65 / E-80 in Podgorica)

- East end: SH1 / E762 in Božaj (border with Albania)

Location
- Country: Montenegro
- Municipalities: Podgorica

Highway system
- Transport in Montenegro; Motorways
← M-3	→ M-5

M-4 highway (Montenegrin: Magistralni put M-4) (formerly part of M-18 highway east of Podgorica) is a Montenegrin roadway. It runs concurrently with European route E762.

== History ==
Construction on the M-18 highway finished in 1965. However, asphalt was not applied along the highway until years later.

In January 2016, the Ministry of Transport and Maritime Affairs published bylaw on categorisation of state roads. With new categorisation, M-18 highway was split in two new highways, M-3 highway and M-4 highway.

== Major intersections ==
Municipality	Location	km	mi	Destinations	Notes
Podgorica	Podgorica	0.0	0.0	M-2 / E-65 / E-80 / E-762 – Nikšić, Petrovac na Moru, Bar, Bijelo Polje	Western end of E 762 concurrency
Podgorica	Tuzi	8.3	5.2	No major intersection	
Podgorica	Božaj	22.3	13.9	SH1 / E762	Border crossing with Albania; Eastern end of E 762 concurrency
1.000 mi = 1.609 km; 1.000 km = 0.621 mi: Concurrency terminus
