= Brezicani =

Brezičani may refer to:

- Brezičani, Čelinac
- Brezičani, Donji Vakuf
