= Čatrnja =

Čatrnja may refer to:

- Čatrnja, Bosnia and Herzegovina, a village near Gradiška
- Čatrnja, Croatia, a village near Rakovica
