= European route E762 =

Road in trans-European E-road network

E762

Route information
- Length: 382 km (237 mi)

Major junctions
- North end: Sarajevo
- Nikšić; Podgorica
- South end: Božaj

Location
- Countries: Bosnia and Herzegovina; Montenegro

Highway system
- International E-road network; A Class; B Class

European route E 762 is a road part of the International E-road network. It begins in Sarajevo, Bosnia and Herzegovina, and officially ends at the border between Montenegro and Albania. In Albania, some road signs indicate the route heading towards Tirana.

== Route ==
- Bosnia and Herzegovina
  - Federation of Bosnia and Herzegovina
    - M-18 : Sarajevo - Dobrinja
  - Republika Srpska
    - M-I-111 : Lukavica - Krupac - Bogatići
  - Federation of Bosnia and Herzegovina
    - M-18 : Bogatići - Trnovo
  - Republika Srpska
    - M-I-111 : Trnovo - Brod na Drini/Foča - Šćepan Polje
- Montenegro
  - M-3: Šćepan Polje - Podgorica ( E65 / E80)
  - M-2: Podgorica
  - M-4: Podgorica ( E65 / E80) - Božaj
