= Međeđa (Višegrad) =

- Village
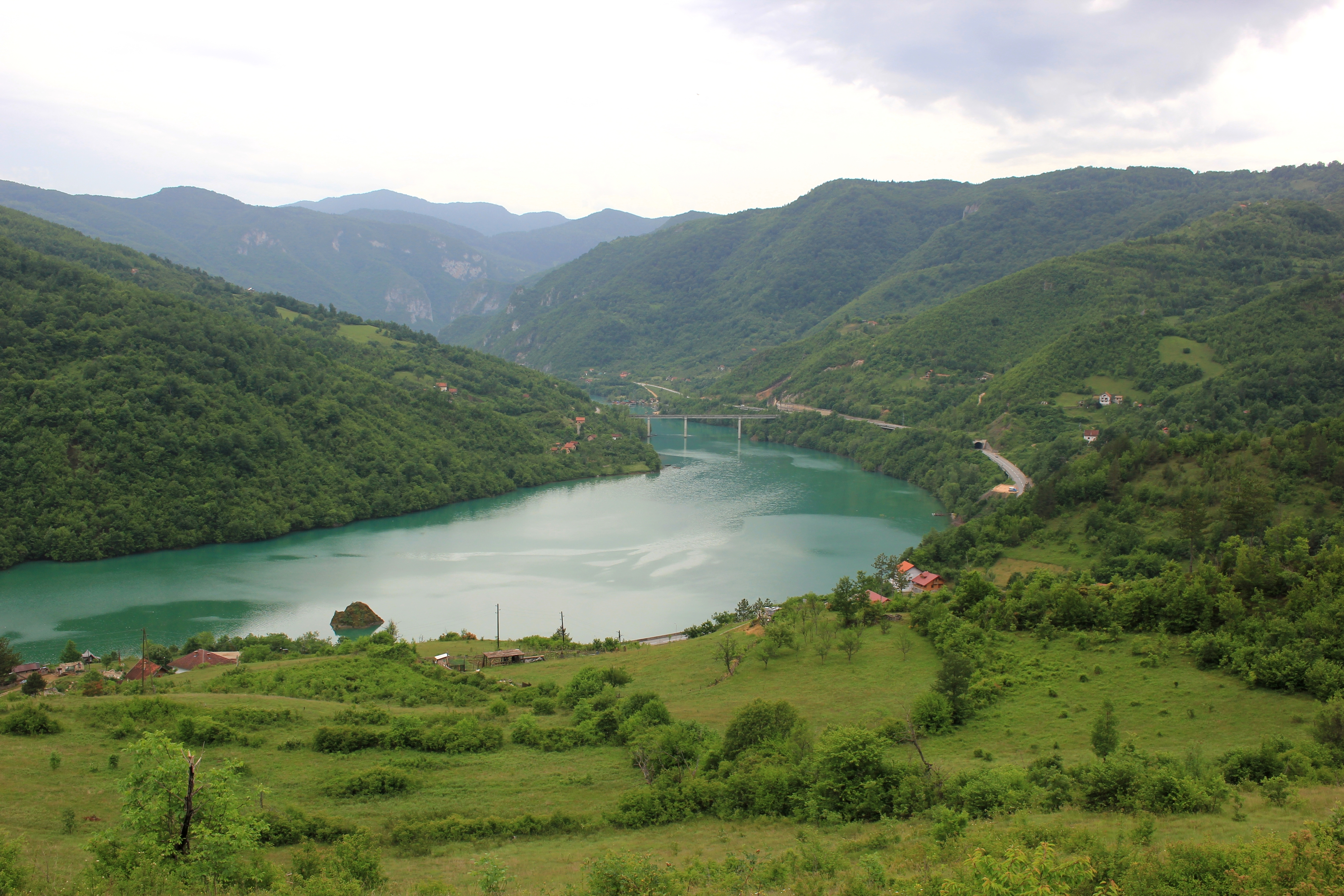
- View on Međeđa and the Drina

- Location within Bosnia and Herzegovina
- Coordinates: 43°44′1″N 19°10′52″E
- Country: Bosnia and Herzegovina
- Entity: Republika Srpska
- Municipality: Višegrad
- Time zone: UTC+1 (CET)
  - Summer (DST): UTC+2 (CEST)

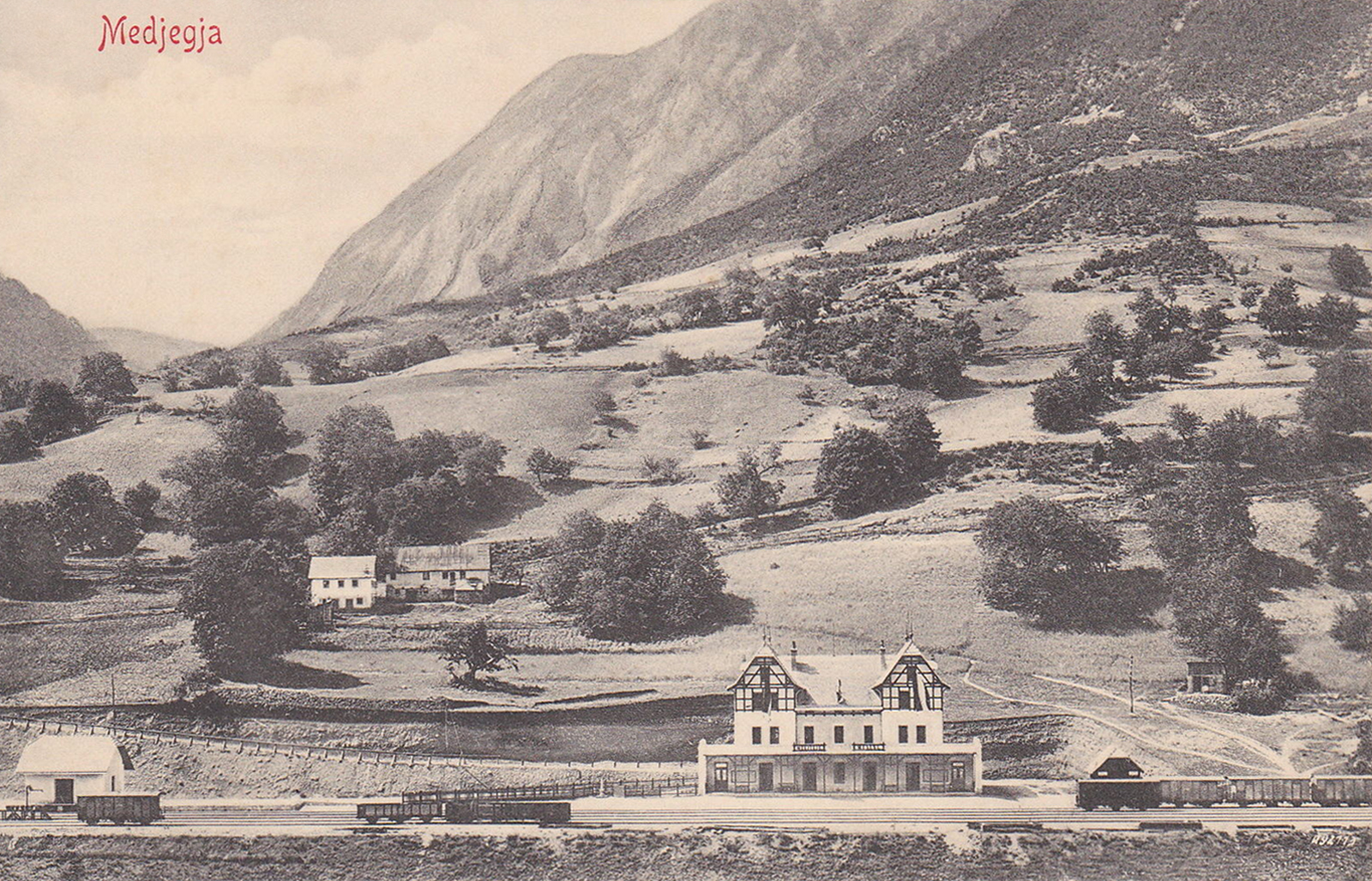
Međeđa train station after opening in 1906

Međeđa (Serbian: Међеђа) is a village in the municipality of Višegrad, Bosnia and Herzegovina. Međeđa is located in the Međeđa gorge, which is for the most part flooded by the water reservoir, created for the Višegrad hydroelectric power plant.

The Bosnian Eastern Railway from Sarajevo to Uvac and Vardište was built through Međeđa during the Austro-Hungarian rule in Bosnia and Herzegovina. Construction of the line started in 1903. It was completed in 1906, using the 760 mm (2 ft 5 15/16 in) track gauge. With the cost of 75 million gold crowns, which approximately translates to 450 thousand gold crowns per kilometer, it was one of the most expensive railways in the world built by that time. During the aggression against Bosnia and Herzegovina, the villages were destroyed by Serbian Forces “Chetniks”. Additional devastation occurred during the filming of the movie Lepa Sela Lepo Gore, when remaining structures, including the mosque in the Međeđa, were damaged. The railway station in Međeđa operated as a junction railway station to destinations of Sarajevo, Uvac and Vardište. The extensions were built from Uvac to Priboj, and from Vardište to Belgrade in 1928. The line was closed down in 1978 and dismantled afterwards. The site of the former railway station was flooded by the water reservoir in 1989.
