= Donji Baraći =

Former town and municipality of Bosnia and Herzegovina

Donji Baraći Доњи Бараћи
- Small Town
- Location within Bosnia and Herzegovina
- Coordinates: 44°19′15″N 16°56′12″E

Population (2013)
  - Total: 295

Donji Baraći (Serbian Cyrillic: Доњи Бараћи) is a settlement located in the Municipality of Mrkonjić Grad, of the Republika Srpska Entity in Bosnia and Herzegovina. It used to be a municipality in the Socialist Federal Republic of Yugoslavia until 1963, when it was abolished and incorporated into the Municipality of Mrkonjić Grad.

== Geography ==
The settlement is located 27 kilometers away from the municipal capital. Today, the town is located within the local community, Baraći. The settlement can also be referred to just as Baraći due to the split up of the town (North and South).

Until 1963. Baraći was a municipality, which was then abolished and annexed to the municipality of Mrkonjić Grad. The municipality of Baraći consisted of 12 settlements: Gerzovo, Gornja Pecka, Gornja Podgorja, Gornji Baraći, Donja Pecka, Donja Podgorja, Donji Baraći, Jasenovi Potoci, Medna, Mlinište, Trnovo, and Ubovića Brdo.

== Etymology ==
The Name Baraći can derive from the first Slavic settlers of this settlement; Jakov, Luka, Tode, Mitar and Grujo. Which settled the larger Bar field and through the word Bar, they were called "Baranima" and the settlement "Baraći". The nearby village Baraćuša can be derived from the same meaning.

== Settlement ==
The first Slavs of the area were Jakov, Luka, Tode, Mitar and Grujo. Their descendents bare the surnames (Jakovljevići, Lukići, Todići, Mitrovići and Grujići). This settlement was populated by the brothers which came from Berane, Montenegro.

== History ==
=== Illyrian Period ===
The area of this settlement was inhabited by ancient Celts and Illyrians. There are 2 archeologic sites in the area located in Gornja Pecka, Gerzova and Trnova. Velika Iradina was a populated area in Gornja Pecka from the pre historic period. The second site is Pjanita which is located in the settlement of Gerzova, a Celtic ax from the Bronze Age has been found.

=== Roman Period ===
In the beginning of 229 BC, The Romans and Illyrians were fighting heavily in the First Illyrian war which resulted in a Roman Victory. After the failed Illyrian rebellion, the region became a part of the Illyricum Province of Rome. During this time period, most of the population fled to the highlands.

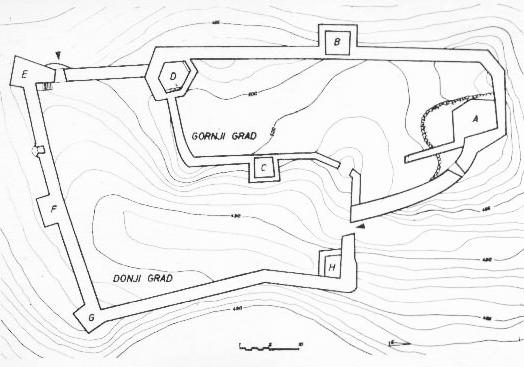
Map of the inner walls of the Sokograd city

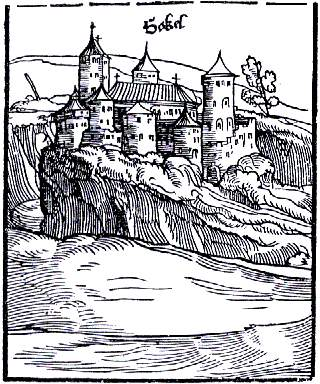
Illustration of the Sokograd City in the 16th century

=== Medieval Period ===
In old documents the town Sokol was mentioned as "Sokol na Plivi". The town was built in the end of the 13th century and was first mentioned in a 1363 document. In July 1363, a joint force of Croats and Hungarians launched an attack on Bosnia in an attempt to take over Pliva and Vrbaška. The Hungarian-Croat forces had to retreat after the 3rd day due to Hrvoje Vukčić Hrvatinić which defended the town. Sokol was the center of the Pliva county around this time period. During the period of the Kingdom of Bosnia, Baraći was part of the Zmijanja Territory which was controlled by Zmijanj Rajko. Zmijanj participated in the Battle of Kosovo (1389). After the death of Tvrtko, Hrvoje Vukčić Hrvatinić controlled the area.

=== Ottoman Period ===
In late May 1463, Mahmud Pasha launched an invasion of Bosnia with 20,000 Soldiers directly heading towards Jajce through Gerzovo, Sokoc, Pecka, Medina and Ključ. After the Turkish Conquest of Bosnia, The Nahija of Sokol or The Nahija of Gerzovo (Note: In Serbo Croatian, the Nahija was named Nahija Sokol or Nahija Gerzovo, In Cyrillic; (Serbian Cyrillic: Нахија Сокол, Нахија Герзово)) was a Nahiyah formed in 1528 that controlled territory from Pliva to the Sana river. During this time period the settlement Pecka and Vrbljani were first mentioned. In the Turkish defters, it is hard to identify the correlation between censuses in that period to now due to name changes. The settlement Gerzovo was named Prhovo (Прово) while the settlement Pecka was listed as Kozara (Козара). It can be confirmed that all of the settlements around Baraći were part of the Sokolac Nahija. During the Nahija of Gerzovo, Sokograd was the administrative center of the Nahija.

=== Yugoslavia ===
Baraći served as a municipality from the foundation of Communist Yugoslavia up until December 6, 1962, when Baraći lost its status as a Municipality. The territory was incorporated into the municipality of Mrkonjić Grad.

== Population ==
Ethnicity	2013	1991.	1981.	1971.	1961
Serbs	294 (99.7%)	519 (98.86%)	612 (96,68%)	730 (97,07%)	626
Croatians	1 (0,3%)	5 (0,95%)	6 (0,94%)	2 (0,26%)	1
Yugoslavs			7 (1,10%)	6 (0,79%)	1
Montenegrins			3	5	1
Albanians			4	5	1
Macedonians					5
Muslims (Bosniaks)				1 (0,13%)	
Other		1 (0,19%)	1	2	3
In Total:	295	525	633	752	639

== See also ==
- Sokograd
- Mrkonjić Grad
- Gornji Baraci

== Literature ==
Udovčić, Rade (2007). Baraći i Baraćani (in Serbian). Mrkonjić Grad: JU Kulturni Centar, Petar Kočić. ISBN 978-99938-888-0-2.
