= SH 1 (Albania) =

National highway in Albania

National Road SH1
- Rruga shtetërore SH1
- Map of the Rruga Shtetërore 1 (SH1) mainline denoted in blue in Albania

Route information
- Part of: E762; E851
- Maintained by the Autoriteti Rrugor Shqiptar
- Length: 125 km (78 mi)

Major junctions
- North end: Han i Hotit
- South end: Tirana

Location
- Country: Albania
- Counties: Durrës; Lezhë; Tirana; Shkodër
- Major cities: Fushë-Krujë; Koplik; Laç; Lezhë; Shkodër; Tirana

Highway system
- Highways in Albania

The national road SH1 (Albanian: Rruga Shtetërore 1) is a national highway in Albania. It has a length of 125 kilometres (78 mi) across the counties of Durrës, Lezhë, Shkodër and Tirana.

As part of the European routes E762 and E851, the highway constitute portion of a larger corridor connecting Montenegro in the northwest with Tirana in the southwest thus forming as well as part of the Adriatic-Ionian motorway.

In recent years, the road has been undergoing major reconstruction works in several parts.

== Route ==
Tha National Road SH1 leads to the Albanian-Montenegrin border at Hani i Hotit border crossing. From Tirana at the Kamza Bypass (Albanian: Mbikalimi i Kamzës) northward, it passes through Fushë-Krujë, Milot, Lezhë, Shkodër, and Koplik. Between Thumane and Milot, the SH1 became part of A1 Motorway.

== Background ==
The road segment between Han i Hotit and Shkodër (about 32.5 km (20.2 mi)) was completed in 2013 as a single carriageway standard (Albanian: superstradë). The Shkodër Bypass started after the 2010 floods. It was planned to incorporate a defensive dam against Lake Shkodër, but works were abandoned a few years later only to restart in 2017. The road continues as a single carriageway down to Milot and contains some uncontrolled and dangerous entry and exit points.

It is planned that sections between Milot and Lezhë will be widened to dual carriageway standard in the near future.

When it was designed in early 2000s, the entire road between Tirana and Shkodër was intended to be a dual carriageway. However, the lack of funding at the time only allowed for one carriageway to be constructed, thus the lack of shoulders. The section between Milot and Fushë-Krujë was unofficially named as the "Road of Death" by many media reports for its structural deficiencies. As of 2009, the 25 kilometres (16 mi) dangerous long section is being upgraded to motorway standard and has become part of the A1 motorway connecting the capital Tirana with Kosovo.

== See also ==
- Transport in Albania
- A1 (Albania)
- Adriatic Ionian motorway
