= Istočni Drvar =

Municipality in Bosnia and Herzegovina

Istočni Drvar Источни Дрвар
- Municipality
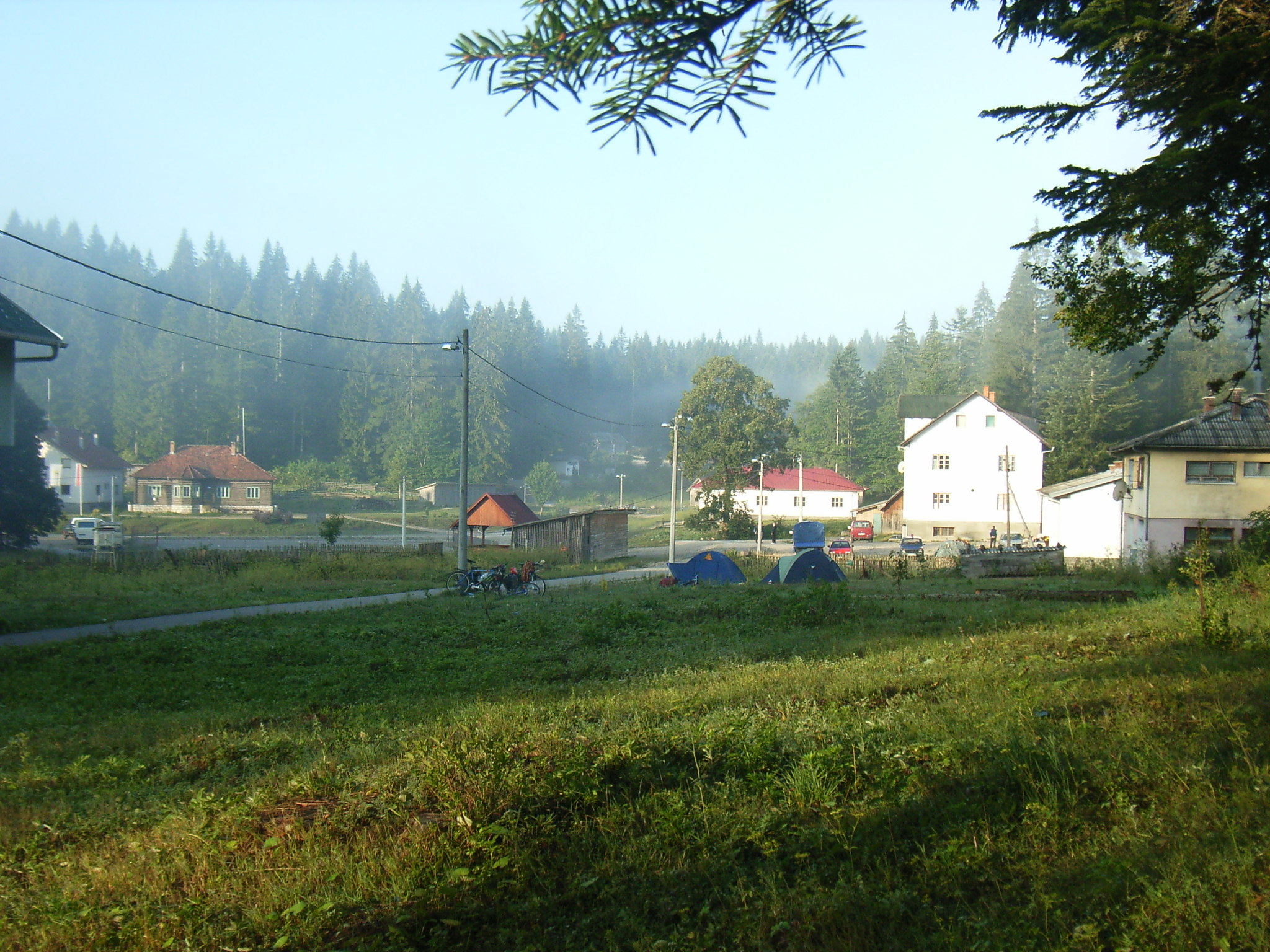
- Istočni Drvar

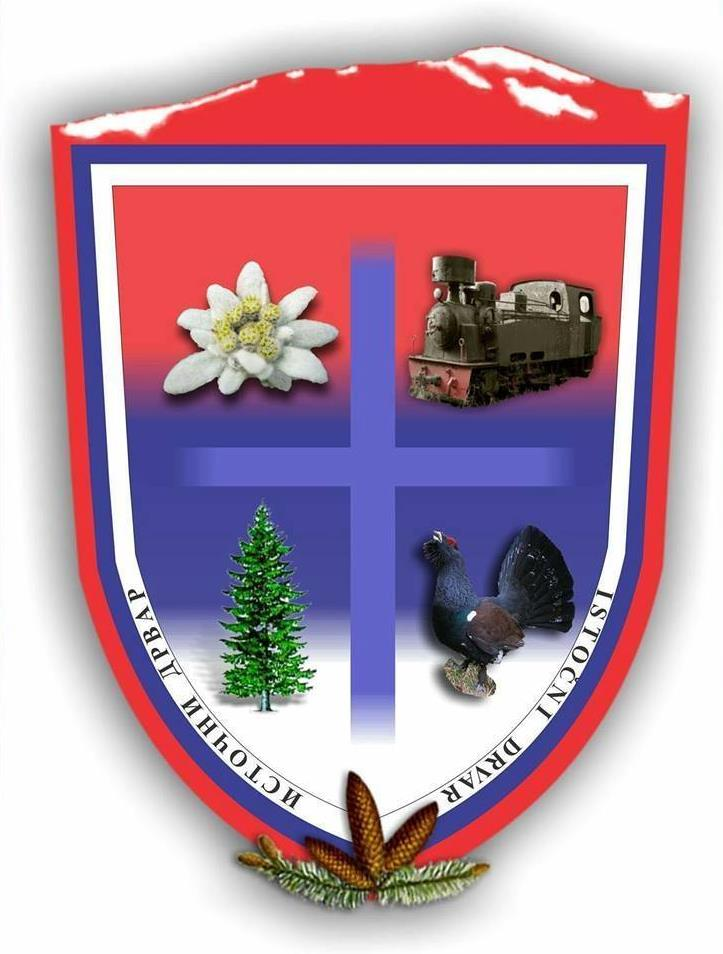
- Coat of arms

- Location of Istočni Drvar within Bosnia and Herzegovina

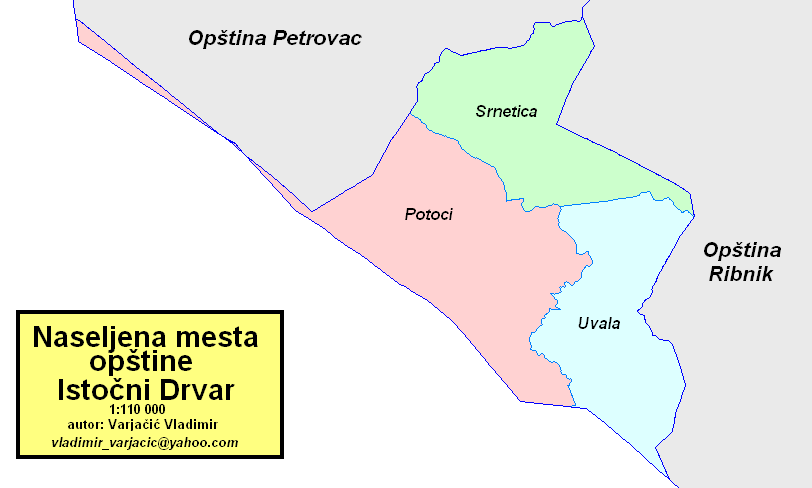
- Coordinates: 44°23′22″N 16°37′25″E
- Country: Bosnia and Herzegovina
- Entity: Republika Srpska
- Geographical region: Bosanska Krajina

Government
  - Municipal mayor: Milka Ivanković (SNSD)

Area
  - Total: 75.3 km^{2} (29.1 sq mi)

Population (2022)
  - Total: 105
  - Density: 1.39/km^{2} (3.61/sq mi)
- Time zone: UTC+1 (CET)
  - Summer (DST): UTC+2 (CEST)
- Area code: 51

Istočni Drvar (Serbian Cyrillic: Источни Дрвар) is a municipality located in Republika Srpska, Bosnia and Herzegovina. it is situated in the central part of the Bosanska Krajina region. The seat of the municipality is in the village of Potoci.

== History ==
In 1995, following the end of the Bosnian War, Istočni Drvar was created from part of the pre-war municipality of Drvar (the other part of the pre-war municipality is now in the Federation of Bosnia and Herzegovina). During the war, it was also known as Srpski Drvar (Српски Дрвар).

As of 2019, it is the smallest municipality by number of inhabitants in Republika Srpska and the whole of Bosnia and Herzegovina.

== Geography ==
It is located in a densely wooded area between municipalities of Petrovac in the north-west, Ribnik in the east, and Drvar in the south.

== Demographics ==
=== Population ===
Population of settlements – Istočni Drvar municipality
	Settlement	1991.	2013.
	Total		79
1	Potoci	61	66

=== Ethnic composition ===
Ethnic composition – Istočni Drvar municipality (2013)
Total	79 (100.0%)
Serbs	78 (98.73%)
Croats	1 (1.266%)

== See also ==
- Municipalities of Republika Srpska
