= Vladislav Topalović =

Archpriest-stavrophor (born 1975)

- Native name: Владислав Топаловић
- Church: Serbian Orthodox Church

Personal details
- Born: 8 January 1975 (age 50) Prijepolje
- Children: 3

Vladislav Topalović (Serbian Cyrillic: Владислав Топаловић; born 8 January 1975) is an archpriest-stavrophor in the Serbian Orthodox Church and the dean of the Saint Vasilije Ostroški Orthodox Theological Faculty, University of East Sarajevo in Foča. He serves in the Church of the Holy Archangels Michael and Gabriel, Sarajevo.

== Biography ==
Vladislav was born in Prijepolje to Vojislav and Marta Topalović.He attended primary school in Rudo, he then attended the Saint Sava Orthodox School of Theology, and he graduated from the Saint Vasilije Ostroški Orthodox Theological Faculty, where he would later become a dean in 2017.After getting his diploma, he attended postgraduate studies at the University of Greifswald, Faculty of Theology.

He is a professor of the Old Testament and the author of publications that focus on the manuscript traditions of Judaism and Christianity, Judeo-Christian dialogue and the history of Christian theological Anti-Judaism.He has written multiple books, with his newest one being "И ево ја сам са вама: Увод и тумачење Jеванђеља по Mатеју", published in 2022, which focuses on the Gospel of Matthew.
