= Caparde, Osmaci =

Caparde Цапарде
- Village
- Location within Republika Srpska Location within Bosnia and Herzegovina
- Coordinates: 44°23′45″N 18°58′03″E
- Country: Bosnia and Herzegovina
- Entity: Republika Srpska
- Municipality: Osmaci
- Time zone: UTC+1 (CET)
  - Summer (DST): UTC+2 (CEST)

Caparde (Cyrillic: Цапарде) is a village in the municipality of Osmaci, Republika Srpska, Bosnia and Herzegovina.

== History ==
Until the war in Bosnia and Herzegovina (1992-1995), the settlement of Caparde was part of the municipality of Kalesija.
