= Crkvina (Šamac) =

Crkvina Црквина (Serbian)
- Village (Selo)
- Location within Bosnia and Herzegovina
- Coordinates: 45°1′40″N 18°26′11″E
- Country: Bosnia and Herzegovina
- Entity: Republika Srpska
- Municipality: Šamac
- Time zone: UTC+1 (CET)
  - Summer (DST): UTC+2 (CEST)

Crkvina (Serbian Cyrillic: Црквина) is a village in the municipality of Šamac, Bosnia and Herzegovina.
