= Rudice, Bosnia and Herzegovina =

Rudice
- Village
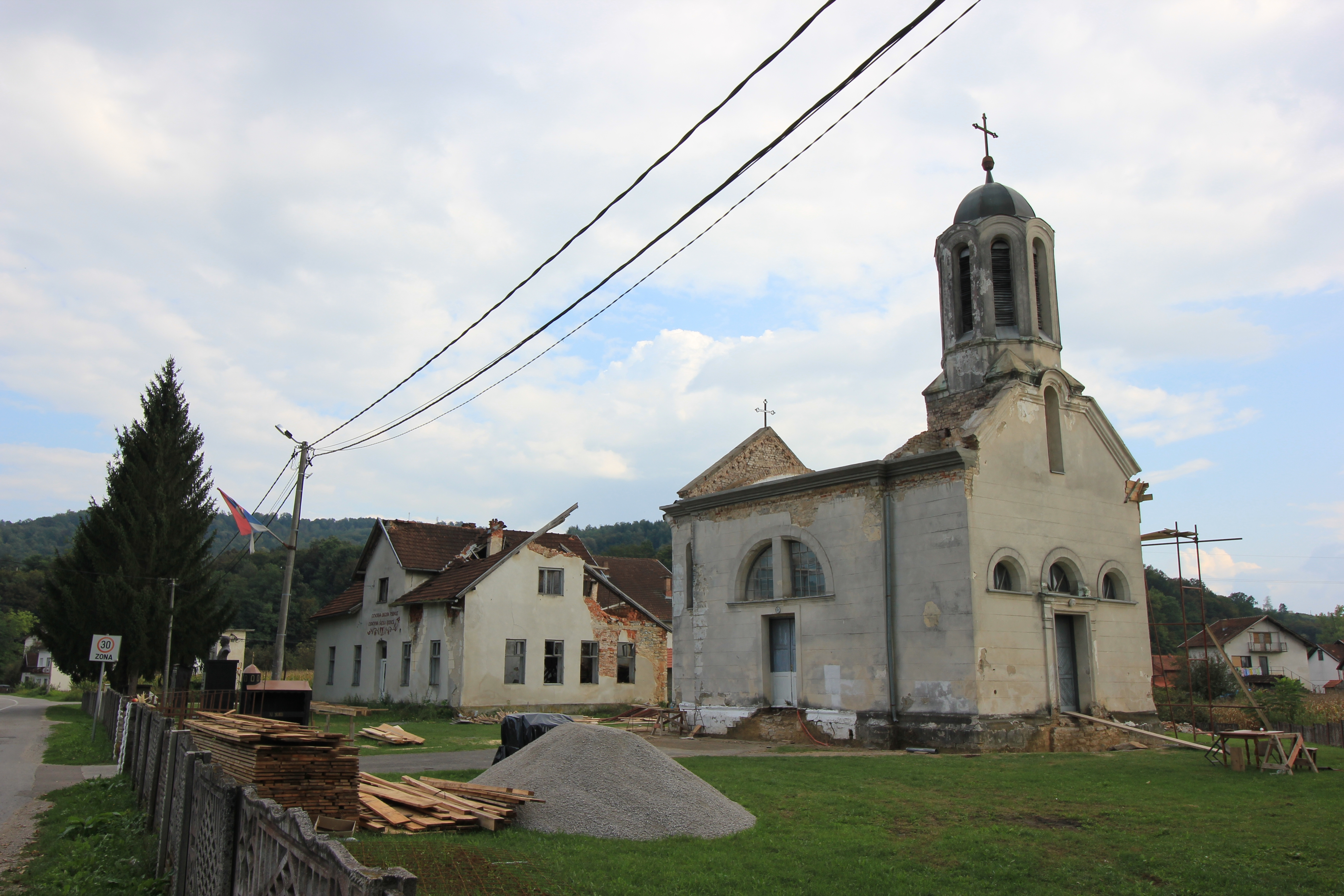
- Ruins of Rudice Church

- Location within Bosnia and Herzegovina
- Coordinates: 44°59′54″N 16°20′52″E
- Country: Bosnia and Herzegovina
- Entity: Republika Srpska
- Municipality: Novi Grad
- Time zone: UTC+1 (CET)
  - Summer (DST): UTC+2 (CEST)

Rudice (Serbian Cyrillic: Рудице) is a village in the municipality of Novi Grad, Republika Srpska, Bosnia and Herzegovina.
