= Bronzani Majdan =

Bronzani Majdan Бронзани Мајдан (Serbian)
- Village (Selo)
- Location within Bosnia and Herzegovina
- Coordinates: 44°47′13″N 16°55′52″E
- Country: Bosnia and Herzegovina
- Entity: Republika Srpska
- Municipality: Banja Luka

Population (2013)
  - Total: 614
- Time zone: UTC+1 (CET)
  - Summer (DST): UTC+2 (CEST)

Bronzani Majdan (Serbian Cyrillic: Бронзани Мајдан) is a village in the municipality of Banja Luka, Republika Srpska, Bosnia and Herzegovina.

== Demographics ==
Ethnic groups in the village includes:

- 570 Serbs (92.83%)
- 32 Bosniaks (5.21%)
- 12 Others (1.96%)
