= Vrba, Gacko =

Vrba Врба
- Village
- Location within Bosnia and Herzegovina
- Coordinates: 43°13′22″N 18°34′47″E
- Country: Bosnia and Herzegovina
- Entity: Republika Srpska
- Municipality: Gacko
- Time zone: UTC+1 (CET)
  - Summer (DST): UTC+2 (CEST)

Vrba (Serbian Cyrillic: Врба) is a village in the municipality of Gacko, Republika Srpska, Bosnia and Herzegovina.
