= M-18 road (Bosnia and Herzegovina) =

Road in Bosnia and Herzegovina

Magistral Road M18
- Magistralna cesta M18

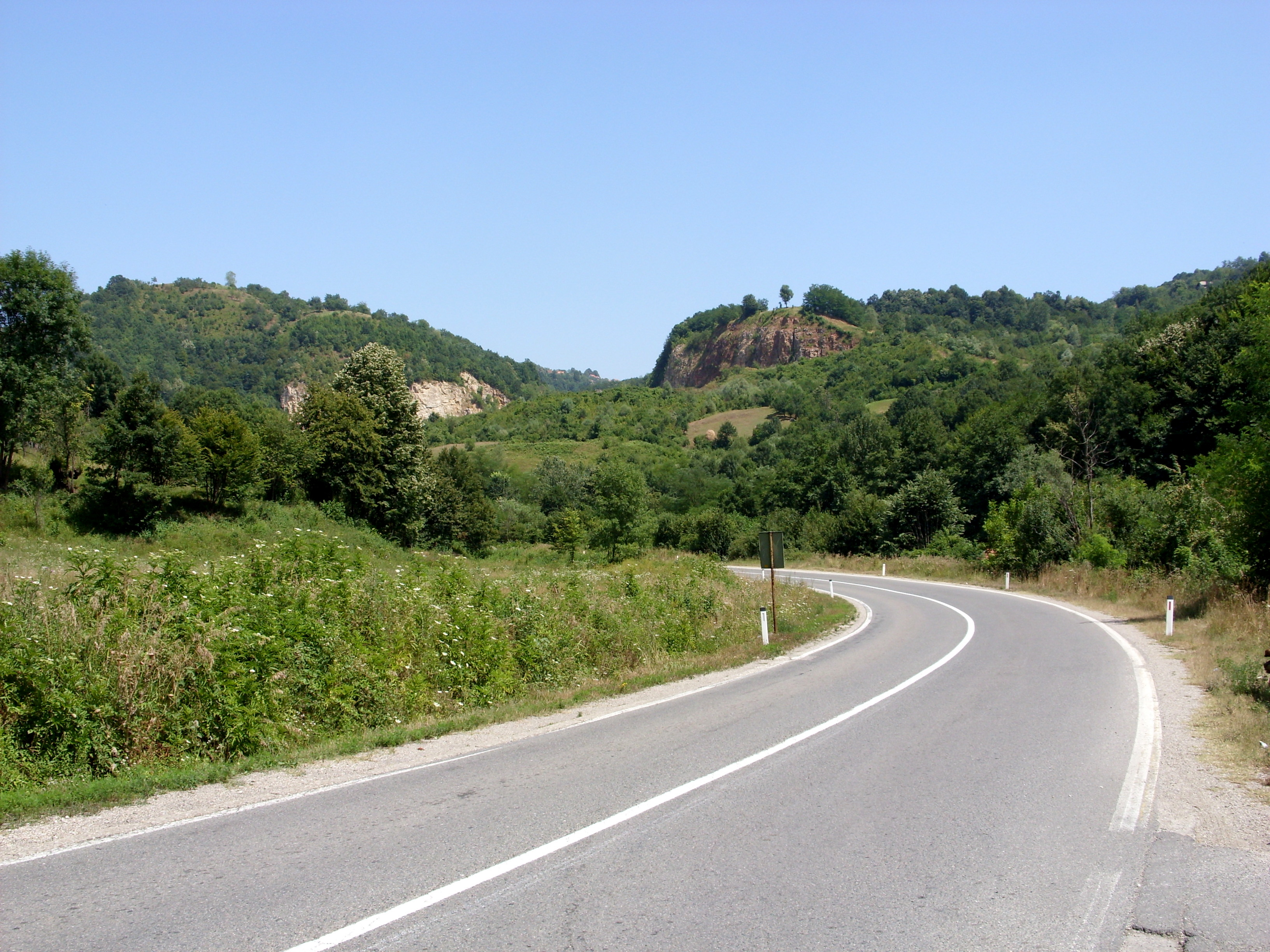
- M-18 between Ugljevik and Priboj

Route information
- Part of
- Length: 300 km (190 mi)

Major junctions
- From: 19 at Rača border crossing
- To: M-3 at Hum border crossing

Location
- Country: Bosnia and Herzegovina
- Major cities: Bijeljina; Ugljevik; Tuzla; Živinice; Kladanj; Olovo; Vogošća; Sarajevo; Trnovo; Foča

Highway system
- Transport in Bosnia and Herzegovina

The M-18 main road is a main road in Bosnia and Herzegovina. The road is a part of European route E762. It runs from Serbian border in Rača border crossing near Velino Selo towards Montenegrin border in Hum near Foča.
