= Lončari, Donji Žabar =

Lončari Лончари (Serbian)
- Village (Selo)
- Location within Bosnia and Herzegovina
- Country: Bosnia and Herzegovina
- Entity: Republika Srpska
- Municipality: Donji Žabar
- Time zone: UTC+1 (CET)
  - Summer (DST): UTC+2 (CEST)

Lončari (Cyrillic: Лончари) is a village in the municipality of Donji Žabar, Bosnia and Herzegovina. It is home to the football club FK Mladost Lončari.
