= Gornji Baraći =

Gornji Baraći Горњи Бараћи
- Village
- Location within Bosnia and Herzegovina
- Coordinates: 44.33046572439427°N 16.971602110861458°E
- Country: Bosnia & Herzegovina

Population
  - Total: 89

Gornji Baraći is a settlement in Bosnia and Herzegovina, located in the Municipality of Mrkonjic Grad of the Republika Srpska entity.

== Name ==
The Name Baraći can derive from the first Slavic settlers of this settlement; Jakov, Luka, Tode, Mitar and Grujo. Which settled the larger Bar field and through the word Bar, they were called "Baranima" and the settlement "Baraći". The nearby village Baraćuša can be derived from the same meaning.

== History ==
=== Origin ===
The first Slavs of the area were Jakov, Luka, Tode, Mitar and Grujo. Their descendents bare the surnames (Jakovljevići, Lukići, Todići, Mitrovići and Grujići). This settlement was populated by the brothers which came from Berane, Montenegro.

=== Yugoslavia ===
Baraći served as a municipality from the foundation of Communist Yugoslavia up until December 6, 1962, when Baraći lost its status as a Municipality. The territory was incorporated into the municipality of Mrkonjić Grad.

== Demographics ==
According to the 1991 census, the village had a total of 316 inhabitants. Ethnic groups in the village include:

- Serbs: 315 (99,7%)
- Croats: 1 (0,3%)

According to the 2013 census, the village had a total of 89 inhabitants. Ethnic groups in the village include:

- Serbs 89 (100%)
