= Međuvođe =

- Village
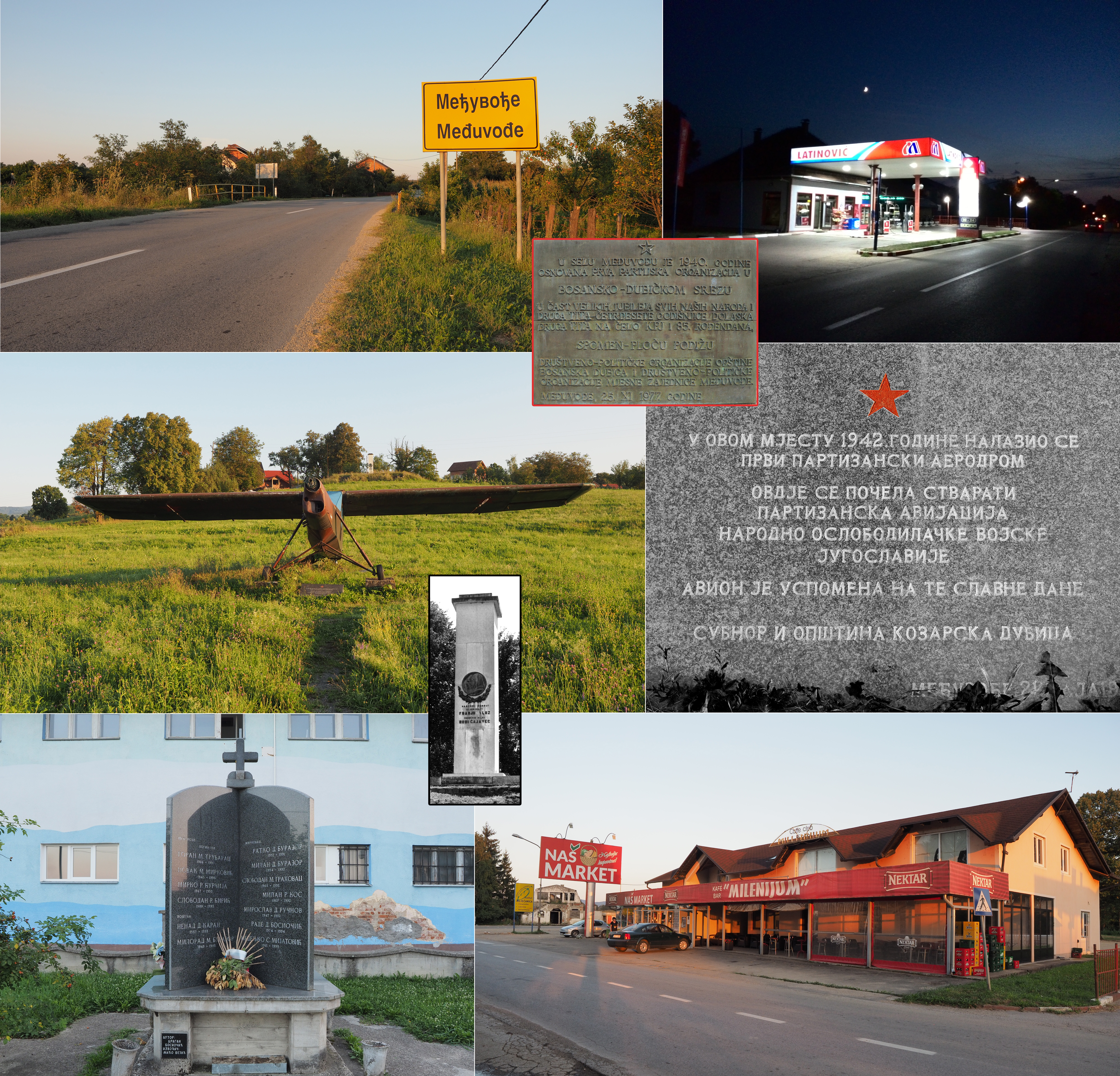

- Location within Bosnia and Herzegovina
- Coordinates: 45°08′N 16°44′E
- Country: Bosnia and Herzegovina
- Entity: Republika Srpska
- Municipality: Dubica
- Time zone: UTC+1 (CET)
  - Summer (DST): UTC+2 (CEST)

Međuvođe (Serbian Cyrillic: Међувође) is a village in the municipality of Dubica in Republika Srpska, Bosnia and Herzegovina.
