= Radnja Donja =

Radnja Donja Радња Доња
- Village
- Location within Bosnia and Herzegovina
- Coordinates: 44°42′08″N 17°50′50″E
- Country: Bosnia and Herzegovina
- Entity: Republika Srpska
- Municipality: Stanari
- Time zone: UTC+1 (CET)
  - Summer (DST): UTC+2 (CEST)

Radnja Donja (Cyrillic: Радња Доња) is a village in the municipality of Stanari, Bosnia and Herzegovina.
