= Suvo Polje =

Coordinates: 44°41′33″N 19°05′51″E

Suvo Polje СуBо Поље
Location	Bijeljina, Republika Srpska
Population – (est.) – (1991 census)	1,503
Area code	+387 55
Time zone	CET (UTC +1); CEST (UTC +2)
Website	https://www.gradbijeljina.org/

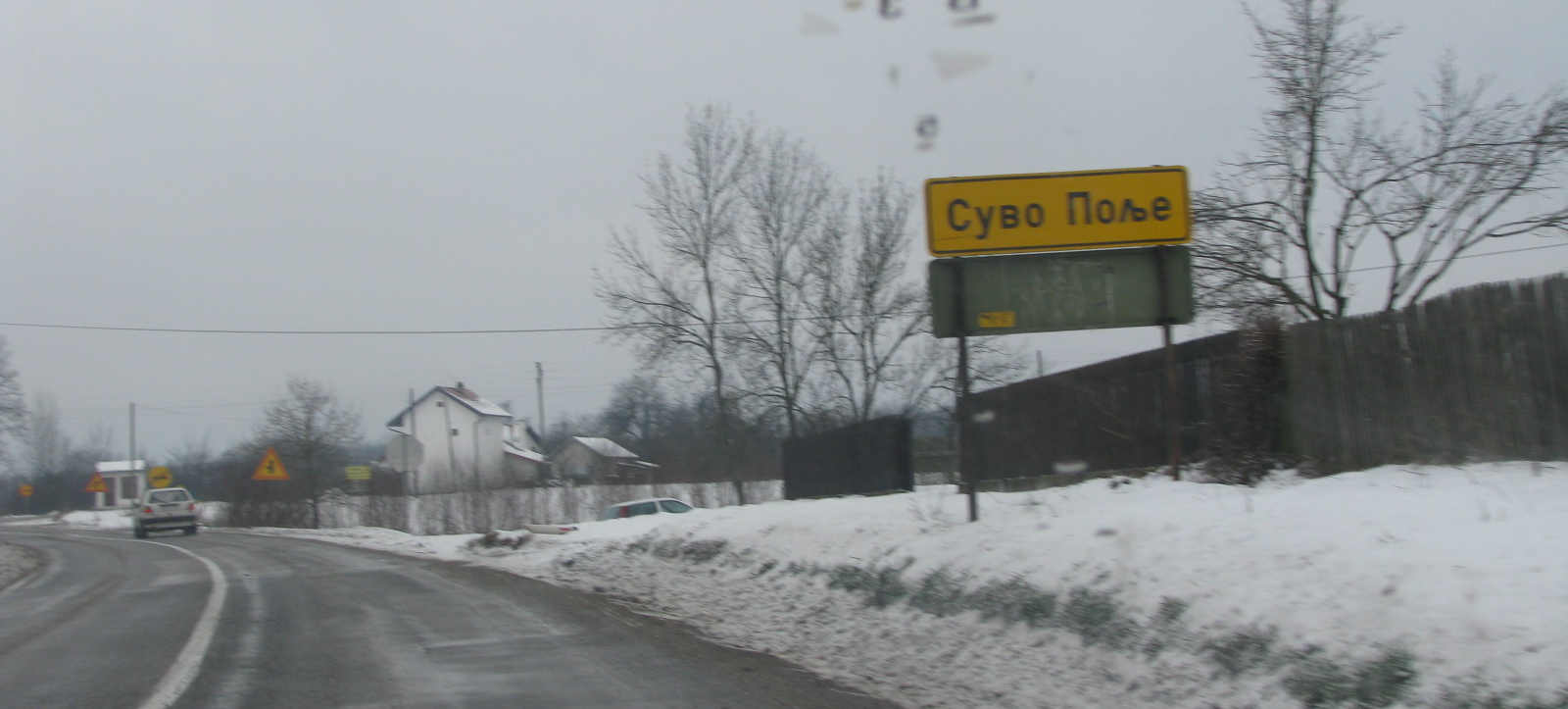
Road sign at the entrance to Suvo Polje

Suvo Polje (Cyrillic: СуBо Поље), also known as Suvo Polje ( Cyrillic: Суво Поље) is a settlement located south-west of the city Bijeljina in Republika Srpska, Bosnia and Herzegovina. To the east of Suho Polje is Modran and to the north is Zagoni.

== Demographics ==
The 1991 census showed Suho Polje had 1,503 inhabitants. 1,443 were Serbs, 2 were Croats, 40 considered themselves Yugoslavs, and there were 18 others.

== Sport ==
Suho Polje has a football club known as FK Jedisntvo.
