= Kola, Banja Luka =

Kola Кола (Serbian)
- Village (Selo)
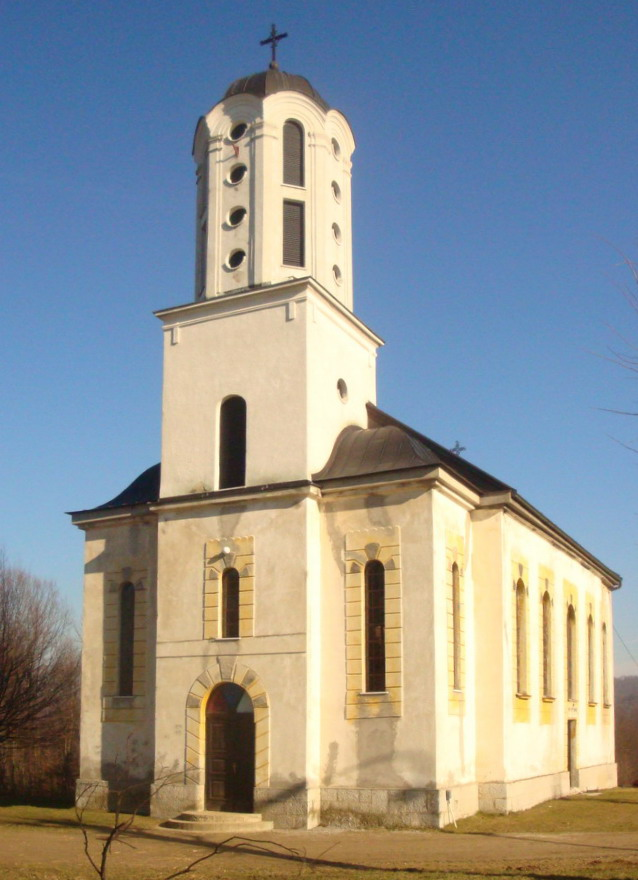
- Serbian Orthodox church in Kola

- Location within Bosnia and Herzegovina
- Coordinates: 44°42′58″N 17°05′07″E
- Country: Bosnia and Herzegovina
- Entity: Republika Srpska
- Municipality: Banja Luka

Population (2013)
  - Total: 1,385
- Time zone: UTC+1 (CET)
  - Summer (DST): UTC+2 (CEST)

Kola (Serbian Cyrillic: Кола) is a village in the municipality of Banja Luka, Republika Srpska, Bosnia and Herzegovina.
