= Donji Dubovik, Krupa na Uni =

Donji Dubovik Доњи Дубовик
- Village
- Location within Bosnia and Herzegovina
- Coordinates: 44°53′28″N 16°19′26″E
- Country: Bosnia and Herzegovina
- Entity: Republika Srpska
- Municipality: Krupa na Uni

Area
  - Total: 11.70 km^{2} (4.52 sq mi)

Population (2013)
  - Total: 217
- Time zone: UTC+1 (CET)
  - Summer (DST): UTC+2 (CEST)

Donji Dubovik (Serbian Cyrillic: Доњи Дубовик) is a village and the center of the municipality of Krupa na Uni, Bosnia and Herzegovina. According to the 2013 census, the village has a population of 215.

== Demographics ==
According to the 2013 census, its population was 217.

Ethnicity in 2013
Ethnicity	Number	Percentage
Serbs	215	99.1%
Croats	2	0.9%
Total	2,242	100%
