= Potoci, Istočni Drvar =

Potoci Потоци
- Village
- Location within Bosnia and Herzegovina
- Country: Bosnia and Herzegovina
- Entity: Republika Srpska; Federation of Bosnia and Herzegovina
- Municipality: Istočni Drvar

Area
  - Total: 14.87 sq mi (38.51 km^{2})

Population (2013)
  - Total: 41
  - Density: 2.8/sq mi (1.1/km^{2})
- Time zone: UTC+1 (CET)
  - Summer (DST): UTC+2 (CEST)

Potoci (Serbian Cyrillic: Потоци) is a village in the municipality of Drvar, Bosnia and Herzegovina.

== Demographics ==
According to the 2013 census, its population was 41 in the Republika Srpska part and nil in the Federation of Bosnia and Herzegovina part.

Ethnicity in 2013
Ethnicity	Number	Percentage
Serbs	40	97.6%
Croats	1	2.4%
Total	41	100%
