= Zableće =

Zableće Заблеће
- Village
- Location within Bosnia and Herzegovina
- Coordinates: 44°29′15″N 16°50′14″E
- Country: Bosnia and Herzegovina
- Entity: Republika Srpska
- Municipality: Ribnik
- Time zone: UTC+1 (CET)
  - Summer (DST): UTC+2 (CEST)

Zableće (Cyrillic: Заблеће) is a village in the municipality of Ribnik, Bosnia and Herzegovina.
