= Ljeljenča =

Ljeljenča Љељенча (Serbian)
- Village (Selo)
- Interactive map of Ljeljenča

Population (2013)
  - Total: 976
- Bosnian 2013 census
- Time zone: UTC+1 (Central European Time (CET))
  - Summer (DST): UTC+2 (Central European Summer Time (CEST))
- Area code: +387 55

Ljeljenča (Serbian Cyrillic: Љељенча) is a village located west of the municipality of Bijeljina in Republika Srpska, Bosnia and Herzegovina. According to the results of the 2013 Bosnian census, it has 976 inhabitants.
