= Vlahovići, Ljubinje =

Vlahovići Влаховићи
- Village
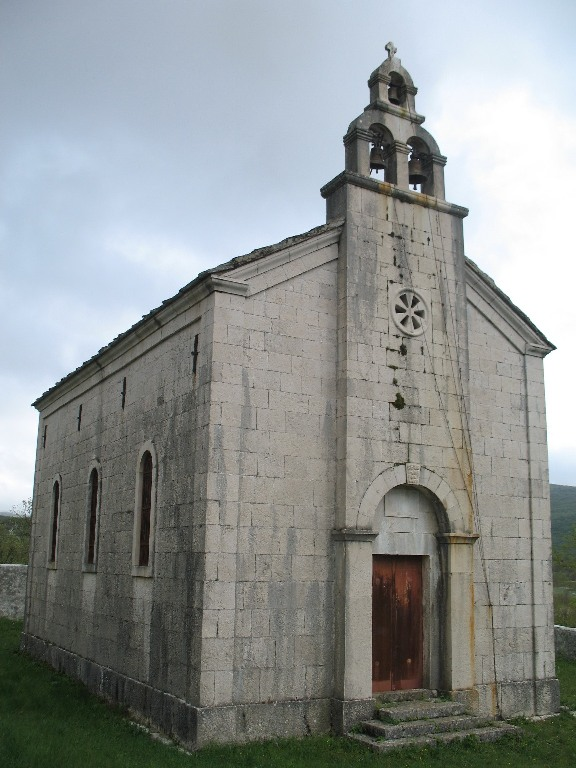
- Orthodox Church of St. Lazar

- Location within Bosnia and Herzegovina
- Coordinates: 43°1′27.14″N 18°7′46.32″E
- Country: Bosnia and Herzegovina
- Entity: Republika Srpska
- Municipality: Ljubinje
- Time zone: UTC+1 (CET)
  - Summer (DST): UTC+2 (CEST)

Vlahovići (Serbian Cyrillic: Влаховићи) is a village in the municipality of Ljubinje, Republika Srpska, Bosnia and Herzegovina.
