= Johovac (Doboj) =

Johovac Јоховац
- Village
- Location within Bosnia and Herzegovina
- Coordinates: 44°49′30″N 18°02′27″E
- Country: Bosnia and Herzegovina
- Entity: Republika Srpska
- Municipality: Doboj

Population (2013)
  - Total: 424
- Time zone: UTC+1 (CET)
  - Summer (DST): UTC+2 (CEST)

Johovac (Cyrillic: Јоховац) is a village in the municipality of Doboj, Republika Srpska, Bosnia and Herzegovina.
