= Piperi =

Piperi may refer to:

- Piperi (island), an island in Greece
- Piperi (tribe), a clan in Montenegro
- Piperi, Lopare, a village in the municipality of Lopare, Republika Srpska, Bosnia and Herzegovina
- Piperi (Čelić), a village in the municipality of Čelić, Federation of Bosnia and Herzegovina, Bosnia and Herzegovina
