= Krivača, Bileća =

Coordinates: 42°52′02″N 18°21′34″E

Krivača Кривача
- Village
- Location within Republika Srpska
- Country: Bosnia and Herzegovina
- Entity: Republika Srpska
- Municipality: Bileća
- Time zone: UTC+1 (CET)
  - Summer (DST): UTC+2 (CEST)

Krivača (Serbian Cyrillic: Кривача) is a village in the municipality of Bileća, Republika Srpska, Bosnia and Herzegovina.
