= Podgrab =

- Village
- Location within Bosnia and Herzegovina
- Coordinates: 43°45′N 18°47′E
- Country: Bosnia and Herzegovina
- Entity: Republika Srpska
- Municipality: Pale
- Time zone: UTC+1 (CET)
  - Summer (DST): UTC+2 (CEST)

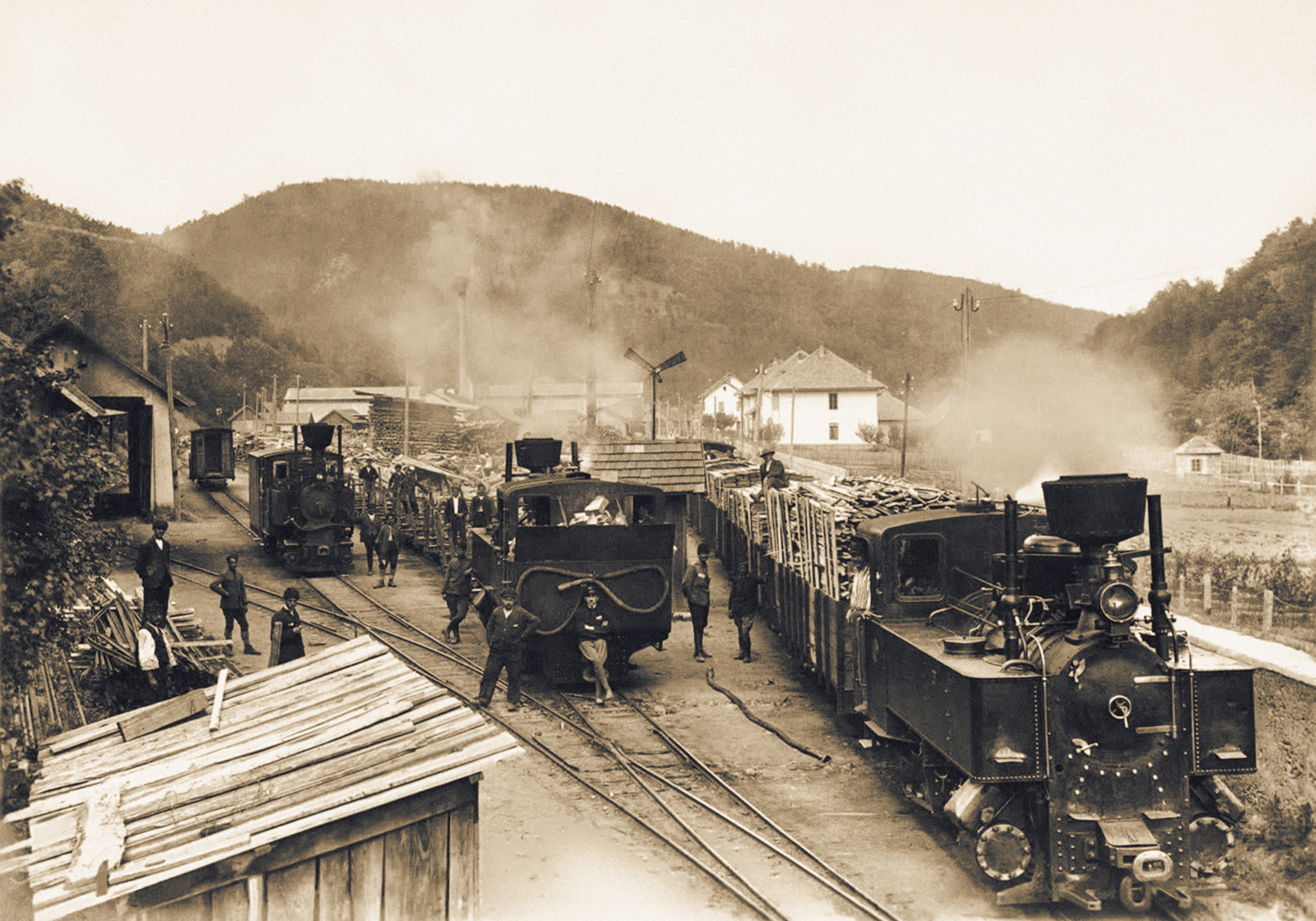
Forest railway operations of Giuseppe Feltrinelli & Co. at Podgrab

Podgrab (Serbian Cyrillic: Подграб) is a village in the municipality of Pale, Bosnia and Herzegovina.

Podgrab was an industrial town before World War II, with a steam-powered sawmill built by Giuseppe Feltrinelli & Co. The area was a place of numerous forest railway operations stretching out to the north and south of town. The privately owned and run forest railway network was connected to the state-operated Bosnian Eastern Railway line.
