= Glavičice =

Village in Bosnia and Herzegovina

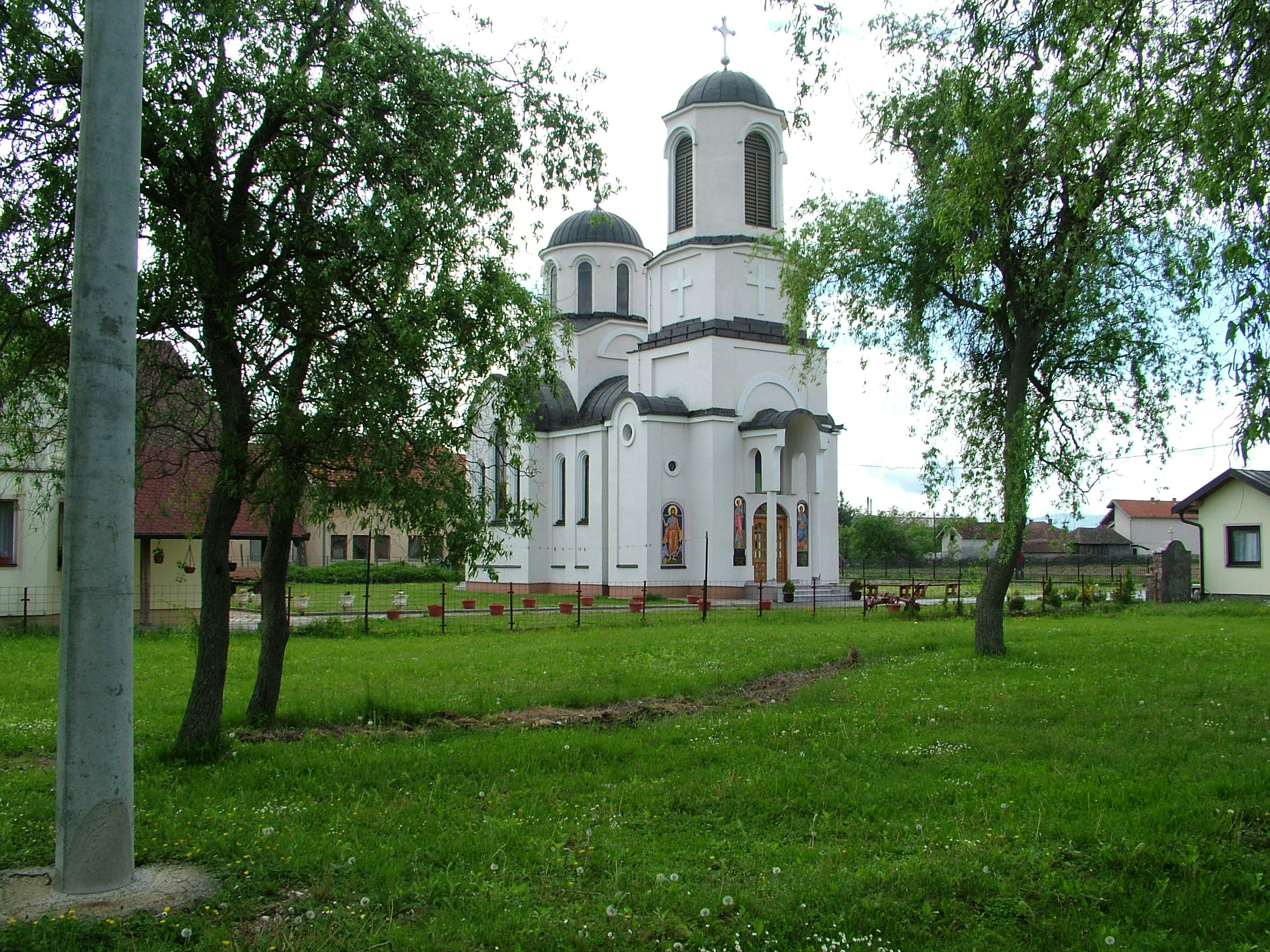
Local church.

Glavičice (Serbian Cyrillic: Главичице) is a village located south of the city of Bijeljina in Republika Srpska, Bosnia and Herzegovina. It is located close to the border with Serbia. According to the 1991 census, the village had 1,366 inhabitants, the majority Serbs.

The Serbian Orthodox Church has a local parish centered in the village, the Glavičice parish (Парохија главичичка).

Serbian footballer Savo Milošević hails from the village.
