= Godijeno =

- Village
- Location within Bosnia and Herzegovina
- Coordinates: 43°29′N 18°53′E
- Country: Bosnia and Herzegovina
- Entity: Republika Srpska
- Municipality: Foča

Population (2013)
  - Total: 22
- Time zone: UTC+1 (CET)
  - Summer (DST): UTC+2 (CEST)

Godijeno (Serbian Cyrillic: Годијено) is a village in the municipality of Foča, Republika Srpska, Bosnia and Herzegovina.
