= Rudo =

Coordinates: 43°37′N 19°22′E

Rudo Рудо
- Town and municipality
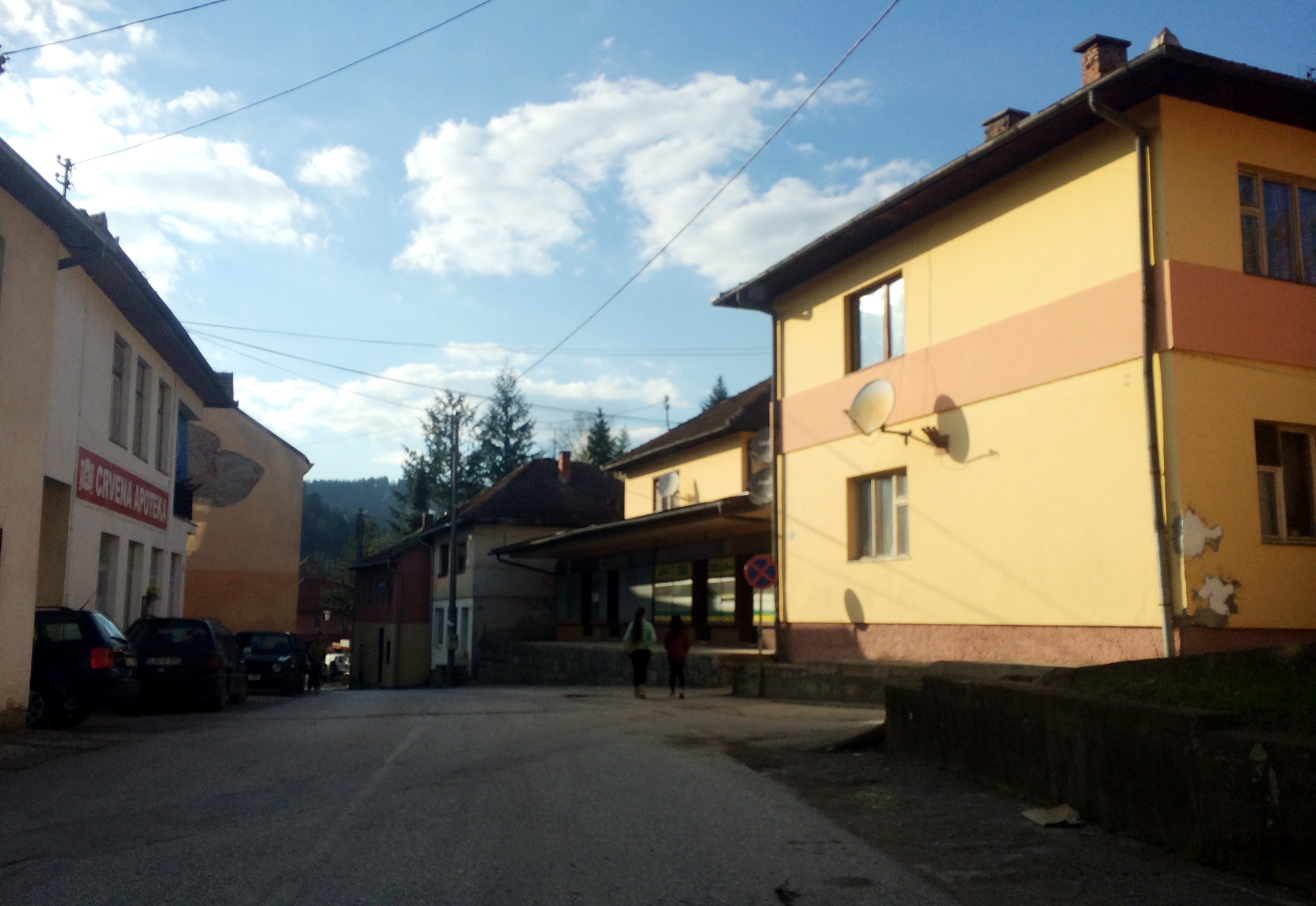

- Location of Rudo within Bosnia and Herzegovina

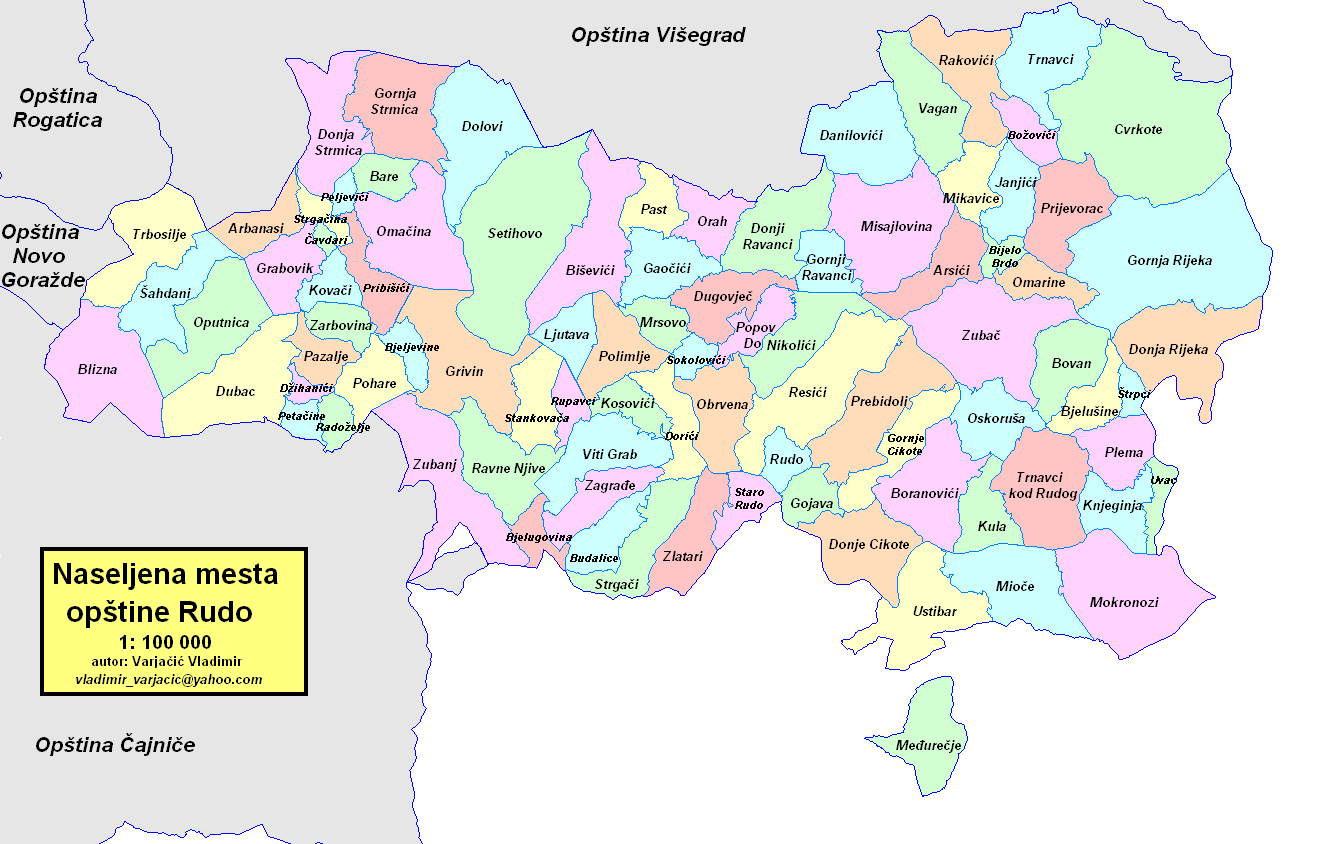
- Country: Bosnia and Herzegovina
- Entity: Republika Srpska
- Geographical region: Podrinje

Government
  - Municipal mayor: Dragoljub Bogdanović (SNSD)

Area
  - Total: 347.63 km^{2} (134.22 sq mi)

Population (2013 census)
  - Total: 7,963
  - Density: 22.91/km^{2} (59.33/sq mi)
- Time zone: UTC+1 (CET)
  - Summer (DST): UTC+2 (CEST)
- Area code: 58

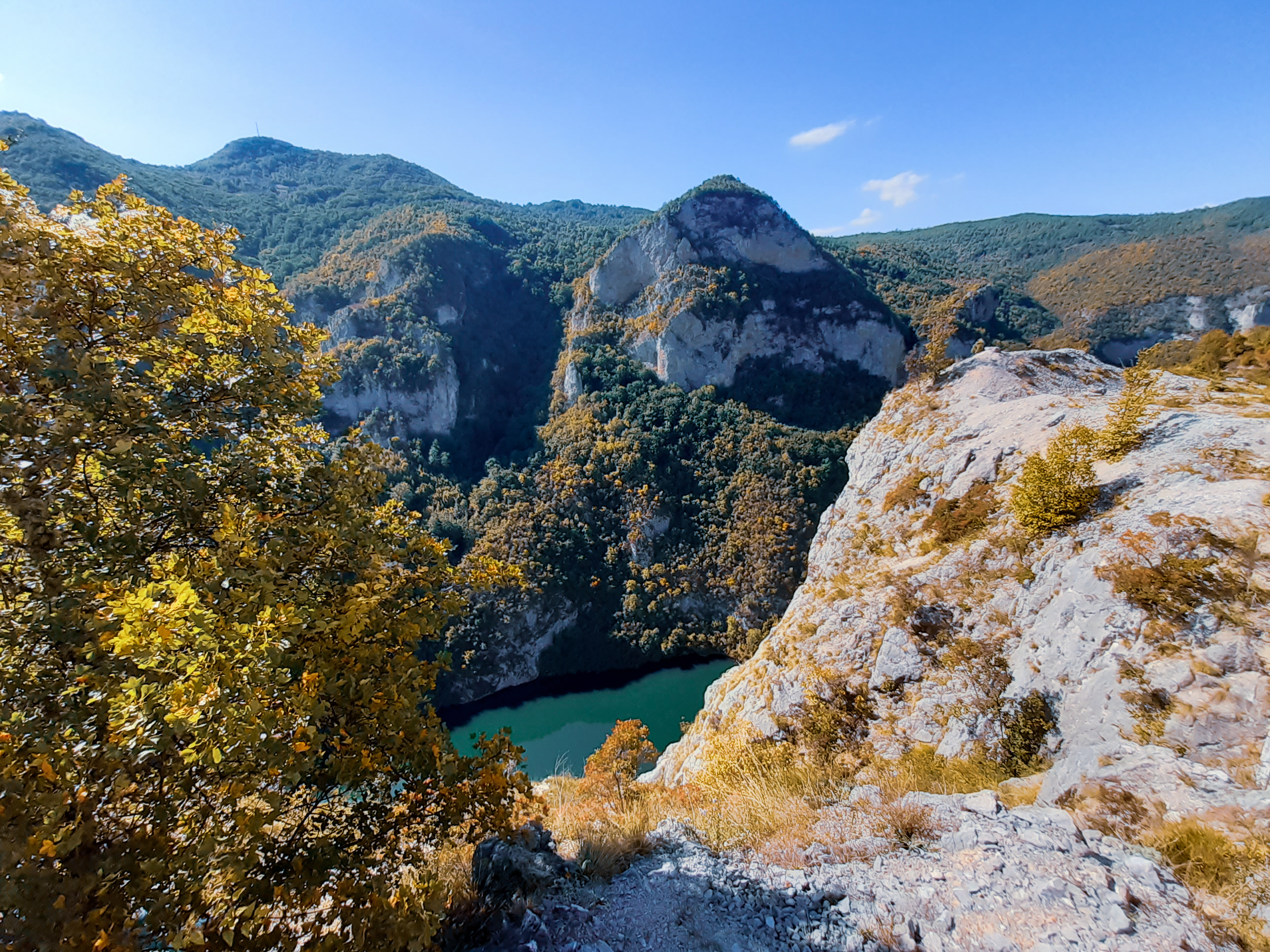
Lim river

Rudo (Serbian Cyrillic: Рудо) is a town and municipality in Republika Srpska, Bosnia and Herzegovina. As of 2013, it has a population of 7,963 inhabitants, while the town of Rudo has a population of 1,949 inhabitants.

It is famous throughout former Yugoslav republics as the birthplace of the 1st Proletarian Brigade formed by Yugoslav Partisans.

== History ==
The town of Rudo was established in 1555 by Sokollu Mustafa Pasha, a close relative of Ottoman Vizier Sokollu Mehmed Pasha. A stone mosque, bridge over the Lim, hamam, inn, mekteb (school), tekke, some shops and houses were built. It was mentioned by Evliya Çelebi (1611–1682). It was flooded in 1896, and then expanded into an urban settlement. Following the collapse of the Republic of Užice and the time spent in the village of Drenova leader of Yugoslav Partisans arrived to Rudo on 21 December 1941. The 1st Proletarian Brigade of the Yugoslav Partisans was established in Rudo on 22 December 1941. A monument dedicated to the Brigade was erected in 1961, with a museum subsequently being opened a decade later.

== Settlements ==
- Arbanasi
- Arsići
- Bare
- Bijelo Brdo
- Biševići
- Bjelugovina
- Bjelušine
- Bjeljevine
- Blizna
- Boranovići
- Bovan
- Božovići
- Budalice
- Cvrkote
- Čavdari
- Danilovići
- Dolovi
- Donja Rijeka
- Donja Strmica
- Donje Cikote
- Donji Ravanci
- Dorići
- Dubac
- Dugovječ
- Džihanići
- Gaočići
- Gojava
- Gornja Rijeka
- Gornja Strmica
- Gornje Cikote
- Gornji Ravanci
- Grabovik
- Grivin
- Janjići
- Knjeginja
- Kosovići
- Kovači
- Kula
- Ljutava
- Međurečje
- Mikavice
- Mioče
- Misajlovina
- Mokronozi
- Mrsovo
- Nikolići
- Obrvena
- Omačina
- Omarine
- Oputnica
- Orah
- Oskoruša
- Past
- Pazalje
- Peljevići
- Petačine
- Plema
- Pohare
- Polimlje
- Popov Do
- Prebidoli
- Pribišići
- Prijevorac
- Radoželje
- Rakovići
- Ravne Njive
- Resići
- Rudo
- Rupavci
- Setihovo
- Sokolovići
- Stankovača
- Staro Rudo
- Strgači
- Strgačina
- Šahdani
- Štrpci
- Trbosilje
- Trnavci
- Trnavci kod Rudog
- Ustibar
- Uvac
- Vagan
- Viti Grab
- Zagrađe
- Zarbovina
- Zlatari
- Zubač
- Zubanj

== Demographics ==
=== Population ===
Population of settlement – Rudo municipality
	Settlement	1971.	1981.	1991.	2013.
	Total	15,982	13,601	11,571	7,963
1	Boranovići			272	245
2	Gojava			199	213
3	Knjeginja			98	283
4	Mioče			469	326
5	Mokronozi			611	458
6	Rudo	1,258	1,760	2,077	1,949
7	Štrpci			308	255
8	Trnavci kod Rudog			232	259
9	Uvac			515	366

=== Ethnic composition ===
Ethnic composition – Rudo town
	2013.	1991.	1981.	1971.
Total	1,949 (100,0%)	2,077 (100,0%)	1,760 (100,0%)	1,258 (100,0%)
Serbs		1,203 (57,92%)	987 (56,08%)	677 (53,82%)
Bosniaks		731 (35,19%)	554 (31,48%)	488 (38,79%)
Others		73 (3,515%)	6 (0,341%)	3 (0,238%)
Yugoslavs		68 (3,274%)	136 (7,727%)	22 (1,749%)
Croats		2 (0,096%)	10 (0,568%)	6 (0,477%)
Montenegrins			58 (3,295%)	58 (4,610%)
Macedonians			5 (0,284%)	2 (0,159%)
Albanians			4 (0,227%)	2 (0,159%)

Ethnic composition – Rudo municipality
	2013.	1991.	1981.	1971.
Total	7,963 (100,0%)	11,571 (100,0%)	13,601 (100,0%)	15,982 (100,0%)
Serbs	7,241 (90,93%)	8,150 (70,43%)	8,699 (63,96%)	10,155 (63,54%)
Bosniaks	677 (8,502%)	3,130 (27,05%)	4,382 (32,22%)	5,532 (34,61%)
Others	36 (0,452%)	180 (1,556%)	48 (0,353%)	56 (0,350%)
Croats	9 (0,113%)	5 (0,043%)	24 (0,176%)	18 (0,113%)
Yugoslavs		106 (0,916%)	312 (2,294%)	80 (0,501%)
Montenegrins			121 (0,890%)	94 (0,588%)
Macedonians			7 (0,051%)	14 (0,088%)
Albanians			5 (0,037%)	33 (0,206%)
Slovenes			3 (0,022%)	

== Trivia ==
It appears in Ivo Andrić's story "The Beys of Rudo."

== Notable people ==
- Sokollu Mehmed Pasha, Ottoman Grand Vizier of Rumelia
- Stevan Moljević, politician
- Vojislav Topalović, politician
- Vladislav Topalović, archpriest-stavrophor
- Dragoljub Mićović, architect

== See also ==
- Municipalities of Republika Srpska
