= Bogatići =

Bogatići Богатићи
- Village
- Location within Bosnia and Herzegovina
- Coordinates: 43°43′N 18°25′E
- Country: Bosnia and Herzegovina
- Entity: Republika Srpska
- Municipality: Trnovo

Population (1991)
  - Total: 77
- Time zone: UTC+1 (CET)
  - Summer (DST): UTC+2 (CEST)

Bogatići (Serbian Cyrillic: Богатићи) is a village in the municipality of Trnovo, Republika Srpska, Bosnia and Herzegovina.

According to the 1991 census it had a population of 77 people.
