= Podromanija =

Podromanija Подроманија
- Village
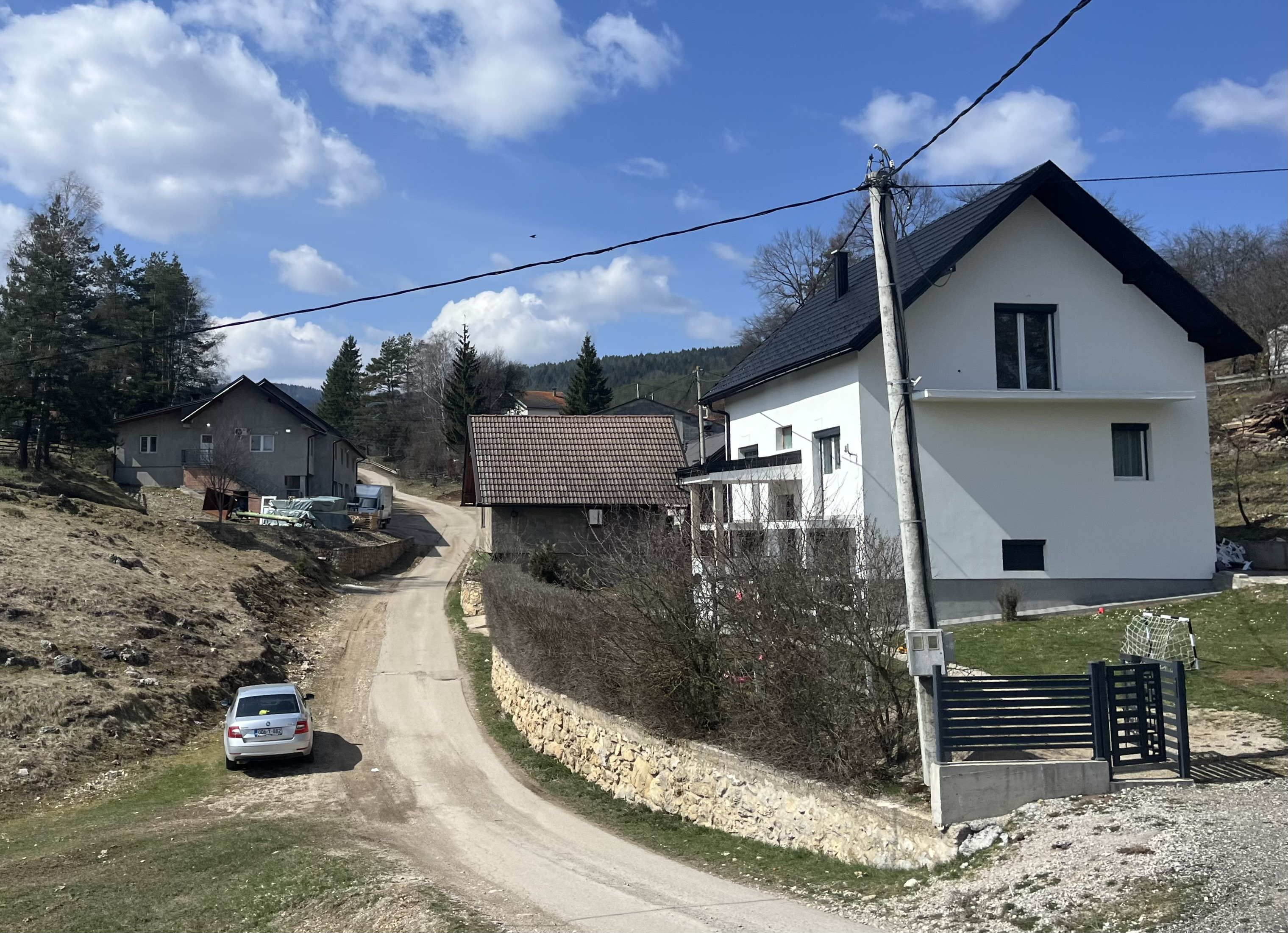

- Location within Bosnia and Herzegovina
- Coordinates: 43°55′09″N 18°46′23″E
- Country: Bosnia and Herzegovina
- Entity: Republika Srpska
- Municipality: Sokolac
- Time zone: UTC+1 (CET)
  - Summer (DST): UTC+2 (CEST)

Podromanija (Serbian Cyrillic: Подроманија) is a village in the municipality of Sokolac, Republika Srpska, Bosnia and Herzegovina.

== Geography ==
The village, named "below the Romanija", is located within the Romanija geographical region.

== History ==
In 1991 the area was incorporated into the SAO Romanija, a Serb-established autonomous province, which later merged with other SAOs to form Republika Srpska in 1992.

== Demographic history ==
According to the 1991 census, the village had 377 inhabitants, of whom 360 were Serbs (95,49%), 12 Muslims (3,18%), and others. The "local community", or mjesna zajednica (MZ) of Podromanija had 560 inhabitants, out of whom 539 were Serbs (96,25%), 15 Muslims (2,68%), and others.
