= Ustiprača =

Ustiprača Устипрача
- Village
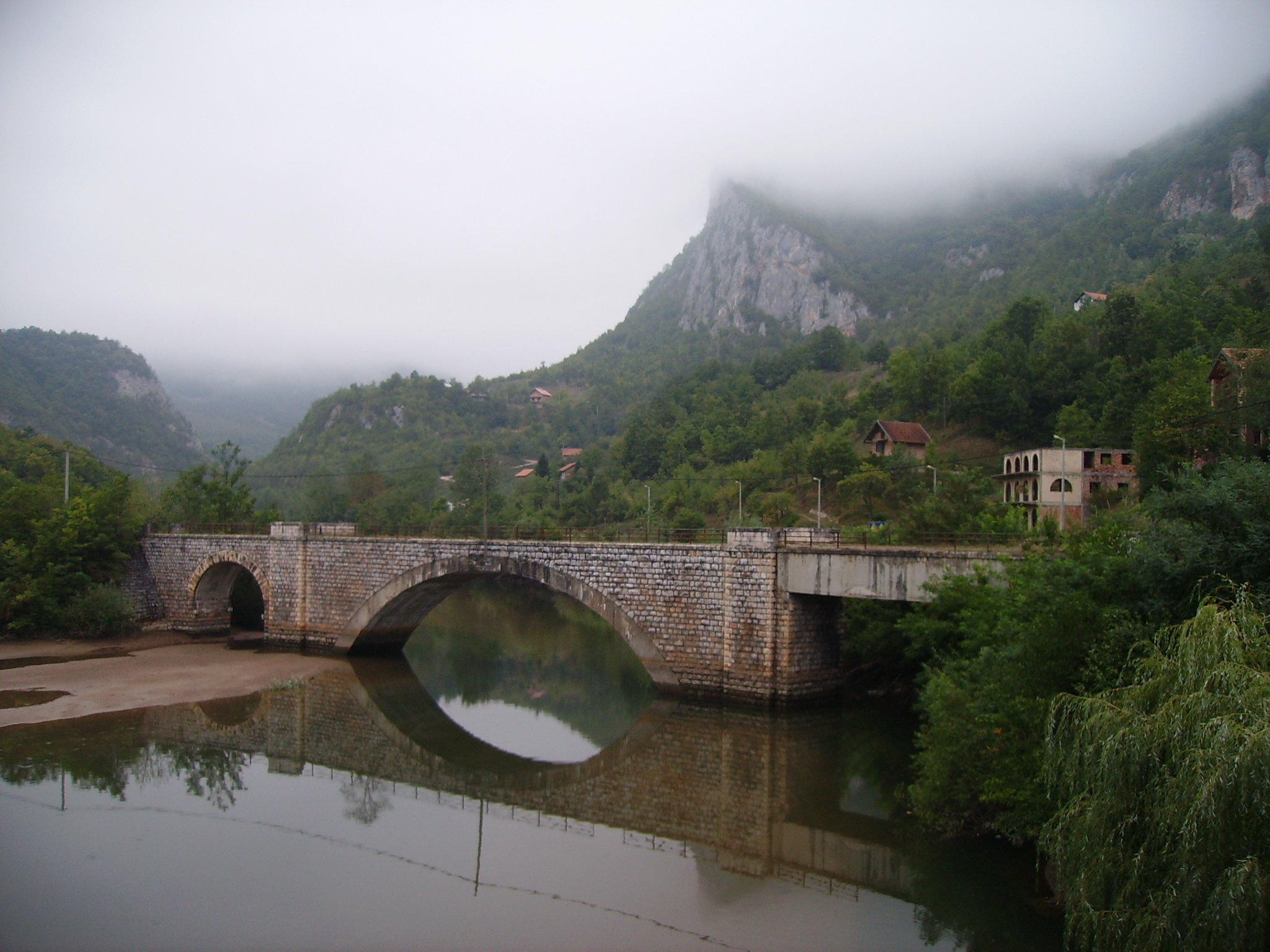
- Bridge over the river Prača in Ustiprača

- Location within Bosnia and Herzegovina
- Coordinates: 43°41′27″N 19°05′20″E
- Country: Bosnia and Herzegovina
- Republic: Republika Srpska
- Municipality: Novo Goražde

Population (2013)
  - Total: 278
- Time zone: UTC+1 (CET)
  - Summer (DST): UTC+2 (CEST)
- Postal code: 73000

Ustiprača (Serbian Cyrillic: Устипрача) is a village in the municipality of Novo Goražde, Republika Srpska, Bosnia and Herzegovina. According to the 2013 census, the village has a population of 278.

Between 2004 and 2005, the village was the namesake of the municipality, which, after its name of Srpsko Goražde (Serbian Cyrillic: Српско Горажде) was declared unconstitutional, temporarily changed its name to Ustiprača.

== Demographics ==
=== Ethnic composition ===
Ethnicity	Population (2013 census)	Population (1991 census)
Total	278 (100%)	498 (100%)
Bosniaks	100 (36%)	448 (90%)
Croats	0 (0%)	2 (0.4%)
Serbs	165 (59.4%)	37 (7.4%)
Yugoslavs	0 (0%)	5 (1%)
Others	13 (4.7%)	6 (1.2%)
