= Brod, Foča =

Brod
- Village
- Location within Bosnia and Herzegovina
- Coordinates: 43°29′17″N 18°44′52″E
- Country: Bosnia and Herzegovina
- Entity: Republika Srpska
- Municipality: Foča
- Time zone: UTC+1 (CET)
  - Summer (DST): UTC+2 (CEST)

Brod (Serbian Cyrillic: Брод) is a village in the municipality of Foča, Republika Srpska, Bosnia and Herzegovina.
