= Velečevo =

- Village
- Location within Bosnia and Herzegovina
- Coordinates: 44°30′20″N 16°49′49″E
- Country: Bosnia and Herzegovina
- Entity: Federation of Bosnia and Herzegovina; Republika Srpska
- Canton Region: Una-Sana; Banja Luka
- Municipality: Ključ; Ribnik

Area
  - Total: 1.77 sq mi (4.59 km^{2})

Population (2013)
  - Total: 409
  - Density: 231/sq mi (89.1/km^{2})
- Time zone: UTC+1 (CET)
  - Summer (DST): UTC+2 (CEST)

Velečevo is a village in the municipalities of Ribnik, Republika Srpska and Ključ, Bosnia and Herzegovina.

== Demographics ==
According to the 2013 census, its population was 409, all living in Ključ and none in the Ribnik part.

Ethnicity in 2013
Ethnicity	Number	Percentage
Bosniaks	404	98.8%
other/undeclared	5	1.2%
Total	409	100%
