= Mokronozi =

Village in Bosnia and Herzegovina

- Village
- Location within Republika Srpska Location within Bosnia and Herzegovina
- Coordinates: 43°35′32″N 19°28′42″E
- Country: Bosnia and Herzegovina
- Entity: Republika Srpska
- Municipality: Rudo

Population (2013)
  - Total: 458
- Time zone: UTC+1 (CET)
  - Summer (DST): UTC+2 (CEST)

Mokronozi (Serbian Cyrillic: Мокронози) is a village in the municipality of Rudo, Republic of Srpska, Bosnia and Herzegovina. It is on the border between Serbia and Srpska. According to Population Census in 2013, the whole population of this village is 458.
