= Krupac, Istočna Ilidža =

Krupac Крупац
- Village
- Location within Bosnia and Herzegovina
- Coordinates: 43°46′34″N 18°21′50″E
- Country: Bosnia and Herzegovina
- Entity: Republika Srpska; Federation of Bosnia and Herzegovina
- Region Canton: Sarajevo; Sarajevo
- Municipality: Ilidža; Istočna Ilidža

Area
  - Total: 3.60 sq mi (9.32 km^{2})

Population (2013)
  - Total: 250
  - Density: 69/sq mi (27/km^{2})
- Time zone: UTC+1 (CET)
  - Summer (DST): UTC+2 (CEST)

Krupac (Serbian Cyrillic: Крупац) is a village in the municipalities of Istočna Ilidža (Republika Srpska) and Ilidža, Bosnia and Herzegovina.

== Demographics ==
According to the 2013 census, its population was 250, with 13 people living in Ilidža and 237 in Istočna Ilidža.

Ethnicity in 2013
Ethnicity	Number	Percentage
Serbs	240	96.0%
Bosniaks	10	4.0%
Total	250	100%
