= Uvac, Rudo =

Uvac Увац
- Village
- Location within Bosnia and Herzegovina
- Coordinates: 43°36′0″N 19°29′10″E
- Country: Bosnia and Herzegovina
- Entity: Republika Srpska
- Municipality: Rudo
- Time zone: UTC+1 (CET)
  - Summer (DST): UTC+2 (CEST)

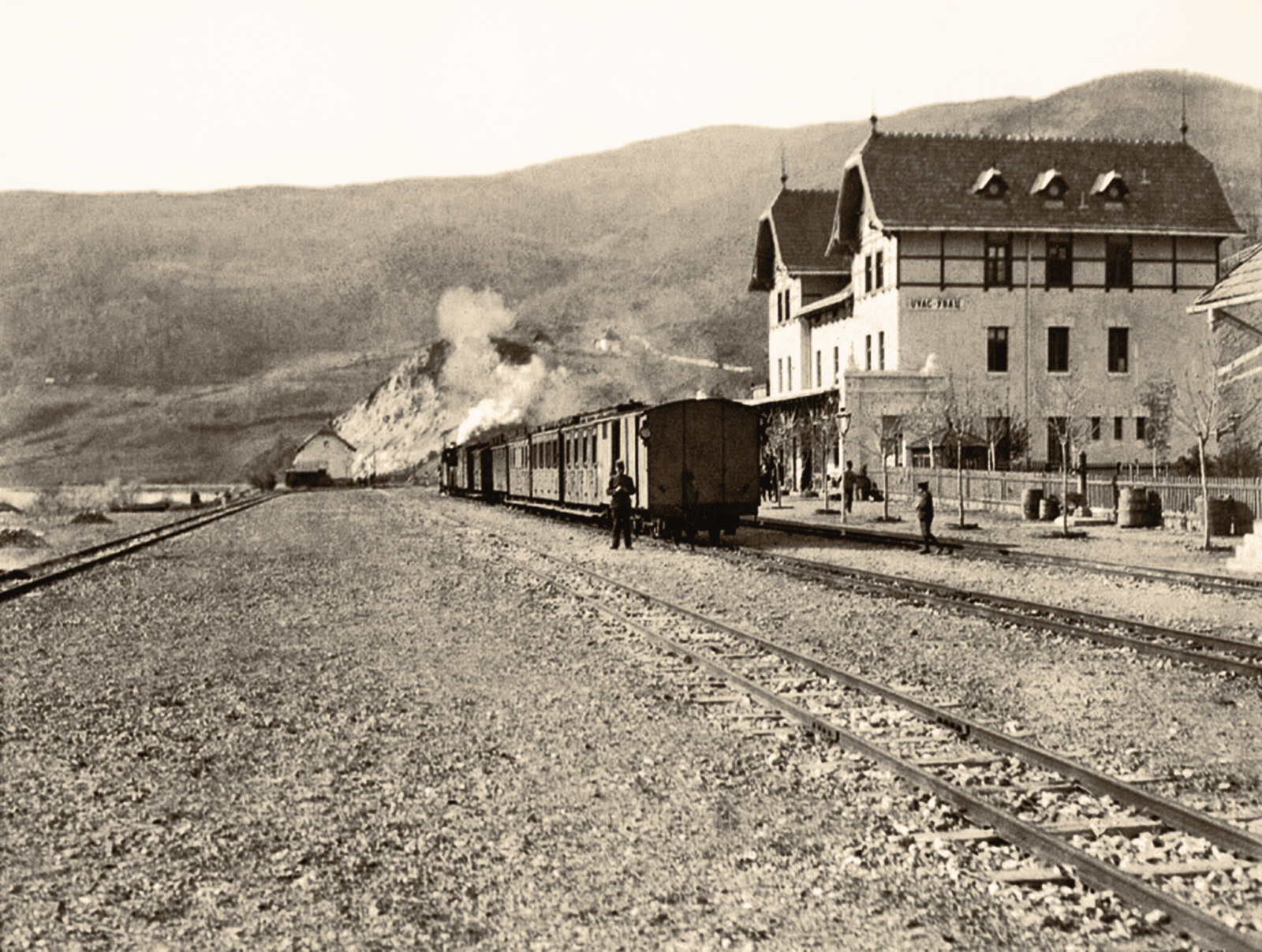
Uvac train station in 1906

Uvac (Serbian Cyrillic: Увац) is a village in the municipality of Rudo, Republic of Srpska, Bosnia and Herzegovina. It is on the border between Serbia and Republic of Srpska. Uvac was one of the two end stations of the Bosnian Eastern Railway, which had been built from Sarajevo to Uvac and Vardište during the Austro-Hungarian rule in Bosnia and Herzegovina. Construction of the line started in 1903. It was completed in 1906, using the 760 mm (2 ft 5 15/16 in) track gauge. With the cost of 75 million gold crowns, which approximately translates to 450 thousand gold crowns per kilometer, it was one of the most expensive railways in the world built by that time. The extension to Priboj was built in 1928, and opened for traffic on 1 January 1929. The line was closed down in 1978, and dismantled afterwards.
