= Donje Vardište =

Village in Bosnia and Herzegovina

- Village
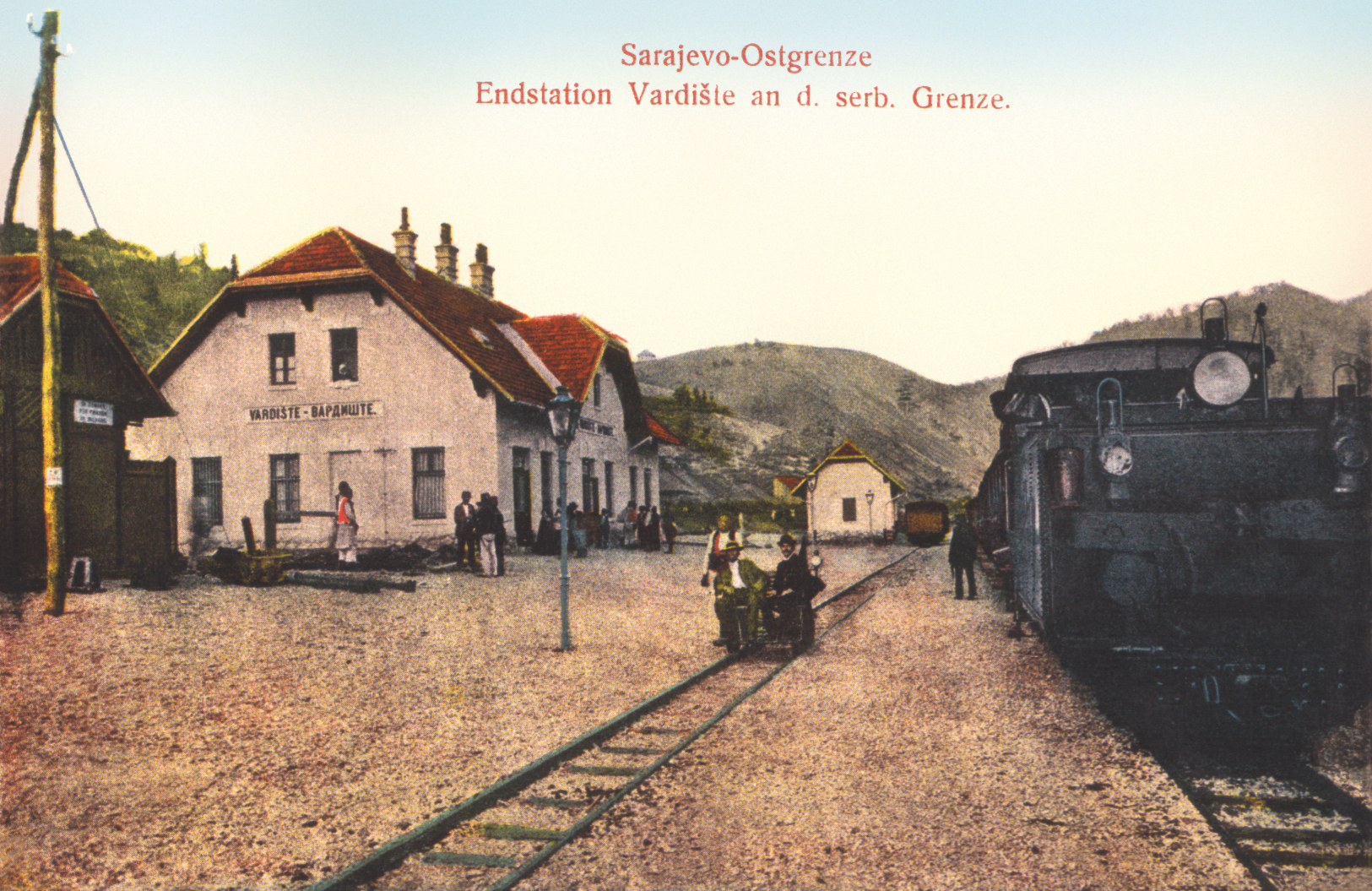
- Vardište train station in 1906

- Location within Bosnia and Herzegovina
- Coordinates: 43°45′40″N 19°27′20″E
- Country: Bosnia and Herzegovina
- Entity: Republika Srpska
- Municipality: Višegrad
- Time zone: UTC+1 (CET)
  - Summer (DST): UTC+2 (CEST)

Donje Vardište (Serbian Cyrillic: Доње Вардиште) is a village in the municipality of Višegrad, Bosnia and Herzegovina. It is on the border between (western) Serbia and (eastern) Bosnia and Herzegovina.

== Rzav river system ==
Confluence of the Beli and Crni Rzav, both of which originating in the western Serbia, is in the region of Donje Vardište. Here they create 72 km (45 mi) long the Rzav River, the river is the right tributary of the Drina river.

== Historical railway ==
Donje Vardište was one of the two end stations of the Bosnian Eastern Railway, which had been built from Sarajevo to Uvac and Vardište during the Austro-Hungarian rule in Bosnia and Herzegovina. Construction of the line started in 1903. It was completed in 1906, using the 760 mm (2 ft 5 15/16 in) track gauge. With the cost of 75 million gold crowns, which approximately translates to 450 thousand gold crowns per kilometer, it was one of the most expensive railways in the world built by that time. The line was eventually extended to Belgrade in 1928. Donje Vardište is today part of the narrow-gauge heritage railway Šargan Eight.
