= M-2.4 highway (Montenegro) =

Old road of Montenegro (before 2016)

M-2.4 highway
- Magistralni put M-2.4

Route information
- Part of E-851
- Length: 69.93 km (43.45 mi)
- Existed: 1973–2016

Major junctions
- West end: M-2 in Petrovac na Moru
- Sozina Tunnel in Haj Nehaj; R-22 in Ulcinj; R-17 in Vladimir

- East end: SH41 in Sukobin

Location
- Country: Montenegro
- Municipalities: Budva, Bar, Ulcinj

Highway system
- Transport in Montenegro; Motorways
| ← M-2.3 | → M-4 |

M-2.4 highway (Montenegrin: Magistralni put M-2.4) was a Montenegrin roadway.

The M-2.4 highway served as an extension of the M-2 highway, serving Bar and Ulcinj.

== History ==
The M-2.4 highway was officially opened for traffic in 1973.

In January 2016, the Ministry of Transport and Maritime Affairs published bylaw on categorisation of state roads. With new categorisation, M-2.4 highway was merged with the M-1 highway.

== Major intersections ==
| Municipality | Location | km | mi | Destinations | Notes |
|---|---|---|---|---|---|
| Budva | Petrovac na Moru | 0 | 0 | M-2 – Budva, Podgorica | |
| Bar | Haj Nehaj | | | Sozina Tunnel | To Podgorica via M-1.1 |
| Ulcinj | Ulcinj | | | R-22 – Ada Bojana | |
| Ulcinj | Vladimir | | | R-15 – Ostros, Virpazar | |
| Ulcinj | Sukobin | | | SH41 – Shkodër (Albania) | Border crossing with Albania |
