= Transport in Montenegro =

== Airports ==
Montenegro has two international airports, with their IATA Airport Codes:

- Podgorica Airport - TGD
- Tivat Airport - TIV

Both airports were thoroughly reconstructed in 2006, with a new passenger terminal being built at Podgorica Airport. The airports had a combined traffic of 3,095,315 passengers in 2025. Both airports had more than 1 million passengers for the first time in 2017.

There are also airports at Berane, Žabljak and Nikšić, but those are used mostly for general aviation, and are not equipped to handle larger aircraft. Ulcinj has a grass-type airport.

View chart definition.

== Railways ==
total: 250 km
standard gauge: (1,435 mm (4 ft 8 1/2 in)) 250 km
narrow gauge: none

=== Rail links with adjacent countries ===
- Serbia - yes - same gauge, couplings, brakes, electrification system
- Albania - yes - used for freight only
- Croatia - no direct links
- Bosnia and Herzegovina - no direct links

=== Overview ===
The Montenegrin part of the Belgrade–Bar railway is the backbone of the Montenegrin railway system. It opened in 1976, and then was a state-of-the art railway, with features such as the Mala Rijeka viaduct (highest railway viaduct in the world) and the 6.2 km long Sozina tunnel. About one-third of the Montenegrin part of the railway is in tunnels or on viaducts.

The railway suffered from chronic underfunding in the 1990s, resulting in it deteriorating and becoming unsafe. This culminated in the 2006 Bioče train disaster, when a passenger train derailed, killing 47 passengers. Efforts are being made to thoroughly reconstruct this railway. The European Investment Bank (EIB) agreed in January 2023 to provide finance of EUR 76 million for rail improvements on the Bar – Podgorica – Vrbnica rail line.

The Nikšić-Podgorica railway (56,6 km long) was built in 1948 as a narrow gauge railway, and upgraded to standard gauge in 1965. From 1992 to 2012, it has been used solely for freight traffic, particularly bauxite from the Nikšić mine to the Podgorica Aluminium Plant, with the maximum speed on the railway reduced to 30 km/h. Railway was reconstructed and electrified in the 2006-2012 period, with passenger traffic starting in 2012 and maximum speeds being between 75 and 100 km/h.

The Podgorica–Shkodër railway, which extends to Tirana, has been used exclusively for freight traffic for some time. Parts in Albania were damaged in 1997, but the connection was restored in 2002. There are plans to reconstruct the railway and re-introduce passenger traffic, as it is important for the interests of both Montenegro and Albania. Currently, the railways are undergoing planned repairs and modernization with a budget, given by the government for 2009, of 9.7 million euros.

== Roads ==
Road network of Montenegro including Motorways, Main roads and Regional roads

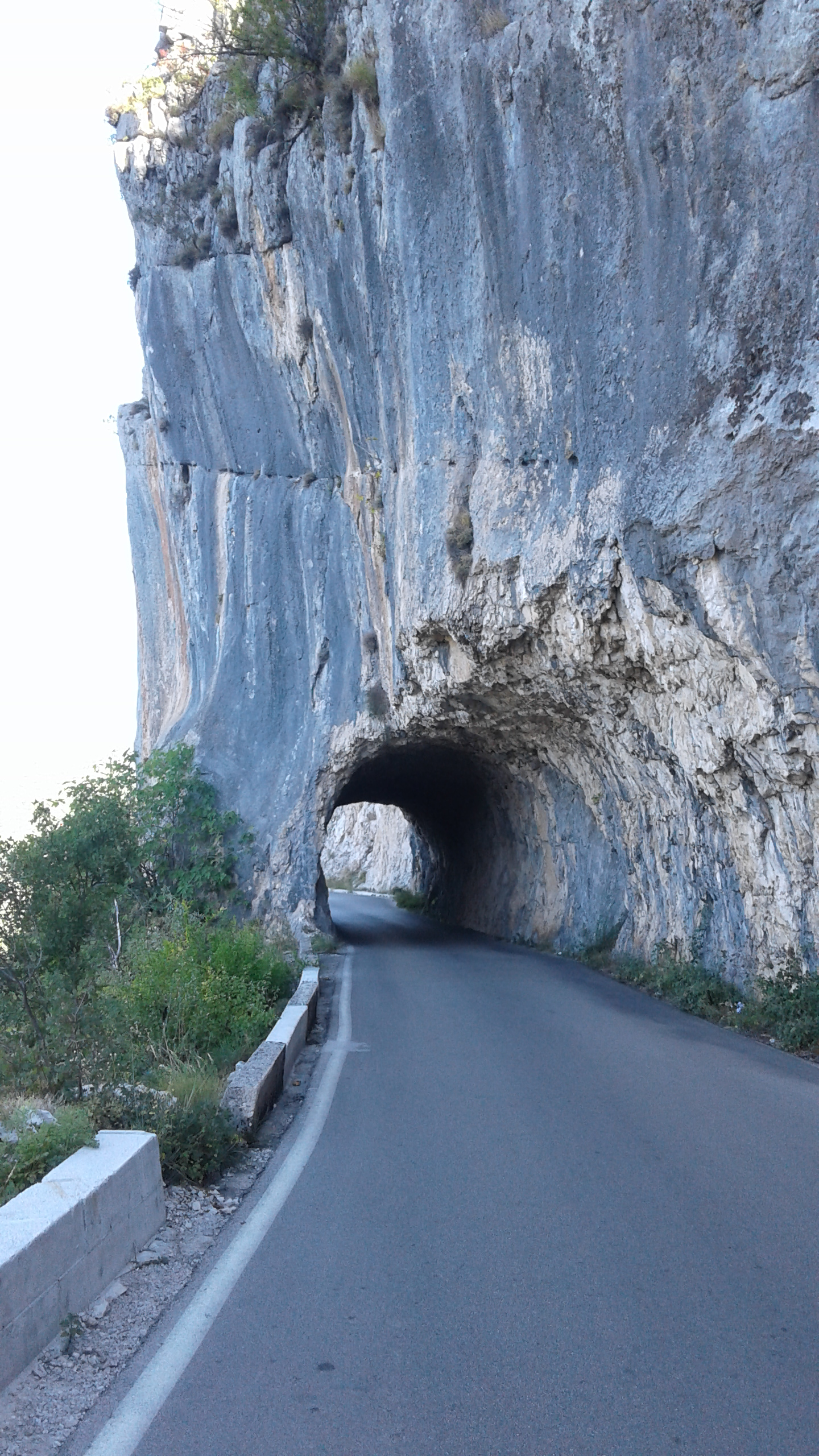
A road tunnel in Montenegro, near the Ostrog Monastery (September, 2018).

The overall length of roads in Montenegro is 5,277 km, of which 1,729 km is paved. The roads in Montenegro are categorized in the following way:

- Motorways (Autoputevi) - The first stretch of the Bar - Boljare motorway was opened in July 2022 - a 41 km long section from Mateševo (near Kolašin) to Smokovac (near Podgorica). The second motorway, the Montenegrin section of the Adriatic–Ionian motorway is in initial planning phase.
- Main roads (Magistralni putevi) are roads connecting bigger cities or economic regions of Montenegro. Most of the main roads of Montenegro are listed with International E-road network, and are locally labeled with M letter followed by a number. Typically, these are paved roads of single carriageway type, featuring one lane per direction, with frequent addition of a third overtaking lane on sections with steep gradients. Curve radii usually allow speeds of up to 80 km/h, and width of a single traffic lane is usually at least 3m. Main roads listed with International E-road network in Montenegro are:
  - E-65 / E-80, locally M-1, M-1.1, M-2, A-1, R-13 and M-5 (Debeli Brijeg/Croatia - Petrovac - Sutomore - Podgorica - Kolašin - Berane - Rožaje - border with Serbia)
  - E-762, locally M-4 and M-3 (Border with Albania - Božaj - Tuzi - Podgorica - Danilovgrad - Nikšić - Plužine - Šćepan Polje - border with Bosnia & Herzegovina)
  - E-763, locally M-2 (Bijelo Polje - border with Serbia)
  - E-851, locally M-1 (Sutomore - Bar - Krute - Ulcinj - Sukobin - border with Albania)

Sections of E65/E80 (Debeli Brijeg - Petrovac) and E851 (Petrovac - Ulcinj) together make up for the Montenegrin section of Adriatic Highway.

- Regional roads (Regionalni putevi) are road connections between regional centers, and connections to the other regional roads, main roads or road network of other countries. Typically, these are paved roads, but with smaller curve radii and narrower lanes than those of the main roads. Thus, lower speed limits are more common on regional roads. These roads are locally labeled with R letter followed by a number.
- Local roads (Lokalni putevi) are road connections of villages and other settlements of local communities. Quality of road infrastructure varies wildly between local roads, so these can be both unpaved dirt roads, as well as roads resembling regional roads in quality and appearance.

In January 2016, after many years, categories of roads have been changed to more reflect their importance and quality. Before that categorization of some of the roads had become obsolete in some cases, with upgrades of some road sections, and decay of the others. For example, road Kolašin - Mateševo - Andrijevica road, was labelled as Main road, is greatly inferior in quality to the Šavnik - Žabljak road, which was designated as a Regional road.

In recent years roads connecting Podgorica and the coastal towns have improved significantly with the completion of Sozina tunnel and numerous upgrades of roads towards Cetinje, Budva and Bar. Sozina tunnel shortened the journey from Podgorica to Bar to under half an hour and made the trip significantly safer.

In the north, the road from Podgorica to Kolašin through Morača canyon to Serbia is considered the bottleneck of Montenegrin road network, as it is a curvy mountainous road, often unsafe during the winter. Bar - Boljare motorway is envisioned as a replacement for this corridor. In 2015, work has begun on section of Bar - Boljare motorway that would bypass the canyon. Long term plans also include the Montenegrin section of Adriatic–Ionian motorway as a significant transit link.

There is a proposed route from the city of Podgorica to Gusinje. The highway, expected to go through northwestern Albania, (from Grabom to Vermosh), will mean a journey time to Gusinje and Plav of about half an hour.

Also, the Verige bridge spanning the Bay of Kotor and part of the Adriatic Highway is planned to be built in the future.

=== Main roads ===
This is a list of all main roads in Montenegro.

Designation	Route
M-1	Debeli Brijeg/Croatia - Meljine (M-12) - Lipci (M-8) - Kotor (R-1) - Krtolska crossroad (M-11) - Budva (M-10) - Petrovac (M-2) - Sutomore (M-1.1) - Bar (R-28 and R-29) - Ulcinj (R-22) - Krute (R-29) Vladimir (R-15) - Sukobin/Albania
M-1.1	Sutomore (M-1) - Sozina Tunnel - Virpazar (M-2)
M-2	Petrovac (M-1) - Sotonići - Virpazar (M-1.1 and R-15) - Golubovci - Podgorica (M-3, M-4 and R-27) - Bioče (R-13) - Mioska (R-21) - Kolašin (R-13) - Mojkovac (R-10) - Slijepač Most (R-11) - Ribarevina (M-5) - Bijelo Polje - Barski most/Serbia
M-3	Šćepan Polje/Bosnia and Herzegovina - Plužine (R-16) - Jasenovo Polje (M-6) - Vir (R-7) - Nikšić (M-7) - Cerovo (R-23) - Danilovgrad (R-14) - Podgorica (M-10 and M-2)
M-4	Podgorica (M-2) - Tuzi - Božaj/Albania
M-5	Ribarevina (M-2) - Berane (R-2) - Budimlja (R-12) - Kalače (R-12) - Rožaje (R-5) - Most Zeleni (R-6) - Dračenovac/Serbia
M-6	Ranče/Serbia - Trlica (R-11) - Pljevlja (R-18) - Đurđevića Tara (R-10) - Vrela (R-26) - Žabljak - Virak (R-20) - Pošćenski kraj (R-16) - Šavnik (R-20) - Jasenovo Polje (M-3)
M-7	Nikšić (M-3)- Riđani (R-17) - Vilusi (M-8 and M-9) - Ilijino Brdo/Bosnia and Herzegovina
M-8	Lipci (M-1) - Grahovo - Vilusi (M-7);
M-9	Vilusi (M-7) - Petrovići - Deleuša/Bosnia and Herzegovina
M-10	Podgorica (M-3) - Cetinje (R-1) - Budva (M-1);
M-11	Lepetani (Ferry to M-1) - Tivat - Krtolska crossroad (M-1);
M-12	Meljine (M-1) - Petijevići - Sitnica/Bosnia and Herzegovina

Future Main road from Cetinje to Nikšić is currently under construction, with section from Cetinje to Čevo expected to be finished until the end of July, 2023.

=== Regional roads ===
This is a list of regional roads in Montenegro.

Designation	Route
R-1	Cetinje (M-10) - Čekanje (R-17) - Krstac (R-25) - Trojica - Kotor (M-1)
R-2	Berane (M-5) - Buča (R-24) - Andrijevica (R-19) - Murino (R-9) - Plav - Gusinje - Grnčar/Albania
R-3	Pljevlja (R-18) - Dajevića Han (R-4) - Metaljka/Bosnia and Herzegovina
R-4	Dajevića Han (R-3) - Čemerno/Serbia
R-5	Rožaje (M-5) - Kula - Stubica/Kosovo
R-6	Most Zeleni (M-5) - Vuča/Serbia
R-7	Vir (M-3) - Krstac/Bosnia and Herzegovina
R-8	Resna (R-17) - Grahovo - Nudo/Bosnia and Herzegovina
R-9	Murino (R-2) - Bjeluha//Kosovo
R-10	Đurđevića Tara (M-6) - Mojkovac (M-2)
R-11	Slijepač Most (M-2) - Tomaševo - Pavino Polje - Trlica (M-6)
R-12	Budimlja (M-5) - Podvade (R-12.1) - Kalače (M-5)
R-12.1	Podvade (R-12.1) - Petnjica
R-13	Bioče (M-2) - Mateševo (R-19) - Kolašin (M-2)
R-14	Danilovgrad (M-3) - Čevo (R-17)
R-15	Vladimir (M-1) - Ostros - Virpazar (R-28 and M-2) - Rijeka Crnojevića - Donji Ulići (M-10)
R-16	Plužine (M-3) - Trsa - Pošćenski kraj (M-6)
R-17	Čekanje (R-1) - Resna (R-8) - Čevo (R-14) - Riđani (M-7)
R-18	Pljevlja (M-6 and R-3) - Gradac - Šula
R-19	Mateševo (R-13) - Andrijevica (R-2)
R-20	Virak (M-6) - Tušina (R-21) - Šavnik (M-6)
R-21	Mioska (M-2) - Semolj - Boan - Tušina (R-20)
R-22	Ulcinj (M-1) - Ada Bojana
R-23	Cerovo (M-3) - Bogetići - Glava Zete - Danilovgrad - Spuž - Vranjske njive
R-24	Buča (R-2) - Lubnice
R-25	Cetinje - Ivanova Korita - Međuvršje (R-25.1) - Krstac (R-1)
R-25.1	Međuvršje (R-25) - Lovćen
R-26	Vrela (M-6) - Njegovuđa
R-27	Cijevna Zatrijebačka/Albania - Dinoša - Podgorica (M-3)
R-28	Bar (M-1) - Virpazar (R-15)
R-29	Bar (M-1) - Kamenički most - Krute (M-1)

== Ports and harbours ==
Port of Bar is the major seaport in Montenegro. It is capable of handling about 5 million tons of cargo, and is a port for ferries to Bari and Ancona in Italy. Kotor, Risan, Tivat and Zelenika (in Bay of Kotor) are smaller ports.

Montenegro's rivers are generally not navigable, except for tourist attractions such as rafting on Tara River.

== See also ==
- Montenegrin car license plates
