= M-1 highway (Montenegro) =

Highway in Montenegro

M-1 highway
- Magistralni put M-1
- Adriatic Highway

Route information
- Part of E-65 / E-80 / E-851
- Length: 163 km (101 mi)
- Existed: 1971–present

Major junctions
- West end: D8 / E65 / E80 in Debeli Brijeg (border with Croatia)

- M-12 in Meljine; M-11 in Kamenari; M-8 in Lipci; R-1 in Kotor; M-11 in Radanovići; M-10 in Budva; M-2 in Petrovac na Moru; M-1.1 / E-65 / E-80 in Sutomore; R-28 in Bar; R-29 in Bar; R-22 in Ulcinj; R-15 in Vladimir

- East end: SH41 in Sukobin (border with Albania)

Location
- Country: Montenegro
- Municipalities: Herceg Novi, Kotor, Budva, Bar, Ulcinj

Highway system
- Transport in Montenegro; Motorways
← A-1	→ M-1.1

M-1 highway (Montenegrin: Magistralni put M-1) is a Montenegrin roadway.

The M-1 highway runs along the complete Montenegrin coast from its western border with Croatia all the way east to border with Albania. It goes through all the coastal cities in Montenegro (i.e. Herceg Novi, Kotor, Budva, Bar, Ulcinj). It is the starting point of all the highways that start at the coastline and go north like M1.1, M-2, M-8 and M12 and intersects with M-11 in Boka Bay, where M-11 can be used to shorten the distance by with using ferryboat from Kamenari to Lepetani. The M-1 highway is part of International E-road network with E-65 / E-80 from border with Croatia to Sutomore and with E-851 going from Sutomore to border with Albania and is Montenegrin part of Adriatic Highway.

== History ==
The M-1 Highway was, from border with Croatia to Petrovac na Moru part of historical M-2 highway in Montenegro. Construction on this highway began in 1953 and finished in 1971. Section from Petrovac na Moru to border with Albania, previously knows as M-2.4 highway was officially opened for traffic in 1973.

In January 2016, the Ministry of Transport and Maritime Affairs published bylaw on categorisation of state roads. With new categorisation, M-1 highway was created, from part of previous M-2 highway, merging with previous M-2.4 Highway.

== Major intersections ==
Municipality	Location	km	mi	Destinations	Notes
Herceg Novi	Debeli Brijeg	0.0	0.0	D8 / E65 / E80 – Dubrovnik (Croatia)	Border crossing with Croatia; Western end of E 65 concurrency Western end of E 80 concurrency
Herceg Novi	Meljine	10.9	6.8	M-12 – Trebinje (Bosnia and Herzegovina)	
Herceg Novi	Kamenari	23.4	14.5	To M-11 – Tivat via Ferryboat to Lepetani	
Kotor	Lipci	29.5	18.3	M-8 – Grahovo, Vilusi	
Kotor	Risan	34.5	21.4	No major intersections	
Kotor	Kotor	53	33	R-1 – Njeguši, Cetinje	
Kotor	Radanovići	56.6	35.2	M-11 – Tivat, Lepetani	near Tivat Airport
Budva	Budva	75.9	47.2	M-10 – Cetinje, Podgorica	
Budva	Petrovac na Moru	91.2	56.7	M-2 / E-851 – Podgorica, Bijelo Polje	Western end of E 851 concurrency
Bar	Sutomore	102.0	63.4	M-1.1 / E-65 / E-80 – Virpazar, Podgorica	via Sozina Tunnel; Eastern end of E 65 concurrency Eastern end of E 80 concurrency
Bar	Bar	113.0	70.2	R-28 – Virpazar	
Bar	Bar	117.6	73.1	R-29 – Krute, Shkodër	
Ulcinj	Ulcinj	138.0	85.7	R-22 – Ada Bojana	
Ulcinj	Vladimir	157.0	97.6	R-15 – Ostros, Virpazar	
Ulcinj	Sukobin	163.0	101.3	SH41 / E851 – Shkodër (Albania)	Border crossing with Albania; Eastern end of E 851 concurrency
1.000 mi = 1.609 km; 1.000 km = 0.621 mi: Concurrency terminus
