= Adriatic Highway =

Coastal road in Southeastern Europe

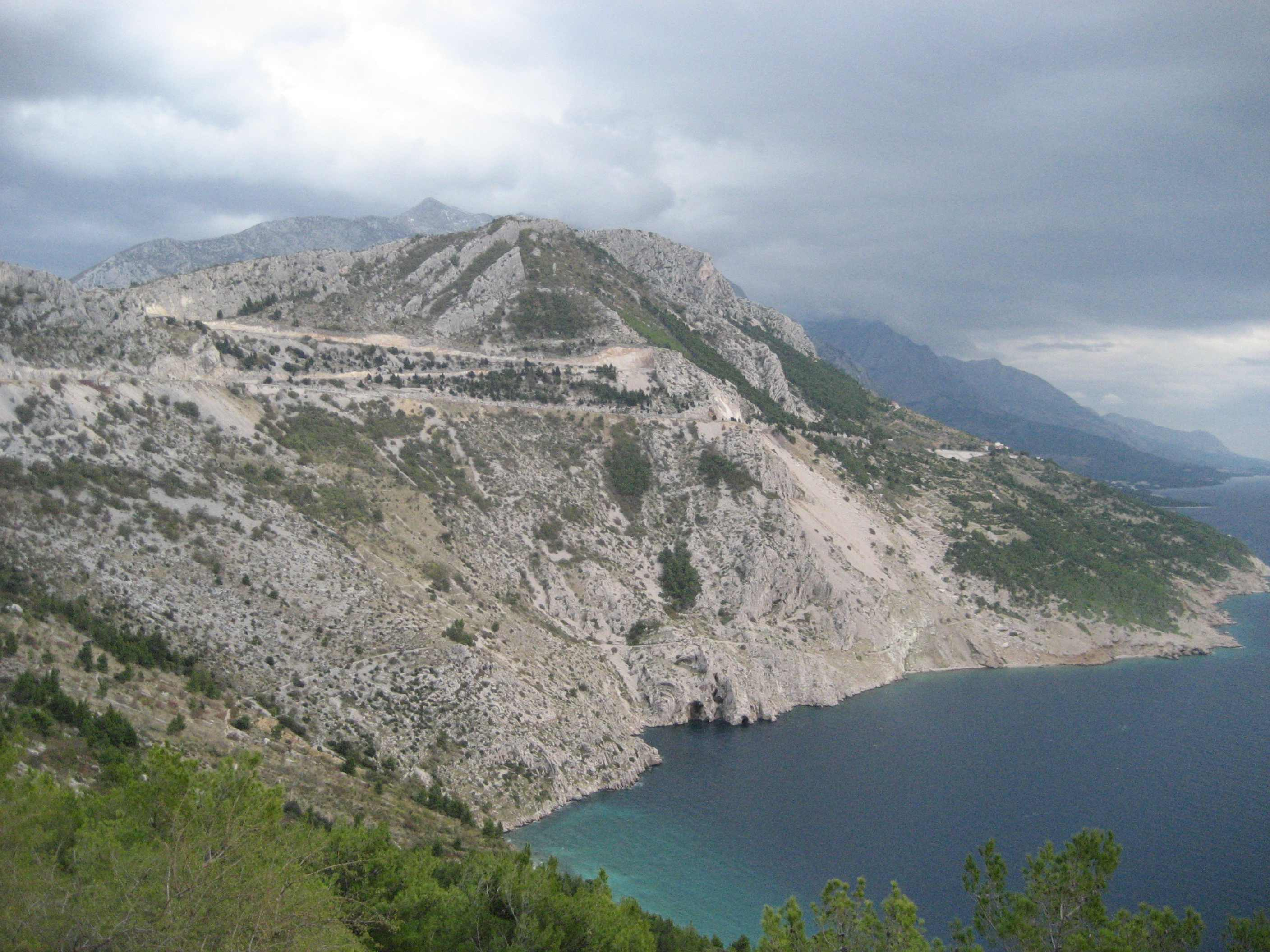
Adriatic Highway near Makarska

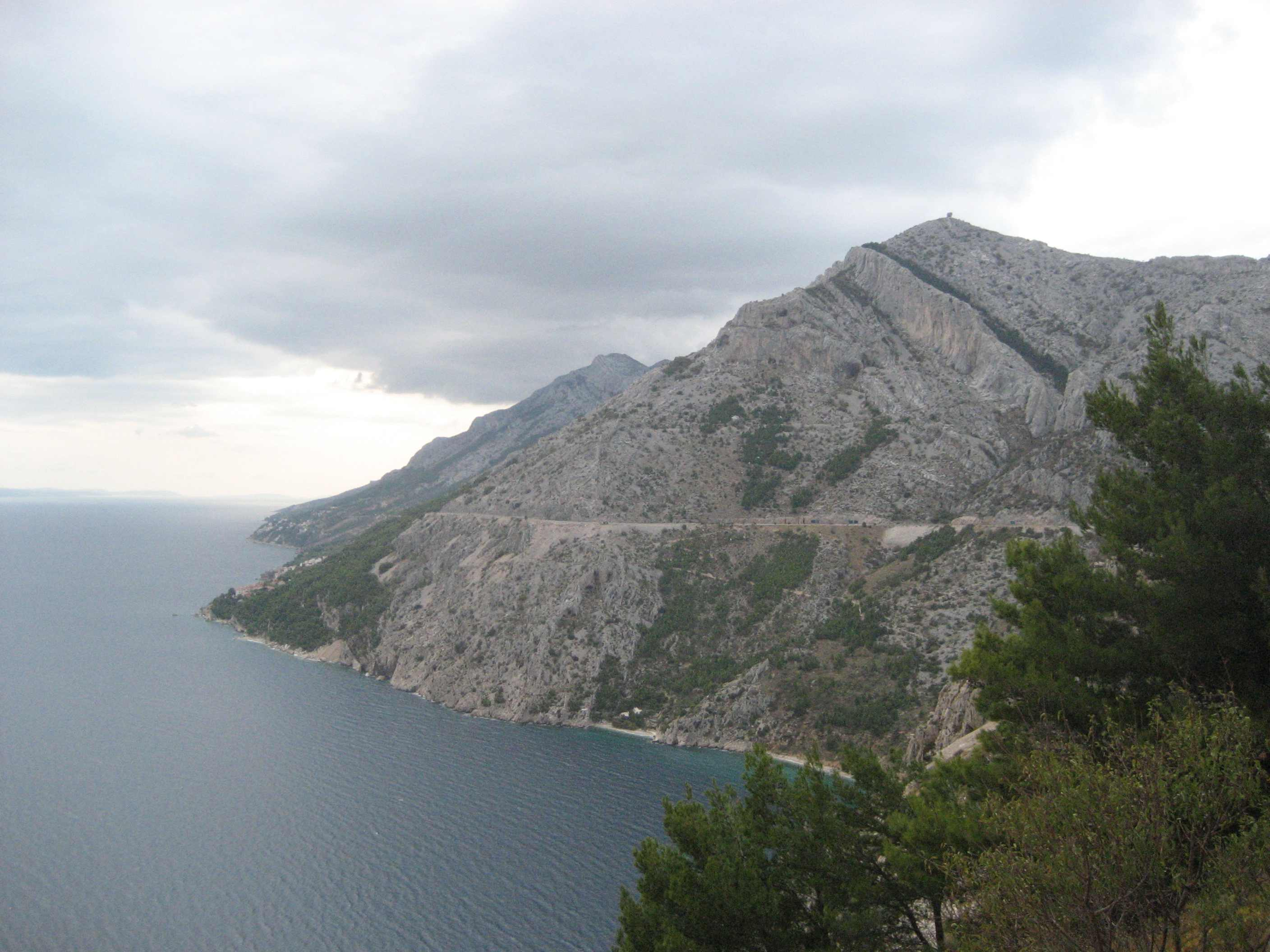
The highway near Tučepi

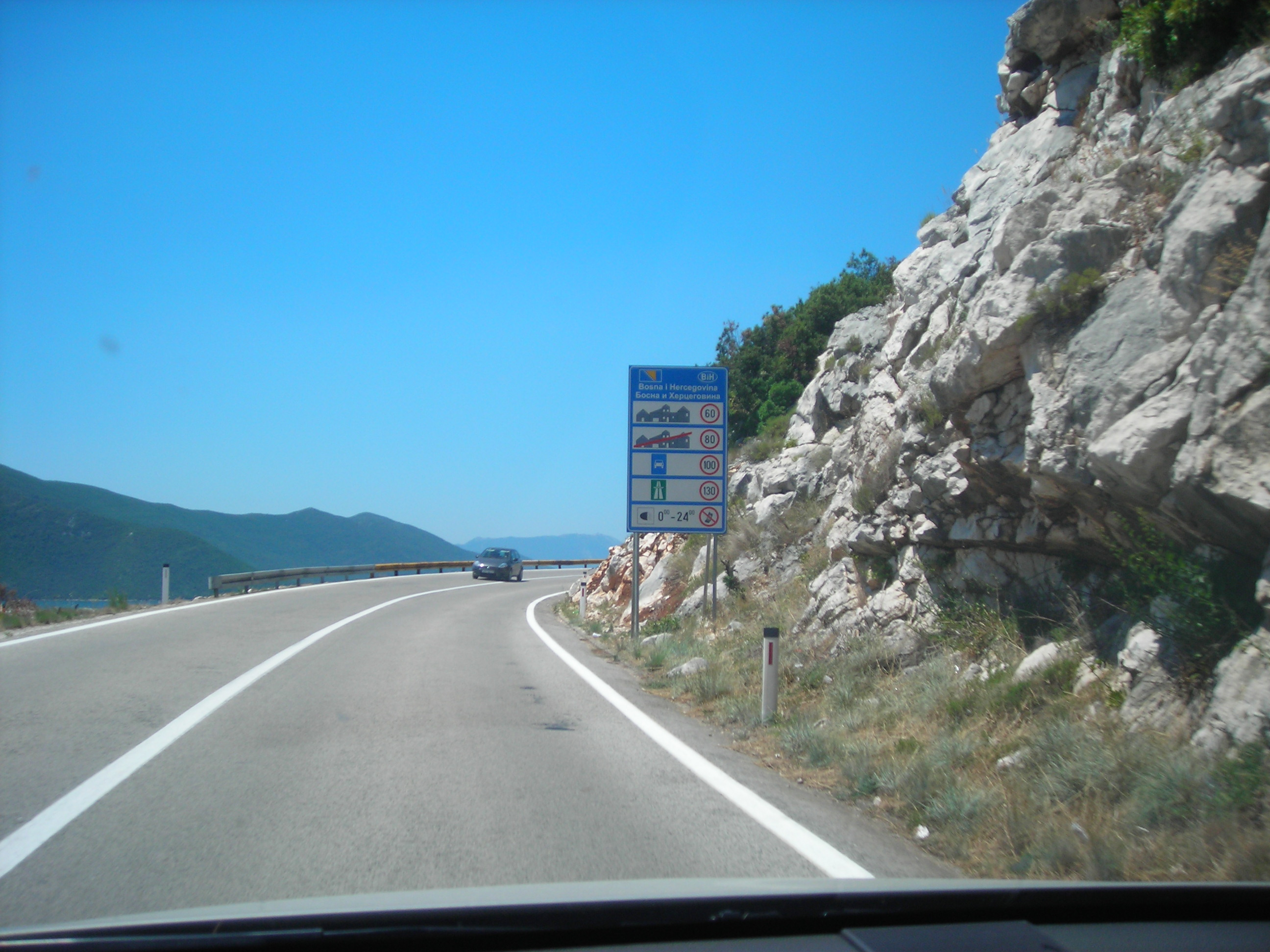
Adriatic Highway south of Neum

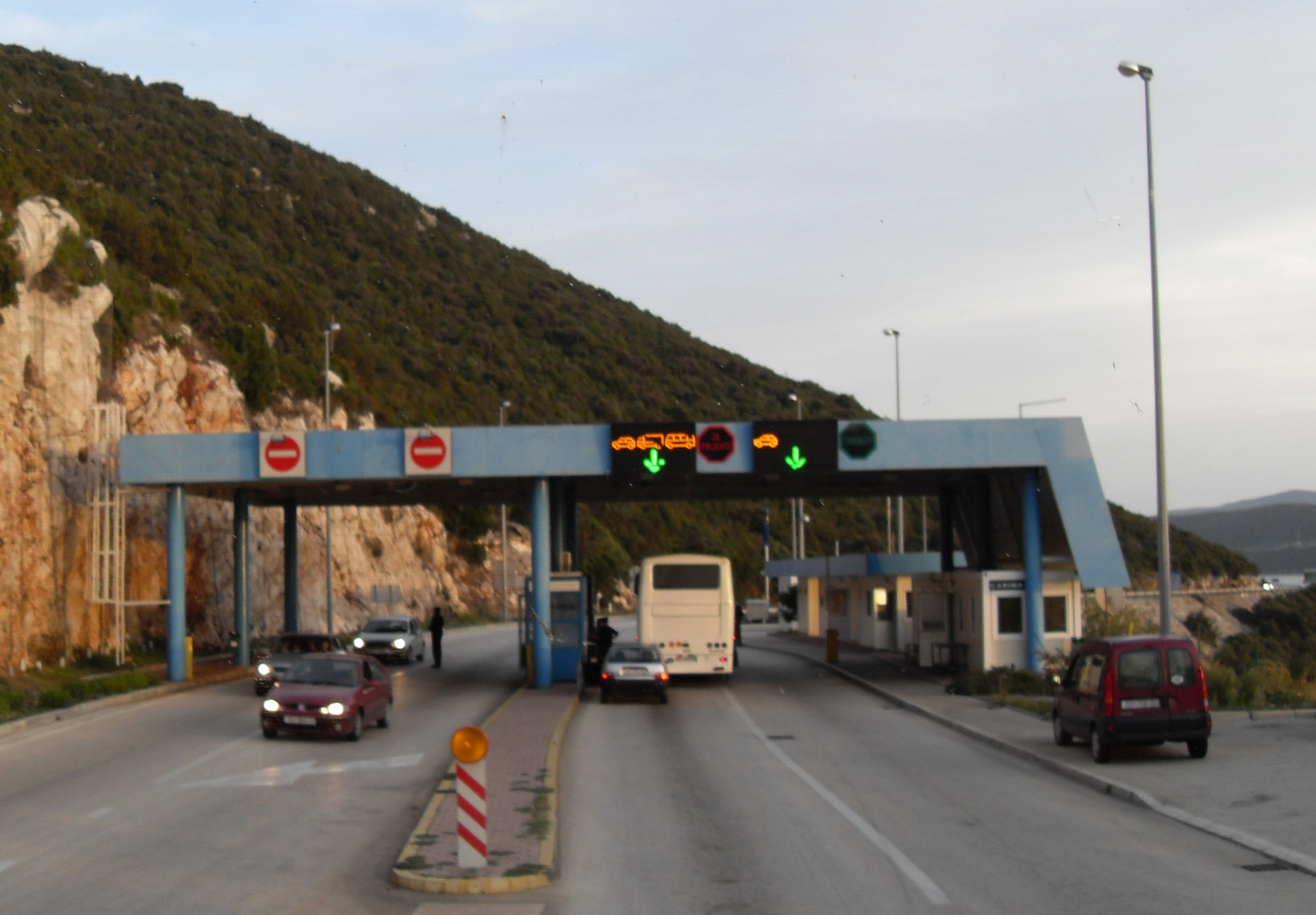
Bosnian border crossing north of Neum

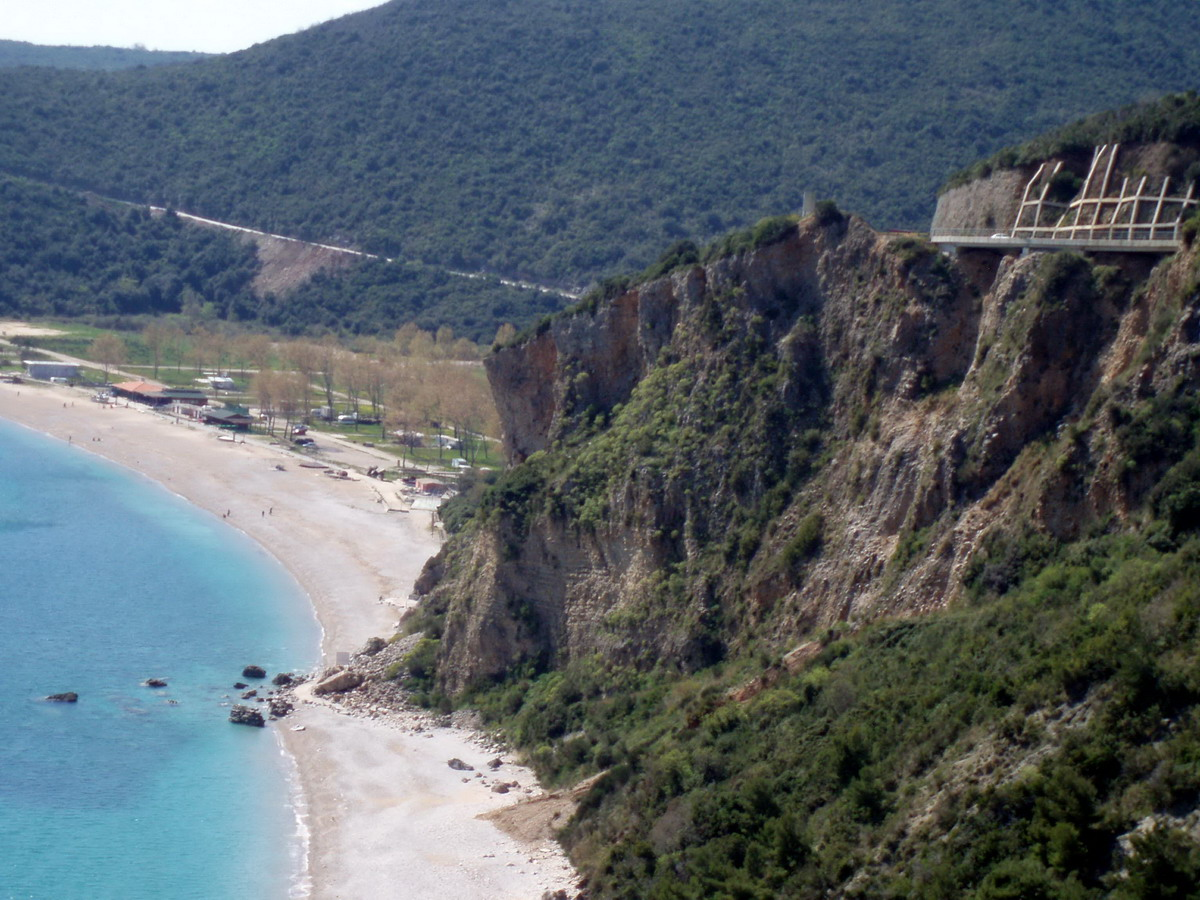
The highway near Jaz Beach, Budva

The Adriatic Highway (Croatian: Jadranska magistrala) is a road that stretches along the eastern coast of the Adriatic Sea and is part of the European route E65. The road passes through Croatia, with smaller stretches through Bosnia and Herzegovina and Montenegro and ends at the Montenegro-Albania border. It is an undivided two-lane road for almost its entire length, with the exception of a short stretch through Zadar and a 24 kilometres (15 mi) dual-carriageway section from Plano (Trogir) to the southeast suburbs of Split. It was planned in the 1930s and built in the 50s and 60s. The dual carriageway is planned to be extended further southeast to Omiš. Completion of the Adriatic Ionian motorway is proposed in order to replace Adriatic Highway as a high-performance road transport route along the Adriatic coast.

== Sections ==
The Adriatic Highway runs along the east coast of the Adriatic Sea, passing through three countries: Croatia, Bosnia and Herzegovina and Montenegro. Most of the highway is located in Croatia.

=== Croatian section ===
The Croatian section of the Adriatic Highway is officially named the D8 state road (Croatian: Državna cesta D8), which runs from the Slovenian border crossing at Pasjak via Rijeka, Senj, Zadar, Šibenik, Split, Opuzen and Dubrovnik to the border with Montenegro at Karasovići. Most of the D8 is still a two-lane road, with four-lane stretches being relatively rare. The total length of the road through Croatia is 643.1 kilometres (399.6 mi). Like all other state roads in Croatia, it is maintained by the state-owned Hrvatske ceste.

Until recent times the highway has been the primary route connecting Adriatic coastal parts of Croatia. Since the 2000s multilane motorways have taken over most of its traffic, and yet more motorways are still being built along the coast. The motorways parallel to the road are the A7 (Rupa border crossing-Sveti Kuzam), A6 (Rijeka-Bosiljevo) and A1 (Bosiljevo-Zadar-Split-Ploče). Since the Adriatic Highway closely follows the well-indented Croatian coastline, travel is considerably slower and less safe when compared to the motorways because of numerous blind curves and at-grade intersections. However, the D8 state road is still popular as an alternative to the tolled highways, so the road carries fairly constant traffic during most of the year. The traffic intensifies in the summer, because of substantial traffic to tourist destinations.

The D8 section from Rijeka to Senj experiences particularly heavy traffic in particular because many motorists are unwilling to take the longer route via the A6 and A1, even though the motorway route normally requires shorter travel time. Before 2009, this problem would be further exacerbated as the A6 still had some slow semi-highway sections between Rijeka and Bosiljevo. This section will likely remain congested at peak times until the completion of the A7 motorway between Kraljevica and Žuta Lokva.

Since the parallel A1 motorway terminates at the Ploče interchange, approximately 20 km (10 mi) northwest of Ploče, tourists heading south generally switch to the Adriatic Highway. Further 30 km (20 mi) after Ploče drivers also encounter a small strip of Bosnia and Herzegovina territory around town of (Neum) between Klek and Zaton Doli. After that section, the highway continues to Dubrovnik close to the coastline.

Upon the completion of A7 and A1 the part of Adriatic Highway spanning from Ploče to Dubrovnik are planned to be upgraded to an expressway bypassing Neum in Bosnia and Herzegovina entirely via a series of tunnels and bridges, Pelješac Bridge being the most notable among them. The possibility of other upgrades remains open.

East of Dubrovnik the road passes by Dubrovnik Airport and reaches the border with Montenegro at Karasovići (Debeli Brijeg on the Montenegrin side).

=== Bosnia and Herzegovina section ===
The highway passes through a small strip of Bosnia and Herzegovina territory at Neum and is classified as M-2 road (Bosnian: Magistralna cesta M-2). The border crossings are at Neum 1 (with Klek on the Croatian side) to the west of Neum, and Neum 2 (with Zaton Doli on the Croatian side) to the east.

=== Montenegrin section ===
Within Montenegro, the road is official classified as the M-1 highway (Montenegrin: Magistralni put M-1), and runs from Debeli Brijeg border crossing with Croatia through Herceg Novi, Kotor, Budva, Petrovac, Sutomore, Bar and Ulcinj, before ending at the Sukobin border crossing with Albania, having two lanes for its entire length.

The road itself runs around the Bay of Kotor through Kotor, but through traffic uses the ferry connection across the Verige Strait between Herceg Novi and Tivat via the M-11 road. The Verige bridge, to span the eponymous strait, is planned to allow traffic to bypass most of the bay.

The Montenegrin section, albeit as narrow as the Croatian section, still remains the only feasible route along the Adriatic coast. As yet, there are no plans for any motorways along the coast of Montenegro to replace it.

There are three major roads from the Adriatic Highway to inland Montenegro – at Budva, via M-10 to Cetinje, at Petrovac, via M-2 to Virpazar and Podgorica, and at Sutomore, via the Sozina Tunnel (M-1.1), also to Virpazar and Podgorica.

The road is the part of E65 and E80 European routes starting from Debeli Brijeg border crossing, and the European route E851 starting from Petrovac. At Sutomore, the E65 and E80 routes go to the north and leave the road via the Sozina Tunnel, while the E851 continues on the M-1 to Sukobin border crossing.
