= M-2 highway (Montenegro) =

Highway in Montenegro

M-2 highway
- Magistralni put M-2

Route information
- Part of E-65 / E-80 / E-763
- Length: 187 km (116 mi)
- Existed: 1971–present

Major junctions
- South end: M-1 / E-65 / E-80 in Petrovac na Moru

- M-1.1 in Virpazar; R-15 in Virpazar; M-3 / E-762 in Podgorica; M-4 / E-762 in Podgorica; R-27 in Podgorica; A-1 in Podgorica; R-13 in Bioče; R-21 in Mioska; R-13 in Kolašin; R-10 in Mojkovac; R-11 in Slijepač Most; M-5 / E-65 / E-80 in Ribarevine

- North end: 23 / E763 in Barski Most (border with Serbia)

Location
- Country: Montenegro
- Municipalities: Budva, Bar, Podgorica, Kolašin, Mojkovac, Bijelo Polje

Highway system
- Transport in Montenegro; Motorways
← M-1.1	→ M-3

The M-2 highway (Montenegrin: Magistralni put M-2) is a Montenegrin roadway.

The M-2 highway is the oldest and most important connection between the coastal region and the North of Montenegro. It goes from Petrovac na Moru in Budva Municipality, through the capital city of Podgorica, and the towns of Kolašin and Mojkovac, to the border of Serbia north of Bijelo Polje. In 2016, the highway was shortened, and its route changed. The road is considered to be the "backbone of the Montenegrin road network".

Most notorious part of this road is Platije Canyon, where more than 1200 people have lost their lives. Part of the Bar-Boljare motorway that was built from 2015 to 2022 is a new and safe connection between Podgorica and Kolašin avoiding Platije Canyon.

== History ==
Construction of the historical M-2 highway began in 1953. Construction finished in 1971.

Part of M-2 highway, which was known as M-21 highway before January 2016, flowed through the center of the city of Bijelo Polje and caused heavy traffic delays. As a means to alleviate traffic in the city, the Montenegrin Ministry of Transport and Maritime Affairs commissioned a project to create a bypass around the city. As a result, on 27 March 2014, the Ministry of Transport and Maritime Affairs officially realigned the then M-21 highway to the current alignment. The M-21 highway would now run along the bypass, no longer running through the city center.

In January 2016, the Ministry of Transport and Maritime Affairs published bylaw on the categorisation of state roads. With this new categorisation, M-2 highway was no longer following the coastal road, from the border with Croatia to Petrovac na Moru, which is now part of the newly established M-1 highway. In northern Montenegro, the M-2 was realigned from Ribarevine now going north via Bijelo Polje to the border with Serbia, instead of going via Berane and Rožaje to the border with Serbia, which is now the newly established M-5 highway.

== Major intersections ==
Municipality	Location	km	mi	Destinations	Notes
Budva	Petrovac na Moru	0.0	0.0	M-1 / E-65 / E-80 – Budva, Bar	
Bar	Virpazar	23.3	14.5	M-1.1 / E-65 / E-80 – Bar	via Sozina Tunnel; Southern end of E 65 concurrency Southern end of E 80 concurrency
Bar	Virpazar	24.8	15.4	R-15 – Ostros, Vladimir	
Bridge over Lake Skadar		28.7	17.8		
Podgorica	Golubovci	45.3	28.1	Podgorica Airport	
Podgorica	Podgorica – Zabjelo	51.9	32.2	M-3 / E-762 – Nikšić	Western end of E 762 concurrency
Podgorica	Podgorica – Stari Aerodrom	53.5	33.2	M-4 / E-762 – Tuzi	Eastern end of E 762 concurrency
Podgorica	Podgorica – Stari Aerodrom	54.9	34.1	R-27 – Gusinje, Plav	
Podgorica	Podgorica – Zlatica	59.4	36.9	A-1 – Kolašin, Belgrade	
Podgorica	Bioče	67	42	R-13 – Mateševo, Andrijevica	
Kolašin	Mioska	107	66	R-21 – Boan, Šavnik	
Kolašin	Kolašin	122	76	R-13 – Mateševo, Andrijevica	
Mojkovac	Mojkovac	144	89	R-10 – Đurđevića Tara, Pljevlja, Žabljak	
Bijelo Polje	Slijepač Most	161	100	R-11 – Tomaševo, Pljevlja	
Bijelo Polje	Ribarevine	167	104	M-5 / E-65 / E-80 – Berane, Rožaje	Northern end of E 65 concurrency Northern end of E 80 concurrency Southern end of E 763 concurrency
Bijelo Polje	Bijelo Polje	171	106	No major intersection, bypass east of the city	
Bijelo Polje	Barski Most	187	116	23 / E763 – Prijepolje (Serbia)	Border crossing with Serbia; Northern end of E 763 concurrency
1.000 mi = 1.609 km; 1.000 km = 0.621 mi: Concurrency terminus
