= R-28 regional road (Montenegro) =

Road in Montenegro

R-28 regional road
- Regionalni put R-28

Route information
- Length: 37.8 km (23.5 mi)

Major junctions
- South end: M-1 in Bar
- North end: R-15 in Virpazar

Location
- Country: Montenegro
- Municipalities: Bar

Highway system
- Transport in Montenegro; Motorways
← R-27	→ R-29

R-28 regional road (Montenegrin: Regionalni put R-28) is a Montenegrin roadway.

== History ==
R-28 regional road was first built as a Bar - Virpazar railroad. Construction on this railway started in 1905. In 1959, all operations on this railway stopped, after which it was adapted for road transport.

In November 2019, the Government of Montenegro published bylaw on categorisation of state roads. With new categorisation, R-28 regional road was created from municipal road.

== Major intersections ==
Municipality	Location	km	mi	Destinations	Notes
Bar	Bar	0.0	0.0	M-1 – Budva, Ulcinj	
Bar	Virpazar	37.8	23.5	R-15 – Podgorica, Bar	
1.000 mi = 1.609 km; 1.000 km = 0.621 mi
