= M-12 highway (Montenegro) =

Road in Montenegro

M-12 highway
- Magistralni put M-12

Route information
- Length: 18.9 km (11.7 mi)

Major junctions
- South end: M-1 in Meljine
- North end: R-I-6104 in Sitnica/Podštirovnik

Location
- Country: Montenegro
- Municipalities: Herceg Novi

Highway system
- Transport in Montenegro; Motorways
← M-11	→ R-1

M-12 highway (Montenegrin: Magistralni put M-12) is a Montenegrin roadway.

== History ==
In January 2016, the Ministry of Transport and Maritime Affairs published bylaw on categorisation of state roads. With new categorisation, this road was categorised as M-12 highway.

== Major intersections ==
Municipality	Location	km	mi	Destinations	Notes
Herceg Novi	Meljine	0.0	0.0	M-1 – Herceg Novi, Kotor	
Herceg Novi	Sitnica	18.9	11.7	R-I-6104 Trebinje (RS, Bosnia and Herzegovina)	border crossing with Bosnia and Herzegovina
1.000 mi = 1.609 km; 1.000 km = 0.621 mi
