= R-29 regional road (Montenegro) =

Road in Montenegro

R-29 regional road
- Regionalni put R-29

Route information
- Length: 14.3 km (8.9 mi)

Major junctions
- West end: M-1 in Bar
- West end: M-1 in Krute

Location
- Country: Montenegro
- Municipalities: Bar, Ulcinj

Highway system
- Transport in Montenegro; Motorways
← R-28	→ A-1

R-29 regional road (Montenegrin: Regionalni put R-29) is a Montenegrin roadway.

== History ==
In November 2019, the Government of Montenegro published bylaw on categorisation of state roads. With new categorisation, R-29 regional road was created from municipal road.

== Major intersections ==
Municipality	Location	km	mi	Destinations	Notes
Bar	Bar	0.0	0.0	M-1 – Budva, Ulcinj	
Ulcinj	Krute	14.3	8.9	M-1 – Ulcinj	
1.000 mi = 1.609 km; 1.000 km = 0.621 mi
