= R29 =

R29 or R-29 may refer to:

== Roads ==
- R-29 regional road (Montenegro)
- R29 (South Africa)

== Other uses ==
- R29 (New York City Subway car)
- AEKKEA-RAAB R-29, a Greek fighter aircraft
- HMA R.29, an airship of the Royal Air Force
- HMS Charity (R29), a destroyer of the Royal Navy
- R29: Contact with water liberates toxic gas, a risk phrase
- R-29 Vysota, a family of Soviet submarine-launched ballistic missiles
- Refinery29, an American entertainment website
- Renault R29, a Formula One racing car
- Tumansky R-29, a Soviet turbojet engine
