= R-1 regional road (Montenegro) =

Road in Montenegro

R-1 regional road
- Regionalni put R-1

Route information
- Length: 36.3 km (22.6 mi)
- Existed: 1881–present

Major junctions
- East end: M-10 in Cetinje

- R-17 in Čekanje; R-25 in Krstac

- West end: M-1 / E-65 / E-80 in Kotor

Location
- Country: Montenegro
- Municipalities: Cetinje, Kotor

Highway system
- Transport in Montenegro; Motorways
← M-12	→ R-2

R-1 regional road (Montenegrin: Regionalni put R-1) is a Montenegrin roadway.

Between Čekanje and Njeguši there used to be 7 hairpin turns, but after the tunnel was excavated in 2018, only 3 are still on this route. After Krstac, going down the western mountainside of Lovćen towards Kotor, there are an additional 25 hairpin turns.

== History ==
The section of the R-1 regional road between Cetinje and Krstac (Njeguši) is the oldest vehicular road in Montenegro. It was built after Montenegro was recognised as an independent state at Congress of Berlin in 1878. Construction begin in 1879, and was finished in 1881

The reconstruction of the road between Bajice (village at the outskirts of Cetinje) and Krstac took place in 2017 and 2018. The road was widened from 4 meters to 6.6 meters and the radius of curves was increased. Between Čekanje and Njeguši a 490 meters tunnel was excavated, bypassing hairpin turns. All of this shortened the road for 3.5 km and at the same time increased the speed.

== Major intersections ==
Municipality	Location	km	mi	Destinations	Notes
Cetinje	Cetinje	0.0	0.0	M-10 – Podgorica, Budva	
Cetinje	Cetinje	2.4	1.5		Road R-25 is 500 m away.
Cetinje	Čekanje	11.6	7.2	R-17 – Čevo, Nikšić	
Cetinje	Njeguši	17	11	No major intersection	
Cetinje	Krstac	20.1	12.5	R-25	This road goes through Lovćen National Park and to Mausoleum of Njegoš
Kotor	Kotor	40	25	M-1 / E-65 / E-80 – Kotor, Tivat, Budva	
1.000 mi = 1.609 km; 1.000 km = 0.621 mi

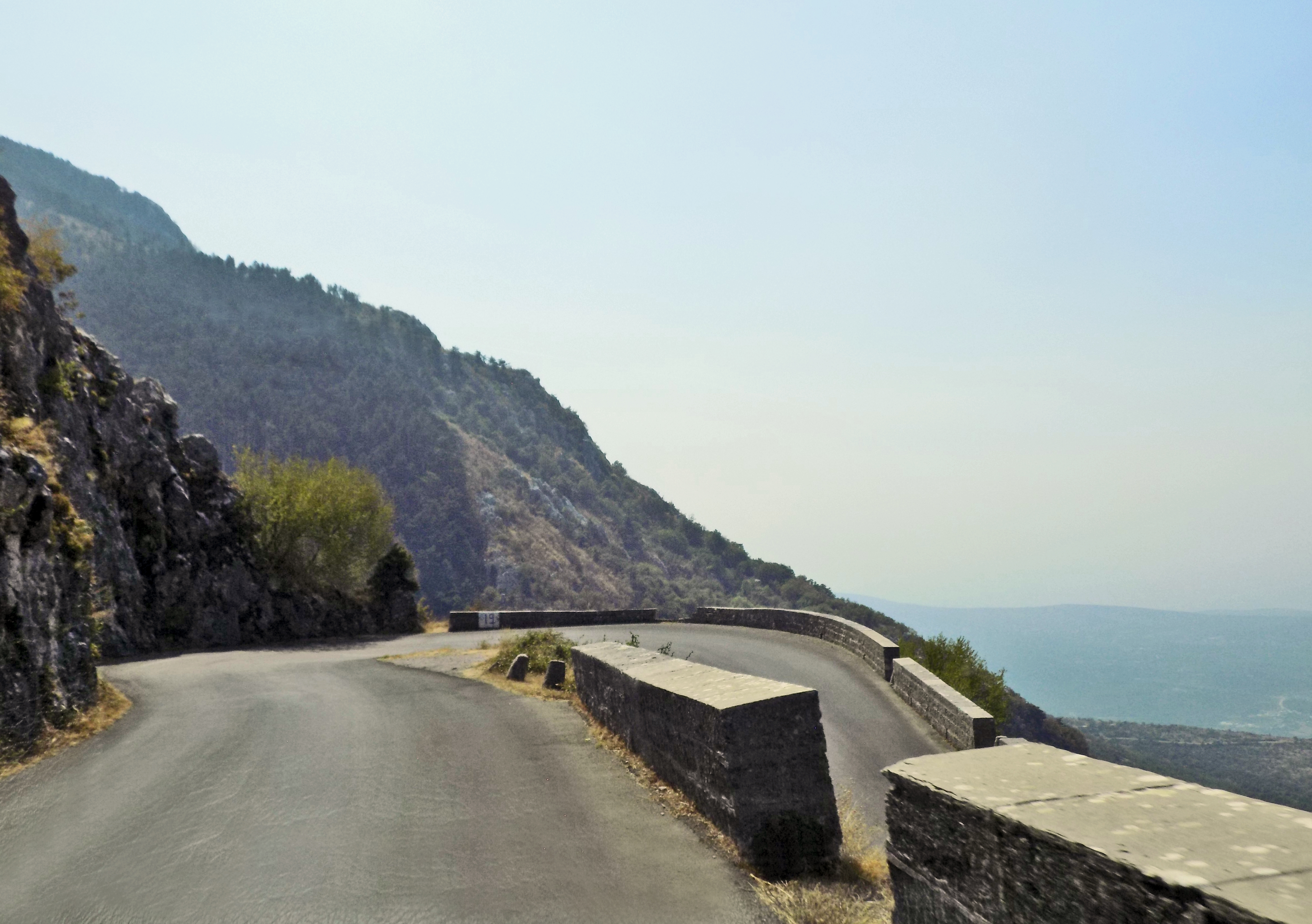
One of 23 hairpin turns

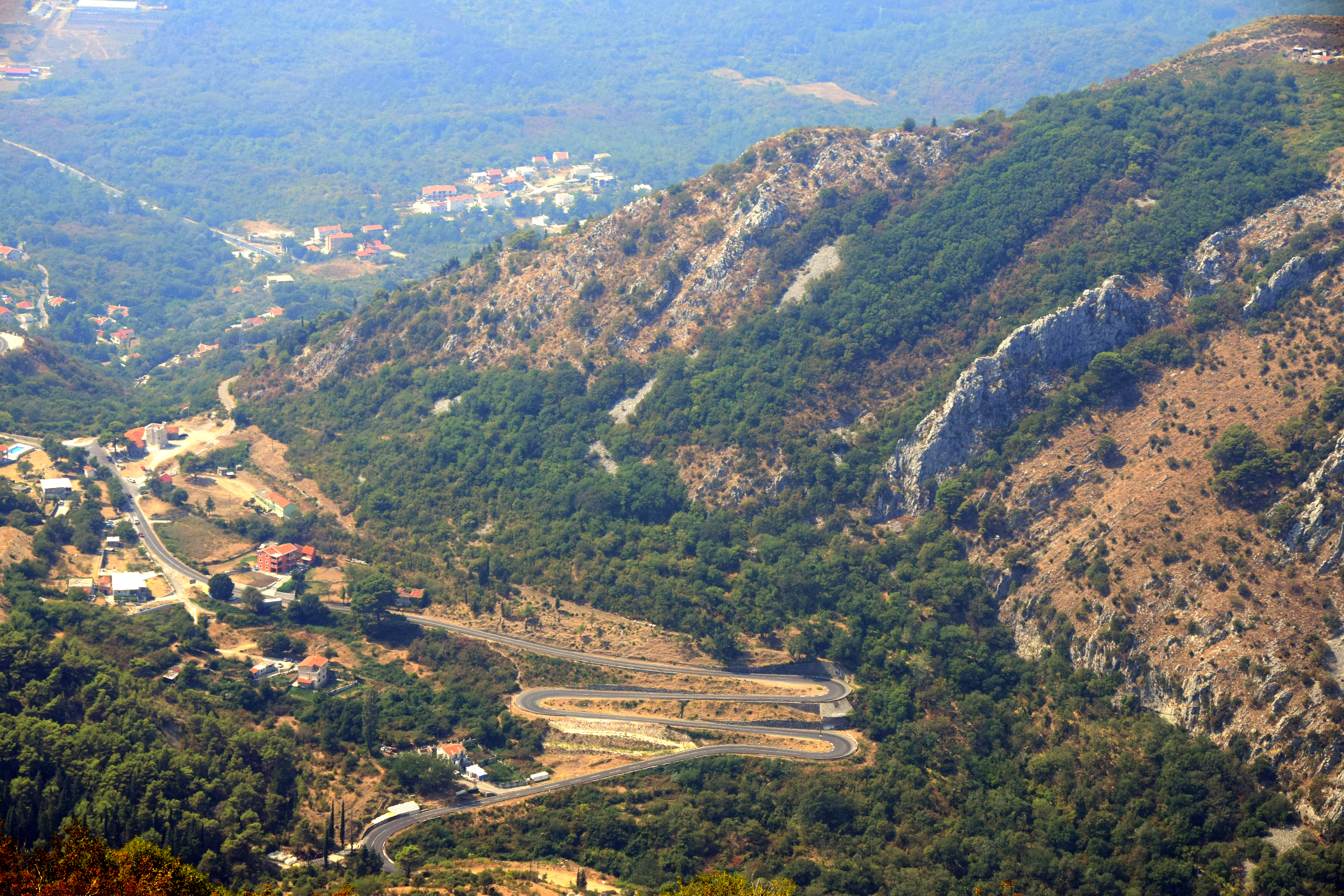
Hairpin turns near Kotor

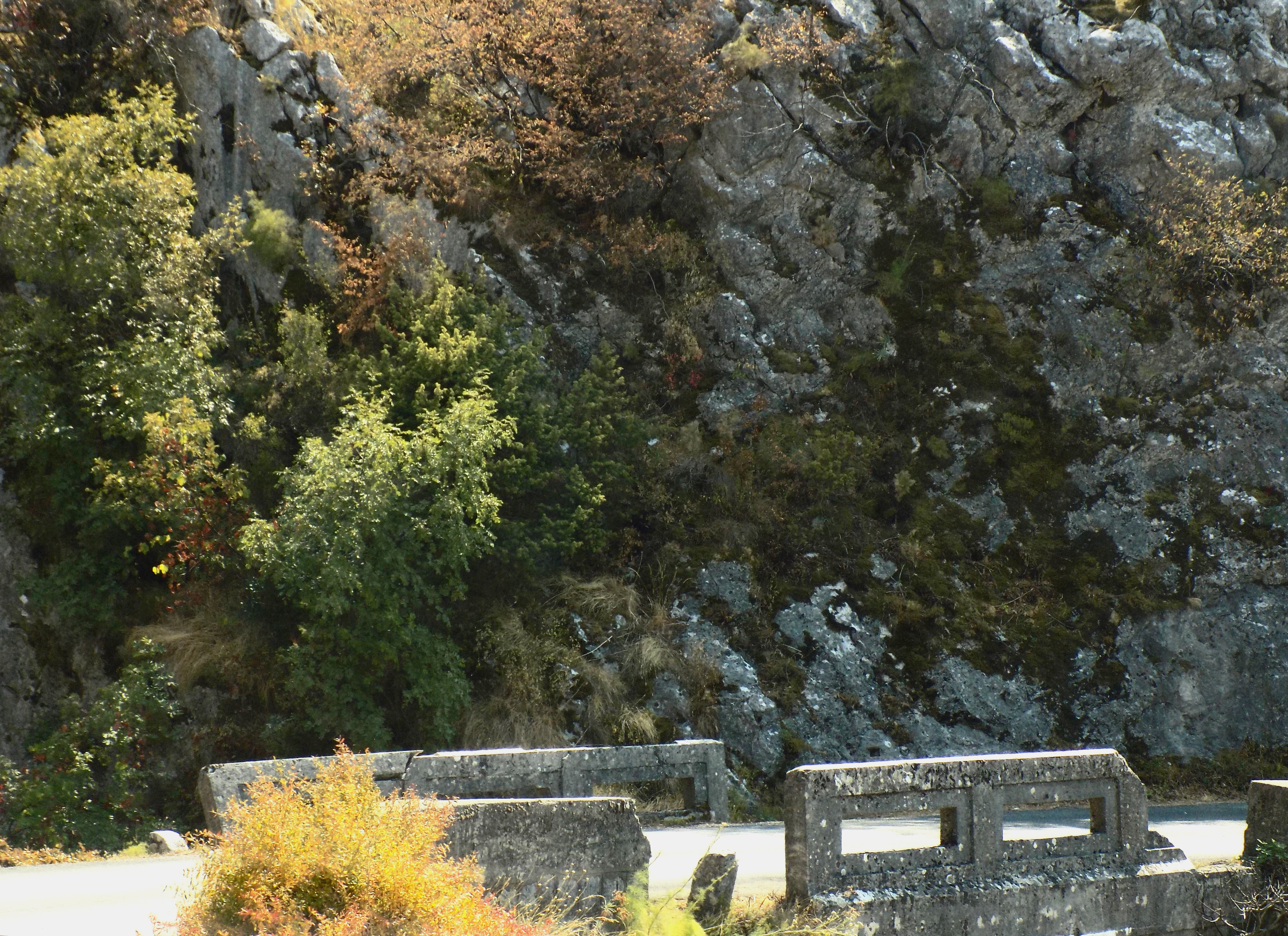
Old bridge on the road

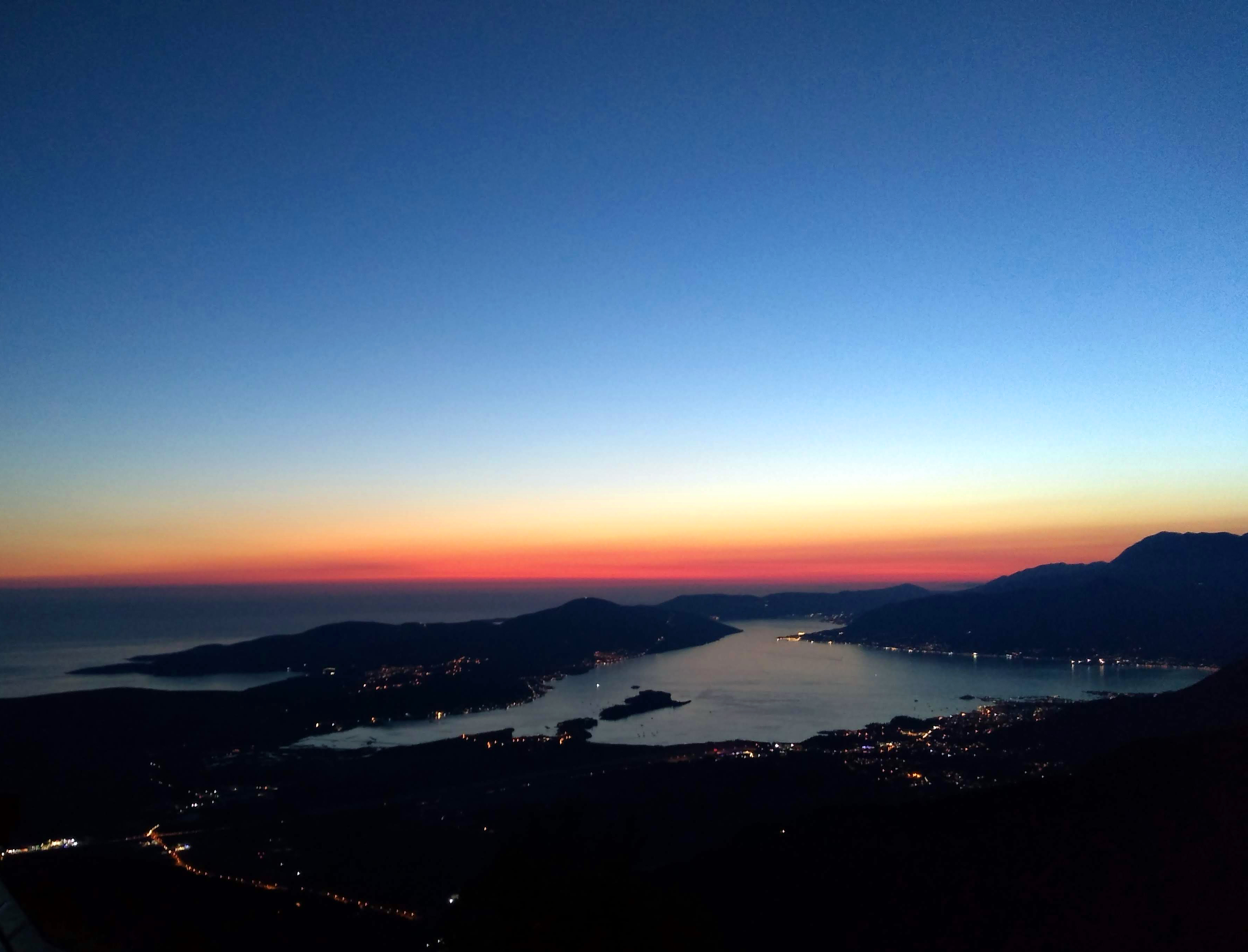
Night view from the road to the Bay of Kotor
