= R-15 regional road (Montenegro) =

Road in Montenegro

R-15 regional road
- Regionalni put R-15

Route information
- Length: 51.3 km (31.9 mi)

Major junctions
- North end: M-2 in Virpazar
- South end: M-1 in Vladimir

Location
- Country: Montenegro
- Municipalities: Bar, Ulcinj

Highway system
- Transport in Montenegro; Motorways
| ← R-14 | → R-16 |

R-15 regional road (Montenegrin: Regionalni put R-15) (previously known as R-16 regional road) is a Montenegrin roadway.

== History ==
In January 2016, the Ministry of Transport and Maritime Affairs published a bylaw on categorisation of state roads. With new categorisation, R-16 regional road was renamed as R-15 regional road.

== Major intersections ==
| Municipality | Location | km | mi | Destinations | Notes |
|---|---|---|---|---|---|
| Bar | Virpazar | 0.0 | 0.0 | M-2 – Podgorica, Bar | |
| Bar | Ostros | 34.3 | 21.3 | No major intersection | |
| Ulcinj | Vladimir | 51.3 | 31.9 | M-1 – Ulcinj, Bar | |
1.000 mi = 1.609 km; 1.000 km = 0.621 mi
