= M-11 highway (Montenegro) =

Highway in Montenegro

M-11 highway
- Magistralni put M-11

Route information
- Length: 10.1 km (6.3 mi)
- Existed: 1971–present

Major junctions
- North end: Kamenari–Lepetani Ferry in Lepetani
- South end: M-1 / E-65 / E-80 in Radanovići

Location
- Country: Montenegro
- Municipalities: Tivat

Highway system
- Transport in Montenegro; Motorways
← M-10	→ M-12

M-11 highway (Montenegrin: Magistralni put M-11) (previously known as M-2.1) is a Montenegrin roadway.

The M-11 highway serves as an extension of the M-1 highway, serving Tivat and Tivat Airport. When used with Ferryboat to Kamenari it also serves as a shortcut for M-1 highway bypassing much of bay of Kotor.

It is the shortest highway in Montenegro.

== History ==
Before Vrmac Tunnel was built, M-11 highway was part of M-2 highway, which itself was part of Adriatic highway also serving as part of E-65 / E-80 International E-roads. On 27 March 2014, the Ministry of Transport and Maritime Affairs realigned the M-2 highway. Regional road R-22 was declared defunct and its route integrated into the M-2. As a result of the realignment, the M-2 no longer served the Tivat Municipality. Instead, the Vrmac Peninsula (and thus the Tivat Municipality) was bypassed via the Vrmac Tunnel, connecting Radanovići to Kotor. The pre-realignment route from Radanovići and Lepetani (Ferryboat) was reassigned as the M-2.1 highway, while the remaining route between Lepetani and Škaljari was downgraded to a municipal road.

In January 2016, the Ministry of Transport and Maritime Affairs published bylaw on categorisation of state roads. With new categorisation, M-11 highway was created from previous M-2.1 highway.

== Major intersections ==
Municipality	Location	km	mi	Destinations	Notes
Tivat	Lepetani	0.0	0.0	To M-1 / E-65 / E-80 via Ferryboat to Kamenari	
Tivat	Tivat	4.5	2.8	No major intersections	
Tivat	Tivat Airport	7.3	4.5	Exit for Tivat Airport	
Kotor	Radanovići	10.1	6.3	M-1 / E-65 / E-80 – Kotor, Budva	
1.000 mi = 1.609 km; 1.000 km = 0.621 mi
