= R22 =

R22 may refer to:

== Roads ==
- R22 road (Belgium)
- R-22 regional road (Montenegro)
- R22 highway (Russia)
- R22 (South Africa)

== Vessels ==
- HMS Ursa (R22), a destroyer of the Royal Navy
- INS Viraat (R22), an aircraft carrier of the Indian Navy
- USS R-22 (SS-99), a submarine of the United States Navy
- Yugoslav destroyer Pula

== Other uses ==
- R22 (New York City Subway car)
- Chlorodifluoromethane, a refrigerant
- Fiat R.22, an Italian reconnaissance aircraft
- Ndonga dialect
- R22: Harmful if swallowed, a risk phrase
- R-22 Spearhead, a fictional starfighter in the Star Wars universe
- Robinson R22, an American helicopter
- R22 refrigerant
