= M-1.1 highway (Montenegro) =

Highway in Montenegro

M-1.1 highway
- Magistralni put M-1.1

Route information
- Length: 12 km (7.5 mi)
- Existed: 2005–present

Major junctions
- South end: M-1 / E-65 / E-80 / E-851 in Sutomore

- North end: M-2 / E-65 / E-80 in Virpazar

Location
- Country: Montenegro
- Municipalities: Bar

Highway system
- Transport in Montenegro; Motorways
← M-1	→ M-2

M-1.1 highway (Montenegrin: Magistralni put M-1.1) is a Montenegrin roadway.

The M-1.1 highway is built to half of motorway standard. It is planned to become part of the Bar-Boljare motorway. The main part of this highway is the Sozina tunnel, which is 4,189 m long. It serves as bypass of the mountain range Paštrovska Gora that separates the Montenegrin coast from the Zeta plain and Skadar Lake basin. The distance between Podgorica, the capital of Montenegro, and Bar's main port is shortened by approximately 25km. The M-1.1 highway is also part of the E-65 / E-80 International E-roads.

== History ==
Sozina tunnel was opened on 13 July 2005, which was also the day when this road was opened. In January 2016, the Ministry of Transport and Maritime Affairs published a bylaw on categorisation of state roads categorising this road as M-1.1.

== Major intersections ==
Municipality	Location	km	mi	Destinations	Notes
Bar	Sutomore	0.0	0.0	M-1 / E-65 / E-80 / E-851 – Budva, Ulcinj	via Sozina Tunnel; Southern end of E 65 concurrency Southern end of E 80 concurrency
Bar	Virpazar	12	7.5	M-2 / E-65 / E-80	Northern end of E 65 concurrency Northern end of E 80 concurrency
1.000 mi = 1.609 km; 1.000 km = 0.621 mi: Concurrency terminus
