= R-25 regional road (Montenegro) =

Road in Montenegro

R-25 regional road
- Regionalni put R-25

Route information
- Length: 25.5 km (15.8 mi)

Major junctions
- East end: Cetinje
- West end: R-1 in Krstac

Location
- Country: Montenegro
- Municipalities: Cetinje

Highway system
- Transport in Montenegro; Motorways
← R-24	→ R-25.1

R-25 regional road (Montenegrin: Regionalni put R-25) is a Montenegrin roadway.

== History ==
Part of the road between Krstac and Međuvršje was reconstructed in 2019.

In November 2019, the Government of Montenegro published bylaw on categorisation of state roads. With new categorisation, R-25 regional road was created from municipal road.

== Major intersections ==
Municipality	Location	km	mi	Destinations	Notes
Cetinje	Cetinje	0.0	0.0		R-1 is 500 m away.
Cetinje	Ivanova korita	13	8.1	No major intersection	
Cetinje	Međuvršje	17	11	R-25.1	R-25.1 leads to Lovćen mountain
Cetinje	Krstac	25.5	15.8	R-1 – Cetinje, Kotor	
1.000 mi = 1.609 km; 1.000 km = 0.621 mi
