= R-27 regional road (Montenegro) =

Road in Montenegro

R-27 regional road
- Regionalni put R-27

Route information
- Length: 24 km (15 mi)

Major junctions
- East end: Cijevna Zatrebačka
- West end: M-3 in Podgorica

Location
- Country: Montenegro
- Municipalities: Podgorica, Tuzi

Highway system
- Transport in Montenegro; Motorways
← R-26	→ R-28

R-27 regional road (Montenegrin: Regionalni put R-27) is a Montenegrin roadway.

Part of the road between Dinoša and Cijevna Zatrebačka is under reconstruction. Deadline for the reconstruction is July 2020.

== History ==
In November 2019, the Government of Montenegro published bylaw on categorisation of state roads. With new categorisation, R-27 regional road was created from municipal road.

== Major intersections ==
Municipality	Location	km	mi	Destinations	Notes
Tuzi	Cijevna Zatrebačka	0.0	0.0	SH20 – Shkodër (Albania)	
Tuzi	Dinoša	18	11	No major intersection	
Podgorica	Podgorica	24	15	M-3 – Kolašin, Nikšić, Cetinje, Bar	
1.000 mi = 1.609 km; 1.000 km = 0.621 mi
