= M-10 highway (Montenegro) =

Highway in Montenegro

M-10 highway
- Magistralni put M-10

Route information
- Length: 58.3 km (36.2 mi)
- Existed: 1978–present

Major junctions
- East end: M-3 / E-762 in Podgorica
- R-1 in Cetinje
- West end: M-1 / E-65 / E-80 in Bečići

Location
- Country: Montenegro
- Municipalities: Budva, Cetinje, Podgorica

Highway system
- Transport in Montenegro; Motorways
← M-9	→ M-11

M-10 highway (Montenegrin: Magistralni put M-10) (previously known as M-2.3 highway) is a Montenegrin roadway.

== History ==
Construction of the Budva–Cetinje section of the highway occurred during the Interwar period. The extension to Podgorica and further construction to bring it to highway standards occurred after World War II, and the highway was officially opened for traffic in 1978. Since 2001, many steeper sections of the road have been upgraded with third lane, and by 2017 road has been almost fully reconstructed, with new surface, and with more than half of the highway now with three lanes instead of two.

In January 2016, the Ministry of Transport and Maritime Affairs published bylaw on categorisation of state roads. With new categorisation, M-2.3 highway was renamed as M-10 highway.

== Major intersections ==
Municipality	Location	km	mi	Destinations	Notes
Podgorica	Podgorica	0.0	0.0	M-3 / E-762 – Nikšić	
Cetinje	Cetinje	30.6	19.0	R-1 – Čevo, Kotor, Nikšić	
Budva	Bečići	58.3	36.2	M-1 / E-65 / E-80 – Budva, Petrovac na Moru	
1.000 mi = 1.609 km; 1.000 km = 0.621 mi
