= Basri Çapriqi =

Albanian poet

Basri Çapriqi (1960–2018) was an Albanian poet and literary critic.

== Biography ==
He was born in Krute (Krytha) in Ulcinj Municipality (Ulqin), present-day Montenegro and studied Albanian language and literature at the University of Pristina. He was professor of style, semiotics, and contemporary poetry at the Academy of Arts of Kosovo. He published seven anthologies of poetry and five works on literary criticism. Since 2012 he was a member of the Academy of Sciences of Albania. He has been considered a leading poet in the Albanian community in Montenegro.
