= R-22 regional road (Montenegro) =

Road in Montenegro

R-22 regional road
- Regionalni put R-22

Route information
- Length: 14.6 km (9.1 mi)

Major junctions
- West end: M-1 in Ulcinj
- East end: Ada Bojana

Location
- Country: Montenegro
- Municipalities: Ulcinj

Highway system
- Transport in Montenegro; Motorways
← R-21	→ R-23

R-22 regional road (Montenegrin: Regionalni put R-22) is a Montenegrin roadway.

This road serves as an extension for M-1 highway from Ulcinj to the southernmost part of Montenegro, Ada Bojana.

== History ==
In January 2016, the Ministry of Transport and Maritime Affairs published bylaw on categorisation of state roads. With new categorisation, R-17 regional road was renamed as R-22 regional road.

== Major intersections ==
Municipality	Location	km	mi	Destinations	Notes
Ulcinj	Ulcinj	0.0	0.0	M-1 – Bar	
Ulcinj	Ada Bojana	14.6	9.1		
1.000 mi = 1.609 km; 1.000 km = 0.621 mi
