= Krute =

Krute Круте Krythë
- Village
- Location within Montenegro
- Coordinates: 42.014°N 19.261°E
- Country: Montenegro
- Region: Coastal
- Municipality: Ulcinj

Population (2011)
  - Total: 525
- Time zone: UTC+1 (CET)
  - Summer (DST): UTC+2 (CEST)
- Car plates: UL

Krute (Montenegrin Cyrillic: Круте; Albanian: Krythë) is a village in the municipality of Ulcinj, southeastern Montenegro. It is located north-east of Ulcinj town.

== Name ==
Krytha's name has its origin in the medieval Albanian tribe of Kryethi. It is alternatively known as Krytha e Katërkollës to differentiate by another village of the same to the north of Ulcinj, Krytha e Ulqinit.

== History ==
Venetian diplomat Mariano Bolizza who travelled in the area in 1614 recorded that it was a Catholic village with 30 households and 75 men-in-arms commanded by Gjur Çeka.

== Demographics ==
Population of Krute
Year	Pop.	±%
2003	606	—
2011	525	−13.4%

According to Montenegro's 2011 census, Krute has a population of 525. Krute has slightly more men than women; there are 271 men (51.6%) and 254 women (48.4%). A significant portion of the population (439, or 83.6%) is over the age of 15. According to Montenegro's 2011 census, the majority of residents are ethnically Albanian (91.4%) with minority groups of Montenegrins as well as people who identify as Muslim ethnically. A similar majority (91.8%) consider Albanian to be their mother tongue, with the remaining population identifying either Montenegrin (7.2%) or "other" (0.95%) as their mother tongue. Additionally, 521 (99.2%) of the residents practice Islam.

Ethnicity	Number	Percentage
Albanians	480	91.43%
Muslims	24	4.57%
Montenegrins	16	3.05%
Other	5	0.95%
Total	525	100%

== Notable people ==
- Basri Çapriqi, poet
