= European route E851 =

Road in trans-European E-road network

E851

Route information
- Length: 323 km (201 mi)

Major junctions
- From: Petrovac
- To: Pristina

Location
- Countries: Montenegro, Albania, Kosovo

Highway system
- International E-road network; A Class; B Class

European route E 851 is a road part of the International E-road network. It begins in Petrovac, Montenegro, passes through northern Albania and ends in Pristina, Kosovo.

== Route ==
- Montenegro
  - M-1 Petrovac (Start of Concurrency with E-65 E-80) - Sutomore (End of Concurrency with E-65 E-80) - Sukobin
- Albania
  - A1 Lezhë
- Kosovo
  - R7 Prizren
  - E-65 E-80 Pristina
