= Meljine =

Town in Herceg Novi, Montenegro

Meljine Мељине
- Town
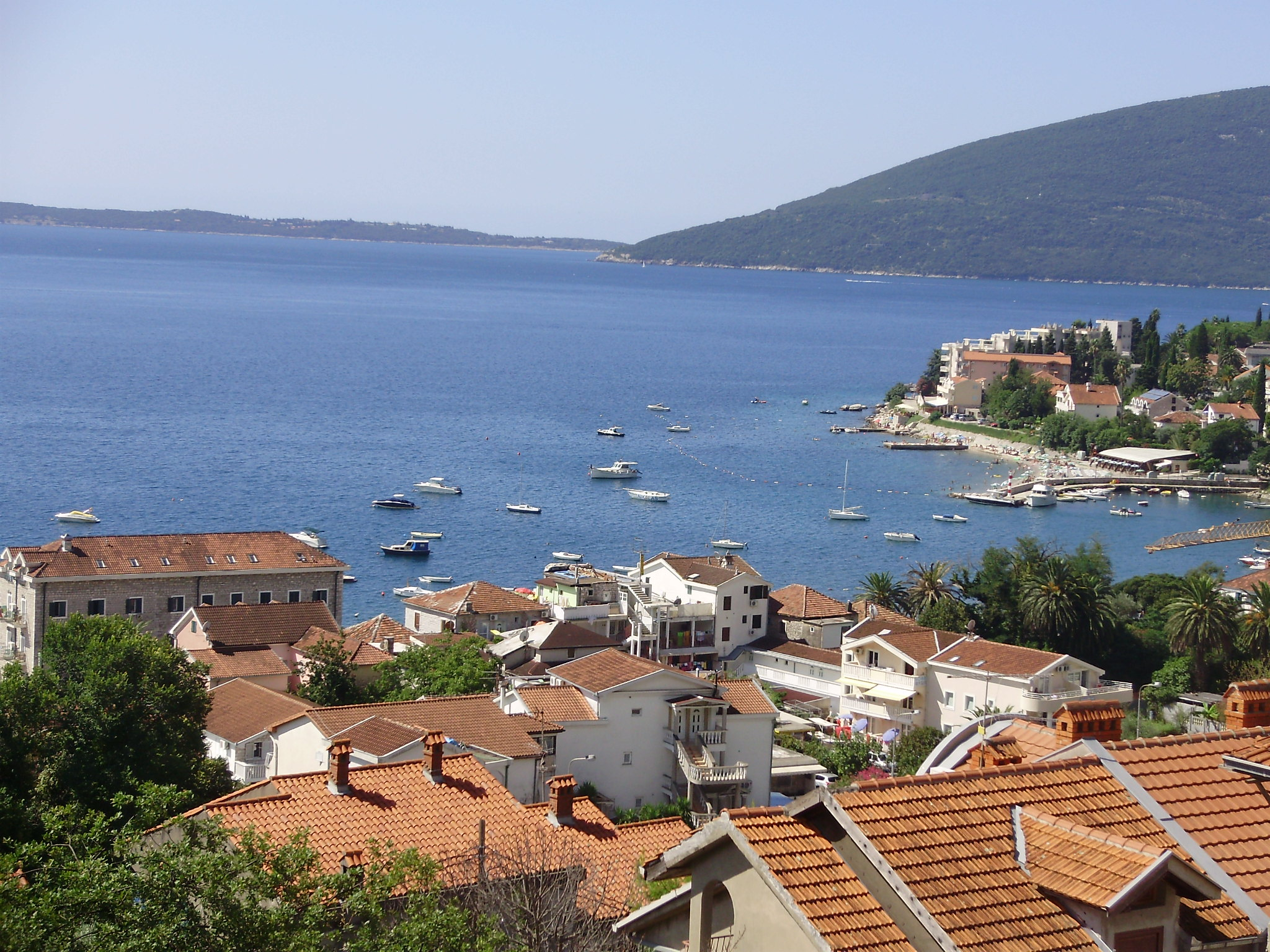

- Location within Montenegro
- Country: Montenegro
- Region: Coastal
- Municipality: Herceg Novi

Population (2011)
  - Total: 1,123
- Time zone: UTC+1 (CET)
  - Summer (DST): UTC+2 (CEST)

Meljine (Montenegrin and Serbian: Мељине) is a small town located in the municipality of Herceg Novi, Montenegro.

== Demographics ==
According to the 2003 census, the town has a population of 1,120 people.

According to the 2011 census, its population was 1,123.

Ethnicity in 2011
Ethnicity	Number	Percentage
Serbs	574	51.1%
Montenegrins	351	31.3%
Roma	51	4.5%
Croats	21	1.9%
other/undeclared	126	11.2%
Total	1,123	100%
