= Lepetani =

Lepetani Лепетани
- Village
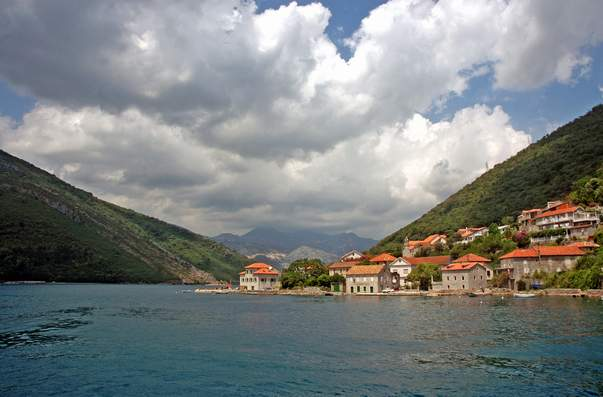

- Location within Montenegro
- Coordinates: 42.465817°N 18.686401°E
- Country: Montenegro
- Region: Coastal
- Municipality: Tivat

Population (2011)
  - Total: 184
- Time zone: UTC+1 (CET)
  - Summer (DST): UTC+2 (CEST)

Lepetani (Montenegrin: Лепетани) is a village in the municipality of Tivat, Montenegro. It is located north of Tivat, and just south of the Verige crossing.

== Demographics ==
According to the 2011 census, it had a population of 184 people.

Ethnicity in 2011
Ethnicity	Number	Percentage
Serbs	56	30.4%
Croats	53	28.8%
Montenegrins	53	28.8%
other/undeclared	22	12.0%
Total	184	100%

== History ==
In the mid-16th century, the village of St. Lovrijenac was renamed Lepetane, after the old Perast family Lepetan, which owned property in the area. Joanes Lepetan appointed Tripun Zagurija in 1504, son of the late Ilija, as his proxy in a dispute with his brother Nikola.

Today, Lepetane is home to the ferry crossing between the town and Kamenari, on the other side of the bay.
