= Sozina Tunnel =

Road tunnel in Montenegro

- Interactive map of Sozina Tunnel

Overview
- Location: Sutomore, Montenegro
- Coordinates: 42.1825°N 19.0414°E

Operation
- Opened: 13 July 2005
- Toll: Yes

Technical
- Length: 4,189 m (13,743 ft)
- No. of lanes: 2

The Sozina Tunnel (Montenegrin: Тунел Созина, romanized: Tunel Sozina) is a road tunnel in Montenegro that is a part of the M-1.1 highway (E65 and E80 European routes). It is located north of Sutomore and south of Virpazar, and is designed to bypass the "Paštrovska Gora" mountain range that separates the Montenegrin coast from the Zeta plain and the Skadar Lake basin. The Sozina road tunnel is 4,189 m long, and is the longest and most modern vehicular tunnel in Montenegro (however this is not the longest tunnel in Montenegro since the eponymous train tunnel is 6 km in length). It was opened on 13 July 2005, coinciding with Montenegro's national day. It was built at a cost of 70 million euros. Since 15 July 2005 a toll is collected at the tunnel entrance, using an open toll system.

The Sozina Tunnel shortens the journey from the capital of Podgorica to Bar, Montenegro's main port, by some 25 km. The trip between the two cities now takes about an hour by car.
