= Vladimir, Ulcinj =

Vladimir Владимир Katërkollë
- Village
- Location within Montenegro
- Country: Montenegro
- Region: Coastal
- Municipality: Ulcinj
- Elevation: 39 m (128 ft)

Population (2011)
  - Total: 757
- Time zone: UTC+1 (CET)

Vladimir (Montenegrin Cyrillic: Владимир; Albanian: Katërkollë) is a village in the municipality of Ulcinj, Montenegro.

== Demographics ==
According to Montenegro's 2011 census, the population of Vladimir is 99.6% ethnically Albanian. Moreover, 99.2% of the town's population considers Albanian to be their mother tongue. Approximately 99.5% of the population follow Islam.

== Notes ==
- ^aMontenegrin Cyrillic spelling
- ^bAlbanian name
