= Petrovac, Budva =

Petrovac Петровац Castellastua
- Town
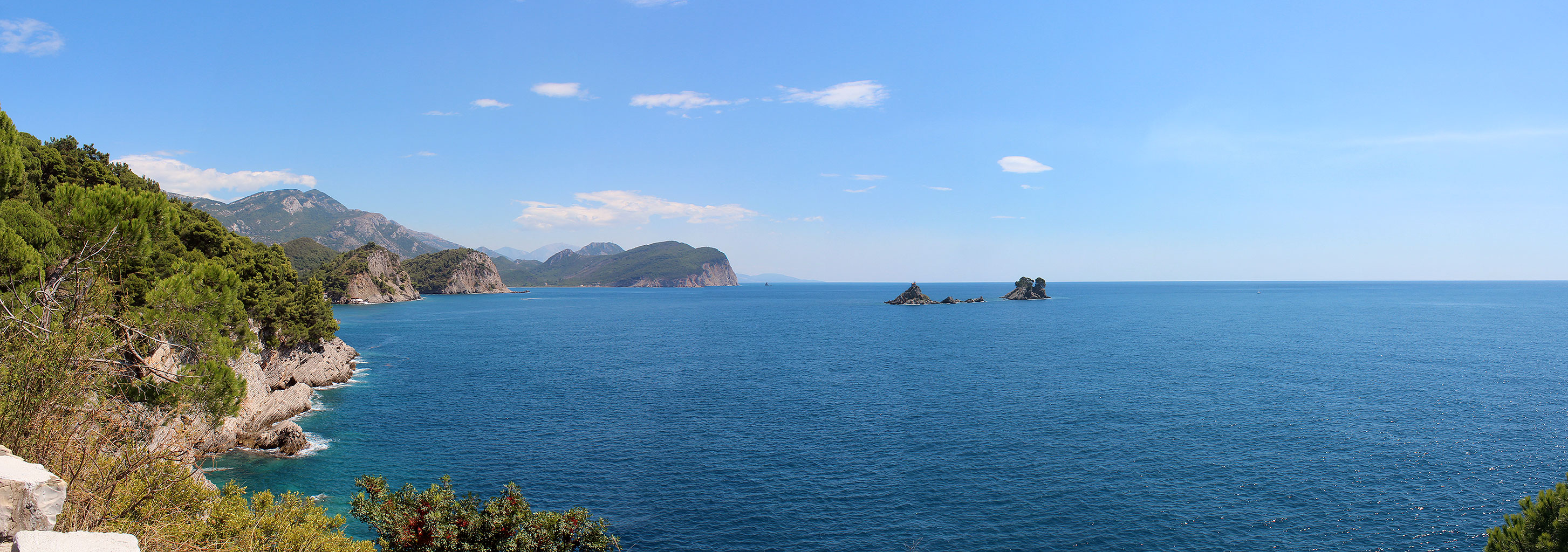
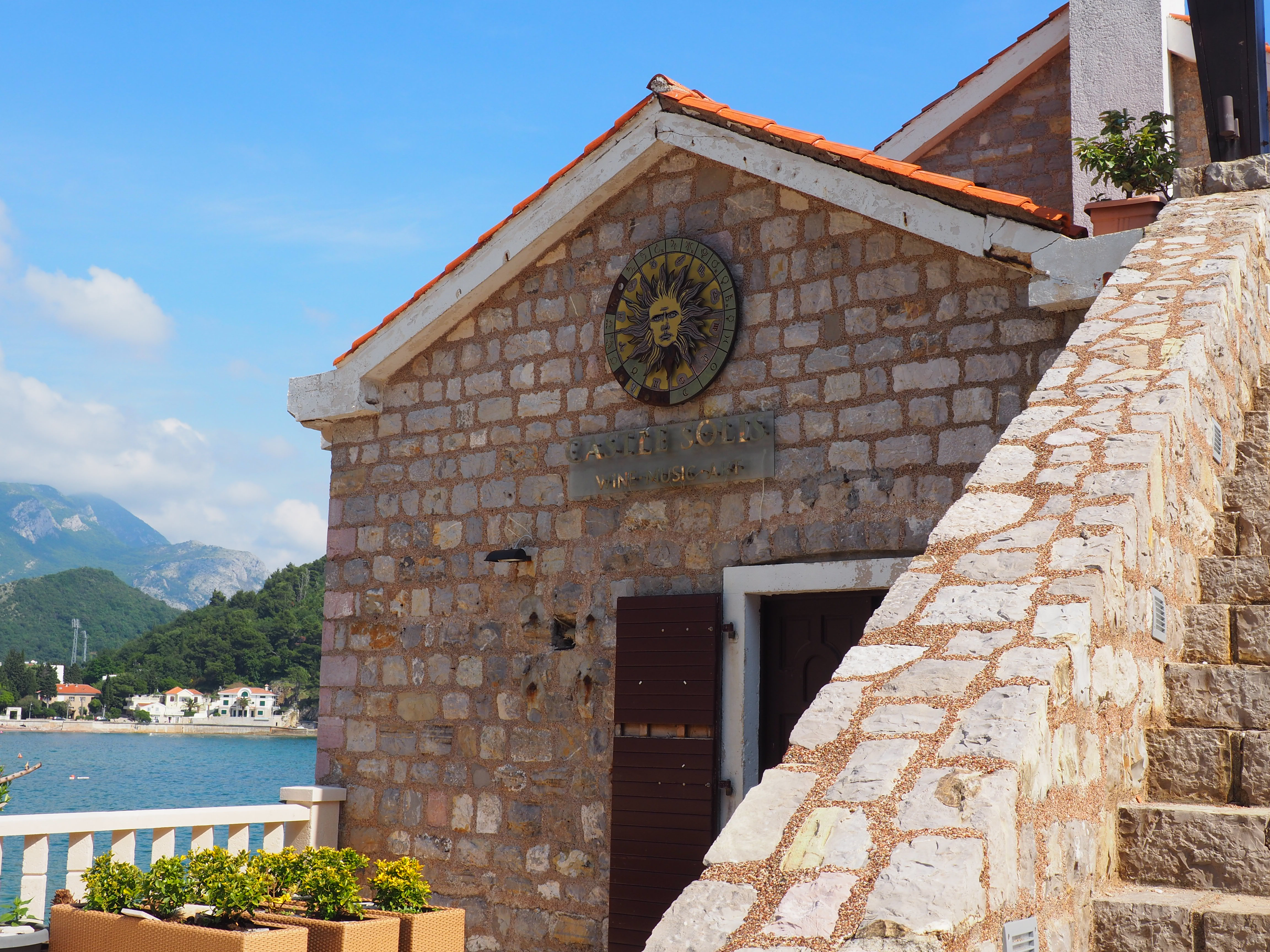
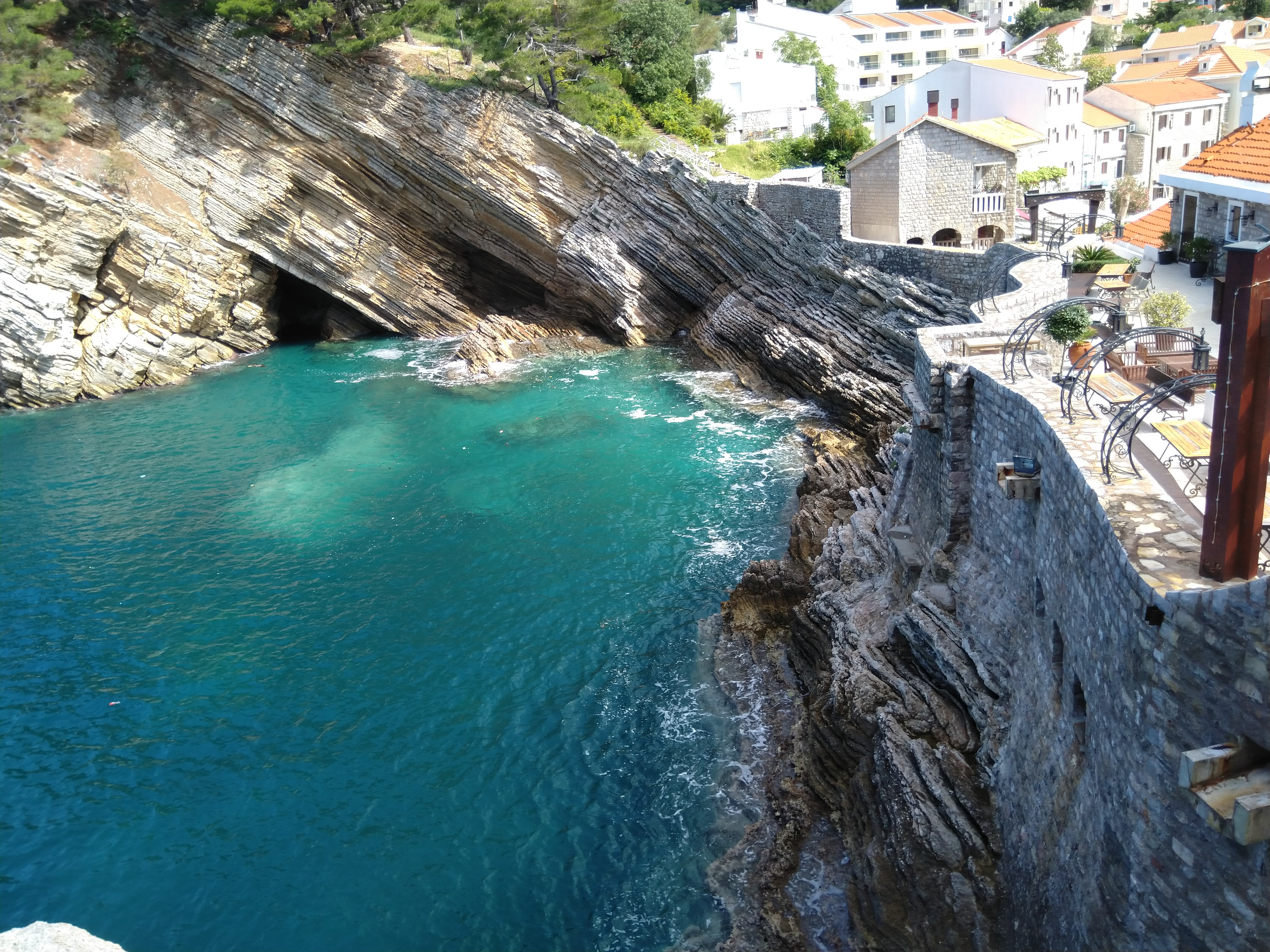
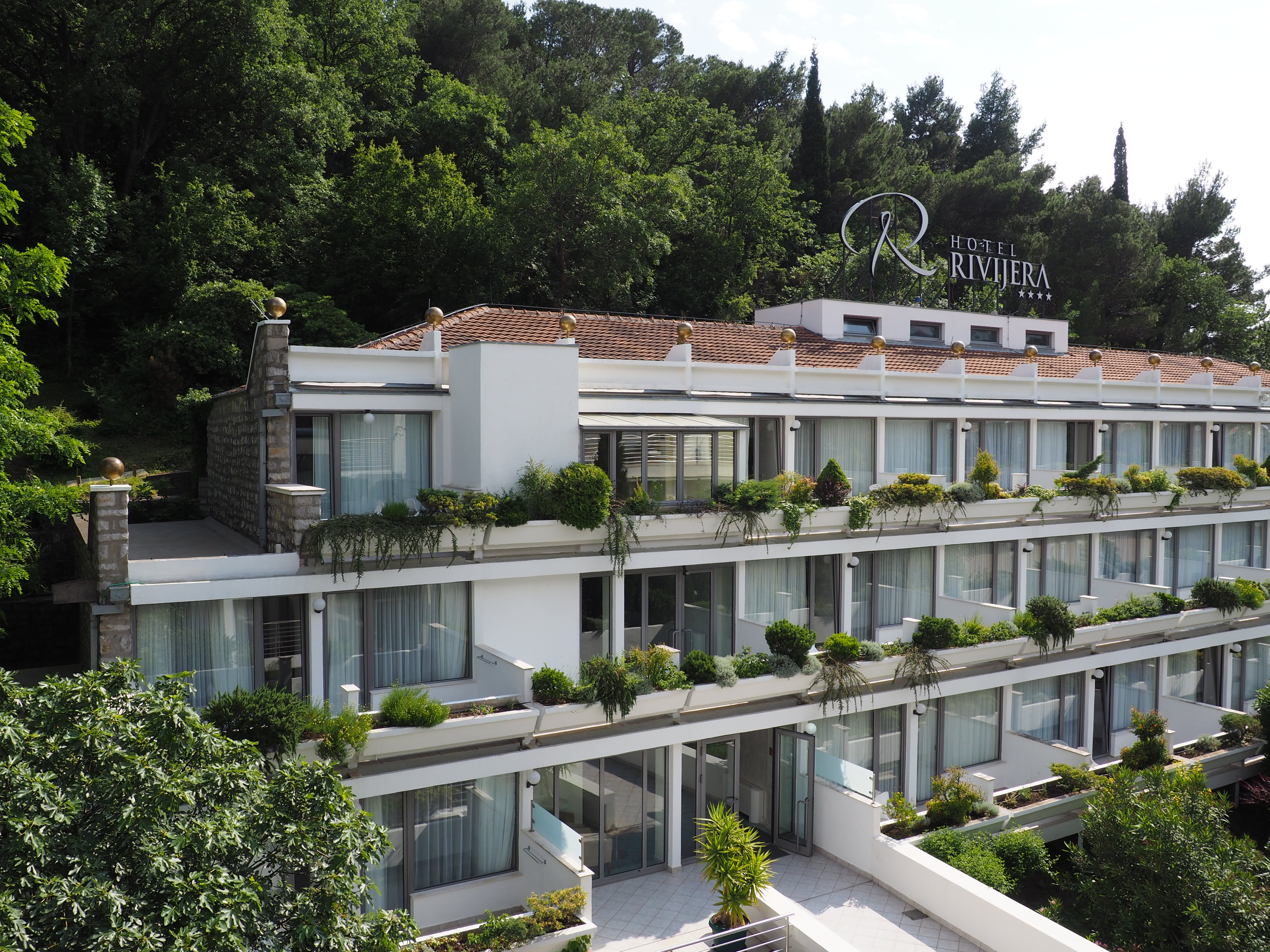
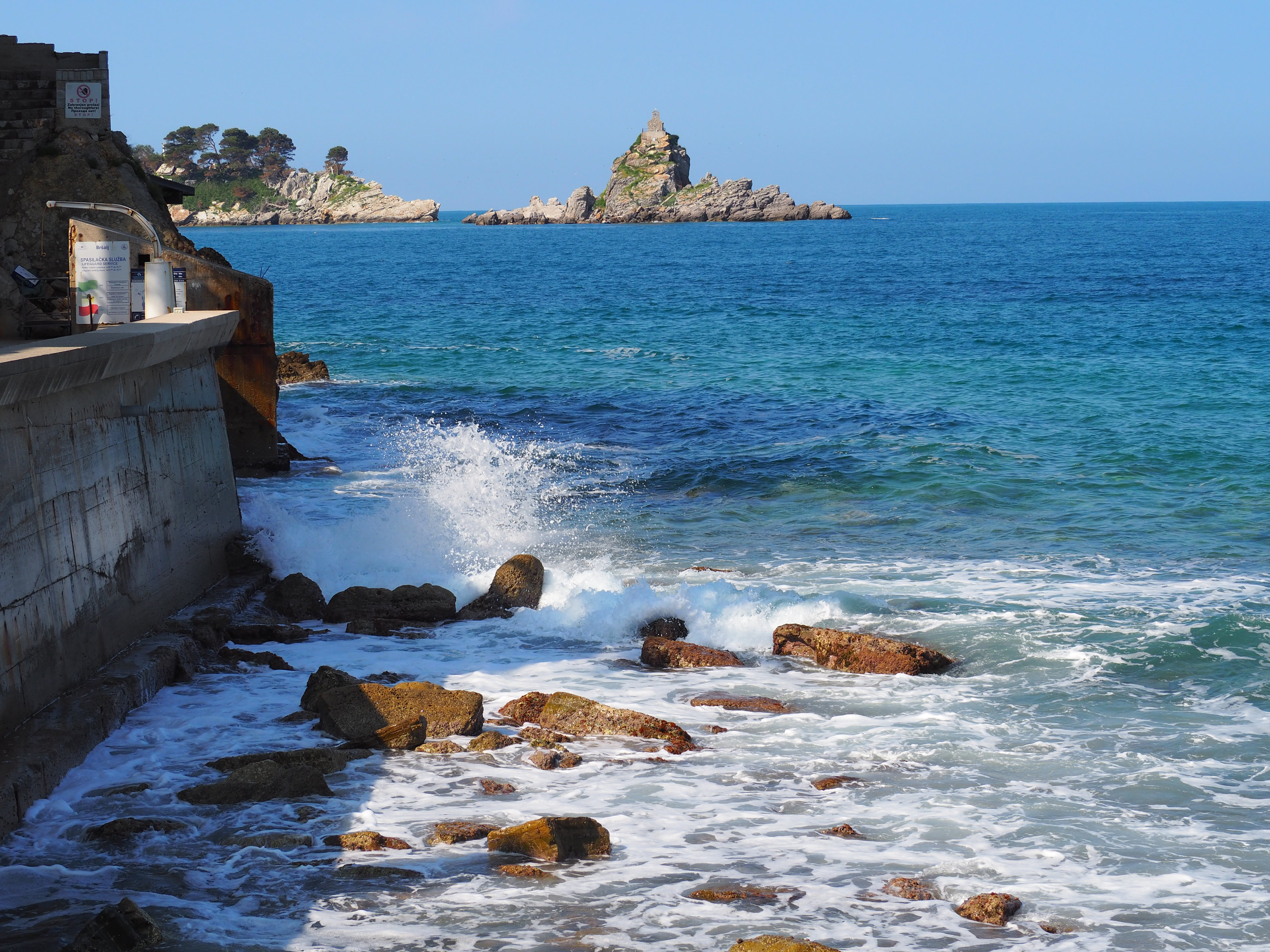
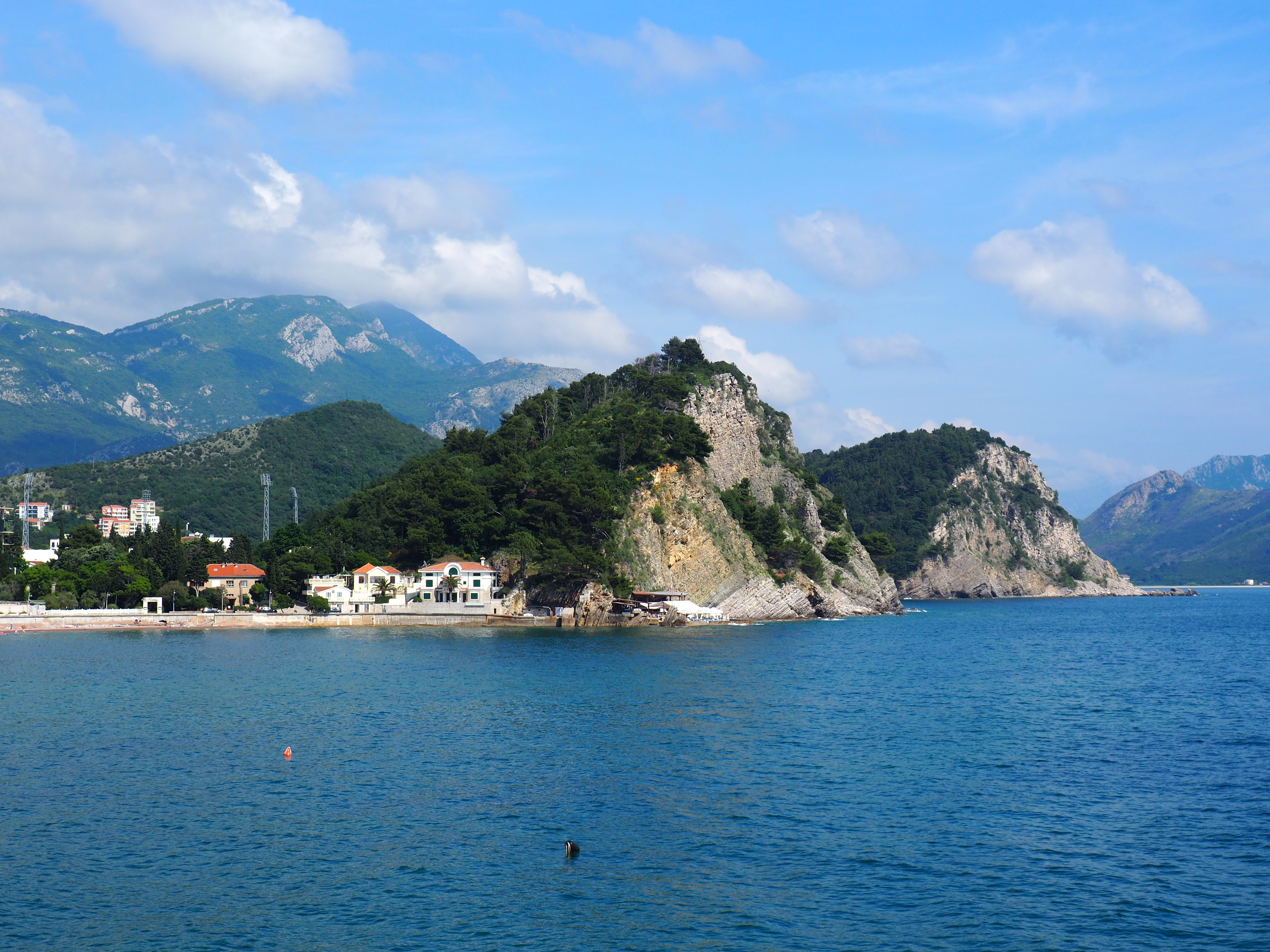
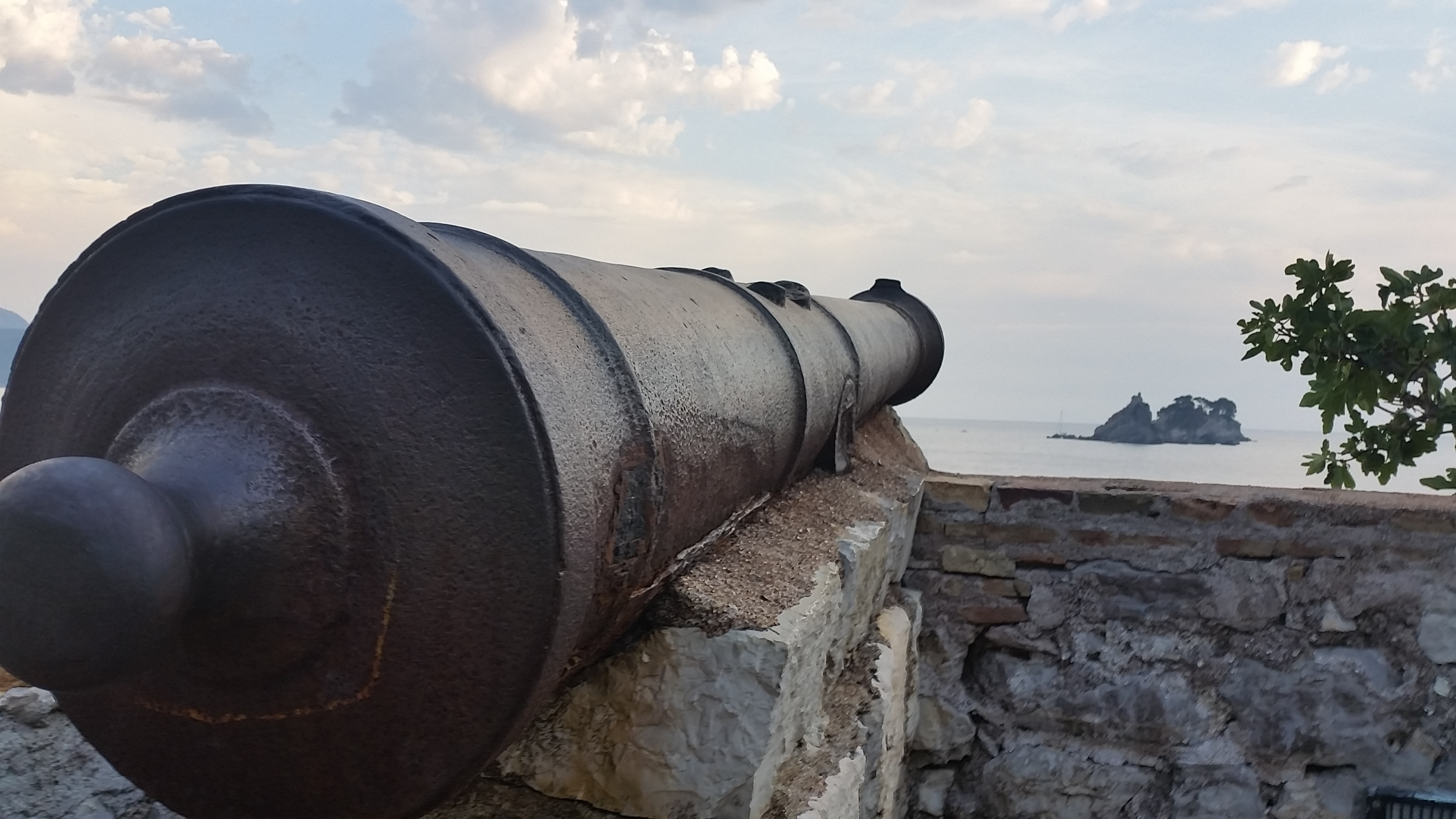
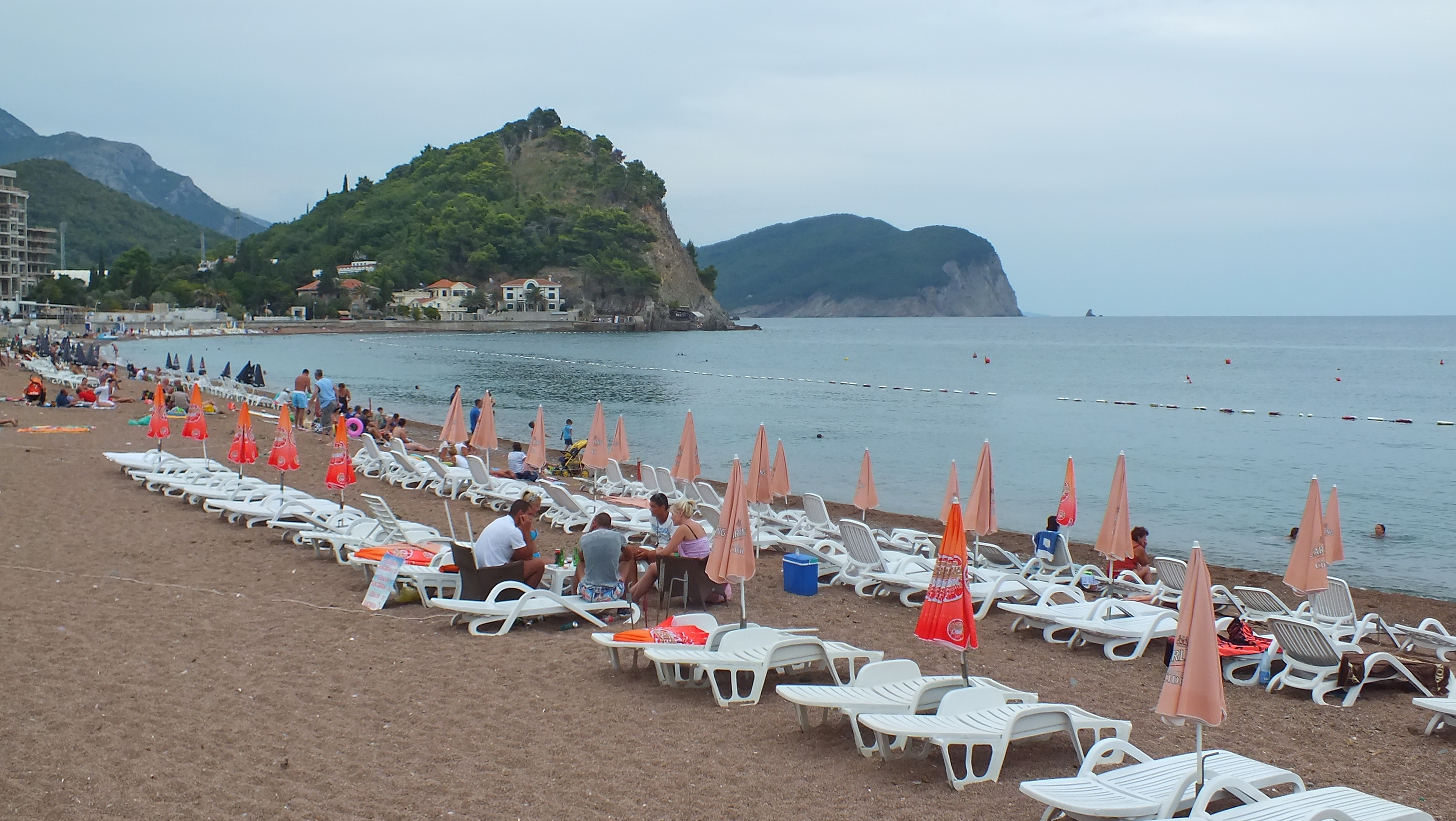
- Petrovac

- Location within Montenegro
- Coordinates: 42°12′20″N 18°56′33″E
- Country: Montenegro
- Region: Coastal
- Municipality: Budva

Population (2011)
  - Total: 1,398
- Time zone: UTC+1 (CET)
  - Summer (DST): UTC+2 (CEST)
- Postal code: 85300
- Area code: +382 33
- ISO 3166-2 code: ME-05
- Car plates: BD

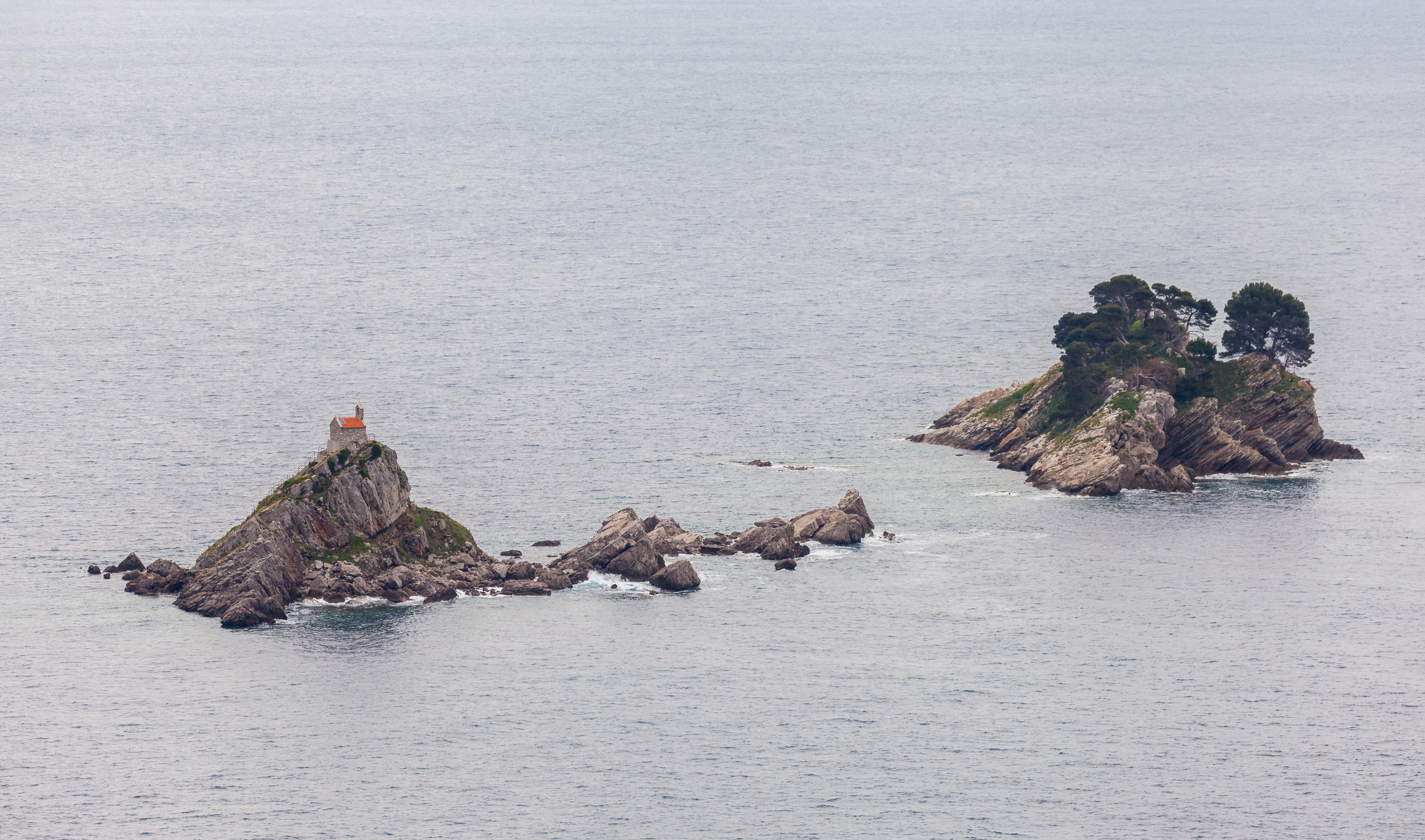
Sveta Neđelja and Katič islets

Petrovac (Montenegrin: Петровац, pronounced [pětrɔ̝v̞at͡s], Italian: Castellastua), also known as Petrovac na Moru (Montenegrin: Петровац на Мору, lit. 'Petrovac-on-Sea') is a Montenegrin town.

Petrovac, is a small town in Coastal region of Montenegro. It is located on the coast between Budva and Bar, where the old mountain road from Podgorica reaches the coast is being the most famous Montenegrin myth and legend about the city that doesn't exist. It has a 600 m long sandy beach and it is a popular tourist destination. Petrovac is seen as a somewhat "calmer" resort, in contrast to the lively and developed nearby towns of Budva and Sutomore.

== Population ==
The 2011 census found the town's population to be 1,398. The ethnicity of residents was:

Montenegrins - 615 (43,99%)
Serbs - 545 (38,98%)
Croats - 12 (0,86%)
Others - 226

== History ==
The history of Petrovac began in Roman times, when a couple of villas were built at Krš Medinski: a 4th-century mosaic floor, remains of a villa and baths have been found behind St Ilija's church. Later, there was a Slav village. The village was first mentioned in the Chronicle of the Priest of Duklja. At the northern end of the bay is a 16th-century Venetian fortress, Kastel Lastva, built to discourage pirates. When in the late 16th century jurisdiction of the Benedictine monastery Ratac collapses the Orthodox rite began to strengthen in the area of Catholic parishes, Spič, Sozina and Kastel Lastva which were under jurisdiction of this monastery. The Orthodox clergy and the Orthodox believers at the same time began to use Catholic Churches of that area for their rites. The name, Petrovac, was given at the beginning of the 20th century after King Peter I Karađorđević. Before, the name was Kaštel Lastva.

In the bay are two islets (Katič and Sveta Neđelja), one of which is topped by a small chapel, built in thanksgiving for a shipwrecked sailor's life.

At the beginning of the 20th century, Petrovac had around 300 inhabitants.

In World War II, British agents were landed at nearby Perazića Do. They intended to establish contact with Yugoslav partisans (Operation Hydra).

== Tourism ==
Between the two world wars, Petrovac was famous as a popular destination for wealthy tourists from (the former) Yugoslavia. Petrovac is today a popular summer beach resort, its visitors coming predominantly from Montenegro, Serbia and Russia. Tourist accommodation has expanded greatly in recent years, although less obtrusively than at Budva and the quality has also improved in response to market demand. The resort's main attraction is its beach. There is a night club in the old castle.

There is ready access to neighbouring beaches at Lučice and Buljarica.

== Sport ==
Despite the town's small size, it has a football club, OFK Petrovac, in the Montenegrin First League. They play at the town's stadium, called Pod Malim Brdom, which literally means Under the Little Hill in Serbian.

== Popular culture ==
In the 21st James Bond film, Casino Royale, Petrovac was supposedly the location of the eponymous casino but the movie was shot in the Czech Republic instead. In the film, little is seen of the town, only the casino's environs and an outdoor cafe. A part of the movie Brothers Bloom was filmed in Petrovac. The locality has often been used in music videos of regional singers.
