= Virpazar =

Virpazar Вирпазар
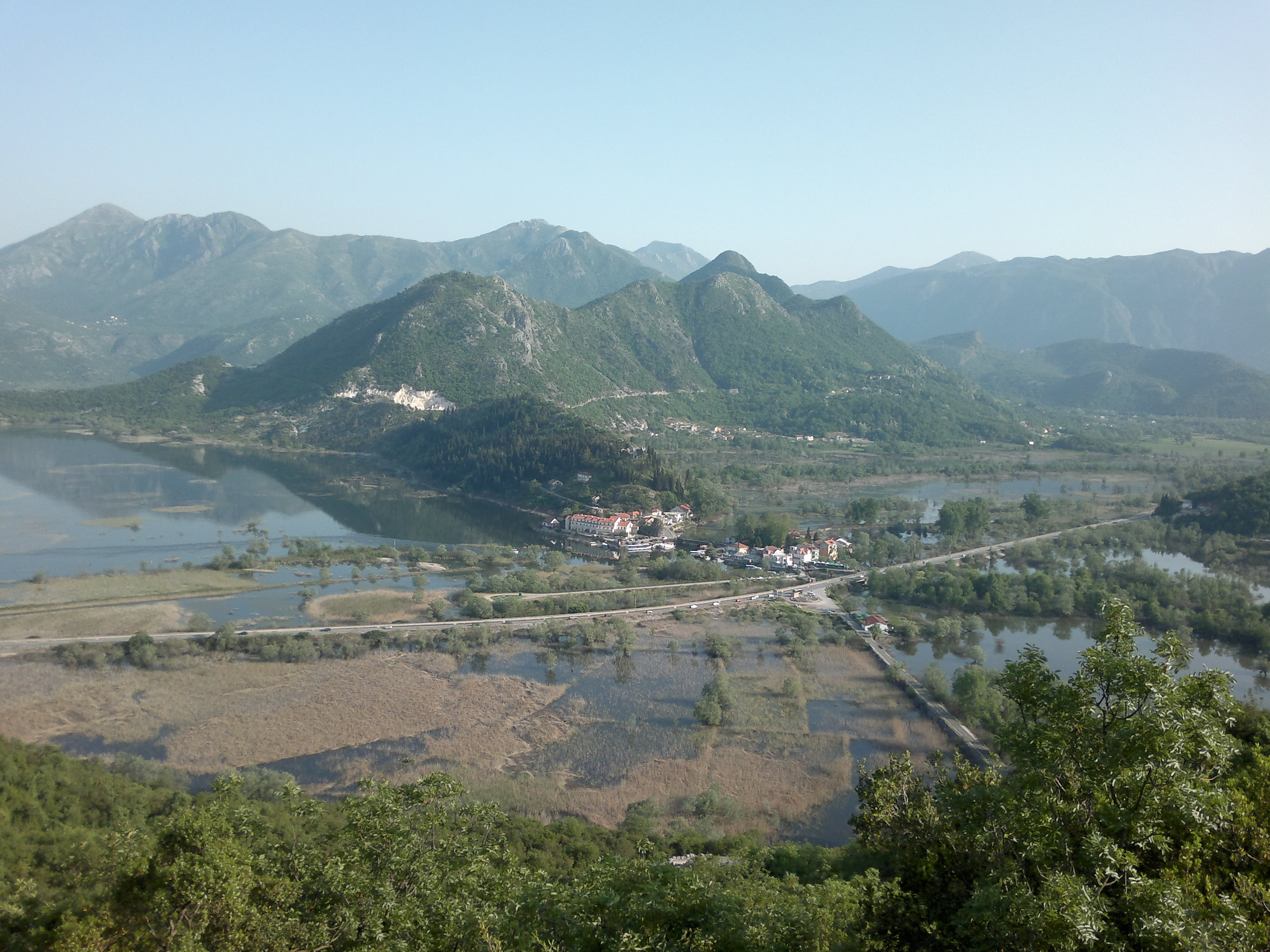

- Location within Montenegro
- Coordinates: 42°14′06″N 19°05′28″E
- Country: Montenegro
- Municipality: Bar

Population (2011)
  - Total: 277
- Time zone: UTC+1 (CET)
  - Summer (DST): UTC+2 (CEST)

Virpazar (Montenegrin Cyrillic: Вирпазар, pronounced [v̞îrpazaːr]) is a village in the municipality of Bar, Montenegro.

== Overview ==
It is located in the Crmnica region, straddling the Crmnica river, which flows into nearby Skadar Lake. There are various tourist facilities including hotels.

There is a station on the Belgrade–Bar railway and a road leaves the main Podgorica–Bar highway and follows the western shore of the lake towards Albania.

== Demographics ==
According to the 2011 census, its population was 277.

Ethnicity in 2011
Ethnicity	Number	Percentage
Montenegrins	175	63.2%
Serbs	77	27.8%
other/undeclared	25	9.0%
Total	277	100%

== Gallery ==
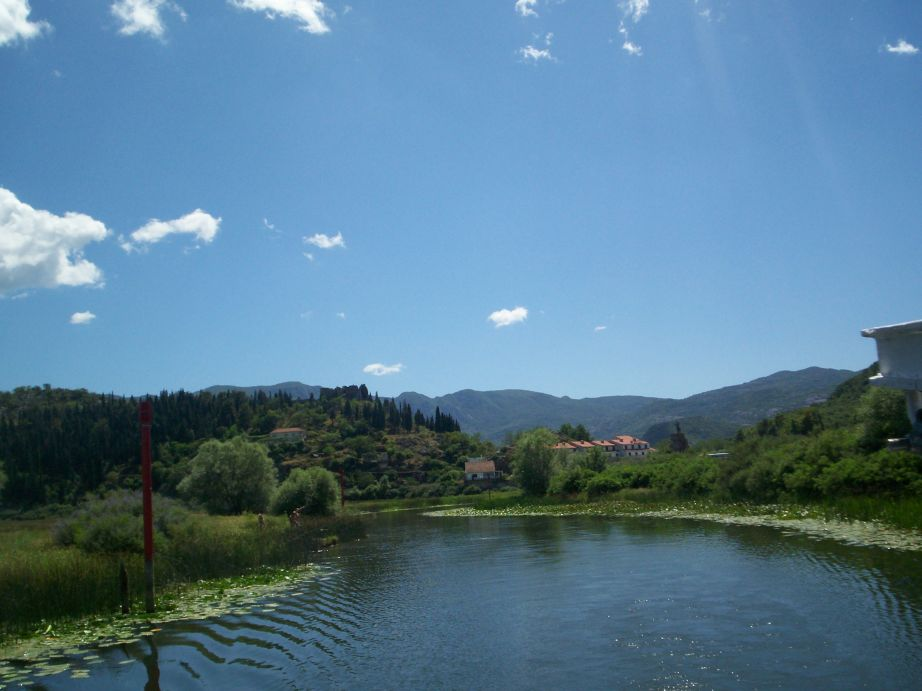
The village seen from the channel leading to Lake Skadar

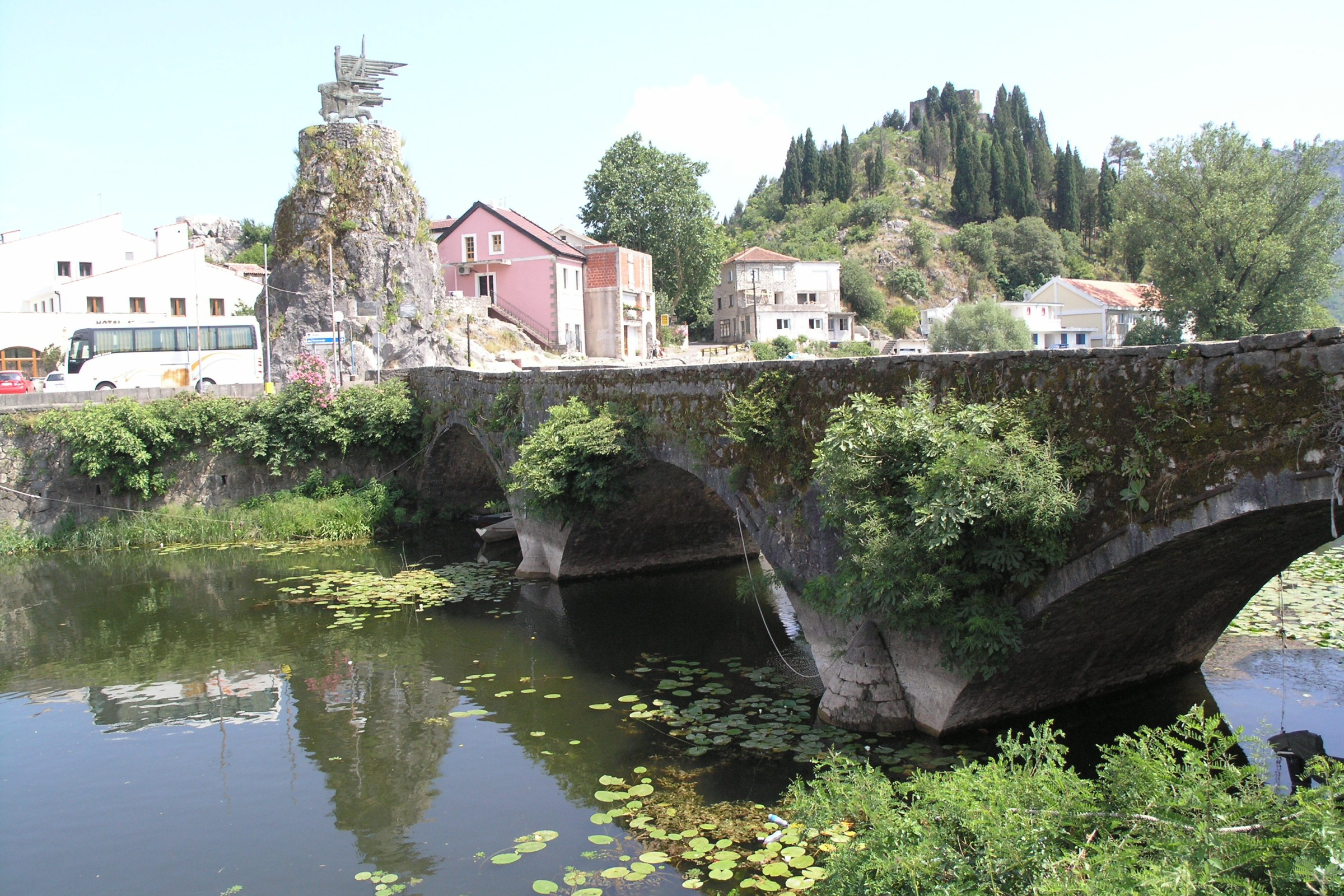
The bridge on the Crmnica in Virpazar

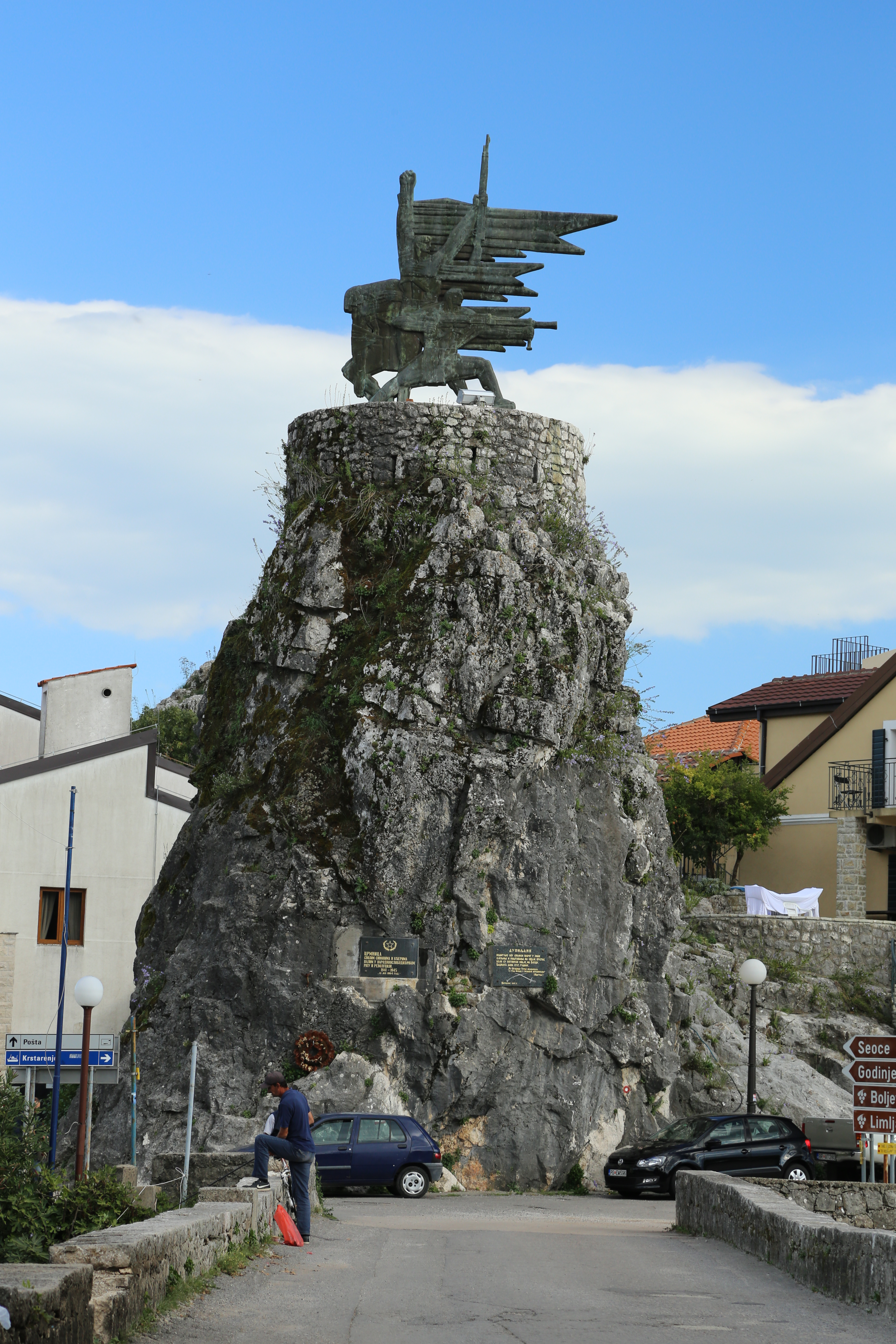
The monument at the end of the bridge

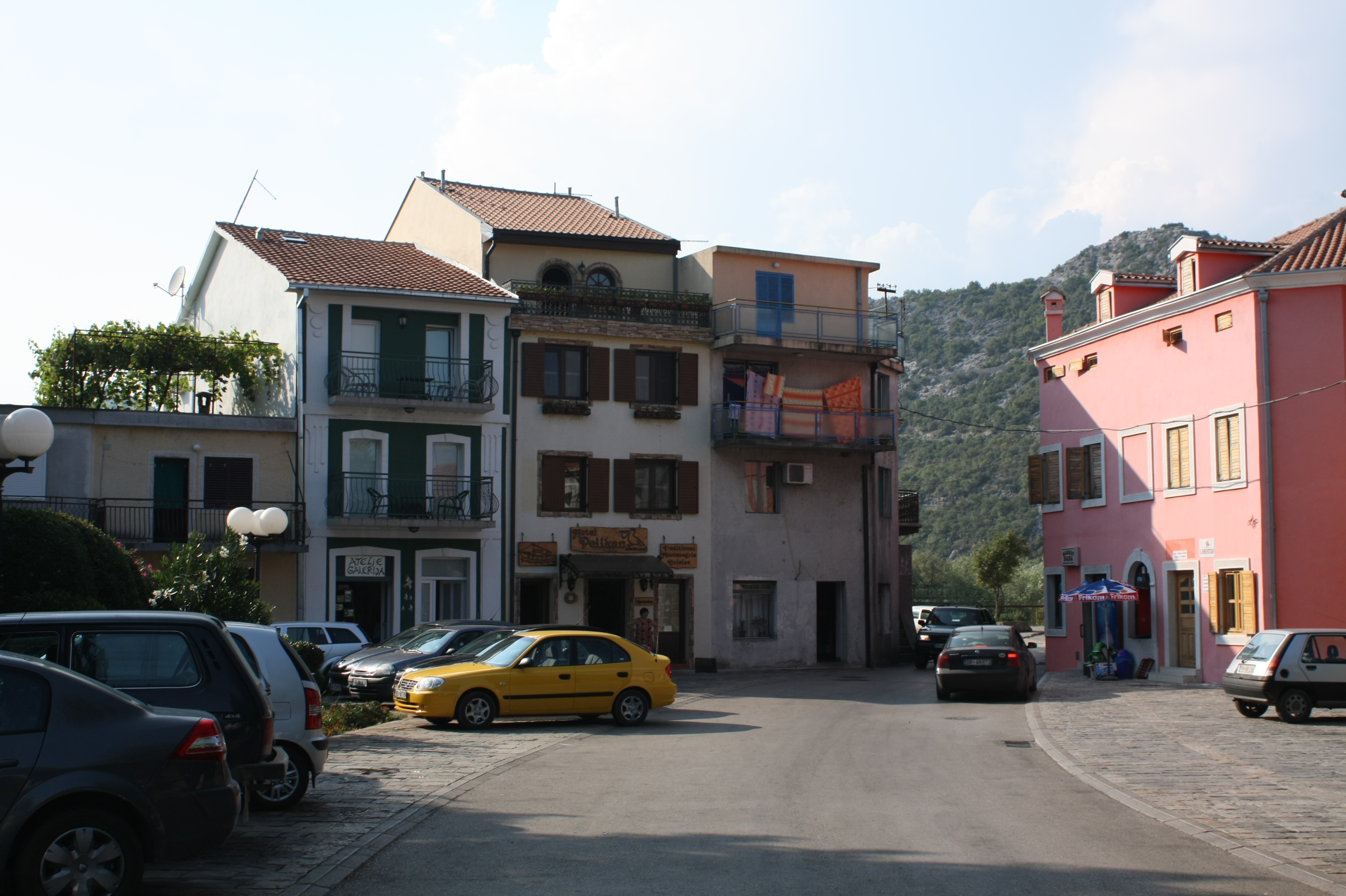
Virpazar - village centre
