= Motorways in Montenegro =

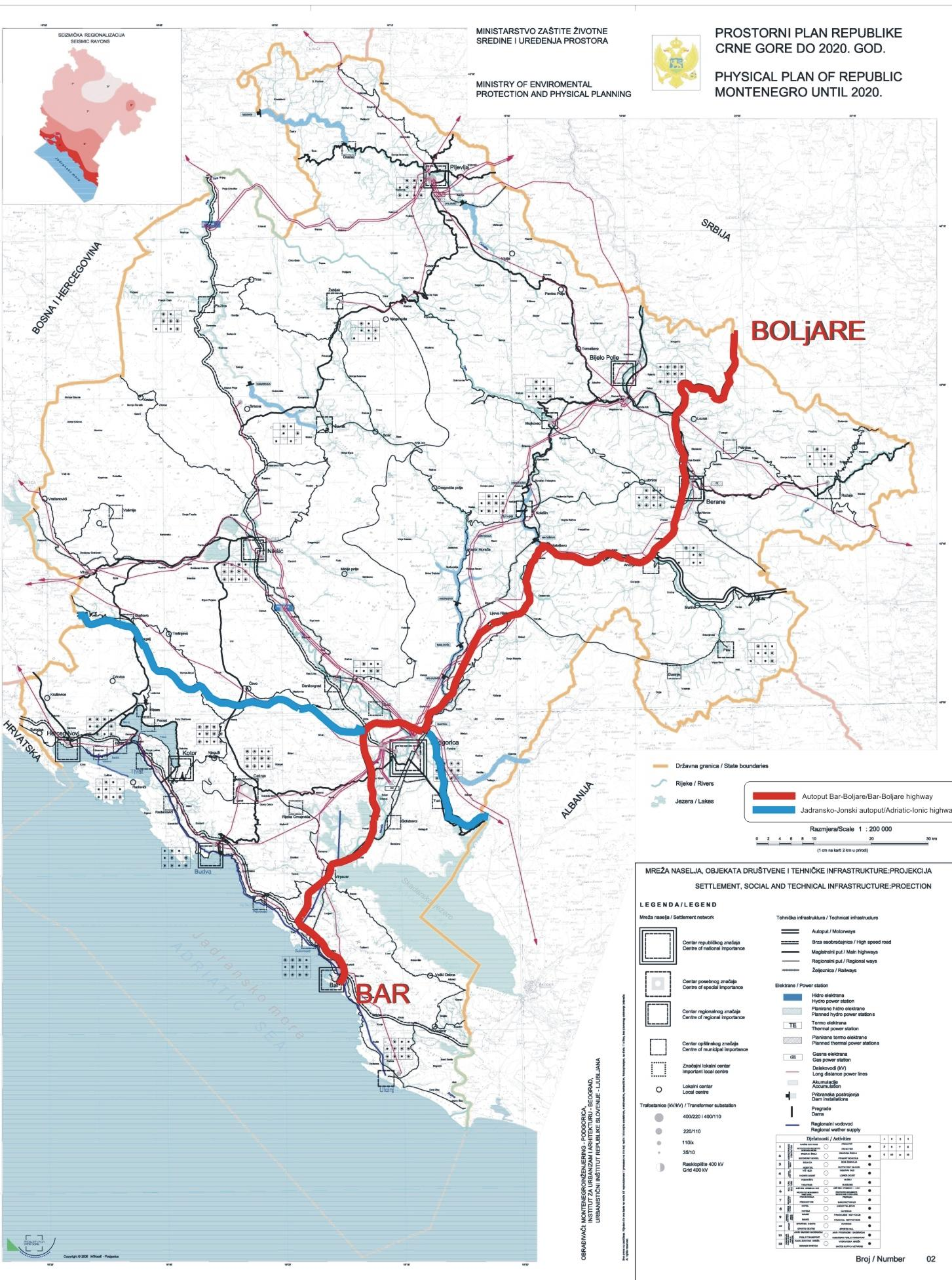
Planned network of Montenegrin motorways - the Beograd-Bar motorway (red) and the Adriatic-Ionian motorway (blue)

Montenegro has had a motorway since July 13, 2022, when the first section of the Bar-Boljare motorway was inaugurated.

On Montenegrin motorways, the speed limit is 100 kilometres per hour (62 mph).

A deal worth almost 700 million euros: Construction of the Mateševo–Andrijevica motorway section started since 26th of June.

Preparatory works on the second section of the Bar–Boljare motorway started since 26th of June in Mateševo, a project that is to connect the existing Smokovac–Mateševo route with Andrijevica and open a new phase of construction of the most important road in Montenegro. The section, approximately 22 to 23 kilometers long, will be built by the Chinese consortium PowerChina–STECOL–PCCD, with financing from the EBRD, the European Union and the state of Montenegro.

== Belgrade–Bar Motorway ==
The Belgrade–Bar motorway, also known in Serbian and Montenegrin as Аутопут Београд–Бар (Autoput Beograd–Bar) will measure 445 kilometres (277 mi) and be part of the European route E763 (E763). Construction has already begun in Serbia as the A2 motorway with a length of 103.1 kilometres (64.1 mi), as well as in Montenegro (Smokovac–Mateševo). The whole motorway in Montenegro from Bar to the border with Serbia in Boljare will be 165.2 kilometres (102.7 mi). It is a challenging project, which has been divided into five component parts (dionica). It will have a total of 42 tunnels and 92 bridges. The first part of construction is financed as a public–private partnership project, and the contractor was the Chinese company CRBC. The Smokovac–Mateševo section of motorway cost approximately €1 billion. The motorway is subject to a toll payment like in other countries of the former Yugoslavia. For the currently open section - 41 kilometres (25 mi) - the toll for passenger vehicles is 3.50 euros. At the beginning of 2022, the Ministry of Capital Investments announced the development of a conceptual project for the second section, from Mateševo to Andrijevica, whose deadline for development is the end of the year. The preliminary estimated value of the construction of this 23.5 km (14.6 miles) long section is €552.5 million. The Minister of Capital Investments, Ervin Ibrahimović, announced in an interview on January 8, 2023 that the next section of the highway to be built will be Mateševo–Andrijevica, with the selection of the contractor and supervision in 2025.

Construction overview
Part no.	Route	Total length (km)	In service (km)	Under construction (km)	Performance phase
1	Đurmani–Virpazar	11.2	0.0	0.0	Planned
2	Virpazar–Farmaci–Smokovac (Podgorica By-Pass)	38.0	0.0	0.0	Planned
3A	Smokovac–Veruša–Uvač	34.0	34.0	0.0	Opened on 7/2022
3B	Uvač–Mateševo	7.0	7.0	0.0	Opened on 7/2022
4A	Mateševo–Andrijevica	23.0	0.0	0.0	Currently under construction
4B	Andrijevica–Berane	11.0	0.0	0.0	Planned
5	Berane–Boljare	41.0	0.0	0.0	Planned

== Adriatic–Ionian Motorway ==
The planned Adriatic–Ionian motorway at around 100 kilometres (62 mi) long should link both Montenegro with Bosnia and Herzegovina in the west and, in the east, its capital Podgorica with Albania. From there it may continue through Albania and further reach Greece. A part of Podgorica's bypass, around 10 kilometres (6.2 mi) in length, may be shared with the Bar–Boljare motorway.
