= Bosnia and Herzegovina–Montenegro border =

The border between Bosnia and Herzegovina and Montenegro starts in the North at the tripoint with Serbia near Đakovići and continues winding southward until it reaches the tripoint with Croatia near Grab. The border is 225 km (140 mi) long.

== Border crossings ==
There are currently 8 functioning border crossings between the two countries. The following is a table of the crossing points, listed from North to South:

(Bosnia and Herzegovina) Bosnian checkpoint	Municipality	(Montenegro) Montenegrin checkpoint	Municipality	Route in Bosnia-Herzegovina	Route in Montenegro	Status
Metaljka	Čajniče	Metaljka	Pljevlja	R-448	local road	international
Vitine	Foča	Šula	Pljevlja	local road		international
Hum	Foča	Šćepan Polje	Plužine			international
Krstac	Gacko	Krstac	Nikšić	R-432	R-6	local
Biteljica	Bileća	Bituljica	Nikšić	local road	local road	planned
Deleuša	Bileća	Vraćenovići	Nikšić	R-431		international
Klobuk	Trebinje	Ilino Brdo	Nikšić			international
Aranđelovo	Trebinje	Nudo	Nikšić	R-430	P-23	local
Zupci	Trebinje	Sitnica	Herceg Novi	R-429	R-429	international

== See also ==
- Bosnia and Herzegovina–Montenegro relations
