= M-3 highway (Montenegro) =

Highway in Montenegro

M-3 highway
- Magistralni put M-3

Route information
- Part of E-762
- Length: 134 km (83 mi)
- Existed: 1965–present

Major junctions
- North end: M-I-111 E762 in Šćepan Polje (border with Bosnia and Herzegovina)
- R-16 in Plužine; M-6 in Jasenovo Polje; R-7 in Vir; M-7 in Nikšić; R-23 in Cerovo; R-14 in Danilovgrad; M-10 in Podgorica

- South end: M-2 / E-65 / E-80 in Podgorica)

Location
- Country: Montenegro
- Municipalities: Plužine, Nikšić, Danilovgrad, Podgorica

Highway system
- Transport in Montenegro; Motorways
| ← M-2 | → M-4 |

M-3 highway (Montenegrin: Magistralni put M-3) (formerly part of M-18 highway north of Podgorica) is a Montenegrin roadway. It runs concurrently with European route E762.

== History ==
Construction on the M-18 highway finished in 1965. However, asphalt was not applied along the highway until years later.

In January 2016, the Ministry of Transport and Maritime Affairs published bylaw on categorisation of state roads. With new categorisation, M-18 highway was split in two new highways, M-3 highway and M-4 highway.

== Major intersections ==
| Municipality | Location | km | mi | Destinations | Notes |
|---|---|---|---|---|---|
| Plužine | Šćepan Polje | 0.0 | 0.0 | M-I-111 E762 Foča (RS, Bosnia and Herzegovina) | Border crossing with Bosnia and Herzegovina; Northern end of E 762 concurrency |
| Plužine | No settlement in vicinity | 7.2 | 4.5 | Kostova Greda bridge over Piva river | |
| Plužine | Mratinje | 9.9 | 6.2 | Mratinje Dam | |
| Plužine | Near Plužine | 24.1 | 15.0 | R-16 – Trsa, Žabljak | |
| Plužine | Near Plužine | 24.2 | 15.0 | Bridge over Lake Piva | |
| Plužine | Plužine | 25.9 | 16.1 | No major intersection | |
| Nikšić | Jasenovo Polje | 64.6 | 40.1 | M-6 – Šavnik, Žabljak | |
| Nikšić | Vir | 72.5 | 45.0 | R-7 – Gacko (Bosnia and Herzegovina) | |
| Nikšić | Nikšić | 81.6 | 50.7 | M-7 – Vilusi | |
| Nikšić | Cerovo | 95.1 | 59.1 | R-23 – Glava Zete, Danilovgrad | |
| Danilovgrad | Danilovgrad | 114 | 71 | R-14 – Čevo | |
| Podgorica | Podgorica | 131 | 81 | M-10 – Cetinje, Budva | |
| Podgorica | Podgorica | 134 | 83 | M-2 / E-65 / E-80 / E-762 – Petrovac na Moru, Bar, Bijelo Polje | Southern end of E 762 concurrency |
1.000 mi = 1.609 km; 1.000 km = 0.621 mi: Concurrency terminus
