= M-6 highway (Montenegro) =

Highway in Montenegro

M-6 highway
- Magistralni put M-6

Route information
- Length: 127 km (79 mi)
- Existed: 2010–present

Major junctions
- North end: 29 in Ranče (border with Serbia)
- R-11 in Trlica; R-18 in Pljevlja; R-10 in Đurđevića Tara; R-26 in Vrela; R-20 in Virak; R-16 in Pošćenski kraj; R-20 in Šavnik
- South end: M-3 in Jasenovo Polje

Location
- Country: Montenegro
- Municipalities: Pljevlja, Žabljak, Šavnik, Nikšić

Highway system
- Transport in Montenegro; Motorways
← M-5	→ M-7

M-6 highway (Montenegrin: Magistralni put M-6) (previously R-5 and parts of M-8 and R-4) is a Montenegrin roadway.

== History ==
Part of the M-6 highway that was previously M-8 highway was built as part of the larger M-8 highway within the Yugoslav highway network, spanning Bosnia and Herzegovina, Montenegro and Serbia. It connected Pljevlja with Foča in Bosnia and Herzegovina, and Prijepolje, Sjenica and Novi Pazar in Serbia. However, construction was never completed on the Montenegrin section of the road.

Section between Jasenovo Polje and Krnovo was only main road built in Montenegro during 1990s. Section from Žabljak to Šavnik was built in 2010.

In January 2016, the Ministry of Transport and Maritime Affairs published bylaw on categorisation of state roads. With new categorisation, M-6 highway was created, from R-5 regional road and parts of previous M-8 highway and R-4 regional road.

== Major intersections ==
Municipality	Location	km	mi	Destinations	Notes
Pljevlja	Ranče	0.0	0.0	29 – Prijepolje	Border crossing with Serbia
Pljevlja	Trlica	8.6	5.3	R-11 – Bijelo Polje	
Pljevlja	Pljevlja	13.7	8.5	R-3 – Goražde, Priboj	
Pljevlja	Pljevlja	15.3	9.5	R-18 – Šula	
Pljevlja	Đurđevića Tara	50.7	31.5	R-10 – Mojkovac	Immediately after Đurđevića Tara Bridge
Žabljak	Vrela	76.4	47.5	R-26	
Žabljak	Žabljak	71.5	44.4	No major intersection, bypass east of the city	
Žabljak	Virak	76.4	47.5	R-20 – Šavnik	
Žabljak	Pošćenski kraj	79.5	49.4	R-16 – Plužine	
Šavnik	Šavnik	98.4	61.1	R-20 – Žabljak, Kolašin	
Nikšić	Jasenovo Polje	127	79	M-3 – Nikšić, Plužine	
1.000 mi = 1.609 km; 1.000 km = 0.621 mi
