= M-9 highway (Montenegro) =

Highway in Montenegro

M-9 highway
- Magistralni put M-9

Route information
- Length: 21.1 km (13.1 mi)

Major junctions
- South end: M-7 in Vilusi
- North end: R-I-6103 in Deleuša

Location
- Country: Montenegro
- Municipalities: Nikšić

Highway system
- Transport in Montenegro; Motorways
| ← M-8 | → M-10 |

M-9 highway (Montenegrin: Magistralni put M-9) (previously known as R-12 regional road) is a Montenegrin roadway.

== History ==
First section from Vilusi to Petrovići of then R-12 regional road was reconstructed and upgraded in 2012. Second and final section from Petrovići to border crossing Vraćenovići is being reconstructed and should be finished in 2017.

In January 2016, the Ministry of Transport and Maritime Affairs published bylaw on categorisation of state roads. With new categorisation, R-12 regional road was categorised as M-8 highway.

== Major intersections ==
| Municipality | Location | km | mi | Destinations | Notes |
|---|---|---|---|---|---|
| Nikšić | Vilusi | 0.0 | 0.0 | M-7 – Nikšić, Trebinje | |
| Nikšić | Deleuša | 30.6 | 19.0 | R-I-6103 Bileća (RS, Bosnia and Herzegovina) | Vraćenovići border crossing with Bosnia and Herzegovina |
1.000 mi = 1.609 km; 1.000 km = 0.621 mi
