= M-7 highway (Montenegro) =

Highway in Montenegro

M-7 highway
- Magistralni put M-7

Route information
- Length: 35.7 km (22.2 mi)

Major junctions
- East end: M-3 / E-762 in Nikšić

- R-17 in Riđani; M-8 in Vilusi; M-9 in Vilusi
- West end: M-I-118 in Ilino Brdo (border with Bosnia and Herzegovina)

Location
- Country: Montenegro
- Municipalities: Nikšić

Highway system
- Transport in Montenegro; Motorways
← M-6	→ M-8

M-7 highway (Montenegrin: Magistralni put M-7) (previously known as M-6 highway) is a Montenegrin roadway.

== History ==
The M-7, then known as M-6, highway was built in 1981.

It was built as part of the larger M-6 highway within the Yugoslav highway network, spanning Slovenia, Croatia, Bosnia and Herzegovina and Montenegro. It connected Nikšić with Trebinje in Bosnia and Herzegovina; Gospić, Knin and Sinj in Croatia; Škofljica and Kočevje in Slovenia .

Since 2013 sections of the highway have been reconstructed by increasing curve radii and adding third lane on steeper sections. In 2017, 13 kilometers are reconstructed with 3.7 with added third lane.

In January 2016, the Ministry of Transport and Maritime Affairs published bylaw on categorisation of state roads. With new categorisation, M-6 highway was renamed as M-7 highway.

== Major intersections ==
Municipality	Location	km	mi	Destinations	Notes
Nikšić	Nikšić	0.0	0.0	M-3 / E-762 – Plužine, Podgorica	
Nikšić	Riđani	3.5	2.2	R-17 – Čevo, Cetinje, Kotor	
Nikšić	Vilusi	31.2	19.4	M-8 – Grahovo, Risan	
Nikšić	Vilusi	32.4	20.1	M-9 – Bileća (Bosnia and Herzegovina)	
Nikšić	Ilino Brdo	35.7	22.2	M-I-118 Trebinje (RS, Bosnia and Herzegovina)	Border crossing with Bosnia and Herzegovina
1.000 mi = 1.609 km; 1.000 km = 0.621 mi
