= Dučić =

Dučić (Serbian: Дучић) is a Serbian surname and toponym. It may refer to:

- Dučić, Mionica, Serbia
- Jovan Dučić (1871–1943), Bosnian Serb poet, writer
- Nićifor Dučić (1832–1900), Serbian Orthodox clergyman

== See also ==
- Dučice, Montenegro
- Dučići, Bosnia and Herzegovina
