= Heterolatzelia durmitorensis =

Scientific classification
- Kingdom: Animalia
- Phylum: Arthropoda
- Subphylum: Myriapoda
- Class: Diplopoda
- Order: Chordeumatida
- Family: Heterolatzeliidae
- Genus: Heterolatzelia
- Species: H. durmitorensis

Binomial name
- Heterolatzelia durmitorensis Gulička, 1968

Synonyms
- Heterolatzelia cornutum Gulička, 1968

Species of millipede

Heterolatzelia durmitorensis is a species of sausage millipede in the family Heterolatzeliidae. It is found in Montenegro.

== Distribution ==
This species is endemic to Montenegro. Its confirmed range is in the Durmitor National Park and surrounding municipalities like Plužine, Žabljak, Šavnik and Nikšić.
