= R-10 regional road (Montenegro) =

Road in Montenegro

R-10 regional road
- Regionalni put R-10

Route information
- Length: 45.9 km (28.5 mi)

Major junctions
- West end: M-6 in Đurđevića Tara
- East end: M-2 in Mojkovac

Location
- Country: Montenegro
- Municipalities: Pljevlja, Žabljak, Mojkovac

Highway system
- Transport in Montenegro; Motorways
← R-9	→ R-11

R-10 regional road (Montenegrin: Regionalni put R-10) (previously known as R-4 regional road) is a Montenegrin roadway.

It serves as a connection between M-2 and M-6 highways. Route of the road starts near Đurđevića Tara Bridge and then follows Tara river up to Mojkovac.

== History ==
In January 2016, the Ministry of Transport and Maritime Affairs published bylaw on categorisation of state roads. With new categorisation, R-4 regional road was renamed as R-10 regional road.

== Major intersections ==
Municipality	Location	km	mi	Destinations	Notes
Pljevlja	Đurđevića Tara	0.0	0.0	M-6 – Pljevlja, Žabljak	Near Đurđevića Tara Bridge
Mojkovac	Mojkovac	45.9	28.5	M-2 – Mojkovac, Kolašin, Bijelo Polje	
1.000 mi = 1.609 km; 1.000 km = 0.621 mi
