= M-8 highway (Montenegro) =

Highway in Montenegro

M-8 highway
- Magistralni put M-8

Route information
- Length: 38.6 km (24.0 mi)
- Existed: 2010–present

Major junctions
- South end: M-1 / E-65 / E-80 in Lipci
- R-8 in Grahovo
- North end: M-7 in Vilusi

Location
- Country: Montenegro
- Municipalities: Herceg Novi, Kotor, Nikšić

Highway system
- Transport in Montenegro; Motorways
← M-7	→ M-9

M-8 highway (Montenegrin: Magistralni put M-8) (previously known as R-11 regional road) is a Montenegrin roadway.

== History ==
The R-11 regional road on this route was built in 2010.

In January 2016, the Ministry of Transport and Maritime Affairs published bylaw on categorisation of state roads. With new categorisation, R-11 regional road was categorised as M-8 highway.

== Major intersections ==
Municipality	Location	km	mi	Destinations	Notes
Herceg Novi	Lipci	0.0	0.0	M-1 / E-65 / E-80 – Herceg Novi, Risan, Kotor	
Nikšić	Grahovo	25.7	16.0	R-8 regional road passes under M-8 and are connected via short municipal road	
Nikšić	Vilusi	38.6	24.0	M-7 – Nikšić, Trebinje	
1.000 mi = 1.609 km; 1.000 km = 0.621 mi
