= R-18 regional road (Montenegro) =

Road in Montenegro

R-18 regional road
- Regionalni put R-18

Route information
- Length: 34.2 km (21.3 mi)

Major junctions
- East end: M-6 in Pljevlja
- West end: R-II-5511 in Šula

Location
- Country: Montenegro
- Municipalities: Pljevlja

Highway system
- Transport in Montenegro; Motorways
← R-17	→ R-19

R-18 regional road (Montenegrin: Regionalni put R-18) (previously part of M-8 highway) is a Montenegrin roadway.

== History ==
M-6 highway was built as part of the larger M-8 highway within the Yugoslav highway network, spanning Bosnia and Herzegovina, Montenegro and Serbia. It connected Pljevlja with Foča in Bosnia and Herzegovina, and Prijepolje, Sjenica and Novi Pazar in Serbia. However, construction was never completed on the Montenegrin section of the road.

In January 2016, the Ministry of Transport and Maritime Affairs published bylaw on categorisation of state roads. With new categorisation, part of M-8 highway (west of Pljevlja) was downgraded to regional road and named as R-18 regional road.

== Major intersections ==
Municipality	Location	km	mi	Destinations	Notes
Pljevlja	Pljevlja	0.0	0.0	M-6 – Žabljak, Prijepolje in Serbia	
Pljevlja	Gradac	23.4	14.5	No major intersection	
Pljevlja	Šula	34.4	21.4		
Pljevlja	Šula	38.5	23.9	R-II-5511 Foča (RS, Bosnia and Herzegovina)	Border crossing with Bosnia and Herzegovina
1.000 mi = 1.609 km; 1.000 km = 0.621 mi
