= R-23 regional road (Montenegro) =

Road in Montenegro

R-23 regional road
- Regionalni put R-23

Route information
- Length: 40.5 km (25.2 mi)

Major junctions
- North end: M-3 in Cerovo
- South end: Rogami

Location
- Country: Montenegro
- Municipalities: Nikšić, Danilovgrad, Podgorica

Highway system
- Transport in Montenegro; Motorways
← R-22	→ R-24

R-23 regional road (Montenegrin: Regionalni put R-23) is a Montenegrin roadway.

== History ==
In January 2016, the Ministry of Transport and Maritime Affairs published bylaw on categorisation of state roads. With new categorisation, R-23 was created from several municipal roads.

== Major intersections ==
Municipality	Location	km	mi	Destinations	Notes
Nikšić	Cerovo	0.0	0.0	M-3 – Nikšić, Danilovgrad	
Nikšić	Bogetići	0.5	0.31	No major intersection	
Nikšić	Glava Zete	7.9	4.9	No major intersection	
Danilovgrad	Danilovgrad	23.9	14.9	No major intersection, M-3 is less than 1 km away	
Danilovgrad	Spuž	33.7	20.9	No major intersection	
Podgorica	Rogami	40.5	25.2	No major intersection	
1.000 mi = 1.609 km; 1.000 km = 0.621 mi
