= R-16 regional road (Montenegro) =

Road in Montenegro

R-16 regional road
- Regionalni put R-16

Route information
- Length: 44.7 km (27.8 mi)

Major junctions
- East end: M-3 in Plužine
- West end: M-6 in Pošćenski Kraj

Location
- Country: Montenegro
- Municipalities: Plužine, Žabljak

Highway system
- Transport in Montenegro; Motorways
← R-15	→ R-17

R-16 regional road (Montenegrin: Regionalni put R-16) (previously known as R-14 regional road) is a Montenegrin roadway.

It serves as an alternative connection between Plužine and Žabljak.

== History ==
In January 2016, the Ministry of Transport and Maritime Affairs published bylaw on categorisation of state roads. With new categorisation, R-14 regional road was renamed as R-16 regional road.

== Major intersections ==
Municipality	Location	km	mi	Destinations	Notes
Plužine	Plužine	0.0	0.0	M-3 – Plužine, Foča (Bosnia and Hercegovina)	
Plužine	Trsa	11.4	7.1	No major intersection	
Žabljak	Pošćenski Kraj	44.7	27.8	M-6 – Žabljak, Šavnik	
1.000 mi = 1.609 km; 1.000 km = 0.621 mi
