= R-17 regional road (Montenegro) =

Road in Montenegro

R-17 regional road
- Regionalni put R-17

Route information
- Length: 58 km (36 mi)

Major junctions
- South end: R-1 in Čekanje
- R-8 in Resna; R-14 in Čevo
- North end: M-7 in Riđani

Location
- Country: Montenegro
- Municipalities: Cetinje, Nikšić

Highway system
- Transport in Montenegro; Motorways
← R-16	→ R-18

R-17 regional road (Montenegrin: Regionalni put R-17) (previously known as R-15 regional road) is a Montenegrin roadway.

== History ==
In January 2016, the Ministry of Transport and Maritime Affairs published bylaw on categorisation of state roads. With new categorisation, R-15 regional road was renamed as R-17 regional road.

== Major intersections ==
Municipality	Location	km	mi	Destinations	Notes
Cetinje	Čekanje	0.0	0.0	R-1 – Cetinje, Kotor	
Cetinje	Resna	10.5	6.5	R-8 – Grahovo	
Cetinje	Čevo	19.7	12.2	R-14 – Danilovgrad	
Nikšić	Riđani	58.0	36.0	M-7 – Nikšić, Trebinje (Bosnia and Herzegovina)	
1.000 mi = 1.609 km; 1.000 km = 0.621 mi
