= R-8 regional road (Montenegro) =

Road in Montenegro

R-8 regional road
- Regionalni put R-8

Route information
- Length: 50.9 km (31.6 mi)

Major junctions
- East end: R-17 in Resna
- West end: R-430 in Nudo

Location
- Country: Montenegro
- Municipalities: Cetinje, Nikšić

Highway system
- Transport in Montenegro; Motorways
← R-7	→ R-9

R-8 regional road (Montenegrin: Regionalni put R-8) (previously known as R-23 regional road) is a Montenegrin roadway.

== History ==
In January 2016, the Ministry of Transport and Maritime Affairs published bylaw on categorisation of state roads. With this bylaw R-23 regional road was renamed as R-8 regional road.

== Major intersections ==
Municipality	Location	km	mi	Destinations	Notes
Cetinje	Resna	0.0	0.0	R-17 – Cetinje, Nikšić, Kotor, Danilovgrad	
Nikšić	Grahovo	33.8	21.0	M-8 highway passes over R-8 regional road and are connected via short local road	
Nikšić	Nudo, Nikšić	50.9	31.6	R-430 – Trebinje (Bosnia and Herzegovina)	Border crossing with Bosnia and Herzegovina
1.000 mi = 1.609 km; 1.000 km = 0.621 mi
