= R-7 regional road (Montenegro) =

Road in Montenegro

R-7 regional road
- Regionalni put R-7

Route information
- Length: 42.8 km (26.6 mi)

Major junctions
- South-East end: M-3 in Vir
- North-West end: R-II-6501 in Krstac

Location
- Country: Montenegro
- Municipalities: Nikšić

Highway system
- Transport in Montenegro; Motorways
← R-6	→ R-8

R-7 regional road (Montenegrin: Regionalni put R-7) (previously known as R-6 regional road) is a Montenegrin roadway.

It serves as extension of M-3 highway, and is a connection between Nikšić and Gacko, Bosnia and Herzegovina.

== History ==
In January 2016, the Ministry of Transport and Maritime Affairs published bylaw on categorisation of state roads. With this bylaw R-6 regional road was shortened on south-east side for around 2 kilometers to start at new route of M-3 highway, and was renamed as R-7 regional road.

== Major intersections ==
Municipality	Location	km	mi	Destinations	Notes
Nikšić	Vir	0.0	0.0	M-5 – Berane, Novi Pazar (Serbia)	
Nikšić	Krstac	42.8	26.6	R-II-6501 Gacko (RS, Bosnia and Herzegovina)	Border crossing with Bosnia and Herzegovina
1.000 mi = 1.609 km; 1.000 km = 0.621 mi
