= Klenak =

Klenak may refer to:

- Klenak, Nikšić, Montenegro
- Klenak, Ruma, Serbia
- Klenak, a neighbourhood of Kaluđerica, Serbia
