= Tupan =

Tupan may refer to:

- Tǔpan, a double-headed drum
- Tupã (mythology), the thunder god of the Tupi and Guaraní people of Brazil
- Tupan, Nikšić, Montenegro
- Tupan Patera, a volcano on Io
