= Šaulić =

Šaulić is a Serbian surname and family with origin in Old Herzegovina, subfamily of the Jakšić of Drobnjaci clan.

== Notable people ==
- Jelena Šaulić, Montenegrin teacher
- Šaban Šaulić, Serbian musician
