= R-11 regional road (Montenegro) =

Road in Montenegro

R-11 regional road
- Regionalni put R-11

Route information
- Length: 65.5 km (40.7 mi)

Major junctions
- East end: M-2 in Slijepač Most
- West end: M-6 in Trlica

Location
- Country: Montenegro
- Municipalities: Pljevlja, Bijelo Polje

Highway system
- Transport in Montenegro; Motorways
← R-10	→ R-12

R-11 regional road (Montenegrin: Regionalni put R-11) (previously known as R-10 regional road) is a Montenegrin roadway.

It serves as a connection between M-2 and M-6 highways, and also is shortest connection between Bijelo Polje and Pljevlja

== History ==
In January 2016, the Ministry of Transport and Maritime Affairs published bylaw on categorisation of state roads. With new categorisation, R-10 regional road was renamed as R-11 regional road.

== Major intersections ==
Municipality	Location	km	mi	Destinations	Notes
Bijelo Polje	Slijepač Most	0.0	0.0	M-2 – Bijelo Polje, Mojkovac	
Bijelo Polje	Tomaševo	11.0	6.8	No major intersection	
Bijelo Polje	Pavino Polje	19.7	12.2	No major intersection	
Pljevlja	Trlica	65.5	40.7	M-6 – Pljevlja, Žabljak	
1.000 mi = 1.609 km; 1.000 km = 0.621 mi
