= R23 =

R23 or R-23 may refer to:

== Military ==
- R-23 (missile), a Soviet air-to-air missile
- HMS Teazer (R23), a destroyer of the Royal Navy
- Rikhter R-23, a Soviet aircraft autocannon
- USS R-23 (SS-100), a submarine of the United States Navy

== Roads ==
- R23 road (Belgium)
- R-23 regional road (Montenegro)
- R23 highway (Russia)
- R23 (South Africa)

== Other uses ==
- R23: Toxic by inhalation, a risk phrase
- Fluoroform, a refrigerant
- Kwambi dialect
- Renault R23, a Formule One racing car
- Rubik R-23 Gébics, a Hungarian training glider
