= R26 =

R26 or R-26 may refer to:

== Roads ==
- R-26 regional road (Montenegro)
- R26 (South Africa)

== Formula One cars ==
- Audi R26, a 2026 Formula One race car
- Renault R26, a 2006 Formula One race car

== Other uses ==
- R-26 (missile), a Soviet intercontinental ballistic missile
- R26 (New York City Subway car)
- R-26 (salon), an artistic salon in Paris
- British Airship R.26, a training airship
- HMS Comet (R26), a destroyer of the Royal Navy
- R26: Very toxic by inhalation, a risk phrase
- Rubik R-26 Góbé, a Hungarian training glider
- USS R-26 (SS-103), a submarine of the United States Navy
