= R-26 regional road (Montenegro) =

Road in Montenegro

R-26 regional road
- Regionalni put R-26

Route information
- Length: 2.4 km (1.5 mi)

Major junctions
- North end: M-6 in Vrela
- South end: Njegovuđa

Location
- Country: Montenegro
- Municipalities: Žabljak

Highway system
- Transport in Montenegro; Motorways
← R-25.1	→ R-27

R-26 regional road (Montenegrin: Regionalni put R-26) is a Montenegrin roadway.

== History ==
In November 2019, the Government of Montenegro published bylaw on categorisation of state roads. With new categorisation, R-25 regional road was created from municipal road.

== Major intersections ==
Municipality	Location	km	mi	Destinations	Notes
Žabljak	Vrela, Žabljak	0.0	0.0	M-6 – Žabljak, Pljevlja	
Žabljak	Njegovuđa	2.4	1.5		
1.000 mi = 1.609 km; 1.000 km = 0.621 mi
