= Vasiljevići =

Vasiljevići may refer to:

- Vasiljevići, Nikšić, Montenegro
- Vasiljevići (Ivanjica), Serbia
