= R-14 regional road (Montenegro) =

Road in Montenegro

R-14 regional road
- Regionalni put R-14

Route information
- Length: 26 km (16 mi)

Major junctions
- East end: M-3 in Danilovgrad
- West end: R-17 in Čevo

Location
- Country: Montenegro
- Municipalities: Danilovgrad, Cetinje

Highway system
- Transport in Montenegro; Motorways
← R-13	→ R-15

R-14 regional road (Montenegrin: Regionalni put R-14) (previously part of R-23 regional road) is a Montenegrin roadway.

== History ==
In January 2016, the Ministry of Transport and Maritime Affairs published bylaw on categorisation of state roads. With new categorisation, R-23 regional road was split and part of it was renamed as R-14 regional road.

== Major intersections ==
Municipality	Location	km	mi	Destinations	Notes
Danilovgrad	Danilovgrad	0.0	0.0	M-3 – Podgorica, Nikšić	
Cetinje	Čevo	26.0	16.2	R-17 – Cetinje, Nikšić, Kotor	
1.000 mi = 1.609 km; 1.000 km = 0.621 mi
