= Zagrad =

Zagrad is a place name that may refer to:

Bosnia and Herzegovina

- Zagrad, Velika Kladuša, a village in the Municipality of Velika Kladuša, northwestern Bosnia and Herzegovina

Croatia

- Zagrad, Benkovac, a village in the Municipality of Benkovac, County of Zadar

Macedonia

- Zagrad, Makedonski Brod, a village in Makedonski Brod Municipality, western Macedonia

Montenegro

- Zagrad, Berane Municipality, a village in the Municipality of Berane
- Zagrad, Nikšić, a village in the Municipality of Nikšić

Slovenia

- Zagrad, Celje, a former village in central-eastern Slovenia, now part of the town of Celje
- Zagrad, Prevalje, a village in the Municipality of Domžale, central Slovenia
- Zagrad, Radeče, a village in the Municipality of Kostanjevica na Krki, southeastern Slovenia
- Zagrad, Škocjan, a village in the Municipality of Škocjan, southeastern Slovenia
- Zagrad pri Otočcu, a village in the Municipality of Dol pri Ljubljani, central Slovenia
- Zaboršt pri Šentvidu, a village in the Municipality of Ivančna Gorica, southeastern Slovenia
