= Brezovik =

Brezovik Брезовик
- Village
- Location within Montenegro
- Coordinates: 42.818760°N 18.927857°E
- Country: Montenegro
- Municipality: Nikšić

Population (2011)
  - Total: 312
- Time zone: UTC+1 (CET)
  - Summer (DST): UTC+2 (CEST)

Brezovik (Serbian Cyrillic: Брезовик) is a village in the municipality of Nikšić, Montenegro.

== Demographics ==
According to the 2011 census, its population was 312.

Ethnicity in 2011
Ethnicity	Number	Percentage
Montenegrins	196	62.8%
Serbs	87	27.9%
other/undeclared	29	9.3%
Total	312	100%
