= Rastovac, Nikšić =

Rastovac Растовац
- Town
- Location within Montenegro
- Coordinates: 42°50′05″N 18°56′25″E
- Country: Montenegro
- Municipality: Nikšić

Population (2011)
  - Total: 1,535
- Time zone: UTC+1 (CET)
  - Summer (DST): UTC+2 (CEST)

Rastovac (Serbian Cyrillic: Растовац) is a small town in the municipality of Nikšić, Montenegro.

== Demographics ==
According to the 2003 census, the town has a population of 1,513 people.

According to the 2011 census, its population was 1,535.

Ethnicity in 2011
Ethnicity	Number	Percentage
Montenegrins	1,025	66.8%
Serbs	381	24.8%
other/undeclared	129	8.4%
Total	1,535	100%
