= Massarilatzelia =

Scientific classification
- Kingdom: Animalia
- Phylum: Arthropoda
- Subphylum: Myriapoda
- Class: Diplopoda
- Order: Chordeumatida
- Family: Heterolatzeliidae
- Genus: Massarilatzelia; Makarov & Rađa, 2011
- Species: M. dugopoljica

Binomial name
- Massarilatzelia dugopoljica Makarov & Rađa, 2011

Genus of millipedes

Massarilatzelia is a monotypic genus of sausage millipedes in the family Heterolatzeliidae, containing the single species Massarilatzelia dugopoljica . It was first described by Makarov & Rađa in 2011, and has only been found in Croatia.
