= Carine, Nikšić =

Carine Царине
- Village
- Location within Montenegro
- Coordinates: 42.728605°N 18.604381°E
- Country: Montenegro
- Municipality: Nikšić

Population (2011)
  - Total: 187
- Time zone: UTC+1 (CET)
  - Summer (DST): UTC+2 (CEST)

Carine (Serbian Cyrillic: Царине) is a village in the municipality of Nikšić, Montenegro. It is located close to the Bosnian border.

== Demographics ==
According to the 2011 census, its population was 187.

Ethnicity in 2011
Ethnicity	Number	Percentage
Serbs	102	54.5%
Montenegrins	73	39.0%
other/undeclared	12	6.4%
Total	187	100%
