= R-25.1 regional road (Montenegro) =

Road in Montenegro

R-25.1 regional road
- Regionalni put R-25.1

Route information
- Length: 3 km (1.9 mi)

Major junctions
- West end: R-25 in Međuvršje
- East end: Lovćen

Location
- Country: Montenegro
- Municipalities: Cetinje

Highway system
- Transport in Montenegro; Motorways
← R-25	→ R-26

R-25.1 regional road (Montenegrin: Regionalni put R-25.1) is a Montenegrin roadway. It serves as a connection from R-25 regional road to bottom of the stairs that lead to top of Lovćen and Mausoleum of Njegoš.

== History ==
In November 2019, the Government of Montenegro published bylaw on categorisation of state roads. With new categorisation, R-25.1 regional road was created from municipal road.

== Major intersections ==
Municipality	Location	km	mi	Destinations	Notes
Cetinje	Međuvršje	0	0.0	R-25 – Cetinje, Kotor	
Cetinje	Lovćen	3	1.9		
1.000 mi = 1.609 km; 1.000 km = 0.621 mi
