= Bastaji, Nikšić =

Bastaji Бастаји
- Village
- Location within Montenegro
- Coordinates: 42°44′10″N 19°05′05″E
- Country: Montenegro
- Municipality: Nikšić

Population (2023)
  - Total: 84
- Time zone: UTC+1 (CET)
  - Summer (DST): UTC+2 (CEST)

Bastaji (Serbian Cyrillic: Бастаји) is a small village in the municipality of Nikšić, Montenegro.

== Demographics ==
As of the 2023 census, the population had decreased to 84, down from 172 in 2011.

Ethnicity in 2023
Ethnicity	Number	Percentage
Montenegrins	51	60.7%
Serbs	29	34.5%
other/undeclared	4	4.7%
Total	84	100%

Ethnicity in 2011
Ethnicity	Number	Percentage
Montenegrins	92	53.5%
Serbs	65	37.8%
other/undeclared	15	8.7%
Total	172	100%
