= Dragovoljići =

Dragovoljići Драговољићи
- Village
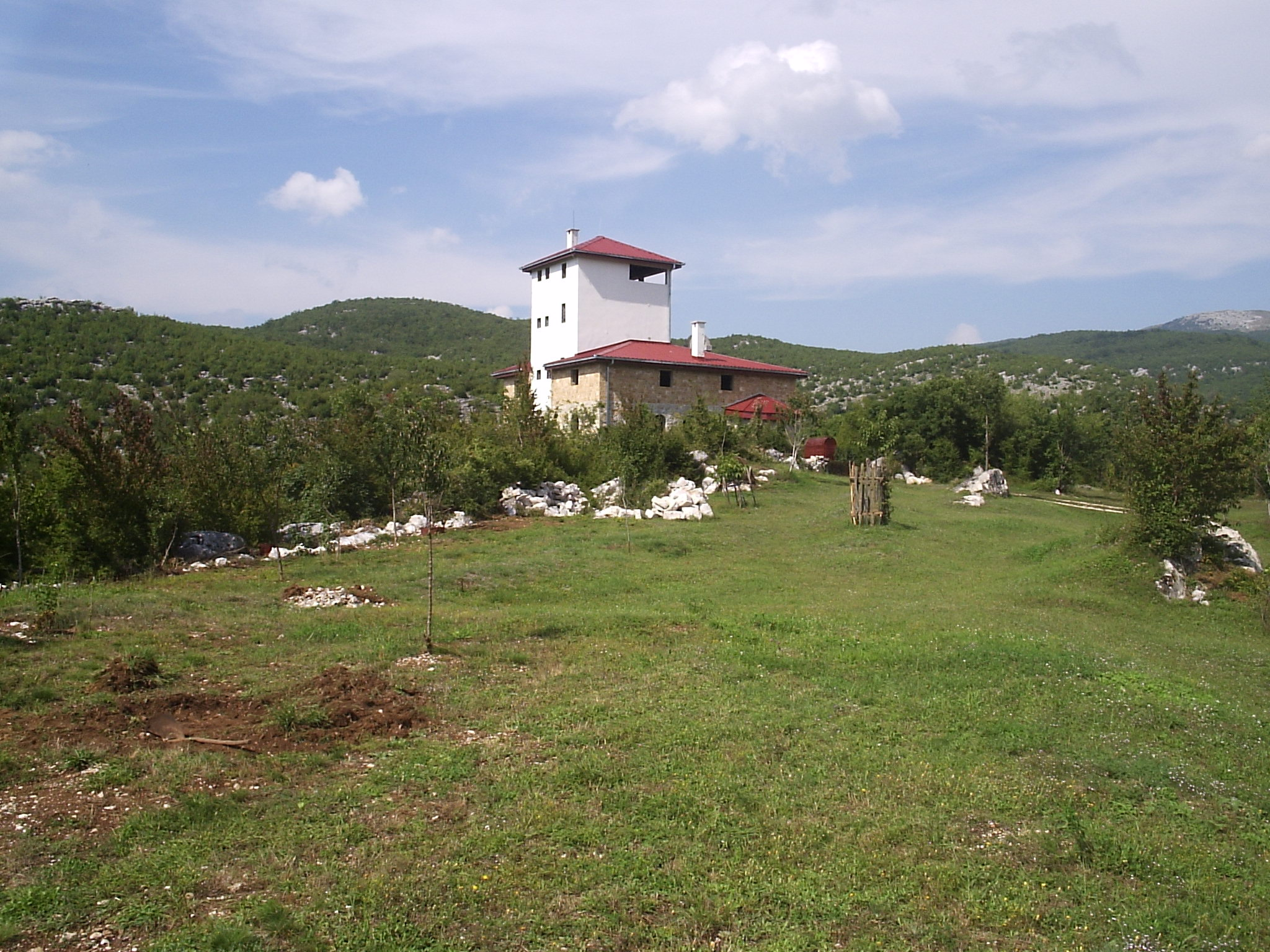
- village in the municipality of Nikšić, Montenegro

- Location within Montenegro
- Coordinates: 42.772849°N 19.042987°E
- Country: Montenegro
- Municipality: Nikšić

Population (2011)
  - Total: 370
- Time zone: UTC+1 (CET)
  - Summer (DST): UTC+2 (CEST)

Dragovoljići (Serbian Cyrillic: Драговољићи) is a village in the municipality of Nikšić, Montenegro.

== Demographics ==
According to the 2011 census, its population was 370.

Ethnicity in 2011
Ethnicity	Number	Percentage
Montenegrins	189	51.1%
Serbs	156	42.2%
other/undeclared	25	6.8%
Total	370	100%
