= Staro Selo, Nikšić =

Staro Selo Старо Село
- Village
- Location within Montenegro
- Coordinates: 42.718782°N 19.106360°E
- Country: Montenegro
- Municipality: Nikšić

Population (2011)
  - Total: 323
- Time zone: UTC+1 (CET)
  - Summer (DST): UTC+2 (CEST)

Staro Selo (Serbian Cyrillic: Старо Село) is a village in the municipality of Nikšić, Montenegro.

== Demographics ==
According to the 2011 census, its population was 323.

Ethnicity in 2011
Ethnicity	Number	Percentage
Montenegrins	175	54.2%
Serbs	116	35.9%
other/undeclared	32	9.9%
Total	323	100%
