= Laz, Nikšić =

Laz Лаз
- Village
- Location within Montenegro
- Coordinates: 42°45′22″N 19°02′16″E
- Country: Montenegro
- Municipality: Nikšić

Population (2011)
  - Total: 135
- Time zone: UTC+1 (CET)
  - Summer (DST): UTC+2 (CEST)

Laz (Serbian Cyrillic: Лаз) is a village in the municipality of Nikšić, Montenegro.

== Demographics ==
According to the 2011 census, its population was 135.

Ethnicity in 2011
Ethnicity	Number	Percentage
Montenegrins	95	70.4%
Serbs	37	27.4%
other/undeclared	3	2.2%
Total	135	100%
