= Žabljak Airport =

Žabljak Airport Aerodrom Žabljak
- IATA: ZBK; ICAO: none

Summary
- Airport type: Non-towered airport
- Operator: N/A
- Location: Žabljak, Montenegro
- Elevation AMSL: 4,252 ft / 1,296 m
- Coordinates: 43°7′0″N 19°14′0″E
- Interactive map of Žabljak Airport

Runways
Direction	Length		Surface
Direction	ft	m	Surface
16/34	4,429	1,350	Grass

Žabljak Airport (Montenegrin: Аеродром Жабљак / Aerodrom Žabljak) was an airport in the Žabljak Municipality in Montenegro. It was used for general aviation and cannot handle larger aircraft.

== History ==
At the end of 1955, JAT Yugoslav Airlines opened the Belgrade–Žabljak line with a Douglas DC-3 airliner.

The airport closed in 1968.

== See also ==
- de Havilland Canada DHC-6 Twin Otter
