= Podbožur =

Podbožur Подбожур
- Village
- Location within Montenegro
- Coordinates: 42.73722°N 18.68806°E
- Country: Montenegro
- Municipality: Nikšić

Population (2003)
  - Total: 17
- Time zone: UTC+1 (CET)
  - Summer (DST): UTC+2 (CEST)

Podbožur (Serbian Cyrillic: Подбожур) is a village in the municipality of Nikšić, in the west of Montenegro. Its population dropped from 222 to only 17 persons, between 1961 and 2003.

== Demographics ==
Historical population

Year	Pop.	±%
1948	200	—
1953	204	+2.0%
1961	222	+8.8%
1971	140	−36.9%

Year	Pop.	±%
1981	135	−3.6%
1991	61	−54.8%
2003	17	−72.1%
