= Štedim =

Štedim Штедим
- Village
- Location within Montenegro
- Coordinates: 42.772572°N 18.902773°E
- Country: Montenegro
- Municipality: Nikšić

Population (2011)
  - Total: 147
- Time zone: UTC+1 (CET)
  - Summer (DST): UTC+2 (CEST)

Štedim (Serbian Cyrillic: Штедим) is a village in the municipality of Nikšić, Montenegro.It lies not far from the city of Nikšić and nearby localities like Vitalac and Kapino Polje. The approximate coordinates are 42.7726° N, 18.9028° E.

    - Infrastructure: Štedim is a small rural settlement typical of the region, characterized by traditional village life.

== Demographics ==
According to the 2011 census, its population was 147.

Ethnicity in 2011
| Ethnicity | Number | Percentage |
|---|---|---|
| Montenegrins | 95 | 64.6% |
| Serbs | 34 | 23.1% |
| other/undeclared | 18 | 12.2% |
| Total | 147 | 100% |
