= Crnodoli =

Crnodoli Црнодоли
- Village
- Location within Montenegro
- Coordinates: 42.791709°N 18.876841°E
- Country: Montenegro
- Municipality: Nikšić

Population (2011)
  - Total: 117
- Time zone: UTC+1 (CET)
  - Summer (DST): UTC+2 (CEST)

Crnodoli (Serbian Cyrillic: Црнодоли) is a village in the municipality of Nikšić, Montenegro.

== Demographics ==
According to the 2011 census, its population was 117.

Ethnicity in 2011
Ethnicity	Number	Percentage
Montenegrins	91	77.8%
Serbs	16	13.7%
other/undeclared	10	8.5%
Total	117	100%
