= Miločani =

Miločani Милочани
- Village
- Location within Montenegro
- Coordinates: 42.828837°N 18.904560°E
- Country: Montenegro
- Municipality: Nikšić

Population (2011)
  - Total: 1,006
- Time zone: UTC+1 (CET)
  - Summer (DST): UTC+2 (CEST)

Miločani (Serbian Cyrillic: Милочани) is a village in the municipality of Nikšić, Montenegro.

== Demographics ==
According to the 2011 census, its population was 1,006.

Ethnicity in 2011
Ethnicity	Number	Percentage
Montenegrins	593	58.9%
Serbs	311	30.9%
other/undeclared	102	10.1%
Total	1,006	100%
