= Koprivice =

Koprivice Копривице
- Village
- Location within Montenegro
- Coordinates: 42.903646°N 18.595411°E
- Country: Montenegro
- Municipality: Nikšić

Population (2011)
  - Total: 117
- Time zone: UTC+1 (CET)
  - Summer (DST): UTC+2 (CEST)

Koprivice (Serbian Cyrillic: Копривице) is a village in the municipality of Nikšić, Montenegro.

== Demographics ==
According to the 2011 census, its population was 117.

Ethnicity in 2011
Ethnicity	Number	Percentage
Serbs	63	53.8%
Montenegrins	48	41.0%
other/undeclared	25	6.8%
Total	117	100%
