= Heterolatzelia =

Scientific classification
- Kingdom: Animalia
- Phylum: Arthropoda
- Subphylum: Myriapoda
- Class: Diplopoda
- Order: Chordeumatida
- Family: Heterolatzeliidae
- Genus: Heterolatzelia; Verhoeff, 1897

Type species
- Heterolatzelia nivalis

Genus of millipedes

Heterolatzelia is a genus of sausage millipede in the family Heterolatzeliidae found in Balkans.

== Systematics ==
Genus Heterolatzelia consists of 3 species:

Heterolatzelia durmitorensis Gulicka, 1968 (Montenegro)

Heterolatzelia karlstrasseri Antć & Makarov, 2015 (Bosnia and Hercegovina)

Heterolatzelia nivalis Verhoeff, 1897 (Bosnia and Hercegovina)

Heterolatzelia nivalis absoloni Attems, 1951

Heterolatzelia nivalis nivalis Verhoeff, 1897

Heterolatzelia nivalis rupivaga Verhoeff, 1899
