= Jugovići, Nikšić =

Jugovići Југовићи
- Village
- Location within Montenegro
- Coordinates: 42.721294°N 19.091903°E
- Country: Montenegro
- Municipality: Nikšić

Population (2011)
  - Total: 233
- Time zone: UTC+1 (CET)
  - Summer (DST): UTC+2 (CEST)

Jugovići (Serbian Cyrillic: Југовићи) is a village in the municipality of Nikšić, Montenegro.

== Demographics ==
According to the 2011 census, its population was 233.

Ethnicity in 2011
Ethnicity	Number	Percentage
Montenegrins	130	55.8%
Serbs	64	27.5%
other/undeclared	39	16.7%
Total	233	100%
