= Vasilija Vukotić =

Vasilija Vukotić (Serbian Cyrillic: Василија Вукотић; (1897–1970) was a Serbian from Montenegro military ordonance and a daughter of the Serdar Janko Vukotić, accompanying her father in the armies of the Principality and Kingdom of Montenegro throughout the battles in the Balkan Wars and World War I. She was and remains a heroine and a role model for the participation of Montenegrin women in all wars for the liberation of the Serbian people from the occupiers. In the newly established state of Serb Croats and Slovenes, her role and significance, as the role and significance of her father, were completely suppressed.

== Biography ==
Vasilija Vukotić was born in Čevo in 1897. She was the only daughter and the eldest of two children of Serdar Janko Vukotić. Belonging to the Vukotić brotherhood, she was related to Petar and Milena Vukotić. She took part in the First Balkan War, the Second Balkan War, and World War I, until the fall of the Montenegrin army and state in 1916. She was the only woman to participate in the Battle of Mojkovac. When World War I broke out, Vasilija’s brother Vukašin, who was twelve years her junior, was not yet old enough to fight. As Vasilija already had some military experience, her father gave her the rank of corporal. She personally transmitted his orders to military units and their commanders. As she was the only woman, and none other than the Serdar’s daughter, she was well-loved by the soldiers, especially for her daring, honor and courage. She took part in the Battle of Mojkovac, in which the Montenegrin army defended the retreat of the Serbian army, moving towards northern Albania. Having survived the battle, she left a detailed account of the moments of heroism and tragedy: “If it were not for that bloody Christmas at Mojkovac, there would not have been Easter in Kajmakchalan. Had it not been for the Montenegrin eagles, those young men, who scorned death and closed the doors of Mojkovac with their own bosoms and stopped the enemy army from reaching the Serbian rear, perhaps the fate of the Serbs would have been sealed for good…” She died in Belgrade in 1970.
