= Šipačno, Nikšić =

Šipačno Шипачно
- Village
- Location within Montenegro
- Coordinates: 42°52′15″N 18°56′35″E
- Country: Montenegro
- Municipality: Nikšić

Population (2011)
  - Total: 237
- Time zone: UTC+1 (CET)
  - Summer (DST): UTC+2 (CEST)

Šipačno (Montenegrin Cyrillic: Шипачно) is a village in the municipality of Nikšić, Montenegro.

== Demographics ==
According to the 2011 census, its population was 237.

Ethnicity in 2011
Ethnicity	Number	Percentage
Montenegrins	164	69.2%
Serbs	59	24.9%
other/undeclared	14	5.9%
Total	237	100%
