= Kuta, Nikšić =

Kuta Кута
- Village
- Location within Montenegro
- Coordinates: 42.739350°N 19.117091°E
- Country: Montenegro
- Municipality: Nikšić

Population (2011)
  - Total: 846
- Time zone: UTC+1 (CET)
  - Summer (DST): UTC+2 (CEST)

Kuta (Serbian Cyrillic: Кута) is a village in the municipality of Nikšić, Montenegro.

== Demographics ==
According to the 2011 census, its population was 846.

Ethnicity in 2011
Ethnicity	Number	Percentage
Montenegrins	600	70.9%
Serbs	165	19.5%
other/undeclared	81	9.6%
Total	846	100%
