= Morakovo =

Morakovo Мораково
- Village
- Location within Montenegro
- Coordinates: 42.716554°N 19.157074°E
- Country: Montenegro
- Municipality: Nikšić

Population (2011)
  - Total: 336
- Time zone: UTC+1 (CET)
  - Summer (DST): UTC+2 (CEST)

Morakovo (Serbian Cyrillic: Мораково) is a village in the municipality of Nikšić, Montenegro.

== Demographics ==
According to the 2011 census, its population was 336.

Ethnicity in 2011
Ethnicity	Number	Percentage
Montenegrins	215	64.0%
Serbs	97	28.9%
other/undeclared	24	7.1%
Total	336	100%
