= Gornje Polje =

Gornje Polje Горње Поље
- Village
- Location within Montenegro
- Coordinates: 42.657840°N 18.647368°E
- Country: Montenegro
- Municipality: Nikšić

Population (2011)
  - Total: 168
- Time zone: UTC+1 (CET)
  - Summer (DST): UTC+2 (CEST)

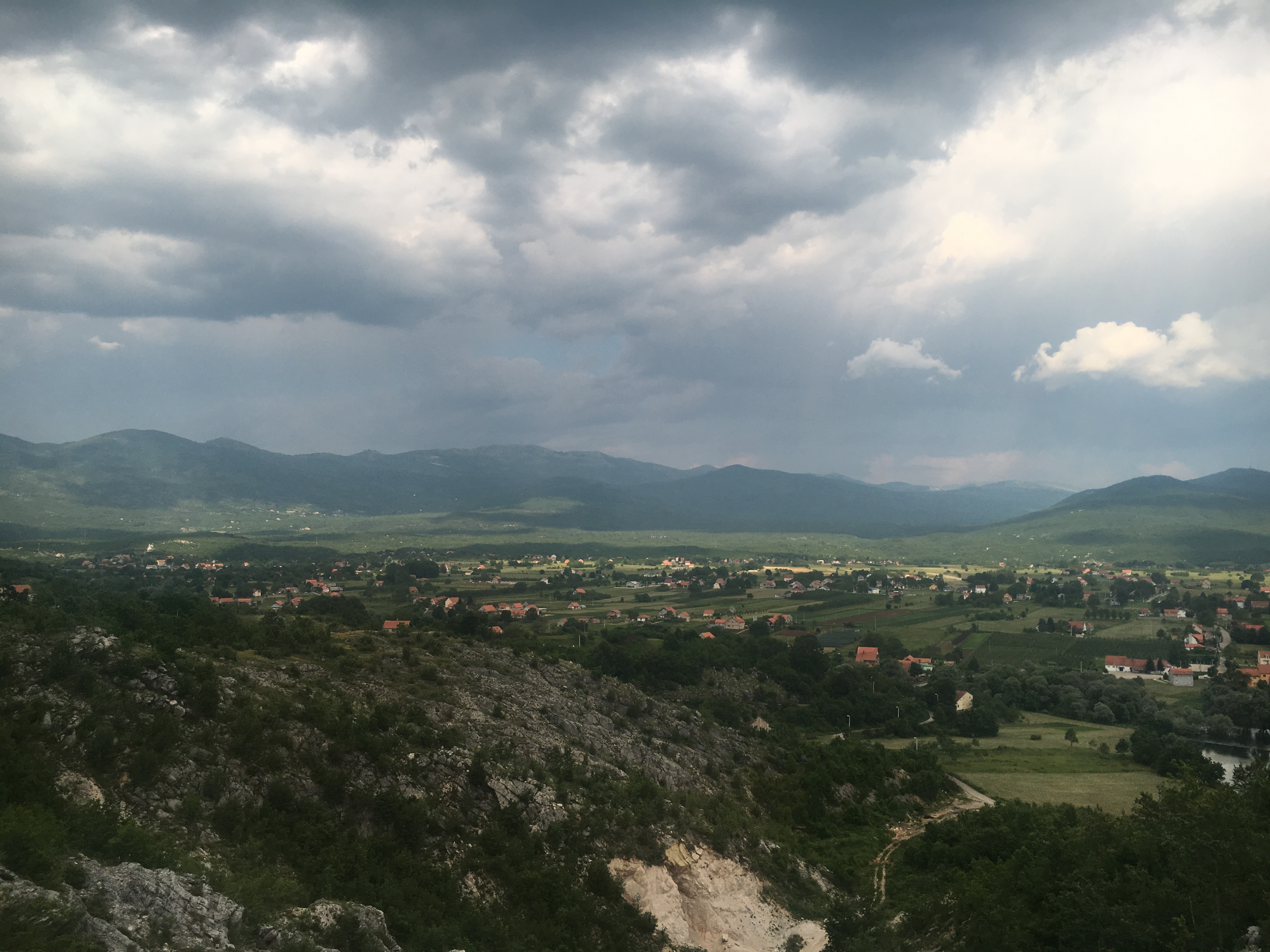

Gornje Polje (Serbian Cyrillic: Горње Поље) is a village in the municipality of Nikšić, Montenegro.

== Demographics ==
According to the 2011 census, its population was 168.

Ethnicity in 2011
Ethnicity	Number	Percentage
Montenegrins	111	66.1%
Serbs	43	25.6%
other/undeclared	14	8.3%
Total	168	100%
