= Liverovići =

Liverovići Ливеровићи
- Village
- Location within Montenegro
- Coordinates: 42.741691°N 19.071813°E
- Country: Montenegro
- Municipality: Nikšić

Population (2011)
  - Total: 279
- Time zone: UTC+1 (CET)
  - Summer (DST): UTC+2 (CEST)

Liverovići (Serbian Cyrillic: Ливеровићи) is a village in the municipality of Nikšić, Montenegro. It is located at Lake Liverovići.

== Demographics ==
According to the 2011 census, its population was 279.

Ethnicity in 2011
Ethnicity	Number	Percentage
Montenegrins	142	50.9%
Serbs	107	38.4%
other/undeclared	30	10.8%
Total	279	100%

By 2018 the population had increased to 433.
