= Bjeloševina, Nikšić =

Montenegro Village

Bjeloševina Бјелошевина
- Village
- Location within Montenegro
- Coordinates: 42.720406°N 19.137546°E
- Country: Montenegro
- Municipality: Nikšić

Population (2011)
  - Total: 217
- Time zone: UTC+1 (CET)
  - Summer (DST): UTC+2 (CEST)

Bjeloševina (Serbian Cyrillic: Бјелошевина) is a village in the municipality of Nikšić, Montenegro.

== Demographics ==
According to the 2011 census, its population was 217.

1. Montenegrins (76.0%)
2. Serbs (19.4%)
3. Other (4.60%)

Ethnicity in 2011
Ethnicity	Number	Percentage
Montenegrins	165	76.0%
Serbs	42	19.4%
other/undeclared	10	4.6%
Total	217	100%
