= Bršno =

Bršno Бршно
- Village

- Location within Montenegro
- Coordinates: 42.731319°N 19.023670°E
- Country: Montenegro
- Municipality: Nikšić

Population (2011)
  - Total: 152
- Time zone: UTC+1 (CET)
  - Summer (DST): UTC+2 (CEST)

Bršno (Serbian Cyrillic: Бршно) is a village in the municipality of Nikšić, Montenegro.

== Demographics ==
According to the 2011 census, its population was 152.

Ethnicity in 2011
Ethnicity	Number	Percentage
Montenegrins	103	67.8%
Serbs	19	12.5%
other/undeclared	30	19.7%
Total	152	100%
