= Ivica Tunnel =

Road tunnel in Montenegro

Coordinates: 43°3′0.5″N 19°5′27.3″E

The Ivica Tunnel is a road tunnel in Montenegro, between the towns of Šavnik and Žabljak in the Drobnjaci region, which opened in December 2010. At 2.2 kilometers long it is the second longest vehicular tunnel in Montenegro.
