= Tupan, Nikšić =

Tupan Тупан
- Village
- Location within Montenegro
- Coordinates: 42.789292°N 18.635174°E
- Country: Montenegro
- Municipality: Nikšić

Population (2011)
  - Total: 135
- Time zone: UTC+1 (CET)
  - Summer (DST): UTC+2 (CEST)

Tupan (Serbian Cyrillic: Тупан) is a small village in the municipality of Nikšić, Montenegro.

== Demographics ==
According to the 2011 census, its population was 135.

Ethnicity in 2011
Ethnicity	Number	Percentage
Serbs	68	50.4%
Montenegrins	52	38.5%
other/undeclared	15	11.1%
Total	135	100%
