= Dučić (Mionica) =

Coordinates: 44°15′04″N 20°10′06″E

Dučić Дучић
- Village (Selo)
- Interactive map of Dučić
- Country: Serbia
- District: Kolubara
- Municipality: Mionica
- Time zone: UTC+1 (CET)
  - Summer (DST): UTC+2 (CEST)

Dučić is a village situated in Mionica municipality in Serbia.
