= Petrovići, Nikšić =

Petrovići Петровићи
- Village
- Location within Montenegro
- Coordinates: 42.770729°N 18.517349°E
- Country: Montenegro
- Municipality: Nikšić

Population (2011)
  - Total: 163
- Time zone: UTC+1 (CET)
  - Summer (DST): UTC+2 (CEST)

Petrovići (Serbian Cyrillic: Петровићи) is a village in the municipality of Nikšić, Montenegro.

== Demographics ==
According to the 2011 census, its population was 163.

Ethnicity in 2011
Ethnicity	Number	Percentage
Montenegrins	88	54.0%
Serbs	67	41.1%
other/undeclared	8	4.9%
Total	163	100%
