= Heterolatzeliidae =

Scientific classification
- Kingdom: Animalia
- Phylum: Arthropoda
- Subphylum: Myriapoda
- Class: Diplopoda
- Order: Chordeumatida
- Superfamily: Brannerioidea
- Family: Heterolatzeliidae

Family of millipedes

Heterolatzeliidae is a family of millipedes belonging to the order Chordeumatida. Adult millipedes in this family have 30 segments (counting the collum as the first segment and the telson as the last).

== Systematics ==
Family Heterolatzeliidae consists of 2 genera:

- Heterolatzelia Verhoeff, 1897
- Massarilatzelia Makarov & Raða, 2011
