= Vasiljevići, Nikšić =

Vasiljevići Васиљевићи
- Village
- Location within Montenegro
- Coordinates: 42.724571°N 19.121624°E
- Country: Montenegro
- Municipality: Nikšić

Population (2011)
  - Total: 116
- Time zone: UTC+1 (CET)
  - Summer (DST): UTC+2 (CEST)

Vasiljevići (Serbian Cyrillic: Васиљевићи) is a small village in the municipality of Nikšić, Montenegro.

== Demographics ==
According to the 2011 census, its population was 116.

Ethnicity in 2011
Ethnicity	Number	Percentage
Montenegrins	81	69.8%
Serbs	32	27.6%
other/undeclared	3	2.6%
Total	116	100%
