= Dučići =

- Village
- Location within Bosnia and Herzegovina
- Country: Bosnia and Herzegovina
- Entity: Federation of Bosnia and Herzegovina
- Canton: Bosnian-Podrinje Goražde
- Municipality: Goražde

Area
  - Total: 0.39 sq mi (1.01 km^{2})
- Elevation: 1,493 ft (455 m)

Population (2013)
  - Total: 273
  - Density: 700/sq mi (270/km^{2})
- Time zone: UTC+1 (CET)
  - Summer (DST): UTC+2 (CEST)

Dučići is a suburb in the city of Goražde, Bosnia and Herzegovina.

== Demographics ==
According to the 2013 census, its population was 273.

Ethnicity in 2013
Ethnicity	Number	Percentage
Bosniaks	258	94.5%
Serbs	8	2.9%
Croats	1	0.4%
other/undeclared	6	2.2%
Total	273	100%
