= Dučice =

Dučice Дучице
- Village
- Location within Montenegro
- Coordinates: 42.716228°N 19.123406°E
- Country: Montenegro
- Municipality: Nikšić

Population (2011)
  - Total: 552
- Time zone: UTC+1 (CET)
  - Summer (DST): UTC+2 (CEST)

Dučice (Serbian Cyrillic: Дучице) is a village in the municipality of Nikšić, Montenegro.

== Demographics ==
According to the 2011 census, its population was 552.

Ethnicity in 2011
Ethnicity	Number	Percentage
Montenegrins	305	55.3%
Serbs	205	37.1%
other/undeclared	42	7.6%
Total	552	100%
