= Rogami =

Rogami (Cyrillic: Рогами) was a historical Albanian tribe in the Middle Ages. They inhabited the Brda (Montenegro) area in central and eastern Montenegro, being centered around the region of Piperi. Toponyms related to them can be found in many parts of the region.

The name Rogami is a compound of the Albanian words rogë (meaning 'clearing') and amë (meaning 'spring'). It appears in many locations throughout Brda and Malësia. Rogame is the name of a village of the Piperi, being mentioned since in 1455 (nominally divided into Gornji and Donji Rogami), while Rogami appears as the name of a mountain in Montenegro. The name Roge appears as one of the places where the Kuči would hold meetings and gatherings. The neighborhood's of Rogami in Podgorica, as well as Rogame in Tuzi Municipality are also linked to the tribe.

In the 1416-17 Venetian cadaster of Shkodër the surname Rogami appears in a few different villages. The village of Martan is headed by Nikolla Rogami, and is inhabited by a certain Konstantin Rogami among others. Pal, Gusman and Zorz Rogami inhabit the villages of Bardh, Somes and Vulkatan respectively. Members of the tribe are also mentioned in a few other villages.

In the 1485 Ottoman cadaster of the sanjak of Shkodër the village of Rogam is mentioned as one of the villages forming the nahija of Piperi. The village has 11 households and could be an annual 550 ducats. The heads of the households were: Milan and Tanush sons of Vuçrin, Nokaç and Lazar sons of Progon, Radla son of Petko, Dabzhiv son of Gjorgji, Gjoçko son of Blin, Vuksan son of Grubaç, Vuçeta son of Bezhan and lastly the households of Nikolla Bashiqi and Progonaç Braniqi. The names of the village suggest it was starting to undergo a process of Slavicisation.
