= Jelena Šaulić =

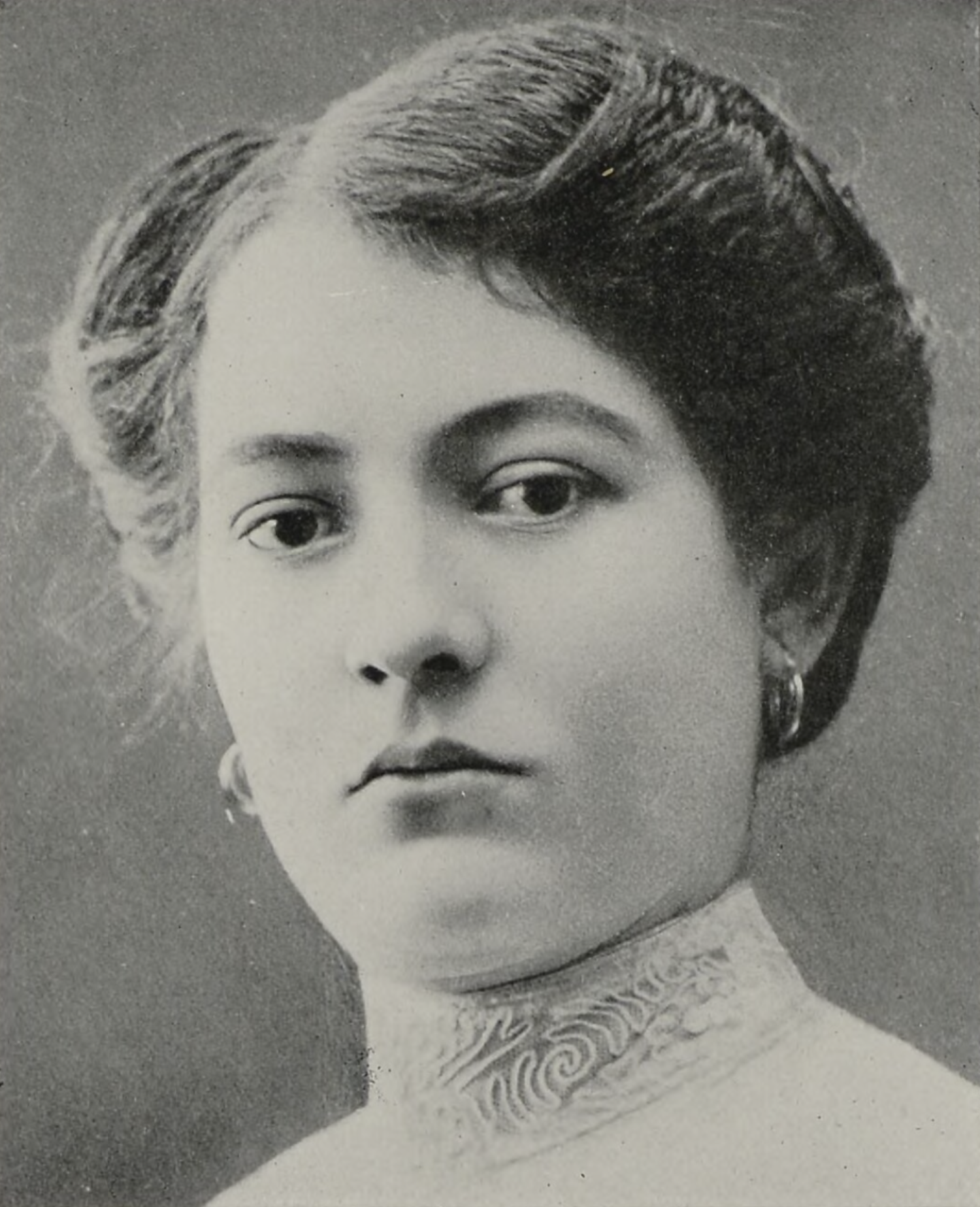
Jelena Bojović-Šaulić (c. 1920)

Jelena Šaulić (1896 – 21 March 1921) was a Serbian teacher who participated as a Chetnik (guerrilla) in the Toplica Uprising of World War I.

== Early years and education ==
Jelena Šaulić was born in Junča do near Žabljak in 1896. She was the youngest of five children in the family of Perko Šaulić, an Orthodox priest. The family moved to Serbia. In record-breaking short time before World War I, she graduated from the school of teacher instruction, and received her appointment as a teacher in Prizren.

== Career ==
In February 1917, Bulgarian forces killed her mother and four days later the Toplica Uprising started. Šaulić joined the rebels with her father. After the failure of the uprising, she crossed over to Montenegro with her father and the rest of the rebels. There, they joined the group of irregular military, led by vojvoda Boško Bojović. Šaulić was feared not only by the occupying forces but also by the irregulars who had joined only to loot, whom she mercilessly punished.

After the war, she married her war companion, Bojović, and started working as a teacher in Pljevlja. She died in Pljevlja on 21 March 1921 at the age of 26 from the consequences of the wounds sustained in the exhausting battles she took part in. She was posthumously awarded the Karadjordje’s Star with Swords for exceptional bravery. The Association of Warriors and War Veterans or 1912-1918 from Pljevlja, raised a memorial plaque for her at the Pljevlja City Cemetery where she was buried.
