= Grab, Trebinje =

Grab Граб
- Village
- Location within Bosnia and Herzegovina
- Coordinates: 42°36′16″N 18°25′34″E
- Country: Bosnia and Herzegovina
- Entity: Republika Srpska
- Municipality: Trebinje
- Time zone: UTC+1 (CET)
  - Summer (DST): UTC+2 (CEST)

Grab (Serbian Cyrillic: Граб) is a village in the municipality of Trebinje, Republika Srpska, Bosnia and Herzegovina. In the census of 1991, there were 135 people, all Serbs.
