= Dolovi, Nikšić =

Village/Settlement in the Municipality of Niksic Montenegro

Coordinates: 42°42′26″N 18°34′29″E

Dolovi Долови
- Village
- Interactive map of Dolovi
- Country: Montenegro
- Municipality: Nikšić

Population (2003)
  - Total: 14

Dolovi is a village in the municipality of Niksic in Montenegro. According to the 2003 census, there were 14 inhabitants (according to the 1991 census, there were 19 inhabitants).

== Demography ==
Population
Years	Inhabitants
1948	80
1953	93
1961	84
1971	44
1981	22
1991	19
2003	14
