= Klenak, Nikšić =

Klenak Кленак
- Village
- Location within Montenegro
- Coordinates: 42.816227°N 18.563541°E
- Country: Montenegro
- Municipality: Nikšić

Population (2011)
  - Total: 130
- Time zone: UTC+1 (CET)
  - Summer (DST): UTC+2 (CEST)

Klenak (Cyrillic: Кленак) is a village in the municipality of Nikšić, Montenegro.

== Demographics ==
According to the 2011 census, its population was 130.

Ethnicity in 2011
Ethnicity	Number	Percentage
Montenegrins	66	55.3%
Serbs	54	37.1%
other/undeclared	10	7.6%
Total	130	100%
