= Riđani, Nikšić =

Riđani Риђани
- Village
- Location within Montenegro
- Coordinates: 42.767178°N 18.893256°E
- Country: Montenegro
- Municipality: Nikšić

Population (2011)
  - Total: 179
- Time zone: UTC+1 (CET)
  - Summer (DST): UTC+2 (CEST)

Riđani (Serbian Cyrillic: Риђани) is a village in the municipality of Nikšić, Montenegro.

== Demographics ==
According to the 2011 census, its population was 179.

Ethnicity in 2011
Ethnicity	Number	Percentage
Montenegrins	131	73.2%
Serbs	34	19.0%
other/undeclared	14	7.8%
Total	179	100%
