= Zagrad, Nikšić =

Zagrad Заград
- Village
- Location within Montenegro
- Coordinates: 42.749745°N 19.093342°E
- Country: Montenegro
- Municipality: Nikšić

Population (2011)
  - Total: 357
- Time zone: UTC+1 (CET)
  - Summer (DST): UTC+2 (CEST)

Zagrad (Serbian Cyrillic: Заград) is a village in the municipality of Nikšić, Montenegro.

== Demographics ==
According to the 2011 census, its population was 357.

Ethnicity in 2011
| Ethnicity | Number | Percentage |
|---|---|---|
| Montenegrins | 251 | 70.3% |
| Serbs | 101 | 28.3% |
| other/undeclared | 5 | 1.4% |
| Total | 357 | 100% |
