= Nudo, Nikšić =

Nudo Нудо
- Village
- Location within Montenegro
- Coordinates: 42.674830°N 18.569918°E
- Country: Montenegro
- Municipality: Nikšić

Population (2011)
  - Total: 199
- Time zone: UTC+1 (CET)
  - Summer (DST): UTC+2 (CEST)

Nudo (Serbian Cyrillic: Нудо) is a village in the municipality of Nikšić, Montenegro. It is located close to the Bosnian border.

== Demographics ==
According to the 2011 census, its population was 199.

Ethnicity in 2011
| Ethnicity | Number | Percentage |
|---|---|---|
| Montenegrins | 124 | 62.3% |
| Serbs | 48 | 24.1% |
| other/undeclared | 27 | 13.6% |
| Total | 199 | 100% |
