= Vir, Nikšić =

Vir Вир
- Village
- Location within Montenegro
- Coordinates: 42.849393°N 18.924537°E
- Country: Montenegro
- Municipality: Nikšić

Population (2011)
  - Total: 810
- Time zone: UTC+1 (CET)
  - Summer (DST): UTC+2 (CEST)

Vir (Serbian Cyrillic: Вир) is a village in the municipality of Nikšić, Montenegro. It is located north to the city of Nikšić.

== Demographics ==
According to the 2011 census, its population was 810.

Ethnicity in 2011
Ethnicity	Number	Percentage
Montenegrins	491	60.6%
Serbs	221	27.3%
other/undeclared	98	12.1%
Total	810	100%
