= Cerovo, Nikšić =

Cerovo Церово
- Village
- Location within Montenegro
- Coordinates: 42.668493°N 18.973041°E
- Country: Montenegro
- Municipality: Nikšić

Population (2011)
  - Total: 148
- Time zone: UTC+1 (CET)
  - Summer (DST): UTC+2 (CEST)

Cerovo (Serbian Cyrillic: Церово) is a village in the municipality of Nikšić, Montenegro.

== Demographics ==
According to the 2011 census, its population was 148.

Ethnicity in 2011
Ethnicity	Number	Percentage
Montenegrins	133	89.9%
Serbs	14	9.5%
other/undeclared	1	0.7%
Total	148	100%
