= Šula =

Šula Шула
- Village
- Location within Montenegro
- Country: Montenegro
- Municipality: Pljevlja

Population (2011)
  - Total: 340
- Time zone: UTC+1 (CET)
  - Summer (DST): UTC+2 (CEST)

Šula (Montenegrin: Шула) is a village in the municipality of Pljevlja, Montenegro.

== Demographics ==
According to the 2003 census, the village had a population of 462 people.

According to the 2011 census, its population was 340.

Ethnicity in 2011
Ethnicity	Number	Percentage
Serbs	233	68.5%
Montenegrins	97	28.5%
other/undeclared	10	2.9%
Total	340	100%
