= Čevo =

Čevo Чево
- Village
- Location within Montenegro
- Country: Montenegro
- Region: Central
- Municipality: Old Royal Capital Cetinje

Population (2011)
  - Total: 61
- Time zone: UTC+1 (CET)
  - Summer (DST): UTC+2 (CEST)

Čevo (Montenegrin Cyrillic: Чево), historically also known as Kčevo (Кчево), is a village in the municipality of Cetinje, Montenegro.

== History ==
The village was held by the Ozrinići tribe of the Katunska nahija. Five families of the Ozrinići founded the settlement of Ozrinići in the Nikšić area in 1657.

== Demographics ==
Ethnicity in 2011
Ethnicity	Number	Percentage
Montenegrins	60	98.4%
Others	1	1.6%
Total	61	100%

== Notable people ==
- Milena Vukotić (1848–1923), Queen consort of Montenegro
- Janko Vukotić (1866–1927), Montenegrin politician and general.
- Vasilija Vukotić (1897–1970), Montenegrin military heroine of World War I
