= Žabljak Municipality =

Žabǉak Municipality Opština Žabǉak Општина Жабљак
- Municipality
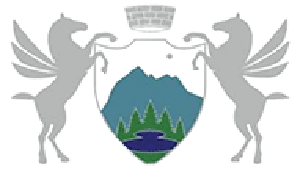
- Coat of arms

- Žabǉak Municipality in Montenegro
- Country: Montenegro
- Seat: Žabljak
- Settlements: 28

Area
  - Total: 445 km^{2} (172 sq mi)
- Time zone: UTC+1
- Postal code: 84220
- Area code: +382 52
- ISO 3166-2 code: ME-21
- Car plates: ŽB
- Climate: Dfb
- Website: www.zabljak.me

Žabǉak Municipality (Montenegrin: Opština Žabǉak / Општина Жабљак) is one of the municipalities of Montenegro. The municipality is located in northern Montenegro. The administrative center is the small town of Žabǉak.

== Location and tourism ==
Žabljak is the centre of Montenegro's mountain tourism. The entire area of Durmitor mountain is protected as a national park, and offers great possibilities for both winter and summer mountain tourism. The town of Žabljak is in the centre of the Durmitor mountain region and, with an altitude of 1,456 metres, is the highest situated town on the Balkans. Among the main tourist attractions of Durmitor are 18 glacier lakes; the biggest and closest to Žabljak being Crno jezero, (literally "Black Lake"). Durmitor's slopes are also becoming increasingly popular among snowboarders.

One problem hampering the development of Žabljak as a major regional mountain tourism destination is the lack of quality road infrastructure. The situation has been improving somewhat in recent years. Žabljak's main road connection with the rest of Montenegro is the road that links Žabljak with Mojkovac and the E65, the main road connection between the Montenegrin coast, Podgorica and the north. The other significant road connection is through Šavnik and Nikšić, on to Risan or Podgorica. Since 2010, with the reconstruction of the Risan-Žabljak road, the average trip from Žabljak to the Adriatic Sea is shortened to circa two hours. The town has an airport (Žabljak Airport) but the closest International Airport is Podgorica Airport some 170 km (110 mi) away, which has regular flights to European destinations.

=== City Assembly (2022–2026) ===
Party/Coalition	Seats	Local government
DPS	9 / 31	Opposition
DI	6 / 31	Government
DCG	5 / 31	Government
ZBCG (NSD–DNP)	4 / 31	Government
SNP	3 / 31	Government
PzP	1 / 31	Government
DSS	1 / 31	Government
SD	1 / 31	Opposition

== Demographics ==
The town of Žabljak is the administrative centre of the Žabljak municipality, which has a population of 2 941, according to the 2023 census. The town of Žabljak itself has a population of 1,937, and there are no other bigger settlements in the Municipality. According to the last national census of 2023, the Municipality is made up of the following ethnic groups; 52,64% of Serbs and 42,43% of Montenegrins, while 4.93% of the residents were of other origin or undeclared. By language 67,19% spoke Serbian, while 27,20% spoke Montenegrin. By religious affiliation, Eastern Orthodoxy was largely predominant with 96,63%.

== Gallery ==
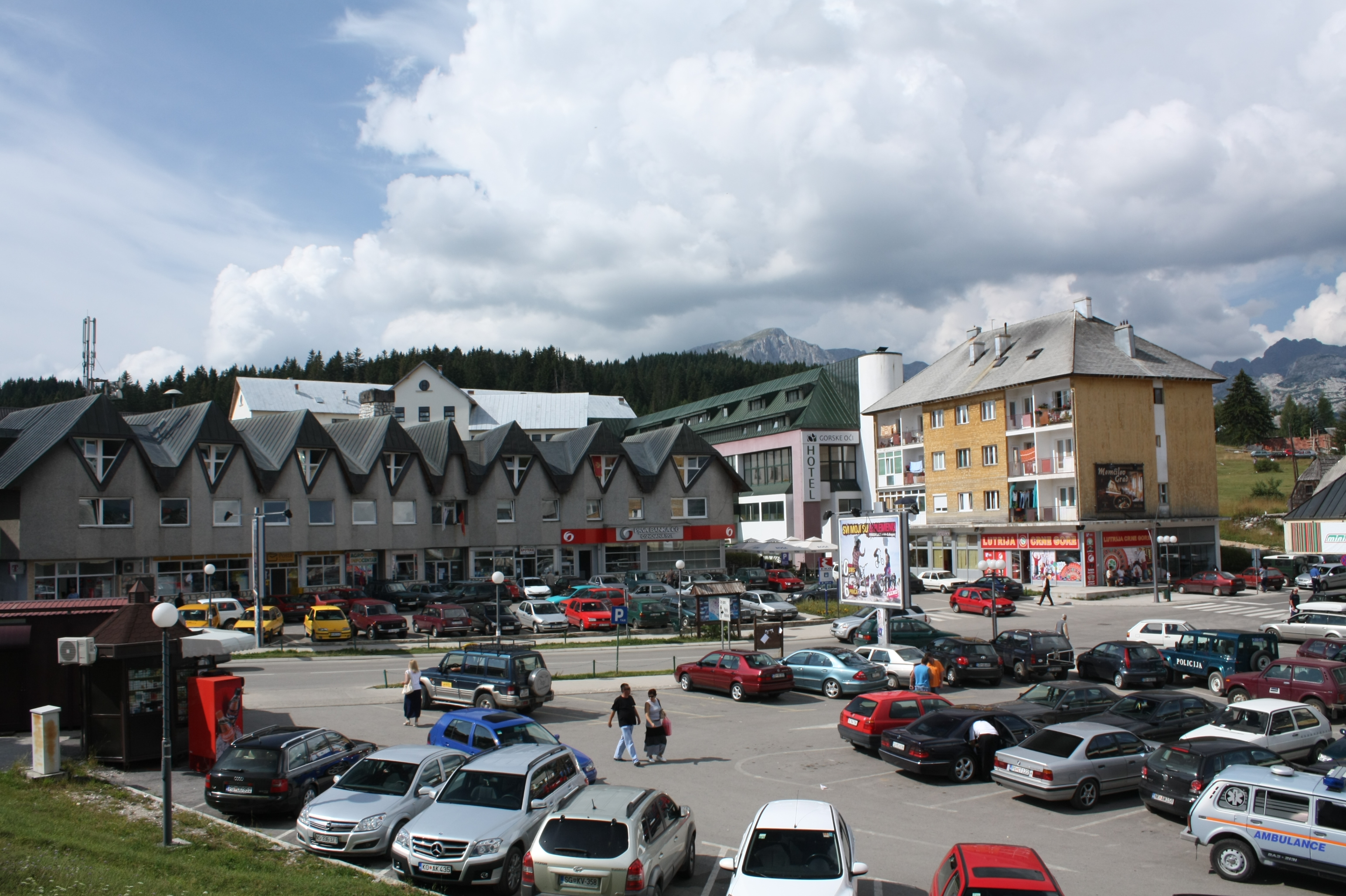
Town of Žabljak

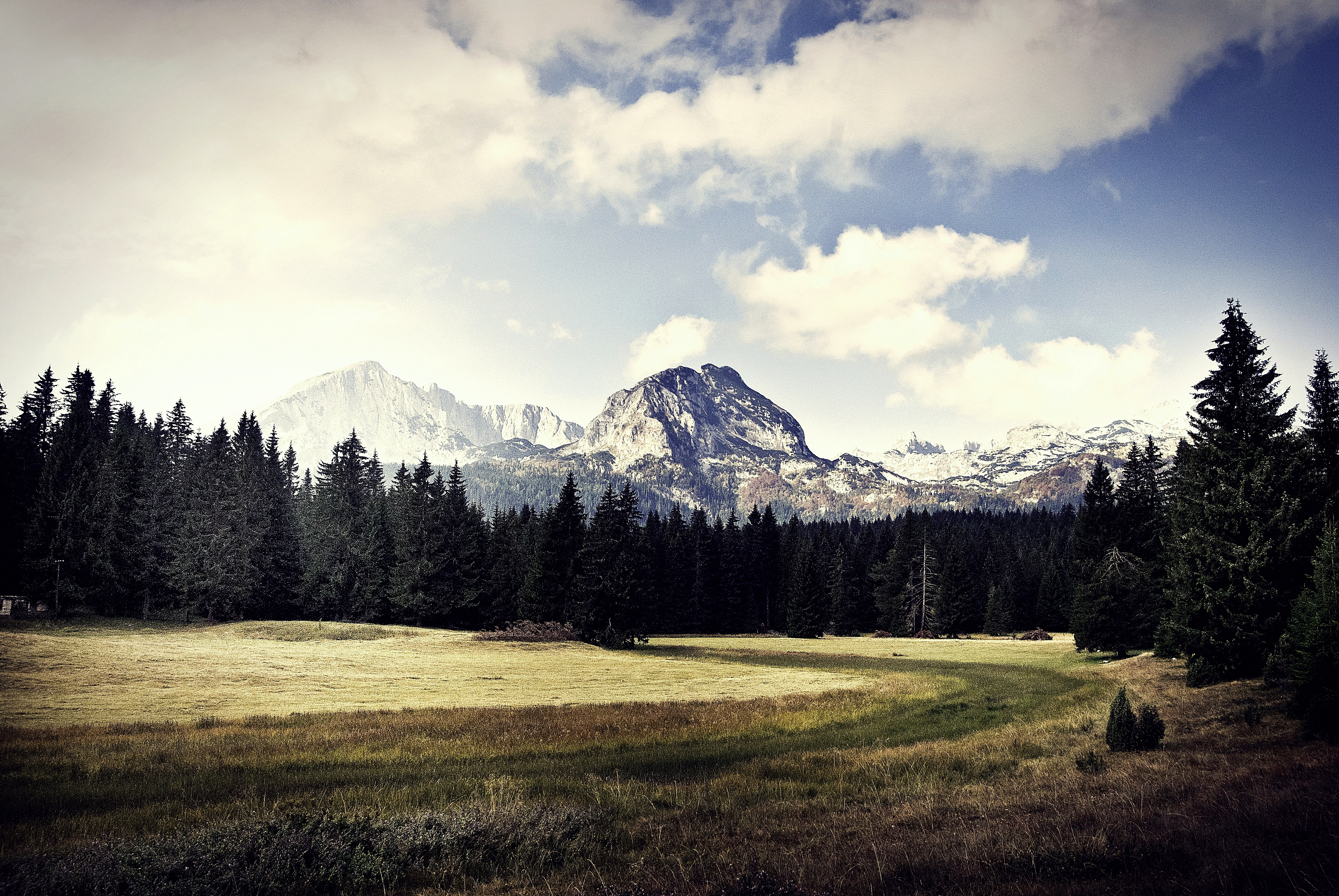
Durmitor National Park

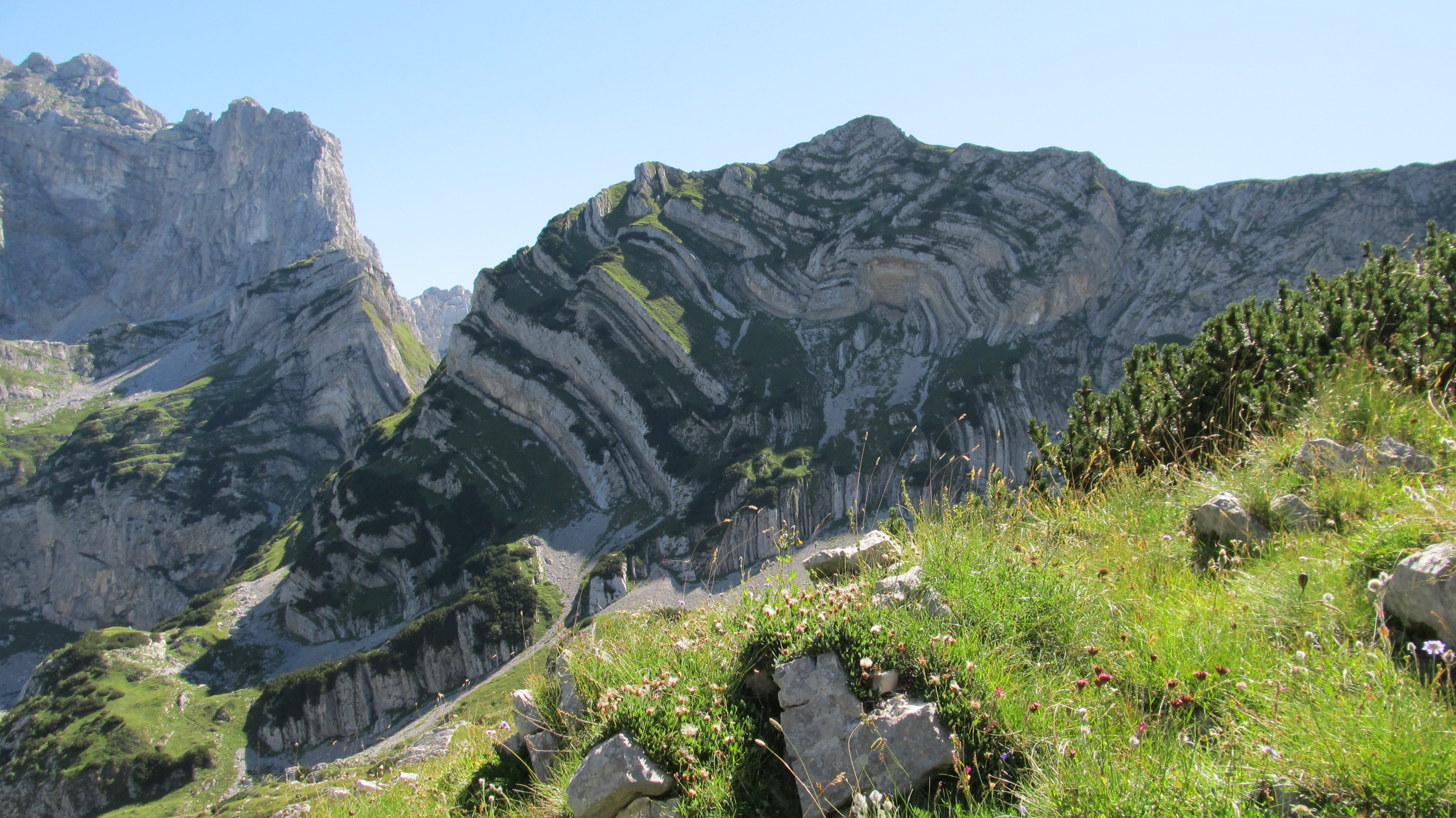
Bobotov Kuk, Durmitor

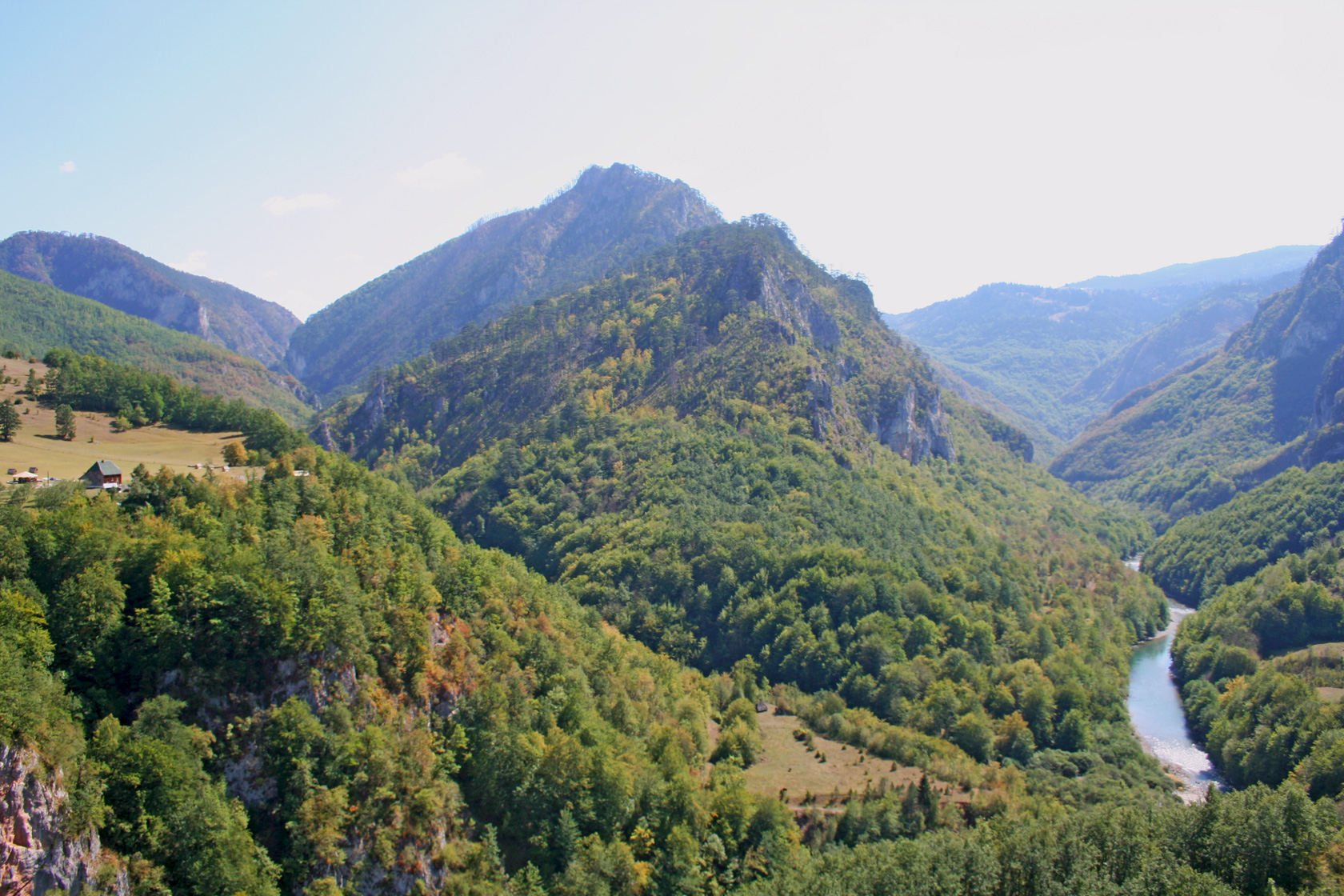
Tara river

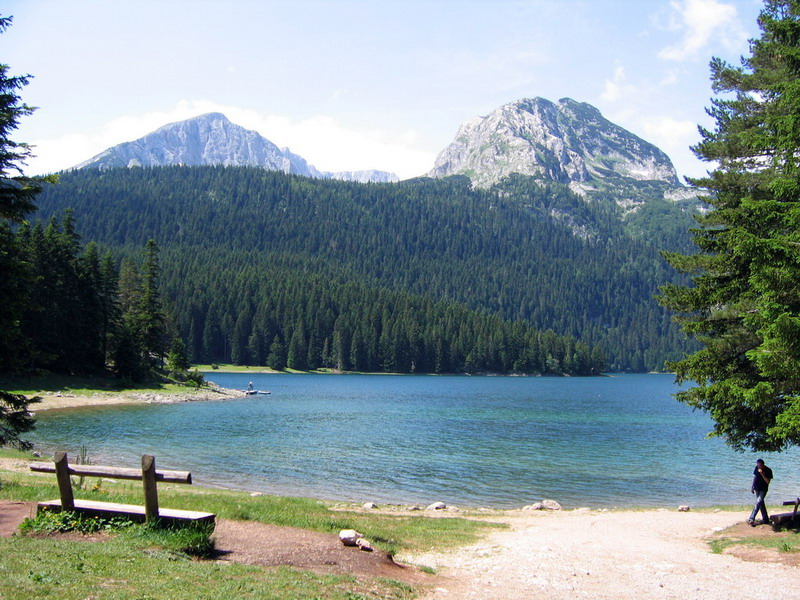
Black lake near Žabljak

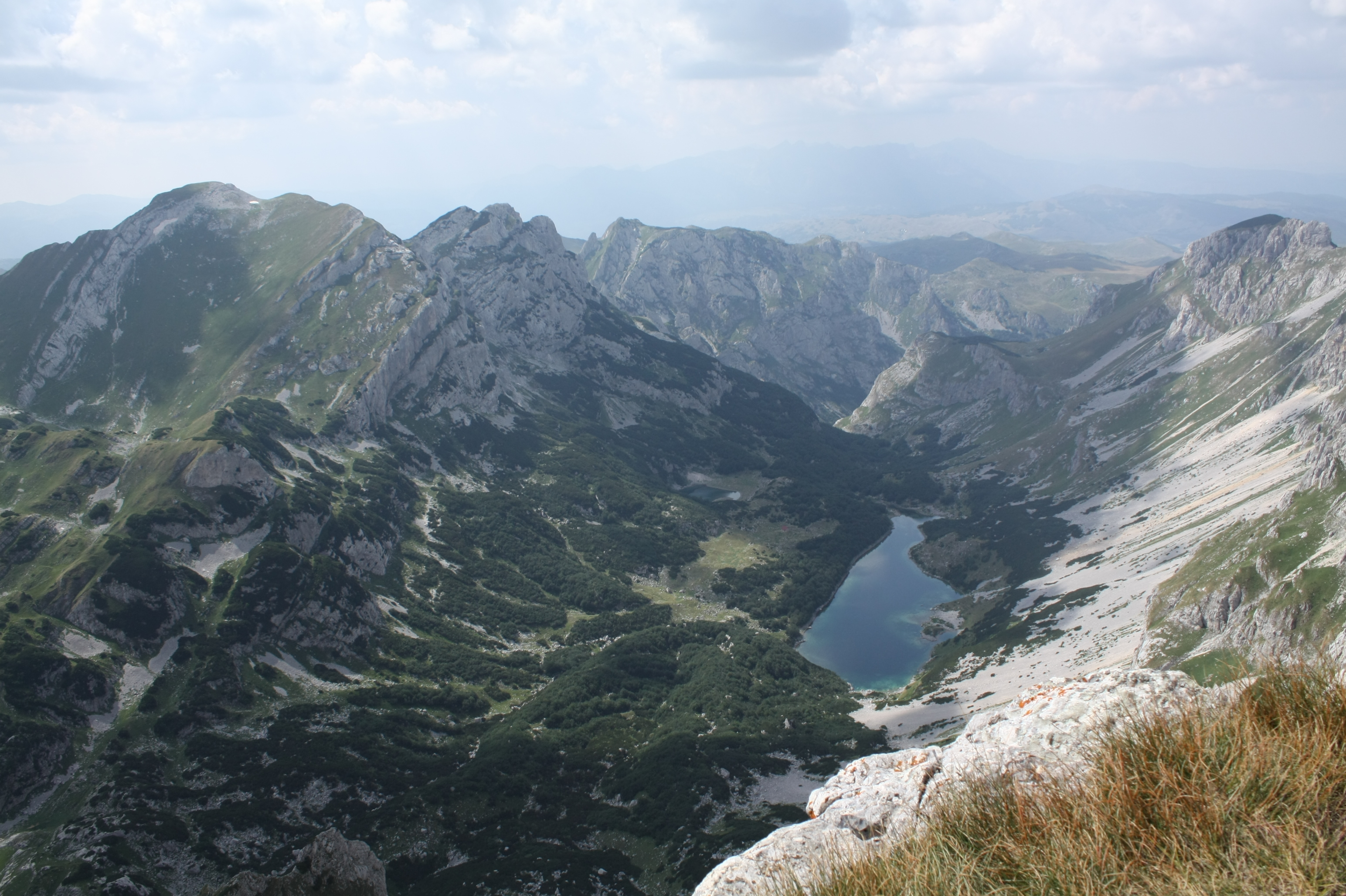
Škrčko lake, Durmitor

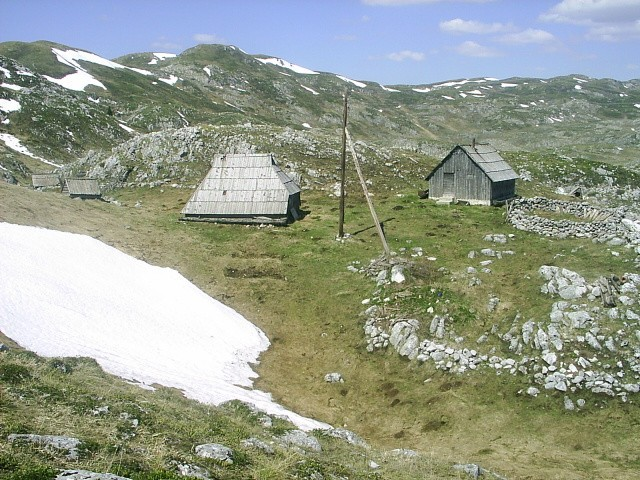
Sinjajevina mountain

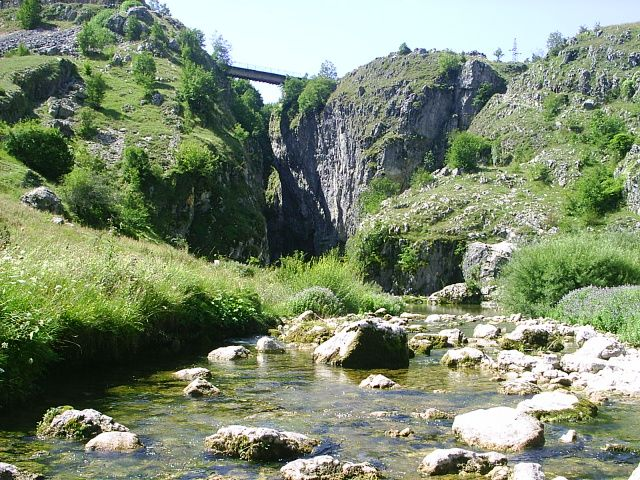
Komarnica river
