= Vilusi, Nikšić =

Vilusi Вилуси
- Village
- Location within Montenegro
- Country: Montenegro
- Municipality: Nikšić

Population (2011)
  - Total: 171
- Time zone: UTC+1 (CET)
  - Summer (DST): UTC+2 (CEST)

Vilusi (Serbian Cyrillic: Вилуси) is a village in Nikšić Municipality, Montenegro. It is the village closest the Klobuk border crossing with Bosnia and Herzegovina (for Trebinje), although the actual main road does not go through the heart of the village.

== History ==
In antiquity, Vilusi had a castle named Salthua.

== Demographics ==
According to the 2011 census, the village was inhabited by 87 Montenegrins and 75 Serbs. According to the 2003 census, the village was inhabited by 113 Serbs and 91 Montenegrins.
