= Žabljak =

Town and municipality in Northern Montenegro

Žabljak Жабљак
- Town and municipality
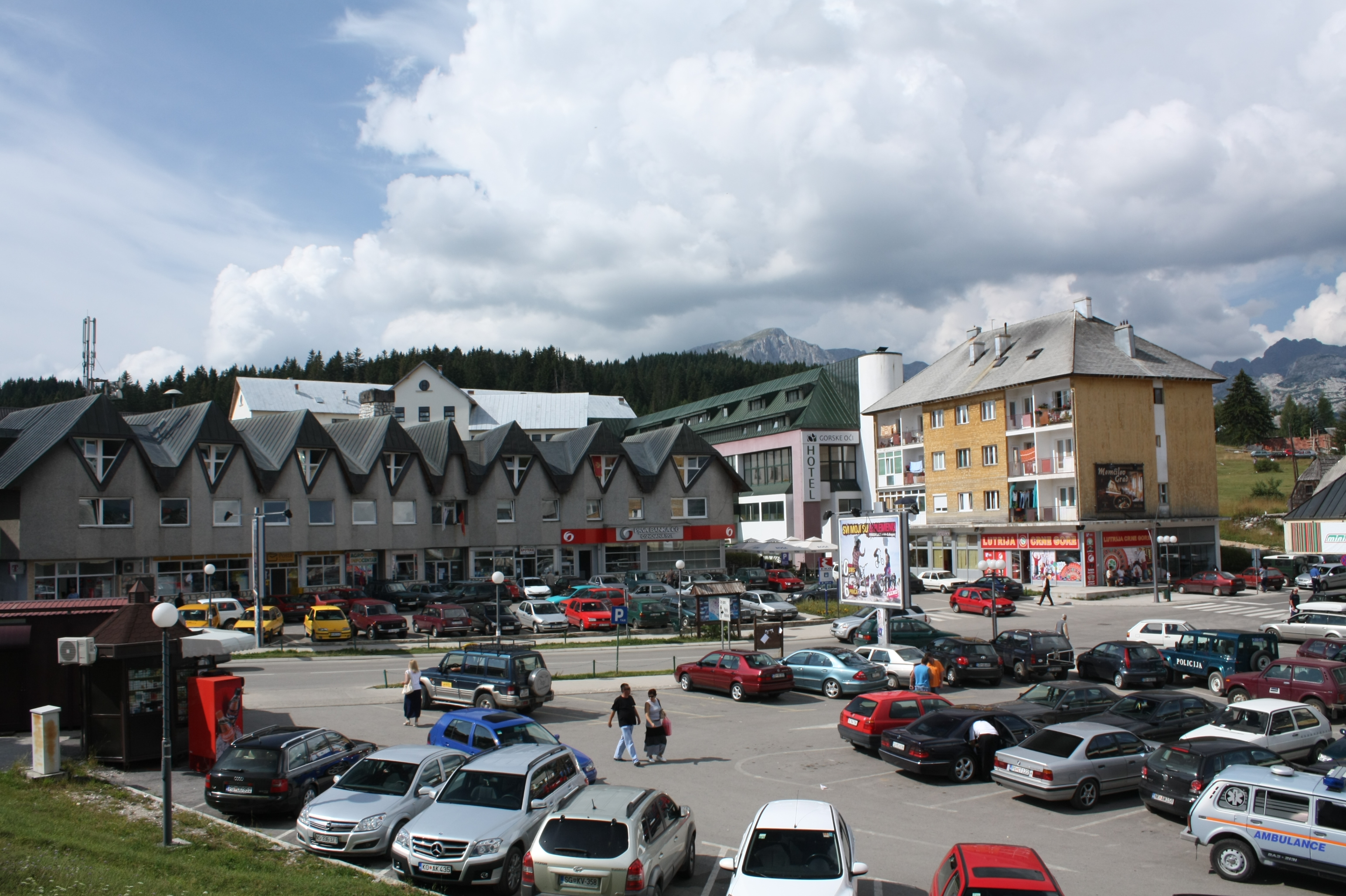
- Main square of Žabljak

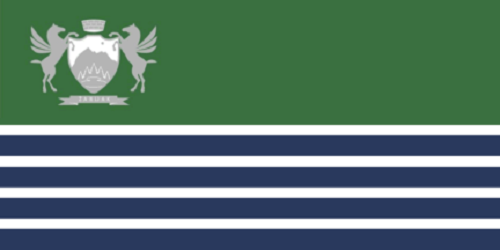
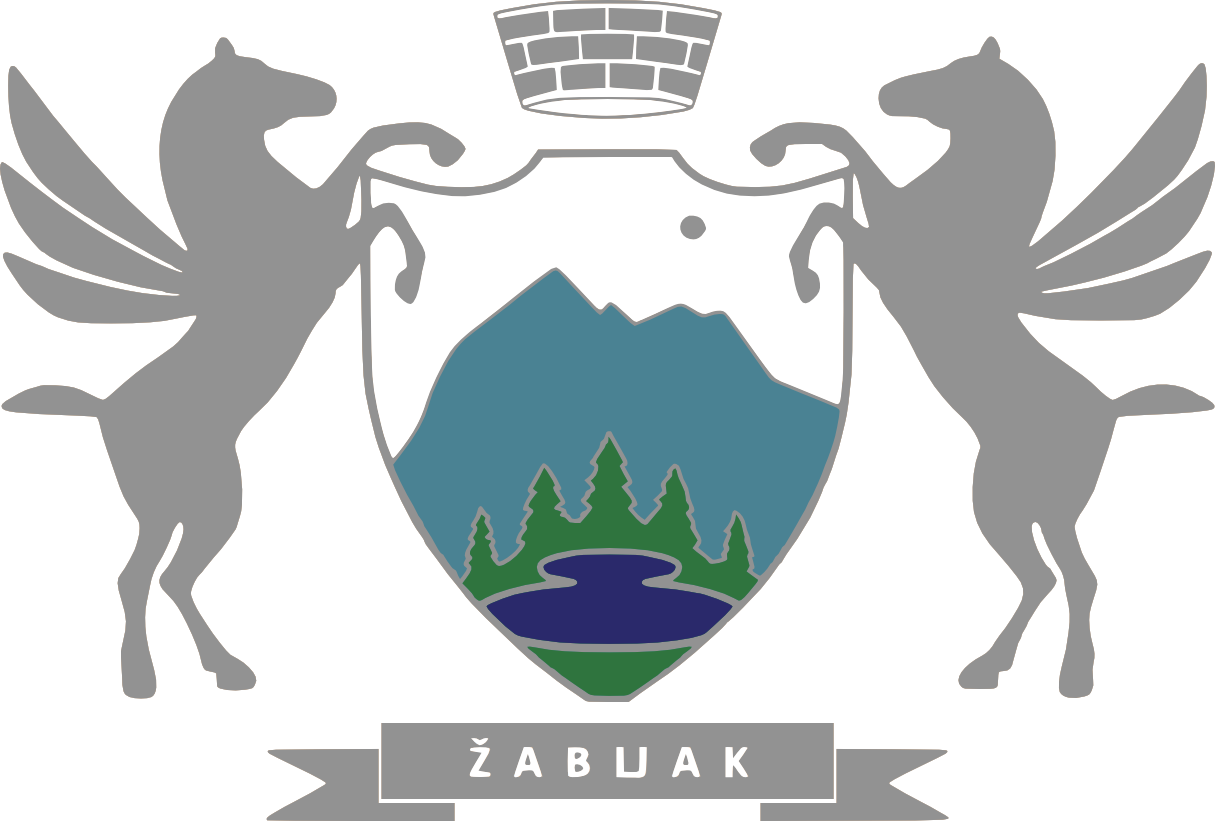
- Flag Coat of arms

- Location within Montenegro
- Coordinates: 43.155011°N 19.120846°E
- Country: Montenegro
- Region: Northern
- Municipality: Žabljak
- Founded: 1871
- Settlements: 28

Government
  - Type: Mayor-Assembly
  - Mayor: Radoš Žugić (DI)

Area
  - Town and municipality: 445 km^{2} (172 sq mi)

Population (2011 census)
  - Density: 9/km^{2} (23/sq mi)
  - Urban: 1,723
  - Rural: 1,846
  - Municipality: 3,569
- Time zone: UTC+1 (CET)
  - Summer (DST): UTC+2 (CEST)
- Postal code: 84220
- Area code: +382 52
- ISO 3166-2 code: ME-21
- Car plates: ŽB
- Climate: Dfb
- Website: www.zabljak.me

Žabljak (Montenegrin Cyrillic: Жабљак, pronounced [ʒâbʎaːk]) is a small town in the northern region of Montenegro. It has a population of 1,723.

Žabljak is the seat of Žabljak Municipality (2011 population: 3,569). The town is in the centre of the Durmitor mountain region and with an altitude of 1,456 metres, it is the highest situated Balkan town.

== History ==
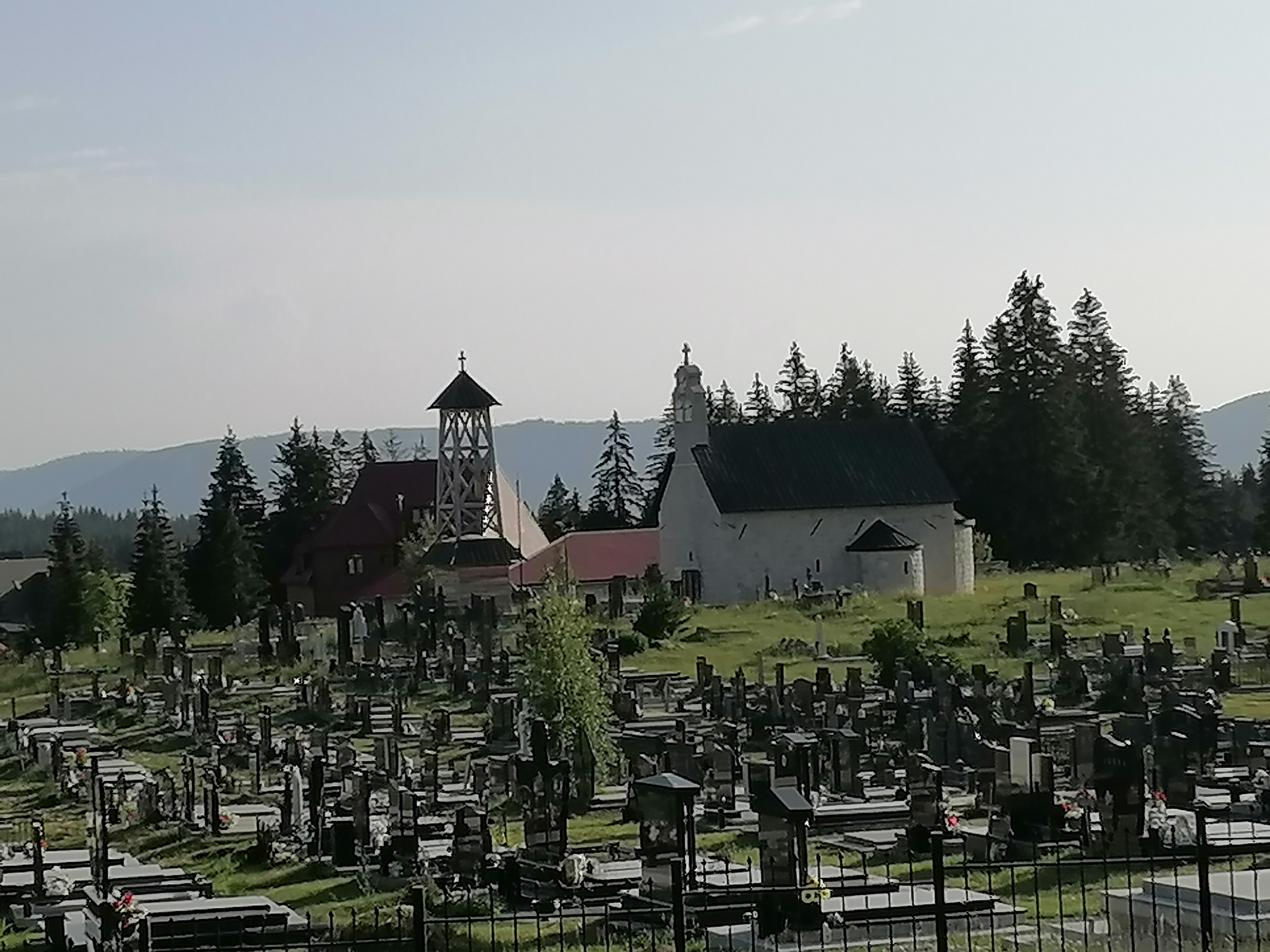

The first Slavic name of the place was Varezina voda (Варезина вода) possibly because of the strong source of drinkable water nearby, making a settlement possible. Later, the town was renamed Hanovi because it was where caravans rested. The modern name dates from 1870, when in a single day the building of a school, church and captain's home began. However, almost all the original buildings were destroyed during the Balkan Wars. All that has remained is the old church of Sv. Preobraženje (Holy Transfiguration), built in 1862 as a monument to a Montenegrin victory in the battle against the Ottoman Empire. After Žabljak was established as a town, stores and cafés were opened. As such, in the 1880s Žabljak became a market town, leading it to become the administrative center of the region.

In the Ottoman defter of 1582, there were 28 Christian houses and 36 Muslim houses.

In the period shortly before World War II, Žabljak was a small town with typical mountain architecture. Its unique nature was already drawing the attention of tourists from the Kingdom of Yugoslavia, and also from abroad, especially Italy (because of close ties between Montenegro and Italy).

During World War II, Žabljak was burnt right to its foundations. After the war, Žabljak rebuilt itself and became Montenegro's main centre for mountain tourism and winter sports.

While closed already decades ago, Žabljak holds the distinction of having had Montenegro's only ski jumping hill.

== Demographics ==
Žabljak is the administrative centre of the Žabljak municipality, which has a population of 4,204. The town of Žabljak itself has a population of 1,937, and there are no other bigger settlements in the region.

Population of Zabljak:

- 3 March 1981 – 1,379
- 3 March 1991 – 1,853
- 1 November 2003 – 1,937
- 15 April 2011 – 1723

Ethnic groups (1991 census):

- Montenegrins (91.07%)
- Serbs (7.33%)

Ethnic groups (2003 census):

- Serbs (50.26%)
- Montenegrins (43.03%)

Ethnic groups (2011 census):

- Montenegrins (54.21%)
- Serbs (36.16%)
- Undeclared (6.96%)

== Tourism ==
Žabljak is centre of Montenegro's mountain tourism. The entire area of Durmitor mountain is protected as a national park, and offers great possibilities for both winter and summer mountain tourism. Among the main tourist attractions of Durmitor are 18 glacier lakes; the biggest and closest to Žabljak being Crno jezero, literally "Black Lake". Durmitor's slopes are also becoming increasingly popular among snowboarders. Žabljak caters for activities such as:

- Skiing – Durmitor's snow cover lasts 120 days per year, with decent slopes such as Savin kuk, Štuoc and Javorovača.
- Rafting – the 1300 m deep Tara River canyon is the second deepest in the world, and is listed as a UNESCO World Heritage Site. Rafting on Tara River is one of the most popular tourist activities in Montenegro.
- Mountaineering – Durmitor's conditions are appropriate for this sport.
- Hiking – The surrounding area of the town of Žabljak provides hiking paths.
- Mountain biking- Side-hills of Durmitor are perfect for biking while enjoying the view.

== Climate ==
Žabljak has a humid continental climate (Köppen climate classification: Dfb) with mild summers and cold winters. Precipitation is very high year around.

Climate data for Žabljak (1991–2020, extremes 1958–present)
Month	Jan	Feb	Mar	Apr	May	Jun	Jul	Aug	Sep	Oct	Nov	Dec	Year
Record high °C (°F)	17.7 (63.9)	18.8 (65.8)	17.8 (64.0)	22.5 (72.5)	28.3 (82.9)	30.2 (86.4)	31.2 (88.2)	32.4 (90.3)	29.3 (84.7)	24.6 (76.3)	23.6 (74.5)	16.7 (62.1)	32.4 (90.3)
Mean daily maximum °C (°F)	2.2 (36.0)	2.6 (36.7)	5.5 (41.9)	9.7 (49.5)	14.7 (58.5)	18.8 (65.8)	21.4 (70.5)	22.1 (71.8)	16.5 (61.7)	12.8 (55.0)	7.8 (46.0)	3.2 (37.8)	11.4 (52.6)
Daily mean °C (°F)	−2.6 (27.3)	−2.2 (28.0)	0.8 (33.4)	4.8 (40.6)	9.5 (49.1)	13.4 (56.1)	15.3 (59.5)	15.7 (60.3)	11.1 (52.0)	7.6 (45.7)	3.2 (37.8)	−1.3 (29.7)	6.3 (43.3)
Mean daily minimum °C (°F)	−7.4 (18.7)	−6.9 (19.6)	−3.9 (25.0)	−0.2 (31.6)	4.2 (39.6)	7.9 (46.2)	9.2 (48.6)	9.2 (48.6)	5.6 (42.1)	2.3 (36.1)	−1.5 (29.3)	−5.8 (21.6)	1.1 (33.9)
Record low °C (°F)	−26.4 (−15.5)	−26.3 (−15.3)	−25.3 (−13.5)	−14.6 (5.7)	−10.0 (14.0)	−4.0 (24.8)	0.4 (32.7)	0.1 (32.2)	−5.4 (22.3)	−11.3 (11.7)	−19.4 (−2.9)	−21.7 (−7.1)	−26.4 (−15.5)
Average precipitation mm (inches)	114.3 (4.50)	128.4 (5.06)	122.9 (4.84)	115.8 (4.56)	110.3 (4.34)	89.1 (3.51)	76.7 (3.02)	61.3 (2.41)	116.6 (4.59)	172.6 (6.80)	213.5 (8.41)	183.8 (7.24)	1,505.3 (59.28)
Average precipitation days (≥ 0.1 mm)	10.1	10.9	10.9	11.6	12.7	10.6	9.0	7.8	9.7	10.1	11.5	12.8	127.7
Average relative humidity (%)	82	81	79	77	74	74	72	72	77	79	81	83	78
Mean monthly sunshine hours	91.1	97.0	139.5	159.4	190.8	203.8	257.3	236.1	195.3	161.8	106.3	87.9	1,926.3
Percentage possible sunshine	32	34	38	40	42	45	56	56	53	49	37	32	44
Source 1: NOAA
Source 2: Hydrological and Meteorological Service of Montenegro

== Transport ==
One problem hampering the development of Žabljak as major regional mountain tourism destination is the lack of quality road infrastructure. The situation has been improving somewhat in recent years. Žabljak's main road connection with the rest of Montenegro is the road that links Žabljak with Mojkovac and the E65, the main road connection between the Montenegrin coast, Podgorica and the north.

The other significant road connection is through Šavnik and Nikšić, on to Risan or Podgorica. Since 2010, with the reconstruction of the Risan-Žabljak road, the average trip from Žabljak to the Adriatic Sea is shortened to approximately two hours.

The town has an airport (Žabljak Airport) but the closest International Airport is Podgorica Airport some 170 km (110 mi) away which has regular flights to destinations throughout Europe. There are regular minibus links with Nikšić and Podgorica which arrive at the centrally located Žabljak bus station.

== Notable people ==
- Jelena Šaulić (1896–1921), teacher, fighter, participant in the Toplica Uprising, Komitadji during World War I

== See also ==
- Durmitor Ring Road
- Durmitor
- Black Lake
- Bobotov Kuk
- Savin Kuk
