= Nikšić Municipality =

Municipality of Montenegro

Nikšić Municipality Opština Nikšić Општина Никшић
- Municipality
- Coat of arms

- Nikšić Municipality in Montenegro
- Country: Montenegro
- Seat: Nikšić

Area
  - Total: 2,065 km^{2} (797 sq mi)

Population (2023)
  - Total: 66,725
  - Density: 32.31/km^{2} (83.69/sq mi)
- Postal code: 81400
- Area code: +382 40
- Car plates: NK
- ISO 3166-2 code: ME-12
- Website: www.niksic.me

Nikšić (Montenegrin: Opština Nikšić, Општина Никшић) is one of the municipalities of Montenegro. The municipality is located in the central and northwestern region of Montenegro. The administrative centre of the municipality is the town of Nikšić.

== Geography and location ==
Nikšić has the largest land area of any municipality in Montenegro (covering 15% of Montenegro), and includes 129 settlements. It was also the largest municipality by land area in Socialist Yugoslavia. The town of Nikšić is situated in north-central Montenegro. It is located at the centre of the spacious Nikšić Field (Nikšićko polje), a karst plain with an area of 48 km^{2}, and an elevation of 640 m AMSL. The plain is surrounded by inhospitable rocky mountainous terrain, a typical landscape of western Montenegro. The town itself is located at the foot of the Trebjesa Hill.

The Zeta River originates in the Nikšić Field, and flows near the town of Nikšić, before it becomes a subterranean river south of the town. The river caused frequent flooding of the plain, until the construction of the Perućica Hydroelectric Power Plant in 1960. The construction of the power plant resulted in the creation of three large artificial lakes near the town—the Krupac, Slano and Vrtac Lakes.

== Settlements ==
- Balosave
- Bare
- Bastaji
- Bjeloševina
- Bobotovo Groblje
- Bogetići
- Bogmilovići
- Brestice
- Brezovik
- Broćanac Nikšicki
- Broćanac Viluški
- Bršno
- Bubrežak
- Busak
- Carine
- Cerovo
- Crnodoli
- Dolovi
- Donja Trepča
- Donje Čarađe
- Donje Crkvice
- Dragovoljići
- Drenoštica
- Duboćke
- Dučice
- Duga
- Gornja Trepča
- Gornje Čarađe
- Gornje Crkvice
- Gornje Polje
- Goslić
- Gradačka Poljana
- Grahovac
- Grahovo
- Granice
- Gvozd
- Ivanje
- Jabuke
- Jasenovo Polje
- Javljem
- Jugovići
- Kamensko
- Kazanci
- Klenak
- Koprivice
- Koravlica
- Kovači
- Kunak
- Kuside
- Kuta
- Laz
- Liverovići
- Lukovo
- Macavare
- Međeđe
- Miljanići
- Miločani
- Milojevići
- Miruše
- Mokri Do
- Morakovo
- Nudo
- Oblatno
- Orah
- Orlina
- Ozrinići
- Petrovići
- Pilatovići
- Počekovići
- Podbožur
- Podvrš
- Ponikvica
- Povija
- Praga
- Prigradina
- Prisoje
- Rastovac
- Riđani
- Riječani
- Rudine
- Šipačno
- Sjenokosi
- Smrduša
- Somina
- Spila
- Srijede
- Staro Selo
- Štedim
- Štitari
- Stuba
- Stubica
- Tupan
- Ubli
- Vasiljevići
- Velimlje
- Vidne
- Vilusi
- Vir
- Višnjica Do
- Vitasojevići
- Vraćenovići
- Vrbica
- Vučji Do
- Zagora
- Zagrad
- Zaljutnica
- Zaslap
- Zavrh
- Zlostup

== Local administration ==
=== City Assembly (2025–2029) ===
Party/Coalition	Seats	Local government
DPS	16 / 41	Opposition
ZBCG (NSD–DNP)	10 / 41	Government
PES	5 / 41	Government
DCG	3 / 41	Government
SNP	3 / 41	Government
SD	2 / 41	Opposition
UCG	1 / 41	Government
SCG	1 / 41	Government

== Demographics ==
Historical population
Year	Pop.	±% p.a.
1948	38,359	—
1953	46,589	+3.96%
1961	57,399	+2.64%
1971	66,815	+1.53%
1981	72,299	+0.79%
1991	74,706	+0.33%
2003	75,282	+0.06%
2011	72,443	−0.48%
2023	65,705	−0.81%

The 2011 census recorded a total population of 72,443. The inhabitants were largely divided between Montenegrins, numbering 46,149 (63.70%), and Serbs, numbering 18,334 (25.31%), the rest belonging to other ethnic groups (3,114: 4.30%) or opting undeclared (4,846: 6.67%). By language, 43,75% spoke Montenegrin, while 42,44% spoke Serbian. By religious affiliation, Eastern Orthodoxy was predominant (91,38%). The 2023 census recorded a total population of 65,705.

Nikšić (2023)
Montenegrins	59.46%
Serbs	33.89%
Undeclared	3.13%
Others	3.52%

Nikšić (2023)
Montenegrin	43.05%
Serbian	49.48%
Serbo-Croatian	2.38%
Undeclared	1.93%
Others	3.16%

Nikšić (2023)
Eastern Orthodoxy	93.25%
Muslims	2.35%
Roman Catholicism	0.29%
Undeclared	1.69%
Others	4.11%

== Gallery ==
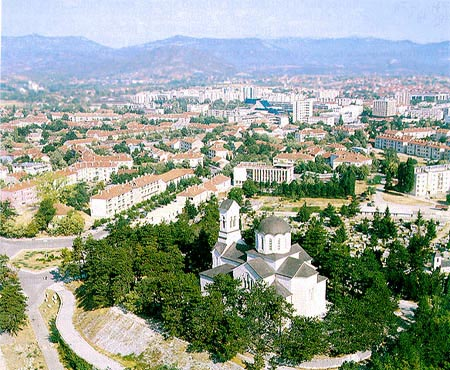
Town of Nikšić

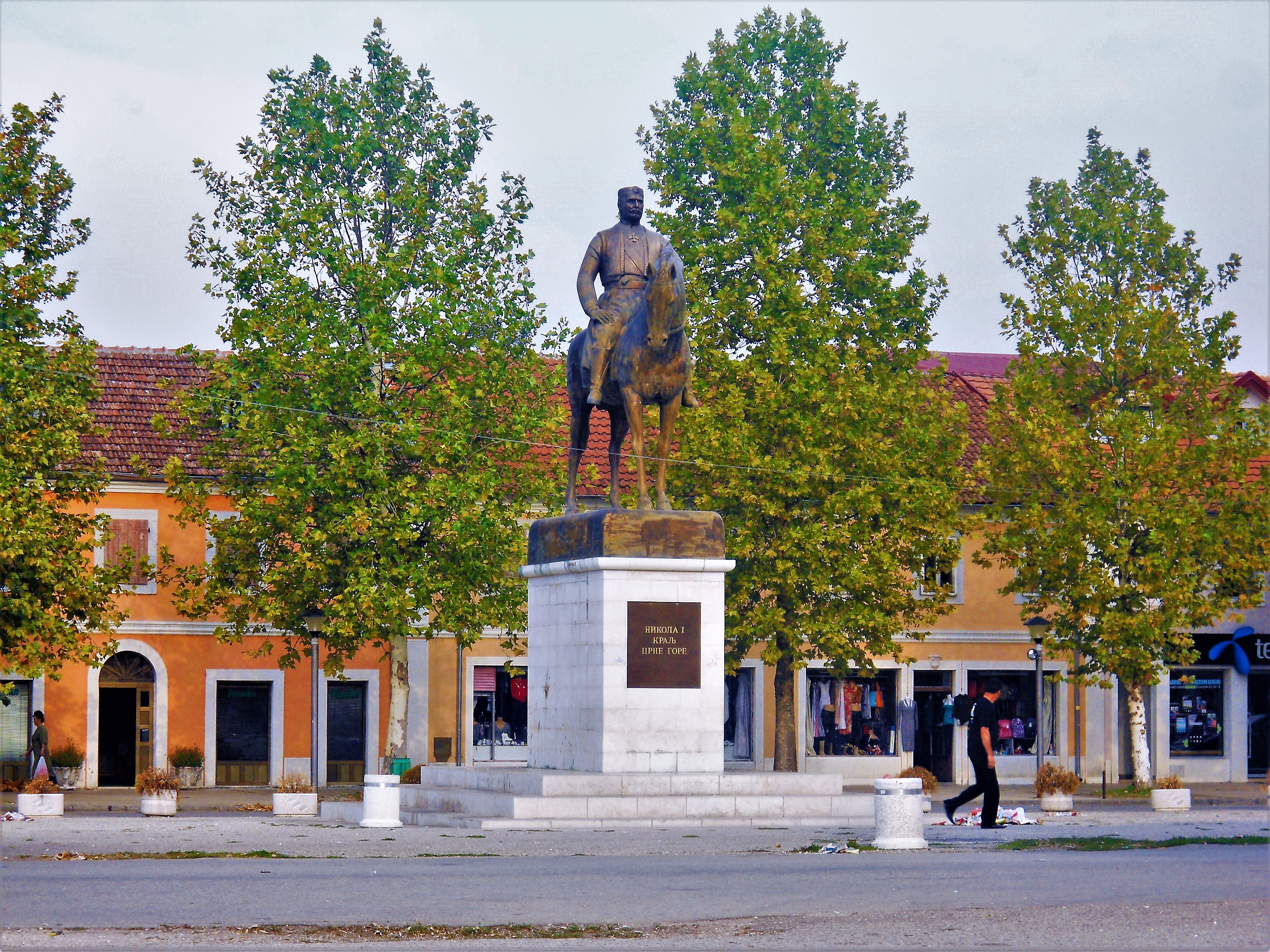
Freedom Square

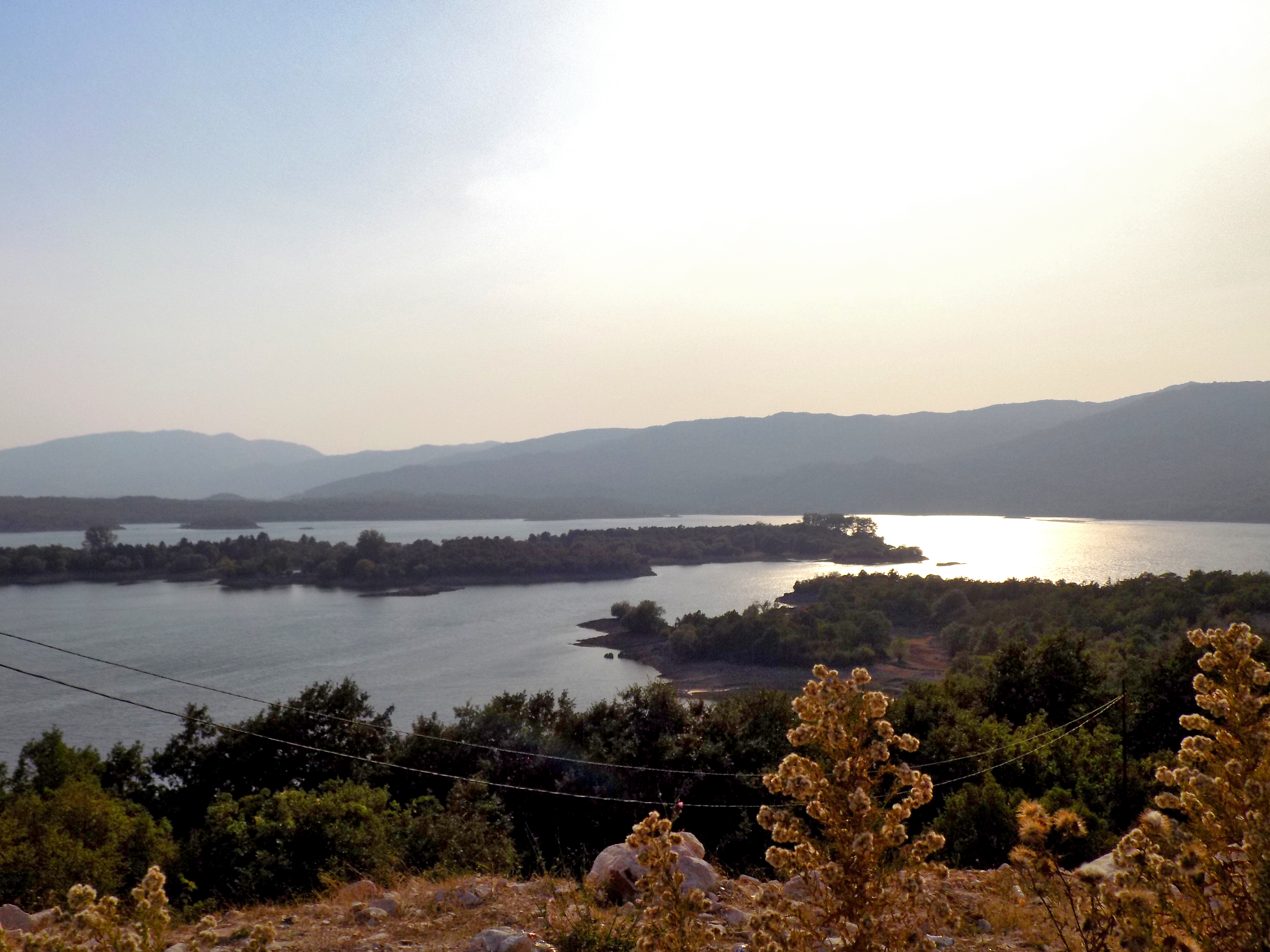
Krupac Lake near Nikšić

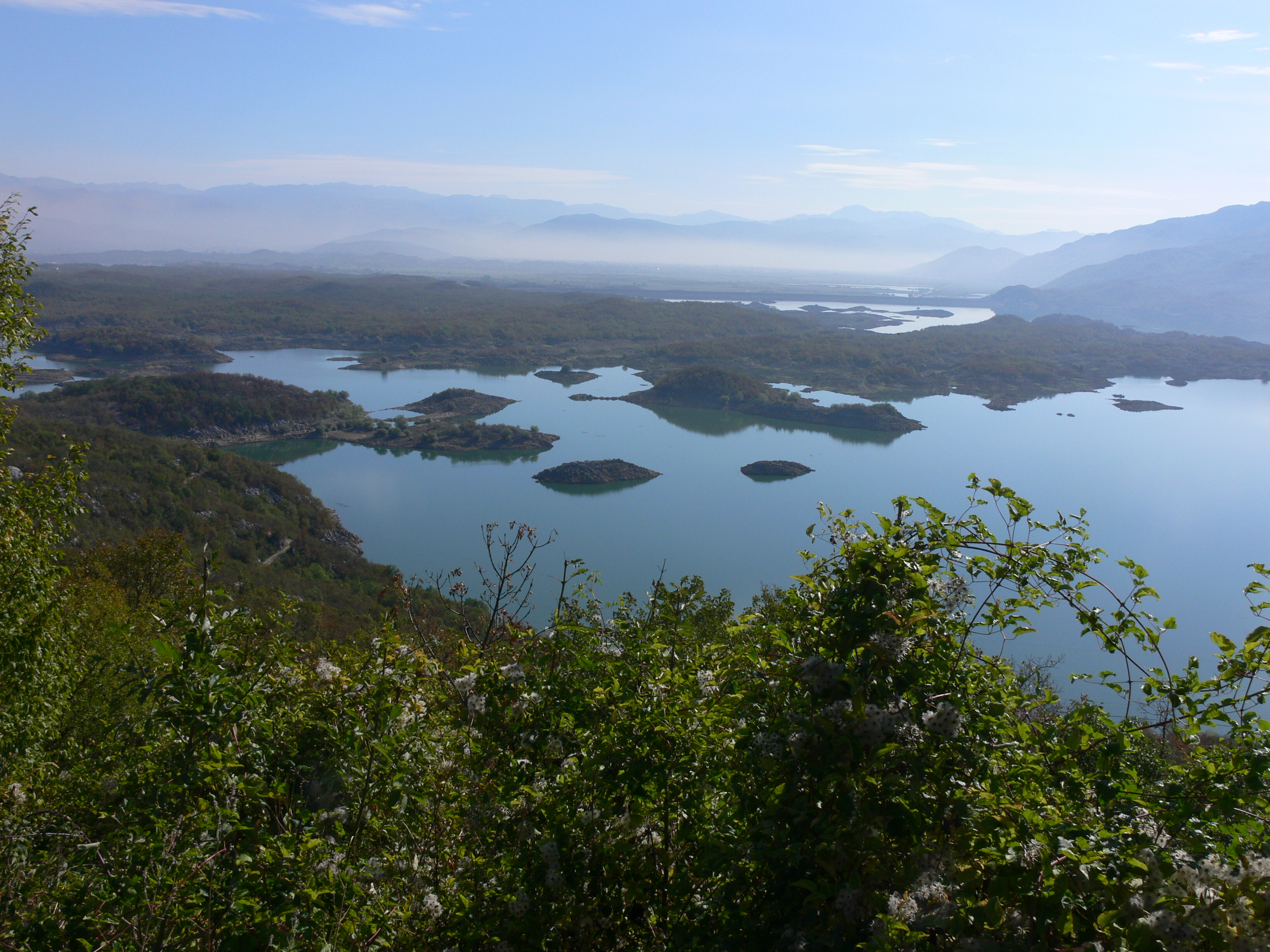
Lake Slansko near Nikšić

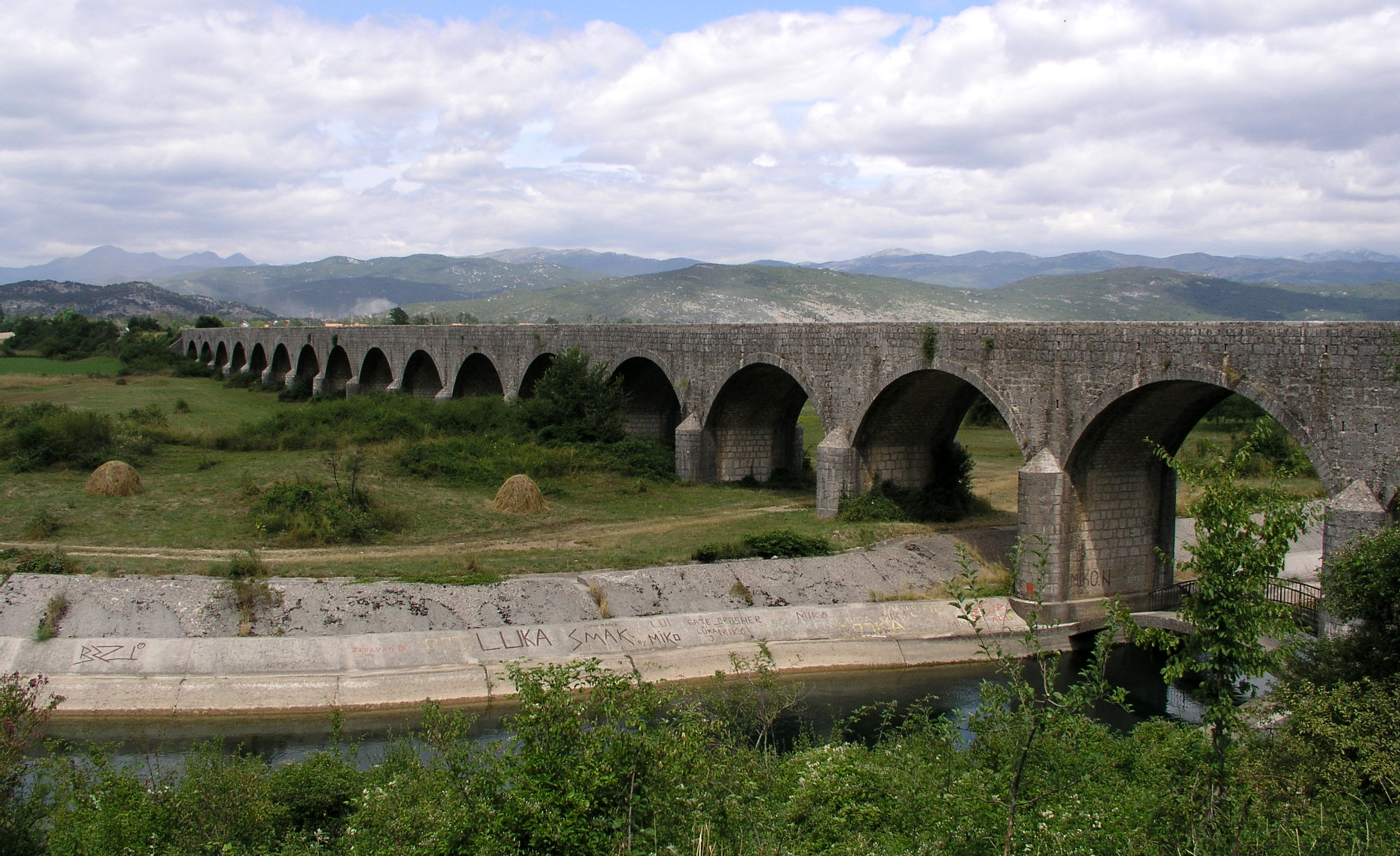
Tsar's Bridge, Zeta river

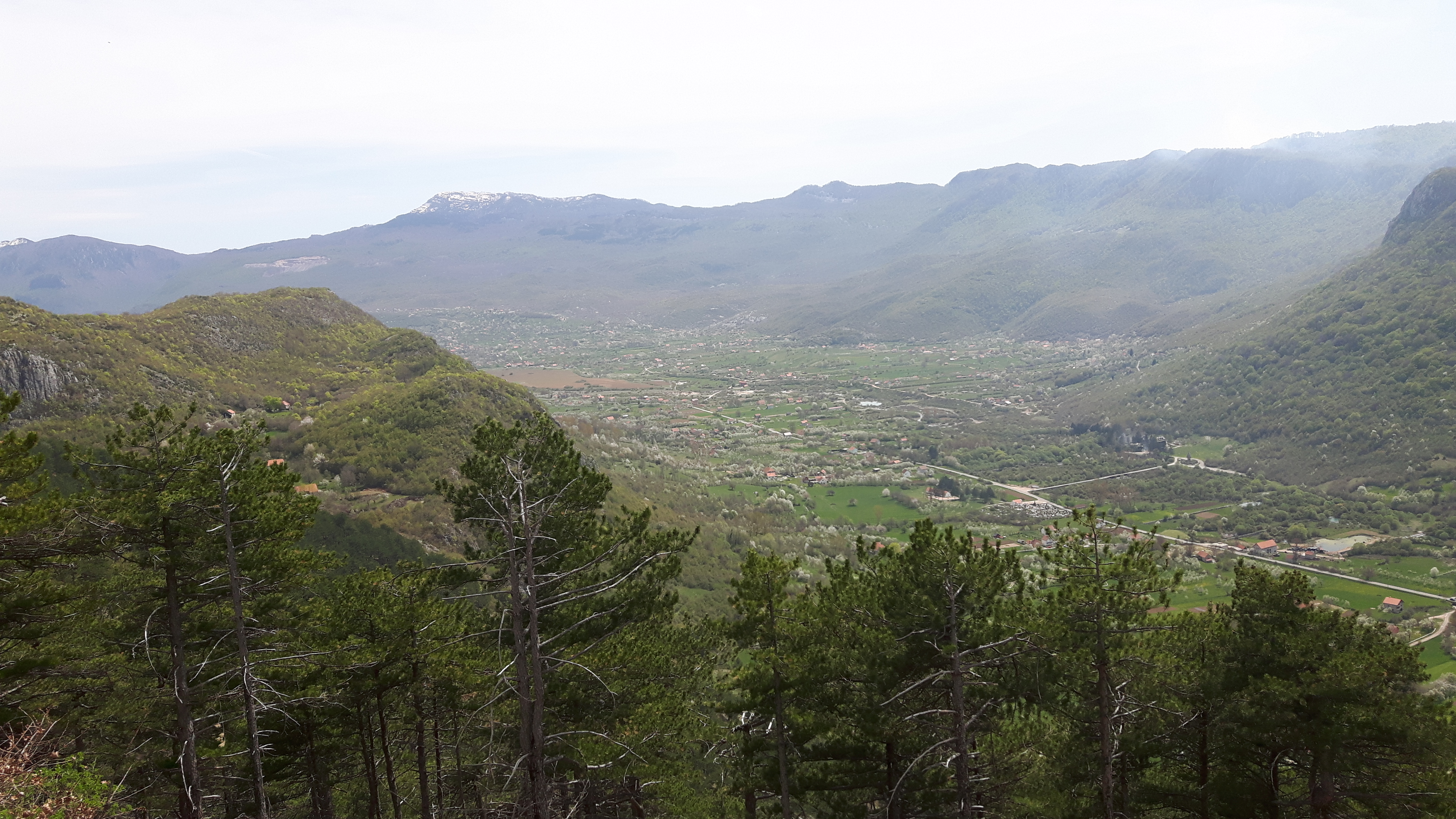
Župa Nikšićka Valley

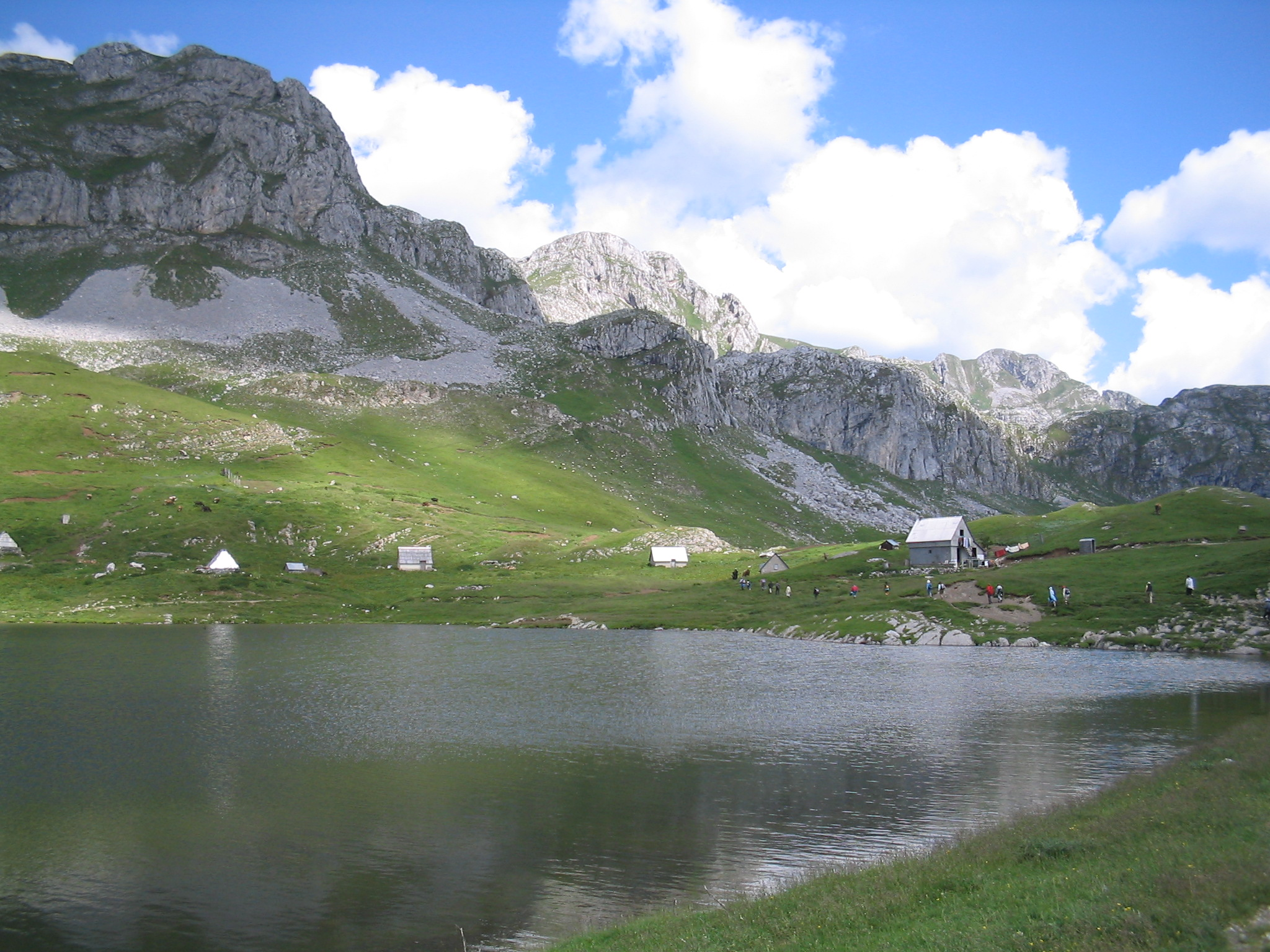
Kapetan Lake

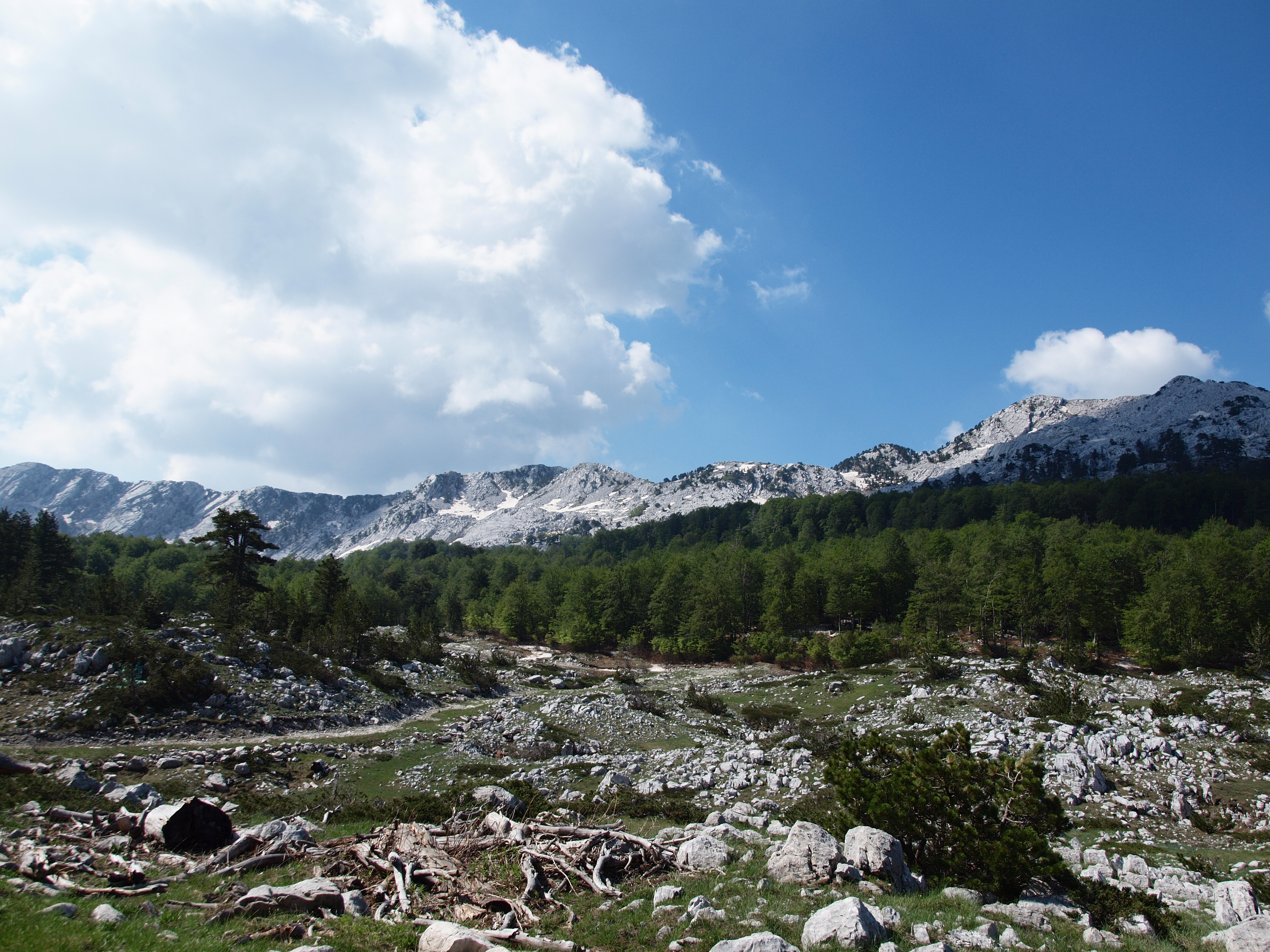
Bijela Gora
