= A-1 motorway (Montenegro) =

Motorway in Montenegro

A-1 motorway
- Autoput A-1
- Princess Xenia motorway

Route information
- Part of E-65 / E-80 / E-763
- Length: 165 km (103 mi)
- Existed: 13 July 2022–present

Major junctions
- South end: M-1 in Đurmani near Bar
- M-2 in Virpazar; M-2 in Bistrice; M-10 in Farmaci near Podgorica; M-3 in Tološi near Podgorica; M-2 in Smokovac near Podgorica; R-13 in Pelev Brijeg; R-13 in Veruša; R-13 in Mateševo; R-2 in Andrijevica; R-24 in Berane; M-5 in Crnča
- East end: A2 in Boljare (border with Serbia)

Location
- Country: Montenegro
- Municipalities: Bar, Podgorica, Kolašin, Andrijevica, Berane

Highway system
- Transport in Montenegro; Motorways
← R-24	→ M-1

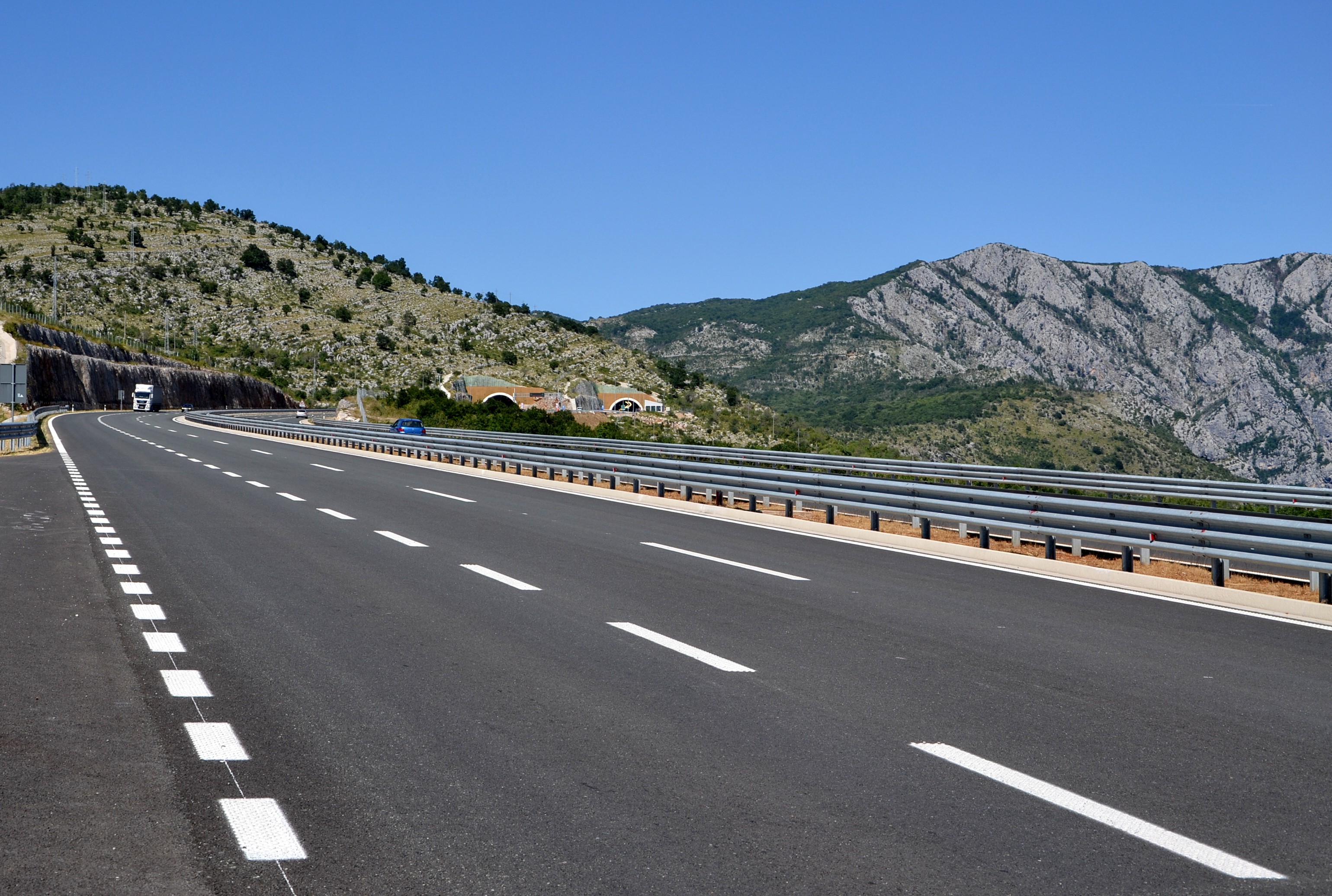
A-1 in July 2022

The A-1 motorway, called Princess Xenia motorway (Montenegrin: Auto-put Princeza Ksenija), named after the Princess Xenia of Montenegro, first female driver in the Balkans, is a motorway in Montenegro. This motorway is also known as the Bar-Boljare motorway (Montenegrin: Auto-put Bar — Boljare). In 2022, the first part of the motorway was open for public traffic, from Smokovac near Podgorica to Mateševo near Kolašin.

It is part of the larger international project between Montenegro and Serbia that connects to the Belgrade–Bar motorway in Serbia. The motorway will connect Belgrade with Podgorica and the harbour city of Bar, Montenegro's main seaport.

Italy, Montenegro and Serbia are lobbying to list the route as one of the Pan-European corridors, and it is frequently referred to as part of proposed Corridor XI, or 4B - an envisioned ferry/motorway corridor linking Bari, Bar, Belgrade and Bucharest.

The road's construction began on May 11, 2015 and the first 41km section opened on July 13, 2022 at a cost of $1 billion USD. The project cost was significantly higher than expected, partially due to payment being made in US dollars and thus subject to currency fluctuations. Other commonly cited reasons for the higher cost include the addition of a turnpike, delays in construction, local corruption, and Chinese lending practices under the Belt and Road Initiative.

A deal worth almost 700 million euros: Construction of the Mateševo–Andrijevica motorway section started since 26th of june.

Preparatory works on the second section of the Bar–Boljare motorway started since 26th of june in Mateševo, a project that is to connect the existing Smokovac–Mateševo route with Andrijevica and open a new phase of construction of the most important road in Montenegro. The section, approximately 22 to 23 kilometers long, will be built by the Chinese consortium PowerChina–STECOL–PCCD, with financing from the EBRD, the European Union and the state of Montenegro.

== Route description ==
The motorway is to be built in three phases:

- (Bar) Đurmani - Sozina tunnel - Virpazar - Bistrica - Šteke - Ćafa - Tološko polje - (Podgorica) Smokovac - this is the southernmost section of the motorway, that will link the Montenegrin capital of Podgorica with the main Montenegrin seaport in Bar. Potential investors, such as EBRD and EIB, were suggesting that this section should be built first, as it will likely have the biggest traffic volume following completion. The planned length of this section is 49 km.
- (Podgorica) Smokovac - Bioče - Pelev Brijeg - Lijeva Rijeka - Veruša - Mateševo - this middle section of the motorway has been started first, because of its significance as a link between Podgorica and northern Montenegro. The current road link (E65 and E80), carved into the Morača canyon, is a curvy mountainous road, which is very dangerous during the winter, and is a bottleneck in Montenego's road network. Thus, building this section first is a requirement in bidding documents presented by the Montenegrin government. This section has a length of 41 km, and is by far the most expensive section of the motorway, with a cost per kilometer estimated at over 20 million EUR.
- Mateševo - Andrijevica - Berane - Crnča - Boljare - Border with Serbia - this northernmost section of the motorway is likely to be completed only after progress is made on the Serbian section of the motorway south of Požega. The planned length of this section is 75 km.

== History ==
In October 2008 the Ministry of Sustainable Development and Tourism proposed a Detailed Zoning Plan of the Bar-Boljare Motorway. Before this, a small part of the first section was already built. On July 13, 2005, Montenegro's national day, the Sozina tunnel was opened. Together with the associated road north of the tunnel, it will eventually become a part of the motorway, after a second parallel road and tunnel is built.

The middle section of the motorway was made a priority by the government of Montenegro, and it was decided that this section would be built first. Tenders were invited to build this section. The bids were reviewed in March 2009, and the top bid came from the Croatian consortium, led by the Konstruktor company. Contracts were signed and the beginning of construction works was announced in June 2009. The official copening ceremony took place on October 15, 2009, in the village of Gornje Mrke north of Podgorica, attended by the then Prime Ministers of Montenegro (Milo Đukanović), Serbia (Mirko Cvetković) and Croatia (Jadranka Kosor). However the Croatian consortium failed to provide necessary bank guarantees on time, so the contract was cancelled eight months later.

The second best rated bidder, a consortium of the Greek company Aktor and the Israeli company Shikun & Binui was called in for negotiations by the government. After negotiations, it was agreed that Aktor/HCH consortium would build the two southern sections of the motorway for a price of 1.575 billion euro. The third and the northernmost section, from Mateševo to Boljare (border with Serbia), as well as the small strip across Lake Skadar, were to be the subject of further negotiations. However, the Greek-Israeli consortium also failed to provide bank guarantees, so the negotiations between the consortium and the government of Montenegro were ended in December 2010.

The Government of Montenegro began to explore financing options for motorway construction, including negotiations with Chinese investors. The possibility of China Road and Bridge Group and China Poly Group Corporation building the road, with the financial backing of Exim Bank of China, was explored. In January 2011, the Montenegrin Minister of Transport sent an official letter of invitation to the Poly Group.

In April 2013 discussions were still under way between the Montenegrin government and Chinese parties and an offer of US$1bn of financing by EXIM bank and the selection of a preferred construction consortium was announced in July 2013.

In December 2014 negotiations with Chinese partners successfully concluded.

In May 2015 work started on the first section in Montenegro, Smokovac-Uvač-Mateševo, expected to finish within 48 months.

== Status ==
The section between Smokovac near Podgorica and Mateševo near Kolašin is finished, and it is Montenegro's first full motorway section. Initially, construction was expected to be finished in May 2019. Later this was revised, and it has been opened in July 13, 2022.

The pillars of the Moračica bridge, the tallest bridge on the motorway, were finished in October 2017. The right tube of Klopot Tunnel is the first tunnel that was excavated on motorway on August 25, 2017. In 2017, tunnels Jabučki Krš (1370 m and 1430 m), Mrke (829 m and 800 m) and Vilac (815 m and 950 m) were also excavated.

In 2018, tunnels Mrki Krš (700 m each tube), Mala Trava (1900 m and 1884 m), Suka (600 m each tube) and Vežešnik (2474 m and 2414 m) were excavated. Longest tunnel in middle section of motorway, Vjeternik Tunnel (3039 m and 2852 m) was excavated on July 9, 2018.
