= Railway stations in Montenegro =

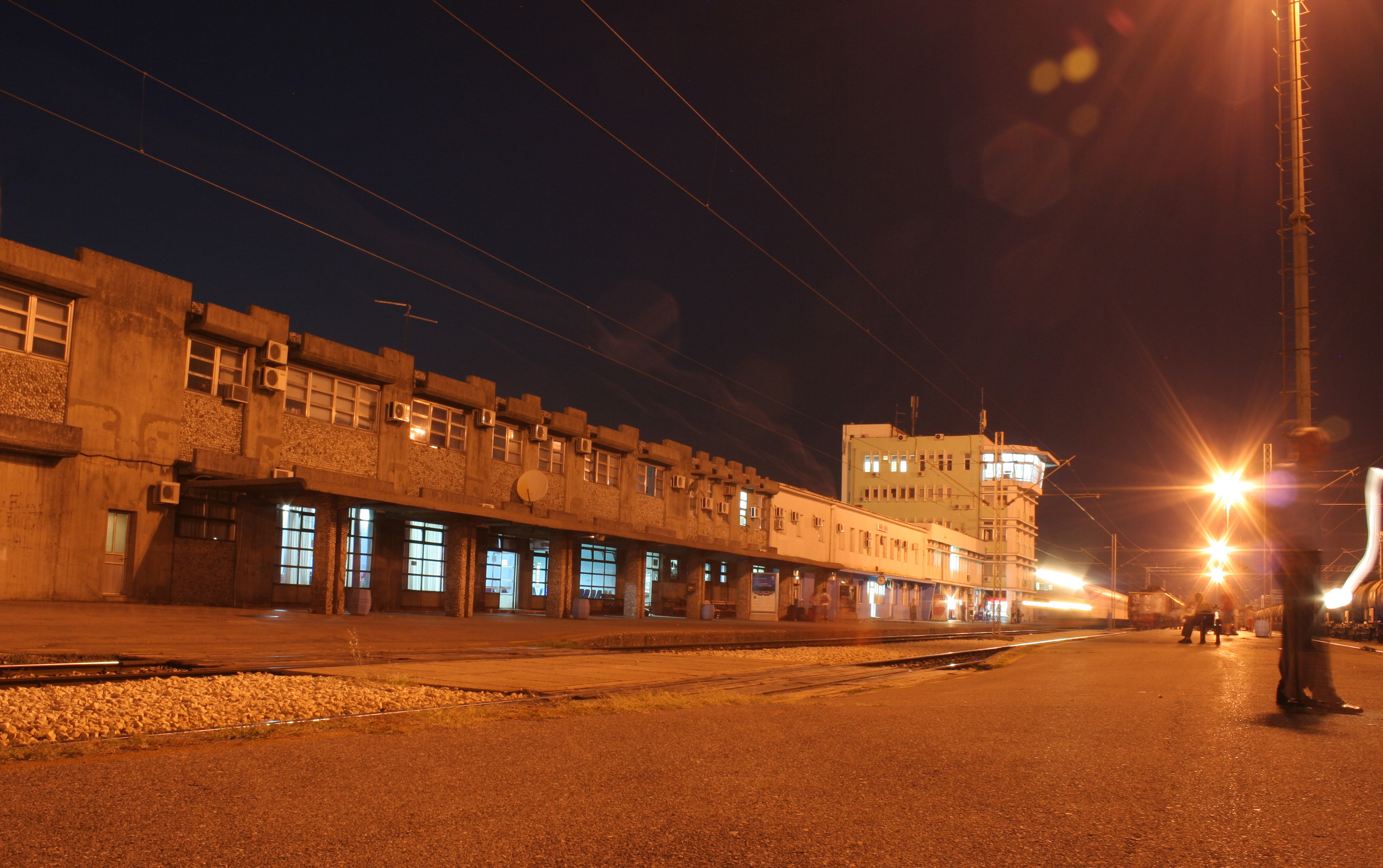
Podgorica railway station

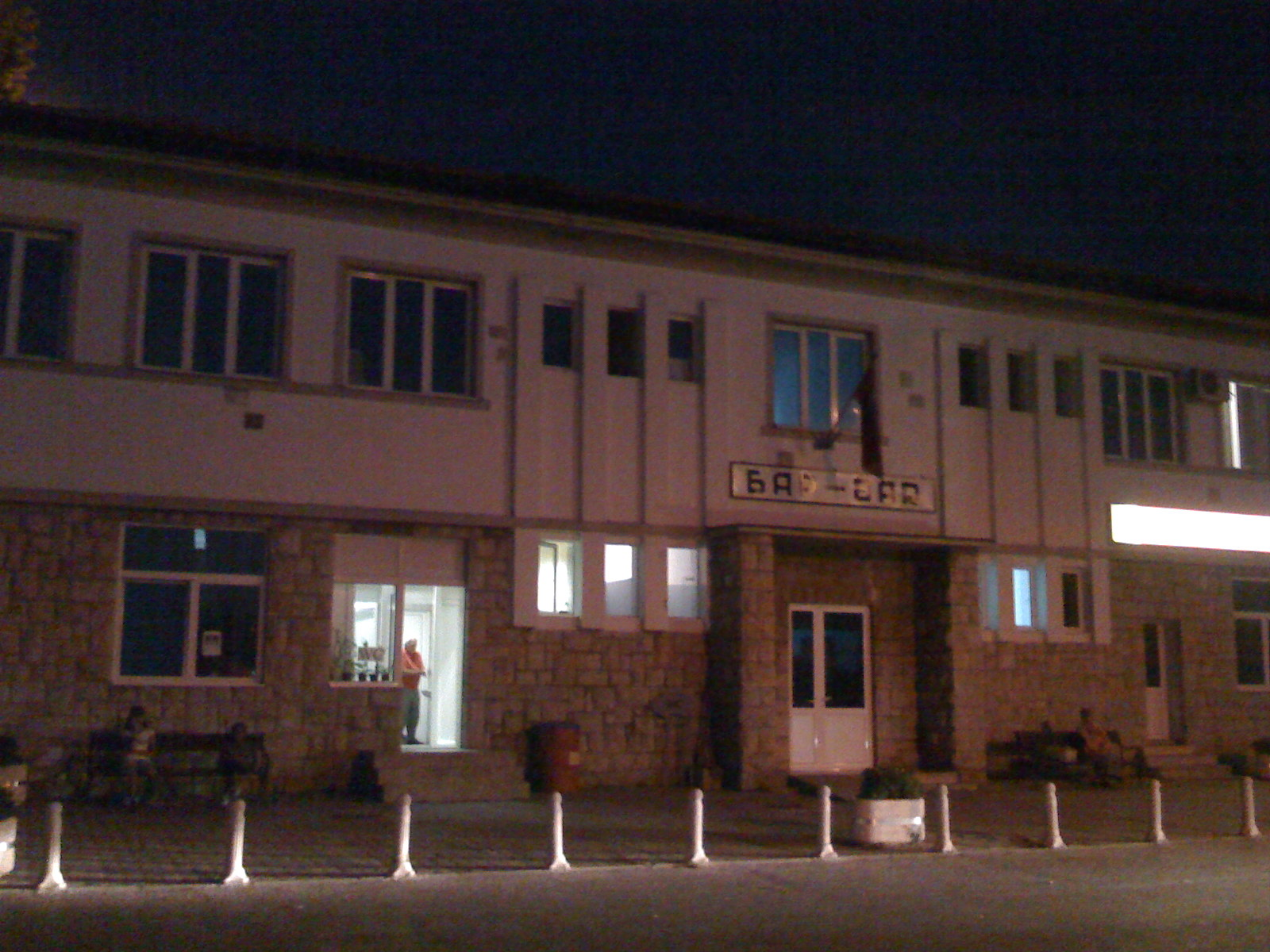
Bar railway station

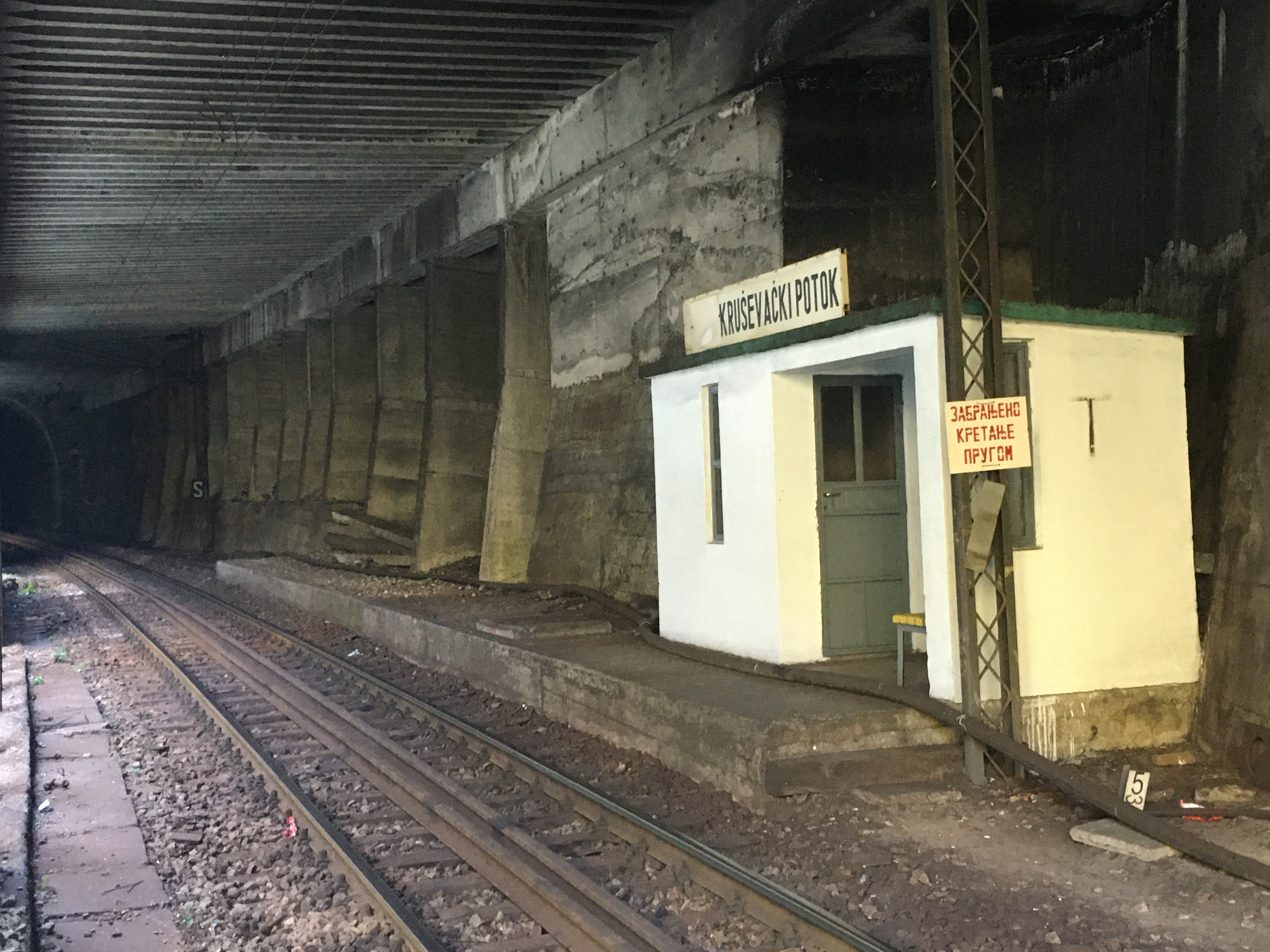
Kruševački Potok stanica (Željeznički prevoz Crne Gore)

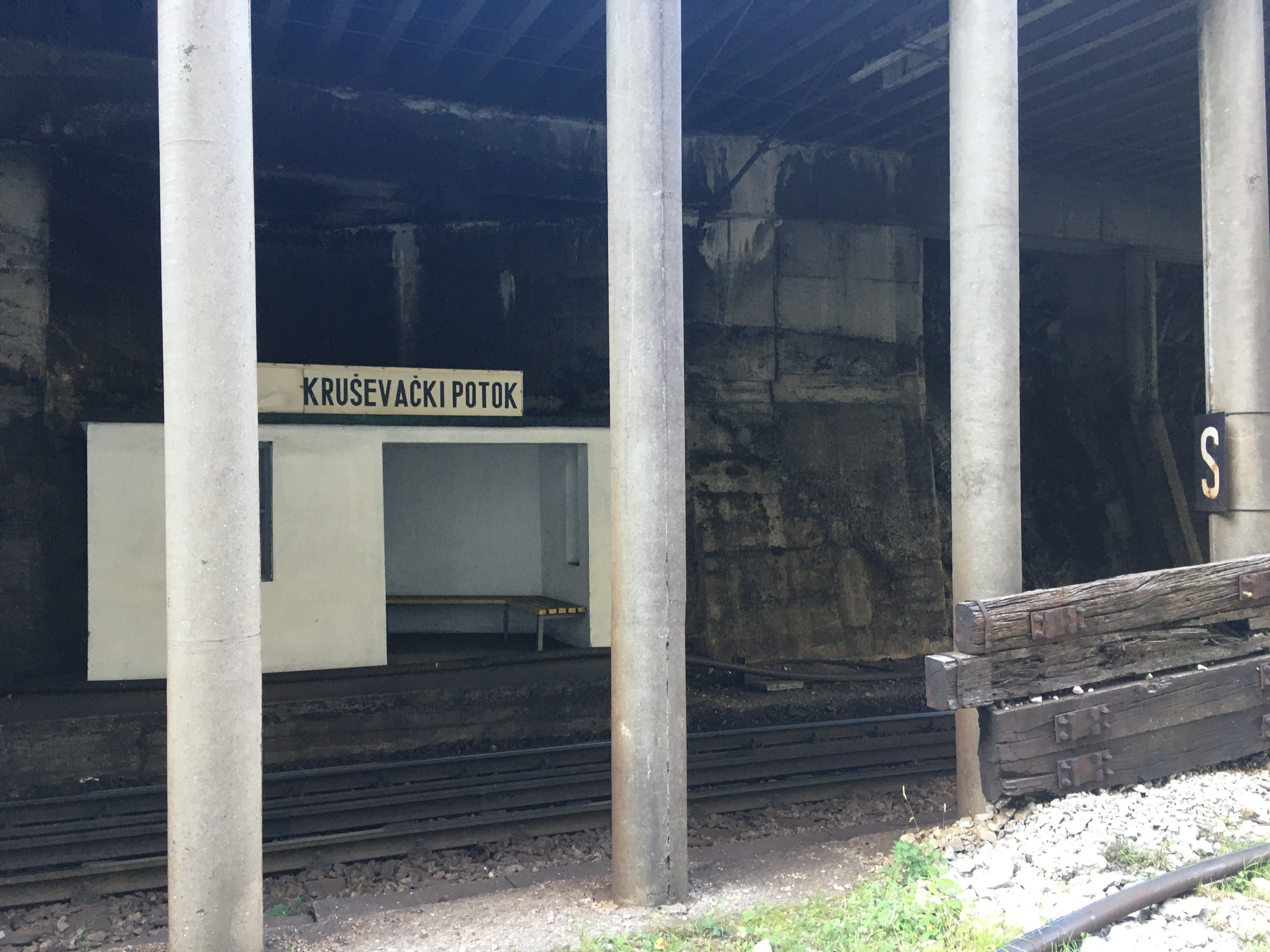
Sideview of Kruševački Potok stanica (Željeznički prevoz Crne Gore)

Railway stations in Montenegro include:

== Towns served by rail ==
=== Belgrade-Bar railway ===
Along the Montenegrin part of Belgrade–Bar railway, there are 5 railway stations and 31 train stops. They are listed here from north to south:

  - Sutivan
- Bijelo Polje
  - Lješnica
  - Kruševo
  - Ravna Rijeka
  - Slijepač Most
  - Mijatovo Kolo
  - Žari
- Mojkovac
  - Štitarička Rijeka
  - Trebaljevo
  - Oblutak
- Kolašin
  - Padež
  - Mateševo
  - Kos
  - Selište
  - Trebešica
  - Kruševački Potok
  - Lutovo
  - Pelev Brijeg
  - Bratonožići
  - Podkrš
  - Bioče
  - Zlatica
- Podgorica
  - Aerodrom
  - Golubovci
  - Morača
  - Zeta
  - Vranjina
  - Virpazar
  - Crmnica
  - Sutomore
  - Šušanj
- Bar

=== Nikšić-Podgorica railway ===
Along this line, there are 5 railway stations and 7 train stops:

- Nikšić
  - Stubica
  - Dabovići
- Ostrog
  - Šobajići
  - Bare Šumanovića
  - Slap
- Danilovgrad
  - Ljutotuk
- Spuž
  - Pričelje
- Podgorica

=== Podgorica–Shkodër railway ===
Along the Montenegrin part of this line, there is one train station and one train stop:

- Podgorica
  - Tuzi
