= R-2 regional road (Montenegro) =

Road in Montenegro

R-2 regional road
- Regionalni put R-2

Route information
- Length: 54.5 km (33.9 mi)

Major junctions
- North end: M-5 in Berane
- R-24 in Buča; R-19 in Andrijevica; R-9 in Murino

- South end: SH20 in Grnčar

Location
- Country: Montenegro
- Municipalities: Berane, Andrijevica, Plav, Gusinje

Highway system
- Transport in Montenegro; Motorways
← R-1	→ R-3

R-2 regional road (Montenegrin: Regionalni put R-2) is a Montenegrin roadway.

It serves as major connection between four eastern municipalities of Berane, Andrijevica, Plav, Gusinje. Section between Andrijevica and Berane will be a parallel road to section of Bar–Boljare motorway. As of 2017, no work has been done on this section of motorway.

== History ==
Section from Andrijevica to Murino was part of M-9 highway which was officially opened for traffic in 1984. It was built as part of the larger M-9 highway within the Yugoslav highway network, spanning Montenegro, Kosovo and Serbia. It connected Kolašin and Andrijevica with Peć and Priština in Kosovo, and Leskovac and Pirot in Serbia.

In January 2016, the Ministry of Transport and Maritime Affairs published bylaw on categorisation of state roads. With new categorisation, R-2 regional road was lengthened, and now it includes part of previous M-9 highway and complete previous R-9 regional road. M-9 highway was downgraded and split to several regional roads.

== Major intersections ==
Municipality	Location	km	mi	Destinations	Notes
Berane	Berane	0.0	0.0	M-5 – Bijelo Polje, Rožaje	
Berane	Buča	3.2	2.0	R-24 – Lubnice	
Andrijevica	Andrijevica	16.1	10.0	R-19 – Mateševo, Podgorica, Kolašin	
Plav	Murino, Plav	31	19	R-9 – Peć (Kosovo)	
Plav	Plav Municipality	39.7	24.7	Road passes by Lake Plav	
Gusinje	Gusinje	49	30	No major intersections	
Gusinje	Grnčar	54.5	33.9	SH20 – Koplik (Albania)	
1.000 mi = 1.609 km; 1.000 km = 0.621 mi
