= Stadion Ljajkovići =

Football stadium in Montenegro

- Interactive map of Stadion Ljajkovići
- Location: Ljajkovići, Zeta, Montenegro
- Coordinates: 42.365485°N 19.216810°E
- Owner: Urban Municipality of Golubovci
- Capacity: 0
- Surface: Grass

Construction
- Opened: 2007

Tenants
- FK Adria, FK Bratstvo

Stadion Ljajkovići is a football stadium in Ljajkovići (Urban Municipality of Golubovci), Podgorica Capital, Montenegro. It is the home ground of FK Adria and FK Bratstvo. The stadium does not have seats.

== History ==
Until 2007, FK Bratstvo played their home games in the village of Cijevna, near the Aluminium Plant Podgorica. But during 2007, a new stadium was built in the neighbouring village of Ljajkovići. Since then, FK Bratstvo plays all their games at Ljajkovići stadium.
The stadium meets criteria for Second League games, but not for top-league matches.

== See also ==
- FK Bratstvo Cijevna
- Golubovci
- Zeta Plain
- Podgorica
