= Belgrade–Bar motorway =

Motorway in Serbia and Montenegro

Belgrade–Bar Motorway
- Аутопут Београд - Бар; Autoput Beograd - Bar

Route information
- Length: 445 km (277 mi) Planned length

Major junctions
- From: Belgrade
- To: Bar

Location
- Countries: Serbia, Montenegro
- Major cities: Belgrade, Obrenovac, Čačak, Požega, Berane, Podgorica, Bar

Highway system
- International E-road network; A Class; B Class

Belgrade–Bar motorway (Serbian Cyrillic: Ауто-пут Београд–Бар, romanized: Auto-put Beograd–Bar) is a future motorway that will connect the Serbian capital of Belgrade and Bar, Montenegro's main seaport. Italy, Montenegro and Serbia are lobbying to list the route with Pan-European corridors, and it is frequently referred to as part of proposed Corridor XI, or 4B – an envisioned motorway/ferry corridor linking Bari, Bar, Belgrade and Bucharest.

From the Serbian side, the road's construction started in 2012 on a 40.3 kilometers-long section Ljig—Preljina on northern part of the route, which was put into service in 2016. From the Montenegrin side, the road's construction began on May 11, 2015.

The project became the subject of controversy in 2021 after revelations that loan agreements between China and Montenegro to finance the project had been the result of corruption, and that the terms of the agreement made it unrealistic that Montenegro would be able to meet its obligations under the deal.

== Serbian section ==
As the A1 motorway towards Skopje at the European route E75 approached completion in late 2010s, public attention has shifted towards the future highway connecting Belgrade with Montenegro, designated as A2. The motorway is envisioned as a local link as much as a transit link, connecting southwestern Serbia with Belgrade and the European road network.

=== Route description ===
Serbian section of the motorway can be roughly divided into two sections: Belgrade to Požega and Požega to Boljare, at the state border of Serbia and Montenegro.

The section of the road between Belgrade and Požega is 151.63 kilometers long and it will pass through the Serbian towns and municipalities of Ostružnica, Umka, Obrenovac, Ub, Lajkovac, Ljig, Takovo, Preljina (in the municipality of Čačak) and Požega. Total worth of the Belgrade–Preljina section is estimated to be at 889.8 million euros, and because of favorable terrain it will be the cheapest section of the motorway.

The southern section of the road from Požega to Boljare will cost at least 1.5 billion euros, for approximately 110 km (68 mi). The exact route of this section has not yet been determined.

=== Current progress ===
In Serbia, efforts to start the construction of the 146.37 km (90.95 mi) long section between Belgrade and Požega began in 2008, when a concession contract was signed with Alpine Mayreder and FCC Construction. Yet, Alpine and the Government of Serbia agreed to cancel the contract in August 2008.

In 2010, consortium of Serbian construction companies won the bidding for building of 12,5 km section between Ub and Lajkovac. On July 30, 2010, the work began and the construction is still underway. In August 2019 the complete section of 103 km from Obrenovac to Preljina was open to traffic. Section from Obrenovac to Surčin was opened on December 18, 2019. It is expected for the connection from New Belgrade to Surčin to be completed by 2022.

Section Preljina—Požega, A.K.A. E763, is a section which is currently finished construction and available for driving. It is 30,96 kilometers long. It was completed in June 2025 and opened 5 July 2025. It is features six kilometres of bridges, and six kilometres of tunnels. This also means that one third of the section will be tunnels and bridges.

The last section of A2 motorway is a section from Požega to border with Montenegro near Boljare. This section will be more than 100 kilometers long, and the exact route is still to be determined.

== Montenegrin section ==
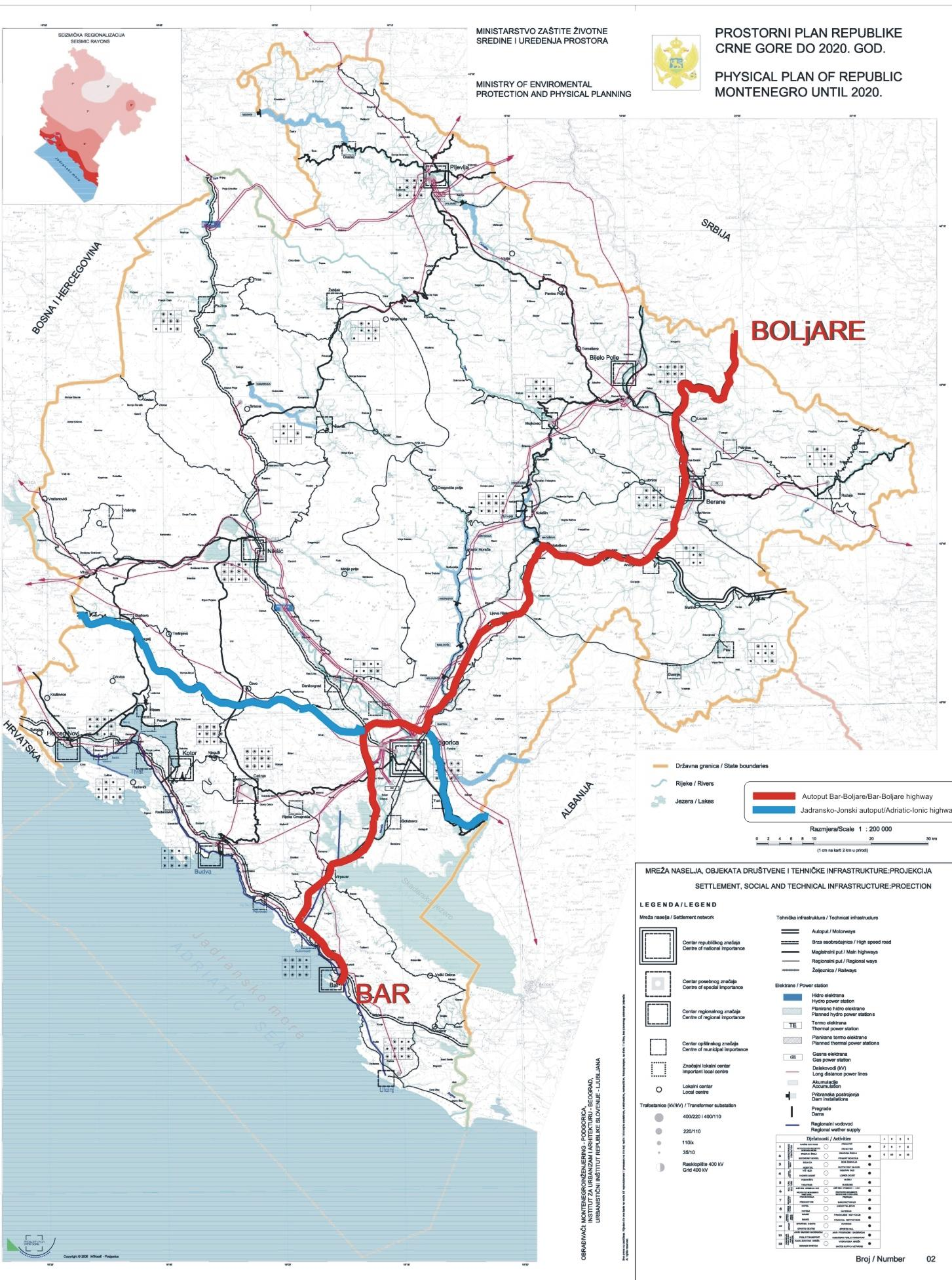
Corridors of future motorways in Montenegro. Bar-Boljare motorway is marked in red

The Montenegrin part of motorway is known as the Bar-Boljare motorway. It will be 165 km long, and by far the most expensive one, with an estimated cost of around 2 billion euros. The rugged mountainous terrain is an engineering challenge, with 50 tunnels and 95 bridges and viaducts planned along the section.

=== Route description ===
The Montenegrin part is to be built in three phases:

- (Bar) Đurmani – Sozina tunnel – Virpazar – Bistrica – Šteke – Ćafa – Tološko polje – (Podgorica) Smokovac: this is the southernmost section of the motorway, that will link the Montenegrin capital of Podgorica with the main seaport in Bar. Potential investors, such as EBRD and EIB, are suggesting that this section should be built first, as it will likely have the highest traffic volume following completion. The planned length of this section is 49 km.
- (Podgorica) Smokovac – Bioče – Pelev Brijeg – Lijeva Rijeka – Veruša – Mateševo: this middle section of the motorway is considered a priority, because of its significance as a link between Podgorica and northern Montenegro. The current road link (E65), carved into the Morača canyon, is a curvy mountainous road, considered dangerous during the winter, and is a bottleneck in Montenegrin road network. Thus, building this section first is a requirement in bidding documents presented by the Montenegrin Government. This section has a length of 41 km, and is by far the most expensive section of the motorway, with a cost per kilometer of motorway estimated to be higher than €20 million.
- Mateševo – Andrijevica – Berane – Crnča – Boljare: this northernmost section of the motorway is likely to be completed only after progress is made on the Serbian section of the motorway south of Požega. The planned length of this section is 75 km.

=== Current progress ===
The project is currently in construction bidding phase, and is devised as a public-private partnership. A general contractor that signs the contract with the Government of Montenegro is to finance the construction of the motorway, and conduct maintenance and collect toll fees and other incomes for a period of 30 years after completion. During that 30-year period, Government of Montenegro will pay off its share of financing through annuities.

The bidding offers were reviewed in March 2009, and the top bid came from the Croatian consortium, led by the company of Konstruktor. This was followed by signing of contract document, and announcing of the beginning of construction works in June 2009. The official construction works opening ceremony happened on October 15, 2009, in the village of Gornje Mrke north of Podgorica, attended by the Prime Ministers of Montenegro (Milo Đukanović), Serbia (Mirko Cvetković) and Croatia (Jadranka Kosor). However, the Croatian consortium failed to provide necessary bank guarantees in a timely manner, so the contract was cancelled eight months later.

The second best rated bidder, a consortium of the Greek company Aktor and the Israeli company Shikun & Binui was called in for negotiations by the Government. After negotiations, it was agreed that Aktor/HCH consortium builds two southern sections of the motorway for a price of 1.575 billion euro. The third and the northernmost section, from Mateševo to Boljare, as well as the small strip across the Lake Skadar, were to be the subject of further negotiations. However, the Greek-Israeli consortium also failed to provide bank guarantees, so the negotiations between the consortium and the Government of Montenegro were ended in December 2010.

The Government of Montenegro began to explore financing options for motorway construction, including negotiations with Chinese investors. The possibility of China Road and Bridge Group and China Poly Group Corporation building the road, with the financial backing of Exim Bank of China, was mentioned in the Montenegrin media. In January 2011, the Montenegrin Minister of Transportation had sent an official letter of invitation to the Poly Group, and the negotiations were underway. If the negotiations came through, the terms of building and financing would be established via treaty, thus avoiding the bidding process and discarding the public-private partnership option.

In April 2013, discussions were still under way between the Montenegrin government and Chinese parties and an offer of US$1bn of financing by EXIM bank and the selection of a preferred construction consortium was announced in July 2013 and with detailed commercial negotiations underway since.

In December 2014, negotiations with Chinese partners had successfully concluded.

In May 2015, works on first section in Montenegro, Smokovac–Uvač–Mateševo had started, expected to finish within 48 months. After 48 months of building, the motorway was not finished due to terrain, and was further slowed due to the COVID-19 pandemic, but after seven years of construction, the first section was completed. It was not opened for vehicles because of the reconstruction of regional road R-13 due to the number of workers commuting to the motorway for its construction. Reconstruction included widening, safety improvements, asphalt paving, and a new bridge near Mateševo, was completed in October 2022.

A deal worth almost 700 million euros: Construction of the Mateševo–Andrijevica motorway section started since 26th of june.

Preparatory works on the second section of the Bar–Boljare motorway started since 26th of June in Mateševo, a project that is to connect the existing Smokovac–Mateševo route with Andrijevica and open a new phase of construction of the most important road in Montenegro. The section, approximately 22 to 23 kilometers long, will be built by the Chinese consortium PowerChina–STECOL–PCCD, with financing from the EBRD, the European Union and the state of Montenegro.
