= Babljak =

Babljak may refer to:

- Babljak (Rogatica), Bosnia and Herzegovina
- Babljak, Kolašin, Montenegro
