= R-19 regional road (Montenegro) =

Road in Montenegro

R-19 regional road
- Regionalni put R-19

Route information
- Length: 34.7 km (21.6 mi)
- Existed: 1984–present

Major junctions
- West end: R-13 in Mateševo
- East end: R-2 in Andrijevica

Location
- Country: Montenegro
- Municipalities: Kolašin, Andrijevica

Highway system
- Transport in Montenegro; Motorways
← R-18	→ R-20

R-19 regional road (Montenegrin: Regionalni put R-19) (previously part of M-9 highway) is a Montenegrin roadway.

This road will be a parallel road to section of Bar–Boljare motorway from Mateševo to Andrijevica. As of 2026, work has been started on this section.

== History ==
The M-9 highway was officially opened for traffic in 1984. It was built as part of the larger M-9 highway within the Yugoslav highway network, spanning Montenegro, Kosovo and Serbia. It connected Kolašin and Andrijevica with Peć and Priština in Kosovo, and Leskovac and Pirot in Serbia. Following the breakup of Yugoslavia, the segment between Murino and Peć was closed during the Kosovo War in 1999. In 2010, work began on asphalting 10 kilometres of the road between Murino and Čakor, with the intention of reopening the road for vehicular traffic. An additional 12 kilometres of road was planned to be asphalted between Čakor and the Kosovar border.

The M-9 highway originally flowed through the city of Kolašin to connect it to the M-2 highway. A bypass was built via the Vladoš Bridge to merge the M-9 with the M-2. On 27 March 2014, the Ministry of Transport and Maritime Affairs officially realigned the M-9 highway to its current alignment, incorporating the Vladoš Bridge, while downgrading the M-9's former path through Kolašin as a municipal road.

In January 2016, the Ministry of Transport and Maritime Affairs published bylaw on categorisation of state roads. With new categorisation, R-19 highway was created, from part of previous M-9 highway.

== Major intersections ==
Municipality	Location	km	mi	Destinations	Notes
Kolašin	Mateševo	0.0	0.0	R-13 – Kolašin, Podgorica	
Andrijevica	Trešnjevik	17.0	10.6	Mountain pass Trešnjevik 1570 MASL	
Andrijevica	Andrijevica	34.7	21.6	R-2 – Berane	
1.000 mi = 1.609 km; 1.000 km = 0.621 mi
