= R-13 regional road (Montenegro) =

Road in Montenegro

R-13 regional road
- Regionalni put R-13

Route information
- Length: 59.3 km (36.8 mi)

Major junctions
- South end: M-2 in Bioče
- R-19 in Mateševo
- North end: M-2 in Kolašin

Location
- Country: Montenegro
- Municipalities: Podgorica, Kolašin

Highway system
- Transport in Montenegro; Motorways
← R-12.1	→ R-14

R-13 regional road (Montenegrin: Regionalni put R-13) is a Montenegrin roadway.

Section from Bioče to Mateševo is a parallel road to section of Bar–Boljare motorway that was finished in 2022. When this section of Bar–Boljare motorway was finished, R-13 regional road section from Mateševo to Kolašin would serve as a major connection from motorway to the M-2 highway.

== History ==
The M-9 highway was officially opened for traffic in 1984. It was built as part of the larger M-9 highway within the Yugoslav highway network, spanning Montenegro, Kosovo and Serbia. It connected Kolašin and Andrijevica with Peć and Priština in Kosovo, and Leskovac and Pirot in Serbia.

The M-9 highway originally flowed through the city of Kolašin to connect it to the M-2 highway. A bypass was built via the Vladoš Bridge to merge the M-9 with the M-2. On 27 March 2014, the Ministry of Transport and Maritime Affairs officially realigned the M-9 highway to its current alignment, incorporating the Vladoš Bridge, while downgrading the M-9's former path through Kolašin as a municipal road.

In January 2016, the Ministry of Transport and Maritime Affairs published bylaw on categorisation of state roads. With new categorisation, R-13 regional road was created from previous R-19 regional road and section of previous M-9 highway from Mateševo to Kolašin.

== Major intersections ==
Municipality	Location	km	mi	Destinations	Notes
Podgorica	Bioče	0.0	0.0	M-2 – Podgorica	
Kolašin	Mateševo	50.4	31.3	R-19 – Andrijevica, Berane	
Kolašin	Kolašin	59.3	36.8	M-2 – Kolašin	bypass over Vladoš bridge
1.000 mi = 1.609 km; 1.000 km = 0.621 mi
