= Donje Lipovo =

Donje Lipovo Доње Липово
- Village
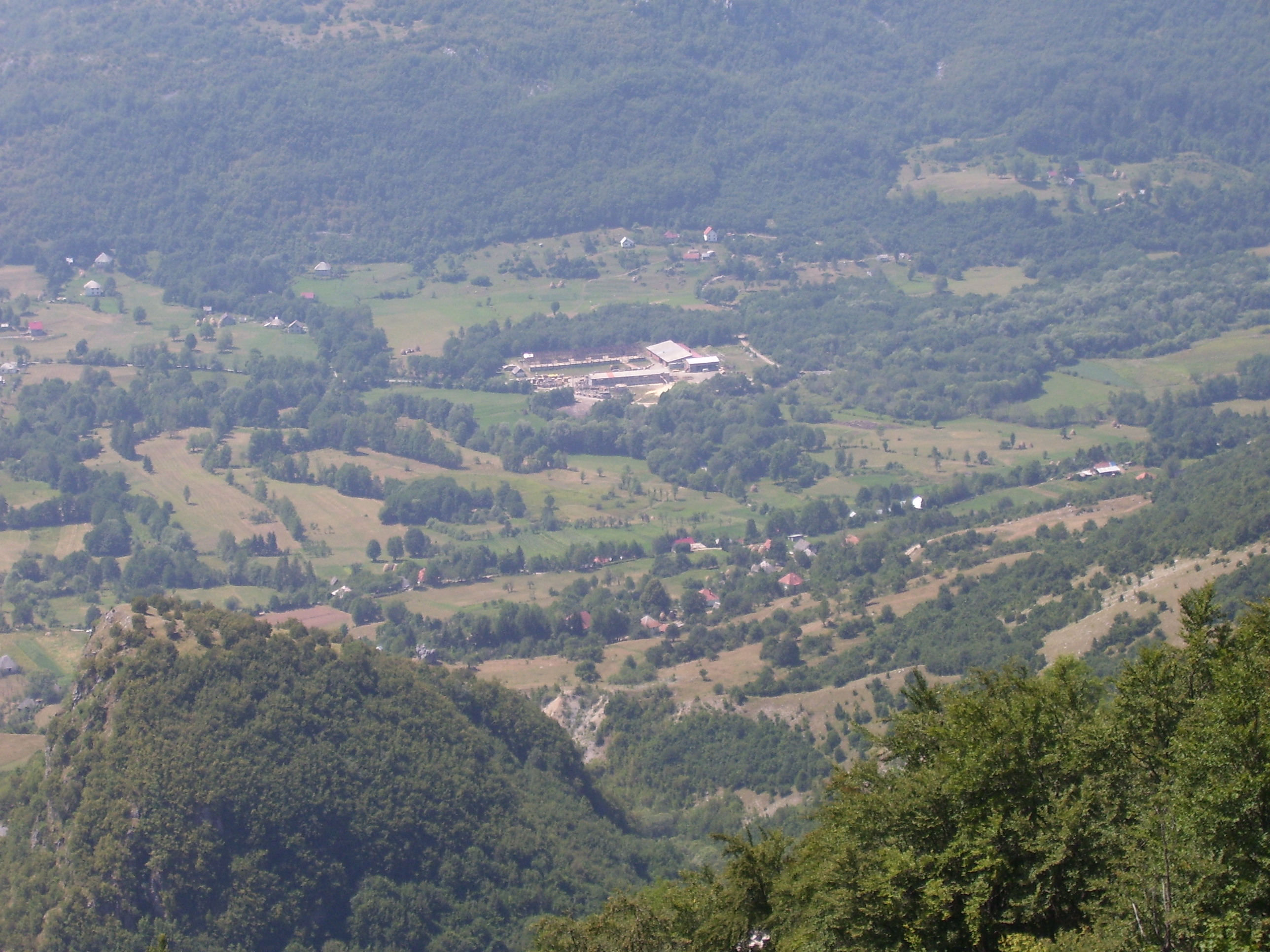

- Location within Montenegro
- Coordinates: 42°51′47″N 19°27′54″E
- Country: Montenegro
- Region: Northern
- Municipality: Kolašin

Population (2011)
  - Total: 123
- Time zone: UTC+1 (CET)
  - Summer (DST): UTC+2 (CEST)

Donje Lipovo (Montenegrin Cyrillic: Доње Липово) is a village in the municipality of Kolašin, Montenegro.

== Demographics ==
According to the 2011 census, its population was 123.

Ethnicity in 2011
Ethnicity	Number	Percentage
Montenegrins	84	68.3%
Serbs	34	27.6%
other/undeclared	5	4.1%
Total	123	100%
