= R19 =

R19 may refer to:

- HMS Zephyr (R19), a destroyer of the Royal Navy
- R19: May form explosive peroxides, a risk phrase
- R-19 regional road (Montenegro)
- Renault 19, a French automobile
- Samsung Sens R19, a laptop
- USS R-19 (SS-96), a submarine of the United States Navy
