= Smailagića Polje =

Smailagića Polje Смаилагића Поље
- Village
- Location within Montenegro
- Coordinates: 42.824134°N 19.537211°E
- Country: Montenegro
- Region: Northern
- Municipality: Kolašin

Population (2011)
  - Total: 864
- Time zone: UTC+1 (CET)
  - Summer (DST): UTC+2 (CEST)

Smailagića Polje (Montenegrin Cyrillic: Смаилагића Поље) is a village in the municipality of Kolašin, Montenegro.

== Demographics ==
According to the 2003 census, the town had a population of 937 people.

According to the 2011 census, its population was 864.

Ethnicity in 2011
Ethnicity	Number	Percentage
Montenegrins	484	56.0%
Serbs	301	34.8%
other/undeclared	79	9.1%
Total	864	100%
