= Dulovine =

- Village
- Location within Montenegro
- Coordinates: 42.818678°N 19.526222°E
- Country: Montenegro
- Region: Northern
- Municipality: Kolašin

Population (2011)
  - Total: 112
- Time zone: UTC+1 (CET)
  - Summer (DST): UTC+2 (CEST)

Dulovine (Montenegrin Cyrillic: Дуловине) is a small village in the municipality of Kolašin, Montenegro.

== Demographics ==
According to the 2011 census, its population was 112.

Ethnicity in 2011
Ethnicity	Number	Percentage
Montenegrins	58	51.8%
Serbs	52	46.4%
other/undeclared	2	1.8%
Total	112	100%
