= Babljak, Kolašin =

Babljak
- Village
- Location within Montenegro
- Coordinates: 42.833493°N 19.513210°E
- Country: Montenegro
- Region: Northern
- Municipality: Kolašin

Population (2011)
  - Total: 194
- Time zone: UTC+1 (CET)
  - Summer (DST): UTC+2 (CEST)

Babljak (Montenegrin Cyrillic: Бабљак) is a village in the municipality of Kolašin, Montenegro.

== Demographics ==
According to the 2011 census, its population was 194.

Ethnicity in 2011
Ethnicity	Number	Percentage
Serbs	116	59.8%
Montenegrins	62	32.0%
other/undeclared	16	18.2%
Total	194	100%
