= Bistrice, Montenegro =

Bistrice Бистрице
- Village
- Location within Montenegro
- Country: Montenegro
- Municipality: Podgorica

Population (2011)
  - Total: 316
- Time zone: UTC+1 (CET)
  - Summer (DST): UTC+2 (CEST)

Bistrice (Serbian Cyrillic: Бистрице) is a village in the new Zeta Municipality of Montenegro. Until 2022, it was part of Podgorica Municipality.

== Demographics ==
According to the 2011 census, its population was 316.

Ethnicity in 2011
Ethnicity	Number	Percentage
Montenegrins	189	59.8%
Serbs	97	30.7%
other/undeclared	30	9.5%
Total	316	100%
