= R-9 regional road (Montenegro) =

Roadway

R-9 regional road
- Regionalni put R-9

Route information
- Length: 35.4 km (22.0 mi)

Major junctions
- West end: R-2 in Murino
- East end: M-9 in Bjeluha

Location
- Country: Montenegro
- Municipalities: Plav

Highway system
- Transport in Montenegro; Motorways
← R-8	→ R-10

R-9 regional road (Montenegrin: Regionalni put R-9) (previously part of M-9 highway) is a Montenegrin roadway.

It serves as an extension to R-2 regional road to connect it with Peć, Kosovo. It is notorious for being very often blocked by snow during winter. The Kosovo part of the road is M-9.

== History ==
The M-9 highway was officially opened for traffic in 1984. It was built as part of the larger M-9 highway within the Yugoslav highway network, spanning Montenegro, Kosovo and Serbia. It connected Kolašin and Andrijevica with Peć and Priština in Kosovo, and Leskovac and Pirot in Serbia.

Following the breakup of Yugoslavia, the segment between Murino and Peć was closed during the Kosovo War in 1999. In 2010, work began on asphalting 10 kilometres of the road between Murino and Čakor, with the intention of reopening the road for vehicular traffic. An additional 12 kilometres of road was planned to be asphalted between Čakor and the Kosovar border.

In January 2016, the Ministry of Transport and Maritime Affairs published bylaw on categorisation of state roads. With new categorisation, part of previous M-9 regional road was recategorised as regional road and was given designation R-5 regional road.

== Major intersections ==
Municipality	Location	km	mi	Destinations	Notes
Plav	Murino, Plav	0.0	0.0	R-2 – Plav, Montenegro, Andrijevica	
Plav	Bjeluha	35.4	22.0	M-9 - Peć (Kosovo)	Border crossing with Kosovo
1.000 mi = 1.609 km; 1.000 km = 0.621 mi
