= R-24 regional road (Montenegro) =

Road in Montenegro

R-24 regional road
- Regionalni put R-24

Route information
- Length: 10.3 km (6.4 mi)

Major junctions
- East end: R-2 in Buča
- West end: Lubnice

Location
- Country: Montenegro
- Municipalities: Berane

Highway system
- Transport in Montenegro; Motorways
← R-23	→ R-25

R-24 regional road (Montenegrin: Regionalni put R-24) is a Montenegrin roadway.

This road was reconstructed in 2015. Together with another reconstructed road in 2010, Kolašin-Jezerine, and with section Jezerine-Lubnice completed in 2024, it forms a new regional road that would serve as a connection between Kolašin and Berane, making this trip shorter by some 40 km.

== History ==
In January 2016, the Ministry of Transport and Maritime Affairs published bylaw on categorisation of state roads. With new categorisation, R-24 regional road was created from municipal road.

== Major intersections ==
Municipality	Location	km	mi	Destinations	Notes
Berane	Buča	0.0	0.0	R-2 – Berane, Andrijevica	Buča is a village at outskirts of Berane
Berane	Lubnice	10.3	6.4	No major intersection	
1.000 mi = 1.609 km; 1.000 km = 0.621 mi
