= Jezerine =

Coordinates: 45°40′N 15°28′E

- Village
- Interactive map of Jezerine
- Country: Croatia
- County: Zagreb County
- Municipality: Krašić

Area
  - Total: 0.9 km^{2} (0.35 sq mi)

Population (2021)
  - Total: 22
  - Density: 24/km^{2} (63/sq mi)
- Time zone: UTC+1 (CET)
  - Summer (DST): UTC+2 (CEST)

Jezerine is a village in Croatia.
