= Aluminium Plant Podgorica =

Montenegrin aluminium smelter company

Uniprom KAP
- Type: Joint-stock company
- Traded as: MNSE: KAPG
- Industry: Metallurgy
- Founded: 9 April 2014; 12 years ago (Current form); 1969; 57 years ago (Founded)
- Headquarters: Dajbabe bb, Podgorica, Montenegro
- Area served: Montenegro, Germany, Poland, Czech Republic
- Key people: Veselin Pejović (CEO)
- Products: Aluminium; Aluminium alloys; Alumina
- Production output: 38,400 tonnes of aluminium T-ingots (2016)
- Revenue: ▲€0.06 million (2016)
- Net income: ▼ (€0.90 million) (2016)
- Total assets: ▼€24.10 million (2017)
- Total equity: ▲€23.96 million (2017)
- Owner: Uniprom (100%)
- Number of employees: 550 (2017)
- Website: uniprom.me/en/

The Aluminium Plant Podgorica (Montenegrin: Комбинат aлуминијума Подгорица, romanized: Kombinat aluminijuma Podgorica, abbr. KAP), also known latterly as Uniprom KAP, is a Montenegrin aluminium smelter company located in Podgorica, Montenegro. The Uniprom KAP operating countries of Germany, Poland and the Czech Republic.

== Synopsis ==
The KAP produces its own alumina, extracting it via the Bayer process out of the bauxite shipped from the Nikšić bauxite mine. The factory also has its own production of pre-baked anodes. The smelter has an installed capacity of 120,000 tons of liquid aluminum per year.

KAP is connected by railway with bauxite mines near Nikšić and the Port of Bar, and the Podgorica Airport is only a few kilometers away.

== History ==
Construction of an aluminium smelter in Montenegro was first proposed in the 1960s, when significant quantities of high quality bauxite ore were discovered near Nikšić. With support from Pechiney construction of KAP began in 1969, while production of aluminium began in 1971.

=== Breakup of Yugoslavia (1990s) ===
The plant had its most difficult times during UN-imposed economic sanctions on FR Yugoslavia. During the sanctions, the production was reduced to 13% of capacity. In the period 1997–1999 KAP participated with 8.2–6.7% in GDP of Montenegro, and 65–67% in export for the same period. Most of the time, the KAP acquired necessary raw materials and spare parts from Glencore. The entire export was also conducted by Glencore. The company was one of the few Montenegrin companies to recover quickly after the breakup of Yugoslavia.

=== Russian ownership (2005–2013) ===
On 1 December 2005, KAP was privatized, with 65.4394% of shares being sold to Salomon Enterprises Limited (later renamed CEAC – Central European Aluminum Company), a company based in Cyprus, for €48.5 million and obligations to invest over €50 million in its modernization and environmental upgrade. CEAC is fully owned by En+ Group. The negotiations on the sale were conducted directly between Oleg Deripaska and the then Prime Minister of Montenegro, Milo Đukanović.

In May 2006 CEAC said that "various breaches of representations and warranties" of the deal were discovered by accountants Deloitte, including KAP having "hidden" debts and obligations towards the state totalling tens of millions of euros. In addition, the government-certified 2004 accounts were deemed inaccurate when it came to working capital and other assets. "It became evident to CEAC that KAP's initial financial situation had been misrepresented," the company claimed.

As of 2008, the KAP has struggled to survive the impact of ongoing economic crisis. The low trading price of aluminium, and expensive production inputs, primarily the electricity and alumina production, have resulted in KAP generating daily losses of up to €200,000. The company has been unable to survive ever since without the constant Government subsidies, primarily in writing off the debt for electricity.

In June 2009, the financial situation at the company had not improved, leaving KAP in danger of being closed by CEAC. The government, not wanting to see its largest company being shut down, agreed to guarantee a €45 million loan. In exchange, the government would receive half of the stakes owned by CEAC, leaving CEAC with a stake of 29.3%.

As relationship between the owners and management and the Government of Montenegro became increasingly sour, there was an ongoing debate within the country about the fate of the company. The size of the company, number of employees, and its impact on the Montenegrin trade balance imply that efforts will be made by the Government to keep the company alive, although sustainable ownership and management arrangements are yet to be made given the current dissatisfaction with Russian owners. On 8 July 2013, KAP officially went bankrupt, having up to that point accumulated a debt of 383 million euros, while the company itself is worth 180 million euros.

=== Montenegrin ownership (2014–present) ===
In July 2014, KAP was sold for 28 million euros to the Montenegrin company Uniprom that is 100% owned by Veselin Pejović.

As of 2025, KAP is largely demolished.

== Controversies ==
The Podgorica Aluminium Plant (KAP) has been a focal point of controversy and criticism, despite its status as the largest individual contributor to Montenegro's GDP and exports. The primary source of discontent revolves around environmental concerns, as the plant is heavily criticized for polluting the fertile Zeta Plain. KAP's red mud pond is notorious for emitting dry red dust that disperses through the villages in Zeta due to wind patterns.

KAP also faces scrutiny for consuming a significant portion of Montenegro's electrical power at reduced rates, while Montenegrin citizens experiencie frequent electricity shortages and pay substantially higher prices for it.

Political entities such as the Movement for Changes, argue that the sale of KAP was disadvantageous for Montenegro. They contend that the plant was undervalued and raise concerns about the business practices of CEAC owners, alleging consistent annual losses to avoid dividends payments to minority shareholders.

KAP's trade union has launched strikes frequently since privatization, demanding increases in wages.
