= Andrijevica Municipality =

Municipality of Montenegro

Andrijevica Municipality Opština Andrijevica Општина Андријевица
- Municipality
- Coat of arms

- Andrijevica Municipality in Montenegro
- Country: Montenegro
- Seat: Andrijevica
- Settlements: 24

Area
  - Municipality: 283 km^{2} (109 sq mi)
- Elevation: 740 m (2,430 ft)

Population (2023)
  - Municipality: 3,910
  - Density: 13.8/km^{2} (35.8/sq mi)
  - Urban: 1,048
  - Rural: 4,023
- Time zone: UTC+1 (CET)
  - Summer (DST): UTC+2 (CEST)
- Area code: +382 51
- ISO 3166 code: ME-01
- Vehicle registration: AN
- Website: opstinaandrijevica.me

The Andrijevica Municipality is located in northern Montenegro. Its center is the town of Andrijevica and its territory, which covers an area of 340 km^{2}, is surrounded by the Komovi, Bjelasica and Accursed Mountains ranges. In 2023, the Andrijevica Municipality had a population of 3,910.

== Geography and tourism ==
Andrijevica is surrounded by the mountains of Komovi, Bjelasica and Accursed Mountains, situated on a terrace 40 m above the river Lim. Tourist activities in the area includes mountaineering (alpinism, hiking), biking, rafting, team sports (soccer, basketball), fishing, etc. The main tourist attraction is mountain Komovi (2461 m). This mountain can be accessed by a car in less than 45 minutes, by the mountainous Andrijevica – Mateševo road. Andrijevica is connected with the rest of Montenegro by two-laned motorways. Local roads connect Andrijevica with Berane and Kolašin (both around 30 km (19 mi) away), where local roads merge with the E65/E80 road, which is the main road connection of Montenegro's coast and Podgorica with Northern Montenegro and Serbia. Andrijevica is on the corridor of the future Bar-Boljare motorway. Podgorica Airport is around 120 km (75 mi) away, and has regular flights to major European destinations.

== Municipal parliament (2024–2028) ==
The municipal parliament consists of 30 deputies elected directly for a four-year term.

Party / Coalition	Seats	Local government
DPS	11 / 30	Opposition
SNP	6 / 30	Government
PES	4 / 30	Government
ZBCG (NSD–DNP)	3 / 30	Government
ZBND	3 / 30	Opposition
DCG	2 / 30	Government
VPZU	1 / 30	Government

== Demographics ==
According to the 2023 census, the municipality of Andrijevica had a population of 3,910.

Historical population
Year	Pop.	±%
1948	10,067	—
1953	10,327	+2.6%
1961	9,792	−5.2%
1971	8,966	−8.4%
1981	7,712	−14.0%
1991	6,696	−13.2%
2003	5,785	−13.6%
2011	5,071	−12.3%
2023	3,910	−22.9%

Andrijevica (2003)
Serbs	69.61%
Montenegrins	25.13%
Others	5.25%

Andrijevica (2011)
Serbs	61.86%
Montenegrins	32.46%
Others	5.68%

Andrijevica (2023)
Serbs	67.52%
Montenegrins	28.62%
Others	3.86%

Andrijevica (2023)
Eastern Orthodox	97.75%
Roman Catholic	0.36%
Others	1.89%

== Gallery ==
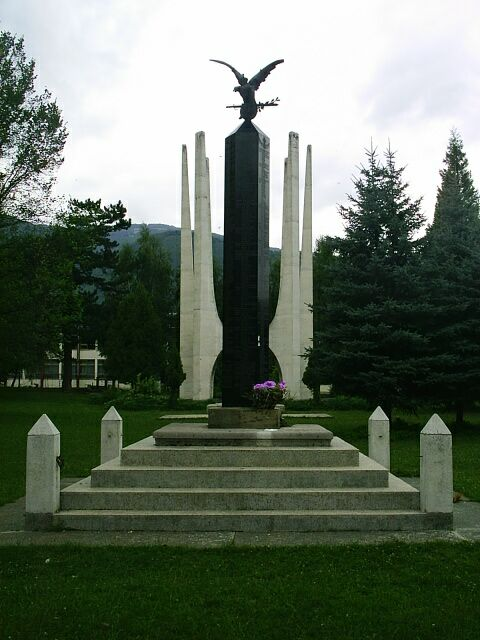
World War II memorial in Andrijevica

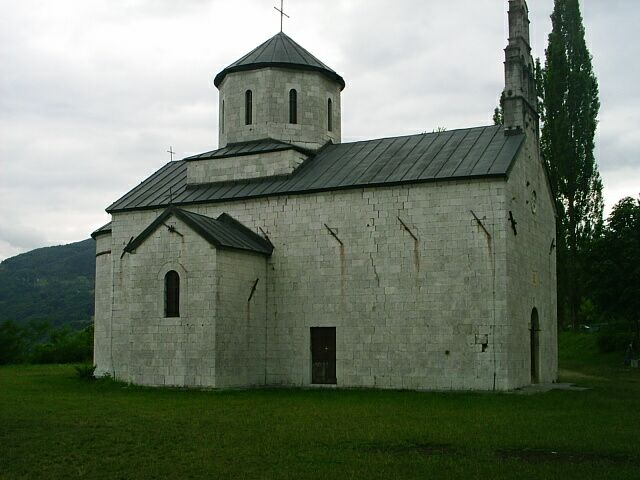
Vasojevići Eastern Orthodox Church

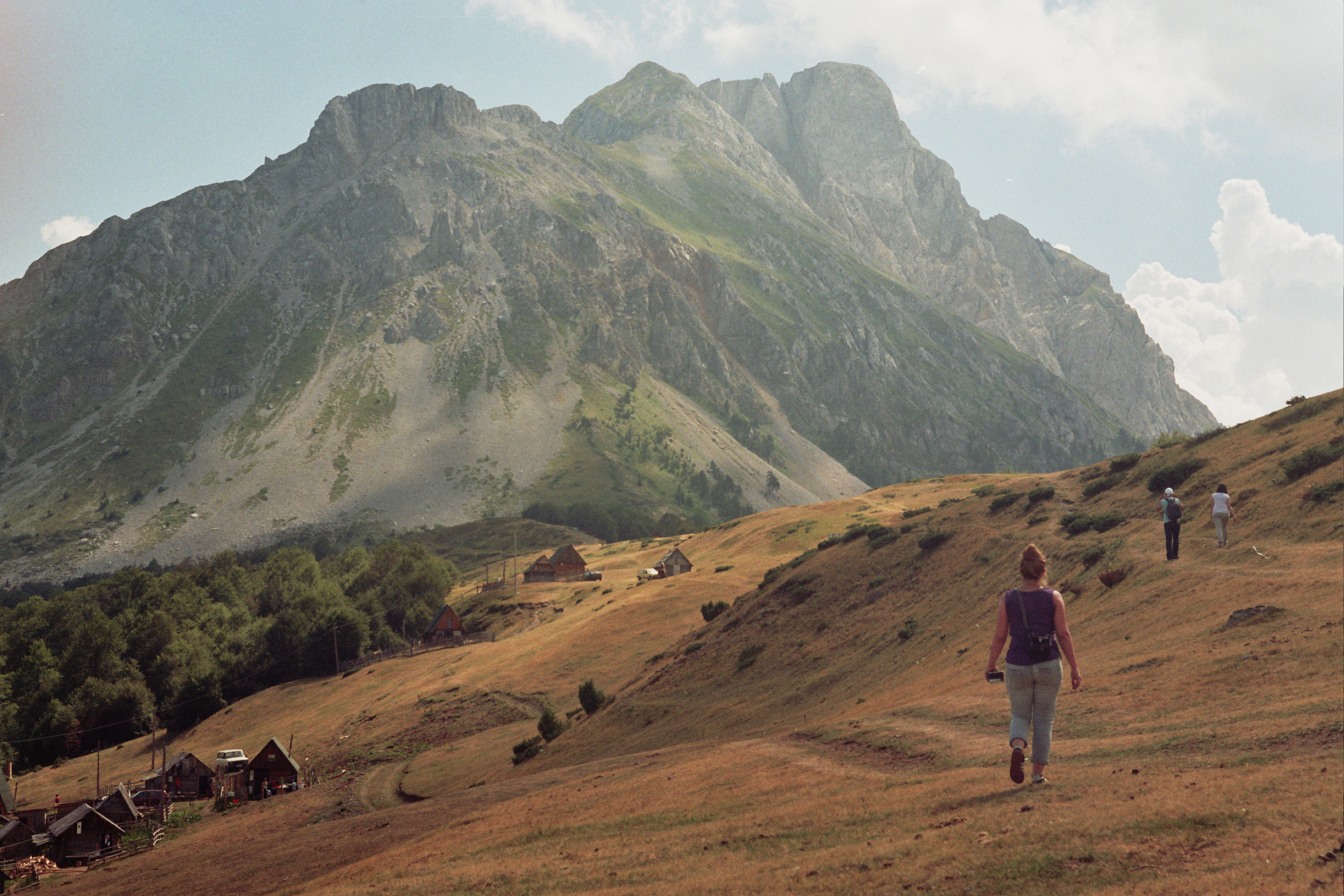
Komovi Mountain, Andrijevica Municipality

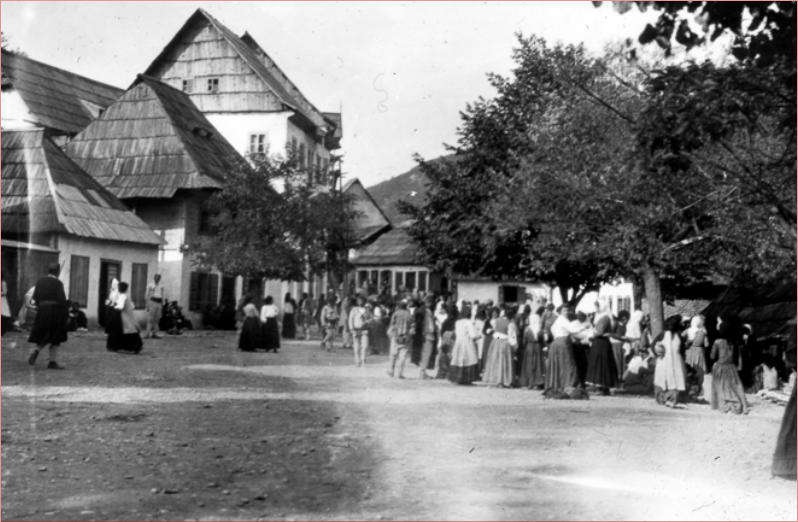
Market in the town of Andrijevica, 1903
