= Grnčar, Gusinje =

Grnčar Грнчар Gërçar
- Village
- Location within Montenegro
- Coordinates: 42.580147°N 19.802427°E
- Country: Montenegro
- Region: Northern
- Municipality: Gusinje

Population (2011)
  - Total: 180
- Time zone: UTC+1 (CET)
  - Summer (DST): UTC+2 (CEST)

Grnčar (Montenegrin Cyrillic: Грнчар; Albanian: Gerçar) is a village in the municipality of Gusinje, Montenegro. It is located close to the Albanian border.

== Demographics ==
According to the 2011 census, its population was 180. The population is majority Muslim. The Albanians of this village speak with the Gheg dialect of the Albanian language.

Ethnicity in 2011
Ethnicity	Number	Percentage
Bosniaks	75	41.7%
Serbs	63	35.0%
Albanians	18	10.0%
other or undeclared	24	13.3%
Total	180	100%
