= Zeta Plain =

Lowland plain in Montenegro

Coordinates: 42°20′N 19°16′E

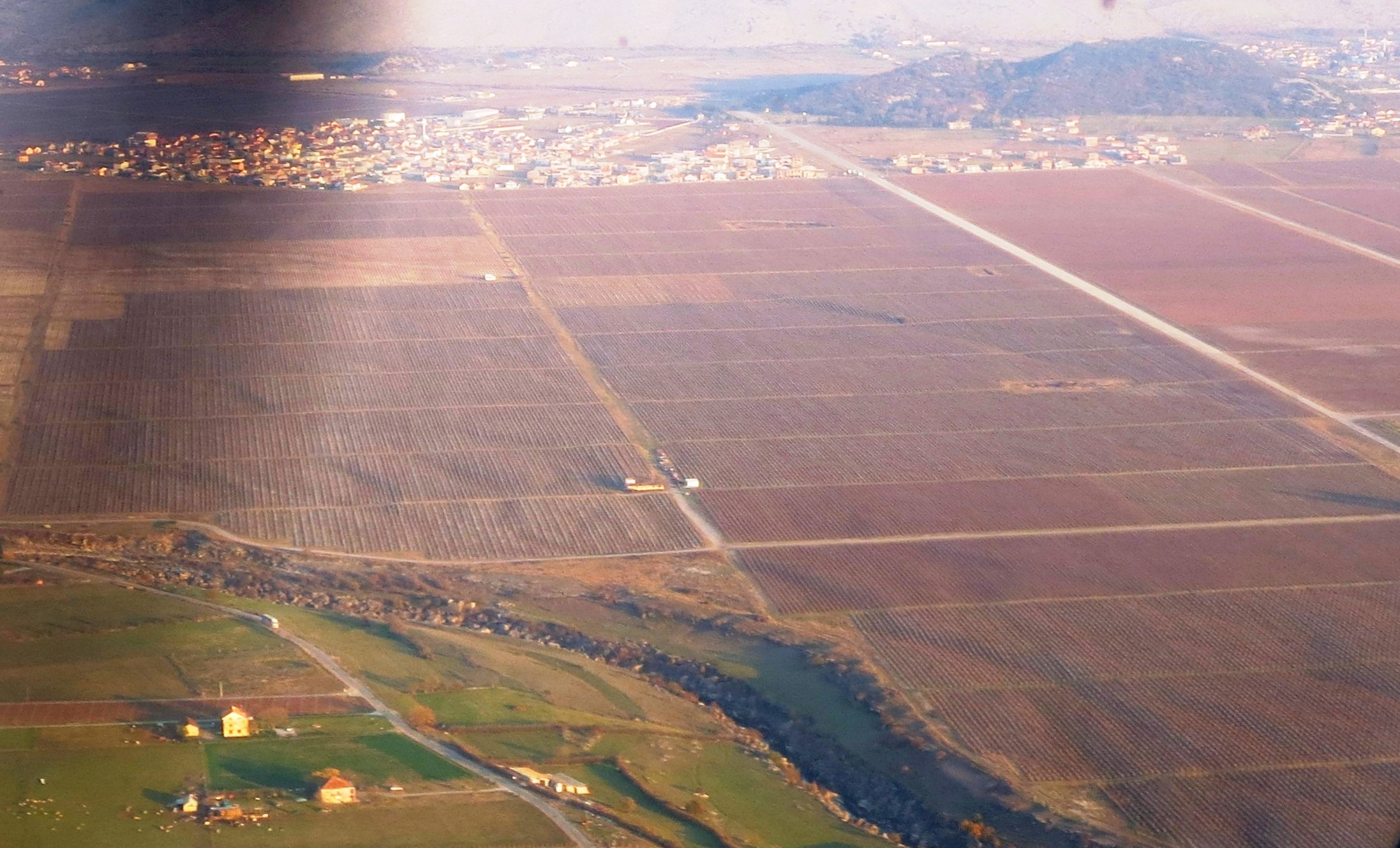
Vineyards on the Zeta Plain

The Zeta Plain (Montenegrin: Zetska ravnica / Зетска равница, pronounced [zɛ̂ta]) is a fertile lowland in Montenegro. It stretches from Podgorica in the north to the Skadar Lake in the south. It is the biggest plains area in Montenegro, with an average elevation around 40 m (130 ft) above sea level.

The name "Zeta" derives from an early root meaning "harvest" or "grain" (modern words žetva and žito). Confusingly, Zeta River flows not through the Zeta Plain but through another significant valley in Montenegro, Bjelopavlići.

Zeta Plain is one of the most densely populated areas in Montenegro. Golubovci, the capital of Zeta Municipality, which encompasses most of the plain, is the largest settlement. The vineyards of Plantaže, a Montenegrin quality wine producer, are situated in the plain, which is ideal for growing Mediterranean fruits and vegetables.

Zeta Plain is the site of the Podgorica Airport, as well as the Podgorica Aluminium Plant which is considered to be the worst pollutant of the plain.
