= Zeta Municipality =

Municipality of Montenegro

Zeta Municipality Opština Zeta Општина Зета
- Municipality
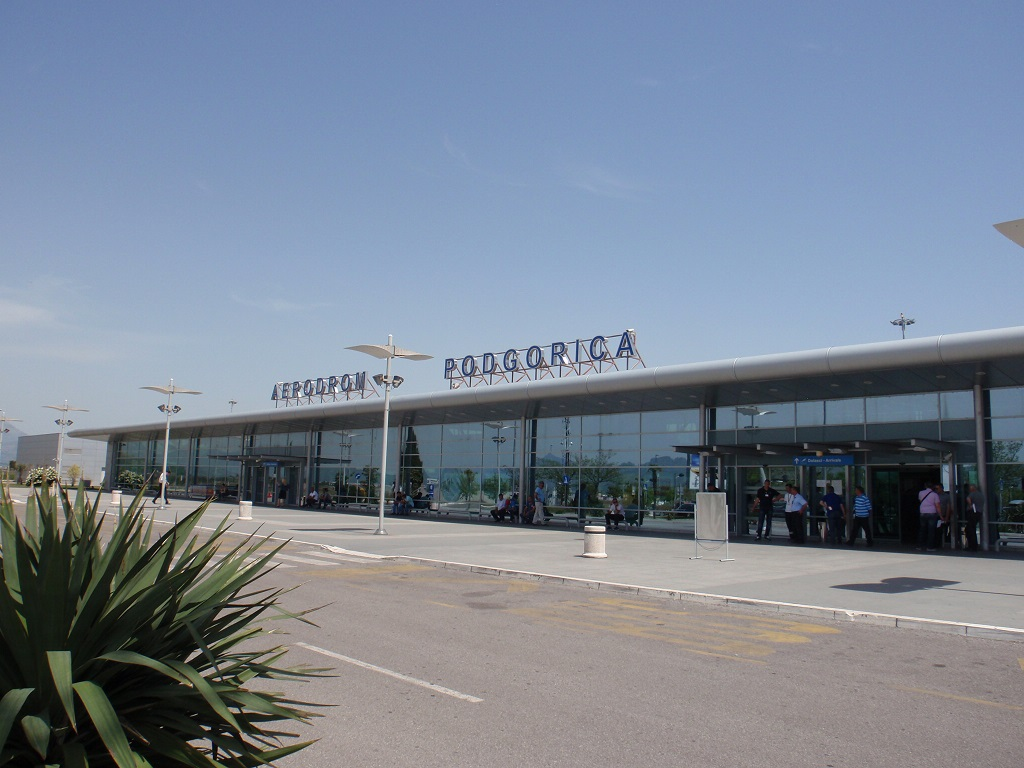
- Podgorica Airport in Golubovci

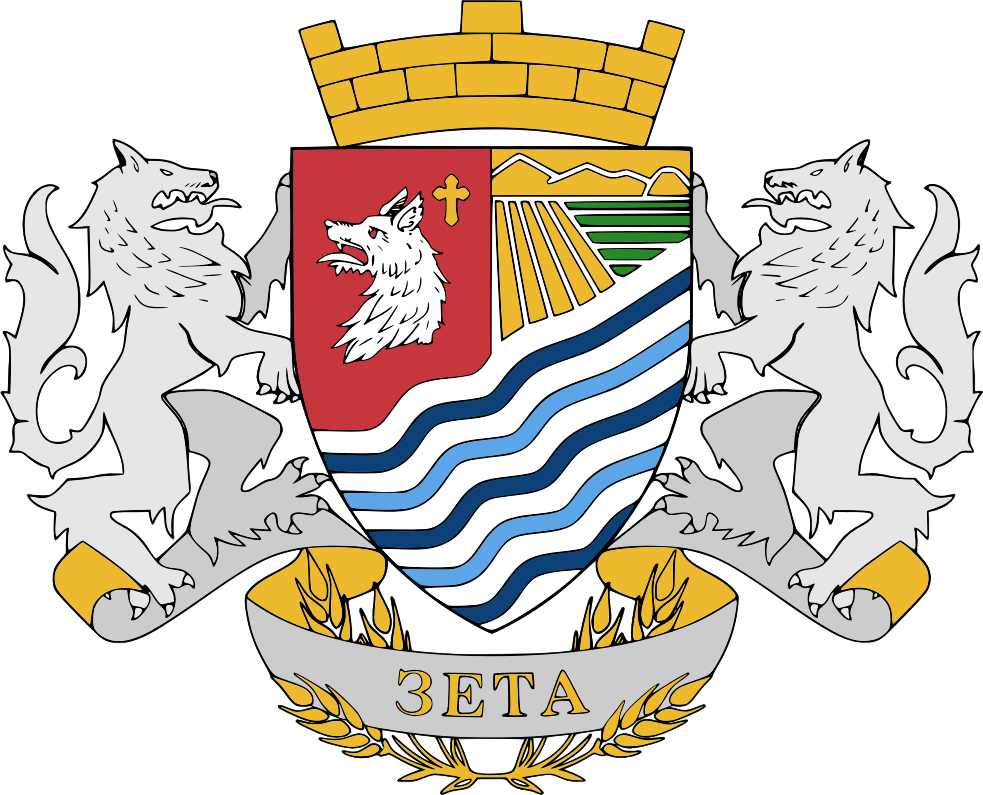
- Coat of arms

- Location within Montenegro
- Coordinates: 42.3344°N 19.2253°E
- Country: Montenegro
- Established: 1 September 2018
- Seat: Golubovci
- Number of settlements: 22

Government
  - Mayor: Mihailo Asanović (DNP)

Area
  - Total: 153 km^{2} (59 sq mi)

Population
  - Total: 16,206
  - Density: 106/km^{2} (274/sq mi)
- Time zone: UTC+01:00 (CET)
- Postal code: 81304
- Area code: +382 41
- ISO 3166 code: ME-25
- License plate: ZT
- Website: zeta.me

Zeta Municipality (Montenegrin: Opština Zeta / Општина Зета) is one of the municipalities of Montenegro. The seat of the municipality is the town of Golubovci. Created in 2022, it is the newest municipality in Montenegro.

== City Assembly (2022–2026) ==
Party/Coalition	Seats	Local government
ZBCG (NSD–DNP)	14 / 32	Government
DPS	8 / 32	Opposition
DCG	7 / 32	Government
PzP	2 / 32	Government
SNP	1 / 32	Government

== See also ==
- Montenegro
- Municipalities of Montenegro
- Golubovci
