= Veruša =

- Village
- Location within Bosnia and Herzegovina
- Coordinates: 43.9943703°N 18.0806418°E
- Country: Bosnia and Herzegovina
- Entity: Federation of Bosnia and Herzegovina
- Canton: Zenica-Doboj
- Municipality: Visoko

Area
  - Total: 1.30 sq mi (3.37 km^{2})

Population (2013)
  - Total: 71
  - Density: 55/sq mi (21/km^{2})
- Time zone: UTC+1 (CET)
  - Summer (DST): UTC+2 (CEST)

Veruša is a village in the municipality of Visoko, Bosnia and Herzegovina.

== Demographics ==
According to the 2013 census, its population was 71.

Ethnicity in 2013
Ethnicity	Number	Percentage
Bosniaks	66	97.4%
Croats	2	0.0%
other/undeclared	3	2.6%
Total	71	100%
