= Golubovci =

Golubovci Голубовци
- Town
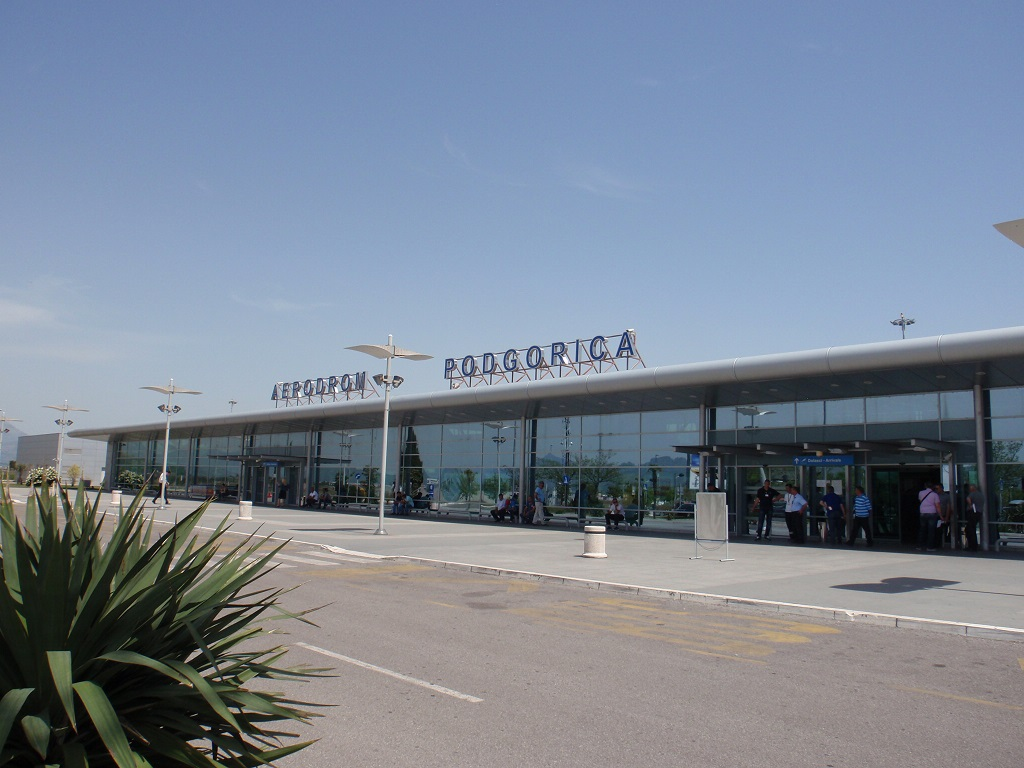
- Golubovci Airport, near town of Golubovci

- Location within Montenegro
- Coordinates: 42°20′4″N 19°13′31″E
- Country: Montenegro
- Municipality: Zeta

Government
  - Type: Mayor-Assembly
  - President: Mihailo Asanović (DNP)

Population (2011)
  - Urban: 3,110
  - Rural: 12,983
  - Urban municipality: 16,093
- Time zone: UTC+1 (CET)
  - Summer (DST): UTC+2 (CEST)
- Postal code: 81304
- Area code: +382 20
- Vehicle registration: ZT
- Climate: Cfa

Golubovci (Montenegrin: Голубовци, pronounced [ɡǒluboʋtsi]) is a small town in the new Zeta Municipality of Montenegro. Until 2022, it was part of Podgorica Municipality. Golubovci is the seat of the new municipality.

The town has 3,110 residents according to 2011 census, while the surrounding Zeta Municipality accounts for some 16,093 residents.

== Transport ==
Podgorica Airport is occasionally referred to as Golubovci Airport by locals, due to its proximity to the town.

Golubovci is located next to the M-2, Podgorica - Bar road (E65/E80), main Montenegrin road connection between the coast and northern part of the country. Part of this road went through the centre of Golubovci causing frequent traffic jams during the summer tourist season which led to construction of 4-lane dual carriageway, the Golubovci Bypass, in 2018.

== Sports ==
The town is home to FK Zeta, one of the most successful Montenegrin football clubs in recent years. They play their home games at the Stadion Trešnjica. The town's basketball team is KK Zeta 2011.

=== City Assembly (2022–2026) ===
Party/Coalition	Seats	Local government
ZBCG (DNP–NSD)	13 / 32	Government
DPS	8 / 32	Opposition
DCG	7 / 32	Government
PzP	2 / 32	Government
SNP	1 / 32	Government
PCG	1 / 32	Government

== Ethnic composition ==
=== Town (2011) ===
- Montenegrins - 1,920 (61.7%)
- Serbs - 844 (27,4%)
- No response - 265 (8.5%)
- Others 81 (2.6%)
- Total - 3,110

=== Municipality (2011) ===
- Montenegrins - 10,574 (65.15%)
- Serbs - 4,190 (25.81%)
- Others/unspecified - 1,467 (9.04%)
- Total - 16,093

== Municipality ==
Town of Golubovci is the seat of the recently created Zeta Municipality (Montenegrin: Opština Zeta / Општина Зета). The town is located some 15 km south of the city of Podgorica, in the fertile Zeta Plain (Zetska ravnica).

=== Gallery ===
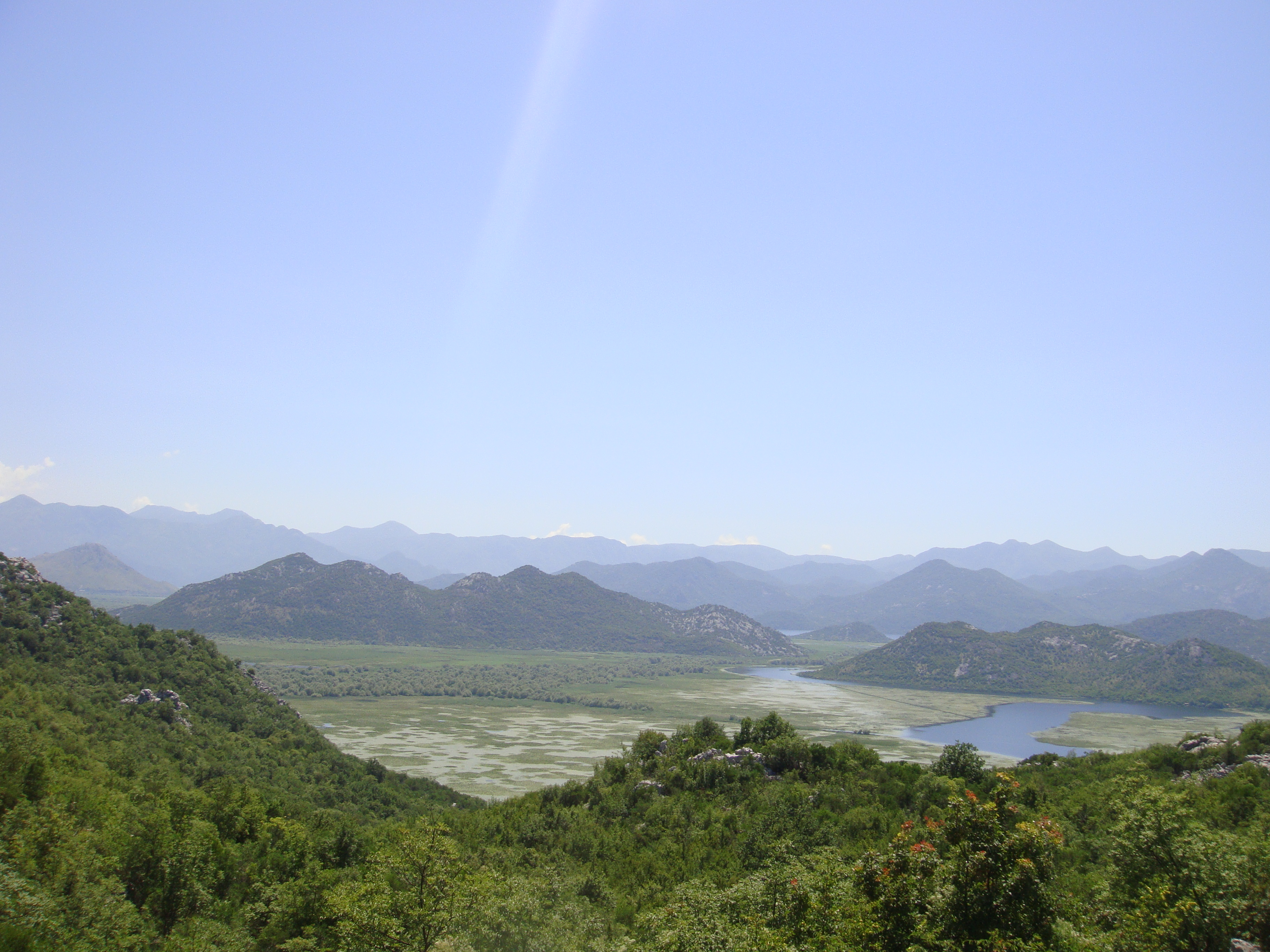
Skadar lake

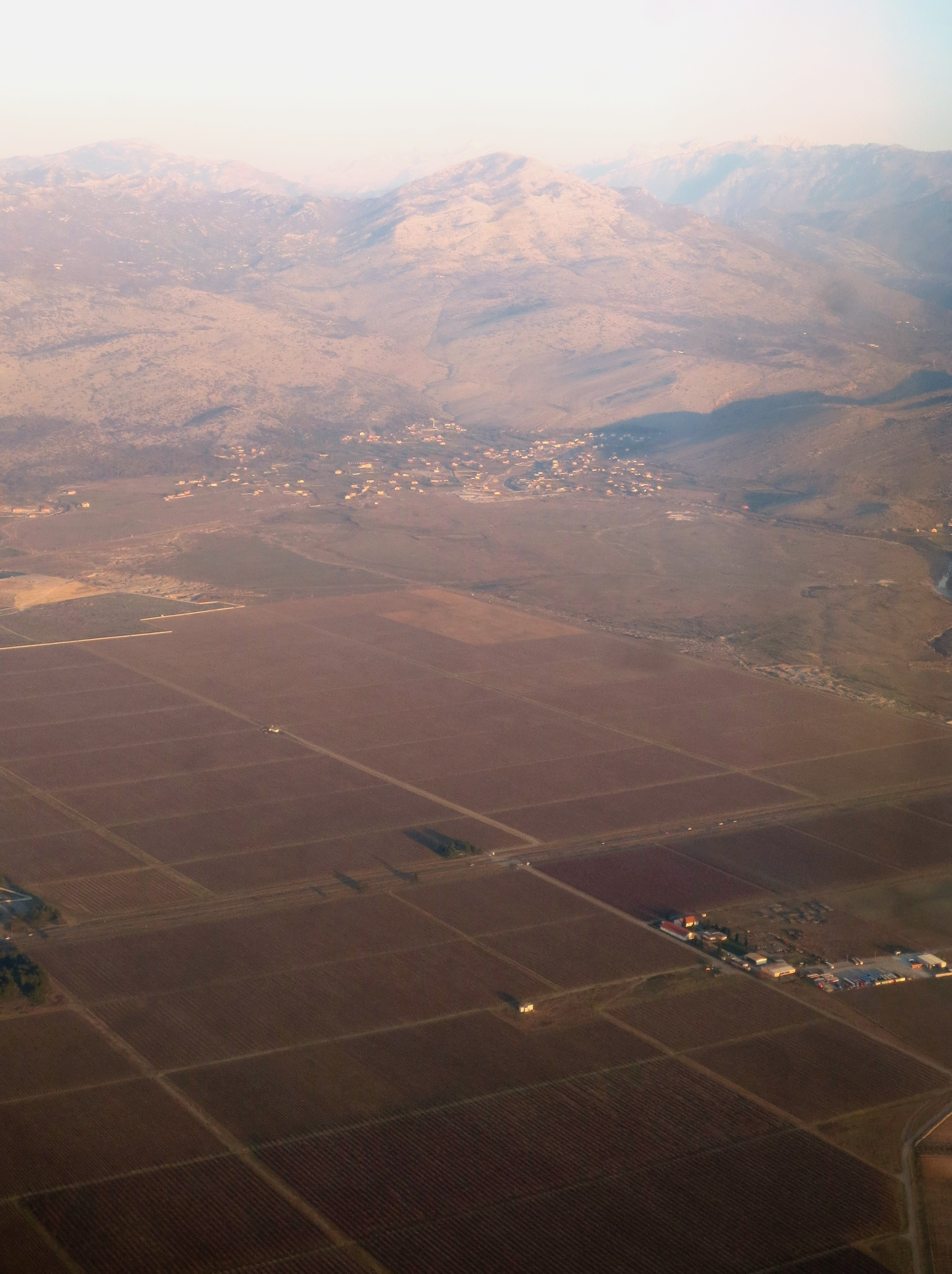
Zeta plain

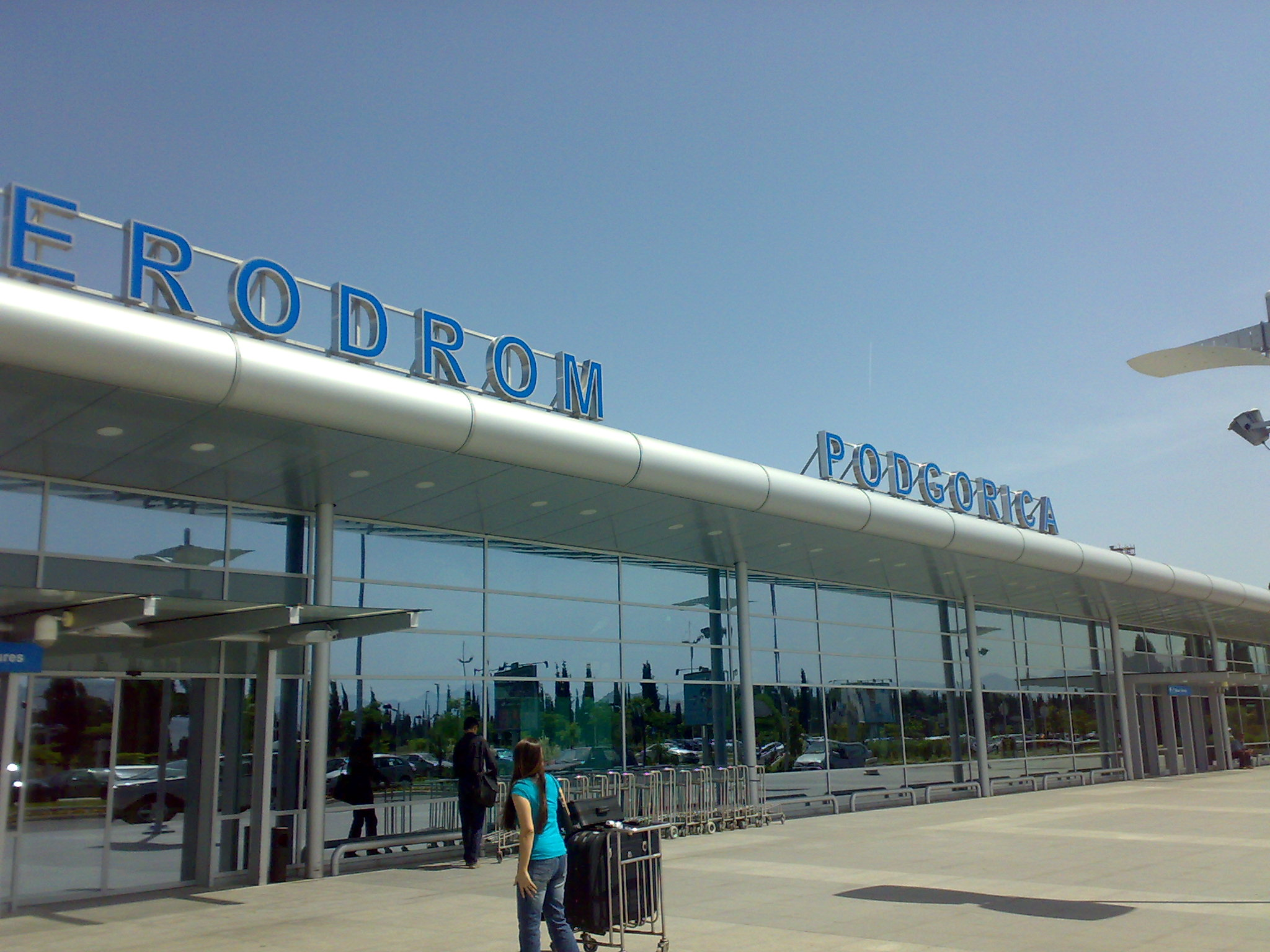
Golubovci Airport

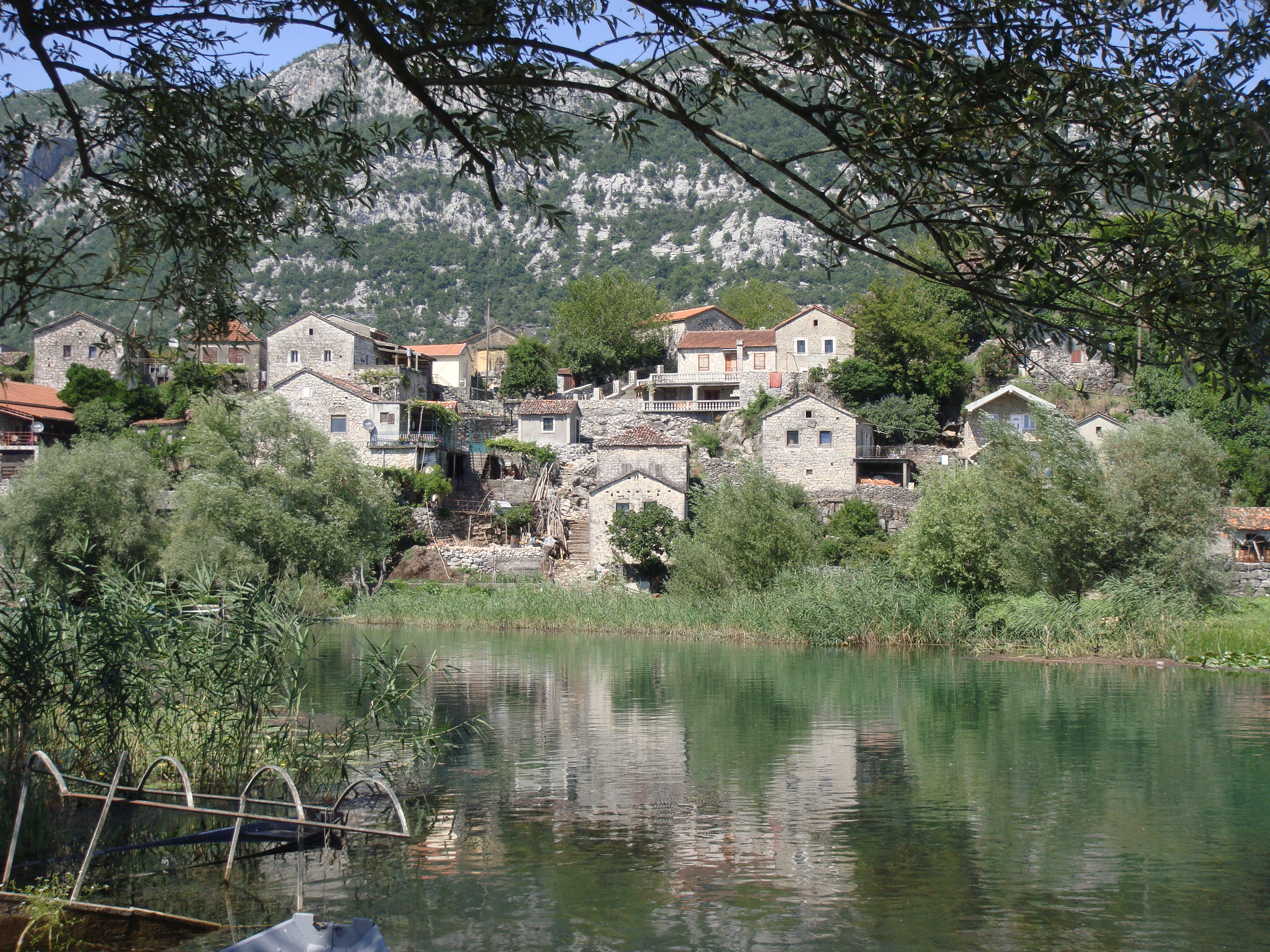
Dodoši, Skadar lake

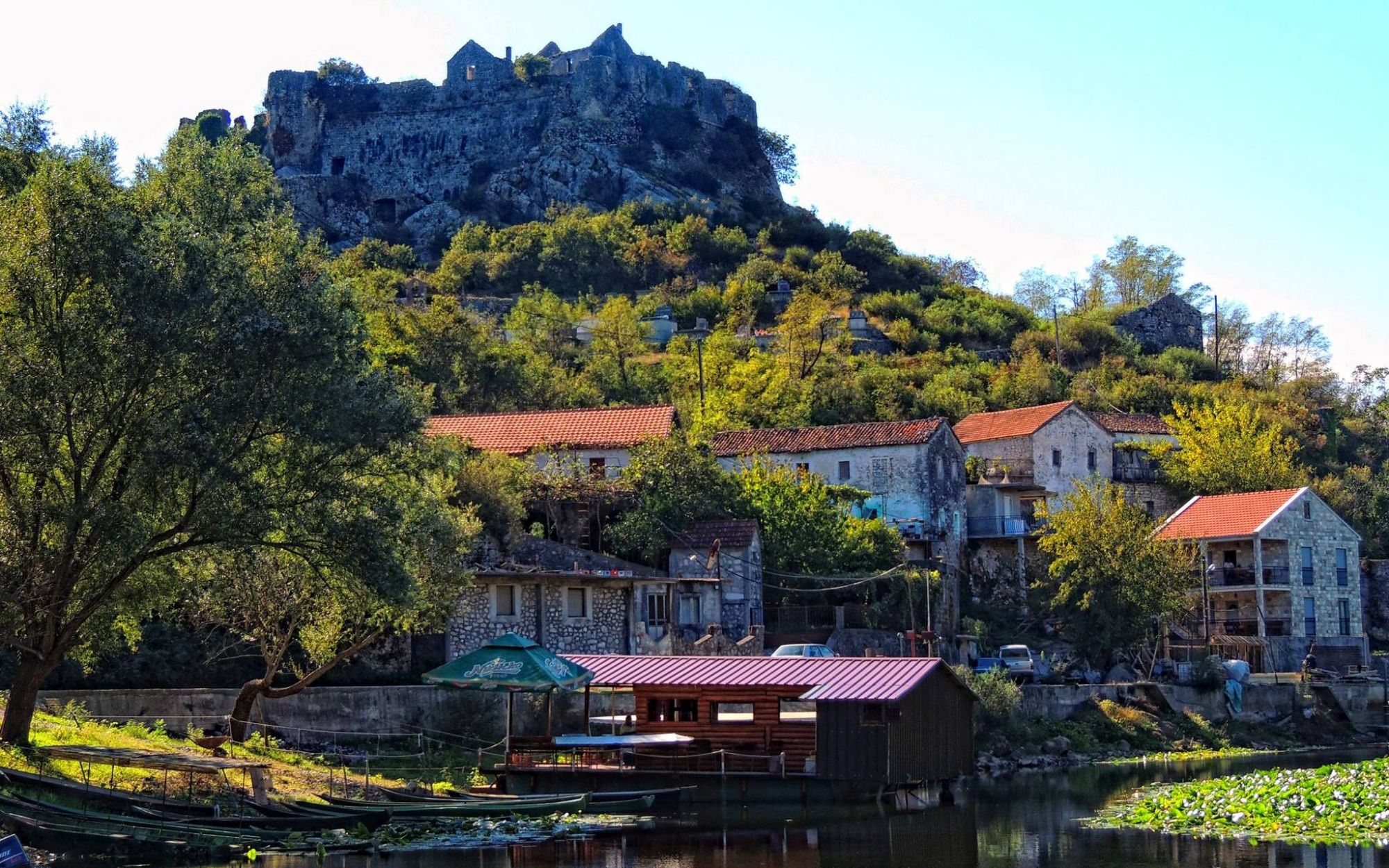
Žabljak Crnojevića castle

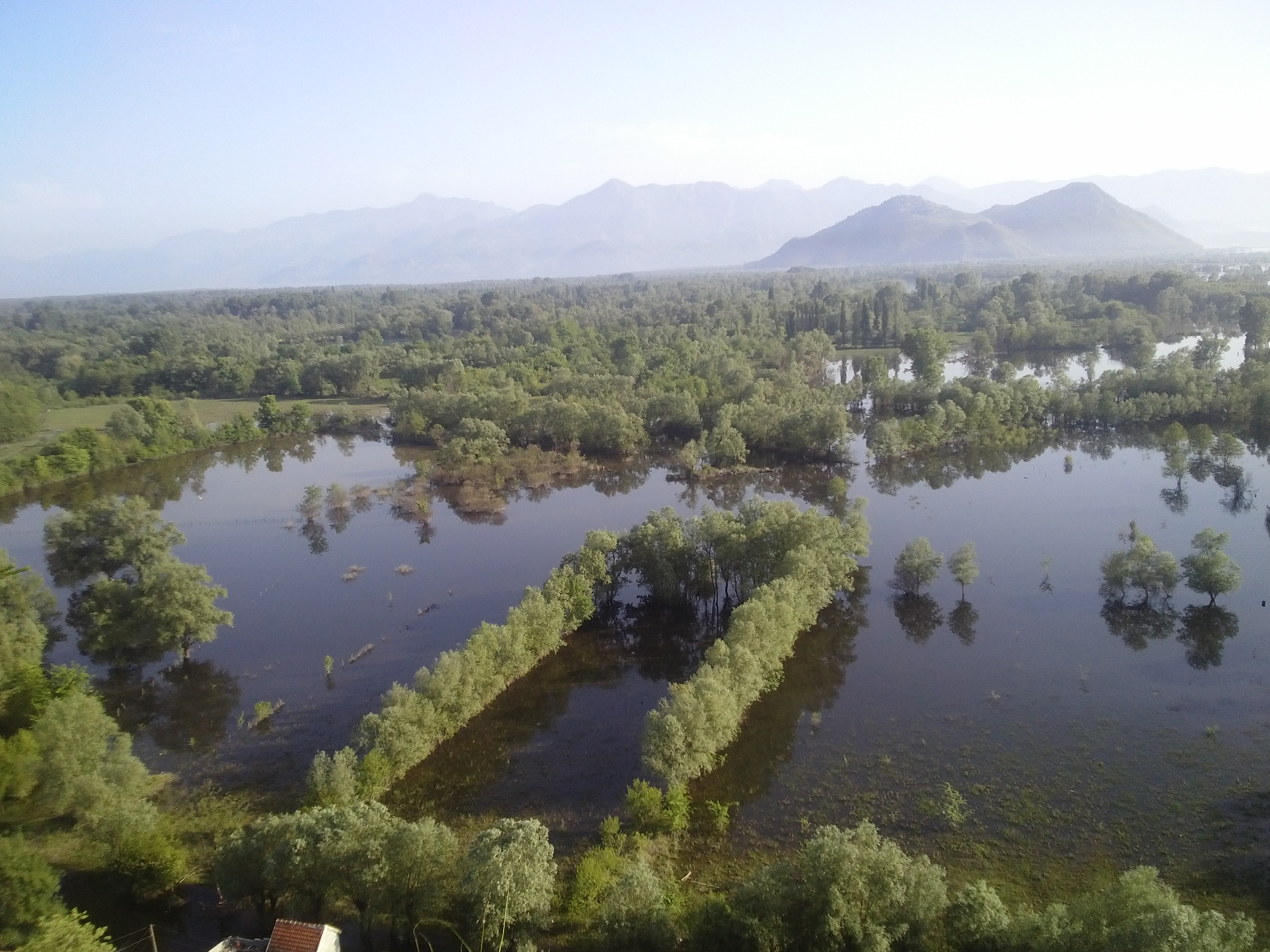
Vranjina island

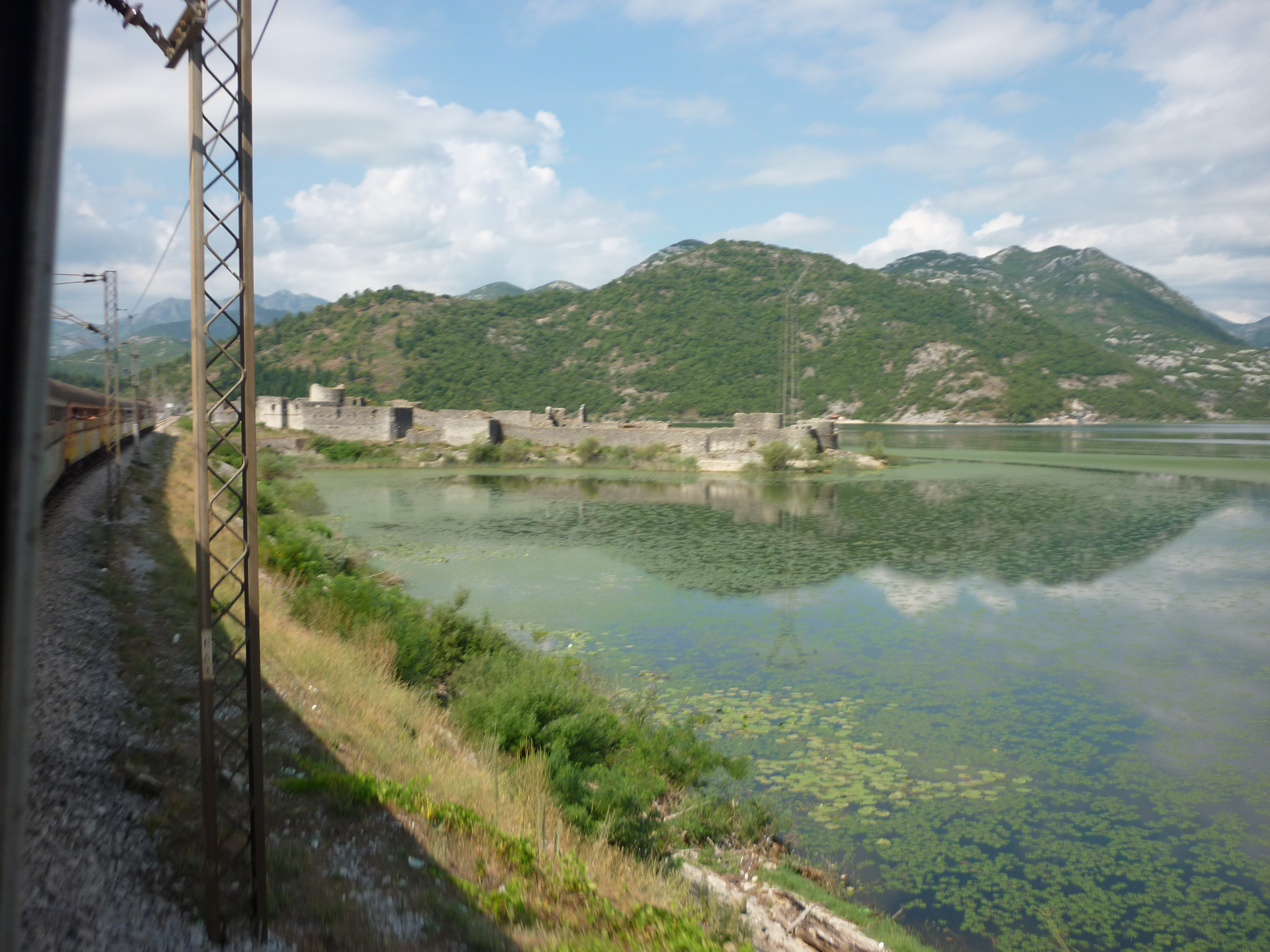
Lesendro fortress

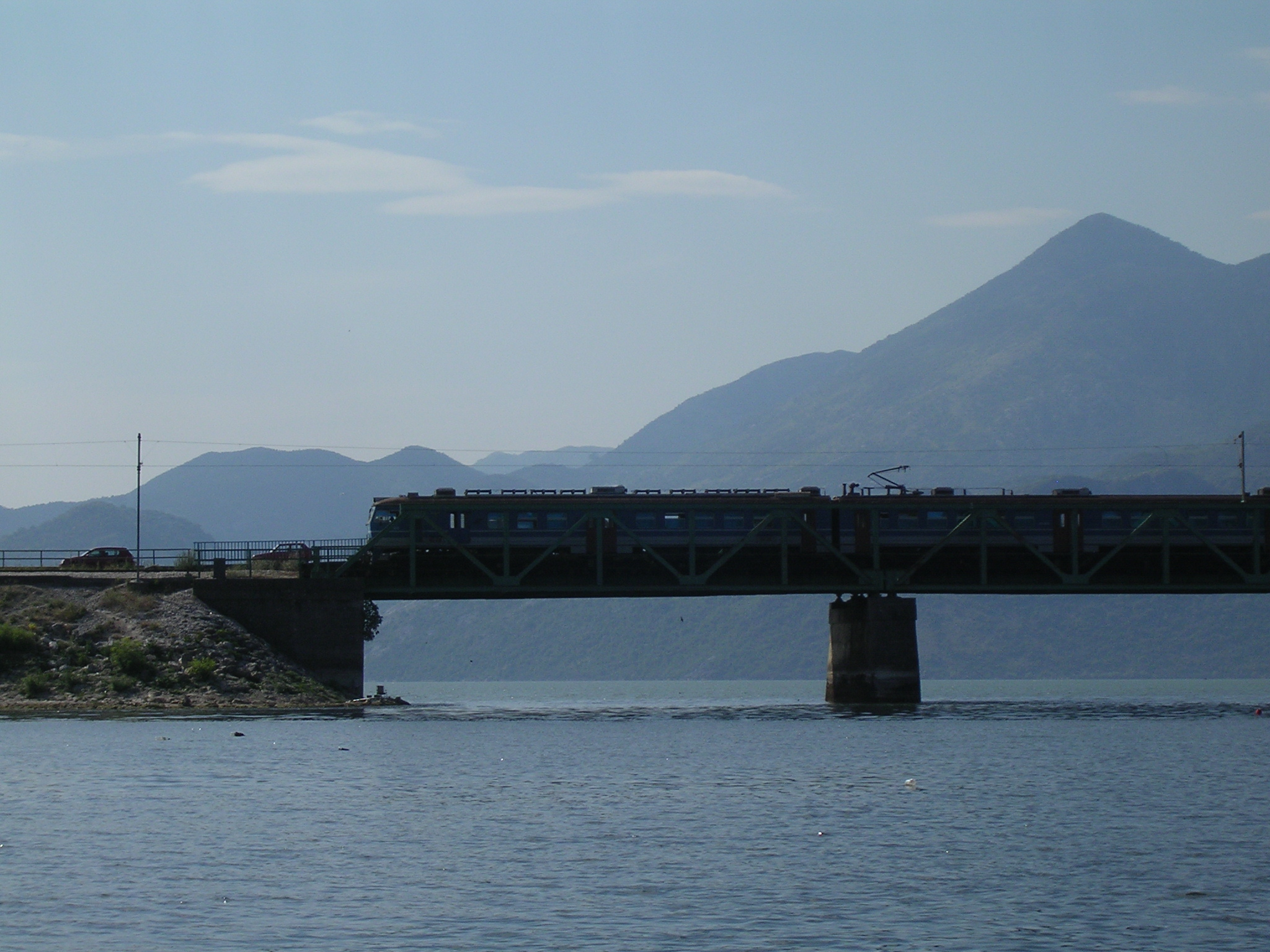
Belgrade - Bar railway
