= Crnča, Montenegro =

Crnča Црнча
- Village
- Location within Montenegro
- Country: Montenegro
- Municipality: Bijelo Polje

Population (2011)
  - Total: 466
- Time zone: UTC+1 (CET)
  - Summer (DST): UTC+2 (CEST)

Crnča (Montenegrin and Serbian Cyrillic: Црнча) is a village in the municipality of Bijelo Polje, Montenegro.

== Demographics ==
According to the 2003 census, the village had a population of 486.

According to the 2011 census, its population was 466.

Ethnicity in 2011
Ethnicity	Number	Percentage
Bosniaks	148	31.8%
Serbs	146	31.3%
Montenegrins	129	27.7%
other/undeclared	43	9.2%
Total	466	100%
