= Đurmani =

Đurmani Ђурмани
- Village
- Location within Montenegro
- Coordinates: 42.163098°N 19.020765°E
- Country: Montenegro
- Municipality: Bar

Population (2011)
  - Total: 243
- Time zone: UTC+1 (CET)
  - Summer (DST): UTC+2 (CEST)

Đurmani (Cyrillic: Ђурмани) is a village in the municipality of Bar, Montenegro.

== Demographics ==
According to the 2011 census, its population was 243.

Ethnicity in 2011
Ethnicity	Number	Percentage
Serbs	122	50.2%
Montenegrins	72	29.6%
other/undeclared	49	20.2%
Total	243	100%
