= Bistrica, Montenegro =

Bistrica Бистрица
- Village
- Location within Montenegro
- Coordinates: 42.991535°N 19.433810°E
- Country: Montenegro
- Region: Northern
- Municipality: Mojkovac

Population (2011)
  - Total: 102
- Time zone: UTC+1 (CET)
  - Summer (DST): UTC+2 (CEST)

Bistrica (Montenegrin Cyrillic: Бистрица) is a village in the municipality of Mojkovac, Montenegro.

== Demographics ==
According to the 2011 census, its population was 102.

Ethnicity in 2011
| Ethnicity | Number | Percentage |
|---|---|---|
| Montenegrins | 84 | 82.4% |
| Serbs | 18 | 17.6% |
| Total | 102 | 100% |
