= Mateševo =

Coordinates: 42°46′N 19°33′E

Mateševo Матешево
- Village
- Interactive map of Mateševo
- Country: Montenegro
- Region: Northern
- Municipality: Kolašin
- Time zone: UTC+1 (CET)
  - Summer (DST): UTC+2 (CEST)

Mateševo (Montenegrin Cyrillic: Матешево) is a village in northern Montenegro, within Kolašin Municipality. The 2003 census put the population at 97.

The first phase of Bar-Boljare motorway was extended from Podgorica to this village.
