= Bioče =

Bioče Биоче
- Village
- Location within Montenegro
- Coordinates: 42°31′N 19°21′E
- Country: Montenegro
- Municipality: Podgorica

Population (2011)
  - Total: 177
- Time zone: UTC+1 (CET)
  - Summer (DST): UTC+2 (CEST)

Bioče (Montenegrin Cyrillic: Биоче) is a village nine miles northeast of Podgorica, Montenegro. It is situated on the main road connecting Podgorica with northern Montenegro and with Serbia (E65/E80) routes and is a local station on Belgrade–Bar railway.

In 2006 it was the site of the Bioče derailment, where a train crashed, killing at least 39 and injuring more than 130 people, in the country's worst train disaster.

== Demographics ==
According to the 2003 census, it had a population of 179, the majority of which identified as Serbs, the rest as Montenegrins.

According to the 2011 census, its population was 177.

Ethnicity in 2011
Ethnicity	Number	Percentage
Serbs	132	74.6%
Montenegrins	34	19.2%
other/undeclared	11	6.2%
Total	177	100%
