= Kolašin Municipality =

Kolašin Municipality Opština Kolašin Општина Колашин
- Municipality
- Coat of arms

- Kolašin Municipality in Montenegro
- Country: Montenegro
- Seat: Kolašin

Area
  - Total: 897 km^{2} (346 sq mi)
- Time zone: UTC+1 (CET)
  - Summer (DST): UTC+2 (CEST)
- Postal code: 81210
- Area code: +382 20
- ISO 3166 code: ME-09
- Vehicle registration: KL
- Website: opstinakolasin.me

Kolašin Municipality is one of the municipalities of Montenegro. Located in Northern Montenegro, municipality is part and unofficial centre of Morača region, named after Morača river. The centre is the town of Kolašin.

== Location and tourism ==
Kolašin is one of the centres of Montenegro's mountain tourism. Although Žabljak is considered a more attractive destination, Kolašin has the advantage of being easily accessible by road and railroad. Kolašin is located on the foot of the Bjelasica and Sinjajevina mountains, which offer great conditions for skiing. Because of Kolašin's altitude (954 m), the town is considered an aerial spa. Biogradska Gora national park is in the town's vicinity, and is considered a premium tourist attraction. The development of Kolašin as a tourist destination is bolstered by the opening of the Bianca Resort & Spa, a luxury resort in the town's center. Kolašin is connected with the rest of Montenegro by two-lane motorways. It is situated on the main road connecting Montenegro's coast and Podgorica with northern Montenegro and Serbia (E65, E80). Kolašin is also a station on the Belgrade–Bar railway. Podgorica Airport is 80 km (50 mi) away, and has regular flights to major European destinations.

=== City Assembly (2022–2026) ===
The municipal parliament consists of 31 deputies elected directly for a four-year term.

Party / Coalition	Seats	Local government
DCG	7 / 31	Government
DPS	6 / 31	Opposition
ZBCG (NSD–DNP)	4 / 31	Government
PES	3 / 31	Government
SNP	3 / 31	Government
GBZNK	2 / 31	Opposition
UCG	2 / 31	Government
SDP	1 / 31	Opposition
URA	1 / 31	Government
SD	1 / 31	Opposition

== Population ==
The town of Kolašin is the administrative centre of the municipality, which in 2023 had a population of 6,700. The town of Kolašin itself has 2,437 residents.

Ethnic groups (1991 census):

- Montenegrins (93.16%)
- Serbs (4.34%)

Ethnic groups (2003 census):

- Montenegrins (50.65%)
- Serbs (44.77%)

Ethnic groups (2023 census):

- Montenegrins (52.07%)
- Serbs (42.10%)

Religion (2023 census):

- Eastern Orthodox (94.85%)
- Islam (0.57%)
- Roman Catholic (0.37%)
- Undeclared (2.01%)
- Atheist (1.60%)
- Others (0.60%)

Population of Kolašin:

- March 3, 1981 - 2,439
- March 3, 1991 - 2,807
- November 1, 2003 - 2,989

== Gallery ==
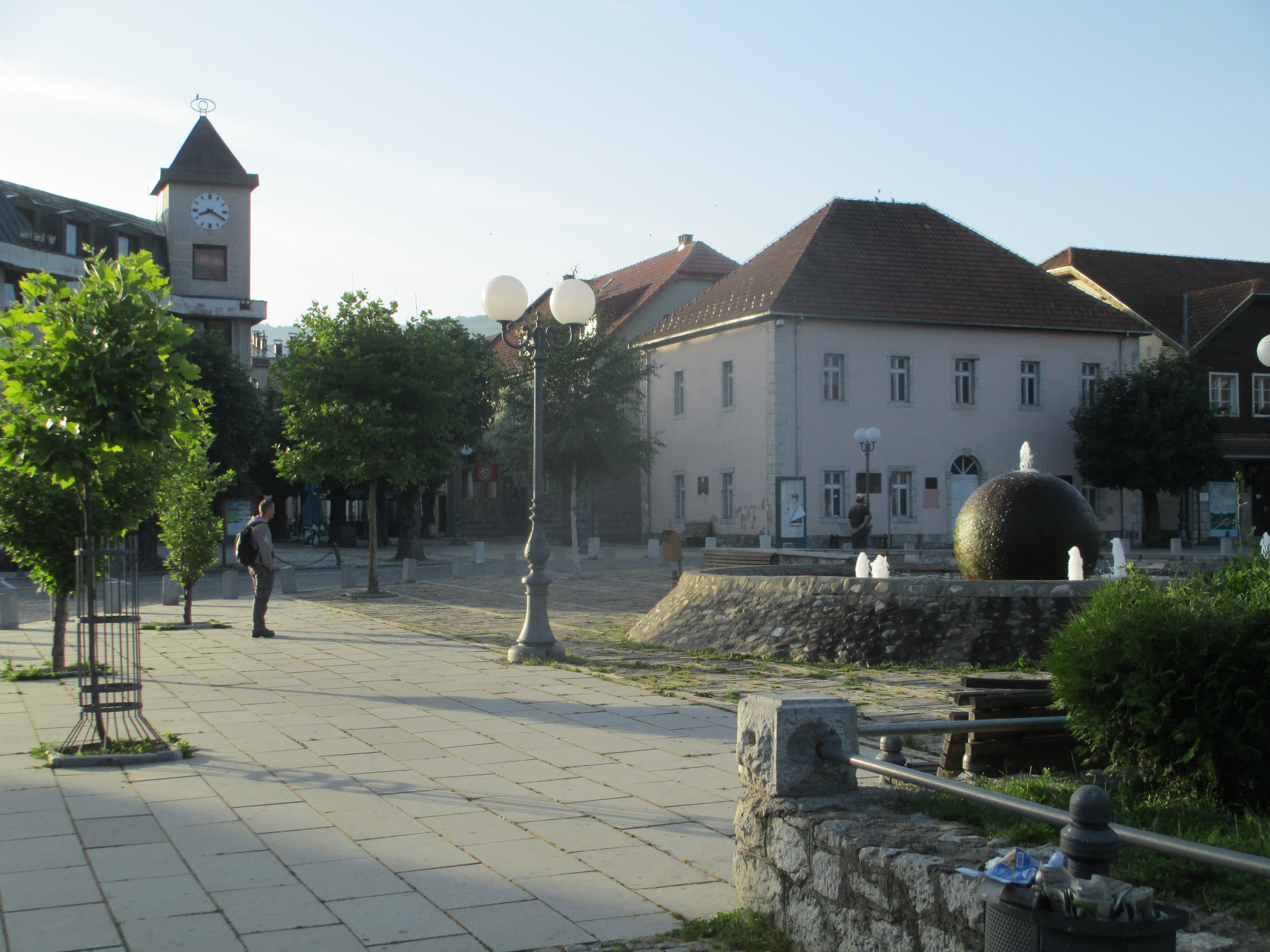
Town of Kolašin

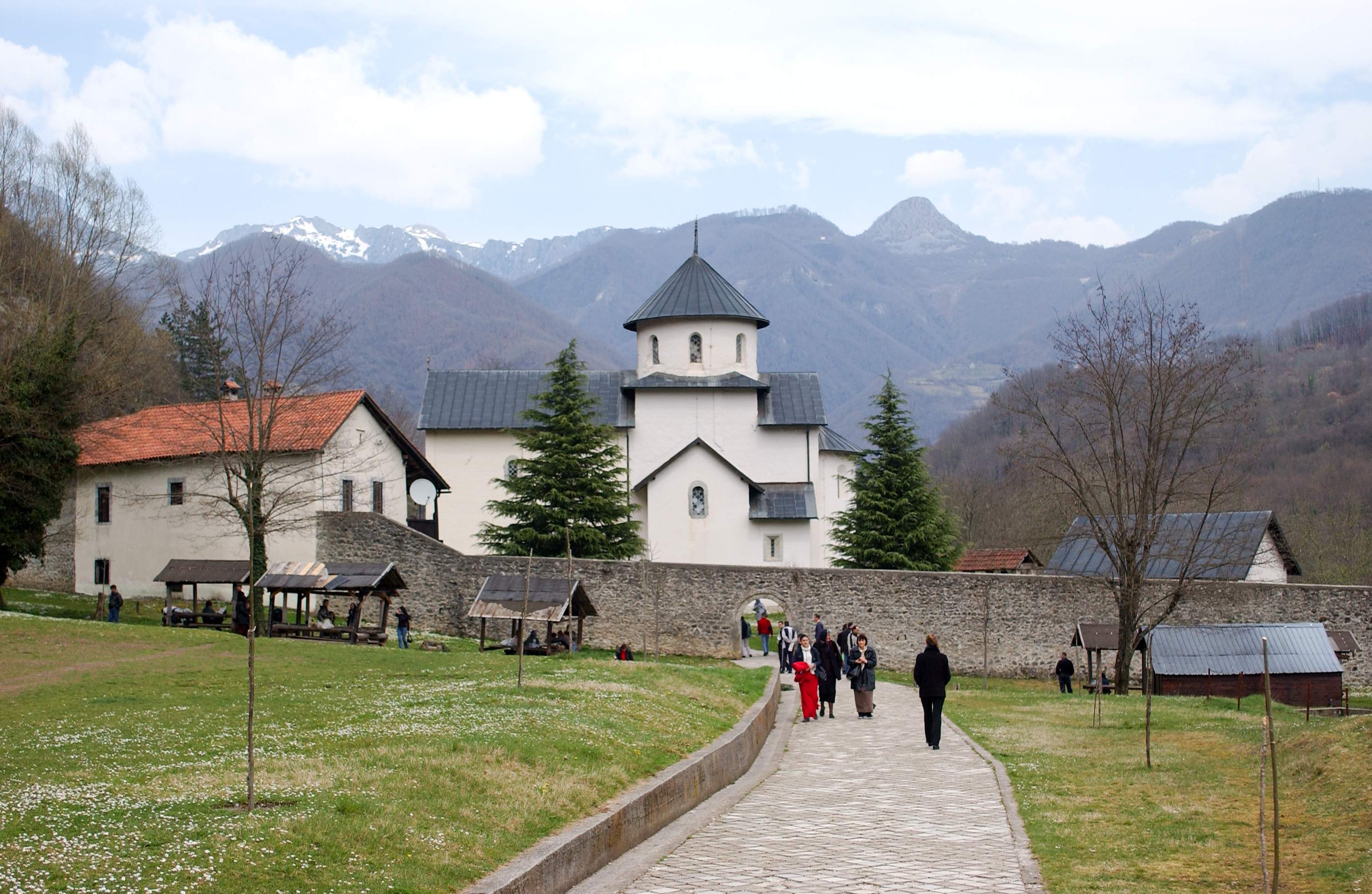
Morača monastery

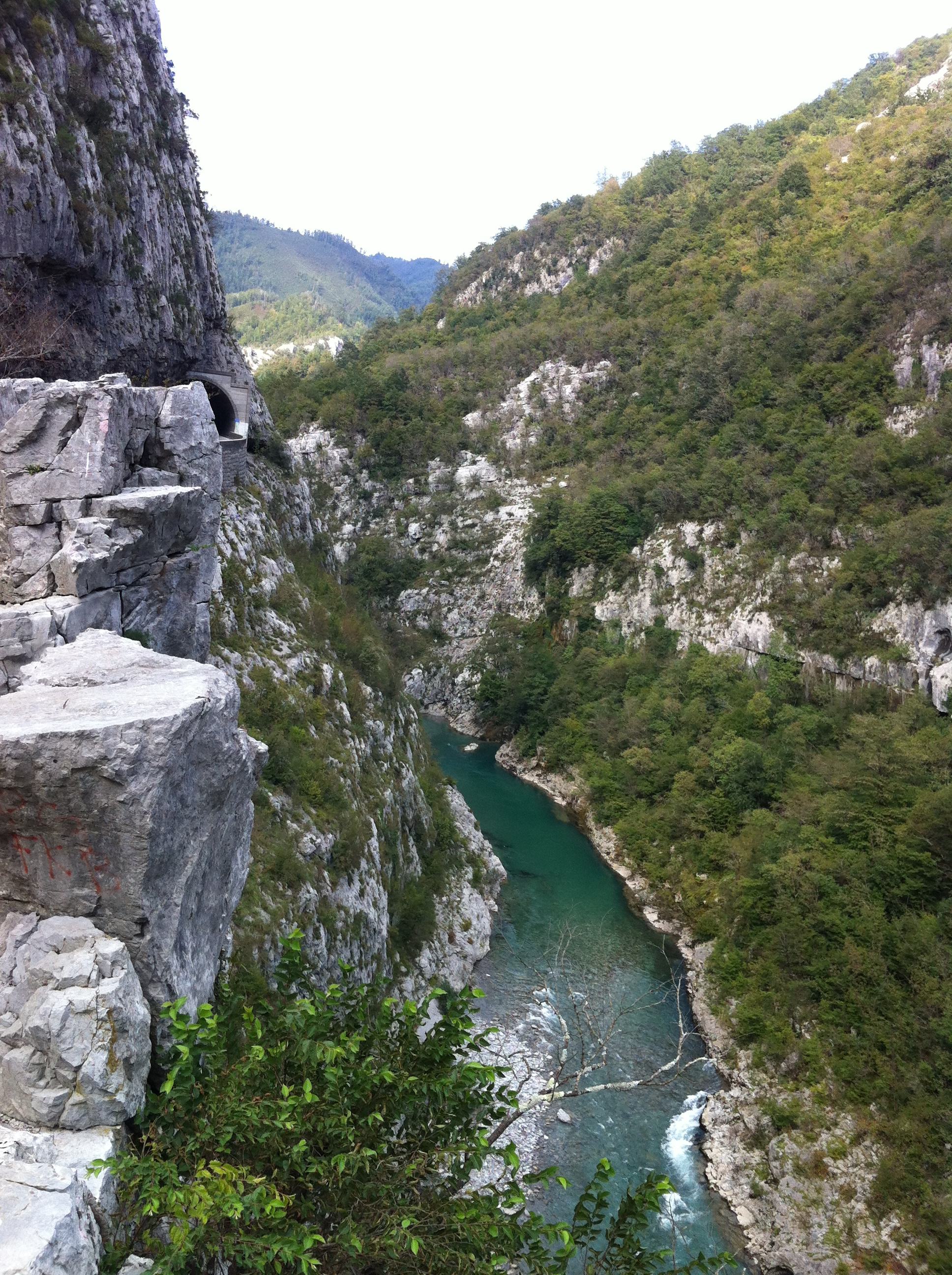
Morača river

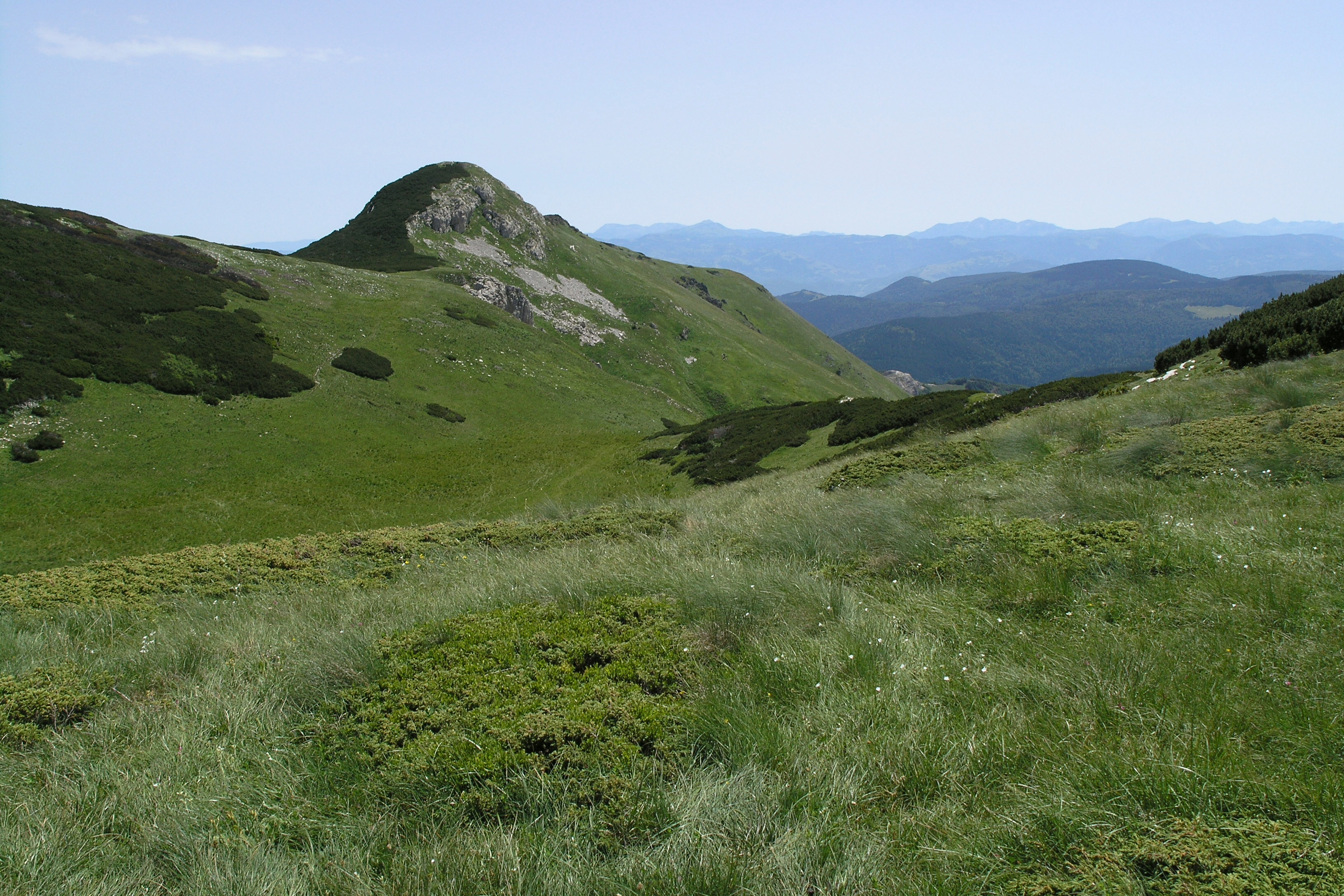
Bjelasica

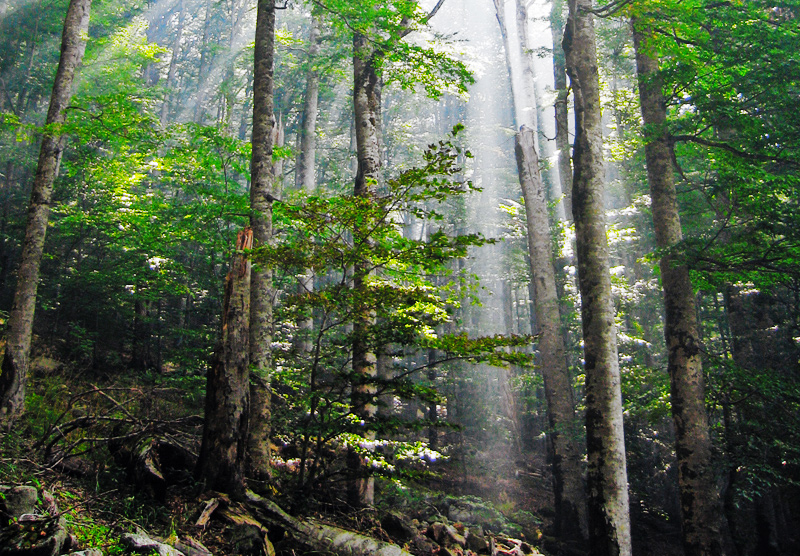
Biograd forest

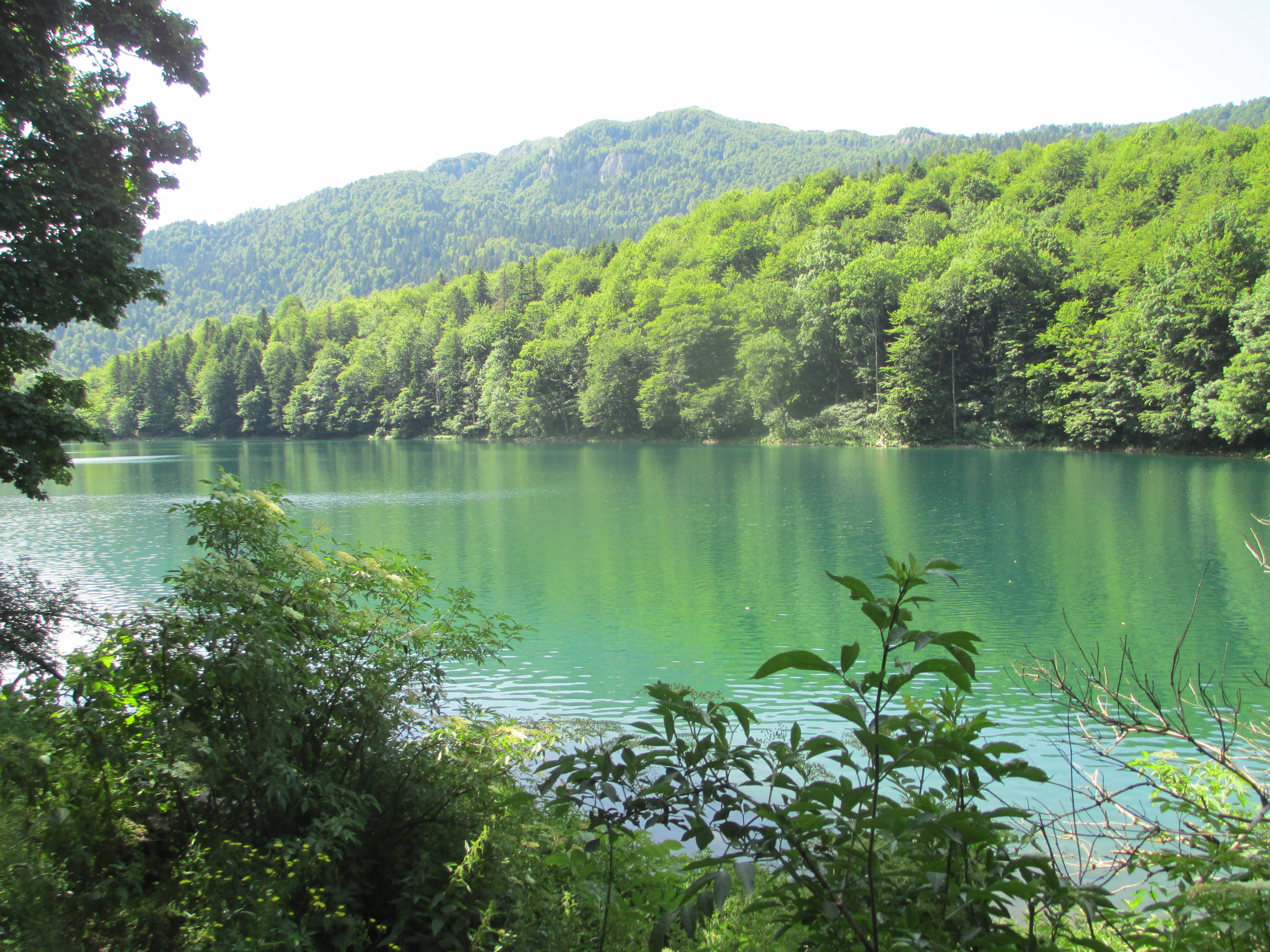
Lake Biograd

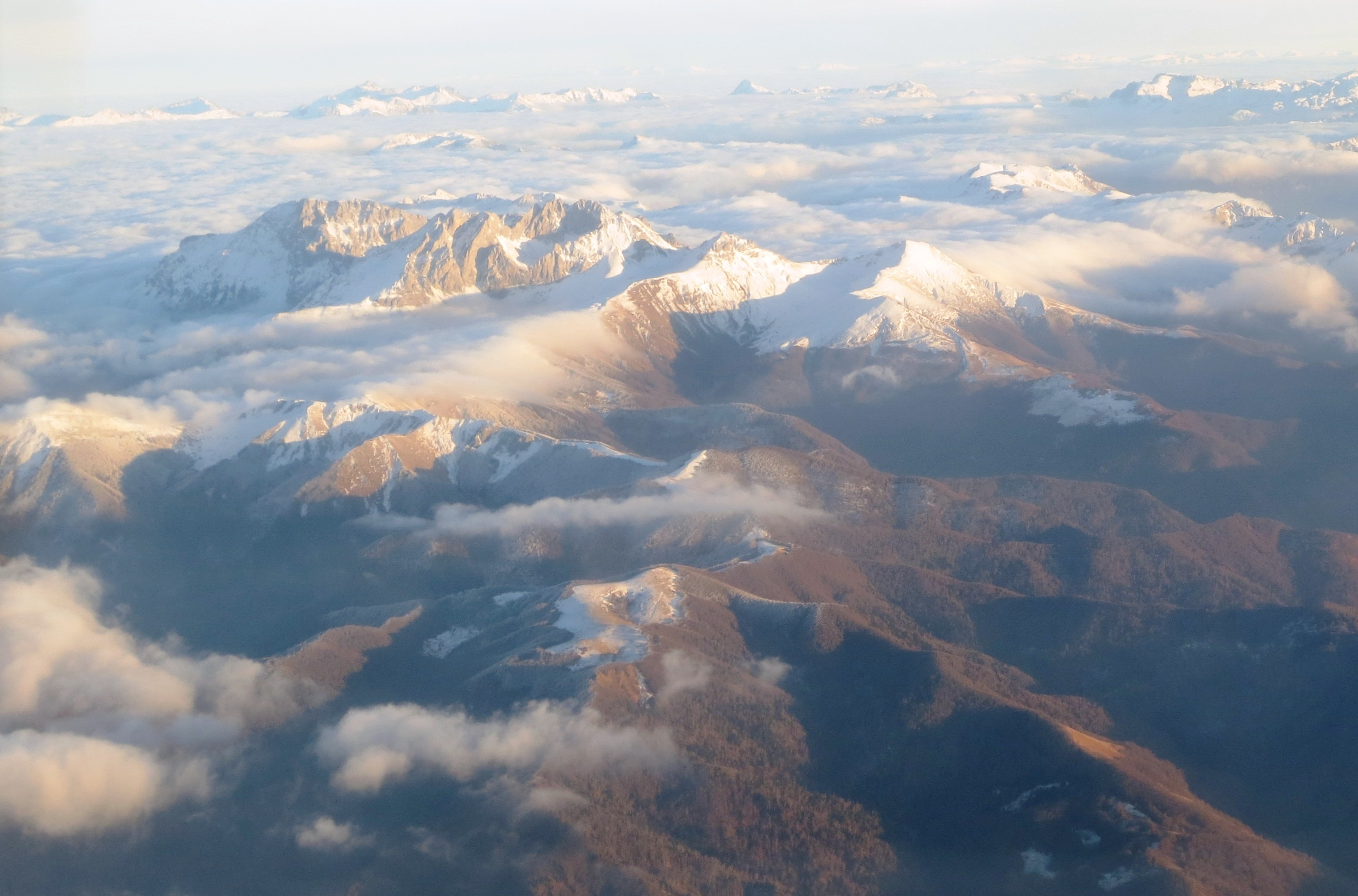
Komovi massif
