= Pljevlja District =

Coordinates: 43°16′N 19°16′E

Pljevlja District Pljevaljski srez Пљеваљски срез
- District of Montenegro
- Interactive map of Pljevlja District
- Country: Montenegro
- Administrative centre: Pljevlja

Government
  - Commissioner: n/a
- Municipalities: 4
- Cities and towns: 4

The Pljevlja District (Montenegrin: Пљеваљски срез, romanized: Pljevaljski srez) was a former district within Montenegro. The administrative centre of the Pljevlja District was Pljevlja.

== Municipalities ==
The district encompassed the municipalities of:

- Maoče
- Gradac
- Pljevlja
- Žabljak

== See also ==
- Districts of Montenegro
- Administrative divisions of Montenegro
