= Mijakovići =

Mijakovići may refer to:

- Mijakovići, Vareš, a settlement in Vareš, Bosnia and Herzegovina
- Mijakovići, Pljevlja, Montenegro
