= Moćevići =

Moćevići may refer to:

- Moćevići, Pljevlja
- Moćevići (Srebrenica)
