= Gornje Selo =

Gornje Selo, which translates as Upper Village from Serbo-Croatian, may refer to:

- Gornje Selo, Split-Dalmatia County, a village on the island of Šolta, Croatia
- Gornje Selo, Primorje-Gorski Kotar County, a village near Opatija, Croatia
- Gornje Selo, Montenegro, a village near Pljevlja
- Gornje Selo, Zavidovići, a village in Bosnia and Herzegovina
