= Orlja =

Orlja may refer to:

- Orlja, Pljevlja, Montenegro
- Orlja (Pirot), Serbia
- Orlja (Očevlja), mountain stream on Zvijezda, left tributary of the Krivaja in Bosnia and Herzegovina.
