= Mrčevo =

Mrčevo may refer to:

- Mrčevo, Croatia, a village near Dubrovnik
- Mrčevo, Montenegro, a village near Pljevlja
