= Vijenac (disambiguation) =

Vijenac is a Croatian literary magazine.

Vijenac can also refer to:

- Vijenac, Montenegro, a village near Pljevlja
- Vijenac (Lukavac), a village in Bosnia and Herzegovina
- Vijenac Lake, a lake in Bosnia and Herzegovina
- Vijenac (mountain), a mountain in Bosnia and Herzegovina

== See also ==
- Gorski Vijenac
