= Dubac =

Dubac may refer to:

- Dubac, Montenegro
- Dubac, a settlement in the Župa dubrovačka valley in Croatia
