= Ljutići =

Ljutići may refer to:

- Ljutići, Montenegro, a village near Pljevlja
- Ljutići, Croatia, a village near Malinska-Dubašnica, Croatia

== See also ==
- Lutici, a federation of West Slavic Polabian tribes
