= Planjsko =

Planjsko may refer to:

- Planjsko, Montenegro
- Planjsko, Majšperk, Slovenia
