= Kukavica (disambiguation) =

Kukavica may refer to:

- Kukavica, a mountain in Serbia
- Kukavica, Pljevlja, a village in Montenegro
- Kukavica (Vladičin Han), a village in Serbia
- Kukavica (Vlasotince), a village in Serbia
