= Vidre =

Vidre may refer to:

- Joaquín Rodrigo Vidre (1901–1999), Spanish composer and pianist
- Vidre, Pljevlja, Montenegro
