= Dedeić =

Dedeić (Serbian Cyrillic: Дедеић) is a Serbo-Croatian surname traditionally found in northern Montenegro. The Dedeić in Njegovuđa, Ramovo Ždrijelo, Žabljak and Maoče share ancestry from a Dobroje that moved from Čevo to Drobnjaci in the mid-17th century. During World War II in Yugoslavia, several people from Žabljak with the surname were members of the Yugoslav Partisans, including fighters Rajko, Uroš, Milovan, Boško, Božo, and Aleksandar "Lekso". It may refer to:

- Miraš Dedeić (born 1938), head of the uncanonical Montenegrin Orthodox Church
- Dobrilo Dedeić, Montenegrin politician, leader of the Serb List
- Đorđe Dedeić (fl. 1784), Serbian Orthodox monk, charity collector for the burnt down Nikolje Monastery in Ovčar-Kablar.
