= Košare =

Košare can refer to the following places:

- Košare, Montenegro, a village in the municipality of Pljevlja
- Košare, Bosnia and Herzegovina, a village in the municipality of Ilijaš
- Košare, Gjakova, a village in the municipality of Gjakova/Đakovica, Kosovo
  - Battle of Košare, fought in Košare, Gjakova in 1999
- Košare, Ferizaj, a village in the municipality of Ferizaj/Uroševac, Kosovo
