= Kržava =

Kržava may refer to:

- Kržava, Montenegro
- Kržava, Krupanj, Serbia
