= Dužice =

Dužice may refer to:

- Dužice, Široki Brijeg, Bosnia and Herzegovina
- Dužice, Montenegro
