= Potkrajci =

Potkrajci may refer to:

- Potkrajci, Bijelo Polje, Montenegro
- Potkrajci, Pljevlja, Montenegro
