= Milakovići =

Milakovići may refer to:

- Milakovići, Montenegro
- Milakovići (Prijepolje), Serbia
