= Bjeloševina =

Bjeloševina may refer to:

- Bjeloševina, Nikšić, Montenegro
- Bjeloševina, Pljevlja, Montenegro
