= Nange =

Nange Нанге
- Village
- Location within Montenegro
- Country: Montenegro
- Region: Northern
- Municipality: Pljevlja

Population (2011)
  - Total: 52
- Time zone: UTC+1 (CET)
  - Summer (DST): UTC+2 (CEST)

Nange (Montenegrin Cyrillic: Нанге) is a village in the municipality of Pljevlja, Montenegro.

== Demographics ==
According to the 2003 census, the village had a population of 69 people.

According to the 2011 census, its population was 52.

Ethnicity in 2011
Ethnicity	Number	Percentage
Serbs	32	61.5%
Montenegrins	19	36.5%
other/undeclared	1	1.9%
Total	52	100%
