= Alići =

Alići Aliži
- Village
- Location within Montenegro
- Coordinates: 43.2543°N 19.3562°E
- Country: Montenegro
- Region: Northern
- Municipality: Pljevlja

Population (2011)
  - Total: 107
- Time zone: UTC+1 (CET)
  - Summer (DST): UTC+2 (CEST)

Alići (Montenegrin Cyrillic: Алићи) is a village in the municipality of Pljevlja, Montenegro.

== Demographics ==
According to the 2003 census, the village had a population of 112 people.

According to the 2011 census, its population was 107.

Ethnicity in 2011
Ethnicity	Number	Percentage
Serbs	42	39.3%
Bosniaks	24	22.4%
Montenegrins	7	6.5%
other/undeclared	34	31.3%
Total	107	100%
