= Pauče =

- Village
- Location within Montenegro
- Country: Montenegro
- Municipality: Pljevlja

Population (2011)
  - Total: 32
- Time zone: UTC+1 (CET)
  - Summer (DST): UTC+2 (CEST)

Pauče (Serbian Cyrillic: Пауче) is a small village in the municipality of Pljevlja, Montenegro.

== Demographics ==
According to the 2003 census, the village had a population of 56 people.

According to the 2011 census, its population was 32.

Ethnicity in 2011
Ethnicity	Number	Percentage
Serbs	23	71.9%
other/undeclared	9	28.1%
Total	32	100%
