= Rudnica, Pljevlja =

Rudnica Рудница
- Village
- Location within Montenegro
- Country: Montenegro
- Municipality: Pljevlja

Population (2011)
  - Total: 124
- Time zone: UTC+1 (CET)
  - Summer (DST): UTC+2 (CEST)

Rudnica (Serbian Cyrillic: Рудница) is a village in the municipality of Pljevlja, Montenegro.

== Demographics ==
According to the 2003 census, the village had a population of 102 people.

According to the 2011 census, its population was 124.

Ethnicity in 2011
Ethnicity	Number	Percentage
Serbs	99	79.9%
Montenegrins	23	18.5%
other/undeclared	2	1.6%
Total	124	100%
