= Lever Tara =

Lever Tara Левер Тара
- Village
- Location within Montenegro
- Country: Montenegro
- Municipality: Pljevlja

Population (2011)
  - Total: 56
- Time zone: UTC+1 (CET)
  - Summer (DST): UTC+2 (CEST)

Lever Tara (Serbian Cyrillic: Левер Тара) is a village in the municipality of Pljevlja, Montenegro.

== Demographics ==
According to the 2003 census, the village had a population of 77 people.

According to the 2011 census, its population was 56.

Ethnicity in 2011
Ethnicity	Number	Percentage
Bosniaks	11	19.6%
Serbs	7	12.5%
other/undeclared	38	67.9%
Total	56	100%
