= Kordovina =

- Village
- Location within Montenegro
- Country: Montenegro
- Municipality: Pljevlja

Population (2011)
  - Total: 43
- Time zone: UTC+1 (CET)
  - Summer (DST): UTC+2 (CEST)

Kordovina (Serbian Cyrillic: Кордовина) is a small village in the municipality of Pljevlja, Montenegro.

== Demographics ==
According to the 2003 census, the village had a population of 48 people.

According to the 2011 census, its population was 43.

Ethnicity in 2011
Ethnicity	Number	Percentage
Serbs	39	90.7%
other/undeclared	4	9.3%
Total	43	100%
