= Kotlajići =

- Village
- Location within Montenegro
- Country: Montenegro
- Municipality: Pljevlja

Population (2011)
  - Total: 18
- Time zone: UTC+1 (CET)
  - Summer (DST): UTC+2 (CEST)

Kotlajići (Serbian Cyrillic: Котлајићи) is a hamlet in the municipality of Pljevlja, Montenegro.

== Demographics ==
According to the 2003 census, the village had a population of 54 people.

According to the 2011 census, its population was 18.

Ethnicity in 2011
Ethnicity	Number	Percentage
Serbs	16	88.9%
other/undeclared	2	11.1%
Total	18	100%
