= Jabuka, Pljevlja =

Jabuka Јабука
- Village
- Location within Montenegro
- Country: Montenegro
- Region: Northern
- Municipality: Pljevlja

Population (2011)
  - Total: 30
- Time zone: UTC+1 (CET)
  - Summer (DST): UTC+2 (CEST)

Jabuka (Montenegrin: Јабука) is a small village in the municipality of Pljevlja, Montenegro.

== Name ==
The name simply means "apple" in the native language

== Demographics ==
According to the 2003 census, the village had a population of 26 people.

According to the 2011 census, its population was 30.

Ethnicity in 2011
Ethnicity	Number	Percentage
Serbs	20	66.7%
other/undeclared	10	33.3%
Total	30	100%
