= Uremovići =

- Village
- Location within Montenegro
- Country: Montenegro
- Region: Northern
- Municipality: Pljevlja

Population (2011)
  - Total: 55
- Time zone: UTC+1 (CET)
  - Summer (DST): UTC+2 (CEST)

Uremovići (Montenegrin Cyrillic: Уремовићи) is a village in the municipality of Pljevlja, Montenegro.

== Demographics ==
According to the 2003 census, the village had a population of 106 people.

According to the 2011 census, its population was 55.

Ethnicity in 2011
Ethnicity	Number	Percentage
Serbs	29	52.7%
Montenegrins	22	40.0%
other/undeclared	4	7.3%
Total	55	100%
