= Donja Brvenica =

Donja Brvenica Доња Брвеница
- Village
- Location within Montenegro
- Country: Montenegro
- Region: Northern
- Municipality: Pljevlja

Population (2011)
  - Total: 118
- Time zone: UTC+1 (CET)
  - Summer (DST): UTC+2 (CEST)

Donja Brvenica (Montenegrin Cyrillic: Доња Брвеница) is a small village in the municipality of Pljevlja, Montenegro.

== Demographics ==
According to the 2003 census, the village had a population of 144 people.

According to the 2011 census, its population was 118.

Ethnicity in 2011
Ethnicity	Number	Percentage
Serbs	99	83.9%
Montenegrins	19	16.1%
Total	118	100%
