= Zabrđe, Pljevlja =

Zabrđe Забрђе
- Village
- Location within Montenegro
- Country: Montenegro
- Region: Northern
- Municipality: Pljevlja

Population (2011)
  - Total: 87
- Time zone: UTC+1 (CET)
  - Summer (DST): UTC+2 (CEST)

Zabrđe (Montenegrin Cyrillic: Забрђе) is a small village in the municipality of Pljevlja, Montenegro.

== Demographics ==
According to the 2003 census, the village had a population of 114 people.

According to the 2011 census, its population was 87.

Ethnicity in 2011
Ethnicity	Number	Percentage
Serbs	62	71.3%
Montenegrins	19	21.8%
other/undeclared	6	6.9%
Total	87	100%
