= Jasen, Montenegro =

Jasen
- Village
- Location within Montenegro
- Country: Montenegro
- Region: Northern
- Municipality: Pljevlja

Population (2011)
  - Total: 14
- Time zone: UTC+1 (CET)
  - Summer (DST): UTC+2 (CEST)

Jasen (Montenegrin Cyrillic: Јасен) is a small village in the municipality of Pljevlja, Montenegro.

== Demographics ==
According to the 2003 census, the village had a population of 18 people.

According to the 2011 census, its population was 14, all Serbs.
