= Potoci, Pljevlja =

Potoci Потоци
- Village
- Location within Montenegro
- Country: Montenegro
- Municipality: Pljevlja

Population (2011)
  - Total: 89
- Time zone: UTC+1 (CET)
  - Summer (DST): UTC+2 (CEST)

Potoci (Serbian Cyrillic: Потоци) is a village in the municipality of Pljevlja, Montenegro.

== Demographics ==
According to the 2003 census, the village had a population of 127 people.

According to the 2011 census, its population was 89.

Ethnicity in 2011
Ethnicity	Number	Percentage
Serbs	57	64.0%
Montenegrins	21	23.6%
other/undeclared	11	12.4%
Total	89	100%
