= Zaselje, Pljevlja =

Zaselje Засеље
- Village
- Location within Montenegro
- Country: Montenegro
- Region: Northern
- Municipality: Pljevlja

Population (2011)
  - Total: 45
- Time zone: UTC+1 (CET)
  - Summer (DST): UTC+2 (CEST)

Zaselje (Montenegrin Cyrillic: Засеље) is a small village in the municipality of Pljevlja, Montenegro.

== Demographics ==
According to the 2003 census, the village had a population of 62 people.

According to the 2011 census, its population was 45.

Ethnicity in 2011
Ethnicity	Number	Percentage
Serbs	17	37.8%
other/undeclared	28	62.2%
Total	45	100%
