= Varine =

- Village
- Location within Montenegro
- Country: Montenegro
- Municipality: Pljevlja

Population (2011)
  - Total: 72
- Time zone: UTC+1 (CET)
  - Summer (DST): UTC+2 (CEST)

Varine (Serbian Cyrillic: Варине) is a small village in the municipality of Pljevlja, Montenegro.

== Demographics ==
According to the 2003 census, the village had a population of 55 people.

According to the 2011 census, its population was 72.

Ethnicity in 2011
Ethnicity	Number	Percentage
Serbs	52	72.2%
Montenegrins	15	20.8%
other/undeclared	5	6.9%
Total	72	100%
