= Mironići =

Village in Pljevlja, Montenegro

- Village
- Location within Montenegro
- Country: Montenegro
- Municipality: Pljevlja

Population (2011)
  - Total: 17
- Time zone: UTC+1 (CET)
  - Summer (DST): UTC+2 (CEST)

Mironići (Serbian Cyrillic: Миронићи) is a small village in the municipality of Pljevlja, Montenegro.

== Demographics ==
According to the 2003 census, the village had a population of 25 people.

According to the 2011 census, its population was 17.

Ethnicity in 2011
Ethnicity	Number	Percentage
Serbs	16	94.1%
other/undeclared	1	5.9%
Total	17	100%
