= Beljkovići =

- Village
- Location within Montenegro
- Country: Montenegro
- Region: Northern
- Municipality: Pljevlja

Population (2011)
  - Total: 10
- Time zone: UTC+1 (CET)
  - Summer (DST): UTC+2 (CEST)

Beljkovići (Montenegrin Cyrillic: Бељковићи) is a small village in the municipality of Pljevlja, Montenegro.

== Demographics ==
According to the 2003 census, the village had a population of 28 people.

According to the 2011 census, its population was 10.

Ethnicity in 2011
Ethnicity	Number	Percentage
Montenegrins	8	80.0%
other/undeclared	2	20.0%
Total	10	100%
