= Potkovač =

- Village
- Location within Montenegro
- Country: Montenegro
- Municipality: Pljevlja

Population (2011)
  - Total: 83
- Time zone: UTC+1 (CET)
  - Summer (DST): UTC+2 (CEST)

Potkovač (Serbian Cyrillic: Потковач) is a small village in the municipality of Pljevlja, Montenegro.

== Demographics ==
According to the 2003 census, the village had a population of 84 people.

According to the 2011 census, its population was 83.

Ethnicity in 2011
Ethnicity	Number	Percentage
Serbs	57	68.7%
Montenegrins	11	13.3%
Bosniaks	6	7.2%
other/undeclared	9	10.8%
Total	83	100%
