= Šljivansko, Pljevlja =

Šljivansko Шљиванско
- Village
- Location within Montenegro
- Country: Montenegro
- Municipality: Pljevlja

Population (2011)
  - Total: 18
- Time zone: UTC+1 (CET)
  - Summer (DST): UTC+2 (CEST)

Šljivansko (Serbian Cyrillic: Шљиванско) is a small village in the municipality of Pljevlja, Montenegro.

== Demographics ==
According to the 2003 census, the village had a population of 36 people.

According to the 2011 census, its population was 18, all Serbs.
