= Kolijevka =

Kolijevka Колијевка
- Village
- Location within Montenegro
- Country: Montenegro
- Municipality: Pljevlja

Population (2003)
  - Total: 10
- Time zone: UTC+1 (CET)
  - Summer (DST): UTC+2 (CEST)

Kolijevka (Serbian Cyrillic: Колијевка) is a village in the municipality of Pljevlja, Montenegro.

== Demographics ==
According to the 2003 census, the village had a population of 10 people.
