= Zenica, Pljevlja =

Zenica
- Village
- Location within Montenegro
- Country: Montenegro
- Region: Northern
- Municipality: Pljevlja

Population (2011)
  - Total: 93
- Time zone: UTC+1 (CET)
  - Summer (DST): UTC+2 (CEST)

Zenica (Montenegrin Cyrillic: Зеница) is a small village in the municipality of Pljevlja, Montenegro.

== Demographics ==
According to the 2003 census, the village had a population of 131 people.

According to the 2011 census, its population was 93.

Ethnicity in 2011
| Ethnicity | Number | Percentage |
|---|---|---|
| Serbs | 75 | 80.6% |
| Montenegrins | 16 | 17.2% |
| other/undeclared | 2 | 2.2% |
| Total | 93 | 100% |
