= Lađana =

- Village
- Location within Montenegro
- Country: Montenegro
- Municipality: Pljevlja

Population (2011)
  - Total: 54
- Time zone: UTC+1 (CET)
  - Summer (DST): UTC+2 (CEST)

Lađana (Serbian Cyrillic: Лађана) is a small village in the municipality of Pljevlja, Montenegro; a region renowned for its natural geographical landmarks, including the Ljubišnja mountain and the Tara river canyon.

== Demographics ==
According to the 2003 census, the village had a population of 72 people.

According to the 2011 census, its population was 54.

Ethnicity in 2011
| Ethnicity | Number | Percentage |
|---|---|---|
| Serbs | 47 | 87.0% |
| Montenegrins | 6 | 11.1% |
| other/undeclared | 1 | 1.9% |
| Total | 54 | 100% |
