= Borišići =

Borišići Боришиће
- Village
- Location within Montenegro
- Country: Montenegro
- Region: Northern
- Municipality: Pljevlja

Population (2011)
  - Total: 34
- Time zone: UTC+1 (CET)
  - Summer (DST): UTC+2 (CEST)

Borišići (Montenegrin Cyrillic: Боришиће) is a small village in the municipality of Pljevlja, Montenegro.

== Demographics ==
According to the 2003 census, the village had a population of 37 people.

According to the 2011 census, its population was 34.

Ethnicity in 2011
| Ethnicity | Number | Percentage |
|---|---|---|
| Bosniaks | 7 | 20.6% |
| other/undeclared | 27 | 79.4% |
| Total | 34 | 100% |
