= Vaškovo =

- Village
- Location within Montenegro
- Country: Montenegro
- Municipality: Pljevlja

Population (2011)
  - Total: 40
- Time zone: UTC+1 (CET)
  - Summer (DST): UTC+2 (CEST)

Vaškovo (Serbian Cyrillic: Вашково) is a village in the municipality of Pljevlja, Montenegro.

== Demographics ==
According to the 2003 census, the village had a population of 68 people.

According to the 2011 census, its population was 40.

Ethnicity in 2011
Ethnicity	Number	Percentage
Serbs	29	72.5%
Montenegrins	10	25.0%
other/undeclared	1	2.5%
Total	40	100%
