= Crnobori =

- Village
- Location within Montenegro
- Country: Montenegro
- Region: Northern
- Municipality: Pljevlja

Population (2011)
  - Total: 33
- Time zone: UTC+1 (CET)
  - Summer (DST): UTC+2 (CEST)

Crnobori (Montenegrin Cyrillic: Црнобори) is a small village in the municipality of Pljevlja, Montenegro.

== Demographics ==
According to the 2003 census, the village had a population of 87 people.

According to the 2011 census, its population was 33.

Ethnicity in 2011
Ethnicity	Number	Percentage
Serbs	20	60.6%
Montenegrins	12	36.4%
other/undeclared	1	3.0%
Total	33	100%
