= Dragaši (Pljevlja) =

Dragaši Драгаши
- Village
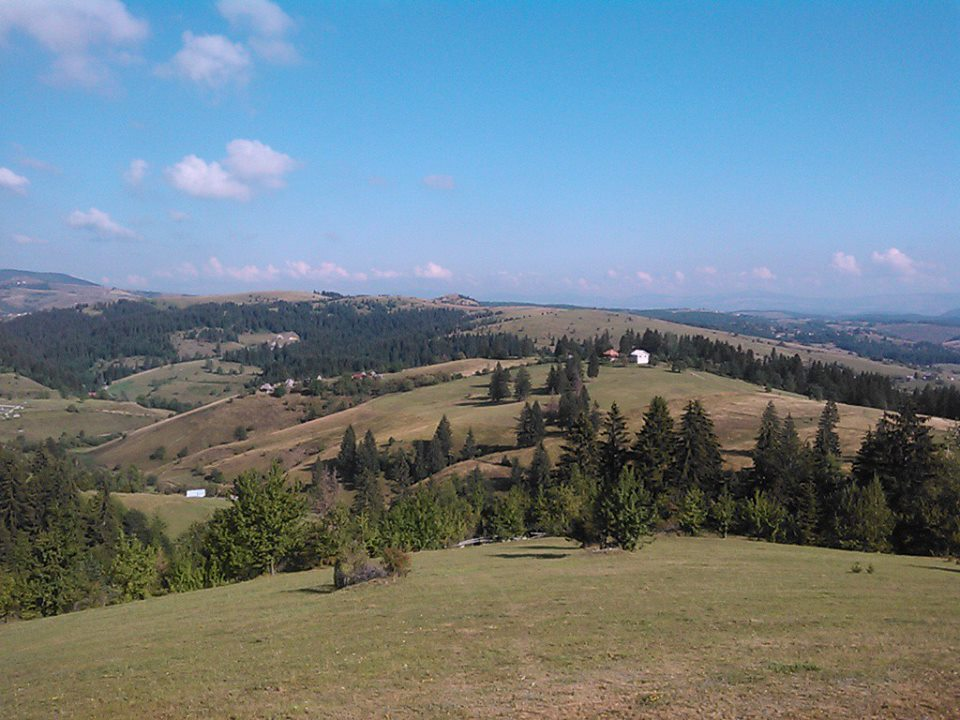
- Dragasi Landscape

- Location within Montenegro
- Country: Montenegro
- Region: Northern
- Municipality: Pljevlja

Population (2011)
  - Total: 44
- Time zone: UTC+1 (CET)
  - Summer (DST): UTC+2 (CEST)

Dragaši (Montenegrin Cyrillic: Драгаши) is a small village in the municipality of Pljevlja, Montenegro.

== Demographics ==
According to the 2003 census, the village had a population of 73 people.

According to the 2011 census, its population was 44.

Ethnicity in 2011
Ethnicity	Number	Percentage
Serbs	37	84.1%
Montenegrins	6	13.6%
other/undeclared	1	2.3%
Total	44	100%
