= Lugovi, Pljevlja =

Lugovi Лугови
- Village
- Location within Montenegro
- Country: Montenegro
- Municipality: Pljevlja

Population (2011)
  - Total: 6
- Time zone: UTC+1 (CET)
  - Summer (DST): UTC+2 (CEST)

Lugovi (Serbian Cyrillic: Лугови) is a small hamlet in the municipality of Pljevlja, Montenegro.

== Demographics ==
According to the 2003 census, the village had a population of 16 people.

According to the 2011 census, its population was 6.
