= Ograđenica =

Ograđenica Ограђеница
- Village
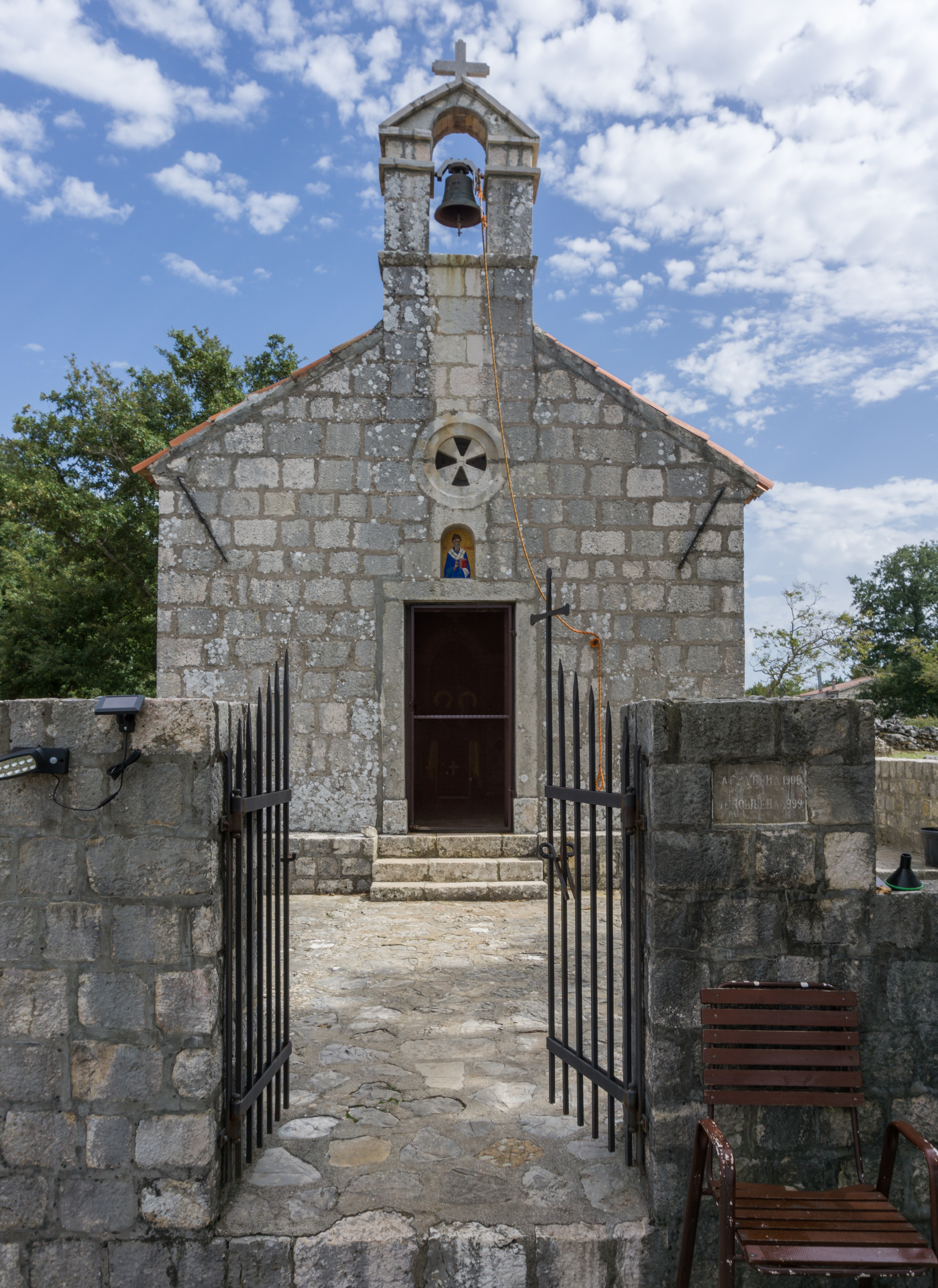

- Location within Montenegro
- Country: Montenegro
- Region: Northern
- Municipality: Pljevlja

Population (2011)
  - Total: 59
- Time zone: UTC+1 (CET)
  - Summer (DST): UTC+2 (CEST)

Ograđenica (Montenegrin Cyrillic: Ограђеница) is a small village in the municipality of Pljevlja, Montenegro.

== Demographics ==
According to the 2003 census, the village had a population of 89 people.

According to the 2011 census, its population was 59.

Ethnicity in 2011
Ethnicity	Number	Percentage
Serbs	44	74.6%
Montenegrins	15	25.4%
Total	59	100%
