= Tvrdakovići =

Tvrdakovići Тврдаковићи
- Village
- Location within Montenegro
- Country: Montenegro
- Region: Northern
- Municipality: Pljevlja

Population (2011)
  - Total: 9
- Time zone: UTC+1 (CET)
  - Summer (DST): UTC+2 (CEST)

Tvrdakovići (Montenegrin Cyrillic: Тврдаковићи) is a small hamlet in the municipality of Pljevlja, Montenegro.

== Demographics ==
According to the 2003 census, the village had a population of 21 people.

According to the 2011 census, its population was 9, all but two of them were Serbs.
