= Vilići =

- Village
- Location within Montenegro
- Country: Montenegro
- Municipality: Pljevlja

Population (2011)
  - Total: 54
- Time zone: UTC+1 (CET)
  - Summer (DST): UTC+2 (CEST)

Vilići (Serbian Cyrillic: Вилићи) is a village in the municipality of Pljevlja, Montenegro.

== Demographics ==
According to the 2003 census, the village had a population of 56 people.

According to the 2011 census, its population was 54.

Ethnicity in 2011
Ethnicity	Number	Percentage
Serbs	20	37.0%
Bosniaks	10	18.5%
other/undeclared	24	44.4%
Total	54	100%
