= Popov Do =

Popov Do Попов До
- Village
- Location within Montenegro
- Country: Montenegro
- Municipality: Pljevlja

Population (2011)
  - Total: 11
- Time zone: UTC+1 (CET)
  - Summer (DST): UTC+2 (CEST)

Popov Do (Serbian Cyrillic: Попов До) is a hamlet in the municipality of Pljevlja, Montenegro.

== Demographics ==
According to the 2003 census, the village had a population of 15 people.

According to the 2011 census, its population was 11, all but one of them were Serbs.
