= Komine, Montenegro =

Komine Комине
- Village
- Location within Montenegro
- Coordinates: 43.340737°N 19.315192°E
- Country: Montenegro
- Municipality: Pljevlja

Population (2011)
  - Total: 565
- Time zone: UTC+1 (CET)
  - Summer (DST): UTC+2 (CEST)

Komine (Serbian Cyrillic: Комине) is a village in the municipality of Pljevlja, Montenegro.

== Demographics ==
According to the 2003 census, the village had a population of 579 people.

According to the 2011 census, its population was 565.

Ethnicity in 2011
Ethnicity	Number	Percentage
Serbs	380	67.3%
Montenegrins	152	26.9%
other/undeclared	33	582%
Total	565	100%
