= Leovo Brdo =

Leovo Brdo Леово Брдо
- Village
- Location within Montenegro
- Country: Montenegro
- Municipality: Pljevlja

Population (2011)
  - Total: 16
- Time zone: UTC+1 (CET)
  - Summer (DST): UTC+2 (CEST)

Leovo Brdo (Serbian Cyrillic: Леово Брдо) is a small village in the municipality of Pljevlja, Montenegro.

== Demographics ==
According to the 2003 census, the village had a population of 24.

According to the 2011 census, its population was 165.

Ethnicity in 2011
Ethnicity	Number	Percentage
Serbs	11	68.8%
other/undeclared	5	31.3%
Total	16	100%
