= Šumani =

- Village
- Location within Montenegro
- Country: Montenegro
- Municipality: Pljevlja

Population (2011)
  - Total: 184
- Time zone: UTC+1 (CET)
  - Summer (DST): UTC+2 (CEST)

Šumani (Serbian Cyrillic: Шумани) is a village in the municipality of Pljevlja, Montenegro.

== Demographics ==
According to the 2003 census, the village had a population of 219 people.

According to the 2011 census, its population was 184.

Ethnicity in 2011
Ethnicity	Number	Percentage
Serbs	148	80.4%
Montenegrins	22	12.0%
other/undeclared	14	7.6%
Total	184	100%
