= Glibaći =

- Village
- Location within Montenegro
- Country: Montenegro
- Municipality: Pljevlja

Population (2011)
  - Total: 102
- Time zone: UTC+1 (CET)
  - Summer (DST): UTC+2 (CEST)

Glibaći (Serbian Cyrillic: Глибаћи) is a village in the municipality of Pljevlja, Montenegro.

== Demographics ==
According to the 2003 census, the village had a population of 111 people.

According to the 2011 census, its population was 102.

Ethnicity in 2011
Ethnicity	Number	Percentage
Serbs	84	82.4%
Montenegrins	17	16.7%
other/undeclared	1	1.0%
Total	102	100%
