= Čestin, Montenegro =

Čestin Честин
- Village
- Location within Montenegro
- Country: Montenegro
- Region: Northern
- Municipality: Pljevlja

Population (2011)
  - Total: 43
- Time zone: UTC+1 (CET)
  - Summer (DST): UTC+2 (CEST)

Čestin (Montenegrin Cyrillic: Честин) is a small village in the municipality of Pljevlja, Montenegro. It is located at the Bosnian border.

== Demographics ==
According to the 2003 census, the village had a population of 58 people.

According to the 2011 census, its population was 43.

Ethnicity in 2011
Ethnicity	Number	Percentage
Montenegrins	34	79.1%
Serbs	8	18.6%
other/undeclared	1	2.3%
Total	43	100%
