= Gornja Brvenica =

Gornja Brvenica Горња Брвеница
- Village
- Location within Montenegro
- Country: Montenegro
- Municipality: Pljevlja

Population (2011)
  - Total: 231
- Time zone: UTC+1 (CET)
  - Summer (DST): UTC+2 (CEST)

Gornja Brvenica (Serbian Cyrillic: Горња Брвеница) is a village in the municipality of Pljevlja, Montenegro.

== Demographics ==
According to the 2003 census, the village had a population of 291 people.

According to the 2011 census, its population was 231.

Ethnicity in 2011
Ethnicity	Number	Percentage
Serbs	192	83.1%
Montenegrins	30	13.0%
other/undeclared	9	3.9%
Total	231	100%
