= Pliješ =

Pliješ Плијеш
- Village
- Location within Montenegro
- Country: Montenegro
- Municipality: Pljevlja

Population (2011)
  - Total: 24
- Time zone: UTC+1 (CET)
  - Summer (DST): UTC+2 (CEST)

Pliješ (Serbian Cyrillic: Плијеш) is a village in the municipality of Pljevlja, Montenegro. It is located close to the Serbian border.

== Demographics ==
According to the 2003 census, the village had a population of 32 people.

According to the 2011 census, its population was 24, all but one of them were Serbs.
