= Rabitlje =

Rabitlje Рабитље
- Village
- Location within Montenegro
- Country: Montenegro
- Region: Northern
- Municipality: Pljevlja

Population (2011)
  - Total: 99
- Time zone: UTC+1 (CET)
  - Summer (DST): UTC+2 (CEST)

Rabitlje (Montenegrin Cyrillic: Рабитље) is a village in the municipality of Pljevlja, Montenegro.

== Demographics ==
According to the 2003 census, the village had a population of 118 people.

According to the 2011 census, its population was 99.

Ethnicity in 2011
Ethnicity	Number	Percentage
Montenegrins	49	49.5%
Serbs	43	43.4%
other/undeclared	7	7.1%
Total	99	100%
