= Kosanica, Montenegro =

Kosanica Косаница
- Village
- Location within Montenegro
- Coordinates: 43.195908°N 19.318538°E
- Country: Montenegro
- Municipality: Pljevlja

Population (2011)
  - Total: 182
- Time zone: UTC+1 (CET)
  - Summer (DST): UTC+2 (CEST)

Kosanica (Serbian Cyrillic: Косаница) is a village in the municipality of Pljevlja, Montenegro.

== Demographics ==
According to the 2003 census, the village had a population of 192 people.

According to the 2011 census, its population was 182.

Ethnicity in 2011
Ethnicity	Number	Percentage
Serbs	99	54.4%
Montenegrins	64	35.2%
other/undeclared	19	10.4%
Total	182	100%
