= Ljuće =

- Village
- Location within Montenegro
- Country: Montenegro
- Municipality: Pljevlja

Population (2011)
  - Total: 144
- Time zone: UTC+1 (CET)
  - Summer (DST): UTC+2 (CEST)

Ljuće (Serbian Cyrillic: Љуће) is a village in the municipality of Pljevlja, Montenegro.

== Demographics ==
According to the 2003 census, the village had a population of 207 people.

According to the 2011 census, its population was 144.

Ethnicity in 2011
Ethnicity	Number	Percentage
Serbs	111	77.1%
Montenegrins	15	10.4%
other/undeclared	18	12.5%
Total	144	100%
