= Male Krće =

- Village
- Location within Montenegro
- Country: Montenegro
- Municipality: Pljevlja

Population (2011)
  - Total: 78
- Time zone: UTC+1 (CET)
  - Summer (DST): UTC+2 (CEST)

Male Krće (Serbian Cyrillic: Мале Крће) is a small village in the municipality of Pljevlja, Montenegro.

== Demographics ==
According to the 2003 census, the village had a population of 142 people.

According to the 2011 census, its population was 78.

Ethnicity in 2011
Ethnicity	Number	Percentage
Serbs	58	74.4%
Montenegrins	20	25.6%
Total	78	100%
