= Plakala =

- Village
- Location within Montenegro
- Country: Montenegro
- Municipality: Pljevlja

Population (2003)
  - Total: 4
- Time zone: UTC+1 (CET)
  - Summer (DST): UTC+2 (CEST)

Plakala (Serbian Cyrillic: Плакала) is a small hamlet in Pljevlja Municipality, in northern Montenegro.

== Demographics ==
According to the 2003 census, the village had a population of 4 people.
