= Gradina, Pljevlja =

Gradina Градина
- Village
- Location within Montenegro
- Country: Montenegro
- Municipality: Pljevlja

Population (2011)
  - Total: 50
- Time zone: UTC+1 (CET)
  - Summer (DST): UTC+2 (CEST)

Gradina (Serbian Cyrillic: Градина) is a small village in the municipality of Pljevlja, Montenegro.

== Demographics ==
According to the 2003 census, the village had a population of 54 people.

According to the 2011 census, its population was 50.

=== Historical Population ===
Historical population
Year	1948	1953	1961	1971	1981	1991	2003
Pop.	182	228	261	205	168	98	54
±%	—	+25.3%	+14.5%	−21.5%	−18.0%	−41.7%	−44.9%
Source: Statistical Office of the Republic of Serbia

Ethnicity in 2011
Ethnicity	Number	Percentage
Serbs	41	82.0%
Montenegrins	8	16.0%
other/undeclared	1	2.0%
Total	50	100%
