= Mrzovići =

- Village
- Location within Montenegro
- Country: Montenegro
- Municipality: Pljevlja

Population (2011)
  - Total: 93
- Time zone: UTC+1 (CET)
  - Summer (DST): UTC+2 (CEST)

Mrzovići (Serbian Cyrillic: Мрзовићи) is a village in the municipality of Pljevlja, Montenegro.

== Demographics ==
According to the 2003 census, the village had a population of 134 people.

According to the 2011 census, its population was 93.

Ethnicity in 2011
Ethnicity	Number	Percentage
Serbs	68	73.1%
Montenegrins	18	19.4%
other/undeclared	7	7.5%
Total	93	100%
