= Pliješevina =

Pliješevina Плијешевина
- Village
- Location within Montenegro
- Country: Montenegro
- Municipality: Pljevlja

Population (2011)
  - Total: 48
- Time zone: UTC+1 (CET)
  - Summer (DST): UTC+2 (CEST)

Pliješevina (Serbian Cyrillic: Плијешевина) is a small village in the municipality of Pljevlja, Montenegro.

== Demographics ==
According to the 2003 census, the village had a population of 76. According to the 2011 census, its population was 48, 43 of whom were Serbs.
