= Brda, Pljevlja =

Brda Брда
- Village
- Location within Montenegro
- Country: Montenegro
- Region: Northern
- Municipality: Pljevlja

Population (2011)
  - Total: 103
- Time zone: UTC+1 (CET)
  - Summer (DST): UTC+2 (CEST)

Brda (Montenegrin Cyrillic: Брда) is a small village in the municipality of Pljevlja, Montenegro.

== Demographics ==
According to the 2003 census, the village had a population of 64 people.

According to the 2011 census, its population was 24.

Ethnicity in 2011
Ethnicity	Number	Percentage
Serbs	24	88.9%
other/undeclared	3	11.1%
Total	27	100%
