= Boščinovići =

- Village
- Location within Montenegro
- Country: Montenegro
- Region: Northern
- Municipality: Pljevlja

Population (2011)
  - Total: 105
- Time zone: UTC+1 (CET)
  - Summer (DST): UTC+2 (CEST)

Boščinovići (Montenegrin Cyrillic: Бошчиновићи) is a small village in the municipality of Pljevlja, Montenegro.

== Demographics ==
According to the 2003 census, the village had a population of 74 people.

According to the 2011 census, its population was 105.

Ethnicity in 2011
Ethnicity	Number	Percentage
Serbs	57	54.3%
Montenegrins	22	21.0%
other/undeclared	26	24.8%
Total	105	100%
