= Crno Brdo =

- Village
- Location within Montenegro
- Country: Montenegro
- Region: Northern
- Municipality: Pljevlja

Population (2011)
  - Total: 18
- Time zone: UTC+1 (CET)
  - Summer (DST): UTC+2 (CEST)

Crno Brdo (Montenegrin Cyrillic: Црно Брдо) is a small village in the municipality of Pljevlja, Montenegro. The toponym means black hill.

== Demographics ==
According to the 2003 census, the village had a population of 41 people.

According to the 2011 census, its population was 18.

Ethnicity in 2011
Ethnicity	Number	Percentage
Serbs	14	77.8%
other/undeclared	4	22.2%
Total	18	100%
