= Rujevica, Pljevlja =

Rujevica Рујевица
- Village
- Location within Montenegro
- Country: Montenegro
- Municipality: Pljevlja

Population (2011)
  - Total: 15
- Time zone: UTC+1 (CET)
  - Summer (DST): UTC+2 (CEST)

Rujevica (Serbian Cyrillic: Рујевица) is a hamlet in the municipality of Pljevlja, Montenegro.

== Demographics ==
According to the 2003 census, the village had a population of 19 people.

According to the 2011 census, its population was 15, all Serbs.
