= Bujaci =

Bujaci Бујаци
- Village
- Location within Montenegro
- Country: Montenegro
- Region: Northern
- Municipality: Pljevlja

Population (2011)
  - Total: 44
- Time zone: UTC+1 (CET)
  - Summer (DST): UTC+2 (CEST)

Bujaci (Montenegrin Cyrillic: Бујаци) is a small village in the municipality of Pljevlja, Montenegro.

== Demographics ==
According to the 2003 census, the village had a population of 30 people.

According to the 2011 census, its population was 44.

Ethnicity in 2011
Ethnicity	Number	Percentage
Montenegrins	24	54.4%
Serbs	20	45.5%
Total	44	100%
