= Borova, Montenegro =

Borova
- Village
- Location within Montenegro
- Country: Montenegro
- Region: Northern
- Municipality: Pljevlja

Population (2011)
  - Total: 69
- Time zone: UTC+1 (CET)
  - Summer (DST): UTC+2 (CEST)

Borova (Montenegrin Cyrillic: Борова) is a small village in the municipality of Pljevlja, Montenegro. It is located close to the Serbian border.

== Demographics ==
According to the 2003 census, the village had a population of 79 people.

According to the 2011 census, its population was 69.

Ethnicity in 2011
Ethnicity	Number	Percentage
Serbs	47	68.1%
Montenegrins	18	26.1%
other/undeclared	4	5.8%
Total	69	100%
