= Grevo =

Grevo Грево
- Village
- Location within Montenegro
- Country: Montenegro
- Municipality: Pljevlja

Population (2011)
  - Total: 88
- Time zone: UTC+1 (CET)
  - Summer (DST): UTC+2 (CEST)

Grevo (Serbian Cyrillic: Грево) is a small village in the municipality of Pljevlja, Montenegro.

== Demographics ==
According to the 2003 census, the village had a population of 216 people.

According to the 2011 census, its population was 88.

Ethnicity in 2011
| Ethnicity | Number | Percentage |
|---|---|---|
| Serbs | 56 | 63.6% |
| Montenegrins | 19 | 21.6% |
| other/undeclared | 13 | 14.8% |
| Total | 88 | 100% |
