= Zbljevo =

- Village
- Location within Montenegro
- Country: Montenegro
- Region: Northern
- Municipality: Pljevlja

Population (2011)
  - Total: 209
- Time zone: UTC+1 (CET)
  - Summer (DST): UTC+2 (CEST)

Zbljevo (Montenegrin Cyrillic: Збљево) is a village in the municipality of Pljevlja, Montenegro.

== Demographics ==
According to the 2003 census, the village had a population of 180 people.

According to the 2011 census, its population was 209.

Ethnicity in 2011
Ethnicity	Number	Percentage
Serbs	152	72.7%
Montenegrins	45	21.5%
other/undeclared	12	5.7%
Total	209	100%
