= Bušnje =

- Village
- Location within Montenegro
- Country: Montenegro
- Region: Northern
- Municipality: Pljevlja

Population (2011)
  - Total: 148
- Time zone: UTC+1 (CET)
  - Summer (DST): UTC+2 (CEST)

Bušnje (Montenegrin Cyrillic: Бушње) is a village in the municipality of Pljevlja, Montenegro.

== Demographics ==
According to the 2003 census, the village had a population of 162 people.

According to the 2011 census, its population was 148.

Ethnicity in 2011
Ethnicity	Number	Percentage
Serbs	116	78.4%
Montenegrins	26	17.6%
other/undeclared	6	4.1%
Total	148	100%
