= Kovačevići (Pljevlja) =

Kovačevići Ковачевићи
- Village
- Location within Montenegro
- Coordinates: 43°28′23″N 19°01′01″E
- Country: Montenegro
- Municipality: Pljevlja

Population (2011)
  - Total: 27
- Time zone: UTC+1 (CET)
  - Summer (DST): UTC+2 (CEST)

Kovačevići (Serbian Cyrillic: Ковачевићи) is a village in the municipality of Pljevlja, Montenegro.

== Demographics ==
According to the 2003 census, the village had a population of 48 people.

According to the 2011 census, its population was 27.

Ethnicity in 2011
Ethnicity	Number	Percentage
Serbs	17	63.0%
other/undeclared	10	37.0%
Total	27	100%
