= Dubrava, Pljevlja =

Dubrava
- Village
- Location within Montenegro
- Country: Montenegro
- Region: Northern
- Municipality: Pljevlja

Population (2011)
  - Total: 39
- Time zone: UTC+1 (CET)
  - Summer (DST): UTC+2 (CEST)

Dubrava (Montenegrin Cyrillic: Дубрава) is a small village in the municipality of Pljevlja, Montenegro.

== Demographics ==
According to the 2003 census, the village had a population of 63 people.

According to the 2011 census, its population was 39.

Ethnicity in 2011
Ethnicity	Number	Percentage
Serbs	25	64.1%
Montenegrins	8	20.5%
other/undeclared	6	15.4%
Total	39	100%
