= Crljenice =

- Village
- Location within Montenegro
- Country: Montenegro
- Region: Northern
- Municipality: Pljevlja

Population (2011)
  - Total: 310
- Time zone: UTC+1 (CET)
  - Summer (DST): UTC+2 (CEST)

Crljenice (Montenegrin Cyrillic: Црљенице) is a village in the municipality of Pljevlja, Montenegro.

== Demographics ==
According to the 2003 census, the village had a population of 363 people.

According to the 2011 census, its population was 310.

Ethnicity in 2011
Ethnicity	Number	Percentage
Serbs	222	71.6%
Montenegrins	75	24.2%
other/undeclared	13	4.2%
Total	310	100%
