= Šljuke =

Šljuke Шљуке
- Village
- Location within Montenegro
- Country: Montenegro
- Municipality: Pljevlja

Population (2011)
  - Total: 52
- Time zone: UTC+1 (CET)
  - Summer (DST): UTC+2 (CEST)

Šljuke (Serbian Cyrillic: Шљуке) is a small village in the municipality of Pljevlja, Montenegro.

== Demographics ==
According to the 2003 census, the village had a population of 82 people.

According to the 2011 census, its population was 52.

Ethnicity in 2011
| Ethnicity | Number | Percentage |
|---|---|---|
| Serbs | 43 | 82.7% |
| Montenegrins | 9 | 17.3% |
| Total | 52 | 100% |
