= Kotorac, Montenegro =

Kotorac Которац
- Village
- Location within Montenegro
- Coordinates: 43°25′50″N 19°11′15″E
- Country: Montenegro
- Municipality: Pljevlja

Population (2011)
  - Total: 16
- Time zone: UTC+1 (CET)
  - Summer (DST): UTC+2 (CEST)

Kotorac (Serbian Cyrillic: Которац) is a small village in the municipality of Pljevlja, Montenegro.

== Demographics ==
According to the 2003 census, the village had a population of 10 people.

According to the 2011 census, its population was 16.

Ethnicity in 2011
Ethnicity	Number	Percentage
Serbs	10	62.5%
Montenegrins	6	37.5%
Total	16	100%
