= Pračica =

Pračica Прачица
- Village
- Location within Montenegro
- Country: Montenegro
- Municipality: Pljevlja

Population (2011)
  - Total: 77
- Time zone: UTC+1 (CET)
  - Summer (DST): UTC+2 (CEST)

Pračica (Serbian Cyrillic: Прачица) is a village in the municipality of Pljevlja, Montenegro.

== Demographics ==
According to the 2003 census, the village had a population of 77 people.

According to the 2011 census, its population was 77.

Ethnicity in 2011
Ethnicity	Number	Percentage
Serbs	52	67.5%
Montenegrins	23	29.9%
other/undeclared	2	2.6%
Total	77	100%
