= Odžak, Montenegro =

Odžak
- Village
- Location within Montenegro
- Country: Montenegro
- Region: Northern
- Municipality: Pljevlja

Population (2011)
  - Total: 60
- Time zone: UTC+1 (CET)
  - Summer (DST): UTC+2 (CEST)

Odžak (Montenegrin Cyrillic: Оџак) is a small village in the municipality of Pljevlja, Montenegro.

== Demographics ==
According to the 2003 census, the village had a population of 87 people.

According to the 2011 census, its population was 60.

Ethnicity in 2011
Ethnicity	Number	Percentage
Serbs	17	28.3%
Bosniaks	42	25.5%
Montenegrins	13	21.7%
other/undeclared	30	50.0%
Total	60	100%
