= Rađevići =

- Village
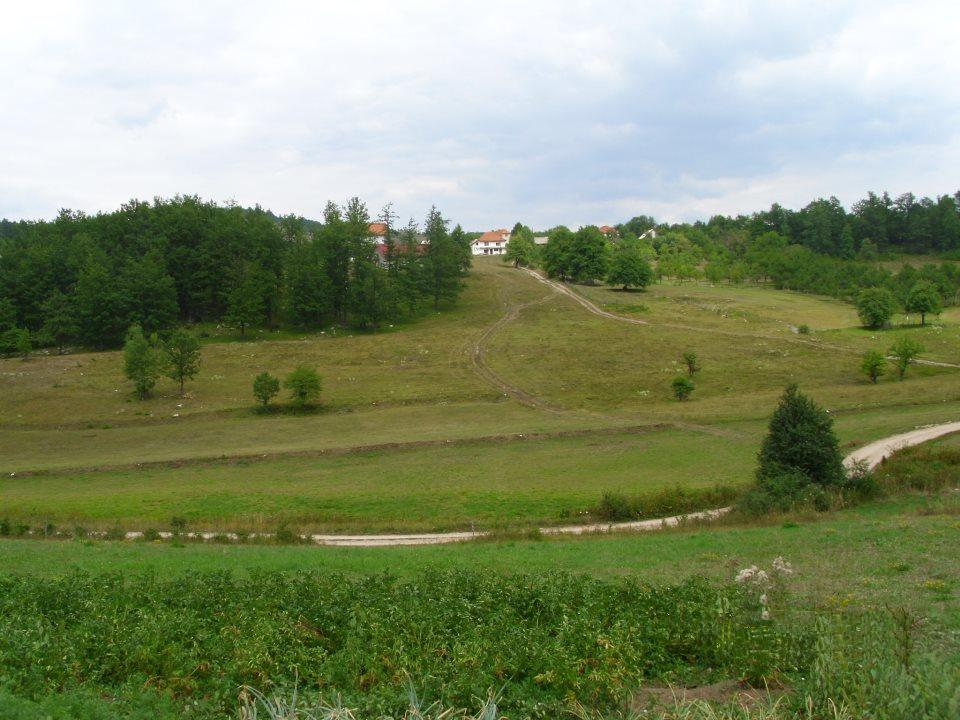
- Radjevici Landscape

- Location within Montenegro
- Country: Montenegro
- Municipality: Pljevlja

Population (2011)
  - Total: 61
- Time zone: UTC+1 (CET)
  - Summer (DST): UTC+2 (CEST)

Rađevići (Serbian Cyrillic: Рађевићи) is a small village in the municipality of Pljevlja, Montenegro.

== Demographics ==
According to the 2003 census, the village had a population of 95 people.

According to the 2011 census, its population was 61.

Ethnicity in 2011
Ethnicity	Number	Percentage
Serbs	55	90.2%
other/undeclared	6	9.8%
Total	61	100%
