= Pižure =

- Village
- Location within Montenegro
- Country: Montenegro
- Municipality: Pljevlja

Population (2011)
  - Total: 18
- Time zone: UTC+1 (CET)
  - Summer (DST): UTC+2 (CEST)

Pižure (Serbian Cyrillic: Пижуре) is a small hamlet in the municipality of Pljevlja, Montenegro.

== Demographics ==
According to the 2003 census, the village had a population of 40 people.

According to the 2011 census, its population was 18.

Ethnicity in 2011
Ethnicity	Number	Percentage
Serbs	6	33.3%
other/undeclared	12	66.7%
Total	18	100%
