= Selišta, Pljevlja =

Selišta Селишта
- Village
- Location within Montenegro
- Country: Montenegro
- Municipality: Pljevlja

Population (2011)
  - Total: 17
- Time zone: UTC+1 (CET)
  - Summer (DST): UTC+2 (CEST)

Selišta (Serbian Cyrillic: Селишта) is a village in the municipality of Pljevlja, Montenegro.

== Demographics ==
According to the 2003 census, the village had a population of 20 people.

According to the 2011 census, its population was 17.

Ethnicity in 2011
| Ethnicity | Number | Percentage |
|---|---|---|
| Serbs | 8 | 47.1% |
| other/undeclared | 9 | 52.9% |
| Total | 17 | 100% |
