= Prisoji =

- Village
- Location within Montenegro
- Country: Montenegro
- Municipality: Pljevlja

Population (2011)
  - Total: 32
- Time zone: UTC+1 (CET)
  - Summer (DST): UTC+2 (CEST)

Prisoji (Serbian Cyrillic: Присоји) is a small village in the municipality of Pljevlja, Montenegro.

== Demographics ==
According to the 2003 census, the village had a population of 51 people.

According to the 2011 census, its population was 32.

Ethnicity in 2011
| Ethnicity | Number | Percentage |
|---|---|---|
| Serbs | 29 | 90.6% |
| other/undeclared | 3 | 9.4% |
| Total | 32 | 100% |
