= Čardak, Pljevlja =

Čardak Чардак
- Village
- Location within Montenegro
- Country: Montenegro
- Region: Northern
- Municipality: Pljevlja

Population (2023)
  - Total: 20
- Time zone: UTC+1 (CET)
  - Summer (DST): UTC+2 (CEST)

Čardak (Montenegrin Cyrillic: Чардак) is a small village in the municipality of Pljevlja, Montenegro.

== Demographics ==
Its population was 25 at the 2003 census, 30 at the 2011 census, and 20 at the 2023 census.

Ethnicity in 2011
Ethnicity	Number	Percentage
Serbs	28	93.3%
Other/undeclared	2	6.7%
Total	30	100%
