= Krupice, Montenegro =

Krupice
- Village
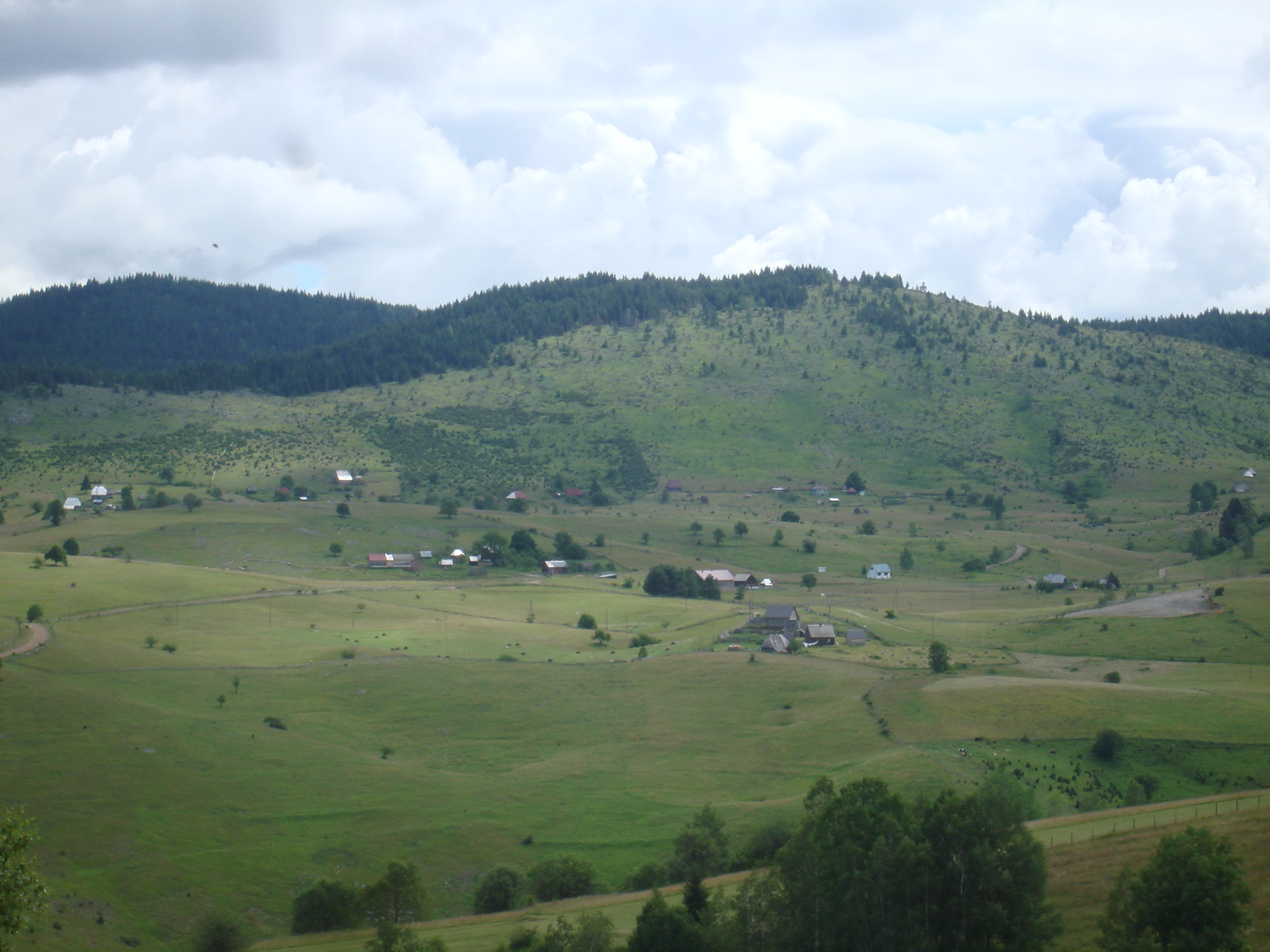
- Selo Krupice 2014

- Location within Montenegro
- Country: Montenegro
- Municipality: Pljevlja

Population (2011)
  - Total: 50
- Time zone: UTC+1 (CET)
  - Summer (DST): UTC+2 (CEST)

Krupice (Serbian Cyrillic: Крупице) is a small village in the municipality of Pljevlja, Montenegro.

== Demographics ==
According to the 2003 census, the village had a population of 111 people.

According to the 2011 census, its population was 50.

Ethnicity in 2011
Ethnicity	Number	Percentage
Montenegrins	22	44.0%
Serbs	21	42.2%
other/undeclared	7	14.0%
Total	50	100%
