= Obarde =

- Village
- Location within Montenegro
- Country: Montenegro
- Region: Northern
- Municipality: Pljevlja

Population (2011)
  - Total: 125
- Time zone: UTC+1 (CET)
  - Summer (DST): UTC+2 (CEST)

Obarde (Montenegrin Cyrillic: Обарде) is a village in the municipality of Pljevlja, Montenegro. It is located near the Serbian border.

== Demographics ==
According to the 2003 census, the village had a population of 165 people.

According to the 2011 census, its population was 125.

Ethnicity in 2011
Ethnicity	Number	Percentage
Serbs	80	64.0%
Montenegrins	39	31.2%
other/undeclared	6	4.8%
Total	125	100%
