= Glisnica, Montenegro =

Glisnica
- Village
- Location within Montenegro
- Country: Montenegro
- Municipality: Pljevlja

Population (2011)
  - Total: 139
- Time zone: UTC+1 (CET)
  - Summer (DST): UTC+2 (CEST)

Glisnica (Serbian Cyrillic: Глисница) is a village in the municipality of Pljevlja, Montenegro.

== Demographics ==
According to the 2003 census, the village had a population of 152 people.

According to the 2011 census, its population was 139.

Ethnicity in 2011
Ethnicity	Number	Percentage
Serbs	85	61.2%
Montenegrins	41	29.5%
other/undeclared	13	9.4%
Total	139	100%
