= Jugovo =

- Village
- Location within Montenegro
- Country: Montenegro
- Region: Northern
- Municipality: Pljevlja

Population (2011)
  - Total: 95
- Time zone: UTC+1 (CET)
  - Summer (DST): UTC+2 (CEST)

Jugovo (Montenegrin Cyrillic: Југово) is a small village in the municipality of Pljevlja, Montenegro.

== Demographics ==
According to the 2003 census, the village had a population of 163 people.

According to the 2011 census, its population was 95.

Ethnicity in 2011
Ethnicity	Number	Percentage
Serbs	71	74.7%
Montenegrins	24	25.3%
Total	95	100%
