= Trnovice =

Trnovice Трновице
- Village
- Location within Montenegro
- Coordinates: 43°21′21″N 19°11′28″E
- Country: Montenegro
- Region: Northern
- Municipality: Pljevlja

Population (2011)
  - Total: 55
- Time zone: UTC+1 (CET)
  - Summer (DST): UTC+2 (CEST)

Trnovice (Montenegrin Cyrillic: Трновице) is a small village in the municipality of Pljevlja, Montenegro.

== Demographics ==
According to the 2003 census, the village had a population of 54 people.

According to the 2011 census, its population was 55.

Ethnicity in 2011
Ethnicity	Number	Percentage
Serbs	39	70.9%
Montenegrins	16	29.1%
Total	55	100%
