= Židovići =

Židovići Жидовићи
- Town
- Location within Montenegro
- Coordinates: 43°21′10″N 19°19′01″E
- Country: Montenegro
- Region: Northern
- Municipality: Pljevlja

Population (2011)
  - Total: 694
- Time zone: UTC+1 (CET)
  - Summer (DST): UTC+2 (CEST)

Židovići (Montenegrin Cyrillic: Жидовићи) is a small town in the municipality of Pljevlja, Montenegro.

== Demographics ==
According to the 2003 census, the town had a population of 653 people.

According to the 2011 census, its population was 694.

Ethnicity in 2011
Ethnicity	Number	Percentage
Serbs	517	74.5%
Montenegrins	141	20.3%
other/undeclared	36	5.2%
Total	694	100%
