= Vodno, Montenegro =

Vodno
- Village
- Location within Montenegro
- Country: Montenegro
- Municipality: Pljevlja

Population (2011)
  - Total: 27
- Time zone: UTC+1 (CET)
  - Summer (DST): UTC+2 (CEST)

Vodno (Serbian Cyrillic: Водно) is a small village in the municipality of Pljevlja, Montenegro.

== Demographics ==
According to the 2003 census, the village had a population of 57 people.

According to the 2011 census, its population was 27 with 24 of them being Serbs.
