= Geuši =

- Village
- Location within Montenegro
- Country: Montenegro
- Municipality: Pljevlja

Population (2011)
  - Total: 6
- Time zone: UTC+1 (CET)
  - Summer (DST): UTC+2 (CEST)

Geuši (Serbian Cyrillic: Геуши) is a village in the municipality of Pljevlja, Montenegro.

== Demographics ==
According to the 2003 census, the village had a population of 10 people.

According to the 2011 census, its population was 6.

Ethnicity in 2011
| Ethnicity | Number | Percentage |
|---|---|---|
| Serbs | 6 | 100.0% |
| Total | 6 | 100% |
