= Vrbica, Pljevlja =

Vrbica Врбица
- Village
- Location within Montenegro
- Country: Montenegro
- Municipality: Pljevlja

Population (2011)
  - Total: 47
- Time zone: UTC+1 (CET)
  - Summer (DST): UTC+2 (CEST)

Vrbica (Serbian Cyrillic: Врбица) is a village in the municipality of Pljevlja, Montenegro.

== Demographics ==
According to the 2003 census, the village had a population of 38 people.

According to the 2011 census, its population was 47.

Ethnicity in 2011
Ethnicity	Number	Percentage
Serbs	41	87.2%
Montenegrins	6	12.8%
Total	47	100%
