= Cerovci =

Cerovci Церовци
- Village
- Location within Montenegro
- Country: Montenegro
- Region: Northern
- Municipality: Pljevlja

Population (2011)
  - Total: 26
- Time zone: UTC+1 (CET)
  - Summer (DST): UTC+2 (CEST)

Cerovci (Montenegrin Cyrillic: Церовци) is a small village in the municipality of Pljevlja, Montenegro.

== Demographics ==
According to the 2003 census, the village had a population of 71 people.

According to the 2011 census, its population was 26.

Ethnicity in 2011
Ethnicity	Number	Percentage
Serbs	22	84.6%
other/undeclared	4	15.4%
Total	26	100%
