= Gotovuša, Montenegro =

Gotovuša Готовуша
- Village
- Country: Montenegro
- Municipality: Pljevlja

Population (2011)
  - Total: 147
- Time zone: UTC+1 (CET)
  - Summer (DST): UTC+2 (CEST)

Gotovuša (Serbian Cyrillic: Готовуша) is a village in the municipality of Pljevlja, Montenegro.

== Demographics ==
According to the 2003 census, the village had a population of 150 people.

According to the 2011 census, its population was 147.

Ethnicity in 2011
Ethnicity	Number	Percentage
Serbs	132	89.8%
Montenegrins	10	6.8%
other/undeclared	5	3.4%
Total	147	100%
