= Velike Krće =

- Village
- Location within Montenegro
- Country: Montenegro
- Municipality: Pljevlja

Population (2011)
  - Total: 133
- Time zone: UTC+1 (CET)
  - Summer (DST): UTC+2 (CEST)

Velike Krće (Serbian Cyrillic: Велике Крће) is a village in the municipality of Pljevlja, Montenegro.

== Demographics ==
According to the 2003 census, the village had a population of 171 people.

According to the 2011 census, its population was 133.

Ethnicity in 2011
Ethnicity	Number	Percentage
Serbs	93	69.9%
Bosniaks	42	25.5%
Montenegrins	20	15.0%
other/undeclared	20	15.0%
Total	133	100%
