= Kotline =

- Village
- Location within Montenegro
- Country: Montenegro
- Municipality: Pljevlja

Population (2011)
  - Total: 68
- Time zone: UTC+1 (CET)
  - Summer (DST): UTC+2 (CEST)

Kotline (Serbian Cyrillic: Котлине) is a village in the municipality of Pljevlja, Montenegro.

== Demographics ==
According to the 2003 census, the village had a population of 81 people.

According to the 2011 census, its population was 68.

Ethnicity in 2011
Ethnicity	Number	Percentage
Serbs	47	69.1%
Montenegrins	20	29.4%
other/undeclared	1	1.5%
Total	68	100%
