= Prošće =

- Village
- Location within Montenegro
- Country: Montenegro
- Municipality: Pljevlja

Population (2003)
  - Total: 2
- Time zone: UTC+1 (CET)
  - Summer (DST): UTC+2 (CEST)

Prošće (Serbian Cyrillic: Прошће) is a hamlet in Pljevlja Municipality, in northern Montenegro.

== Demographics ==
According to the 2003 census, the village had a population of 2 people.
