= Lijeska, Pljevlja =

Lijeska
- Village
- Location within Montenegro
- Country: Montenegro
- Municipality: Pljevlja

Population (2011)
  - Total: 91
- Time zone: UTC+1 (CET)
  - Summer (DST): UTC+2 (CEST)

Lijeska (Serbian Cyrillic: Лијеска) is a village in the municipality of Pljevlja, Montenegro.

== Demographics ==
According to the 2003 census, the village had a population of 100 people.

According to the 2011 census, its population was 91.

Ethnicity in 2011
Ethnicity	Number	Percentage
Serbs	70	76.9%
Montenegrins	16	17.6%
other/undeclared	5	5.5%
Total	91	100%
