= Durutovići =

- Village
- Location within Montenegro
- Country: Montenegro
- Region: Northern
- Municipality: Pljevlja

Population (2011)
  - Total: 53
- Time zone: UTC+1 (CET)
  - Summer (DST): UTC+2 (CEST)

Durutovići (Montenegrin Cyrillic: Дурутовићи) is a small village in the municipality of Pljevlja, Montenegro.

== Demographics ==
According to the 2003 census, the village had a population of 93 people.

According to the 2011 census, its population was 53.

Ethnicity in 2011
Ethnicity	Number	Percentage
Bosniaks	28	52.8%
Serbs	8	15.1%
other/undeclared	17	32.1%
Total	53	100%
