= Krćevina =

- Village
- Location within Montenegro
- Country: Montenegro
- Municipality: Pljevlja

Population (2011)
  - Total: 30
- Time zone: UTC+1 (CET)
  - Summer (DST): UTC+2 (CEST)

Krćevina (Serbian Cyrillic: Крћевина) is a small village in the municipality of Pljevlja, Montenegro.

== Demographics ==
According to the 2003 census, the village had a population of 34 people.

According to the 2011 census, its population was 30.

Ethnicity in 2011
Ethnicity	Number	Percentage
Serbs	27	90.0%
other/undeclared	3	10.0%
Total	30	100%
