= Milunići =

- Village
- Location within Montenegro
- Country: Montenegro
- Municipality: Pljevlja

Population (2011)
  - Total: 98
- Time zone: UTC+1 (CET)
  - Summer (DST): UTC+2 (CEST)

Milunići (Serbian Cyrillic: Милунићи) is a village in the municipality of Pljevlja, Montenegro.

== Demographics ==
According to the 2003 census, the village had a population of 126 people.

According to the 2011 census, its population was 98.

Ethnicity in 2011
Ethnicity	Number	Percentage
Serbs	86	87.8%
Montenegrins	11	11.2%
other/undeclared	1	1.0%
Total	98	100%
