= Borovica, Montenegro =

Borovica
- Village
- Location within Montenegro
- Country: Montenegro
- Region: Northern
- Municipality: Pljevlja

Population (2011)
  - Total: 204
- Time zone: UTC+1 (CET)
  - Summer (DST): UTC+2 (CEST)

Borovica (Montenegrin Cyrillic: Боровица) is a village in the municipality of Pljevlja, Montenegro.

== Demographics ==
According to the 2003 census, the village had a population of 187 people.

According to the 2011 census, its population was 204.

Ethnicity in 2011
Ethnicity	Number	Percentage
Serbs	160	78.4%
Montenegrins	41	20.1%
other/undeclared	3	1.5%
Total	204	100%
