= Meljak, Montenegro =

Meljak Мељак
- Village
- Location within Montenegro
- Country: Montenegro
- Municipality: Pljevlja

Population (2011)
  - Total: 22
- Time zone: UTC+1 (CET)
  - Summer (DST): UTC+2 (CEST)

Meljak (Serbian Cyrillic: Мељак) is a village in the municipality of Pljevlja, Montenegro.

== Demographics ==
According to the 2003 census, the village had a population of 31 people.

According to the 2011 census, its population was 22.

Ethnicity in 2011
Ethnicity	Number	Percentage
Serbs	15	68.2%
other/undeclared	7	31.8%
Total	22	100%
