= Pušanjski Do =

- Village
- Location within Montenegro
- Country: Montenegro
- Municipality: Pljevlja

Population (2011)
  - Total: 59
- Time zone: UTC+1 (CET)
  - Summer (DST): UTC+2 (CEST)

Pušanjski Do (Serbian Cyrillic: Пушањски До) is a village in the municipality of Pljevlja, Montenegro.

== Demographics ==
According to the 2003 census, the village had a population of 77 people.

According to the 2011 census, its population was 59.

Ethnicity in 2011
Ethnicity	Number	Percentage
Serbs	40	67.8%
Montenegrins	17	28.8%
other/undeclared	2	3.4%
Total	59	100%
