= Kakmuži =

Kakmuži Какмужи
- Village
- Location within Montenegro
- Country: Montenegro
- Region: Northern
- Municipality: Pljevlja

Population (2011)
  - Total: 146
- Time zone: UTC+1 (CET)
  - Summer (DST): UTC+2 (CEST)

Kakmuži (Montenegrin Cyrillic: Какмужи) is a village in the municipality of Pljevlja, Montenegro.

== Demographics ==
According to the 2003 census, the village had a population of 190 people.

According to the 2011 census, its population was 146.

Ethnicity in 2011
| Ethnicity | Number | Percentage |
|---|---|---|
| Serbs | 112 | 76.6% |
| Montenegrins | 24 | 16.4% |
| other/undeclared | 10 | 6.8% |
| Total | 146 | 100% |
