= Podborova =

- Village
- Location within Montenegro
- Country: Montenegro
- Municipality: Pljevlja

Population (2011)
  - Total: 87
- Time zone: UTC+1 (CET)
  - Summer (DST): UTC+2 (CEST)

Podborova (Serbian Cyrillic: Подборова) is a small village in the municipality of Pljevlja, Montenegro.

== Demographics ==
According to the 2003 census, the village had a population of 94 people.

According to the 2011 census, its population was 87.

Ethnicity in 2011
Ethnicity	Number	Percentage
Serbs	50	57.5%
Montenegrins	18	20.7%
other/undeclared	19	21.8%
Total	87	100%
