= Strahov Do =

- Village
- Location within Montenegro
- Country: Montenegro
- Municipality: Pljevlja

Population (2011)
  - Total: 91
- Time zone: UTC+1 (CET)
  - Summer (DST): UTC+2 (CEST)

Strahov Do (Serbian Cyrillic: Страхов До) is a village in the municipality of Pljevlja, Montenegro.

== Demographics ==
According to the 2003 census, the village had a population of 111 people.

According to the 2011 census, its population was 91, all but 6 of them were Serbs.
