= Višnjica, Montenegro =

Višnjica Вишњића
- Village
- Location within Montenegro
- Country: Montenegro
- Municipality: Pljevlja

Population (2011)
  - Total: 34
- Time zone: UTC+1 (CET)
  - Summer (DST): UTC+2 (CEST)

Višnjica (Serbian Cyrillic: Вишњића) is a small village in the municipality of Pljevlja, Montenegro.

== Demographics ==
According to the 2003 census, the village had a population of 73 people.

According to the 2011 census, its population was 34, with 31 of them being Serbs.
