= Slatina, Pljevlja =

Slatina Слатина
- Village
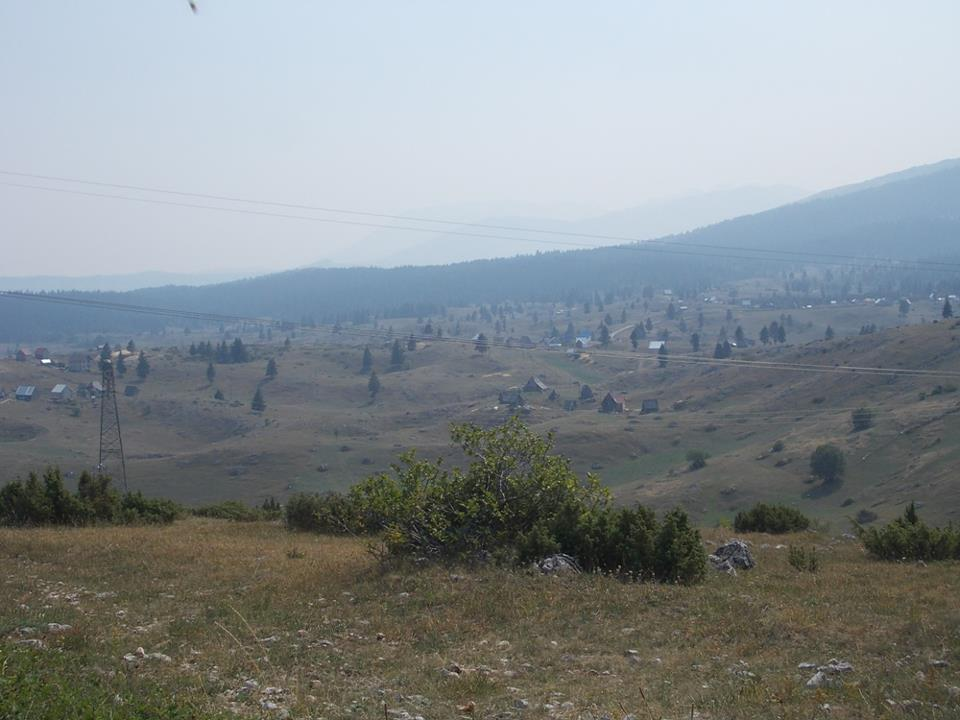
- View of Slatina Landscape

- Location within Montenegro
- Country: Montenegro
- Municipality: Pljevlja

Population (2011)
  - Total: 107
- Time zone: UTC+1 (CET)
  - Summer (DST): UTC+2 (CEST)

Slatina (Serbian Cyrillic: Слатина) is a village in the municipality of Pljevlja, Montenegro situated near the border with Serbia.

== Demographics ==
According to the 2003 census, the village had a population of 164 people.

According to the 2011 census, its population was 107.

Ethnicity in 2011
Ethnicity	Number	Percentage
Serbs	81	75.7%
Montenegrins	20	18.7%
other/undeclared	6	5.6%
Total	107	100%
