= Poblaće =

- Village
- Location within Montenegro
- Country: Montenegro
- Municipality: Pljevlja

Population (2011)
  - Total: 70
- Time zone: UTC+1 (CET)
  - Summer (DST): UTC+2 (CEST)

Poblaće (Serbian Cyrillic: Поблаће) is a small village in the municipality of Pljevlja, Montenegro.

== Demographics ==
According to the 2003 census, the village had a population of 101 people.

According to the 2011 census, its population was 70.

Ethnicity in 2011
Ethnicity	Number	Percentage
Serbs	65	92.9%
other/undeclared	5	7.1%
Total	70	100%
