= Hoćevina =

- Village
- Location within Montenegro
- Country: Montenegro
- Region: Northern
- Municipality: Pljevlja

Population (2011)
  - Total: 123
- Time zone: UTC+1 (CET)
  - Summer (DST): UTC+2 (CEST)

Hoćevina (Montenegrin Cyrillic: Хоћевина) is a village in the municipality of Pljevlja, Montenegro.

== Demographics ==
According to the 2003 census, the village had a population of 167 people.

[According to the 2011 census, its population was 123.

Ethnicity in 2011
Ethnicity	Number	Percentage
Serbs	96	78.0%
Montenegrins	24	19.5%
other/undeclared	3	2.4%
Total	123	100%
