= Moraice =

Moraice Мораице
- Village
- Location within Montenegro
- Country: Montenegro
- Municipality: Pljevlja

Population (2011)
  - Total: 46
- Time zone: UTC+1 (CET)
  - Summer (DST): UTC+2 (CEST)

Moraice (Serbian Cyrillic: Мораице) is a village in the municipality of Pljevlja, Montenegro.

== Demographics ==
According to the 2003 census, the village had a population of 108 people.

According to the 2011 census, its population was 46.

Ethnicity in 2011
Ethnicity	Number	Percentage
Serbs	42	91.3%
other/undeclared	4	8.7%
Total	46	100%
