= Kozica, Pljevlja =

Kozica Козица
- Village
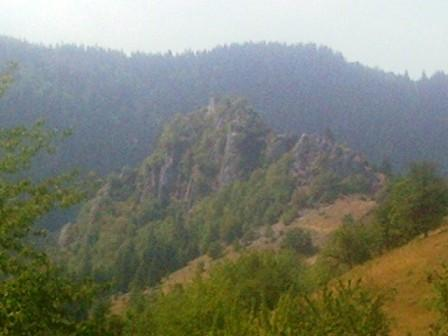
- Remains of the medieval castrum of Koznik, in the village of Kozica

- Location within Montenegro
- Country: Montenegro
- Municipality: Pljevlja

Population (2011)
  - Total: 142
- Time zone: UTC+1 (CET)
  - Summer (DST): UTC+2 (CEST)

Kozica (Serbian Cyrillic: Козица) is a small village in the municipality of Pljevlja, Montenegro.

== Demographics ==
According to the 2003 census, the village had a population of 153 people.

According to the 2011 census, its population was 142.

Ethnicity in 2011
Ethnicity	Number	Percentage
Serbs	126	88.7%
Montenegrins	11	7.7%
other/undeclared	5	3.5%
Total	142	100%
