= Kalušići =

- Village
- Location within Montenegro
- Country: Montenegro
- Municipality: Pljevlja

Population (2011)
  - Total: 256
- Time zone: UTC+1 (CET)
  - Summer (DST): UTC+2 (CEST)

Kalušići (Serbian Cyrillic: Калушићи) is a village in the municipality of Pljevlja, Montenegro.

== Demographics ==
According to the 2003 census, the village had a population of 193 people.

According to the 2011 census, its population was 256.

Ethnicity in 2011
Ethnicity	Number	Percentage
Serbs	178	69.5%
Montenegrins	64	25.0%
other/undeclared	14	5.5%
Total	256	100%
