= Zekavice =

- Village
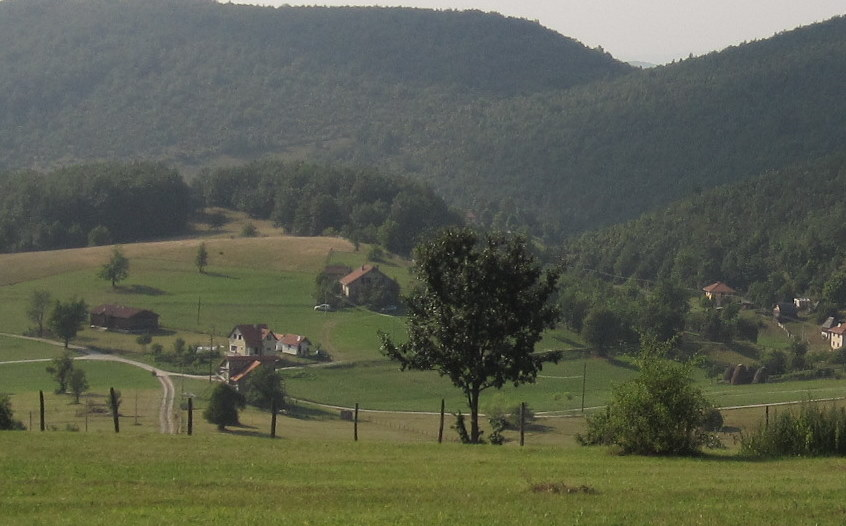

- Location within Montenegro
- Country: Montenegro
- Region: Northern
- Municipality: Pljevlja

Population (2011)
  - Total: 88
- Time zone: UTC+1 (CET)
  - Summer (DST): UTC+2 (CEST)

Zekavice (Montenegrin Cyrillic: Зекавице) is a small village in the municipality of Pljevlja, Montenegro.

== Demographics ==
According to the 2003 census, the village had a population of 121 people.

According to the 2011 census, its population was 88.

Ethnicity in 2011
Ethnicity	Number	Percentage
Serbs	75	85.2%
Montenegrins	12	13.6%
other/undeclared	1	1.1%
Total	88	100%
