= Jahovići =

- Village
- Location within Montenegro
- Country: Montenegro
- Region: Northern
- Municipality: Pljevlja

Population (2011)
  - Total: 9
- Time zone: UTC+1 (CET)
  - Summer (DST): UTC+2 (CEST)

Jahovići (Montenegrin Cyrillic: Јаховићи) is a hamlet in the municipality of Pljevlja, Montenegro.

== Demographics ==
According to the 2003 census, the village had a population of 16 people.

According to the 2011 census, its population was 9.

Ethnicity in 2011
Ethnicity	Number	Percentage
Serbs	7	77.8%
other/undeclared	2	22.2%
Total	9	100%
