= Mijakovići, Pljevlja =

Mijakovići Мијаковићи
- Village
- Location within Montenegro
- Country: Montenegro
- Municipality: Pljevlja

Population (2011)
  - Total: 73
- Time zone: UTC+1 (CET)
  - Summer (DST): UTC+2 (CEST)

Mijakovići (Serbian Cyrillic: Мијаковићи) is a village in the municipality of Pljevlja, Montenegro.

== Demographics ==
According to the 2003 census, the village had a population of 105 people.

According to the 2011 census, its population was 73.

Ethnicity in 2011
Ethnicity	Number	Percentage
Serbs	58	79.5%
Montenegrins	15	20.5%
Total	73	100%
