= Bjeloševina, Pljevlja =

Bjeloševina Бјелошевина
- Village
- Location within Montenegro
- Country: Montenegro
- Region: Northern
- Municipality: Pljevlja

Population (2011)
  - Total: 14
- Time zone: UTC+1 (CET)
  - Summer (DST): UTC+2 (CEST)

Bjeloševina (Montenegrin Cyrillic: Бјелошевина) is a small village in the municipality of Pljevlja, Montenegro.

== Demographics ==
According to the 2003 census, the village had a population of 15 people.

According to the 2011 census, its population was 14.

Ethnicity in 2011
Ethnicity	Number	Percentage
Serbs	14	100.0%
Total	14	100%
