= Orlja (Pirot) =

- Village
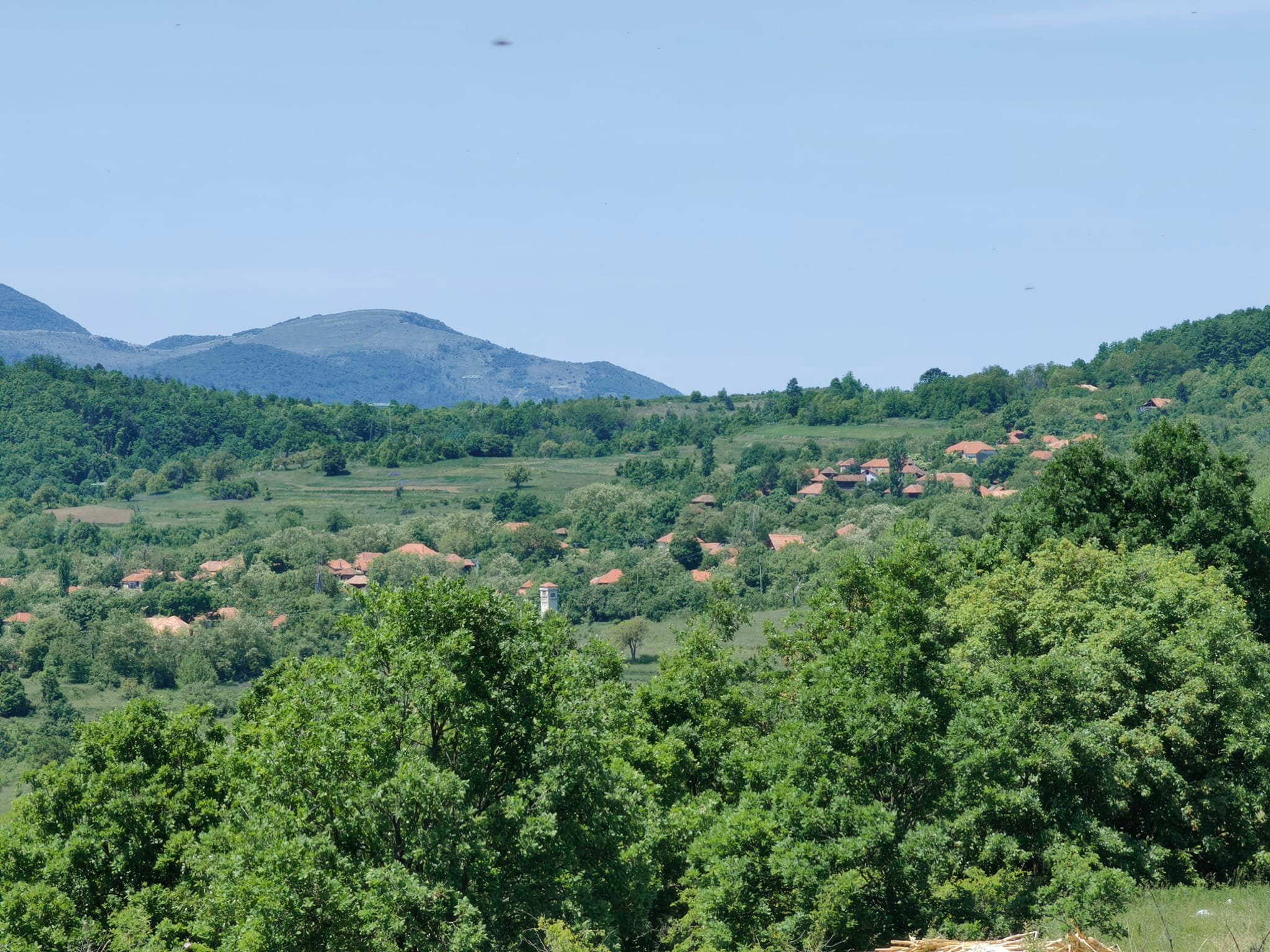

- Location within Serbia
- Country: Serbia
- Region: Southern and Eastern Serbia
- District: Pirot
- Municipality: Pirot

Population (2002)
  - Total: 75
- Time zone: UTC+1 (CET)
  - Summer (DST): UTC+2 (CEST)

Orlja is a village in the municipality of Pirot, Serbia. According to the 2002 census, the village has a population of 75 people.

== Shale deposit ==
Orjla sits on an oil shale deposit, which has oil shale reserves amounting to 70 million tonnes, one of the largest oil shale reserves in Serbia and Europe. The deposit has an organic content equivalent to 1.5 million tonnes of shale oil.
