= Gornje Selo, Bosnia and Herzegovina =

Gornje Selo Горње Село
- Village
- Location within Bosnia and Herzegovina
- Coordinates: 44.3702258°N 18.1175924°E
- Country: Bosnia and Herzegovina
- Entity: Federation of Bosnia and Herzegovina
- Canton: Zenica-Doboj
- Municipality: Zavidovići

Area
  - Total: 0.15 sq mi (0.39 km^{2})

Population (2013)
  - Total: 70
  - Density: 460/sq mi (180/km^{2})
- Time zone: UTC+1 (CET)
  - Summer (DST): UTC+2 (CEST)

Gornje Selo is a village in the municipality of Zavidovići, Bosnia and Herzegovina.

== Demographics ==
According to the 2013 census, its population was 70.

Ethnicity in 2013
Ethnicity	Number	Percentage
Bosniaks	67	95.7%
other/undeclared	3	4.3%
Total	70	100%
