= Ljutići, Montenegro =

Ljutići
- Village
- Location within Montenegro
- Country: Montenegro
- Municipality: Pljevlja

Population (2011)
  - Total: 113
- Time zone: UTC+1 (CET)
  - Summer (DST): UTC+2 (CEST)

Ljutići (Serbian Cyrillic: Љутићи) is a village in the municipality of Pljevlja, Montenegro.

== Demographics ==
According to the 2003 census, the village had a population of 167 people.

According to the 2011 census, its population was 113.

Ethnicity in 2011
Ethnicity	Number	Percentage
Serbs	88	77.9%
Montenegrins	23	20.4%
other/undeclared	2	1.8%
Total	113	100%
