= Mrčevo, Croatia =

Mrčevo
- Village
- Interactive map of Mrčevo
- Location within Croatia
- Coordinates: 42.74°N 17.98°E
- Country: Croatia
- County: Dubrovnik-Neretva County
- Municipality: Dubrovnik

Area
  - Total: 2.5 sq mi (6.6 km^{2})

Population (2021)
  - Total: 76
  - Density: 30/sq mi (12/km^{2})
- Time zone: UTC+1 (CET)
  - Summer (DST): UTC+2 (CEST)

Mrčevo is a village in Croatia.

== Demographics ==
According to the 2021 census, its population was 76.
