= Moćevići, Pljevlja =

Moćevići
- Village
- Location within Montenegro
- Country: Montenegro
- Municipality: Pljevlja

Population (2003)
  - Total: 11
- Time zone: UTC+1 (CET)
  - Summer (DST): UTC+2 (CEST)

Moćevići (Serbian Cyrillic: Моћевићи) is a small hamlet in the municipality of Pljevlja, Montenegro. It is located at the Bosnian border.

== Demographics ==
According to the 2003 census, the village had a population of 11 people.
