= Planjsko, Montenegro =

Planjsko
- Village
- Location within Montenegro
- Country: Montenegro
- Municipality: Pljevlja

Population (2011)
  - Total: 7
- Time zone: UTC+1 (CET)
  - Summer (DST): UTC+2 (CEST)

Planjsko (Serbian Cyrillic: Плањско) is a small hamlet in the municipality of Pljevlja, Montenegro. It is located close to the Bosnian border.

== Demographics ==
According to the 2003 census, the village had a population of 15 people.

According to the 2011 census, its population was 7, all Serbs.
