= Kukavica, Pljevlja =

Kukavica Кукавица
- Village
- Location within Montenegro
- Country: Montenegro
- Municipality: Pljevlja

Population (2011)
  - Total: 10
- Time zone: UTC+1 (CET)
  - Summer (DST): UTC+2 (CEST)

Kukavica (Serbian Cyrillic: Кукавица) is a village in the municipality of Pljevlja, Montenegro.

== Demographics ==
According to the 2003 census, the village had a population of 13 people.

According to the 2011 census, its population was 10.
