= Vidre, Pljevlja =

Vidre
- Village
- Location within Montenegro
- Country: Montenegro
- Municipality: Pljevlja

Population (2011)
  - Total: 182
- Time zone: UTC+1 (CET)
  - Summer (DST): UTC+2 (CEST)

Vidre (Serbian Cyrillic: Видре) is a village in the municipality of Pljevlja, Montenegro.

== Demographics ==
According to the 2003 census, the village had a population of 127 people.

According to the 2011 census, its population was 182.

Ethnicity in 2011
Ethnicity	Number	Percentage
Serbs	133	73.1%
Montenegrins	43	23.6%
other/undeclared	6	3.3%
Total	182	100%
