= Vijenac, Montenegro =

Vijenac Вијенац
- Village
- Location within Montenegro
- Country: Montenegro
- Municipality: Pljevlja

Population (2011)
  - Total: 246
- Time zone: UTC+1 (CET)
  - Summer (DST): UTC+2 (CEST)

Vijenac (Serbian Cyrillic: Вијенац) is a village in the municipality of Pljevlja, Montenegro.

== Demographics ==
According to the 2003 census, the village had a population of 262 people.

According to the 2011 census, its population was 246.

Ethnicity in 2011
Ethnicity	Number	Percentage
Serbs	175	71.1%
Montenegrins	62	25.2%
other/undeclared	9	3.7%
Total	246	100%
