= Milakovići, Montenegro =

Milakovići Милаковићи
- Village
- Location within Montenegro
- Country: Montenegro
- Municipality: Pljevlja

Population (2011)
  - Total: 42
- Time zone: UTC+1 (CET)
  - Summer (DST): UTC+2 (CEST)

Milakovići (Serbian Cyrillic: Милаковићи) is a small village in the municipality of Pljevlja, Montenegro.

== Demographics ==
According to the 2003 census, the village had a population of 33 people.

According to the 2011 census, its population was 42.

Ethnicity in 2011
Ethnicity	Number	Percentage
Serbs	34	81.0%
Montenegrins	6	14.3%
other/undeclared	2	4.8%
Total	42	100%
