= Gradac, Pljevlja =

Gradac Градац
- Town
- Location within Montenegro
- Coordinates: 43°23′40″N 19°9′14″E
- Country: Montenegro
- Municipality: Pljevlja

Population (2011)
  - Total: 296
- Time zone: UTC+1 (CET)
  - Summer (DST): UTC+22 (CEST)

Gradac (Serbian Cyrillic: Градац) is a small town in the Pljevlja Municipality of northern Montenegro. It is Montenegro's northernmost settlement with town status and is located in the Sandžak region close to the borders with Bosnia and Herzegovina and Serbia. Gradac is located along the road to the northwest of the town of Pljevlja; Flysch-like rocks are said to be "exposed in the area of Gradac village, on the Pljevlja-Gradac road".

== Demographics ==
According to the 2003 census, the village had a population of 364 people.

According to the 2011 census, its population was 296.

Ethnicity in 2011
Ethnicity	Number	Percentage
Serbs	165	55.7%
Montenegrins	58	19.6%
Bosniaks	14	4.7%
other/undeclared	59	19.9%
Total	296	100%

== Economy ==
Wood processing and lead and zinc mining is conducted in the region, and Gradac has flotation facilities. The town has the dumpsite of the lead and zinc mine "Suplja stijena".
