= Gornje Selo, Montenegro =

Gornje Selo Горње Село
- Village
- Location within Montenegro
- Country: Montenegro
- Municipality: Pljevlja

Population (2011)
  - Total: 76
- Time zone: UTC+1 (CET)
  - Summer (DST): UTC+2 (CEST)

Gornje Selo (Serbian Cyrillic: Горње Село) is a small village in the municipality of Pljevlja, Montenegro.

== Demographics ==
According to the 2003 census, the village had a population of 40 people.

According to the 2011 census, its population was 76.

Ethnicity in 2011
Ethnicity	Number	Percentage
Serbs	62	81.6%
Montenegrins	13	17.1%
other/undeclared	1	1.3%
Total	76	100%
