= Mijakovići, Vareš =

Village in Vareš, Bosnia and Herzegovina

Mijakovići Мијаковићи
- Village
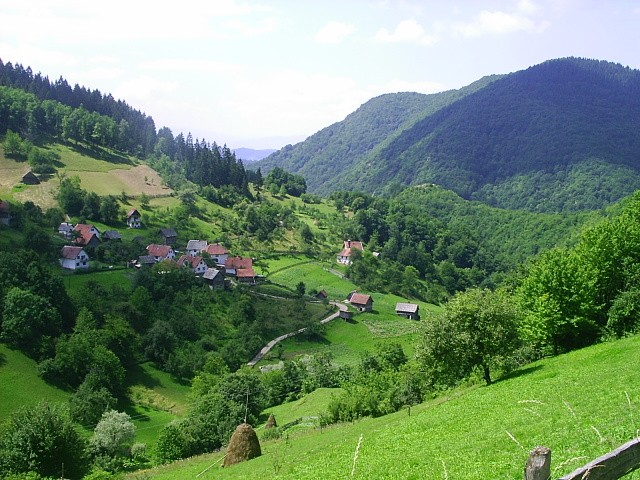

- Location within Bosnia and Herzegovina
- Coordinates: 44.1427199°N 18.2525108°E
- Country: Bosnia and Herzegovina
- Entity: Federation of Bosnia and Herzegovina
- Canton: Zenica-Doboj
- Municipality: Vareš

Area
  - Total: 3.51 sq mi (9.08 km^{2})

Population (2013)
  - Total: 161
  - Density: 45.9/sq mi (17.7/km^{2})
- Time zone: UTC+1 (CET)
  - Summer (DST): UTC+2 (CEST)

Mijakovići is a village in the municipality of Vareš, Bosnia and Herzegovina.

== Demographics ==
According to the 2013 census, its population was 161.

Ethnicity in 2013
Ethnicity	Number	Percentage
Bosniaks	160	99.4%
other/undeclared	1	0.6%
Total	161	100%
