= Orlja, Pljevlja =

Orlja
- Village
- Location within Montenegro
- Country: Montenegro
- Region: Northern
- Municipality: Pljevlja

Population (2011)
  - Total: 80
- Time zone: UTC+1 (CET)
  - Summer (DST): UTC+2 (CEST)

Orlja (Montenegrin Cyrillic: Орља) is a small village in the municipality of Pljevlja, Montenegro.

== Demographics ==
According to the 2003 census, the village had a population of 96 people.

According to the 2011 census, its population was 80.

Ethnicity in 2011
| Ethnicity | Number | Percentage |
|---|---|---|
| Serbs | 48 | 60.0% |
| Montenegrins | 23 | 28.8% |
| other/undeclared | 9 | 11.3% |
| Total | 80 | 100% |
