= Pljevlja Municipality =

Municipality of Montenegro

Pljevlja Municipality Opština Pljevlja Општина Пљевља
- Municipality
- Flag Coat of arms

- Pljevlja Municipality in Montenegro
- Coordinates: 43.3500°N 19.3500°E
- Country: Montenegro
- Seat: Pljevlja

Area
  - Total: 1,346 km^{2} (520 sq mi)

Population (2011 Census)
  - Total: 30,786
  - Density: 22.87/km^{2} (59.24/sq mi)
- Time zone: UTC+1
  - Summer (DST): UTC+2 (CEST)
- Area code: +382 52
- ISO 3166-2 code: ME-14
- Car plates: PV
- Climate: Cfb
- Website: http://www.pljevlja.me/

Pljevlja Municipality is located in Northern Montenegro. It covers an area of 1,346 km² and had a population of 30,786 at the 2011 census.

== Geography and location ==
The highest point of the municipality is on the Ljubišnja mountain at an altitude of 2,238 m (7,343 ft), while the lowest point is in the canyon of the Tara river with an altitude of 529 m (1,736 ft) above sea level. The municipality borders the municipalities of: Žabljak, Bijelo Polje and Mojkovac in Montenegro, as well as the countries of Serbia and Bosnia and Herzegovina. With a total area of 1,346 km^{2} (520 sq mi), it is the third largest municipality in Montenegro.

== Demographics ==
The town of Pljevlja is the administrative center of the Pljevlja municipality, which has a population of 35,806. The town of Pljevlja itself has 19,136 residents, and is the only town in the municipality with a population of over 1,000. The municipality has a Serb majority. According to the 2011 census, the population consisted of: Serbs (60.11%), Montenegrins (21.52%), Muslims (8.14%) and Bosniaks (5.21%).

== Settlements ==
- Aliži
- Beljkovići
- Bjeloševina
- Bobovo
- Boljanići
- Borišići
- Borova
- Borovica
- Boščinovići
- Brda, Pljevlja
- Bujaci
- Bušnje
- Čardak
- Čavanj
- Čerjenci
- Cerovci
- Čestin
- Crljenice
- Crni Vrh, Pljevlja
- Crno Brdo
- Crnobori
- Donja Brvenica
- Dragaši, Pljevlja
- Dubac
- Dubočica
- Dubrava, Pljevlja
- Đuli
- Đurđevića Tara
- Durutovići
- Dužice
- Geuši
- Glibaći
- Glisnica
- Gornja Brvenica
- Gornje Selo
- Gotovuša
- Gradac, Pljevlja
- Gradina, Pljevlja
- Grevo
- Horevina
- Hoćevina
- Jabuka, Pljevlja
- Jagodni Do
- Jahovići
- Jasen
- Jugovo
- Kakmuži
- Kalušići
- Katun, Pljevlja
- Klakorina
- Kolijevka
- Komine
- Kordovina
- Kosanica
- Kotlajići
- Kotline
- Kotorac
- Kovačevići
- Kovači, Pljevlja
- Kozica, Pljevlja
- Košare
- Krupice
- Kruševo, Pljevlja
- Krćevina
- Kržava
- Kukavica, Pljevlja
- Lađana
- Leovo Brdo
- Lever Tara
- Lijeska, Pljevlja
- Ljutići
- Ljuće
- Lugovi, Pljevlja
- Madžari
- Male Krće
- Maoče
- Mataruge
- Meljak
- Metaljka
- Mijakovići
- Milakovići
- Milunići
- Mironići
- Moraice
- Moćevići
- Mrzovići
- Mrčevo
- Mrčići
- Nange
- Obarde
- Odžak
- Ograđenica
- Orlja, Pljevlja
- Otilovići
- Pauče
- Petine
- Pižure
- Plakala
- Planjsko
- Pliješ
- Pliješevina
- Poblaće
- Podborova
- Popov Do
- Potkovač
- Potkrajci, Pljevlja
- Potoci, Pljevlja
- Potpeće, Pljevlja
- Potrlica
- Pračica
- Prehari
- Premćani
- Prisoji
- Prošće
- Pušanjski Do
- Rabitlje
- Rađevići
- Romac
- Rudnica, Pljevlja
- Rujevica, Pljevlja
- Selac
- Selišta, Pljevlja
- Sirčići
- Slatina, Pljevlja
- Šljivansko, Pljevlja
- Šljuke
- Srećanje
- Stančani
- Strahov Do
- Šula
- Šumani
- Tatarovina
- Trnovice
- Tvrdakovići
- Uremovići
- Varine
- Vaškovo
- Velike Krće
- Vidre, Pljevlja
- Vijenac
- Vilići
- Višnjica
- Vodno
- Vojtina
- Vrba, Pljevlja
- Vrbica, Pljevlja
- Vrulja
- Zabrđe, Pljevlja
- Zaselje, Pljevlja
- Zbljevo
- Zekavice
- Zenica, Pljevlja
- Židovići
- Zorlovići

=== City Assembly (2022–2026) ===
Party/Coalition	Seats	Local Gov't.
ZBCG (NSD–DNP)	12 / 34	Yes
DPS	8 / 34	No
DCG	4 / 34	Yes
PES	4 / 34	Yes
Pokret za Pljevlja	2 / 34	Yes
SNP	1 / 34	Yes
URA	1 / 34	No
SEP	1 / 34	No
BS	1 / 34	No

== Gallery ==
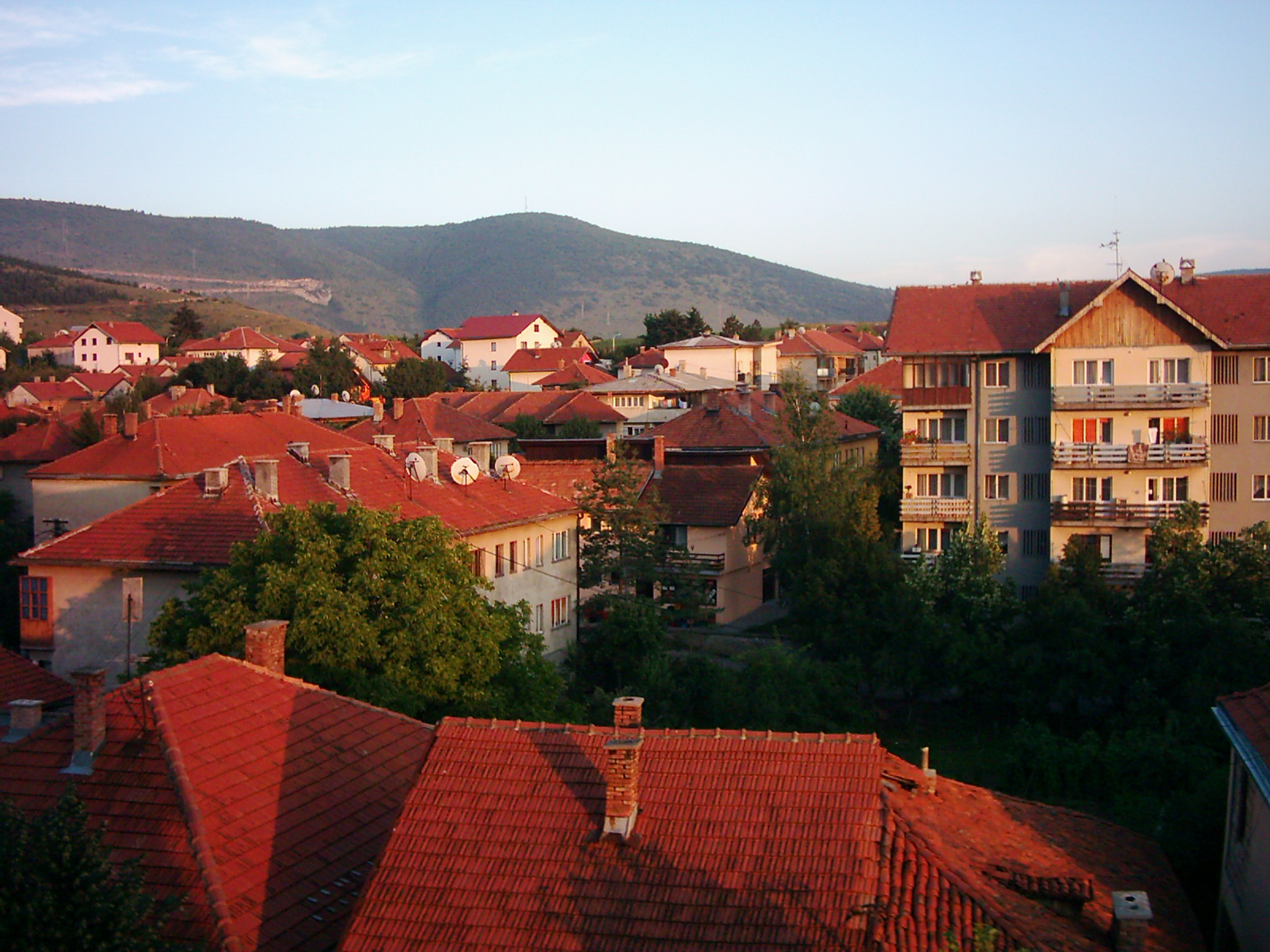
Town of Pljevlja

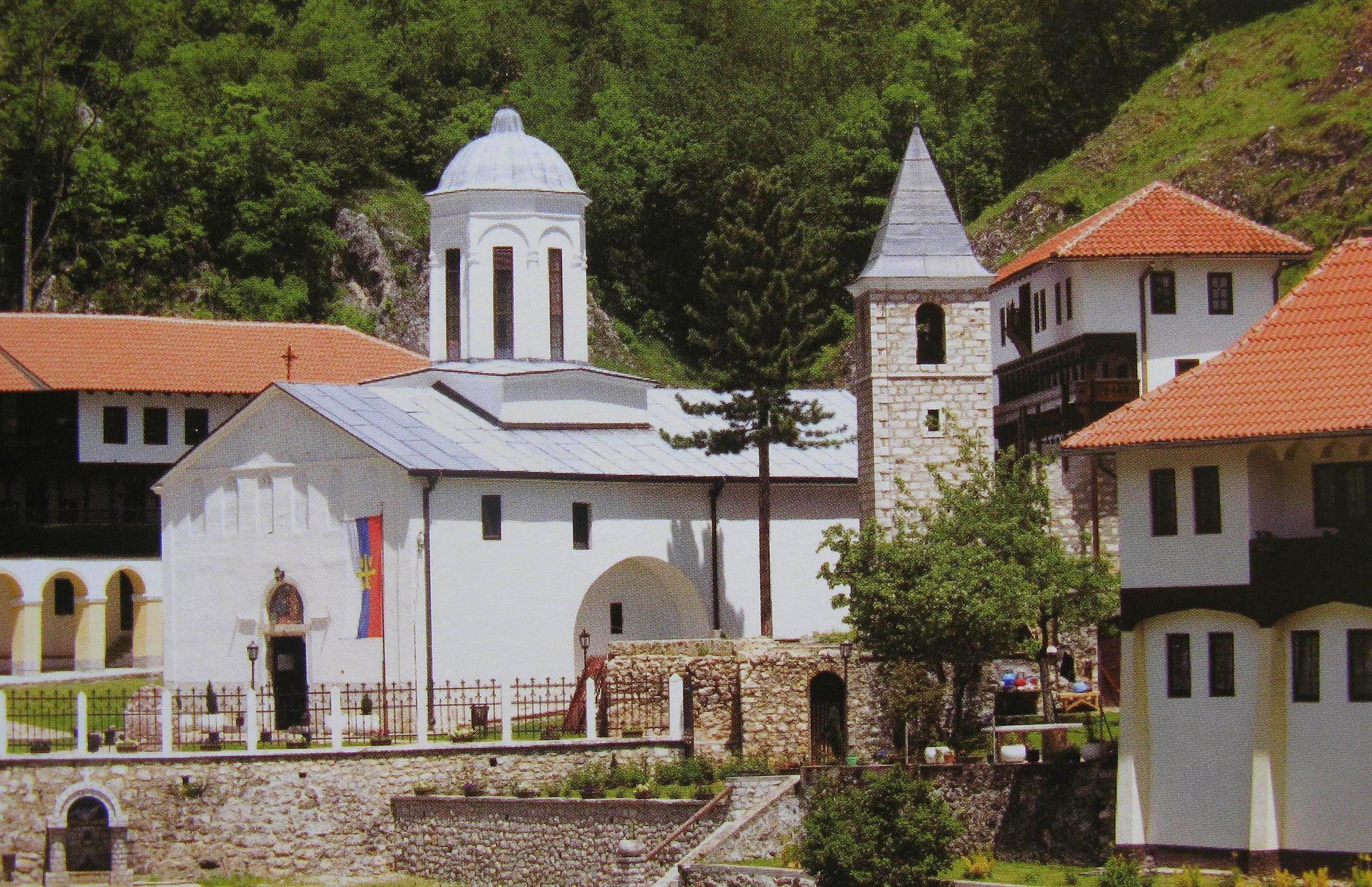
Holy Trinity Monastery

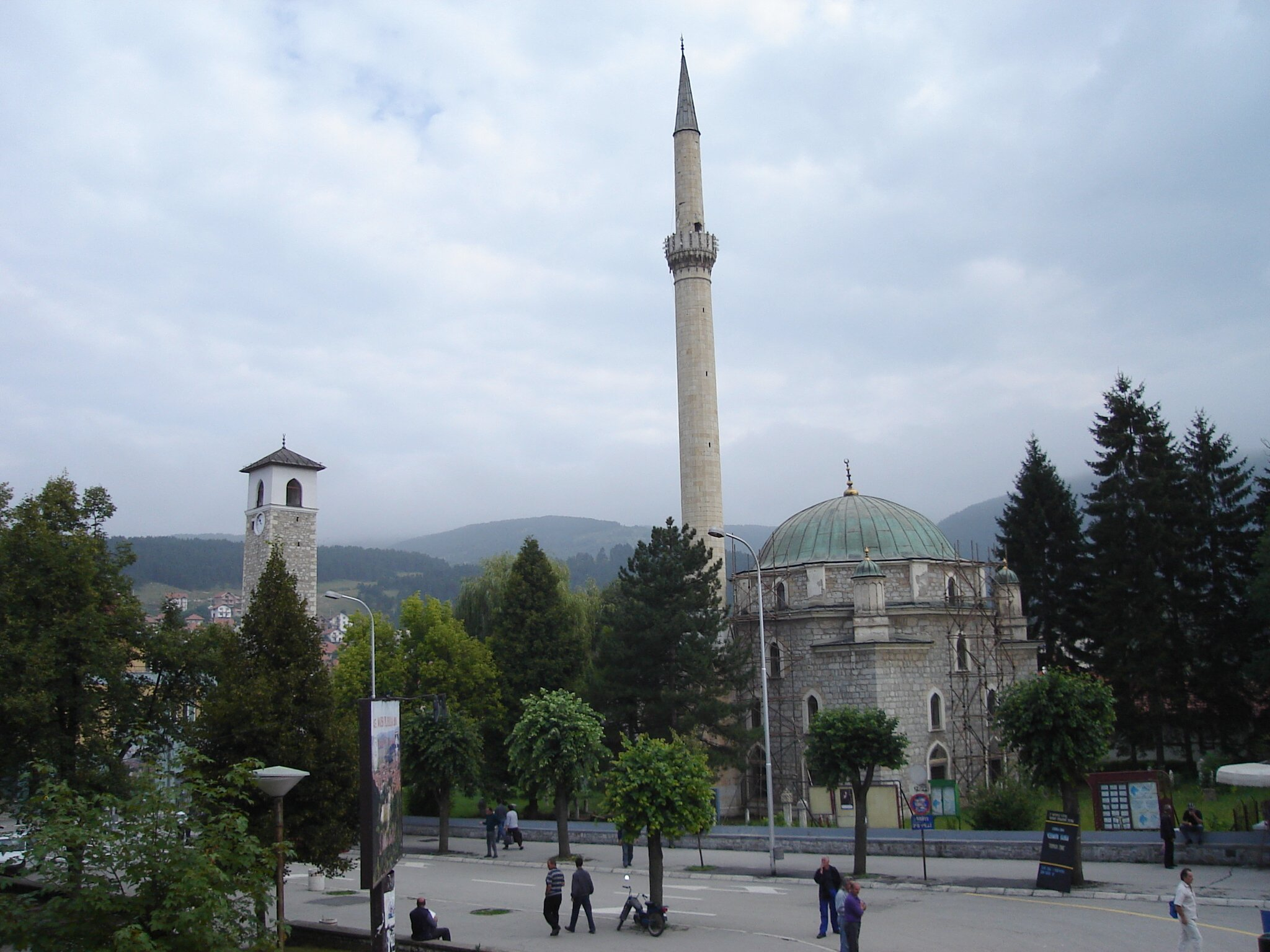
Husein-paša's Mosque

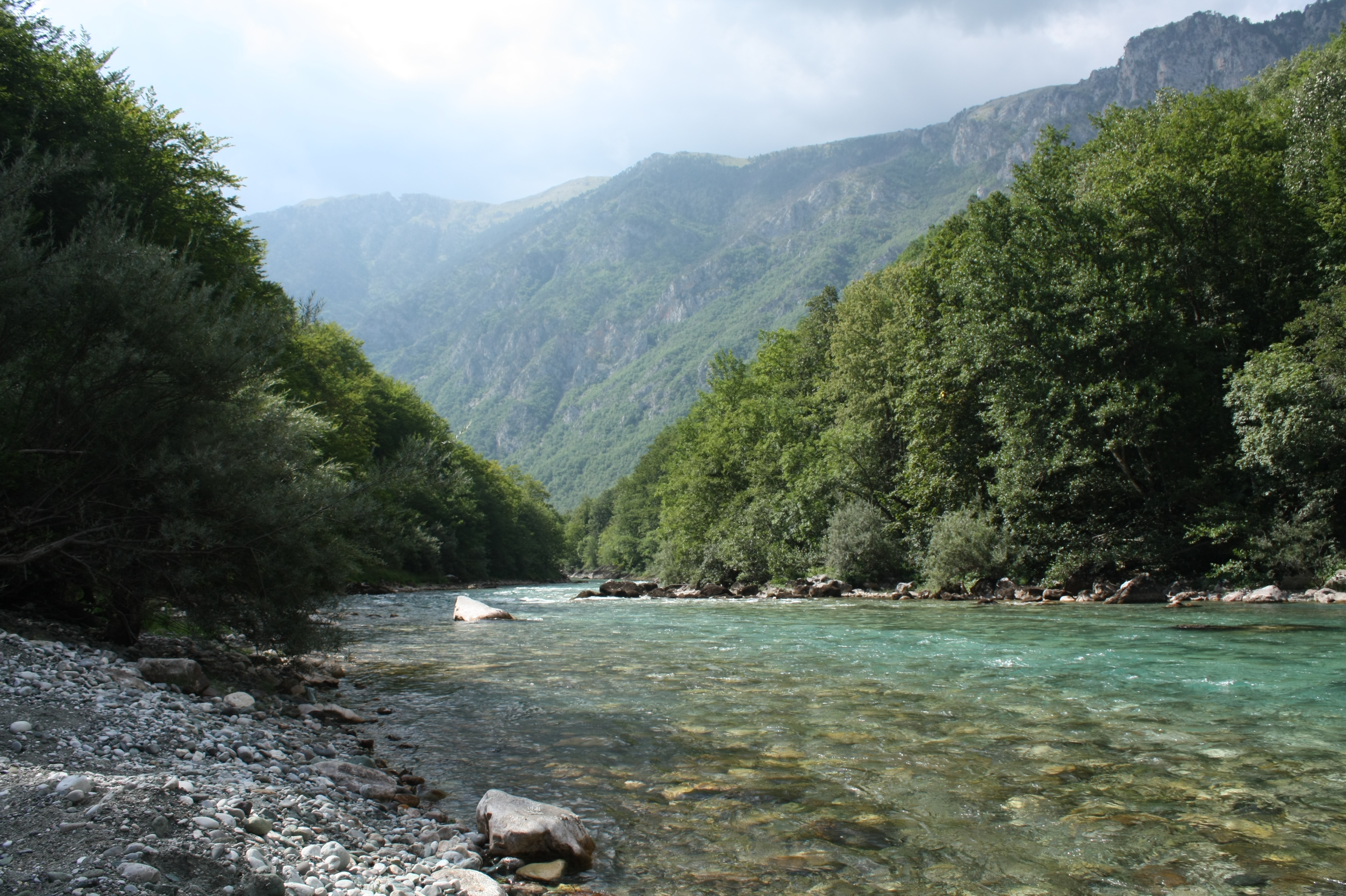
Tara river

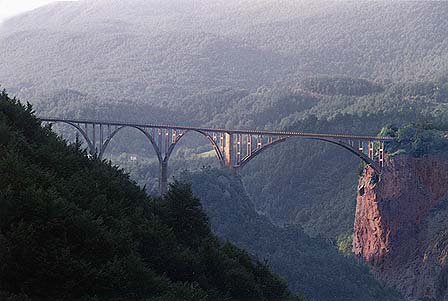
Đurđevića Tara Bridge

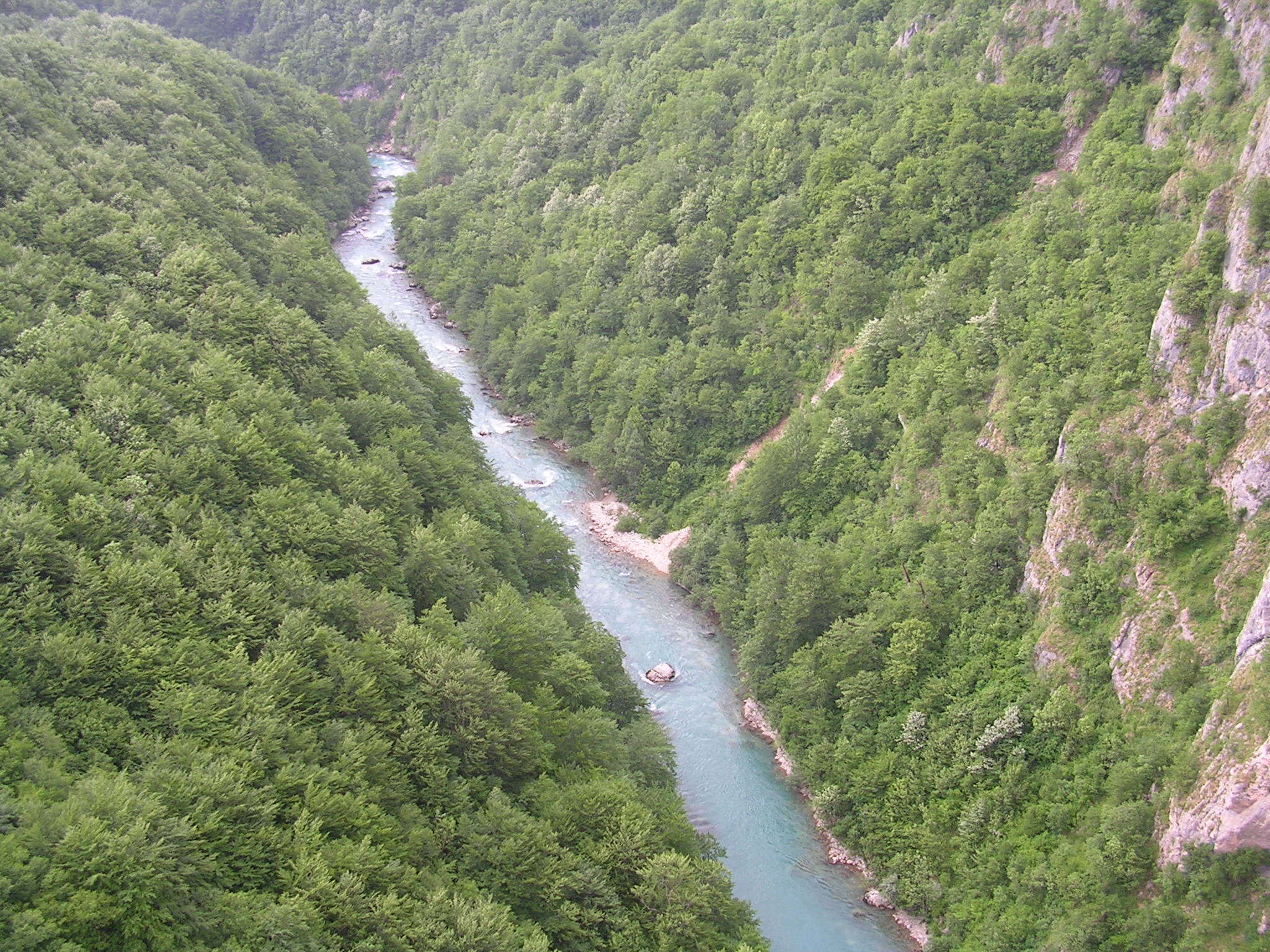
Tara River Canyon

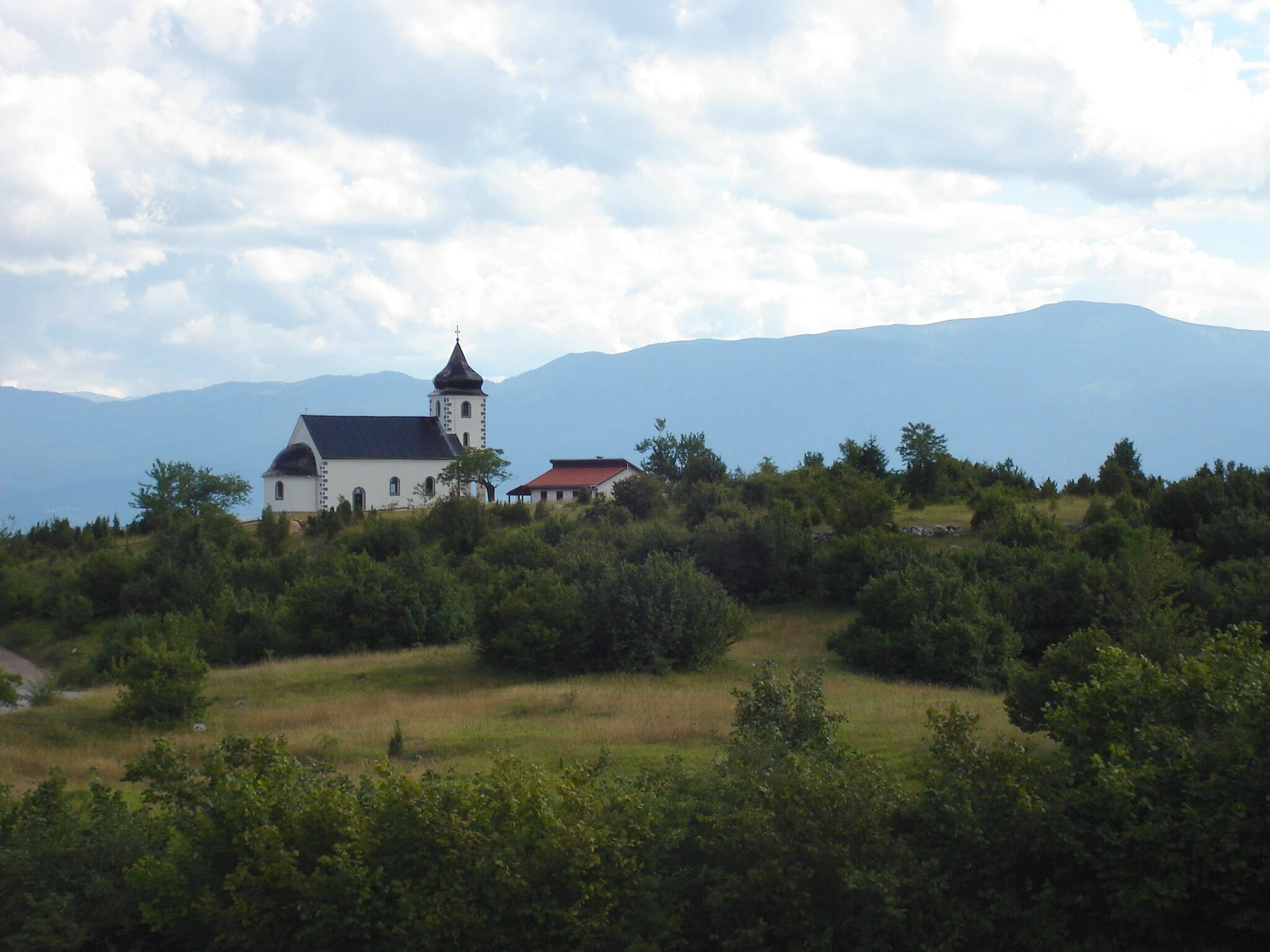
Church near Pljevlja

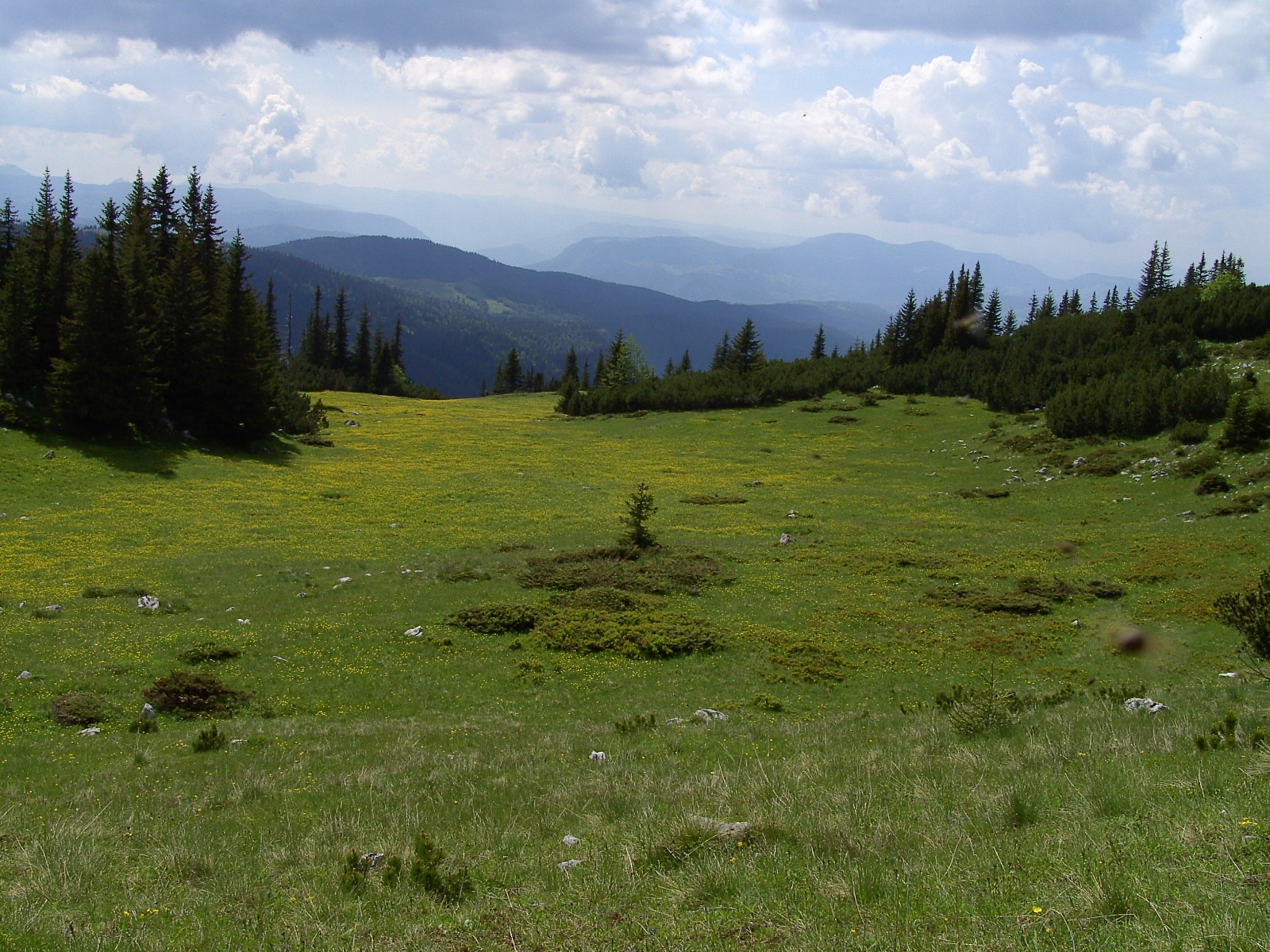
Ljubišnja
