= Košare, Montenegro =

Košare Кошаре
- Village
- Location within Montenegro
- Country: Montenegro
- Municipality: Pljevlja

Population (2011)
  - Total: 47
- Time zone: UTC+1 (CET)
  - Summer (DST): UTC+2 (CEST)

Košare (Serbian Cyrillic: Кошаре) is a small village in the municipality of Pljevlja, Montenegro.

== Demographics ==
According to the 2003 census, the village had a population of 83 people.

According to the 2011 census, its population was 47.

Ethnicity in 2011
| Ethnicity | Number | Percentage |
|---|---|---|
| Serbs | 35 | 74.5% |
| Montenegrins | 11 | 23.4% |
| other/undeclared | 1 | 2.1% |
| Total | 165 | 100% |
