= Mrčevo, Montenegro =

Mrčevo Мрчево
- Village
- Location within Montenegro
- Country: Montenegro
- Municipality: Pljevlja

Population (2003)
  - Total: 16
- Time zone: UTC+1 (CET)
  - Summer (DST): UTC+2 (CEST)

Mrčevo (Serbian Cyrillic: Мрчево) is a small village in the municipality of Pljevlja, Montenegro.

== Demographics ==
According to the 2003 census, the village had a population of 16 people.
