= Maoče =

- Village
- Location within Montenegro
- Country: Montenegro
- Municipality: Pljevlja

Population (2011)
  - Total: 86
- Time zone: UTC+1 (CET)
  - Summer (DST): UTC+2 (CEST)

Maoče (Serbian Cyrillic: Маоче) is a village in the municipality of Pljevlja, Montenegro.

== Demographics ==
According to the 2003 census, the village had a population of 112 people.

According to the 2011 census, its population was 86.

Ethnicity in 2011
Ethnicity	Number	Percentage
Serbs	52	60.5%
Montenegrins	20	23.3%
other/undeclared	14	16.3%
Total	86	100%
