= Potarje, Montenegro =

Coordinates: 43°0′9.8″N 19°26′24.5″E

Potarje (Montenegrin and Serbian Cyrillic: Потарје) is a region in northern Montenegro. It includes the Tara River valleys and the Tara River Canyon.

== Geography ==
- Mojkovac municipality
- Crna Poda forest

== History ==
=== Middle Ages ===
Several settlements in the region were mentioned in the Ston charter (1253) of Stefan Uroš I, the King of Serbia, and in the later Lim charter. One of these was Brskovo, an important town in medieval Serbia.

=== Modern ===
In the time of the Cretan War (1645–69), Potarje and the neighbouring territories were in revolt against the Ottoman Empire.

The Dobrilovina Monastery became the "centre of the spiritual and political life and aspirations for freedom in the wide area of Potarje", after 1866, when archimandrite Mihailo Dožić-Medenica (1848-1914) was sent as an administrator. Dožić also having established a school that was operated secretly in the monastery, the first school in the valley of Tara — this was a very significant step towards national awakening in this region and surrounding regions. Dožić organized an insurgent battalion in the region, active between 1875 and 1878 (during the Herzegovina Uprising (1875–78) and Montenegrin–Ottoman War (1876–78)).

In the Principality of Montenegro, Šaranci was part of the Nikšić nahija.

== Monuments ==
- Dobrilovina Monastery, built in the Raška architectural school, is located on the left Tara river banks, at the beginning of the Tara River Canyon.
