= Dobrilovina Monastery =

Serbian Orthodox monastery near Mojkovac, Montenegro

Monastery of St. George, Dobrilovina
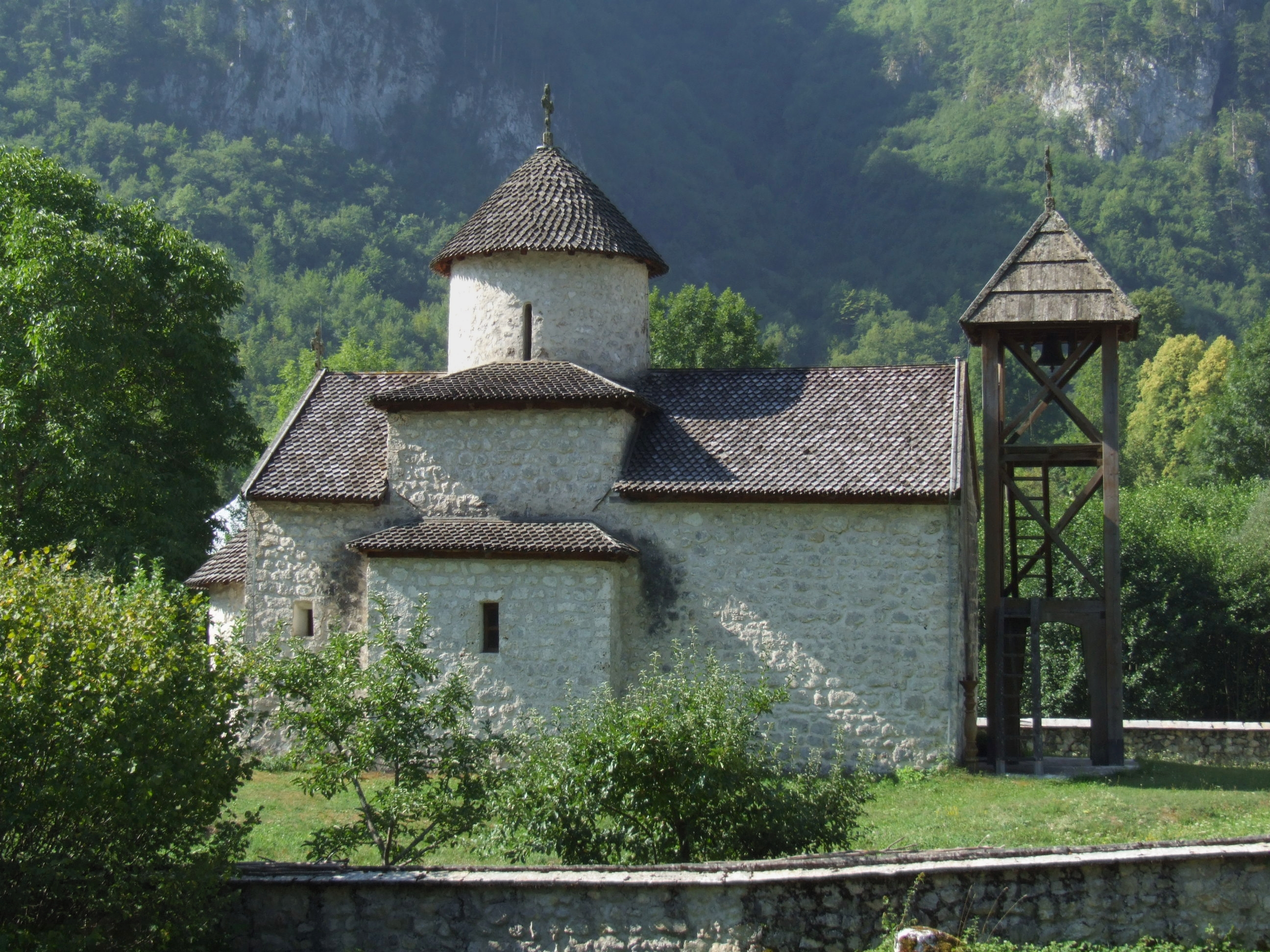

- Location within Montenegro

Religion
- Affiliation: Serbian Orthodox Church
- Region: Potarje, Tara River Canyon
- Rite: Byzantine Rite
- Year consecrated: Before 1592; again in 1594
- Status: Active

Location
- Location: Mojkovac, Montenegro
- Interactive map of Monastery of St. George, Dobrilovina
- Territory: Eparchy of Budimlja and Nikšić
- Coordinates: 43.0278°N 19.4008°E

Architecture
- Style: Raška school
- Completed: 1609 (on an earlier foundation)
- Materials: Stone, wood

The Dobrilovina Monastery (Serbian: Манастир Добриловина, romanized: Manastir Dobrilovina) is a Serbian Orthodox monastery in Donja Dobrilovina, Mojkovac, northern Montenegro. It is located on the left Tara river banks, in a region known as Potarje, at the beginning of the Tara River Canyon, the deepest river canyon in Europe. The village of Dobrihnina (later Dobrilovina) was mentioned in a Nemanjić charter in 1253, though the oldest preserved mention of the monastery dates back to 1592, when the Ottoman authorities allowed the locals to rebuild their monastery in Dobrilovina. In 1609, the current standing church dedicated to St. George was finished; the frescoes were finished by 1613. This church has been pillaged, abandoned, destroyed and renovated several times since its founding.

== Geography ==
The monastery is located on the left Tara river banks, in a region known as Potarje, at the beginning of the Tara River Canyon, which is the deepest river canyon in Europe. The monastery lies within the historical tribal region of Šaranci, which includes the whole of Potarje. The monastery is the only one left in this region. It lies near the Crna Poda forest.

== Architecture ==
The monastery was built in the Raška architectural school. In terms of architectural and spatial traits, there is resemblance between the Uvac Monastery, Church of the Annunciation Monastery in Ovčar Banja, Pustinja Monastery, Dobrilovina Monastery, Majstorovina Monastery, Tronoša Monastery and others. The monastery is single-naved and has a rectangular apse shape, and low choir chapels at the side, appearing as transepts on the ground plan.

== History ==
In the Ston charter (1253) of Stefan Uroš I, the King of Serbia, the villages "Brskovo, Prostenija, Stričina, Gostilovina, Bistrica, and the hamlets of Dobrihnina (later Dobrilovina) and Bjelojevina" are mentioned, and these exist still today, all in the Mojkovac municipality. In the later Lim charter, the "village Brskovja Prostjanja and hamlets: Bistrica, Dobrihnina, Gostilovina, Stričina, Plavkovina, Selca, Jasenovo" are mentioned, the three last are unidentified though are most likely to have been hamlets of the earlier mentioned villages. The name changed over time into Dobrilovina.

The oldest existing sources mentioning the monastery date from 1592, when the Ottoman Empire issued a ferman (decree) approving the locals' reconstruction of a destroyed church in the grounds. The reconstruction indicates that the monastery existed earlier, though it is not known when the original monastery was built. According to tradition, there was an older temple (храм) at the site, big as the Morača monastery (which was built in 1252), and the fact that Dobrilovina is reminiscent of Morača, it is called Little Morača (Мала Морача). Some believe that Dobrilovina too was an endowment of the Nemanjić dynasty.

The consecration of the church took place in 1594, when hegumen Janićije and duhovnik Zarija are mentioned. A Theotokarion (Богородичник) was written in the monastery, dating to 1602; this manuscript was later held at Cetinje, from where it was taken to Russia. The church, dedicated to Saint George, was finished in 1609 as an endowment of hegumen Joakim and the monastic brotherhood, which is attested by the inscription above the doorway to the nave. This was thanks to vojvoda (duke) Radič Milošević and the local knezovi (lords). Painting of the church frescoes was finished by the year 1613. In the time of the Cretan War (1645–69), Potarje and the neighbouring territories were in revolt against the Ottoman Empire. In 1664, a menaion was written at the monastery. In 1673, the valuables of the Ravna Reka monastery (Majstorovina) were transferred to the Dobrilovina monastery. These valuables, including books and church utensils, among which were an ancient panagia, were later transferred to the Nikoljac Monastery in Bijelo Polje. In 1689, a cell was built. Some time after 1699, the relics of Archbishop Arsenije I were moved to the monastery from the Dovolja Monastery. In 1749 the church got a roof, and the monastery was reactivated. The monastery was then ravaged by the Ottomans in 1799, however the monks had already retrieved the valuables and abandoned it. S. Kosanović (Serbian Learned Society, 1871) wrote that "... 58 years ago [ca. 1813] the church was destroyed when Omer Akn, an evildoer, came with two others and terrorized and extorted the hegumen." The monastery was then restored by hieromonk Makarije of Vraćevšnica, with the help of Jovan Savić and priest Vid, in 1833. However, the same year, Turks from Kolašin attacked the monastery and "dispersed the [monastic] brotherhood", and the church was renovated only in 1866, when archimandrite Mihailo Dožić-Medenica (1848-1914) was sent as an administrator.

It became the "centre of the spiritual and political life and aspirations for freedom in the wide area of Potarje", Dožić also established a school that was operated secretly in the monastery, the first school in the valley of Tara — this was a very significant step towards national awakening here and in surrounding regions. The school was temporarily moved to the nearby cave during Ottoman attacks. Dožić also organized an insurgent battalion in the region, active between 1875 and 1878 (during the Montenegrin–Ottoman War (1876–78)). The Ottomans had the monastery emptied and the quarters burned in 1877.

The monastery was renovated in 1905. After the First Balkan War, the region was liberated and became part of the Kingdom of Montenegro. During World War I, the Montenegrin army heavily defeated the numerically stronger Austro-Hungarian army in the Battle of Mojkovac.

== Gallery ==
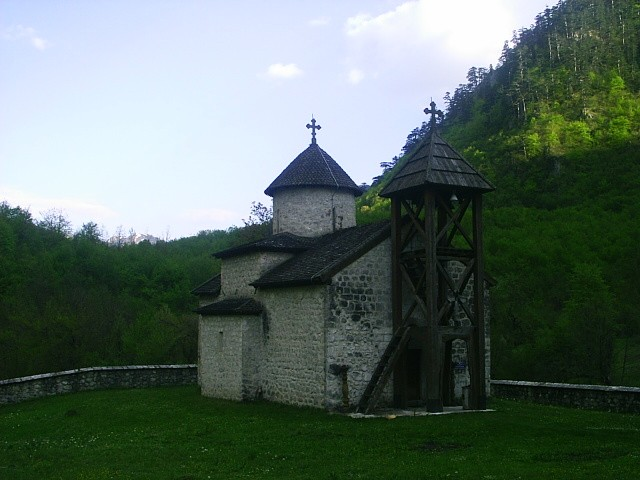
Dobrilovina

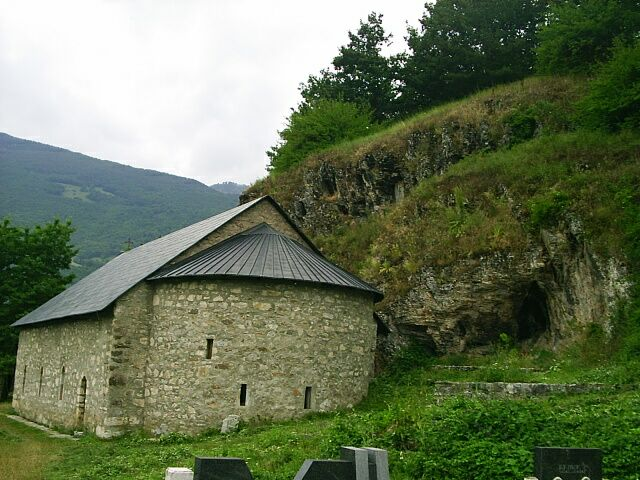
Dobrilovina

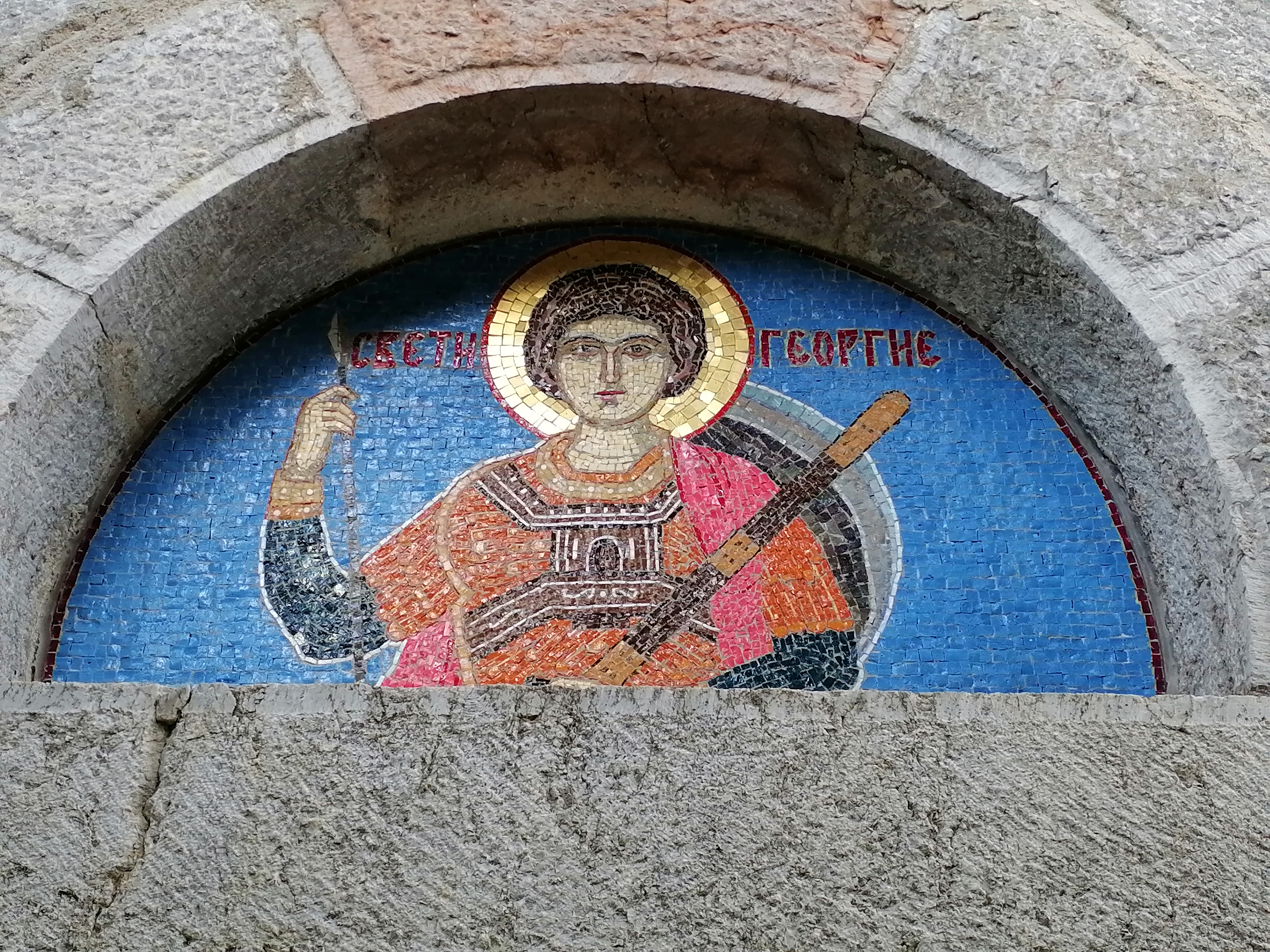

== See also ==
- List of Serbian Orthodox monasteries
