= Tara (župa) =

Tara (Serbian Cyrillic: Тара) was a župa (county) of the medieval Serbian state, including the valley of the Tara river (now in northern Montenegro). It included area on both sides of the river, where the valley becomes steeper and more rugged. The county included the settlement of Premćani. The toponym, of non-Slavic etymology, was possibly mentioned since the 12th century, surely since the mid-13th century. The mining town of Brskovo was nearby. The monastery of Dovolja in Premćani is believed to have been built by Serbian king Stefan Milutin (r. 1282–1321) in the late 13th century. The Kriči tribe presumably inhabited the county.

== Sources ==
- Dedijer, Jevto (1913). "Nova Srbija". Izdanja (154). Srpska književna zadruga: 286–287.
- Petrović, Mihailo (1941). Đerdapski ribolovi u prošlosti i u sadašnjosti. Vol. 4. Izd. Zadužbine Mikh. R. Radivojeviča. p. 257.
