= Tronoša Monastery =

Monastery in Serbia

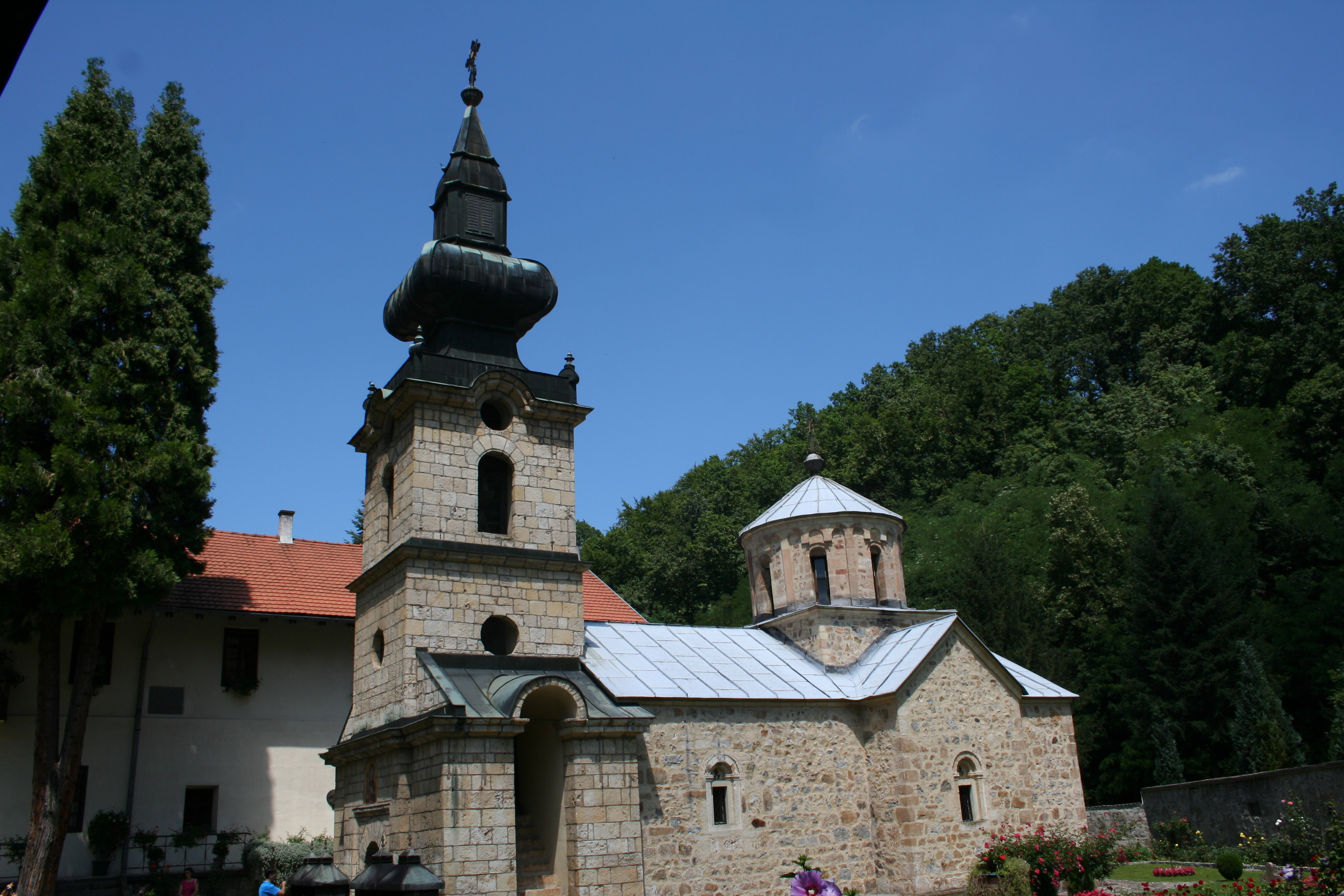
- Tronoša
- Interactive map of Tronoša Monastery

Monastery information
- Full name: Манастир Троноша
- Order: Serbian Orthodox
- Established: 1317
- Diocese: Eparchy of Šabac

Site
- Location: Tršić and Korenita, Serbia
- Coordinates: 44°27′37″N 19°17′01″E
- Public access: Yes

The Tronoša Monastery (Serbian: Манастир Троноша / Manastir Tronoša) is a Serbian Orthodox monastery between the villages of Tršić and Korenita, in the administrative territory of city of Loznica, in western Serbia. It is ecclesiastically part of the Eparchy of Šabac. According to tradition, the monastery was built by King Stefan Dragutin.

== Location ==
The monastery is located 17 km (11 mi) southeast of Loznica. It is situated in the forested area of the Korenita village. However, being also close to the village of Tršić and as the first school of a linguist and language reformer Vuk Stefanović Karadžić who was also from Tršić, the monastery is popularly connected to this village.

== History ==
=== Old monastery ===
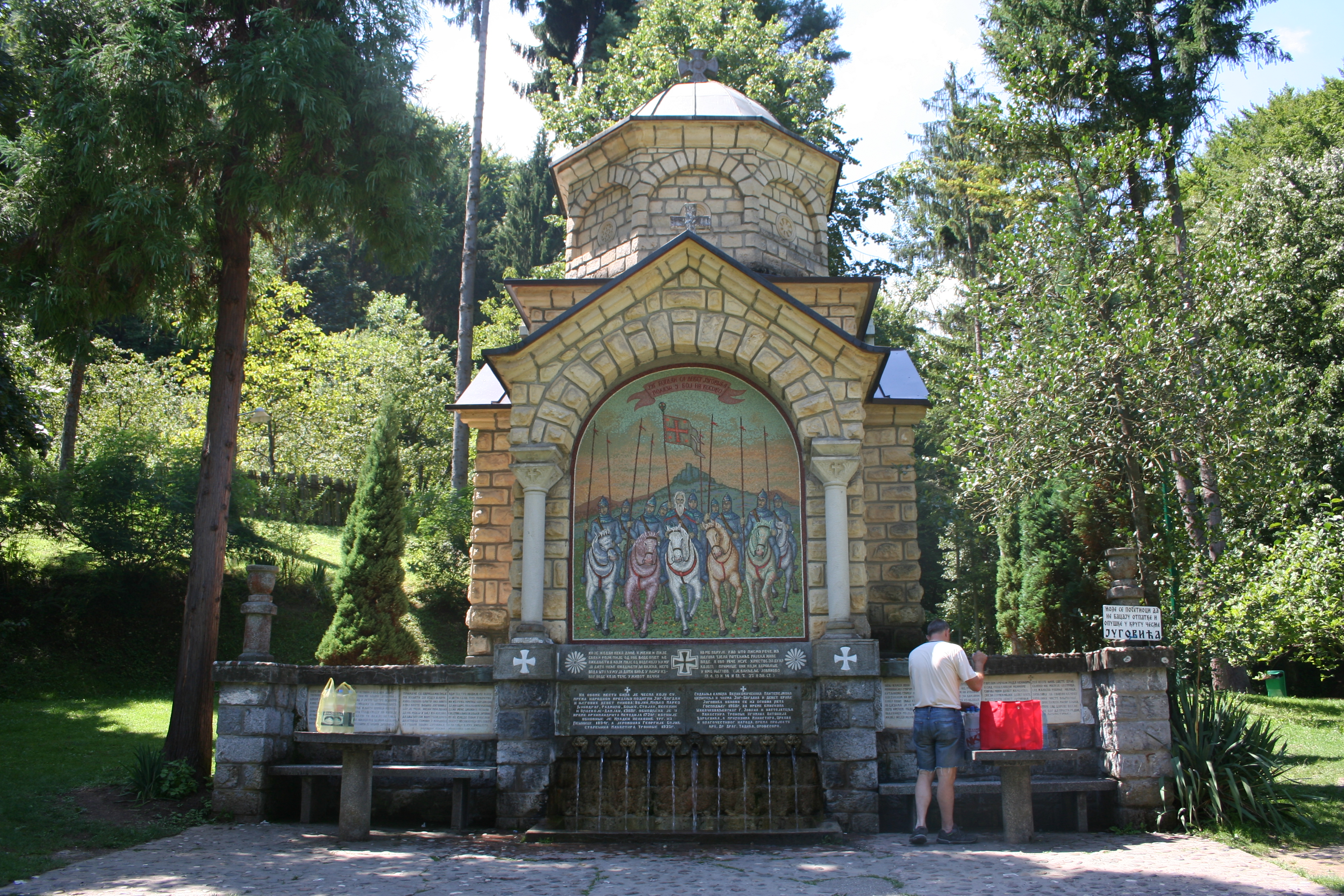
Jugović brothers' fountain

There are no proper historical records which confirm the origin of the monastery and everything known about it is according to the various traditional writings. The monastery was an endowment of King Stefan Dragutin. However, he died in 1316 and the construction was finished by his widow, Queen Catherine in 1317. It was named after three rivers which confluence into one at the monastery (tri reke koje vodu nose, "three water bearing rivers"). The original edifice was looted and razed by the Ottoman Empire several times in the 14th and 15th centuries. It ended up being completely demolished and it is not known what the original monastery looked like.

=== Reconstruction ===
It was rebuilt on the foundations of the old monastery in 1559. The enterprise was headed by the hegumen Pajsije and monks Arsenije and Genadije. That same year, the Church of the Presentation of Mary was built. Just few years later, a school which transcribed and rewrote the old manuscripts was operational. As an act of retaliation for the attacks of the hajduks in the region, the Ottomans burned it in the early 1800s. It was renovated in 1834 and was painted by Mihailo Konstantinović from Bitola and Nikola Janković from Ohrid.

In 1791, a hieromonk Josif Tronošac transcribed the 1526 Tronoša Chronicle, the most important Serbian literary memorial in the first half of the 18th century. The copy of the chronicle is kept in the monastery, while the original is in Vienna.

=== World wars ===
Tronoša was badly damaged during the World War I. During the Battle of Cer in 1914, Serbian wounded soldiers were transported to the monastery for medical treatments. After Austria-Hungary occupied Serbia, their army burned the church books. The also destroyed or removed all doors in the complex, which were repaired only in 1923. In August 1941, a local Chetnik rebellion liberated Loznica ("the first town liberated from Germans in the occupied Europe") in the Battle of Loznica, and Tronoša's hegumen Georgije Bojić was active in the planning and conducting of the operation. as an aide to Veselin Misita, in charge of the attack. When German reoccupied the area in October 1941 they burned the monastery books and punched through one of the walls with the cannonball.

=== Contemporary period ===
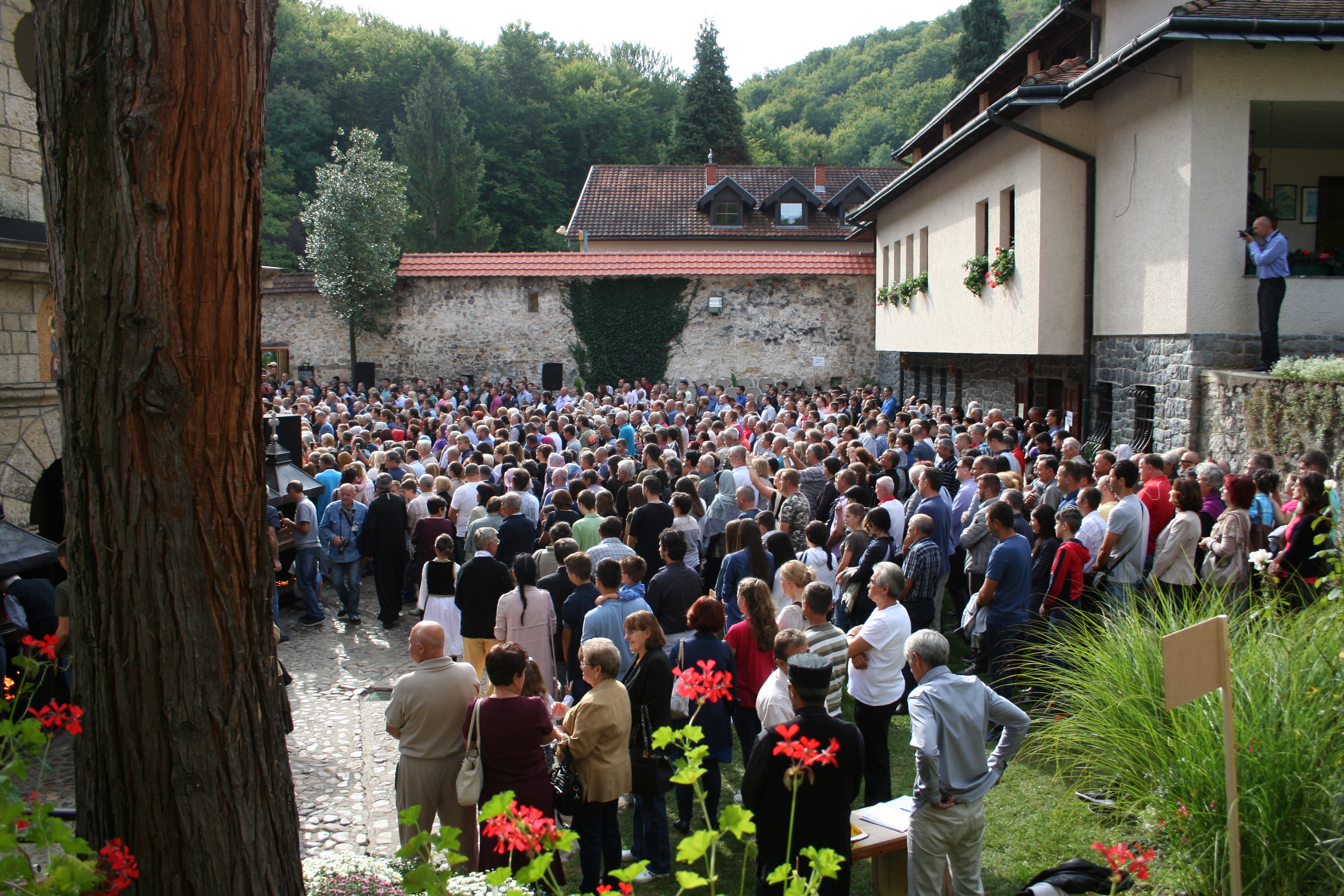
The 700th anniversary of the establishment of the monastery (2017)

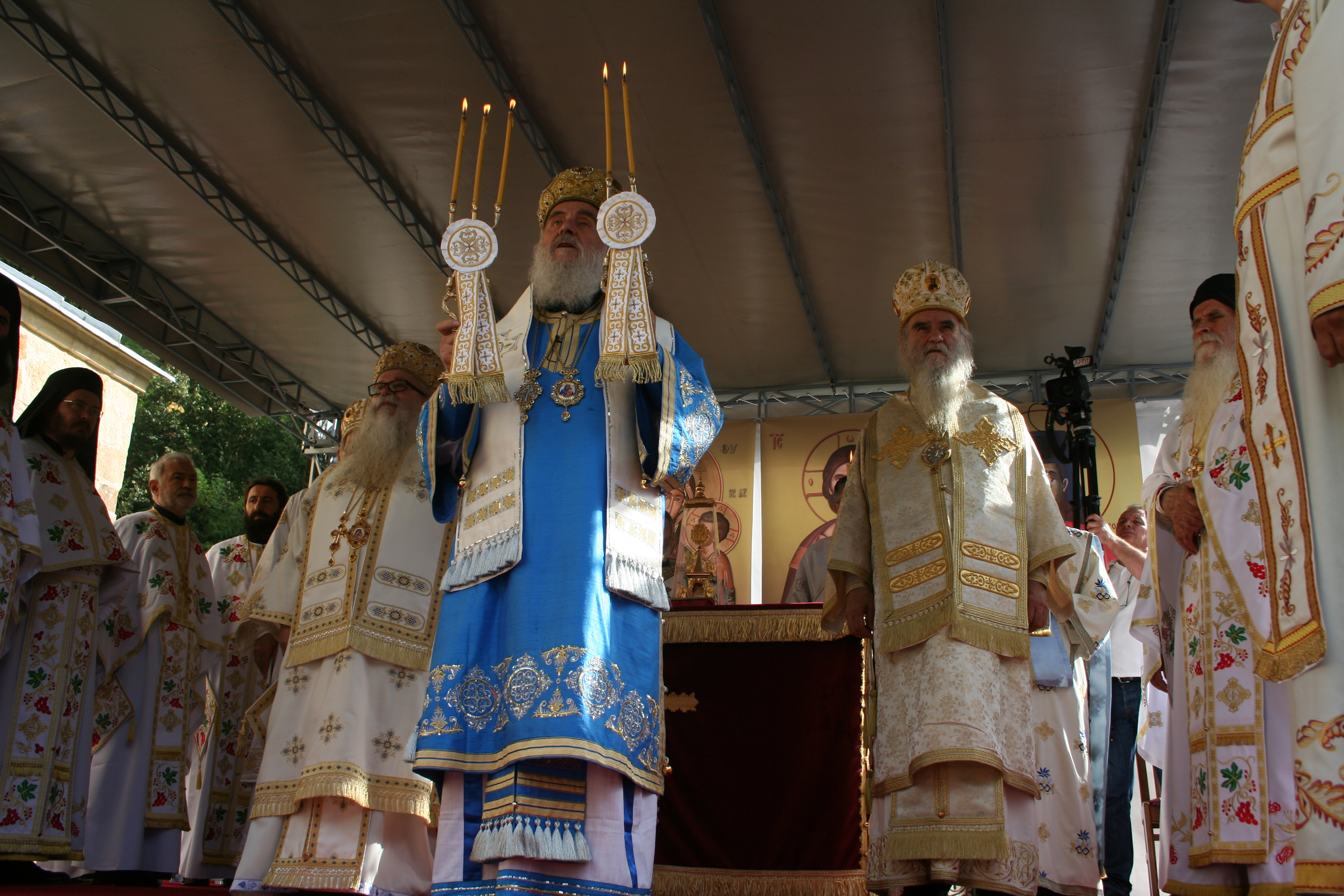
Hrizostom, Metropolitan of Dabar-Bosna (left), Irinej, Serbian Patriarch (center), and Amfilohije, Metropolitan of Montenegro and the Littoral (right), at the 700th anniversary

In the vicinity of the monastery is the Chapel of the Saint Holy Martyr Pantaleon. Below the chapel is the ten-pipe concrete drinking fountain with cold, spring water. Both the chapel and the fountain were also destroyed several times through history. Traditionally, the original fountain is attributed to the mythological Jug Bogdan (based on the historical Vratko Nemanjić, though) and his nine sons, the Jugović brothers, hence the ten pipes. They built the chapel and the fountain in 1388 prior to the Battle of Kosovo. Modern chapel and the fountain were restored in 1968 when the fresco "Leaving to the Battle of Kosovo" was painted on the fountain. The fountain is called "The Fountain of the Nine Jugović".

One of the best known traditions in the monastery is the making of large "plowmen candles". Two are cast each year out of 50 kg (110 lb) of wax and are 1.5 m (4 ft 11 in) tall. On the Maundy Thursday people gather in front of the monastery, bring the candles inside the church and light them in front of the icons of Jesus Christ and the Holy Mother of God. They are thought to help to preserve and enhance the harvest, hence the name. The custom of casting the candles and the ceremony of bringing them into the church and lighting them has been placed on the Serbian list of the intangible cultural heritage.

As Vuk Stefanović Karadžić learned to write in the monastery, "coming to school from the nearby Tršić through the forest", a section of the monastery is adapted into the "Museum of the Vuk's early schooling". Today, Tronoša is a female monastery. In 2017 it officially celebrated 700th anniversary.

The monastery has been protected since 22 December 1948 and was declared a cultural monument of great importance in 1979.

== Architecture ==
The monastery was built in the Raška architectural school. In terms of architectural and spatial traits, there is resemblance between the Uvac Monastery, Church of the Annunciation Monastery in Ovčar Banja, Pustinja Monastery, Dobrilovina Monastery, Majstorovina Monastery, Tronoša Monastery and others.

== Saint Stefan of Tronoša ==
Archimandrite Stefan Jovanović was born in the nearby village of Tekeriš, on the Cer. He was a noted spiritual leader, patriot, rebel and the first teacher of Vuk Stefanović Karadžić. He was especially active against the Turkification ("thanks to him, none of the Serbs east of the Drina river were Turkified"). When the famine struck the regions of Jadar and Rađevina, he came to the local Turks to ask for the help for the hungry people, but the Turks poisoned him. In 2017 Serbian Orthodox Church canonized him as the Venerable Stefan of Tronoša. Its day is 17 September and it is the official slava of the Eparchy of Šabac.

== See also ==
- List of Serbian Orthodox monasteries
