= Dožić =

Dožić (Serbian Cyrillic: Дoжић) is a Montenegrin surname. In the Morača region of Montenegro there is a brotherhood called Dožić-Medenica (Дожић-Меденица). Notable people with the surname include:

- Gavrilo Dožić, Patriarch of the Serbs, as Gavrilo V (s. 1938–1950)
- Mihailo Dožić, Orthodox hierodeacon and archimandrite
- Sekula Dožić
- Milovan Dožić
- Savo Dožić
- Milo Dožić, President of the Parliament of Montenegro (1 December 1910 – 12 February 1911)
- Darko Dožić
