= Majstorovina Monastery =

Serbian Orthodox monastery near Bijelo Polje, Montenegro

Coordinates: 42.96190°N 19.72207°E

The Majstorovina Monastery (Serbian: Манастир Мајсторовина, romanized: Manastir Majstorovina) is a Serbian Orthodox monastery located in the village of Majstorovina in Bijelo Polje, Montenegro. It includes the Church of the Holy Trinity, dating back to the reign of Vukan Nemanjić. It was abandoned in the 17th century, its documents having been relocated to the Dobrilovina Monastery and the Nikoljac Monastery.

In terms of architectural and spatial traits, there is resemblance between the Uvac Monastery, Church of the Annunciation Monastery in Ovčar Banja, Pustinja Monastery, Dobrilovina Monastery, Majstorovina Monastery, Tronoša Monastery and others.

It includes the Church of the Holy Trinity, dating back to the reign of Vukan Nemanjić. In 1673, the valuables of the Ravna Reka monastery (Majstorovina) were transferred to the Dobrilovina monastery. These valuables, including books and church utensils, among which were an ancient panagia, were later transferred to the Nikoljac Monastery in Bijelo Polje.

== See also ==
- List of Serbian Orthodox monasteries
