= Pustinja Monastery =

Serbian Orthodox monastery in Central Serbia

Pustinja monastery
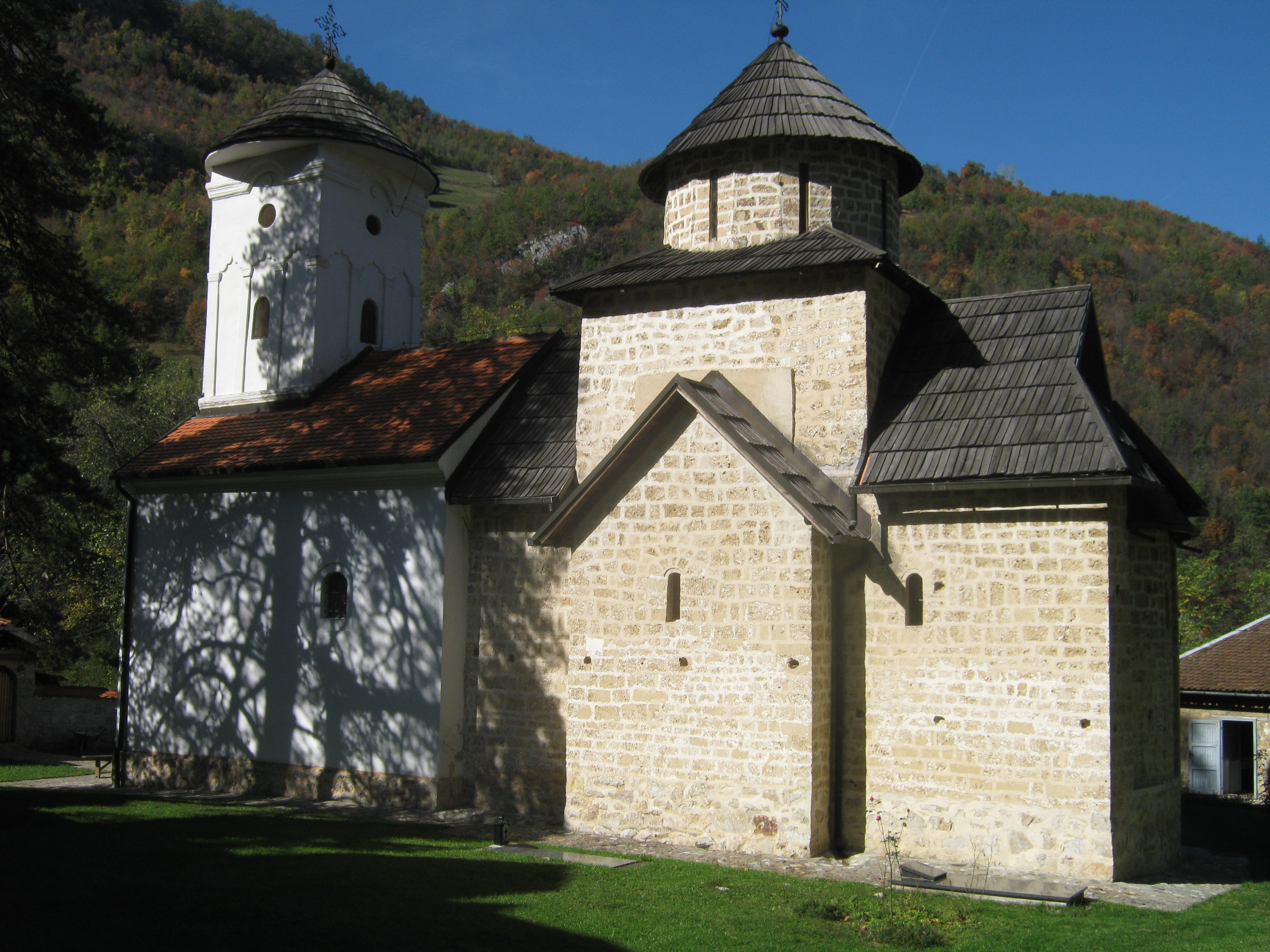
- Pustinja Monastery

- Location within Serbia
- Interactive map of Pustinja monastery

Monastery information
- Other name: Манастир Пустиња
- Dedication: Presentation of Mary

Site
- Location: village Poćuta near Valjevo in Central Serbia
- Coordinates: 44°11′47″N 19°43′36″E
- Public access: yes

Pustinja Monastery (Serbian: Манастир Пустиња, romanized: Manastir Pustinja) is a Serbian Orthodox monastery in village of Poćuta near Valjevo in Central Serbia.

According to local legends this monastery was built in the 13th century by King Saint Stefan Dragutin. Scientific researches found that the monastery was actually built in 1622 on the remnants of the older monastery which was built in the 11th century. The construction of the monastery was completed on 25 June 1622.

== Architecture ==
The monastery was built in the Raška architectural school. In terms of architectural and spatial traits, there is resemblance between the Uvac Monastery, Church of the Annunciation Monastery in Ovčar Banja, Pustinja Monastery, Dobrilovina Monastery, Majstorovina Monastery, Tronoša Monastery and others.

== See also ==
- List of Serb Orthodox monasteries
