= Uvac Monastery =

Monastery in western Serbia

Coordinates: 43.6121°N 19.5882°E

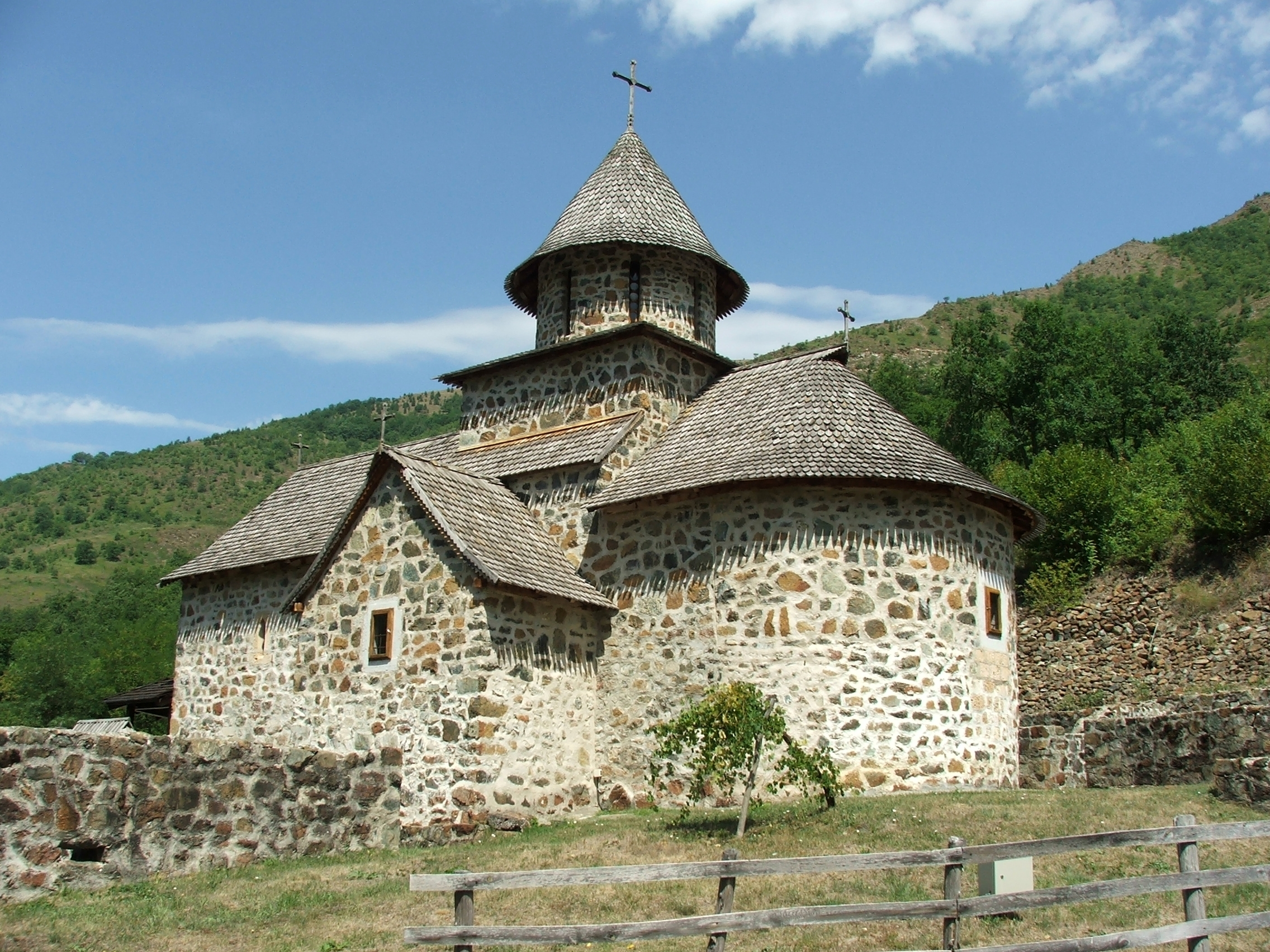

- Location within Serbia

Religion
- Affiliation: Serbian Orthodox Christianity
- Region: Zlatibor
- Rite: Byzantine Rite
- Year consecrated: 12th or 13th century
- Status: active

Location
- Location: Serbia
- Interactive map of Uvac Monastery
- Territory: Eparchy of Žiča

Architecture
- Style: Raška school
- Materials: stone, wood

The Uvac Monastery (Serbian: Манастир Увац) is a Serbian Orthodox monastery in western Serbia.

== Architecture ==
The monastery was built in the Raška architectural school. In terms of architectural and spatial traits, there is resemblance between the Uvac Monastery, Morača Monastery, Church of the Annunciation Monastery in Ovčar Banja, Pustinja Monastery, Dobrilovina Monastery, Majstorovina Monastery, Tronoša Monastery and others.

== See also ==
- List of Serbian Orthodox monasteries
