= Đurđevića Tara Bridge =

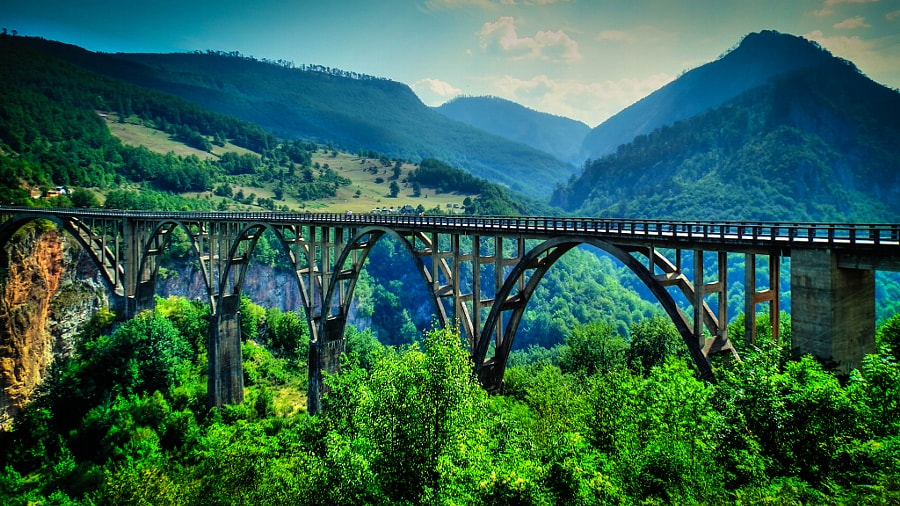
- Coordinates: 43°09′02″N 19°17′43″E
- Carries: cars, pedestrians
- Crosses: the Tara River
- Locale: close to Žabljak, Montenegro

Characteristics
- Design: arch bridge
- Total length: 365 m
- Longest span: 116 m
- Clearance below: 170 m

History
- Opened: 1940

The Đurđevića Tara Bridge (Cyrillic: Мост на Ђурђевића Тари, pronounced [dʑǔːrdʑɛv̞iːtɕaː târa]) is a concrete arch bridge over the Tara River in northern Montenegro.

== Location ==
It is located at the crossroads between the municipalities of Mojkovac, Pljevlja and Žabljak. The exact location of the bridge is between the villages of Budečevica and Trešnjica.

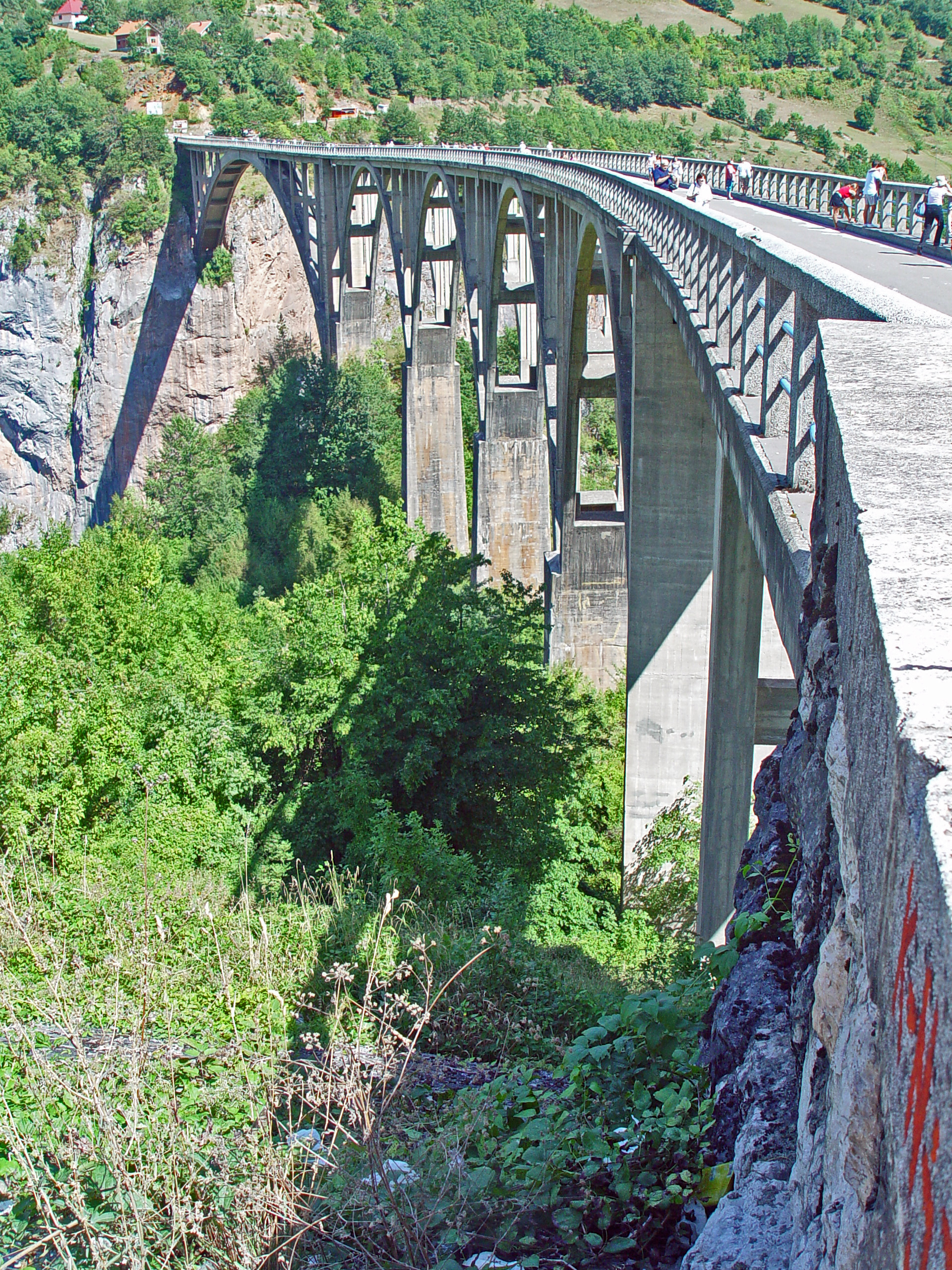
Tara bridge

== Construction ==
The Đurđevića Tara Bridge, which was designed by engineer Mijat Trojanović, was built between 1937 and 1940 in the Kingdom of Yugoslavia, and the works were carried out by the company Andonović from Belgrade. The project's Chief Engineer was Isaac Russo.

The 365-metre-long (1,198 ft) bridge has five arches; the largest span is 116 metres (381 ft). The roadway stands 172 metres (564 ft) above the Tara River. At the time of its completion, it was the biggest vehicular concrete arch bridge in Europe.

== World War II ==
Much of Montenegro, including the Tara Canyon, came under Italian occupation following the German-led Invasion of Yugoslavia in April 1941. As the mountainous terrain made it suitable for guerrilla warfare, a partisan uprising occurred in the area. Italian forces took control of the Tara Bridge during an Italian offensive in 1942.

A Yugoslav Partisan raiding party blew up the southwesternmost arch with the aid of one of the bridge engineers, Lazar Jauković. The attack cut the only feasible crossing over the Tara Canyon halting the Italian advance. When Jauković was eventually captured, however, the Italians executed him on the bridge.

These events were depicted in the 1969 Yugoslav film Most (English title The Bridge).

== Present day ==
The bridge was rebuilt in 1946. It was used in the 1978 British action film Force 10 from Navarone set during World War II. In more recent years bungee jumping has taken place from the longest arch directly above the river.

The bridge also plays a large part in the Dutch novel Het land achter Gods rug by A. den Doolaard, which was published in 1956. This novel is partly based on the true story of the bridge including its destruction by partisans during World War II.
