= Premćani =

Premćani Премћани
- Village
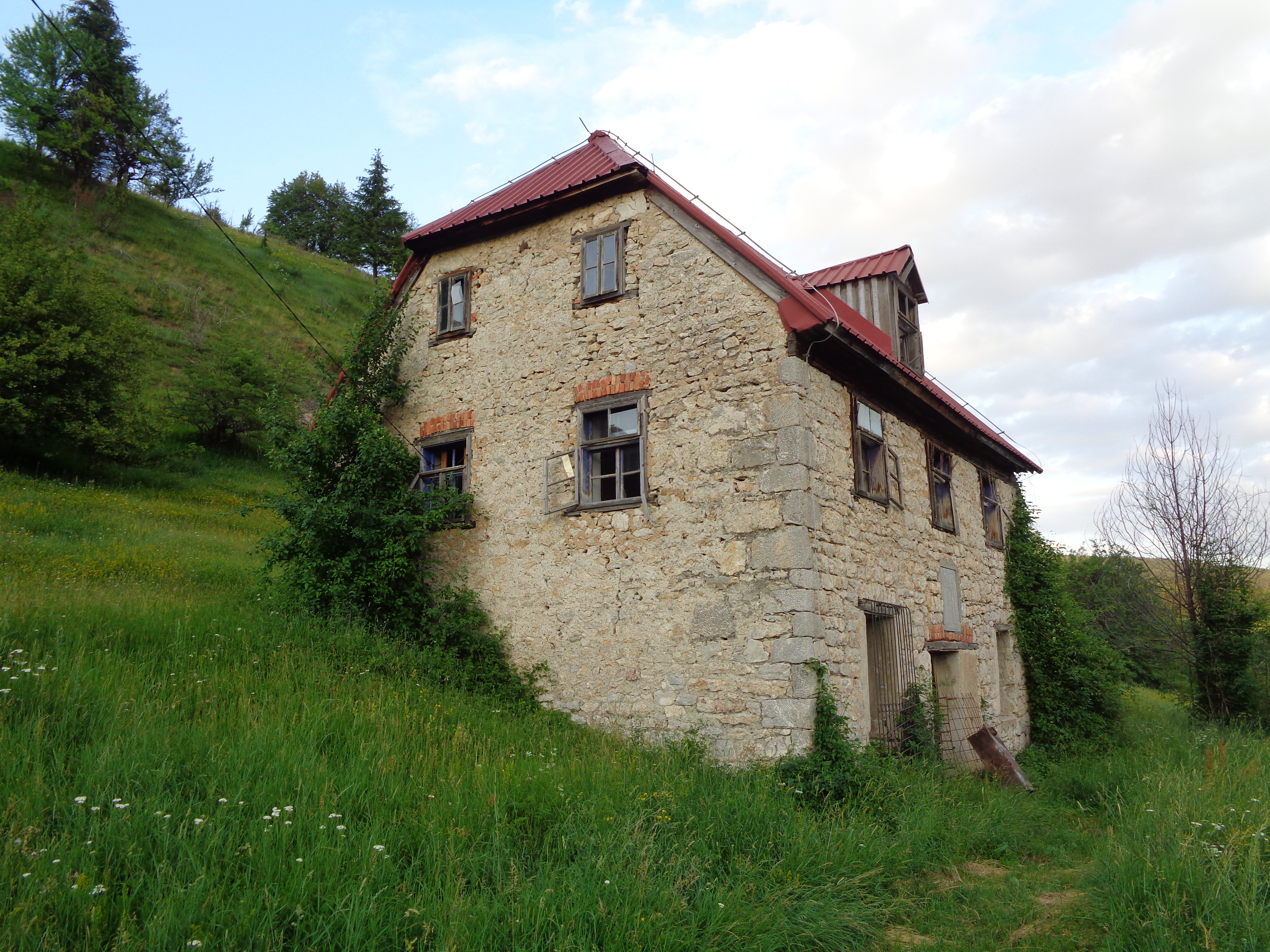

- Location within Montenegro
- Country: Montenegro
- Municipality: Pljevlja

Population (2011)
  - Total: 49
- Time zone: UTC+1 (CET)
  - Summer (DST): UTC+2 (CEST)

Premćani (Serbian Cyrillic: Премћани) is a small village in the municipality of Pljevlja, Montenegro. The village, a medieval site, was part of the medieval county of Tara. The monastery of Dovolja is located in the village.

== Demographics ==
According to the 2003 census, the village had a population of 73 people (50,68% Montenegrins and 46,57% Serbs).

According to the 2011 census, its population was 49.

Ethnicity in 2011
Ethnicity	Number	Percentage
Montenegrins	27	55.1%
Serbs	18	36.7%
other/undeclared	4	8.2%
Total	49	100%
