= Majstorovina =

Majstorovina Мајсторовина
- Village
- Location within Montenegro
- Country: Montenegro
- Municipality: Bijelo Polje

Population (2011)
  - Total: 310
- Time zone: UTC+1 (CET)
  - Summer (DST): UTC+2 (CEST)

Majstorovina (Montenegrin: Мајсторовина) is a village in the municipality of Bijelo Polje, Montenegro.

== Demographics ==
According to the 2003 census, the village had a population of 327 people. The Majstorovina Monastery is located in the village.

According to the 2011 census, its population was 310.

Ethnicity in 2011
Ethnicity	Number	Percentage
Montenegrins	178	57.4%
Serbs	114	36.8%
other/undeclared	18	5.8%
Total	310	100%
