= Dovolja =

Serbian Orthodox monastery

Dovolja Monastery
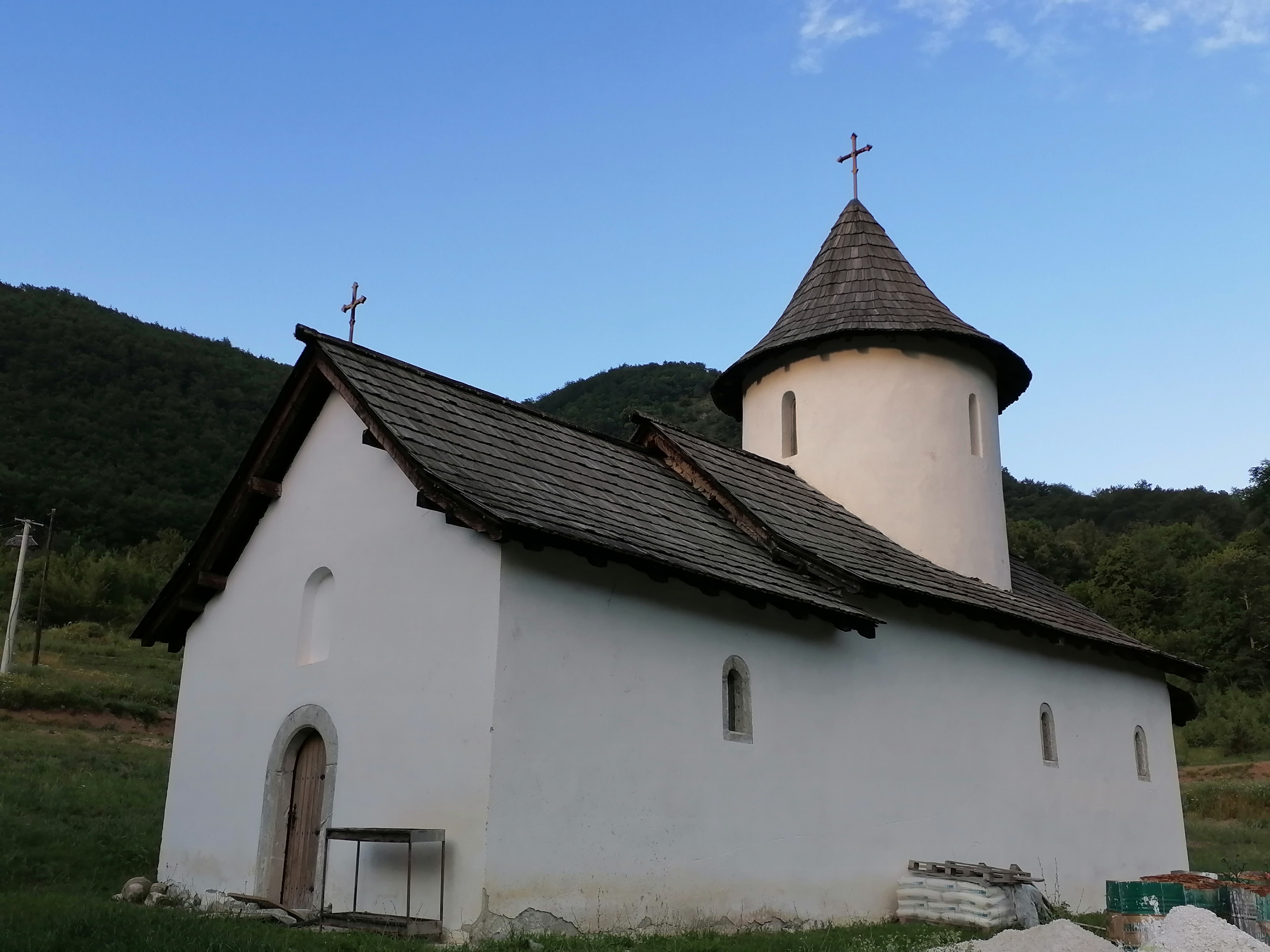

- Location within Montenegro

Religion
- Affiliation: Serbian Orthodox Christianity
- Rite: Byzantine Rite
- Year consecrated: 1513
- Status: Active

Location
- Location: Premćani, Pljevlja Municipality, Montenegro
- Interactive map of Dovolja Monastery
- Territory: Eparchy of Mileševa
- Coordinates: 43.12028°N 19.37139°E

Architecture
- Style: Raška school
- Completed: before 1513
- Materials: Stone, wood

The Dovolja Monastery (Serbian: Манастир Довоља, romanized: Manastir Dovolja) is a Serbian Orthodox monastery located on the right river banks of the Tara, near Pljevlja, in the village of Premćani within the hamlet of Dovolja. It is dedicated to the Assumption of the Holy Mother of God. It is believed to have been founded by King Stefan Milutin (r. 1282–1321) at the end of the 13th century. It was first mentioned in 1513. It is ecclesiastically administrated by the Eparchy of Mileševa. Some time after 1699, the relics of Archbishop Arsenije I were moved from Dovolja to the Dobrilovina Monastery.
