= Mihailo Dožić =

Serbian patriarch

- Hegumen of Morača Monastery
- Native name: Михаило
- Church: Serbian Orthodox Church
- Elected: 5 March 1879
- Installed: 10 March 1879 (Morača Monastery)
- Term ended: 9 June 1914
- Previous posts: Eparchy of Budimlja and Nikšić (1866–1879); Titular Hegumen of Dobrilovina Monastery (1866–1879)

Orders
- Ordination: 20 May 1865
- Consecration: 5 March 1879 by Ilarion Roganović
- Rank: Archimandrite

Personal details
- Born: Milovan Dožić; 15 November 1848 Vrujci, Kolašin Municipality, Principality of Serbia
- Died: 9 June 1914 (aged 65) Morača Monastery, Kingdom of Serbia
- Buried: Morača Monastery
- Denomination: Eastern Orthodoxy
- Residence: Dobrilovina Monastery (1866–1879); Morača Monastery (1879–1914)

Mihailo (Serbian Cyrillic: Михаило, English: Mihail; born Milovan Dožić; 15 November 1848 – 9 June 1914) was a Serbian Orthodox hierodeacon and archimandrite, who established an insurgent battalion in Potarje (in Montenegro) to fight against Ottoman Empire in the region. Having been sent in 1866 to the Dobrilovina Monastery, Dožić made the monastery the centre of the spiritual and political life and aspirations for freedom in the wide area of Potarje, and organized an insurgent battalion in the Potarje region active between 1875 and 1878 (during the Montenegrin–Ottoman War (1876–1878).

== Life ==
He belonged to the Medenica brotherhood of Donja (Lower) Morača. He was one of the sons of Mijat Dožić, who had fought against the Kolašin Turks (Ottomans). Mihailo's paternal great-grandfather was Milovan Dožić. In the late 19th century much of the Balkans were still under the Ottoman Empire.

Dožić, a young monk, was sent as an administrator by Mirko Petrović-Njegoš with the task of renovating the Serbian Orthodox Dobrilovina Monastery, which was located in Ottoman territory, in 1866. The monastery is located on the left Tara river banks, in a region known as Potarje, at the beginning of the Tara River Canyon, the deepest river canyon in Europe.

The monastery became the "centre of the spiritual and political life and aspirations for freedom in the wide area of Potarje", Dožić also having established a school that was operated secretly in the monastery, the first school in the valley of Tara — this was a very significant step towards national awakening in this region and surrounding regions. The school was temporarily moved to the nearby cave at times of Ottoman attacks. Dožić organized an insurgent battalion in the region, active between 1875 and 1878 (during the Montenegrin–Ottoman War (1876–78) and Serb–Ottoman War (1876–78)). The Ottomans had the monastery abandoned and quarters burned in 1877. On 12 June, that same year, Dožić defended Morača against Ottoman Mehmed Ali Pasha, who died in battle.

He became a hegumen of the Morača Monastery in 1879. He then served as archimandrite of the Morača Monastery. He sent his fraternal nephew Gavrilo Dožić, who had studied under his wing at Morača, to Belgrade to study in the gymnasium; Gavrilo would later serve as the 51st Patriarch of the Serbian Orthodox Church (1938–1950). Mihailo was Gavrilo's main counselor and was the one who recommended him to Nićifor Dučić for the envoy to Constantinople.

He had the bridge over the Morača river built in ca. 1900.

== Ancestry ==
Milovan Dožić
Dožić
Mijat Dožić
Mihailo Dožić
