= Korenita =

Korenita Коренита (Serbian)
- Town
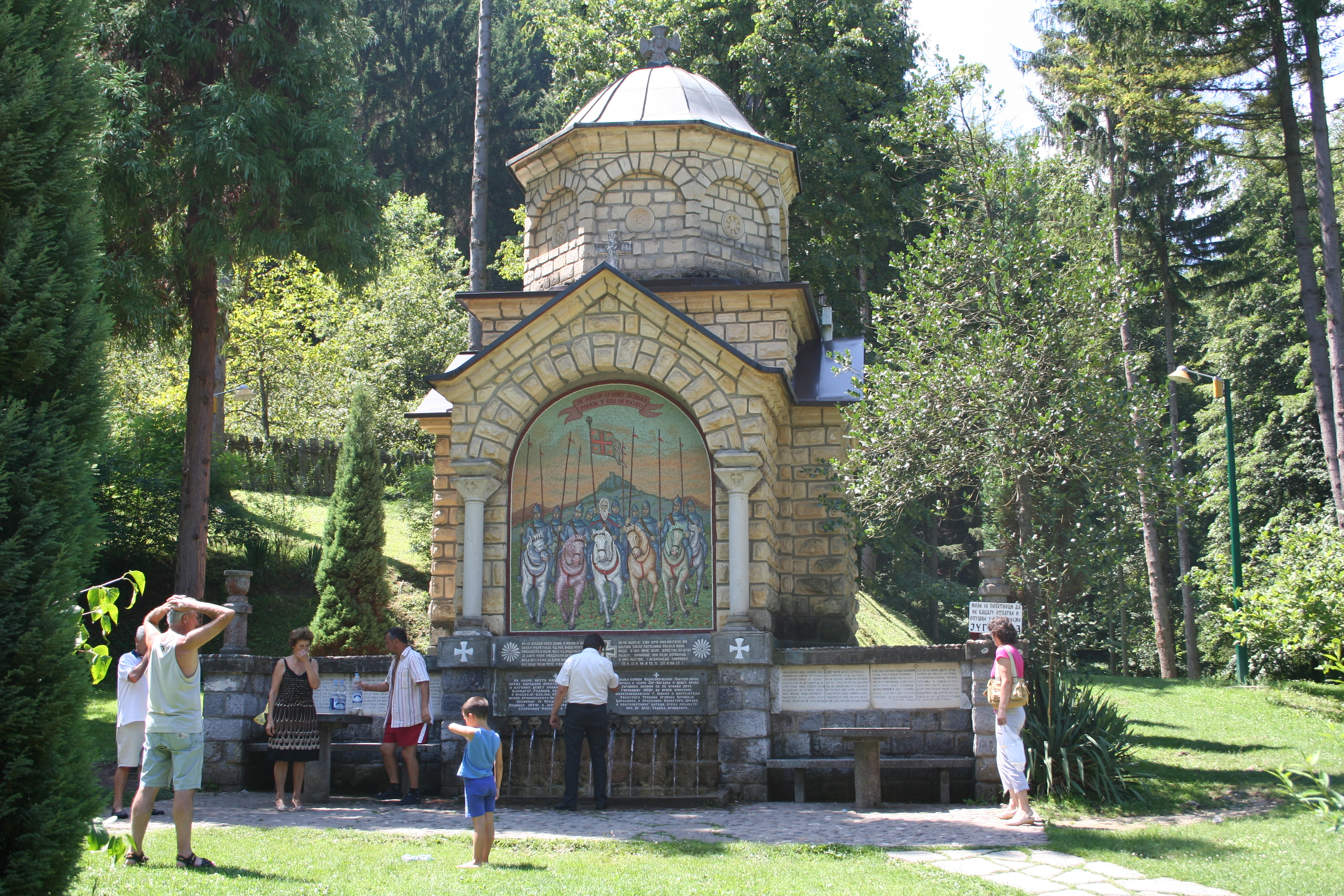
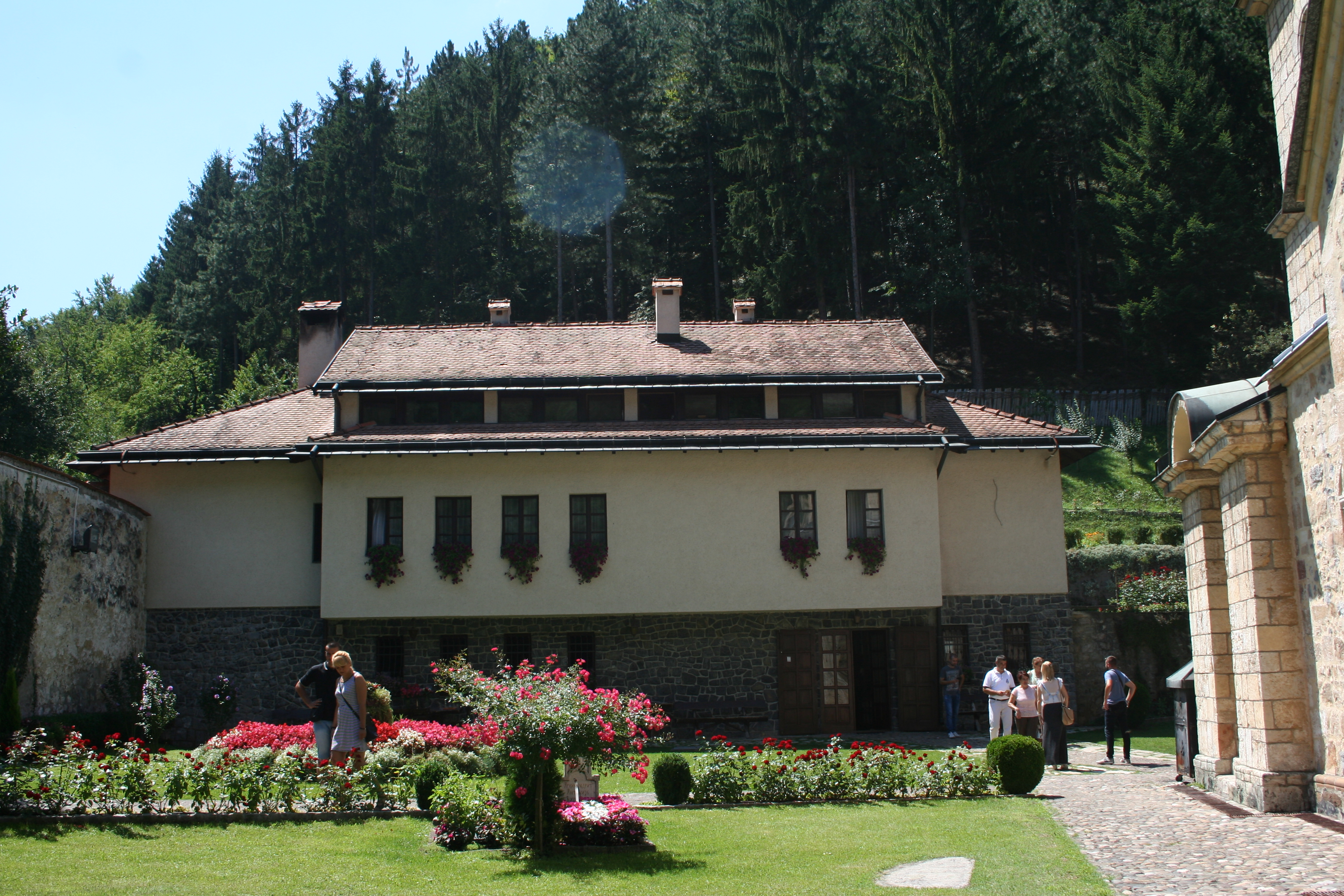
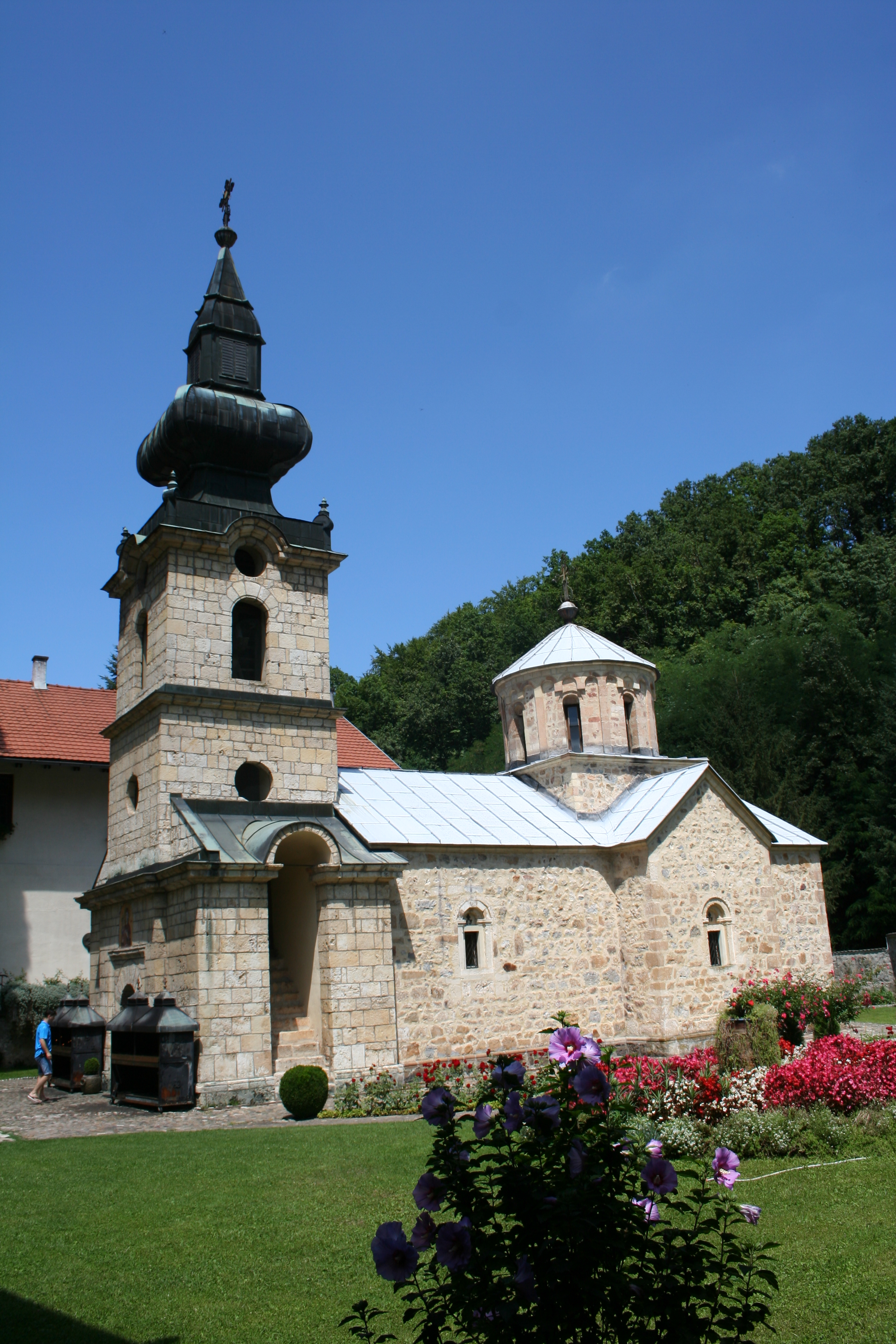
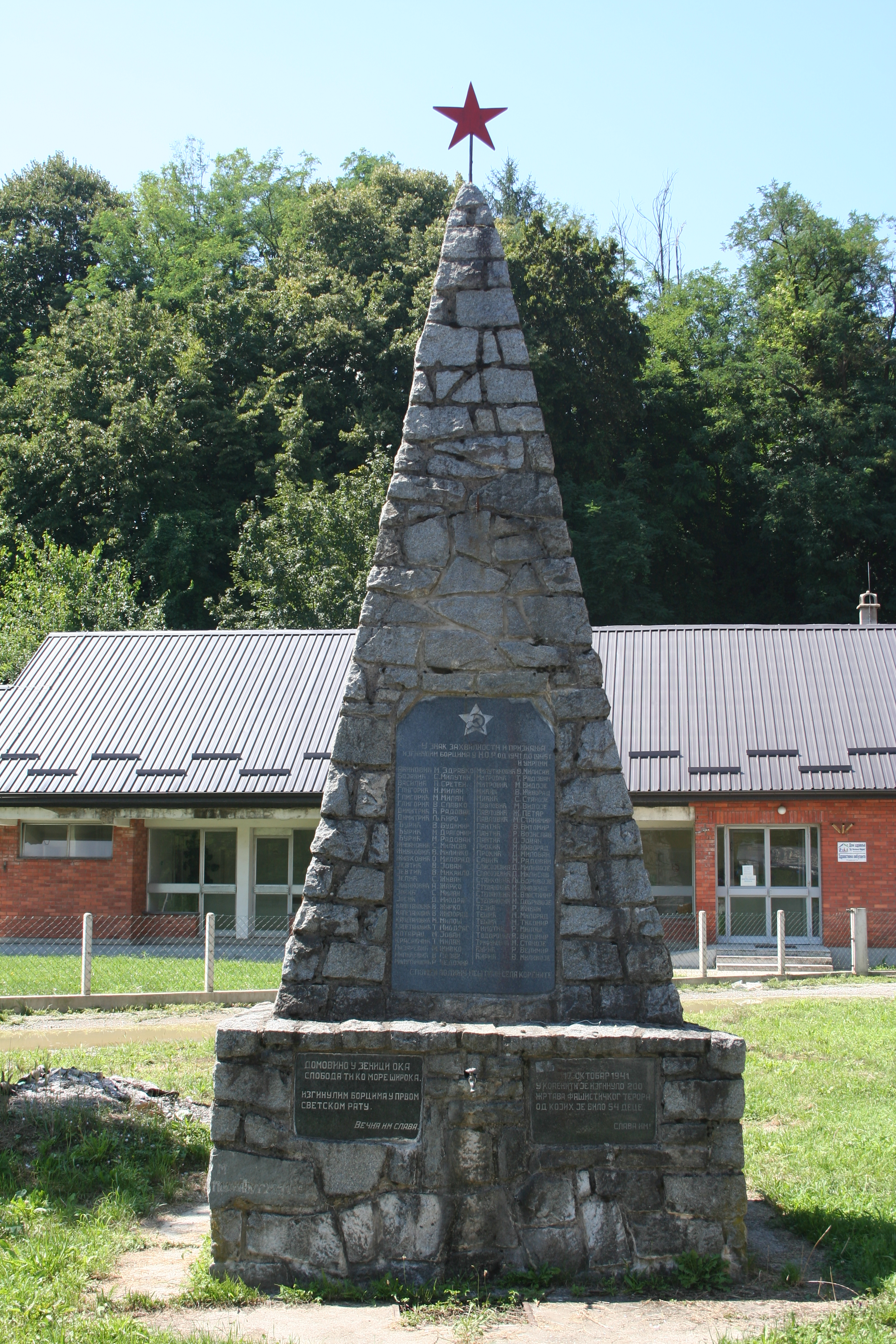

- Location within Serbia
- Coordinates: 44°30′N 19°17′E
- Country: Serbia
- District: Mačva District
- Municipality: Loznica

Population (2002)
  - Total: 2,680
- Time zone: UTC+1 (CET)
  - Summer (DST): UTC+2 (CEST)

Korenita (Serbian Cyrillic: Коренита) is a town in the municipality of Loznica, Serbia. According to the 2002 census, the town has a population of 2680 people. Korenita is situated nearby to Tomanici.
