= Tara River Canyon =

Canyon in Montenegro and Bosnia and Herzegovina

Coordinates: 43.250790077624615°N 19.008466499985335°E

Tara Canyon
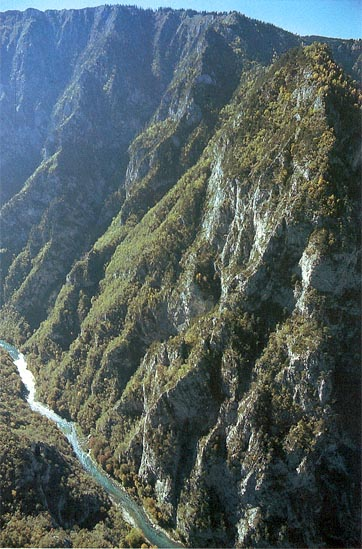
- The Tara deep down at the bottom of the Tara Canyon passing by the rock walls of Ljubišnja mountain.
- Length: 82 kilometres (51 mi) east to west ; 60 kilometres (37 mi) protected by Durmitor National Park in Montenegro
- Depth: 1,333 metres (4,400 ft) ; average depth 1,073 metres (3,500 ft)

Geology
- Age: middle and upper Triassic, upper Jurassic and upper Cretaceous

Geography
- Location: Balkans
- Country: Montenegro and Bosnia and Herzegovina
- Rivers: Tara
- Interactive map of Tara Canyon

The Tara River Canyon (Montenegrin: Kanjon Tare, Serbian Cyrillic: Кањон Таре; [kǎɲɔːn târɛː]), also known as the Tara River Gorge, is the river canyon of the Tara river. It is for the most part located in Montenegro, and in Bosnia and Herzegovina. The most attractive part of the canyon are the high rocks of the mountain range of Ljubišnja, which are located in the UNESCO World Heritage Site of Durmitor National Park. Also in Bosnia and Herzegovina, the canyon is designated nature park, and is called Tara Nature Park.

Known as "The Tear of Europe," the Tara River Gorge stands as the deepest canyon in continental Europe, the second deepest in Europe behind the Sulak Canyon.

== Geography ==
The canyon's right and left sides from the point of Crna Poda near the town of Mojkovac belong to the Municipality of Pljevlja. The canyon stretches from near Bistrica in Montenegro to Hum in Bosnia and Herzegovina, over 82 kilometers (51 miles). The last 36 kilometers form the border between Bosnia and Herzegovina and Montenegro. The canyon is up to 1,300 meters (4,300 feet) deep. Tara River Canyon is one of the deepest river canyons in Europe.

=== Tara River ===
The Tara River becomes the Drina at the point of confluence with the Piva near Hum, and is some hundred and fifty kilometers long at that point. In the park, the river has a mean fall of 3.6 meters/kilometer, with a host of cascades, offering whitewater between category 2 and 4.

Extending over 158 kilometers, the Tara River welcomes contributions from 14 rivers, boasting 69 rapids and over 40 cascades, including the prominent Crna Vrela, Bijela Vrela, Djavolje Lazi, Sokolovina, and Bijeli Kamen. The river gets large quantities of water from abundant wellsprings and a few short tributaries. The most important left bank tributaries are the Ljutica and the Sušica, while the most important right bank tributaries are the Vaskovaćka Rijeka and the Draga. The most important wellspring is the Bajlovića Sige, located on the right bank, contributing a few hundred liters per second. The water pouring from the Bučevica Cave falls into the Tara more than thirty metres high, and more than a hundred and fifty meters wide.

The roar from the cascades can be heard from the canyon peaks. Among the more than forty cascades, the most famous are Đavolje Lazi, Sokolovina, Bijeli Kamen, Gornji Tepački Buk and Donji Tepački Buk, Borovi, Čegrlo, Brstanovački Buk, Vjernojevići... Best part of Tara River for rafting with biggest fall is start point from Brštanovica location.

Because of the quality of its water, and because of its unique ecological system, Tara River Gorge earned UNESCO recognition in 1977 as part of the "Man and Biosphere" program (“Čovjek i biosfera”) and entered into the world's ecological biosphere reservations, protecting it under an international convention.

The river, together with the Drina river, is Europe's main habitat and spawning ground for huchen (Hucho hucho).

== Protection ==
Within Montenegro, the canyon is protected as a part of Durmitor National Park and is a UNESCO World Heritage Site.

Recently, local government of the administrative entity of Bosnia and Herzegovina, Republika Srpska, on whose territory the river Tara and its canyon are located within Bosnia and Herzegovina, decided to protect the stretch that lies within Bosnia and Herzegovina borders. The entity government designated area as a protected landscape and category V - nature park under IUCN categorization, thus establishing the Tara Nature Park.

This means that with the Durmitor National Park in Montenegro, Tara River Basin biosphere reserve by UNESCO, and newly designated Tara Nature Park in Bosnia and Herzegovina, the entirety of the canyon is now protected in accordance with the laws of these countries.

The canyon features rocky and pebbly terraces, sandy beaches, high cliffs, and more than 80 large caves.

== Dam controversy ==
The governments of Montenegro and the Republika Srpska entity in Bosnia and Herzegovina had plans to flood a considerable part of the gorge, to construct one or more hydroelectric dams on the Drina and possibly the Tara. A plan to construct dams in Bosnia and Herzegovina on the Drina river, has not been abandoned.

One proposed dam at Buk Bijela village, some 15 kilometers downstream of border with Montenegro and the confluence of the Tara with the Piva river, the Buk Bijela Hydro Power Plant, although apparently abandoned in April 2005 after successful protests, was reconsidered as recently as 2018. A concession was given to HE Buk Bijela company created in Foča in 2018. A September 2006 cooperation agreement between Slovenian company Petrol and Montenegrin company Montenegro-bonus specified construction of a 40–60 megawatt hydroelectric plant.

== Water sports ==
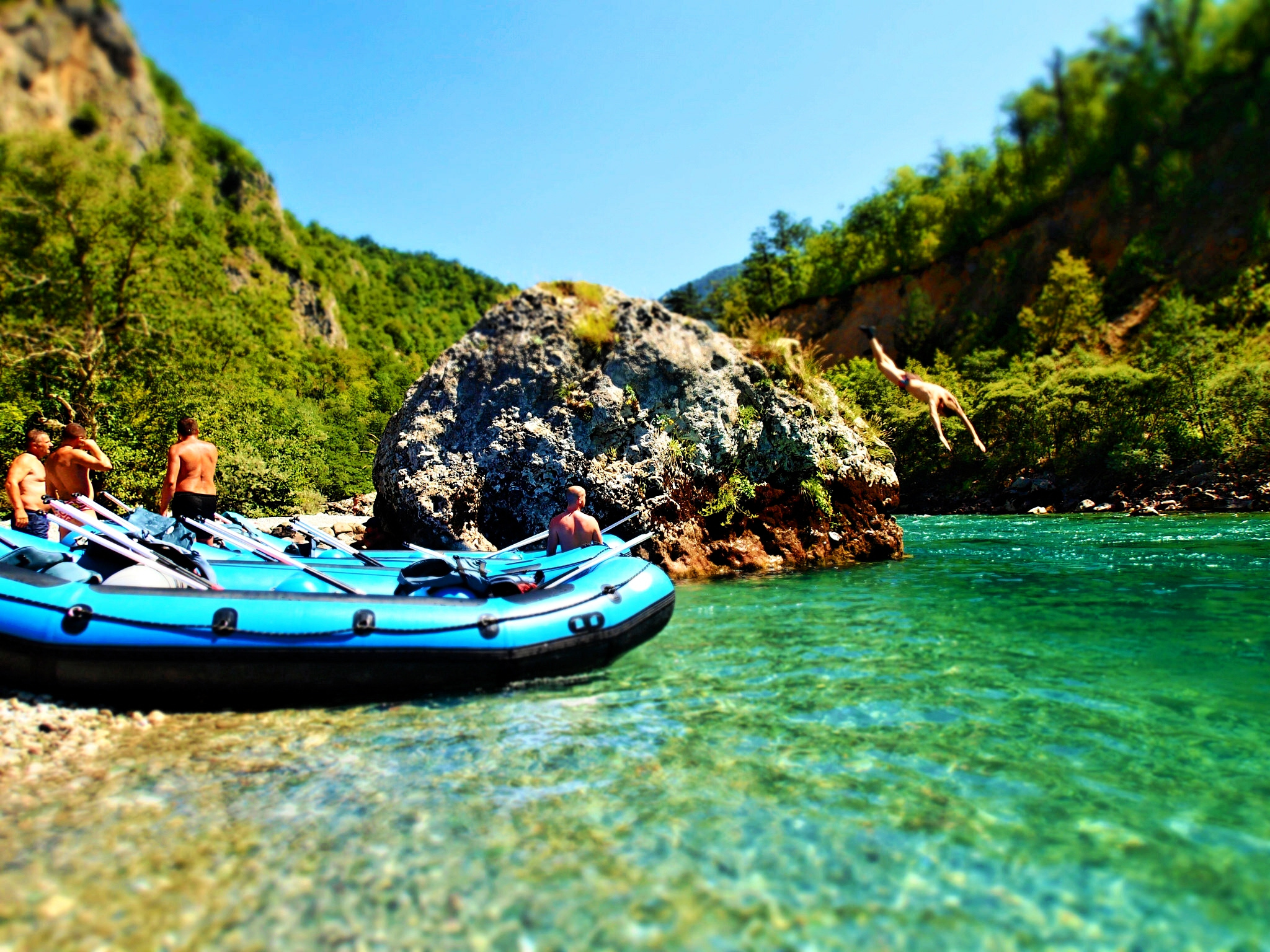
Rafting at Tara River Canyon between Bosnia and Montenegro

The canyon is part of the Tara River rafting route. The one-day rafting route runs from Brstnovica to Sćepan Polje. It is 14 kilometres (8.7 mi) miles long. This part of the canyon has the steepest drop in elevation. It includes 22 out of 55 rapids in that part of the Tara. The rapids are Brstanovići, Pećine, Celije and Vjernovički. The longer rafting route covers 60 kilometres (37 mi). The route begins with the waterfalls of Ljutica and passes under the 541 feet high monumental bridge. Next is the old Roman road and the Lever Tara. "Funjički Bukovi" and "Bijele Ploče" rapids are followed by "Nisovo Vrelo", the deepest part of the canyon is under Obzir Location. It is best visible at Bailovica Sige waterfalls. Further is the bottom of Curevac mountain that reaches 1,650 metres (5,410 ft).

In 2005 and 2009, the European Championships in Rafting were held in Bosnia and Herzegovina on the Vrbas and Tara rivers.
