= Tara (Drina) =

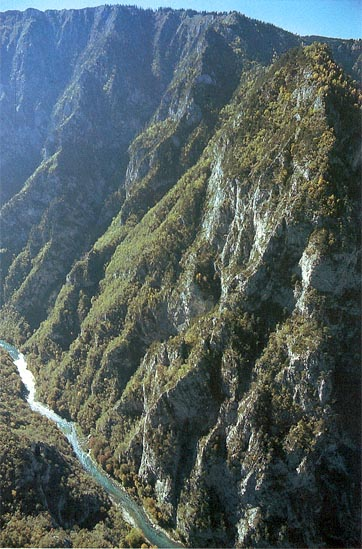
- Tara River Canyon

Location
- Country: Montenegro and Bosnia and Herzegovina

Physical characteristics
- Source: Confluence of the Opasnica and Veruša
  - location: Komovi Mountains, Montenegro
- Mouth
  - location: Drina
  - coordinates: 43.3484°N 18.8396°E
- Length: 146 km (91 mi)
- Basin size: 2,006 km^{2} (775 sq mi)

Basin features
- Progression: Drina→ Sava→ Danube→ Black Sea

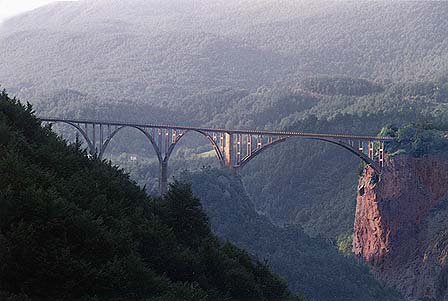
Đurđevića Tara Bridge on Tara River

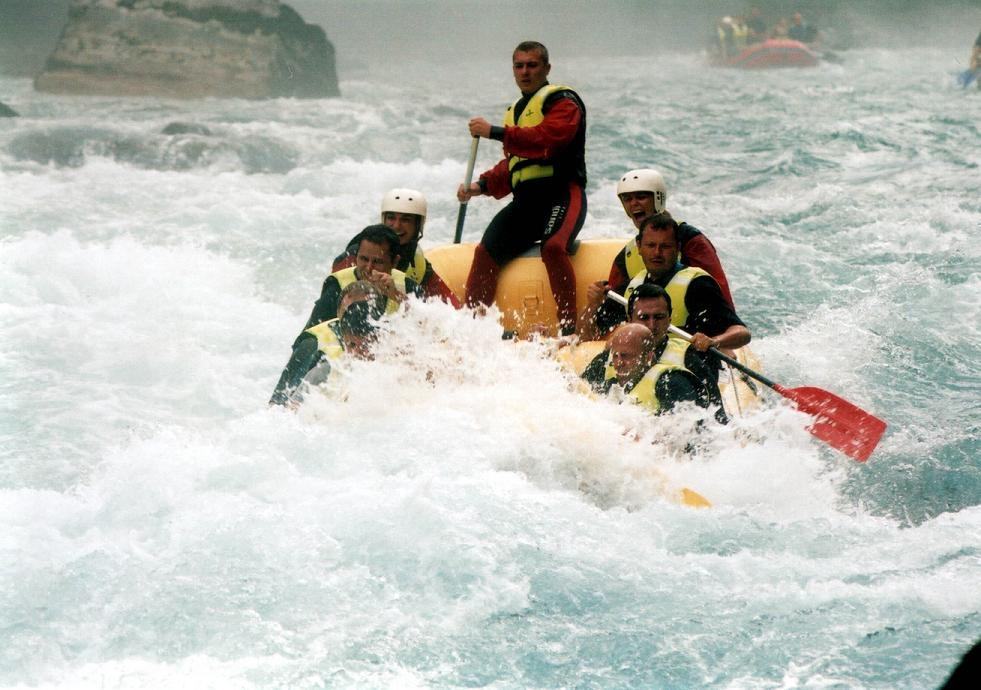
Rafting on Tara River in Montenegro

The Tara is a river in Montenegro and Bosnia and Herzegovina. It emerges from the confluence of the Opasnica and Veruša rivers in the Komovi Mountains, part of the Dinaric Alps of Montenegro. The total length is 143 km (89 mi), of which 141 km (88 mi) are in or on the border of Montenegro, it also forms the border between the two countries in several places. The Tara flows from south to north-northwest and converges with the Piva at the Bosnia and Herzegovina and Montenegro border between the villages of Šćepan Polje (Montenegro) and Hum (Bosnia and Herzegovina) to form the Drina river (a branch of the Danube watershed).

The Tara River cuts the Tara River Canyon, the longest canyon in Montenegro and Europe and third longest in the world after Grand Canyon and Fish River Canyon at 78 kilometres (48 mi) in length and 1,300 metres (4,300 ft) at its deepest. The canyon is protected as a UNESCO World Heritage Site. A part of the canyon includes the Durmitor National Park. The river takes its name from the Illyrian Autariatae tribe, whose territory included the river valley in classical antiquity.

== Ecology ==
=== Ichthyofauna ===
The Tara river is rich in endemic salmonid fish species, huchen (Latin: Hucho hucho), otherwise globally endangered, and together with the river Drina and most of its tributaries, such as the Piva river before damming, the Bistrica, Ćehotina, Lim, Prača, Drinjača, Sutjeska, it is still Europe's premier habitat and spawning grounds.

== Tourism and recreation ==
Rafting is very popular on Tara River. It is also one of the most popular forms of recreation in Montenegro and Bosnia and Herzegovina. The one-day rafting route, from Brstnovica to Šćepan Polje is 18 km (11 mi) long and it takes 2 to 3 hours. Among the attractions of the area is Đurđevića Tara Bridge, on the crossroads between Mojkovac, Žabljak and Pljevlja.

Rafting starts at Splavista from where one starts the 100 km (62 mi) . Already at the beginning the Tara, the waterfalls of Ljutica are seen and then, one passes under the 165-metre (541 ft) high Đurđevića Tara Bridge. The old Roman road can then be seen as rafters pass through the Lever Tara, "Funjički bukovi", and "Bijele ploče". "Nisovo vrelo" is the deepest part of the canyon at 1,100 metres (3,600 ft) high. Further is the bottom of the mountain top, "Curevac" (1,650 metres; 5,410 ft), that rises above Tara as its "eternal guardian". Rafting trips meet the waterfalls of Draga and then pass through the Radovan luka, the "Canyon of Sušica", "Tepački bukovi", "Brstanovički bukovi" and "Bailovica sige", ending at Sćepan Polje.

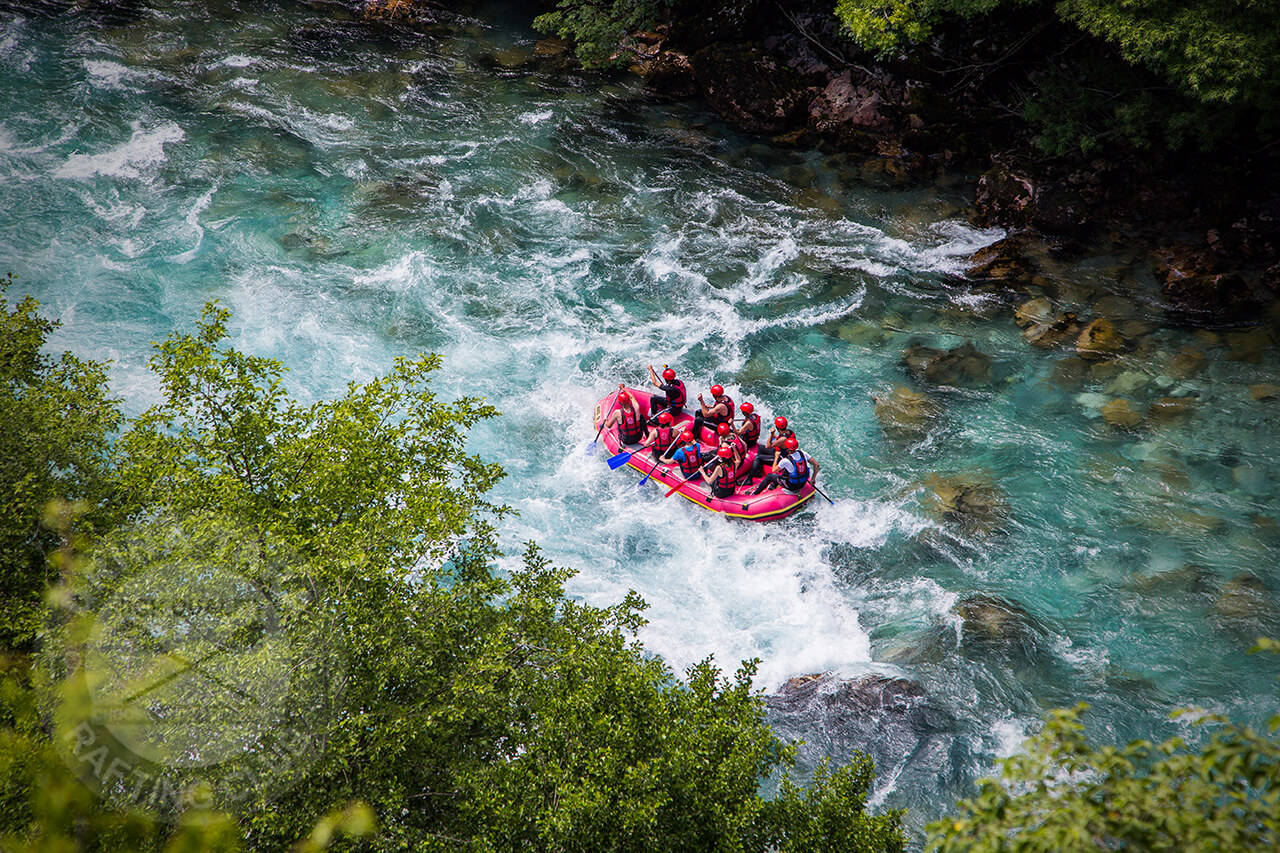
Rafting on the Tara River

In 2005, the European Championships in Rafting were held on the Vrbas and the Tara rivers in Bosnia and Herzegovina. According to the International Rafting Federation, the event was hugely successful. In May 2009 the World Rafting Championships were held again in Bosnia and Herzegovina on the Vrbas and Tara rivers.

== Planned damming ==
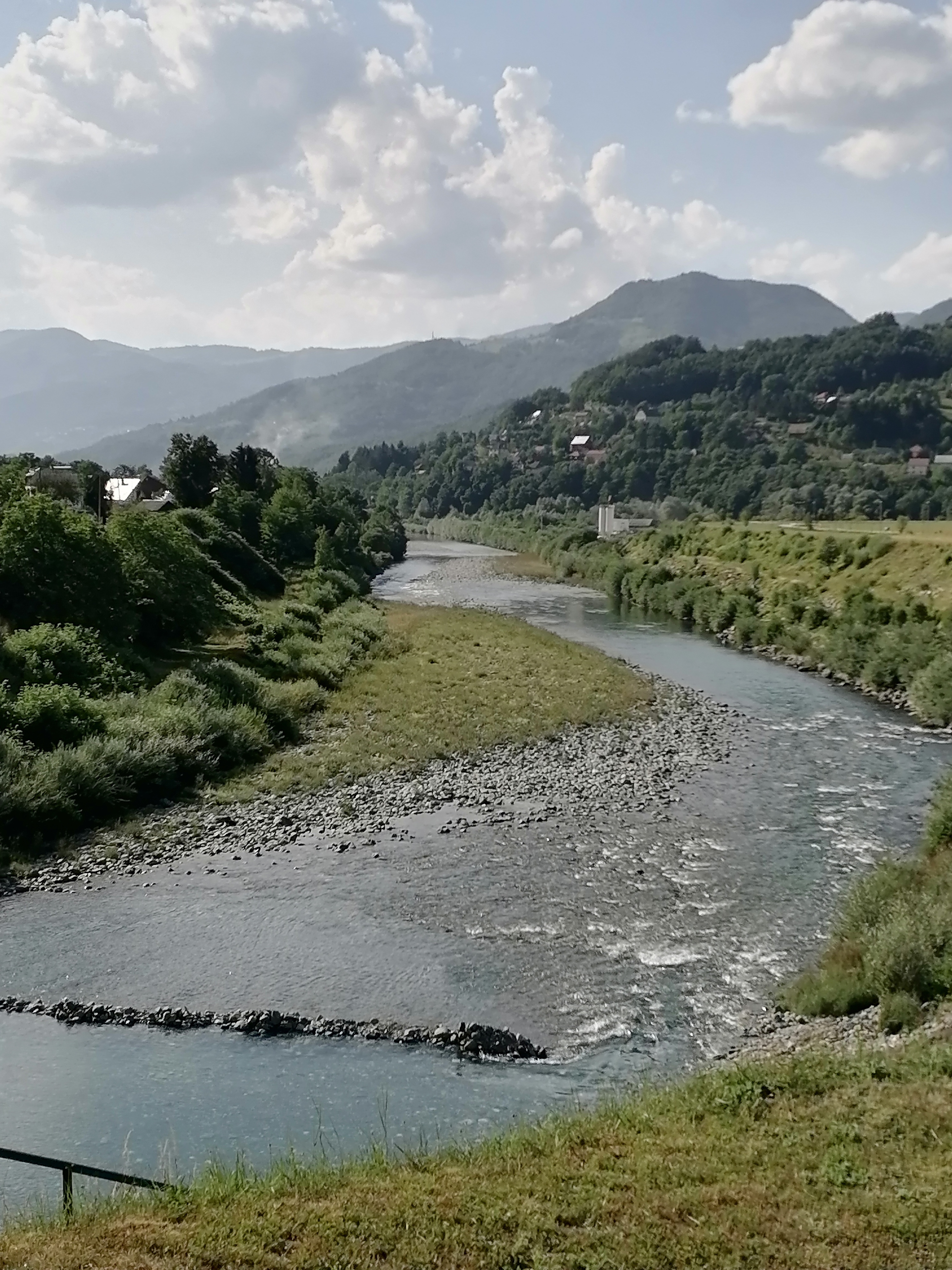

The governments of Montenegro and Republika Srpska entity in Bosnia and Herzegovina had plans to flood the Tara river and considerable part of its gorge, with the construction of at least one and possibly more hydroelectric dams on the Drina and possibly the Tara itself.

A plan to construct dams in Bosnia and Herzegovina on the Drina river, has never been shelved completely.

One at Buk Bijela village, some 15 kilometres (9.3 mi) downstream of border with Montenegro and the confluence of the Tara with the Piva river, the Buk Bijela Hydro Power Plant, although apparently abandoned in April 2005, after several successful protests by environmental activists in favor of preserving both the rivers and the canyon, is now being seriously reconsidered, as recently as 2018, and concessions were given to a company "HE Buk Bijela" created in Foča in 2018, for this purpose.

Also, although much older, signed in September 2006, a cooperation agreement between the Slovenian company Petrol and the Montenegrin company "Montenegro-bonus" to plan a construction of a 40-60 megawatts hydroelectric power plant, despite all efforts to protect the gorge, is still a considerable environmental threat for the Drina and the Tara.

== See also ==
- Morača
- Una
