= Ovčar Banja =

Ovčar Banja Овчар Бања
- Village
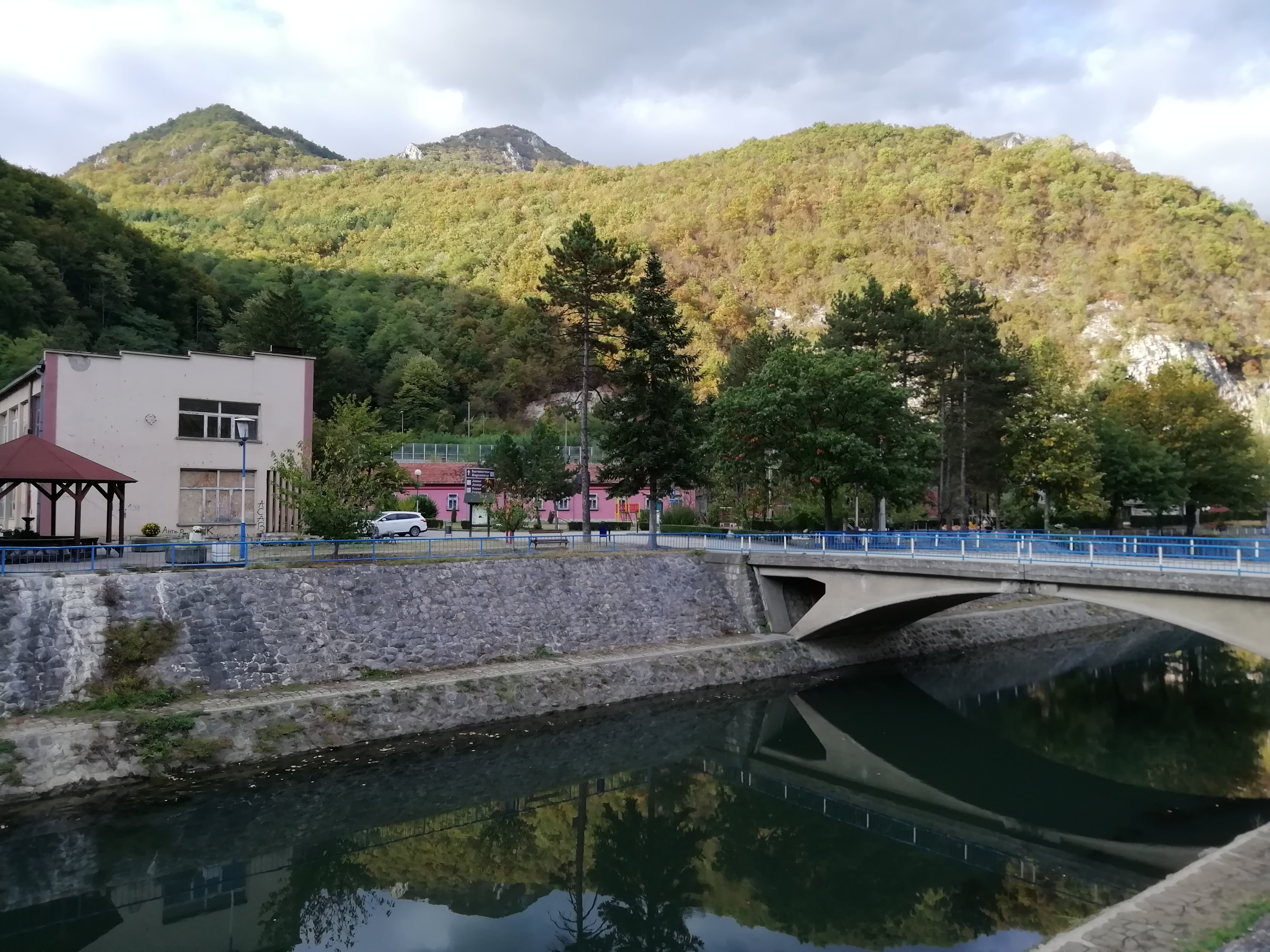
- Ovčar Banja spa town landscape in October 2019

- Location within Serbia
- Coordinates: 43.883°N 20.183°E
- Country: Serbia
- District: Moravica District
- Municipality: Čačak

Area
  - Total: 0.35 km^{2} (0.14 sq mi)
- Elevation: 278 m (912 ft)

Population (2011)
  - Total: 122
  - Density: 350/km^{2} (900/sq mi)
- Time zone: UTC+1 (CET)
  - Summer (DST): UTC+2 (CEST)
- Postal code: 32242
- Area code: +381(0)32
- Car plates: ČA
- Climate: Cfb

Ovčar Banja (Serbian Cyrillic: Овчар Бања) is a village and a spa located in the city of Čačak, Serbia. Located near the Ovčar-Kablar Gorge in the valley of the West Morava, it is known as the "Serbian Mount Athos" because of the numerous monasteries situated in this area. As of 2011 census, it has a population of 122 inhabitants.

The monasteries of Vavedenje, Nikolje, Jovanje, Preobraženje, Sretenje, Svete Trojice, Blagoveštenje, Uspenije, Vaznesenje and Ilinje have existed in this gorge for centuries. The church of St. Sava and the cave church Kađenica are also situated in this region.

== Geography ==
The hydrogeological researches were insufficient, though they were conducted in two periods, 1978–83 and 1989–92. It was concluded that the spa area represents a complex, discontinuous water-bearing terrain. The terrain itself is the tectonically damaged and karstified limestone from the Middle Triassic. The land was drilled up to 50 m (160 ft), where the hot water of 58 °C (136 °F) was discovered. There is also an unusual hot spring in the bed of the West Morava itself which noticeably warms the river's waters in the spring area. First expert medical opinion on the healing properties of the hot mineral springs in the area and the chemical composition of the thermal waters dates from 1856. That year, dr Emmerich P. Lindenmayer, chief of the Serbian Army Medical Corps, handed over a report on the spa to the government.

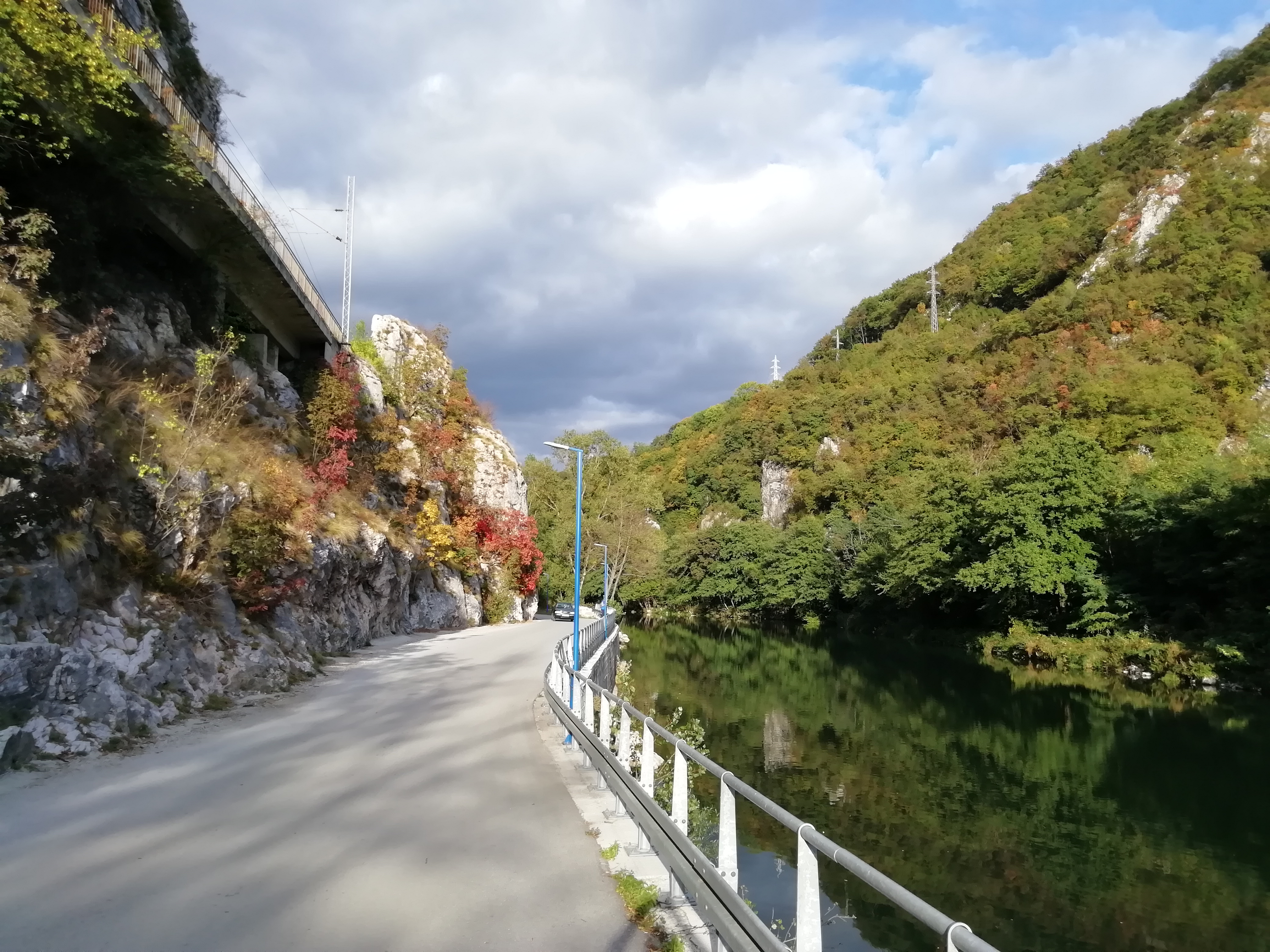
Ovčar Banja landscape

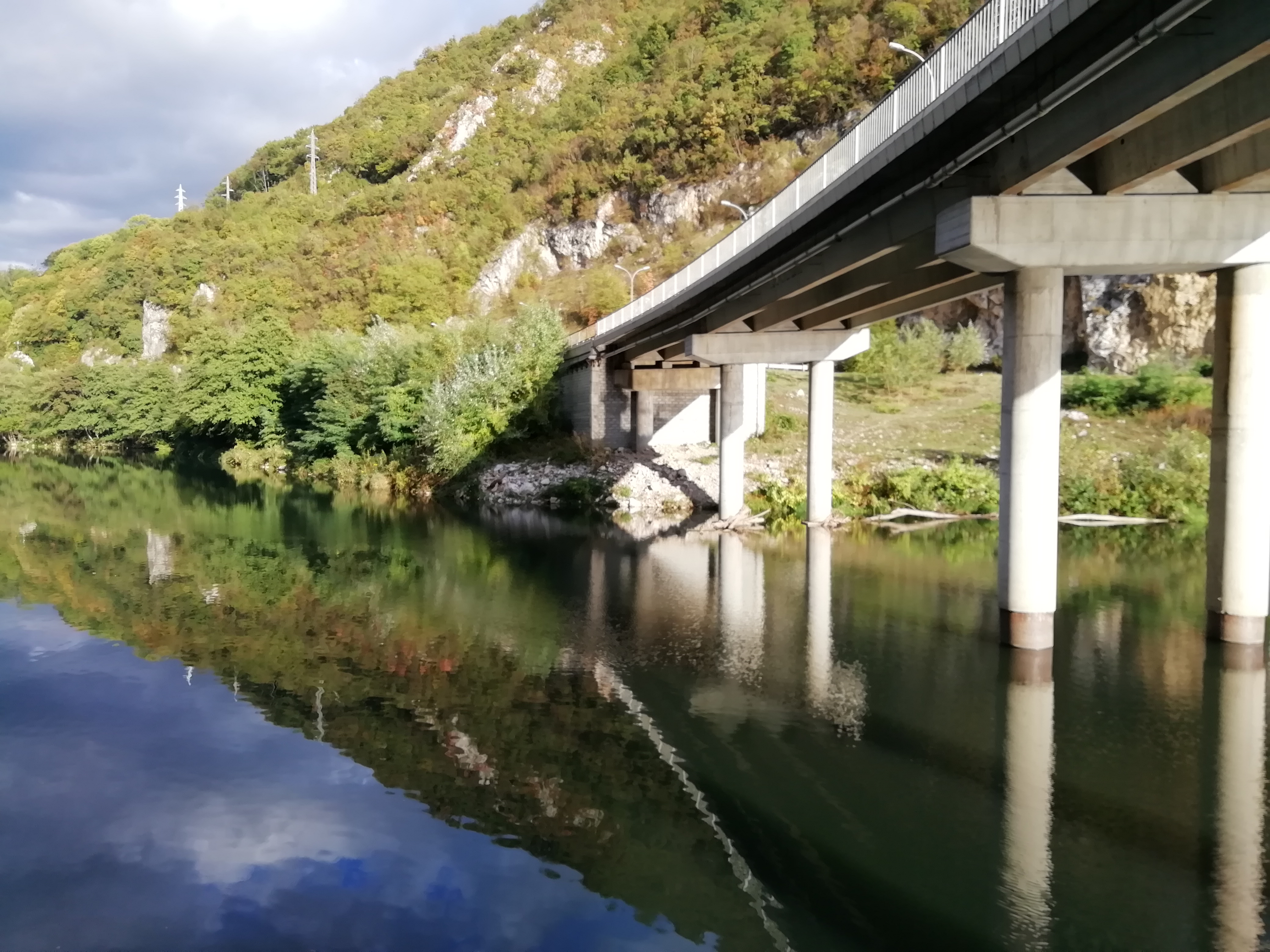
River under new road bridge

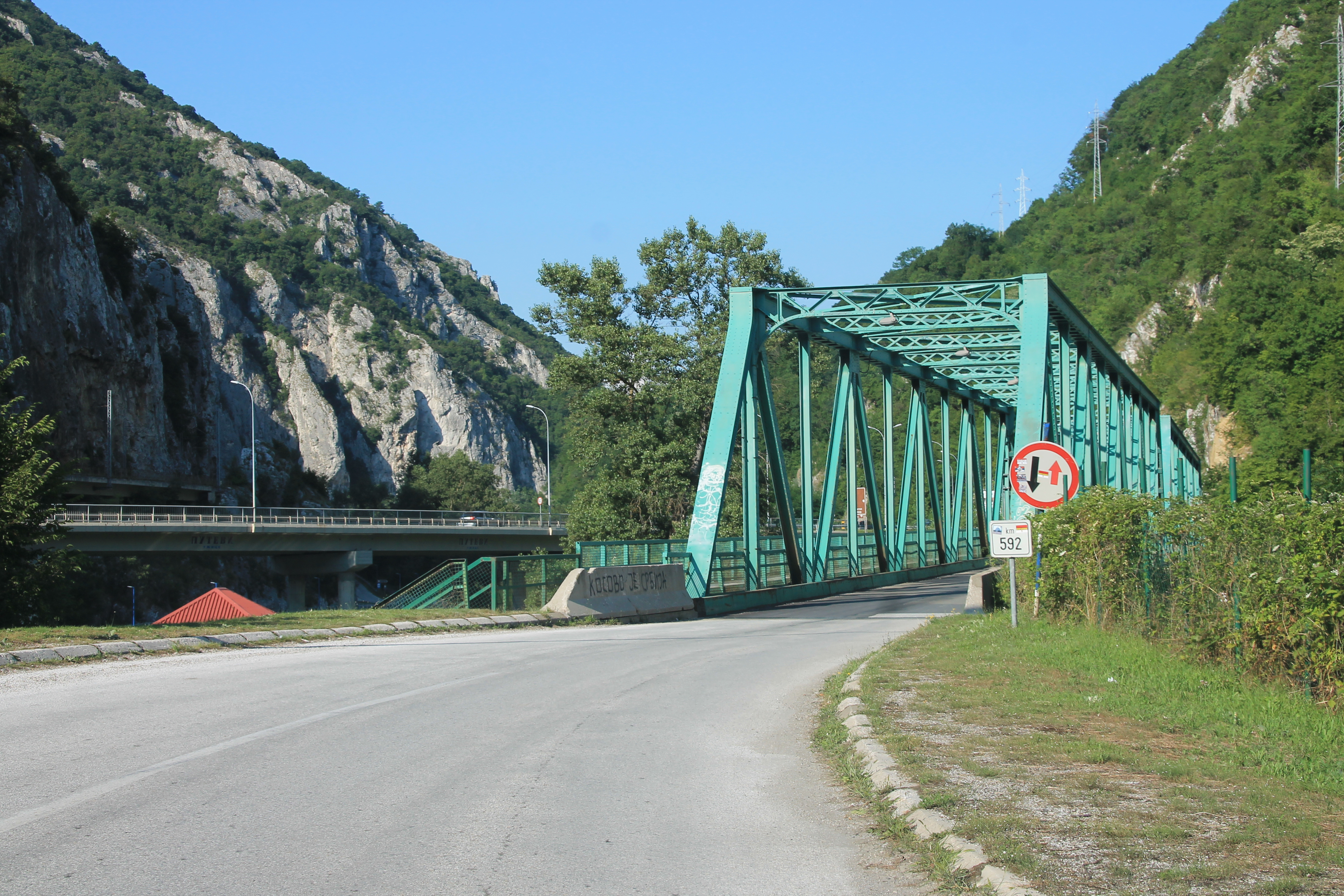
Old Road bridge in Ovčar Banja

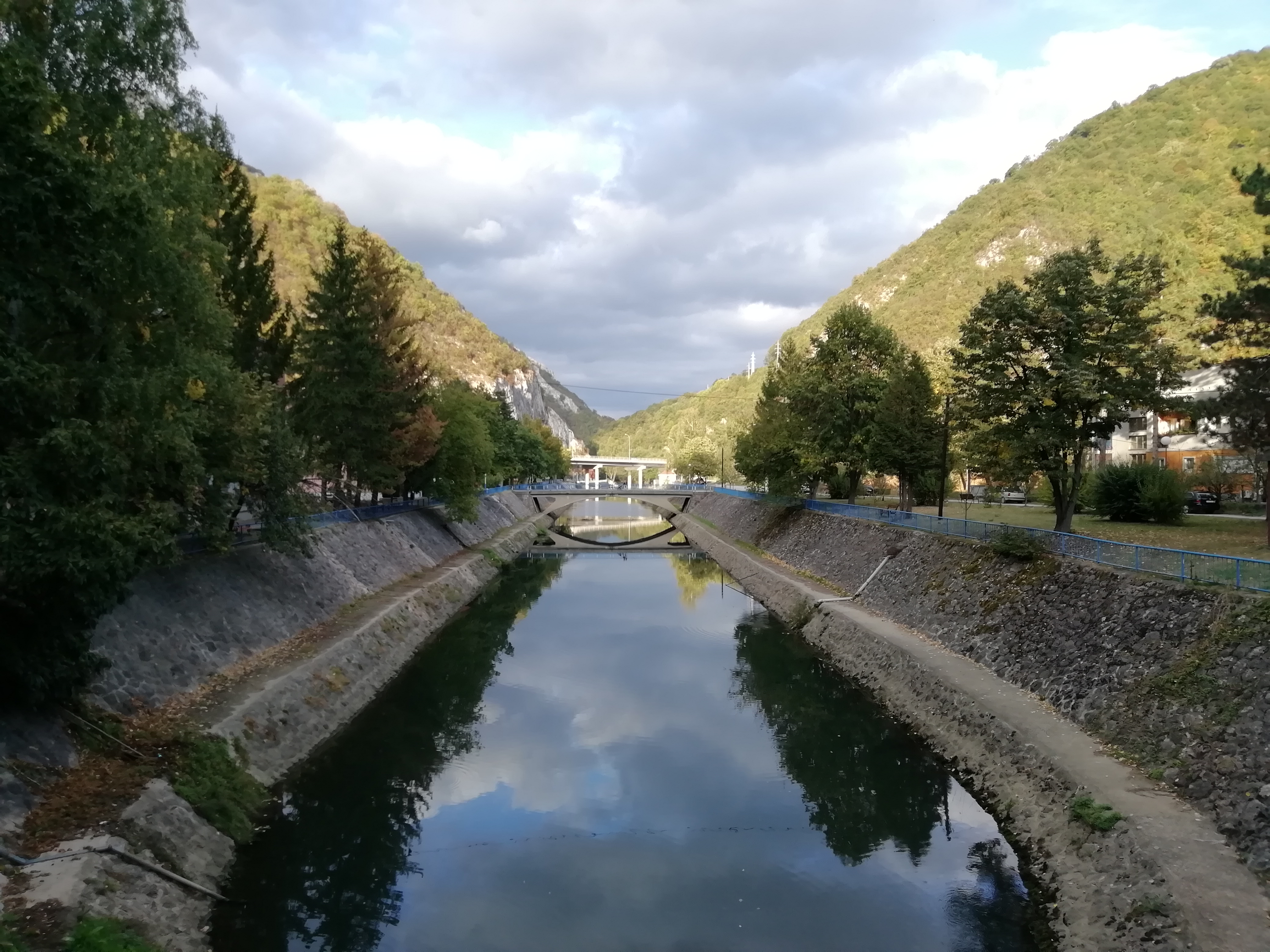
River in Ovčar Banja

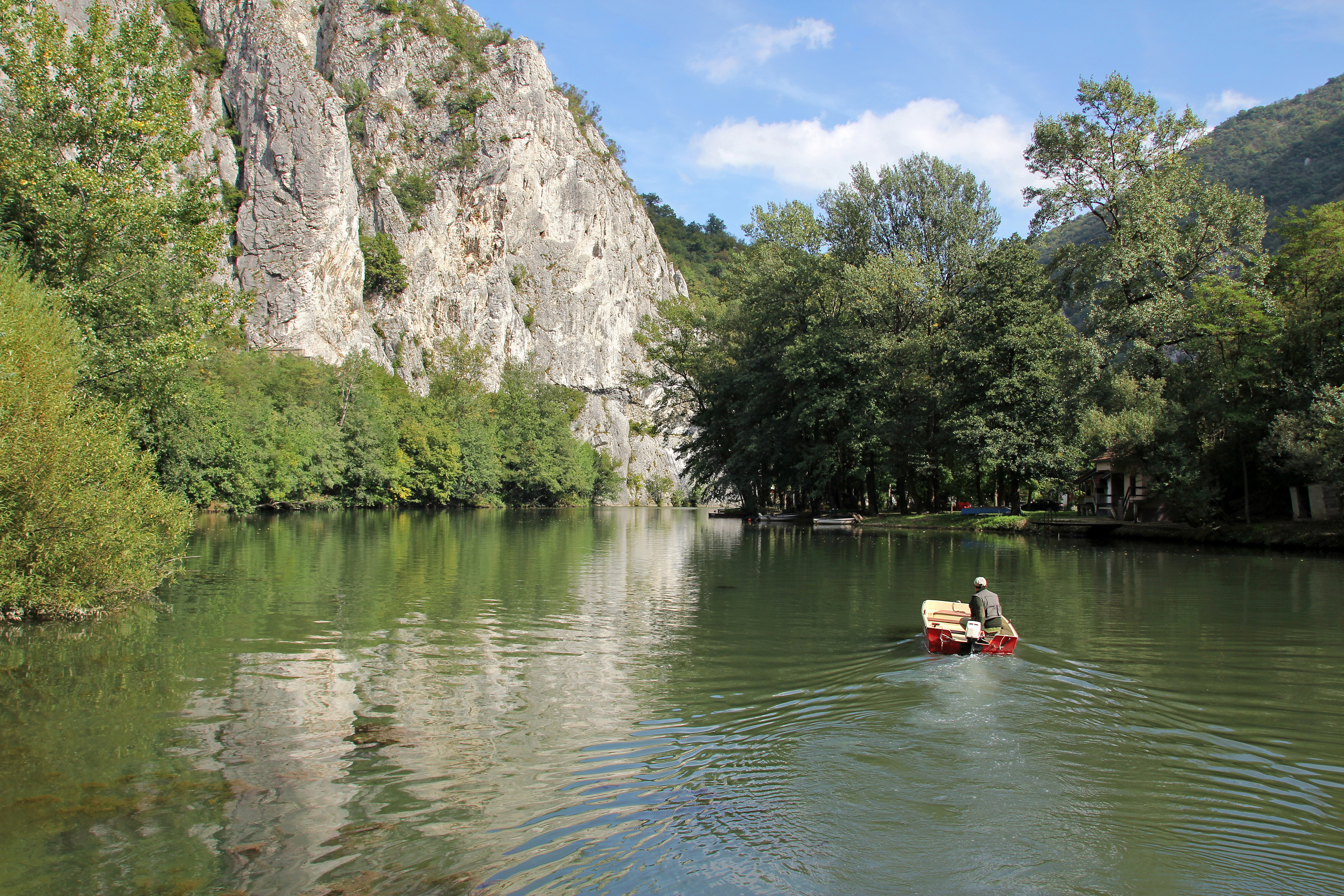
Međuvršje Lake

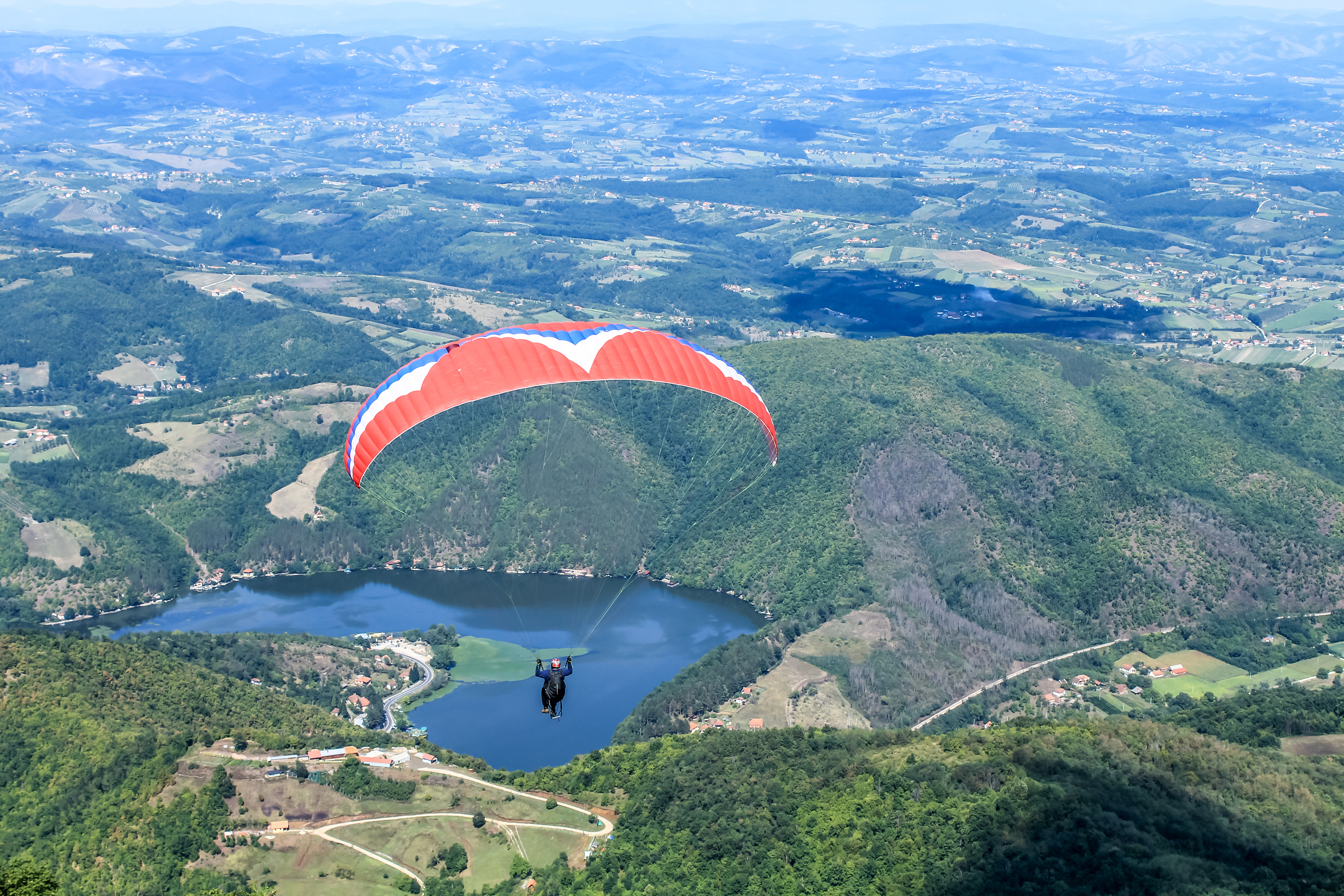
View from top of Ovčar

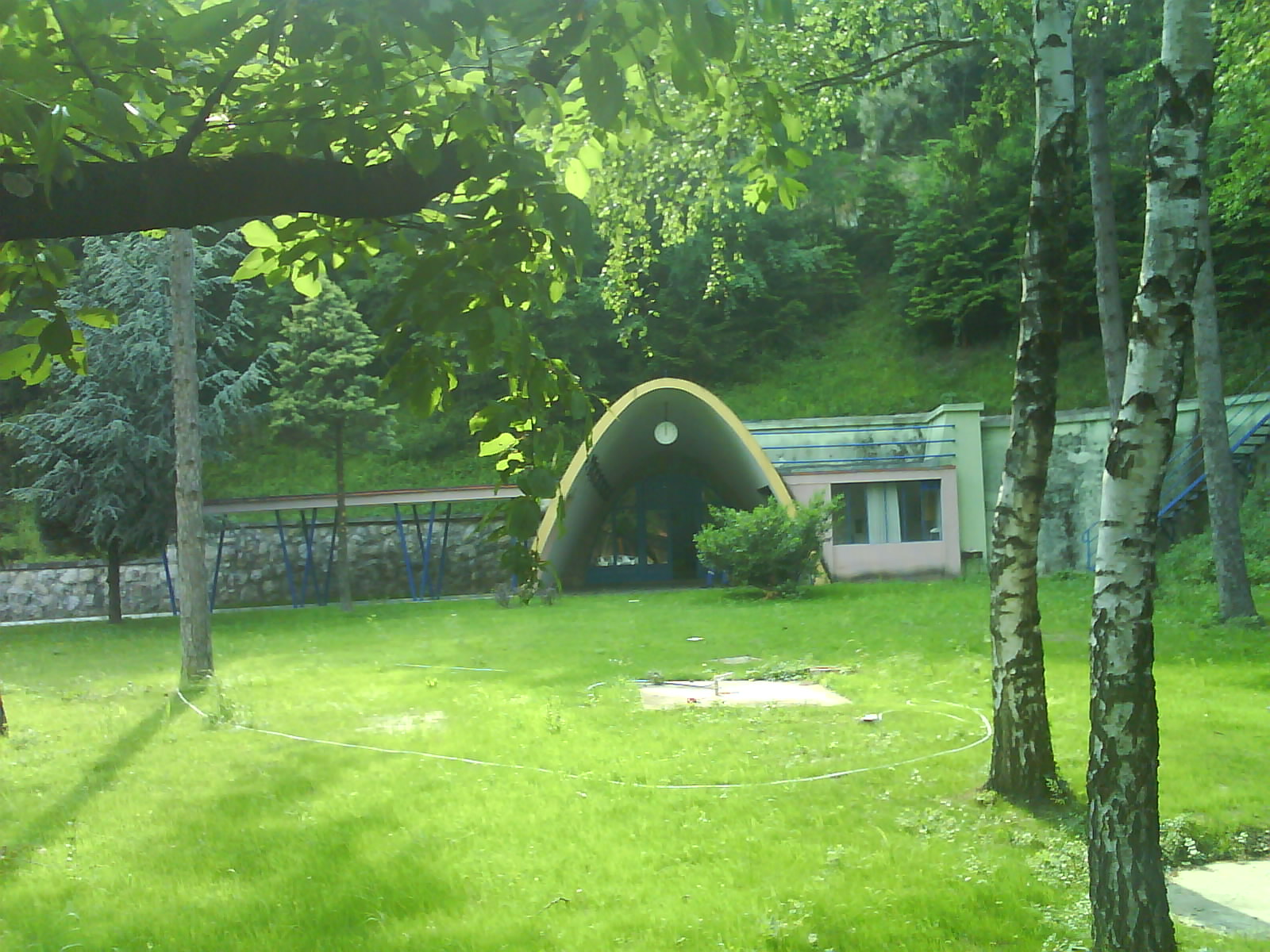
Ovčar Banja hydroelectric power plant building

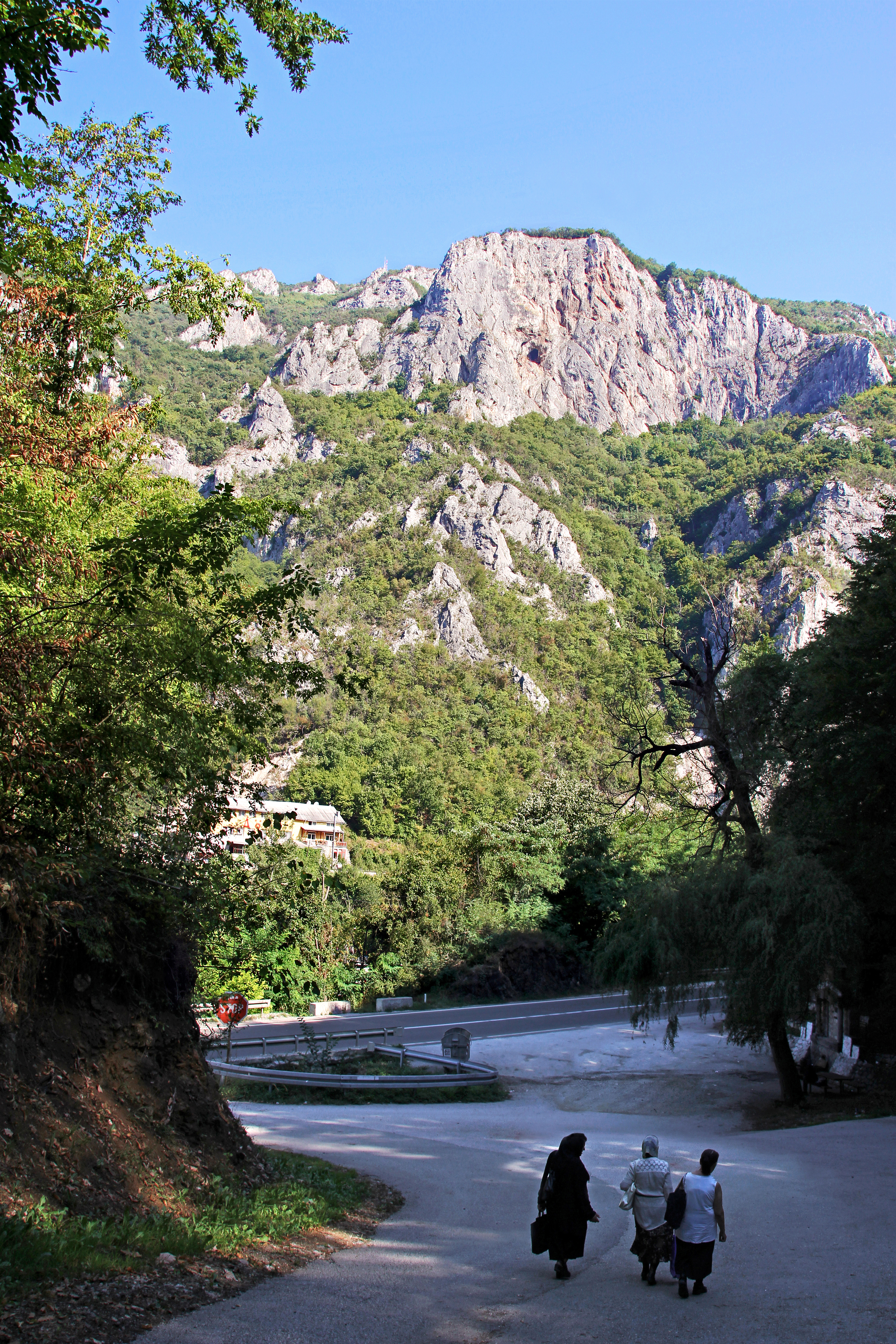
Ovčar-Kablar Gorge landscape

== History ==
=== Medieval ===
In the medieval Serbia, Ovčar Banja was the largest and the best-known spa. Later, Ottoman traveler Evliya Çelebi visited the spa in 1664 and wrote: In the vicinity of this settlement in the mountains rich with trees, there are baths. Even during the times of the Christian kings, on this healing waters magnificent high domes were built, a large pool, numerous coolers, large living rooms and dressing rooms. Yearly, in the watermelon season, 40,000 to 50,000 souls gather, the fairs are being held and the trade is blooming. As the water of these spas is very hot, a cold water is being added to it.

The area is known for the myths on golden treasure hidden in the caves, originating from the medieval period. There is also the story of the secret entrance into the Turčinovac cave, which was sealed by the Ottomans who walled in, and killed, an entire group of exiled Serbs.

=== Modern ===
A hydroelectric plant "Ovčar Banja" was built on West Morava in 1954, and the dam prevented former frequent flooding of the village which is located in the bend of the river.

Administratively, Ovčar Banja was formed as a separate settlement in 1955, after being detached from the village of Vrnčani.

New treasure hunting fever began in 1963 when one of the locals, searching for the "buried treasure" under the Kablar mountain, discovered entry into the underground pits and caves at the Ridovi locality. News on his endeavor spread through the surrounding villages, which soon developed into the ghostly stories of human and animal bones and remains, and of mysterious forces which extinguished fires of the candles and lamps, preventing further advance of the explorers. A group of children discovered the bag full of gold, which turned out to be 17 brass applications for old clothes.

Ancient myths mixed with the recent history, and stories of hidden gold buried by the Četniks at the end of World War II. In 1965, the state intelligence agency UDBA, began its own action on treasure hunt, under the code name "Morava". According to the local UDBA member Pantelija Vasović (1926–2016), they arrested famous spy Duško Popov, who was digging for gold in Ovčar Banja, pretending to be the tourist. He was looking for Četniks's gold upon the instruction of British colonel Bill Hudson. The UDBA continued to search for gold, bringing former Četnik member from Blace to give them the location, but he was found hanged in his hotel room in Ovčar Banja. After the 1966 fall of UDBA's chief, Aleksandar Ranković, the "Morava" action was used as one of the accusations against him, connecting him to "Četniks' gold", "murder of peasant from Blace" and collaboration with the British intelligence, though historians believe that Ranković's goal was to find the missing central archive of Četniks' leader Draža Mihailović.

On 29 December 2011, the Government of Serbia declared Ovčar Banja as the 28th official spa in Serbia. Designated area covers 867 ha (2,140 acres) on the territories of the City of Čačak and the Municipality of Lučani.

In 2006, a railroad bridge was built across the West Morava, with three pairs of supporting pillars being placed in the river, opposite to the water flow. Additionally, in times the river bed got filled with silt and rocks and the water level grew by 2 m (6 ft 7 in), so the village was flooded in March 2016, first time after the dam was completed. The works on the river were conducted in 2016–17. The waterway was dredged, 19,000 m^{3} (670,000 cu ft) of material was taken out and the water level was returned to the 1954 height. In the process, the river course was slightly straightened and an island was carved between the natural course of the river and a canal dug for the plant, with Ovčar Banja being situated on the new, artificially created isle. The material dredged out from the river was used to further solidify the embankments and mass wasting slopes, dug by the river, around the village. Intervention would also rise the working effects coefficient of the hydro plant's aggregates.

== Demographics ==
Historical population
Year	Pop.	±%
1948	185	—
1953	241	+30.3%
1961	310	+28.6%
1971	191	−38.4%
1981	203	+6.3%
1991	184	−9.4%
2002	168	−8.7%
2011	122	−27.4%

According to the 2011 census results, the village of Ovčar Banja has a population of 122 inhabitants.

== Characteristics ==
The spring produces 35 L (7.7 imp gal; 9.2 US gal) per minute of hot thermal mineral water, heated from 35 to 37.5 °C (95.0 to 99.5 °F). It is beneficial for the rheumatic diseases, spondylosis, arthrosis and bone fractures. The spa bath, which was renovated in 2011, consists of two pools and the hot water is transported to the bath by pipes over the outflow canal of the "Ovčar Banja" hydroelectric power plant.

== See also ==
- List of spa towns in Serbia
