= Uroševina =

Uroševina Урошевина
- Village
- Location within Montenegro
- Coordinates: 42.980513°N 19.582838°E
- Country: Montenegro
- Region: Northern
- Municipality: Mojkovac

Population (2011)
  - Total: 435
- Time zone: UTC+1 (CET)
  - Summer (DST): UTC+2 (CEST)

Uroševina (Montenegrin Cyrillic: Урошевина) is a village in the municipality of Mojkovac, Montenegro.

== Demographics ==
According to the 2011 census, its population was 435.

Ethnicity in 2011
Ethnicity	Number	Percentage
Montenegrins	230	52.9%
Serbs	189	43.4%
other/undeclared	16	3.7%
Total	435	100%
