= Lepenac, Mojkovac =

Lepenac Лепенац
- Village
- Location within Montenegro
- Coordinates: 42.993043°N 19.593029°E
- Country: Montenegro
- Region: Northern
- Municipality: Mojkovac

Population (2011)
  - Total: 382
- Time zone: UTC+1 (CET)
  - Summer (DST): UTC+2 (CEST)

Lepenac (Montenegrin Cyrillic: Лепенац) is a village in the municipality of Mojkovac, Montenegro.

== Demographics ==
According to the 2011 census, its population was 382.

Ethnicity in 2011
Ethnicity	Number	Percentage
Montenegrins	262	68.6%
Serbs	112	29.3%
other/undeclared	8	2.1%
Total	382	100%
