= Bojna Njiva =

- Village
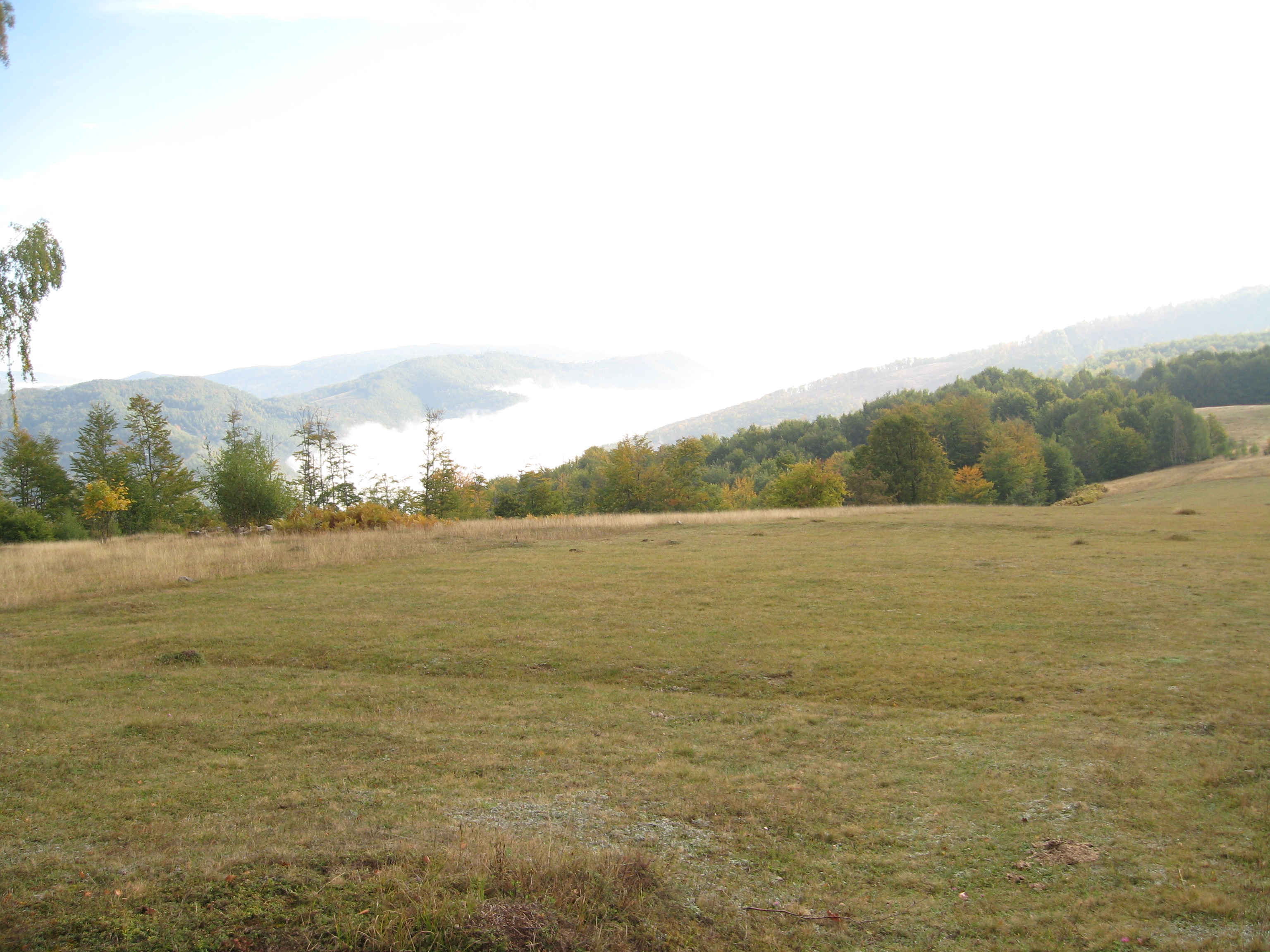
- Bojna Njiva

- Location within Montenegro
- Coordinates: 42.972163°N 19.598791°E
- Country: Montenegro
- Region: Northern
- Municipality: Mojkovac

Population (2011)
  - Total: 300
- Time zone: UTC+1 (CET)
  - Summer (DST): UTC+2 (CEST)

Bojna Njiva (Montenegrin Cyrillic: Бојна Њива) is a village and area in the municipality of Mojkovac, Montenegro.

== Demographics ==
According to the 2011 census, its population was 300.

Ethnicity in 2011
Ethnicity	Number	Percentage
Montenegrins	166	55.3%
Serbs	114	38.0%
other/undeclared	20	6.7%
Total	300	100%
