= Mojkovac =

Town in Northern Montenegro

Mojkovac Мојковац
- Town
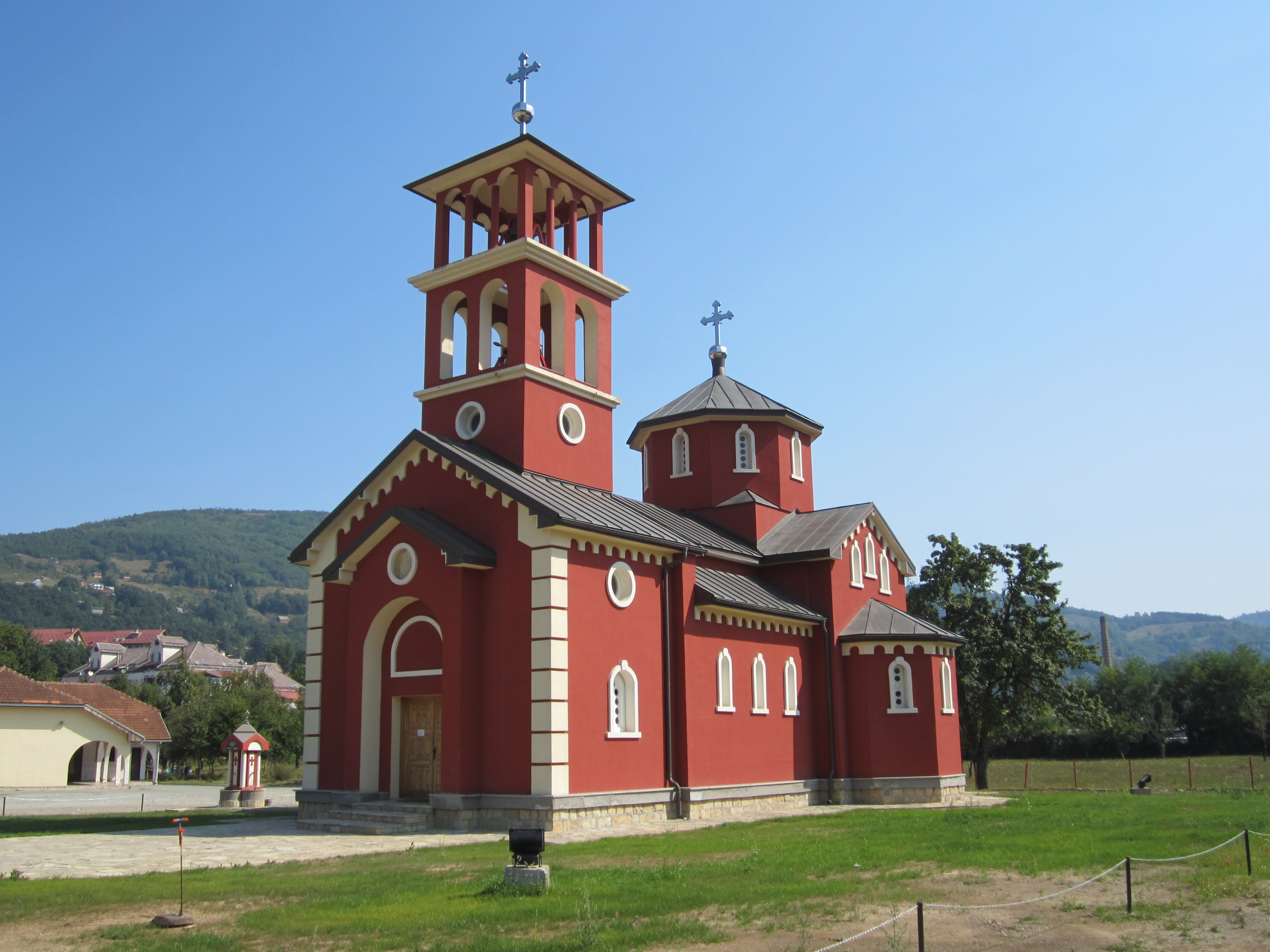
- Church in Mojkovac

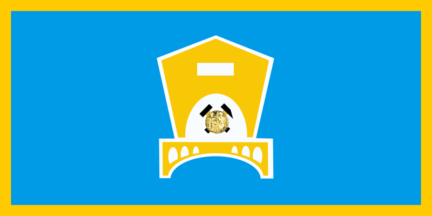
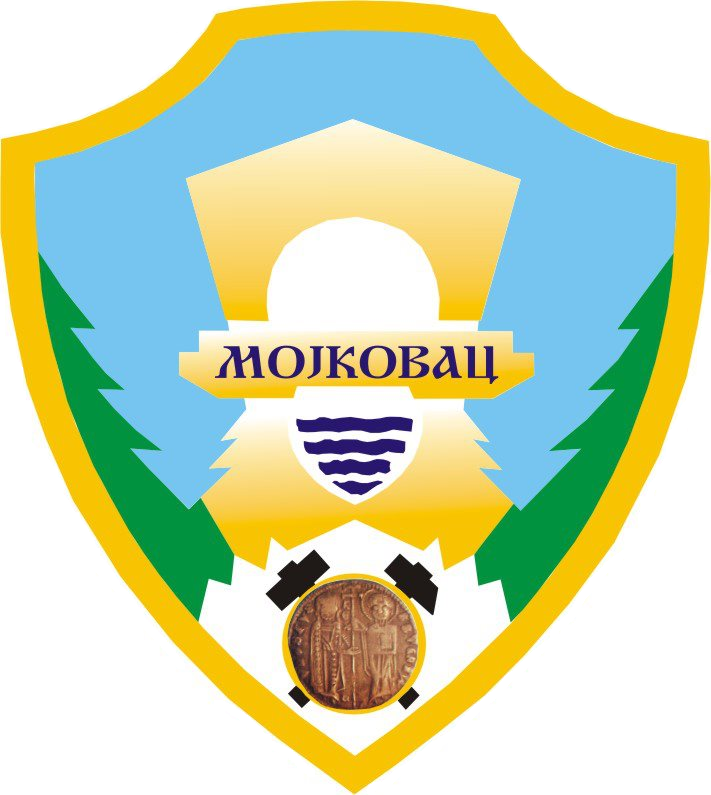
- Flag Coat of arms

- Location within Montenegro
- Coordinates: 42.96°N 19.58°E
- Country: Montenegro
- Region: Northern
- Municipality: Mojkovac
- Settlements: 15

Government
  - Type: Mayor-Assembly
  - Mayor: Vesko Delić (NSD)

Area
  - Town: 367 km^{2} (142 sq mi)

Population (2023 census)
  - Density: 27/km^{2} (70/sq mi)
  - Urban: 2,506 ▼
  - Rural: 4,318 ▼
  - Municipality: 6,824 ▼
- Time zone: UTC+1 (CET)
  - Summer (DST): UTC+2 (CEST)
- Postal code: 84205
- Area code: +382 50
- ISO 3166-2 code: ME-11
- Car plates: MK
- Website: http://mojkovac.me/

Mojkovac (Montenegrin Cyrillic: Мојковац, pronounced [mɔ̌ːjkoʋats]) is a town in Montenegro in the northern region. It has a population of 2,506 (2023 census). Mojkovac is the centre of Mojkovac Municipality, which has a population of 6,824.

== Geography ==
The municipality of Mojkovac covers an area of 367 km^{2} (142 sq mi) and according to the number of inhabitants (10 015 / 2003g) belongs among the smaller municipalities in Montenegro. The city resort is located at an altitude of 853 m (2,799 ft). Its mathematical position is determined by geographical coordinates: the northernmost point is located at 43005 'SGŠ, which is at the same time the lowest point of the municipality, located on the banks of the Tara River; the southernmost point is the Đevojačka glava on Sinjajevina at 42054 'SGŠ; the most eastern point is the Mokro Polje in Bjelasica on the 19040's IGD and the westernmost point is Pećarac peak at Sinjajevina on 19021 IGD. The territory of this municipality borders with municipalities: Kolašin, Šavnik, Žabljak, Bijelo Polje and Berane.

The Municipality of Mojkovac encompasses the extended Tara River valley, which divides the area of the municipality into approximately two equal parts. The Tara valley is a composite character: the gorges, basins and parts of the canyon are scattered. From the gorge, which is located north of the mouth of the Štitarička River, there is a Mojkovac valley, which passes from the Feratovo Polje, through Podbišće, Donje Selo and Mojkovac to the ravine of the Upper and Lower Polje. The total length of the basin is 9 km (5.6 mi), and the width is 2.5 km (1.6 mi). In the canyon part of Tara, which belongs to the municipality of Mojkovac, larger extensions are around the mouth of Bistrica, Ravnik (3.3 km × 2.5 km (2.1 mi × 1.6 mi)) and around Gornja Dobrilovina and black black pine forest in Crni Podim. Four kilometers north of Mojkovac is the passage of the Strait (1,007 m (3,304 ft)), through which it enters the expanded and well populated Leposnica Valley, the tributaries of Lim.

In Mojkovac, a moderate continental climate predominates, which is quite similar to Kolašin's climate. A hydrometeorological station has recently been set up in Mojkovac, so the future monitoring of climatic data will be more precise. The shield averages 1,889 mm of rainfall annually, Mojkovac 1,664 mm, and Lower Dobrilovina 1,121 mm. The number of snow days per year is around 120, and the height of the snow cover reaches 150 cm, and in the mountains it is much more.

== Economy ==
Out of the total area of the Municipality of Mojkovac (367 km^{2} (142 sq mi)), 169.5 km^{2} (65.4 sq mi) or 46.2% is forests, 129.91 km^{2} (50.16 sq mi) or 35.4% is arable land, and 67.2 km^{2} (25.9 sq mi) or 18.4% is non-cultivated area.

Since the collapse of Brskovo (at the end of the 14th century), the inhabitants of Mojkovac region mostly dealt with agriculture. There was livestock breeding, and in the mountainous regions to this day, the primary economic branch remained. It was based on spacious mountain pastures. Mount Sinjajevina, with a land area of 120,000 ha in which 200,000 sheep can be planted, is one of the richest pasture cattle mountains in the Balkans.

Farming evolved alongside livestock. It takes place on small rural farms running along the left and right banks of the Tara River. They include potato, cabbage, beans, harbors and other continental vegetable crops, and most of the fruits are predominantly of plum, apple, pear, walnut and the like. The fact that 46.2% of the total territory is covered by forests speaks enough about the great wood resources that this municipality has. The forests of willow, oak, birch, beech, then fir, spruce, pine, and pestilence range from the Tara River to the foot of the largest mountain peaks. Uncontrolled logging and exploitation threatens the forest wealth of this region.

The economic development of the Mojkovo region after the Second World War was based on mining, wood and machinery industries.

After more than six centuries in 1966, the Brskovo mine was opened, from which the exploitation of lead and zinc ore will be exploited until the end of the 1980s, when it is closed. In 1951 KD "Vukman Kruščić", which in that period represented the center of the wood industry of Montenegro, started operating in Mojkovac. The head of the machine industry in this region is the factories "Tara-Precision" and "Tara-Aerospace".

=== City Assembly (2021–2025) ===
The municipal parliament consists of 31 deputies elected directly for a four-year term.

| Party / Coalition | Seats | Local government |
|---|---|---|
| DPS | 13 / 31 | Opposition |
| ZBCG (NSD–DNP) | 4 / 31 | Government |
| DCG | 4 / 31 | Government |
| SNP | 3 / 31 | Government |
| PES | 2 / 31 | Government |
| URA | 2 / 31 | Government |
| UCG | 1 / 31 | Government |
| PzP | 1 / 31 | Government |
| SD | 1 / 31 | Opposition |

== Sports ==
Local football team is Brskovo, which spent a season in the country's second tier, playing home games at the Gradski stadion.

== Transport connections ==
Mojkovac Town has a station on Belgrade–Bar railway. It is also at the intersection of the main road connecting Montenegro's coast and Podgorica with northern Montenegro and Serbia (E65, E80), and the road leading towards Žabljak and Pljevlja. Mojkovac is on the east/right bank of the Tara River, between the mountains of Bjelasica and Sinjajevina. The old mining village of Brskovo is nearby. Brskovo is one of the oldest mines in the region. Podgorica Airport is 105 km (65 mi) away, and has regular flights to major European destinations.

== Notable people and events ==
Mojkovac is known for being the location of the eponymous Battle of Mojkovac. It is also known as the birthplace of the following people:

- Stefan Savić, footballer
- Miodrag Božović, footballer
- Zoran Simović, footballer
- Darko Stanić, handball player
- Milovan Djilas, politician and writer
- Duško Marković, politician
- Danijel Furtula, discus thrower
