= Prošćenje =

Prošćenje Прошћење
- Village
- Location within Montenegro
- Coordinates: 42.999426°N 19.493558°E
- Country: Montenegro
- Region: Northern
- Municipality: Mojkovac

Population (2011)
  - Total: 579
- Time zone: UTC+1 (CET)
  - Summer (DST): UTC+2 (CEST)

Prošćenje (Montenegrin Cyrillic: Прошћење) is a village in the municipality of Mojkovac, Montenegro.

== Demographics ==
According to the 2011 census, its population was 579.

Ethnicity in 2011
Ethnicity	Number	Percentage
Montenegrins	296	51.1%
Serbs	252	43.5%
other/undeclared	31	5.4%
Total	579	100%
