= Stevanovac =

Stevanovac Стевановац
- Village
- Location within Montenegro
- Coordinates: 42.990264°N 19.546513°E
- Country: Montenegro
- Region: Northern
- Municipality: Mojkovac

Population (2011)
  - Total: 190
- Time zone: UTC+1 (CET)
  - Summer (DST): UTC+2 (CEST)

Stevanovac (Montenegrin Cyrillic: Стевановац) is a village in the municipality of Mojkovac, Montenegro.

== Demographics ==
According to the 2011 census, its population was 190.

Ethnicity in 2011
| Ethnicity | Number | Percentage |
|---|---|---|
| Serbs | 95 | 50.0% |
| Montenegrins | 85 | 44.7% |
| other/undeclared | 10 | 5.3% |
| Total | 190 | 100% |
