= Žari =

Žari Жари
- Village
- Location within Montenegro
- Coordinates: 43.007257°N 19.612900°E
- Country: Montenegro
- Region: Northern
- Municipality: Mojkovac

Population (2011)
  - Total: 301
- Time zone: UTC+1 (CET)
  - Summer (DST): UTC+2 (CEST)

Žari (Montenegrin Cyrillic: Жари) is a village in the municipality of Mojkovac, Montenegro.

== Demographics ==
According to the 2011 census, its population was 301.

Ethnicity in 2011
Ethnicity	Number	Percentage
Serbs	144	47.8%
Montenegrins	142	47.2%
other/undeclared	15	5.0%
Total	301	100%
