= Blažova pećina =

Cave in Montenegro

Blažova pećina (Blaž cave) is a small karst cave located on the Sinjajevina mountain in central Montenegro. It is notable for its unique biodiversity, including being the habitat for the endemic blind cave beetle Anthroherpon sinjajevina.

== Location and Description ==
The cave is situated near the village of Rudanci, at an elevation of about 1,467 m (4,813 ft) above sea level. It is formed within the limestone bedrock characteristic of the Dinaric Alps karst region. It is a small and simple cave, consisting of two chambers divided by a 9 m (30 ft) deep vertical section.

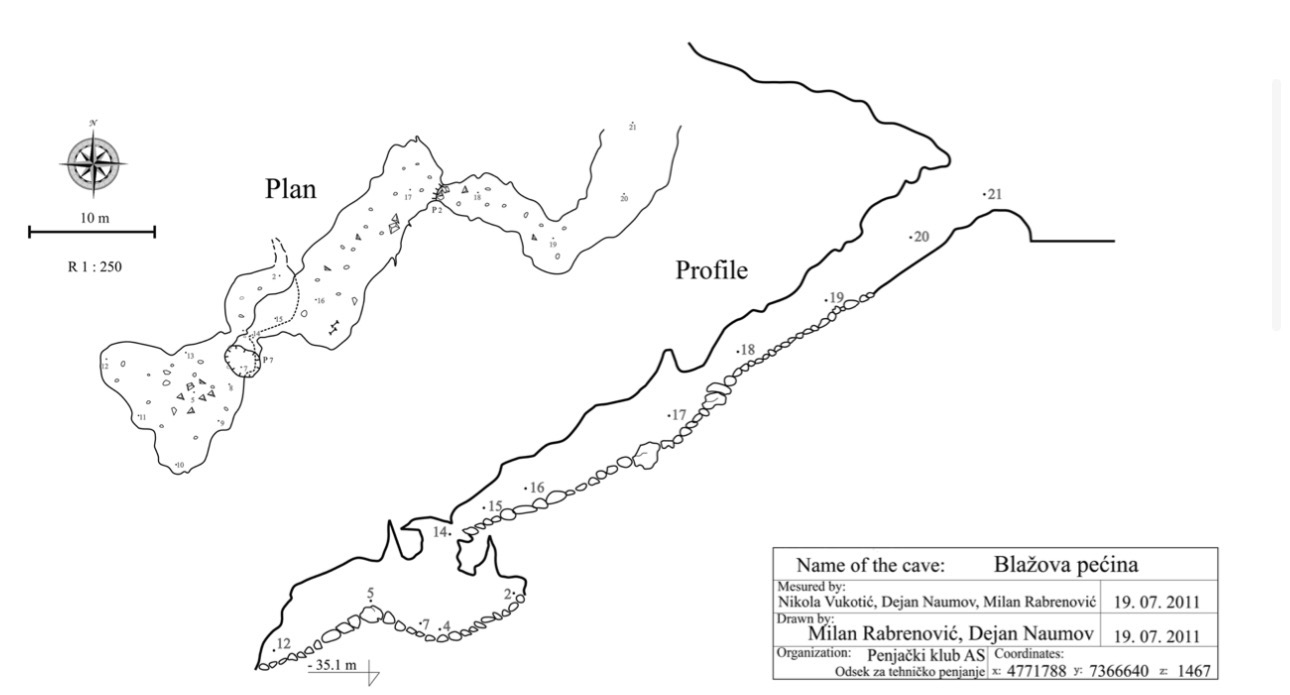
Blažova pećina Map

== Biodiversity ==
Blažova pećina is the type locality for the endemic, cave-dwelling beetle Anthroherpon sinjajevina, a species belonging to the family Leiodidae.
