= Battle of Kolašin =

1858 Ottoman Wars conflict in Montenegro

- Part of the Ottoman wars in Europe
Date	28 July 1858
Location	Kolašin
Result	Montenegrin victory

Belligerents
Principality of Montenegro	Ottoman Empire

Commanders and leaders
Novica Cerović; Miljan Vešović	Unknown

Strength
~5,000	Unknown

The Battle of Kolašin (Serbian: Bitka kod Kolašina) took place on July 28, 1858 between the Principality of Montenegro and the Ottoman Empire near Kolašin. The Montenegrin army was composed of 5,000 tribesmen from the Vasojevići, Morača, Rovca, Drobnjaci, Uskoci and Kuči. The Montenegrin army burnt all of the Turkish katuns on the Sinjajevina mountain, and razed the villages of Trebaljevo, Lipovo and Štitarica.

The attack on Kolašin caused numerous political problems and diplomatic complications, which would later become known as the "Kolašin Affair" (Serbian: Kolašinska afera). Disagreements were put aside with the engagement of diplomatic representatives of the Great Powers, who showed a great interest in the situation occurring in the Balkans. There are some disputes as to whether the attack was authorised by Montenegrin government. Prince Danilo was unaware of it, although there are some indications that his brother, the Grand Duke Mirko, might have allowed it. Tradition has it that the attack was the result of an agreement between the voivodes of the Drobnjaci and the Vasojevići, Novica Cerović and Miljan Vukov, with aim to avenge the death of Miljan's brother Đorđije who was killed in ambush laid by Kolašin's Muslims. The archimandrite of Morača, Dimitrije Radojević, supported the plan and proved to be a key figure in mobilising the remaining tribes to act. The town was almost completely destroyed during attack. As a result, Duke Miljan was questioned by international commission in Dubrovnik and acquitted while Duke Novica took refuge in Boka Kotorska for a while. Although unsatisfied with Dukes acting on their own, Prince Danilo later commemorated the participants by erecting a bridge over Mrtvica river in their honor.
