= Zminičko Lake =

Glacial lake in Montenegro

- Zminičko Jezero / Зминичко језеро (Serbo-Croatian)
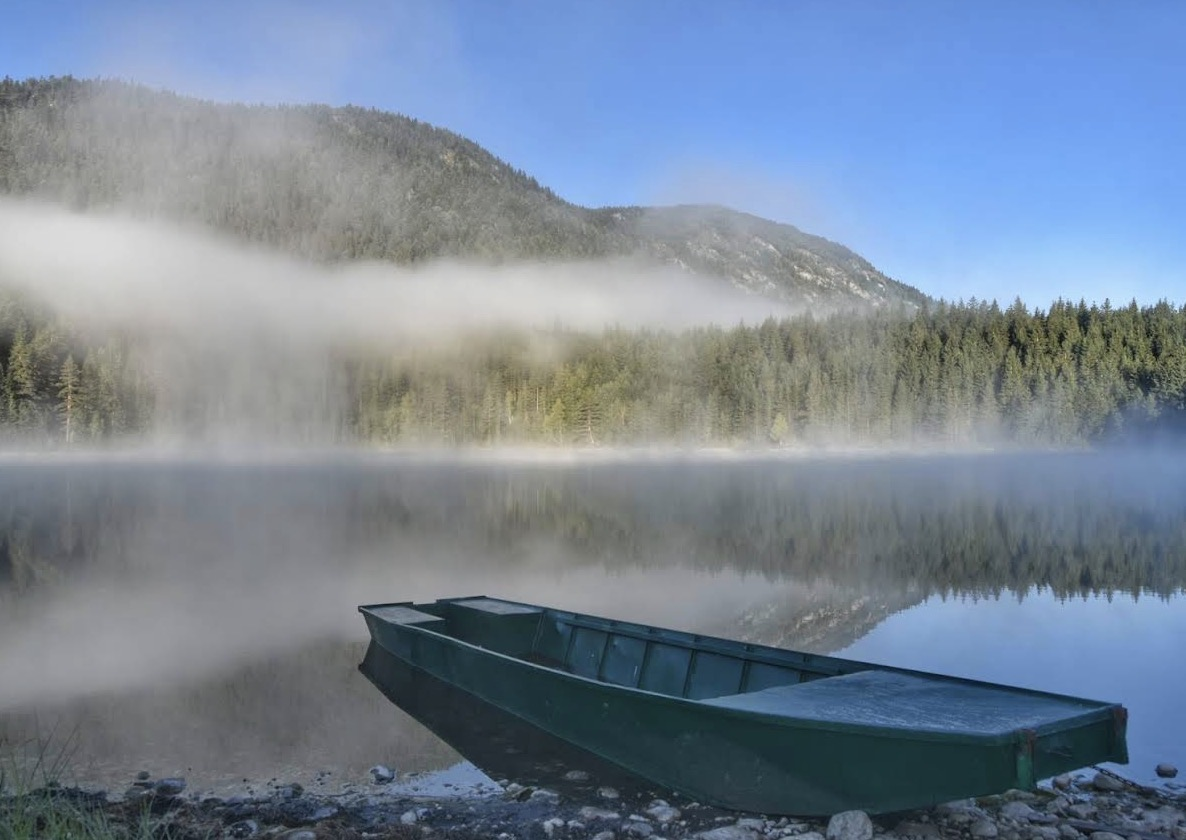
- Location on Sinjajevina mountain
- Location: Sinjajevina mountain, Montenegro
- Coordinates: 43.1010656°N 19.2469214°E
- Type: Glacial
- Primary inflows: Precipitation and minor springs
- Primary outflows: Infiltration (sinking) and evaporation
- Basin countries: Montenegro
- Max. length: 280 m (920 ft)
- Max. width: 240 m (790 ft)
- Surface area: 40,000 to 45,000 m^{2} (430,000 to 480,000 sq ft)
- Max. depth: 3.8 m (12 ft)
- Water volume: c. 40,000 m^{3} (1,400,000 cu ft)
- Surface elevation: 1,285 m (4,216 ft)

Zminičko Lake (Serbo-Croatian: Zminičko jezero / Зминичко језеро) is a glacial lake situated on the northern periphery of the Sinjajevina mountain massif in Montenegro. While often mistakenly grouped with the lakes of the nearby Durmitor National Park, it is located at the point where the slopes of Sinjajevina's branches, Kučajevica and Šarigora. It is named after the village of Zminica where it is located.

== Geography and formation ==
Zminičko Lake is located at an altitude of 1,285 meters above sea level. It is approximately 12 km from the town of Žabljak and is easily accessible, with a macadam road passing nearby from the direction of Njegovuđe. The lake was formed by water accumulation in a valley section dammed by a 26-meters-high morainic ridge.

It has an irregular elliptical shape, measuring 280 meters in length and 240 meters in width. Its surface area varies between 40,000 and 45,000 m² depending on water level, and the summer shoreline is approximately 780 meters long. The lake is shallow, with depths in the wide coastal zone not exceeding 0.3 to 0.7 meters, gradually increasing towards the central part where the maximum depth of 3.8 meters is found. The lake bottom is largely flat and covered with silt and water is greenish-yellow with low transparency (up to 2 meters). Water temperatures can exceed 22 °C in summer, while in winter the lake freezes over.

== Hydrology ==
The lake is fed primarily by precipitation, estimated at about 60,000 m³ annually from an approximate 1,500 mm of rainfall. Water is lost through evaporation and, predominantly, through infiltration (sinking). A ponor (sinkhole) is located under the limestone cliff of Kučajevica at the southern part of the lake, which had a discharge of 5 liters per second in July 1970. The annual water level fluctuation (amplituda) is estimated to be 80–110 cm. There is also a small spring on the opposite side of the moraine dam from the lake, with a discharge of 3 liters per minute, believed to be fed by water seeping through the moraine material from the lake.

== Ecology and use ==
The lake is characterized by lush aquatic vegetation and is an important watering hole for livestock grazing in the surrounding areas of Sinjajevina and Durmitor during the summer. It is also noted for having a great abundance of different kinds of wild ducks. The lake is in a late stage of evolution, threatened by siltation and erosion from a torrential tributary.
