= List of regions of Montenegro by Human Development Index =

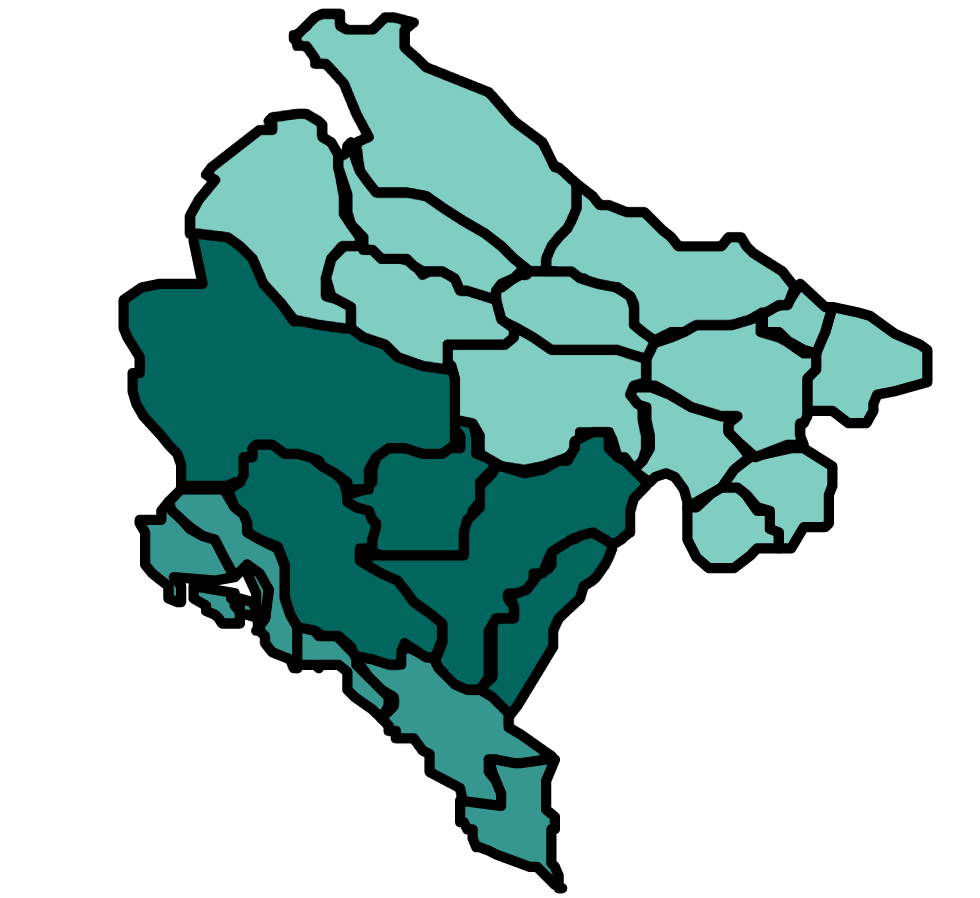
Regions of Montenegro by HDI in 2018 0.829 0.818 0.791

This is a list of regions of Montenegro by Human Development Index as of 2024 with data for the year 2023.

Rank	Region (Municipalities of Montenegro)	HDI (2023)
Very high human development
1	Central Montenegro (Niksic, Cetinje, Danilovgrad, Podgorica, Tuzi)	0.871
-	Montenegro (average)	0.862
2	Northern Montenegro (Plužine, Šavnik, Žabljak, Mojkovac, Kolašin, Berane, Andrijevica, Gusinje, Plav, Pljevlja, Bijelo Polje, Petnjica, Rožaje)	0.856
3	Coastal Montenegro (Herceg Novi, Tivat, Kotor, Budva, Bar, Ulcinj)	0.844
