= Štitarica =

Štitarica Штитарица
- Village
- Location within Montenegro
- Coordinates: 42.925333°N 19.542844°E
- Country: Montenegro
- Region: Northern
- Municipality: Mojkovac

Population (2011)
  - Total: 233
- Time zone: UTC+1 (CET)
  - Summer (DST): UTC+2 (CEST)

Štitarica (Serbian Cyrillic: Штитарица) is a village in the municipality of Mojkovac, Montenegro.

== Demographics ==
According to the 2011 census, its population was 233.

Ethnicity in 2011
Ethnicity	Number	Percentage
Montenegrins	149	63.9%
Serbs	80	34.3%
other/undeclared	4	1.7%
Total	233	100%
