= Ropojana Valley =

Glacial valley in Prokletije, Montenegro

- Ропојанска Долина (Serbo-Croatian); Luginë e Ropojanës (Albanian)
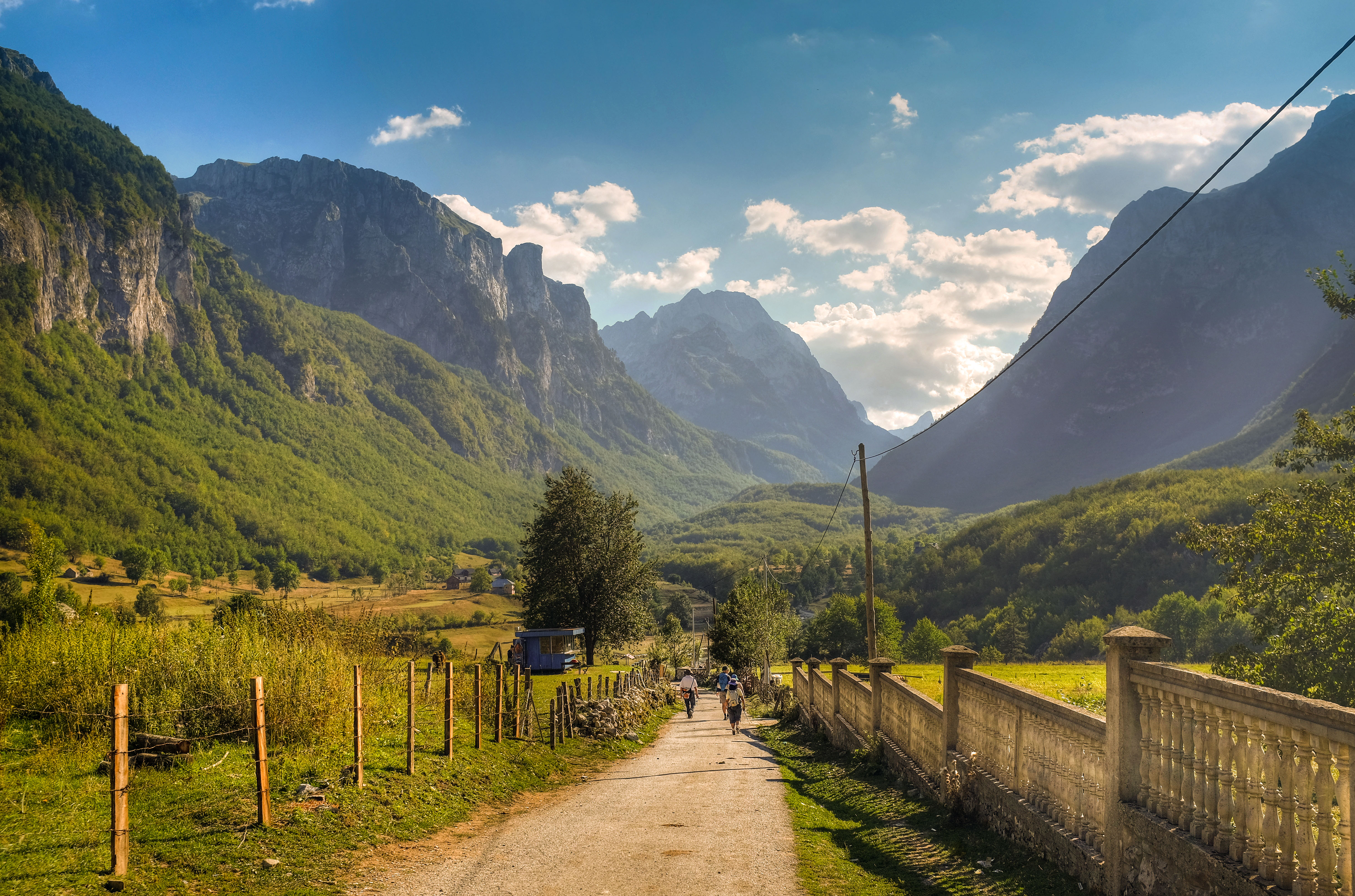
- View of the Ropojana Valley
- Length: c. 12.5 km (7.8 mi) North-South

Geology
- Type: U-shaped valley
- Age: Pleistocene

Geography
- Location: Gusinje Municipality, Montenegro
- Coordinates: 42°30′7″N 19°48′57″E
- Rivers: Vruja (Grlja, Skakavica) River

Location
- Interactive map of the valley

Ropojana Valley (Serbo-Croatian:Ропojанска Долина; Albanian: Luginë e Ropojanës) is a long glacial (U-shaped) valley in the Prokletije National Park in northeastern Montenegro, within Gusinje Municipality. The valley extends in a north–south direction from near the town of Gusinje to the border with Albania, where it is terminated by Lake Ropojana.

== Geography and geology ==
It is a U-shaped valley carved by Pleistocene glacial activity and situated in the central part of the Prokletije mountain range with the western part (including Ropojana) composed primarily of Mesozoic limestones and dolomitic limestones. During the Pleistocene, the Ropojana Glacier was the longest glacier in the Prokletije, with an estimated length of about 12.5 km and a surface area of 20 km^{2}. The glacier originated from the great cirques (Buni i Jezerces and Buni i Gropavet) below the peak Maja e Jezercës and flowed northwards. Its lowest frontal moraine is located in the village of Vusanje at an altitude of about 1,150 meters above sea level. Previously, it was erroneously believed that the glacier extended much further to deposits near Plav Lake, which have since been identified as an alluvial fan from a different source.

The valley is drained by the Vruja River, which is a headwater of the Lim.

== Tourism and access ==
Ropojana Valley one of the main destinations within Prokletije National Park with access typically from the town of Gusinje. A paved road leads to the village of Vusanje, where a macadam road continues into the valley. The route is popular for hiking and mountain biking, forming part of the Peaks of the Balkans trail network. Key attractions include the Grlja Waterfall near the start of the trail, the Eye of the Grasshopper spring about 1 km in, and Lake Ropojana at the end of the valley, approximately 7 km from Vusanje.

== Biodiversity ==
An endemic fungus, Cenangiopsis raghavanii, was described from the valley in 2015.

== See also ==
- Accursed Mointains
- Gusinje
- Plav
