= Cenangiopsis raghavanii =

Scientific classification
- Kingdom: Fungi
- Division: Ascomycota
- Class: Leotiomycetes
- Order: Helotiales
- Family: Helotiaceae
- Genus: Cenangiopsis
- Species: C. raghavanii

Binomial name
- Cenangiopsis raghavanii B.Perić, 2015

Species of fungus

Cenangiopsis raghavanii is a species of fungus in the family Helotiaceae found in Montenegro.

== Taxonomy ==
The species was formally described in 2015 by Montenegrin mycologist Branislav Perić and colleagues. The holotype was collected in Ropojana Valley, within Prokletije National Park, Montenegro, in May 2014. The specific epithet raghavanii honors Raghavan Ramankutty.

== Description ==
Apothecia: The apothecia are 0.5–1.5 mm in diameter, erumpent (breaking through the bark), and sessile (lacking a stipe). They are initially closed and globular, later opening to become bowl-shaped with an inward-rolled margin. The hymenium is concave and greyish-brownish. The exterior and margin are floccose to downy, colored greenish-bluish to brownish.

Asci: The asci measure 50–74 × 5–6 μm, are 8-spored, and feature a euamyloid apical ring of the Calycina-type. They arise from croziers.

Ascospores: The ascospores are (6–)6.3–8(–9) × 1.8–2.6 μm, smooth, hyaline, and cylindrical-ellipsoid. They contain 2–4 small oil drops. Overmature spores become dark brown, ellipsoid to subglobose.

Paraphyses: The paraphyses are lanceolate and strongly protrude beyond the asci. They contain large, elongate, hyaline to pale olive refractive vacuoles.

Microscopic anatomy: The medullary excipulum is composed of hyaline or light olive textura intricata. The ectal excipulum is of vertically oriented textura globulosa to -prismatica, light brown, with dark brown cortical regions. Marginal hairs are ~50–70 × 5.5–7.5 μm and covered in crystalloid warts. Abundant crystals are present in both the ectal and medullary excipulum. The apothecia show a faint reddish-brownish ionomidotic reaction in KOH.

== Distribution ==
This fungus is so far known only from its type locality in Montenegro. The holotype was collected in the Ropojana valley, Prokletije National Park, at an altitude of 1,195 m.

== Habitat ==
Its habitat is the bark of periodically dry, corticated twigs and branches (3–10 mm thick) of Juniperus communis (common juniper) in a high montane forest environment. The substrate is calcareous. It is associated with other fungi including Cenangiopsis junipericola, Colpoma juniperi, and Holmiella sabina.
