= Njegovuđa =

Njegovuđa Његовуђа
- Village
- Location within Montenegro
- Coordinates: 43°07′21″N 19°13′13″E
- Country: Montenegro
- Region: Northern
- Municipality: Žabljak
- Elevation: 4,268 ft (1,301 m)

Population (2011)
  - Total: 216
- Time zone: UTC+1 (CET)
  - Summer (DST): UTC+2 (CEST)
- Postal code: 84224
- Area code: +382 52
- Vehicle registration: ŽB

Njegovuđa (Montenegrin Cyrillic: Његовуђа, pronounced [ɲêɡoʋudʑa]) is a village in the municipality of Žabljak, Montenegro.

== Demographics ==
According to the 2003 census, the town had a population of 227 people.

According to the 2011 census, its population was 216.

Historical population
| Year | Pop. | ±% |
|---|---|---|
| 1948 | 67 | — |
| 1953 | 146 | +117.9% |
| 1961 | 210 | +43.8% |
| 1971 | 299 | +42.4% |
| 1981 | 264 | −11.7% |
| 1991 | 288 | +9.1% |
| 2003 | 227 | −21.2% |
| 2003 | 216 | −4.8% |

Ethnicity in 2011

| Ethnicity | Number | Percentage |
|---|---|---|
| Montenegrins | 108 | 50.0% |
| Serbs | 93 | 43.1% |
| other/undeclared | 15 | 6.9% |
| Total | 227 | 100% |
