= Saxons in medieval Serbia =

Saxons, known as Sasi (Serbian Cyrillic: Саси), migrated to medieval Serbia in the mid-13th century from Hungary. Serbia's mines were developed by the community.

The earliest mention of Saxons in Serbia is from 1253–54, which shows them as an established community. These Saxons, or Sasi, had settled the Kingdom of Serbia during the reign of Stefan Uroš I (r. 1243–1276), from the Kingdom of Hungary. Under Stefan Uroš I, Serbia became a significant power in the Balkans, partly due to economic development through opening of mines. The mines were developed by the Sasi, who were experienced in the extracting of ore. Their settlements, located by the mines, had privileged status – they lived under their own laws and were allowed to adhere to Catholicism and build their churches.

Mines included Brskovo, Novo Brdo, and others.

== Legacy ==
The villages of Šašare and Sase, Srebrenica, and the Saška reka was named after the community.

Also, the settlement of Šaškovac near the town of Pristina in Kosovo is named after the Saxons. Mines as well as Novo Brdo were located in the immediate vicinity.

== See also ==
- Vlachs in medieval Serbia

== Sources ==
- Fine, John Van Antwerp (1994), The Late Medieval Balkans: A Critical Survey from the Late Twelfth Century to the Ottoman Conquest, Ann Arbor: University of Michigan Press, ISBN 978-0-472-08260-5
- Takács, Miklós. "Sächsische Bergleute im mittelalterlichen Serbien und die" sächsische Kirche" von Novo Brdo." Südost Forschungen 50 (1991): 31-60.
- Katančević, Andreja. "Da li su Sasi imali privilegije u mešovitim sporovima u srednjovekovnoj Srbiji?." Anali Pravnog fakulteta u Beogradu-Časopis za pravne i društvene nauke 63.2 (2016).
