= Lake Ropojana =

Lake in Montenegro and Albania

- Ropojansko jezero (Montenegrin); Liqeni i Gjeshtarës (Albanian)
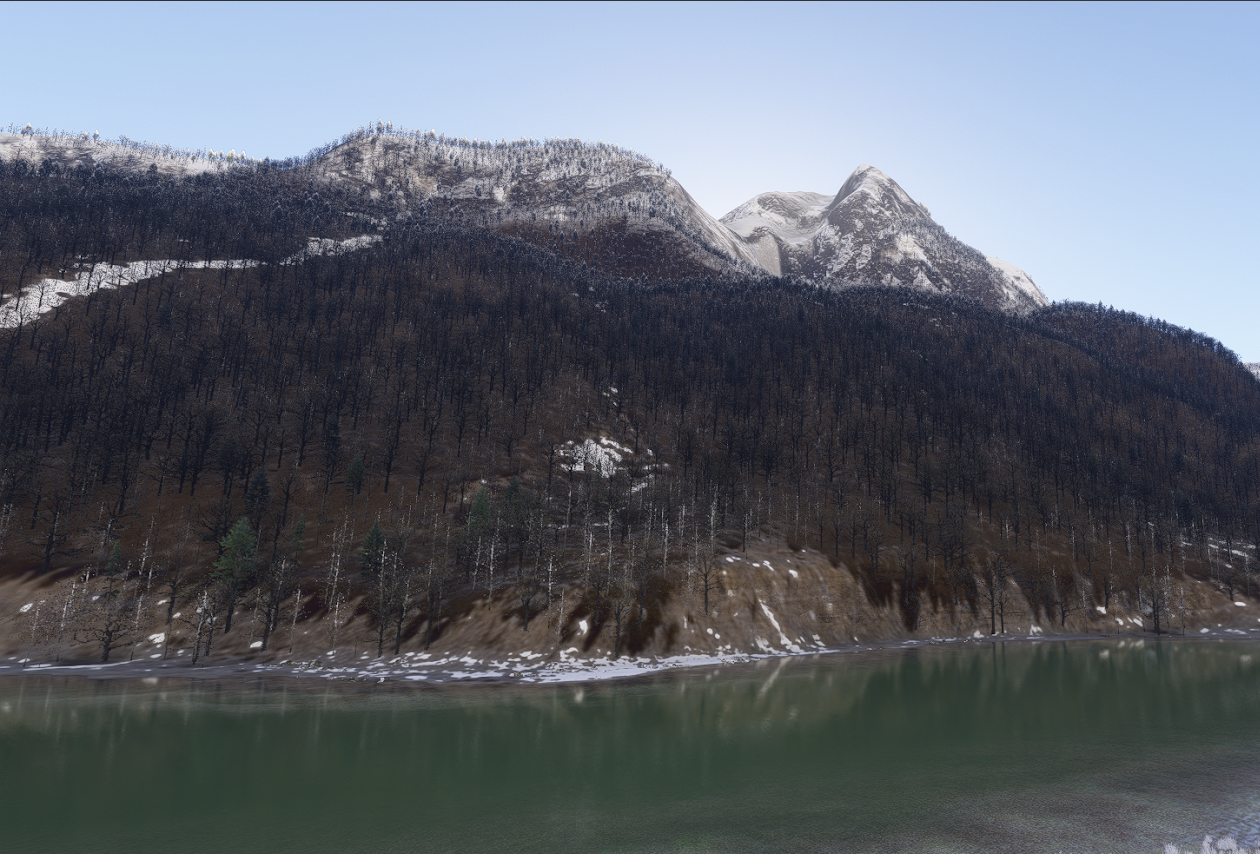
- Lake Ropojana in winter
- Interactive map of the valley
- Location: Ropojana Valley, Prokletije Mountains
- Coordinates: 42.4848435°N 19.7941208°E
- Type: Glacial lake
- Basin countries: Montenegro, Albania

Lake Ropojana (Montenegrin: Ропоjанско Jезеро romanized: Ropojansko Jezero; Albanian: Liqeni i Gjeshtarës) is a periodic glacial lake located in the Ropojana Valley within the Prokletje (Accursed Mountains) on the border between Montenegro and Albania.

== Geography ==
Lake Ropojana is situated at the end of the Ropojana Valley near the border of Albania. The lake's water source is exclusively melting snow and seasonal precipitation, which causes its water level and presence to fluctuate dramatically throughout the year. Typically, the lake is visible at the beginning of summer but dries up completely, becoming a grassy meadow, by the end of summer (August/September). Exceptionally wet years with abundant rainfall can prolong the lake's presence into July.

The lake lies within a region shaped by extensive Pleistocene glaciation. The Ropojana Valley was carved by the Ropojana glacier, which was the longest Pleistocene glacier in the central Prokletije, extending approximately 12.5 km and covering an area of 20 km² during its maximum extent.

== Tourism ==
It is a notable point on the Peaks of the Balkans long-distance hiking trail, specifically on the route between Ropojansko Jezero and Qafa e Pejës.

The lake is accessible from the village of Vusanje in the Gusinje Municipality of Montenegro. Visitors can reach it via a macadam road, either by hiking for about one hour from just outside Vusanje or by using a 4x4 vehicle.
