= Gradski stadion (Mojkovac) =

Football stadium in Mojkovac, Montenegro

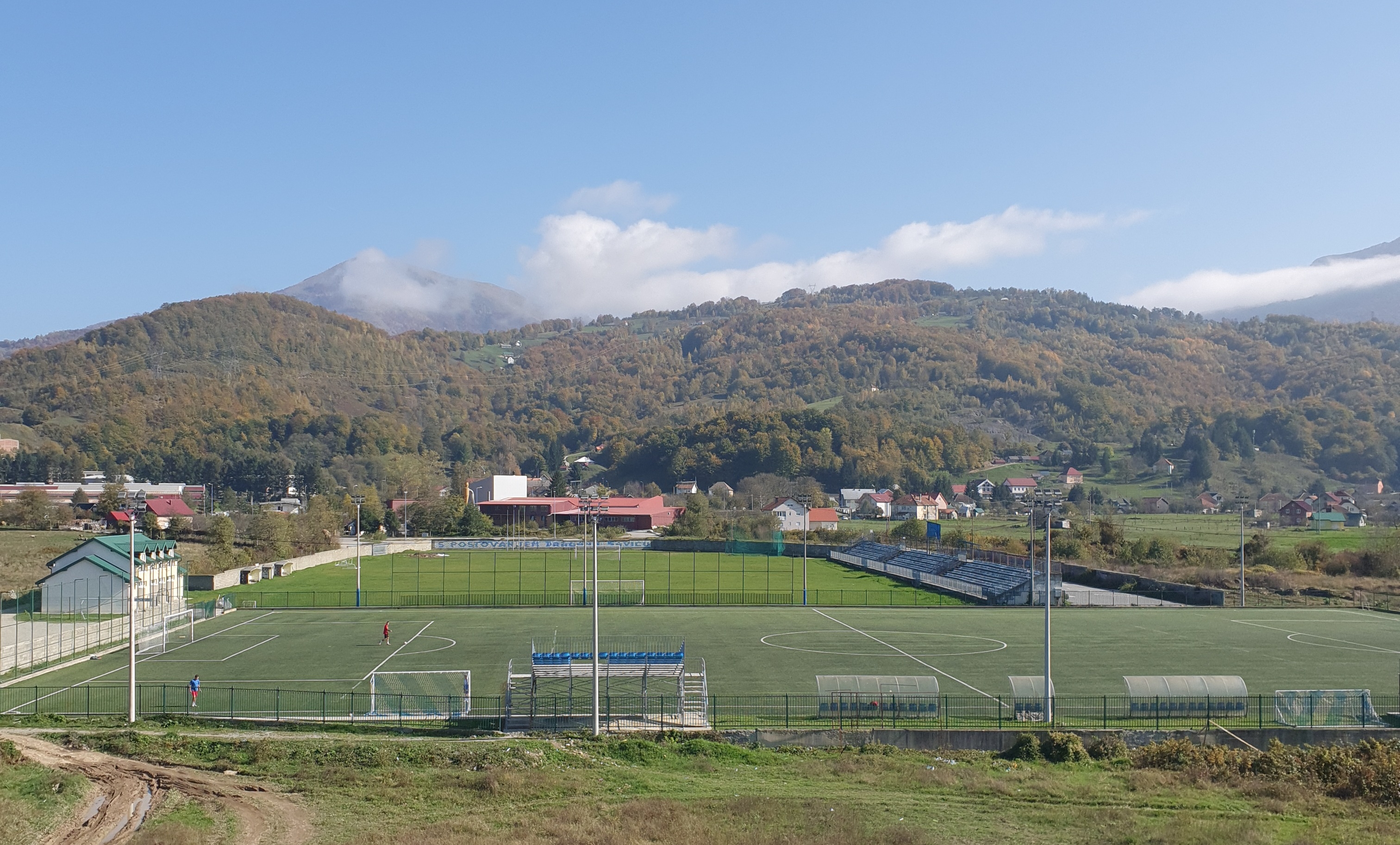
- Interactive map of Gradski stadion
- Full name: Gradski stadion Mojkovac
- Location: Mojkovac, Montenegro
- Coordinates: 42.956463°N 19.580249°E
- Owner: City of Mojkovac
- Capacity: 1,500
- Surface: grass
- Field size: 110 x 62 m

Construction
- Expanded: 2009

Tenant
- FK Brskovo

Gradski stadion is a football stadium in Mojkovac, Montenegro. It is situated on the Tara riverbank. It is used for football matches. The stadium is the home ground of FK Brskovo.

== History ==
On the site of a prior football stadium built after World War II, Gradski stadion was constructed in 2009 with a capacity of 1,500 seats. It is the home of FK Brskovo and the host of Interregional Sport Games (MOSI) 2009.

== Pitch and conditions ==
The pitch measures 110 x 62 meters. The stadium does not meet UEFA criteria for European competitions.
There is one additional field near the main ground, used for training and youth-league games.

== See also ==
- FK Brskovo
- Mojkovac
