= Biogradska Gora =

Forest and national park in Montenegro

Biogradska Gora National Park
- IUCN category II (national park)
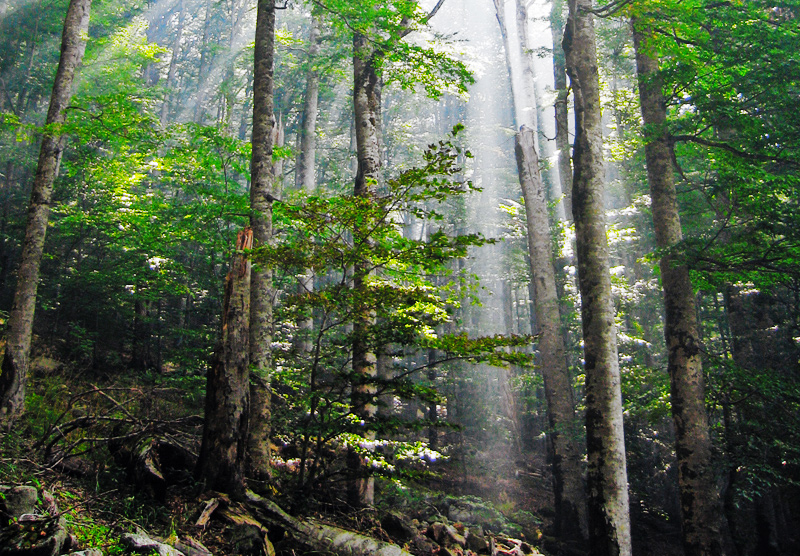
- Virgin beech forest in Biogradska Gora
- Interactive map of Biogradska Gora National Park
- Location: Montenegro
- Nearest city: Kolašin
- Coordinates: 42°53′53″N 19°36′07″E
- Area: 54 km^{2} (21 sq mi)
- Established: 1952

Biogradska Gora (Montenegrin: Биоградска Гора, pronounced [bîoɡradskaː ɡǒra]) is a forest and a national park in Montenegro within the Kolašin Municipality that is recognized as one of the UNESCO World Network of Biosphere Reserves. The landscape is one of mountain ridges, glacial lakes, and temperate forest.

== Location ==
Biogradska Gora is located in the mountainous region of Bjelasica in the central part of Montenegro between the rivers Tara and Lim, and is surrounded by three municipalities: Kolašin, Berane and Mojkovac. It is the most northeasterly of the five national parks in Montenegro.

== Biogradska Gora National Park ==
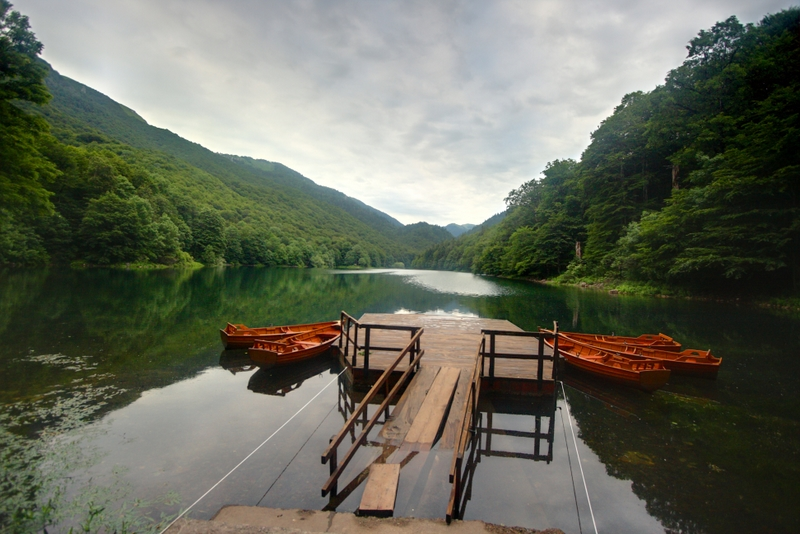
Biogradsko lake

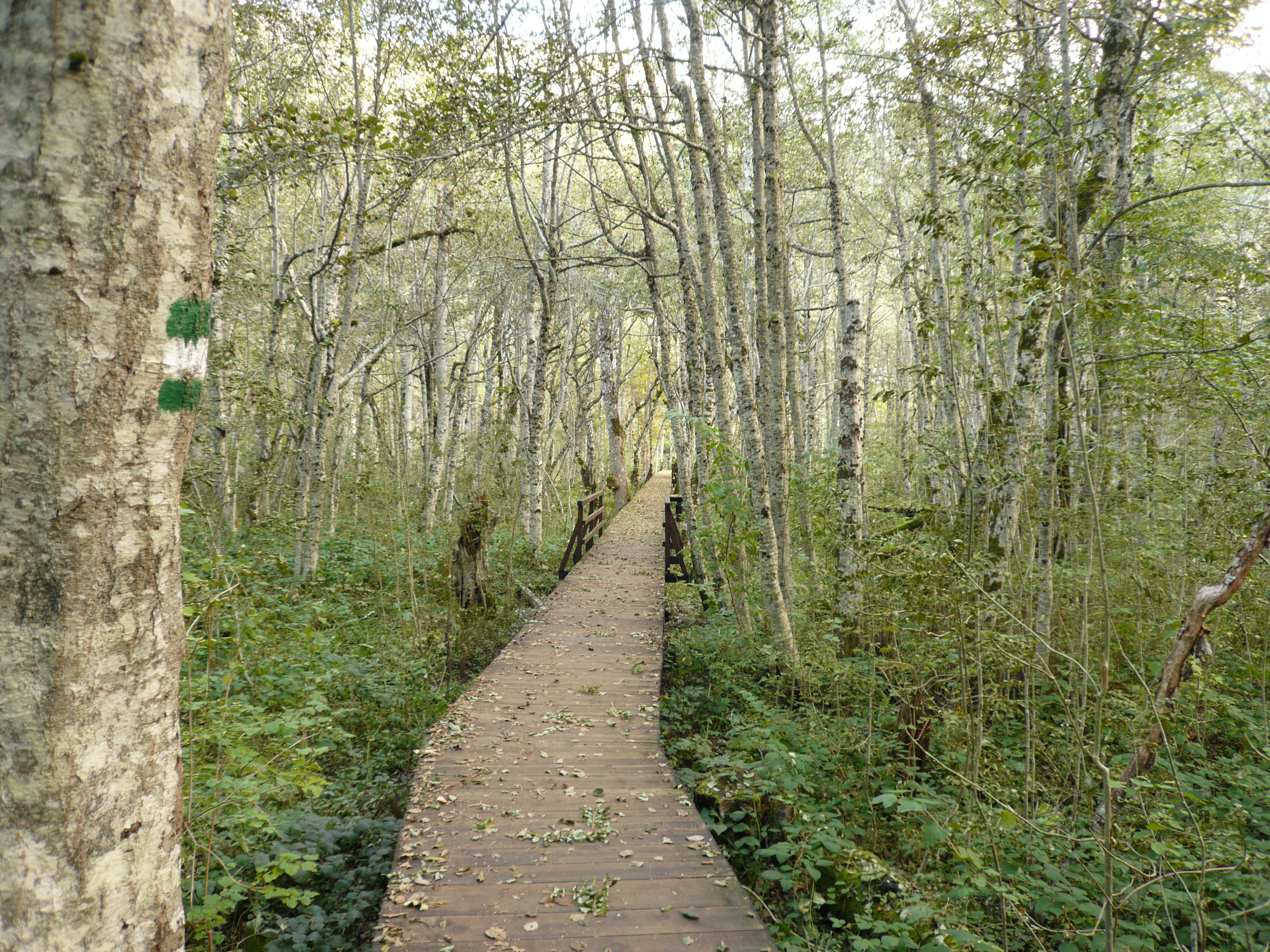
Walking path around the lake

The National Park is 54 km² in area. Basic elements of the Park are: untouched forest, large mountain slopes and tops over 2,000 meters high, six glacial lakes, five at an altitude of 1,820 meters and one easily accessible low land lake (Šiško, Mali Šiško, Ursulovačko, Pešica, and Ševarina) located at the very entrance to the park, Biogradsko Lake.

Swift streams cut through scenery of Biogradska Gora, green pastures and clear lakes reflecting centennial forests. The Park is renowned as a unique geomorphological region and, as such, it is attractive for scientific research. The seat of the park is in Kolašin. The national park abounds in cultural and historic heritage consisting of sacral monuments national building and archeological localities. Numerous authentic buildings of traditional architecture are found throughout the pastures and villages next to the virgin forest reserve on the Bjelasica mountain range.

=== Exploring the park ===
The park, between Mojkovac and Kolasin, is accessible by car via Highway E65 or by bus from Podgorica or Bijelo Polje. The park has developed infrastructure for tourists, including a visitors center, hiking trails, campsites, and a restaurant. Visitors have several options in addition to hiking, mountain biking, swimming, fishing and exploring some areas with their four-wheel drive vehicles. An open-air train takes tourists along a 3.5 km track from the entrance of the park to Lake Biograd where row boats and bicycles are available for rent. The visitor centre is nearby featuring traditional furniture from this region and a restaurant and lookout. Three other lookouts are available at higher elevations at various locations within the park: Crna Glava, Zekova Glava, and Bendovac. Used by shepherds as summer homes in the past, the wooden cottages or "katuns" along the trails can be rented for overnight stays for "traditional, rustic food and lifestyle", according to one source. Overnight camping is also allowed in the park.

== Ecology ==
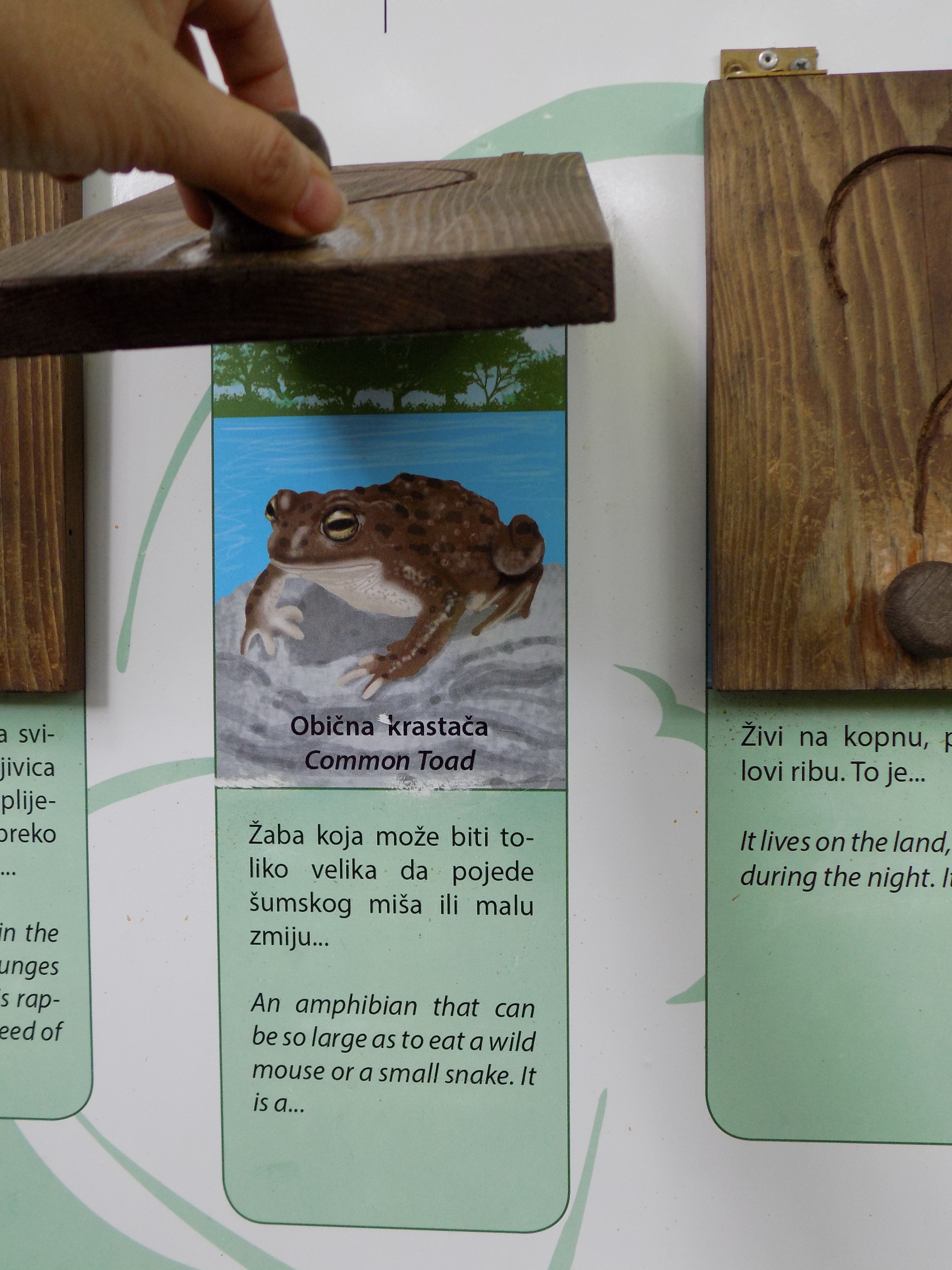
Educational boards along the trail

Although it is the smallest of the five national parks in Montenegro, Biogradska Gora National Park contains great diversity of flora and fauna. There are 26 different habitats of plants with 220 different plants, 150 species of birds, and 10 species of mammals live in this Park and in its forest, there are 86 species of trees and shrubs. In the waters of the park exist three species of trout and 350 species of insects. Rainfall is extremely high in the area, averaging up to 100 inches per year, and allows the growth of temperate rainforest. One of the unique features of the park is its virgin forest, Biogradska Gora (16 km²) with trees over five hundred years old. In the very heart of virgin forest is Biogradsko Lake, the largest glacier lake in this National park. The most common tree species around the lake are European beech, sycamore maple and European ash, and on the slopes beech and silver fir.

This National Park is recognized as an Important Plant Area, an Important Fungus Area and an Important Bird Area by UNESCO, which also provides the following additional specifics:

There is a great number of dynamic and complex eco-systems, high degree of refugial features of habitats as well as a considerable number of endemic and rare plant and animal species ... [the Park is] characterized by extraordinary specie and eco-system diversity that makes it the 'area of interest' and the centre of diversity of both flora and fauna of the Balkan Peninsula and Europe ... [and contains] one of the last European virgin forests [of 16 sq km].

== History of the Park ==
Biogradsko lake

When Kolašin was liberated from Ottoman rule in 1878, people from the Morača and Rovca presented a part of the forest to King Nicholas I Petrović-Njegoš of Montenegro. This forest was known as "Branik Kralja Nikole" (Bulwark of King Nicholas) and was protected.

Biogradska Gora was proclaimed a National Park in 1952. International protection (via UNESCO) was added in 1977 as part of the Man and the Biosphere Programme (MAB).

Open to visitors for a modest charge, it is popular in the summer for tourists seeking a cooler environment than the coast.

== Historical events ==
Nearby the National Park, a battle occurred with forces of the Ottoman Empire facing Montenegrins in the 1858 Battle of Kolašin. There were also important battles fought in the First Balkan War of 1912 and this region represented the center of activities of partisans in World War II. For years back, shepherds used rich pasture in this region for grazing sheep and cattle.

== See also ==
- Bjelasica Mountain
- Tourism in Montenegro
