= Brskovo =

Brskovo Брсково
- Village
- Location within Montenegro
- Country: Montenegro
- Region: Northern
- Municipality: Mojkovac

Population (2011)
  - Total: 222
- Time zone: UTC+1 (CET)
  - Summer (DST): UTC+2 (CEST)

Brskovo (Montenegrin Cyrillic: Брсково) is a village in northern Montenegro, within the Municipality of Mojkovac which used to have silver mines and a mint. Brskovo encompasses the whole complex of smaller localities, today overgrown with dense wood and weeds, between the Rudnica and Bjelojevići, the tributaries of the Tara River.

== History ==
Brskovo was first mentioned between 1219 and 1228, in a trade charter of Stefan the First-Crowned, addressed to the Republic of Ragusa.

The Latin name for Brskovo was Brescia, and it used to be the centre of a district. Having been regularly visited by merchants from Kotor and Dubrovnik, this town with the Virgin's church administered by the Dominicans from Dubrovnik, had been at its zenith in the 1280s, while from 1350 onwards, it completely declined. As a mine, Brskovo was established by the Saxons inhabiting this area. They had their prince and Catholic priests. During its golden age, at the time of Stefan Uroš I, a customs office existed in Brskovo as well as, a century later, a consulate of Dubrovnik. Money called «Grossi de Brescova» was minted in Brskovo. Dante in his Paradiso mentions the mines and mint in Chapter XIX, pp. 139-141.

In 1399, the Turks took Brskovo, and according to Dubrovnik sources, in 1433 it was an abandoned place.

On the whole inland territory of present-day Montenegro, Brskovo was the only commercial centre whose importance could measure up to that of the coastal towns. Not even coastal towns could boast about such value of production and income.

At a dominant position, remains of a fortification – Hill-fort– i.e. a town controlling nearby and the more distant area is situated.

== Demographics ==
According to the 2011 census, its population was 222.

Ethnicity in 2011
Ethnicity	Number	Percentage
Montenegrins	106	47.7%
Serbs	96	43.2%
other/undeclared	20	9.0%
Total	222	100%
