= List of national parks of Montenegro =

Montenegro has five national parks which cover approximately 10 percent of the country's territory. The parks are managed by the National Parks of Montenegro government agency (Montenegrin: Nacionalni parkovi Crne Gore / Национални паркови Црне Горе).

This indicates that the national park is part of a World Heritage Site

| Name | Image | Location | Area | Established |
|---|---|---|---|---|
| Durmitor | | Northwest Montenegro (Žabljak, Šavnik, Plužine, Pljevlja and Mojkovac municipalities) | 39,000 ha (96,371 acres) | 1952 |
| Biogradska Gora | | Northeast Montenegro (Kolašin, Mojkovac, Berane, and Andrijevica municipalities) | 5,650 ha (13,961 acres) | 1952 |
| Lovćen | | South Montenegro (Cetinje and Budva municipalities) | 6,220 ha (15,370 acres) | 1952 |
| Lake Skadar | | Southeast Montenegro (Zeta, Tuzi, Bar and Cetinje municipalities) | 40,000 ha (98,842 acres) | 1983 |
| Prokletije | | East Montenegro (Plav and Gusinje municipalities) | 16,630 ha (41,094 acres) | 2009 |

== Regional nature parks ==
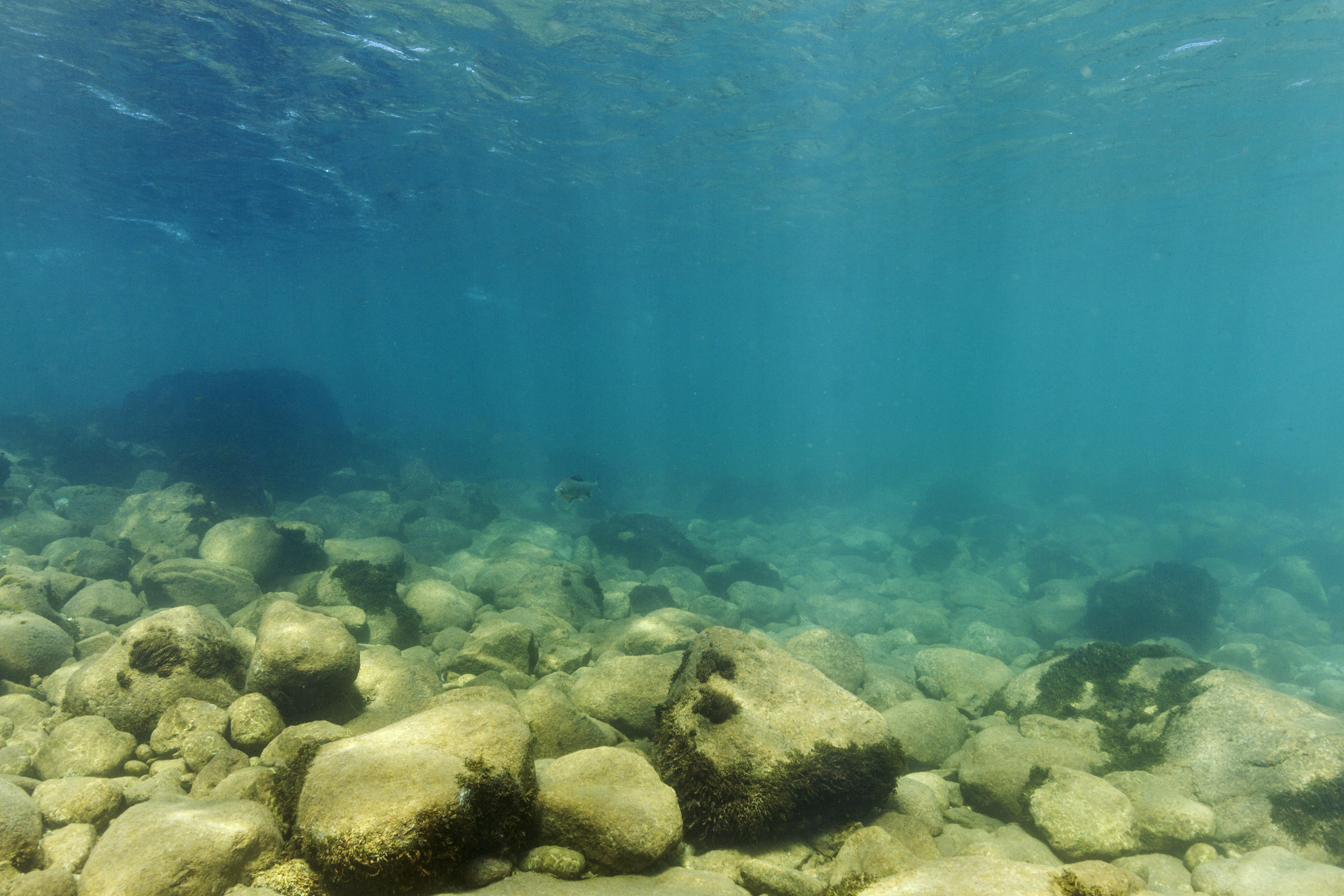
Piva

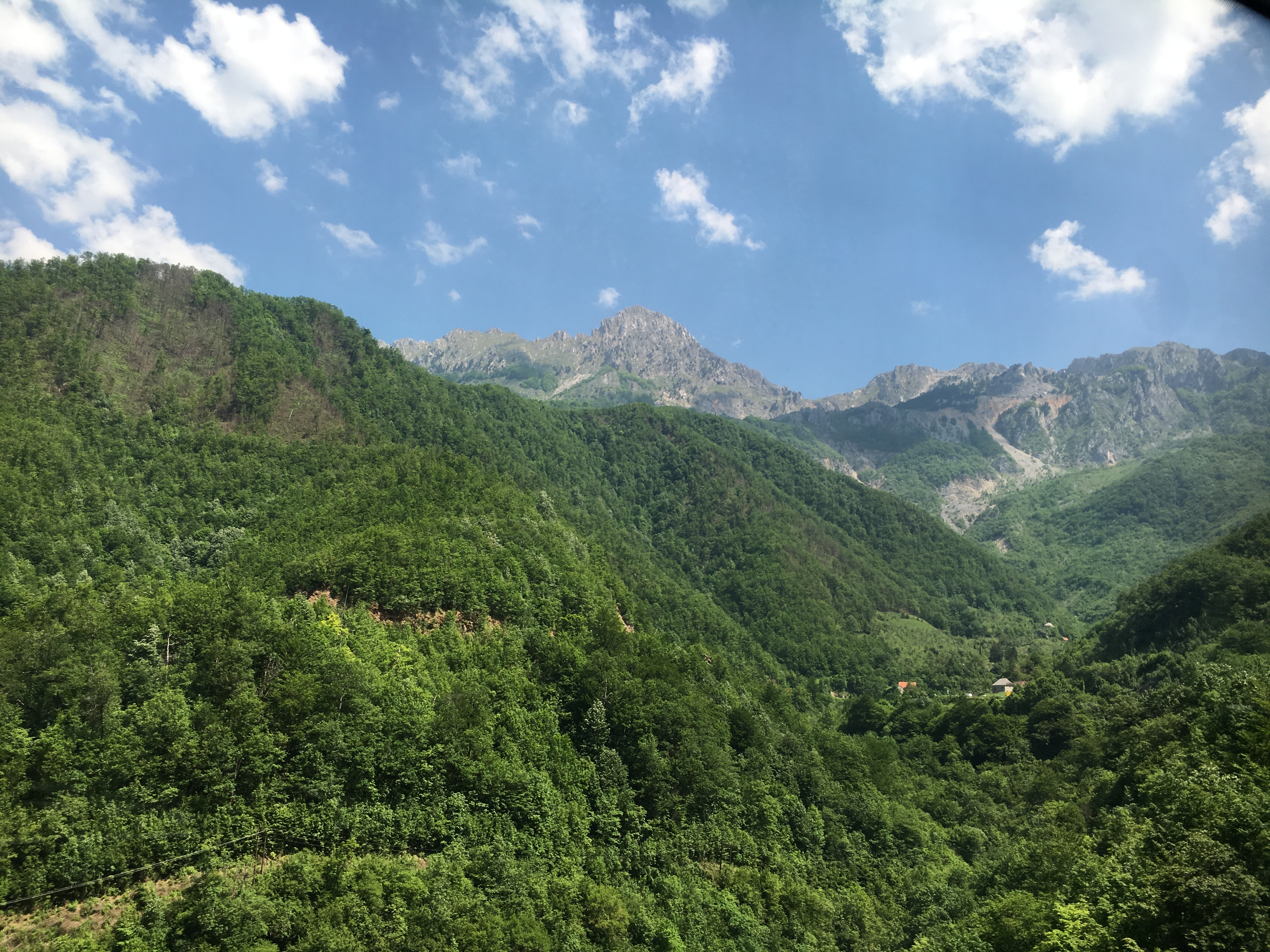
Sinjajevina

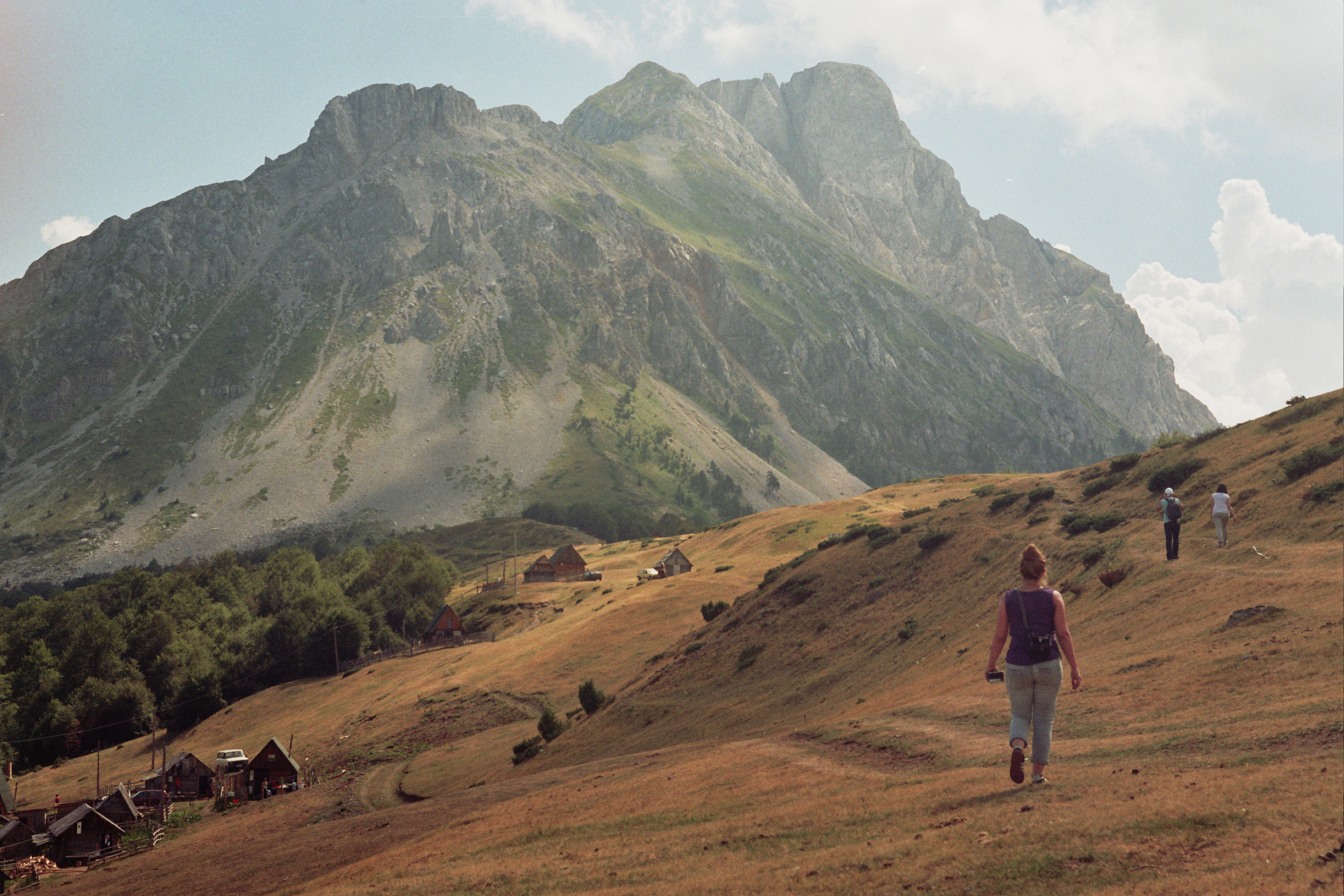
Komovi

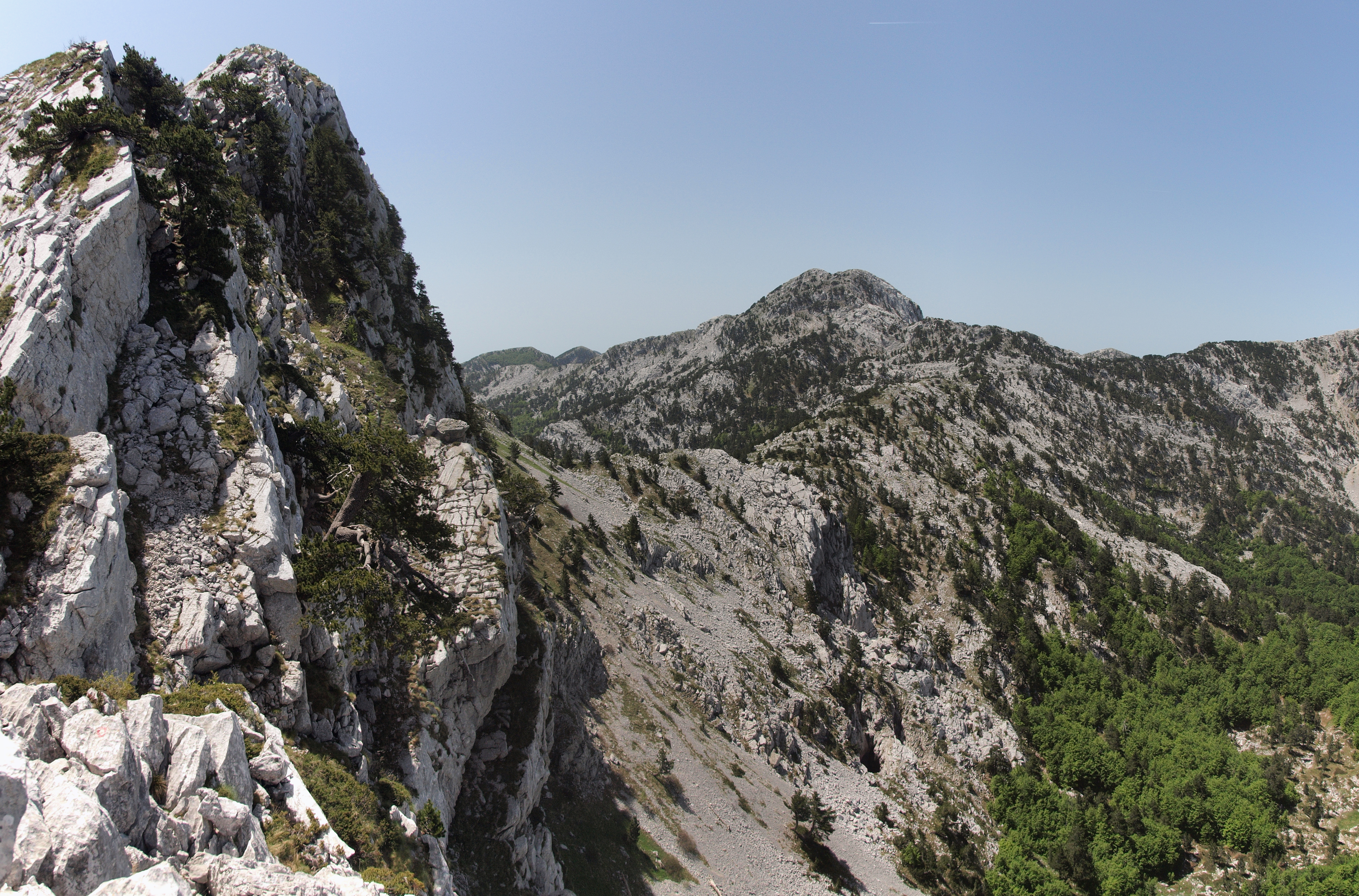
Orjen

== See also ==
- List of World Heritage Sites in Montenegro
