= Sinjajevina =

Mountain in Montenegro

- Сињајевина
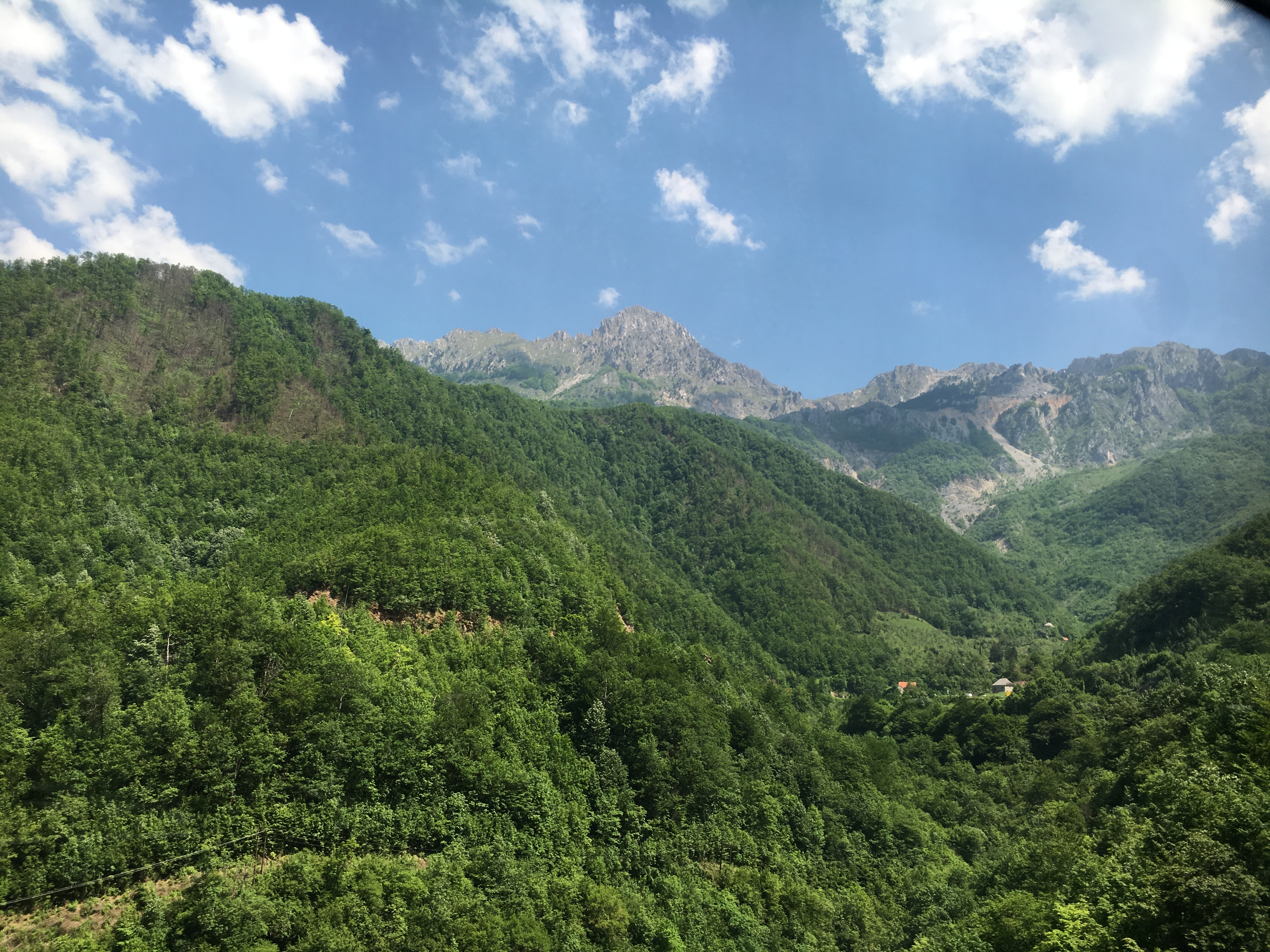
- Sinjajevina

Highest point
- Elevation: 2,277 m (7,470 ft)
- Coordinates: 42°57′30″N 19°20′00″E

Geography
- Location within Montenegro
- Location: Montenegro

Sinjajevina (Montenegrin: Сињајевина, pronounced [sǐɲajɛʋina]), also known as Sinjavina (pronounced [sǐɲaːʋina]), is a mountain in northern Montenegro. The highest point of Sinjajevina is Jablanov vrh, which is 2,277 m (7,470 ft) high.

== Features ==
Mount Sinjajevina extends from southeast to northwest, between the town of Kolašin and the village of Njegovuđa, near Žabljak. The massif is 40 km long and 15 km wide.

Geologically, its composition is cretaceous limestone. The high mountain plain averages 1,600 m (5,249 ft) in elevation, with only a few higher peaks.

=== Peaks ===
The highest peaks of Mount Sinjajevina are:

- Jablanov vrh 2,277 m (7,470 ft)
- Torna 2,203 m (7,228 ft)
- Gradiste 2,214 m (7,264 ft)
- Sto 2,172 m (7,126 ft)
- Savina greda 2,101 m (6,893 ft)
- Veliki Pecarac 2,042 m (6,699 ft)
- Veliki Starac 2,022 m (6,634 ft)
- Babin vrh 2,013 m (6,604 ft)
- Sto 1,959 m (6,427 ft)
- Korman 1,923 m (6,309 ft)
- Mali Starac 1,921 m (6,302 ft)

=== Lakes ===
Mount Sinjajevina is home to two lakes, both in a process of natural extinction:

- Zabojsko Lake
- Zminičko Lake

== See also ==
- Durmitor
- Kolašin
- Njegovuđa
- Žabljak
