= Northern Montenegro =

Region of Montenegro

Northern Montenegro Sjever Crne Gore Cjевер Црне Горе
- Region in Montenegro
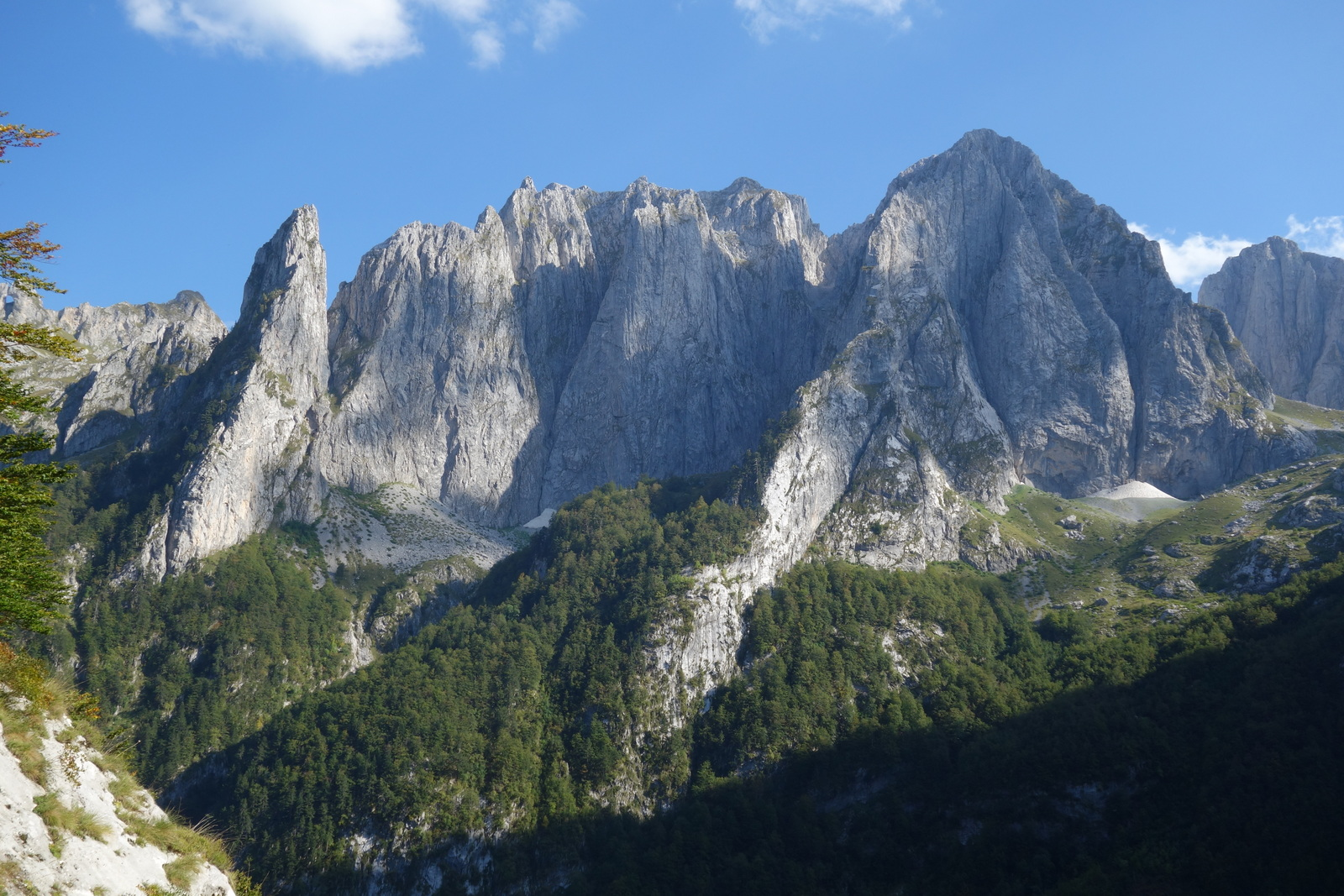
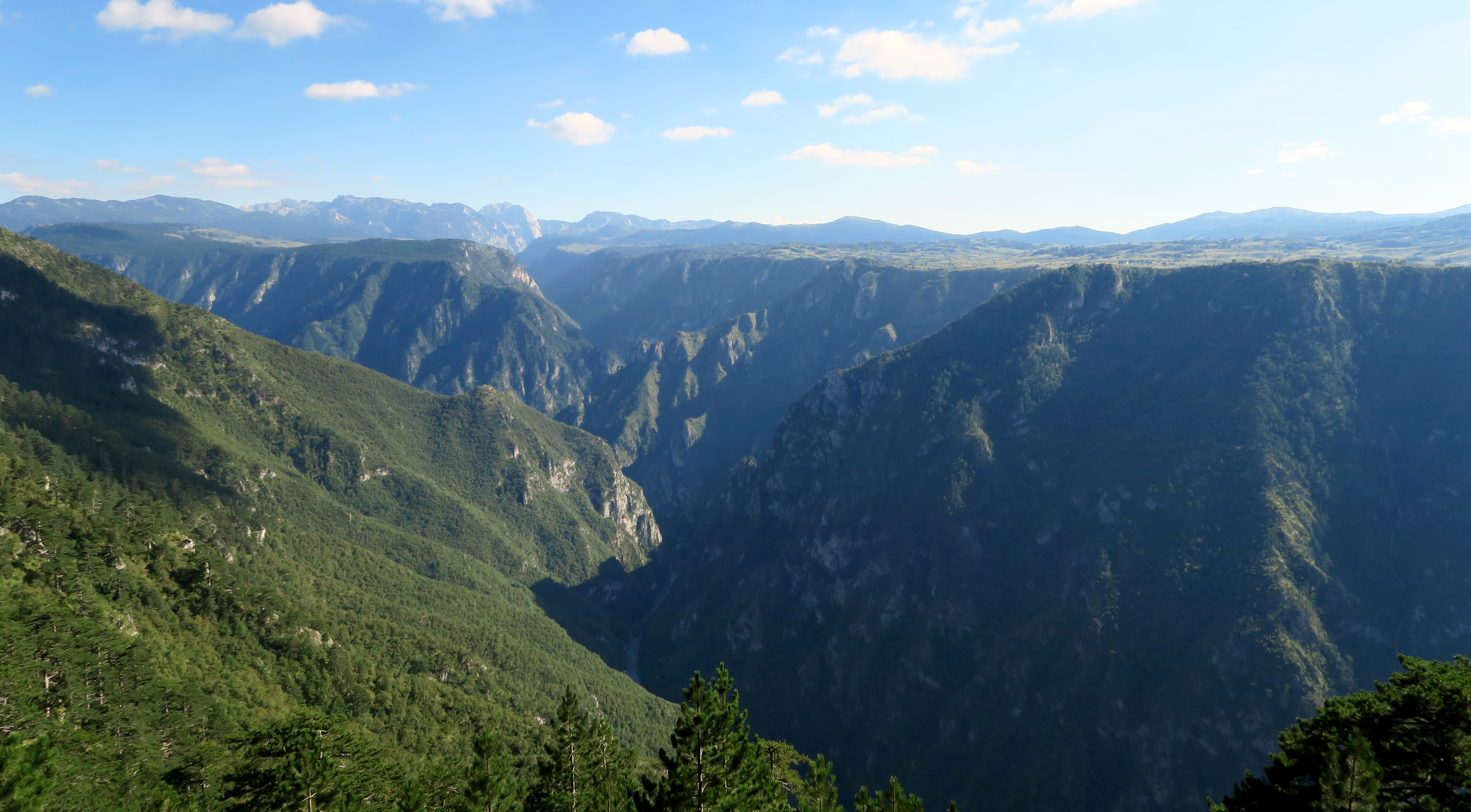
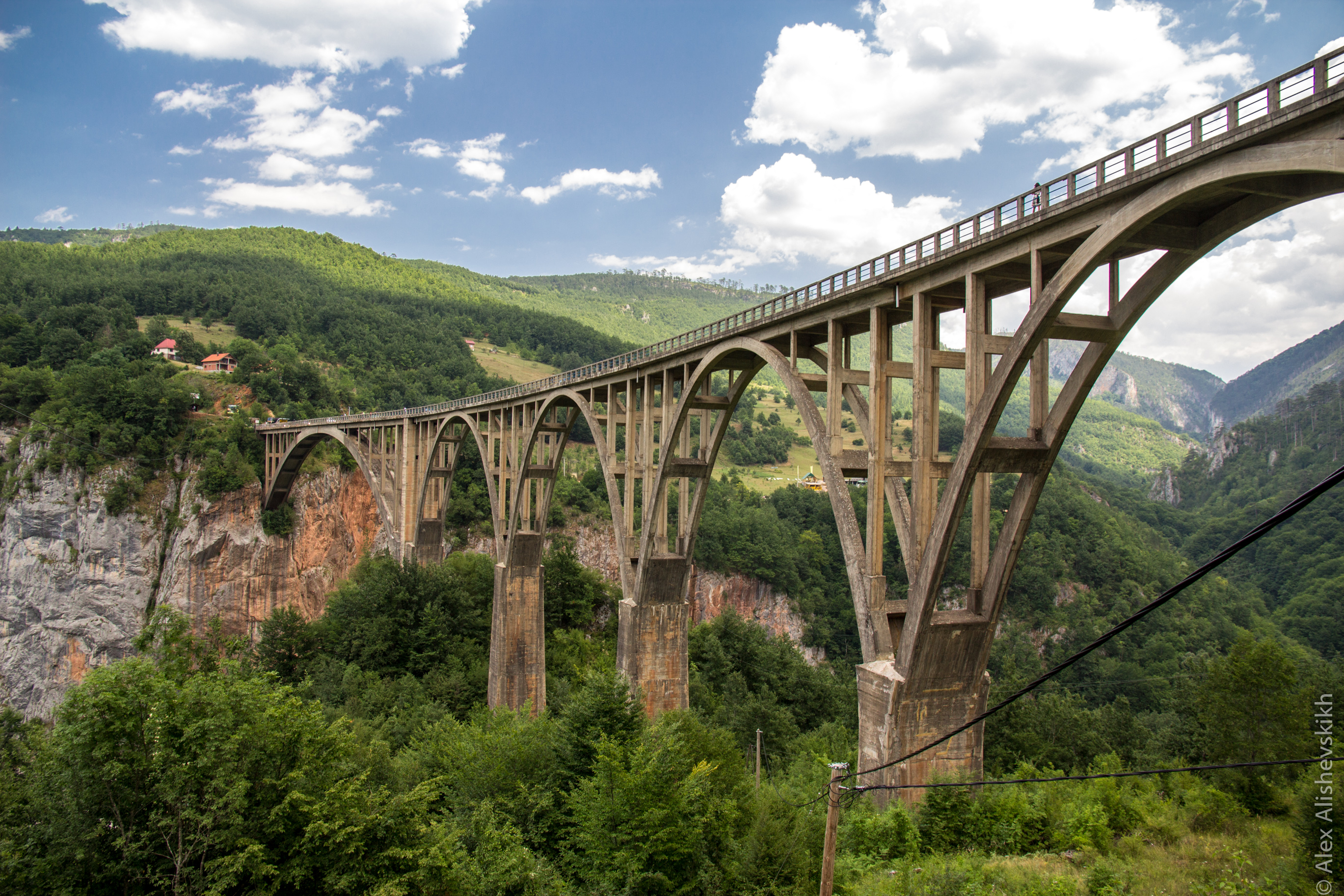
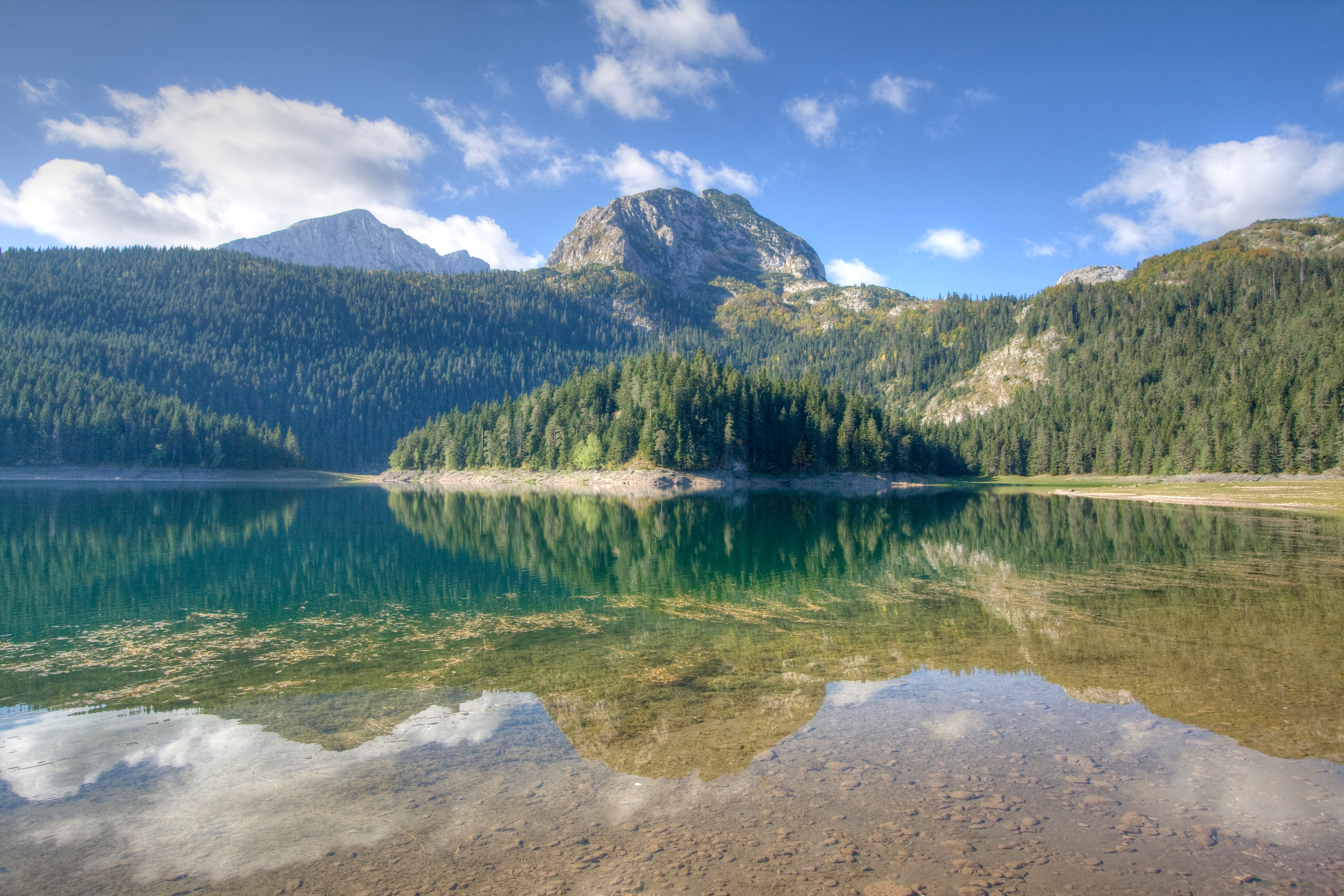
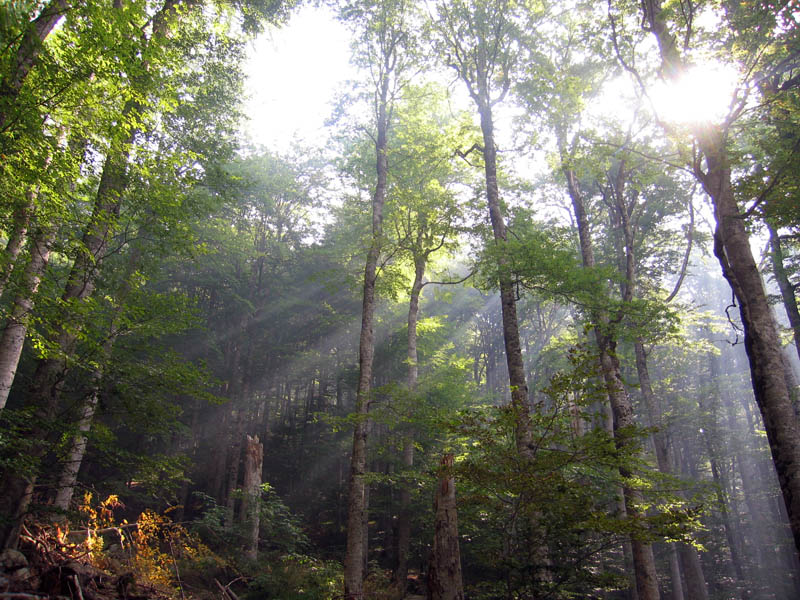
- Prokletije Tara canyon Tara bridge Black Lake Biogradska Gora

- Northern Montenegro
- Country: Montenegro
- Established: 2006
- Largest city: Pljevlja
- Municipalities: 13: Andrijevica; Berane; Bijelo Polje; Gusinje; Kolašin; Mojkovac; Petnjica; Plav; Pljevlja; Plužine; Rožaje; Šavnik; Žabljak

Area
  - Total: 8,399 km^{2} (3,243 sq mi)

Population
  - Total: 152,591 ▼
  - Density: 18.17/km^{2} (47.05/sq mi)
- Time zone: UTC+1 (CET)
  - Summer (DST): UTC+2 (CEST)
- HDI: 0.826 (2021) very high · 2nd

Northern Montenegro (Montenegrin: Sjever Crne Gore / Cjевер Црне Горе) is one of three statistical regions in Montenegro. It encompasses the sparsely populated mountainous part of Montenegro. It is bordered by Bosnia and Herzegovina to the northwest, Serbia to the northeast, Kosovo to the east, Albania to the southeast and central region of Montenegro to the south. It comprises thirteen municipalities and is the largest by area.

== Municipalities ==
Northern Montenegro comprises thirteen municipalities. Municipalities in Northern Montenegro include: Andrijevica, Berane, Bijelo Polje, Gusinje, Kolašin, Mojkovac, Petnjica, Plav, Plužine, Pljevlja, Rožaje, Šavnik and Žabljak.

== Demographics ==
The northern region of Montenegro is primarily rural, with a population that tends to be smaller and more dispersed compared to urban areas. It's known for its mountainous terrain, with towns and villages scattered throughout. The largest town by population is Pljevlja, while the largest municipality is Bijelo Polje. Demographically, it includes a mix of Serbs (40.5%), Bosniaks (30.9%), Montenegrins (19%), Albanians (2.2%) and other ethnic groups (7.4%).

Municipality	Area		Population (2023)	
Municipality	Km²	Rank	Total	Rank
Andrijevica	283	12	3,978	10
Berane	544	6	25,162	3
Bijelo Polje	924	2	39,710	1
Gusinje	486	8	4,662	9
Kolašin	897	3	6,765	7
Mojkovac	367	11	6,824	6
Petnjica	173	13	5,552	8
Plav	486	7	10,378	5
Plužine	854	4	2,232	12
Pljevlja	1,346	1	24,542	4
Rožaje	432	10	25,247	2
Šavnik	553	5	1,588	13
Žabljak	445	9	3,002	11

=== Religion ===
Majority of the population is identifying as Orthodox Christian, but also a significant portion are Muslims.

Religion in Northern Montenegro (2023)
1. Eastern Orthodoxy (56.7%)
2. Islam (41.4%)

== Administration ==
List of current mayors and local governments
Democratic Party of Socialists (3)
New Serb Democracy (3)
Bosniak Party (2)
Socialist People's Party (2)
Social Democrats (1)
Democratic Montenegro (1)
Durmitorska Inicijativa (1)

Municipality	Current Mayor	Party	Local government	Elected
Bijelo Polje	Petar Smolović	DPS	DPS-SD-SDP-BS	2022
Pljevlja	Dario Vraneš	NSD	ZBCG-DCG-PES!	2022
Berane	Vuko Todorović	NSD	ZBCG-DCG-PBS-PCG-UCG	2022
Rožaje	Rahman Husović	BS	BS	2022
Plav	Nihad Canović	SD	SD-DPS-SDP-BS	2022
Mojkovac	Vesko Delić	NSD	ZBCG-DCG-SNP-URA	2021
Kolašin	Petko Bakić	DCG	DCG-ZBCG-PES!-SNP-URA-UCG	2022
Petnjica	Erol Muratović	DPS	DPS-SD-BS	2021
Andrijevica	Željko Ćulafić	SNP	SNP-ZBCG-DCG	2020
Gusinje	Sanel Balić	BS	BS-DUA-AA-SD-SDP-SNP	2020
Žabljak	Radoš Žugić	DI	DI-ZBCG-DCG-PCG	2022
Plužine	Slobodan Delić	SNP	SNP	2022
Šavnik	Jugoslav Jakić	DPS	DPS-SD	2022

== Environment ==
=== National Parks ===
There are three national parks in Northern Montenegro: Durmitor, Biogradska gora and Prokletije. Durmitor is part of World Heritage Site.

This indicates that the national park is part of a World Heritage Site

Name	Image	Location	Area	Established
Durmitor		(Žabljak, Šavnik, Plužine, Pljevlja and Mojkovac municipalities)	39,000 ha (96,371 acres)	1952
Biogradska Gora		(Kolašin, Mojkovac, Berane, and Andrijevica municipalities)	5,650 ha (13,961 acres)	1952
Prokletije		(Plav and Gusinje municipalities)	16,630 ha (41,094 acres)	2009

=== Fauna ===
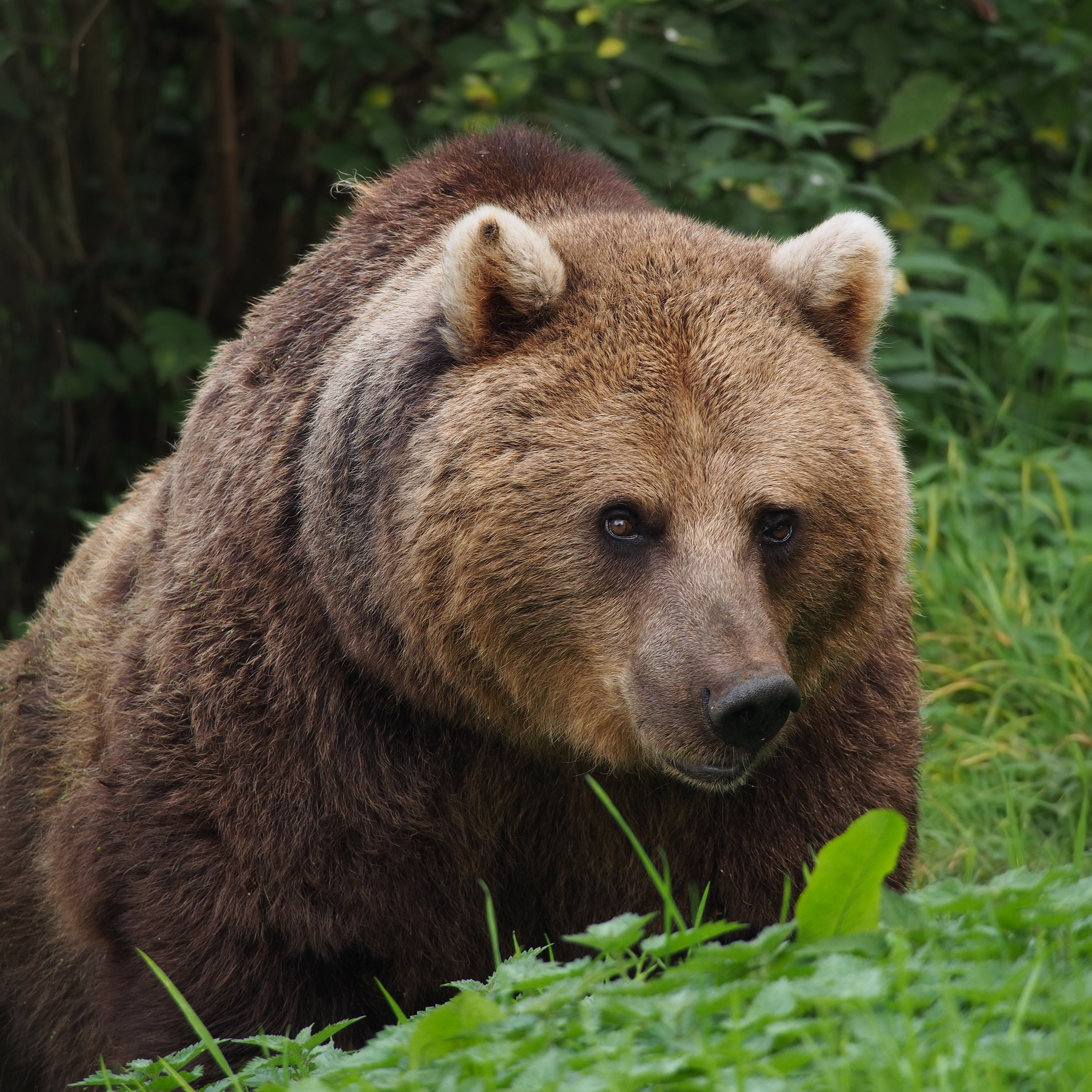
European brown bear

Within Montenegro, the largest concentration of large animals can be found within the north of the country. These higher numbers can be attributed to the areas being mountainous and containing a virgin forest. Brown bears can be found within this area of Montenegro, living within Biogradska Gora national park. There are estimated to be less than 130 individuals living in the wild. These bears are known to reach a weight of up to 200 kg and generally remain docile except for mating season.

Other carnivores such as wolves and Balkan lynxes live in the virgin forest as well, remaining distant from urban areas, this excludes occasional issues occurring from wolves hunting livestock. The Balkan Lynx along with other European species of lynx, remains critically endangered and there have been efforts from environmental organisations to increase protection and prevent extinction of the species. The Balkan lynx has an estimated population of between 40 and 70 individuals in the wild.

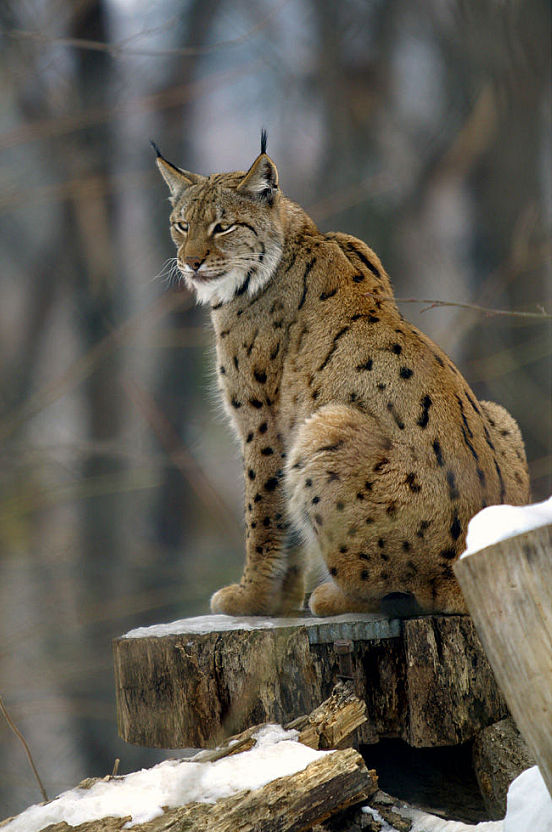
Balkan lynx

Among these larger carnivores is the golden jackal, wild dogs that retain a more slender build and lighter coat than wolves. Northern Montenegro has two predominant species of deer, these are the red deer and the roe deer. Alongside these fauna in the mountains is the Balkan Chamois, a small mountain goat native to the Balkan mountain regions. Domesticated animals include large numbers of rabbits and livestock.

The Durmitor National Park is home to the Musor rock lizard and the sharp snouted lizard. Both species are native to Montenegro.

== See also ==
- Montenegro
- Coastal Montenegro
- Statistical regions of Montenegro
- Municipalities of Montenegro
- Geography of Montenegro
- National parks of Montenegro
