= Mojkovac Municipality =

Mojkovac Municipality Opština Mojkovac Општина Мојковац
- Municipality
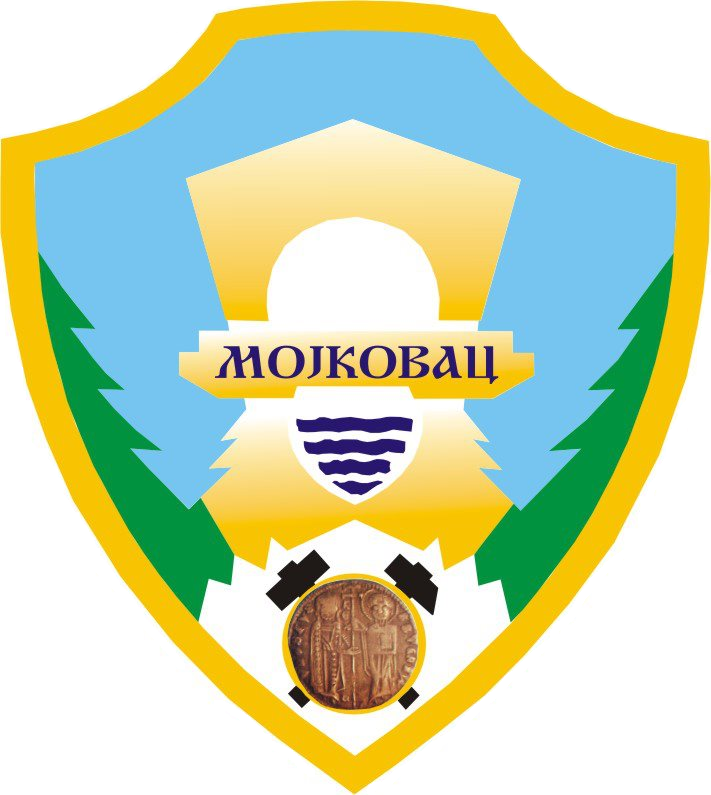
- Coat of arms

- Mojkovac Municipality in Montenegro
- Country: Montenegro
- Seat: Mojkovac

Area
  - Total: 367 km^{2} (142 sq mi)
- Postal code: 84205
- Area code: +382 50
- ISO 3166-2 code: ME-11
- Car plates: MK
- Website: www.mojkovac.me

Mojkovac Municipality (Montenegrin: Opština Mojkovac / Општина Мојковац) is one of the municipalities of Montenegro. The municipality is located in northern Montenegro. The administrative center of the municipality is the town of Mojkovac.

== Geography and location ==
The municipality of Mojkovac covers an area of 367 km^{2} (142 sq mi) and according to the number of inhabitants (10 015 / 2003g) is among the smallest municipalities in Montenegro. Mojkovac is on the west bank of the Tara River, between the mountains of Bjelasica and Sinjajevina. The old mining village of Brskovo is nearby. Brskovo is one of the oldest mines in the region.

The territory of the municipality borders the municipalities of: Kolašin, Šavnik, Žabljak, Bijelo Polje and Berane. Mojkovac has a station on the Belgrade–Bar railway. It is also at the intersection of the main road connecting Montenegro's coast and Podgorica with northern Montenegro and Serbia (E65, E80), and the road leading towards Žabljak and Pljevlja.

== Settlements ==
=== City Assembly (2021–2025) ===
The municipal parliament consists of 31 deputies elected directly for a four-year term.

Party / Coalition	Seats	Local government
DPS	13 / 31	Opposition
ZBCG (NSD–DNP)	4 / 31	Government
DCG	4 / 31	Government
SNP	3 / 31	Government
PES	2 / 31	Government
URA	2 / 31	Government
UCG	1 / 31	Government
PzP	1 / 31	Government
SD	1 / 31	Opposition

== Demographics ==
The town of Mojkovac is the administrative centre of the Mojkovac municipality, which in 2003 had a population of 10,066. The town of Mojkovac itself has 4,120 residents.

Ethnic groups (2011 census):

- Montenegrins - 5,097 (59.12%)
- Serbs - 3,058 (35.47%)
- Others and unanswered: 467 (5,42%)

Language (2011 census):

- Serbian - 4,779 (55,43%)
- Montenegrin - 3,331 (38,63%)
- Other and unanswered: 512 (5,94%)

Ethnic groups (2023 census):

- Montenegrins - 3,634 (54.01%)
- Serbs - 2,804 (41.68%)
- Others and unanswered: 290(4,31%)

Religion (2023 census):

- Eastern Orthodoxy- 6,525 (96,98%)
- Other and unanswered: 203 (3,02%)

Language (2023 census):

- Serbian - 3,838 (57,05%)
- Montenegrin - 2,464 (36,62%)
- Other and unanswered: 426 (6,33%)

== Gallery ==
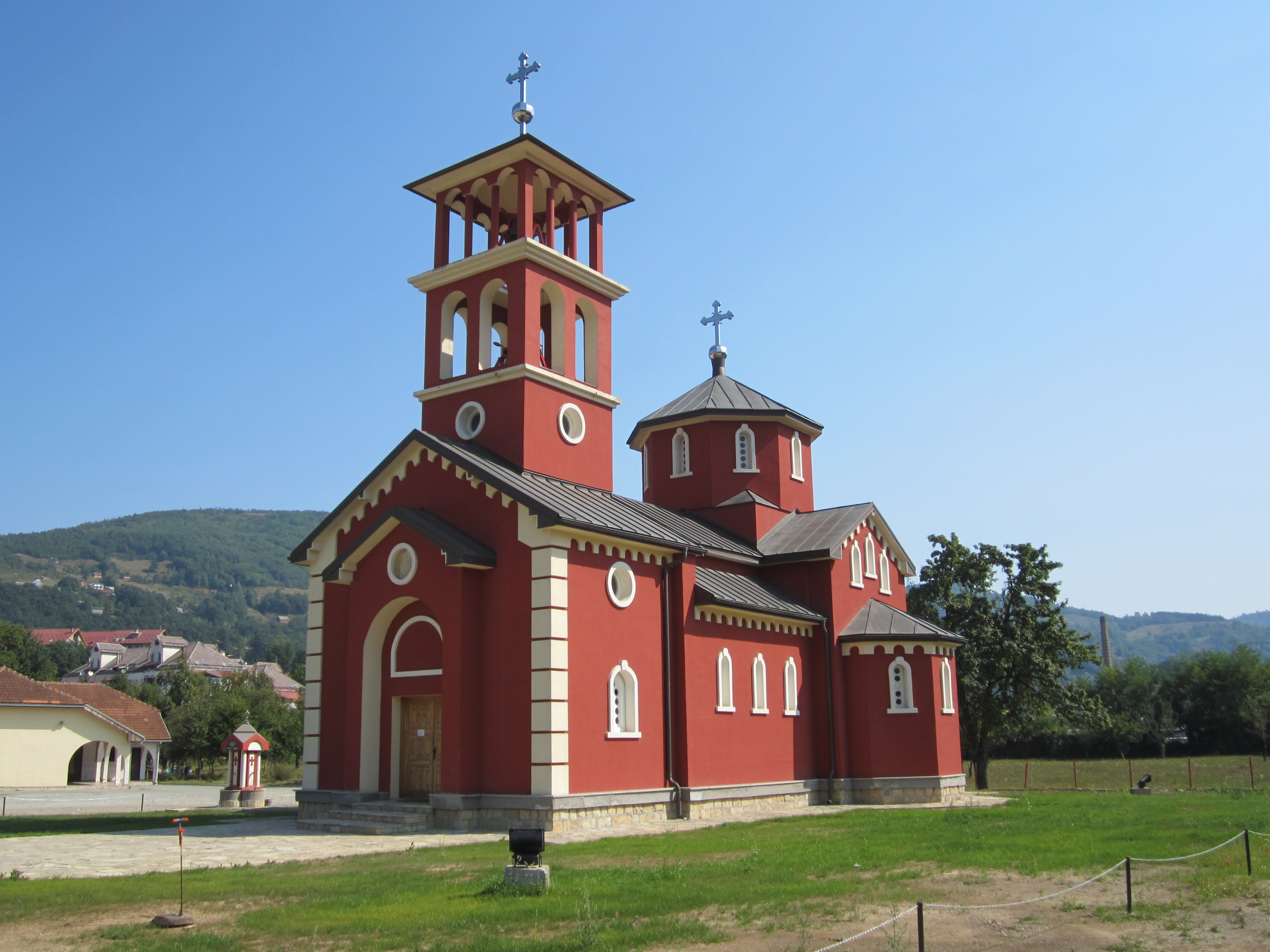
Orthodox Church in the town of Mojkovac

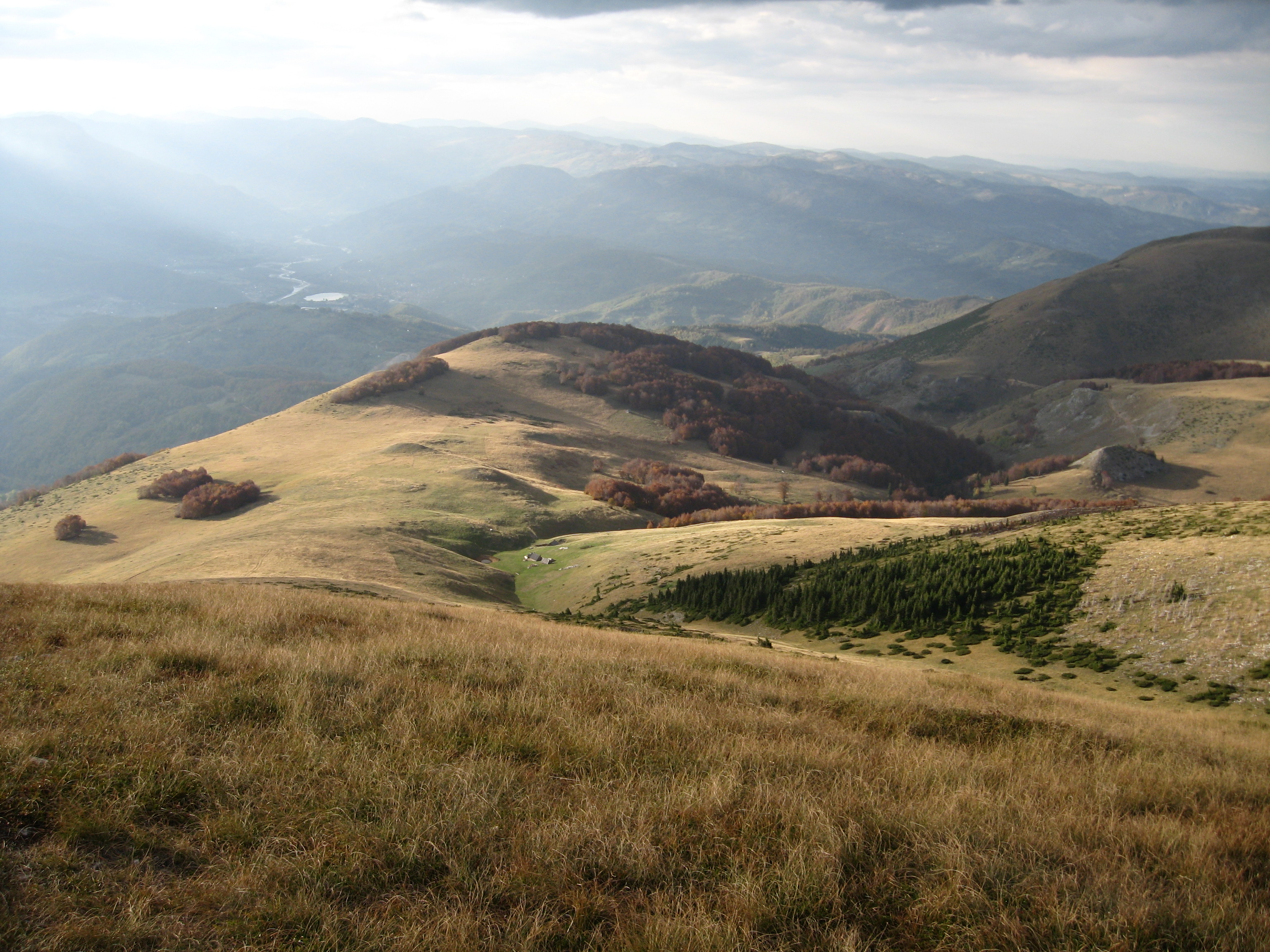
Bjelasica mountain, Mojkovac municipality

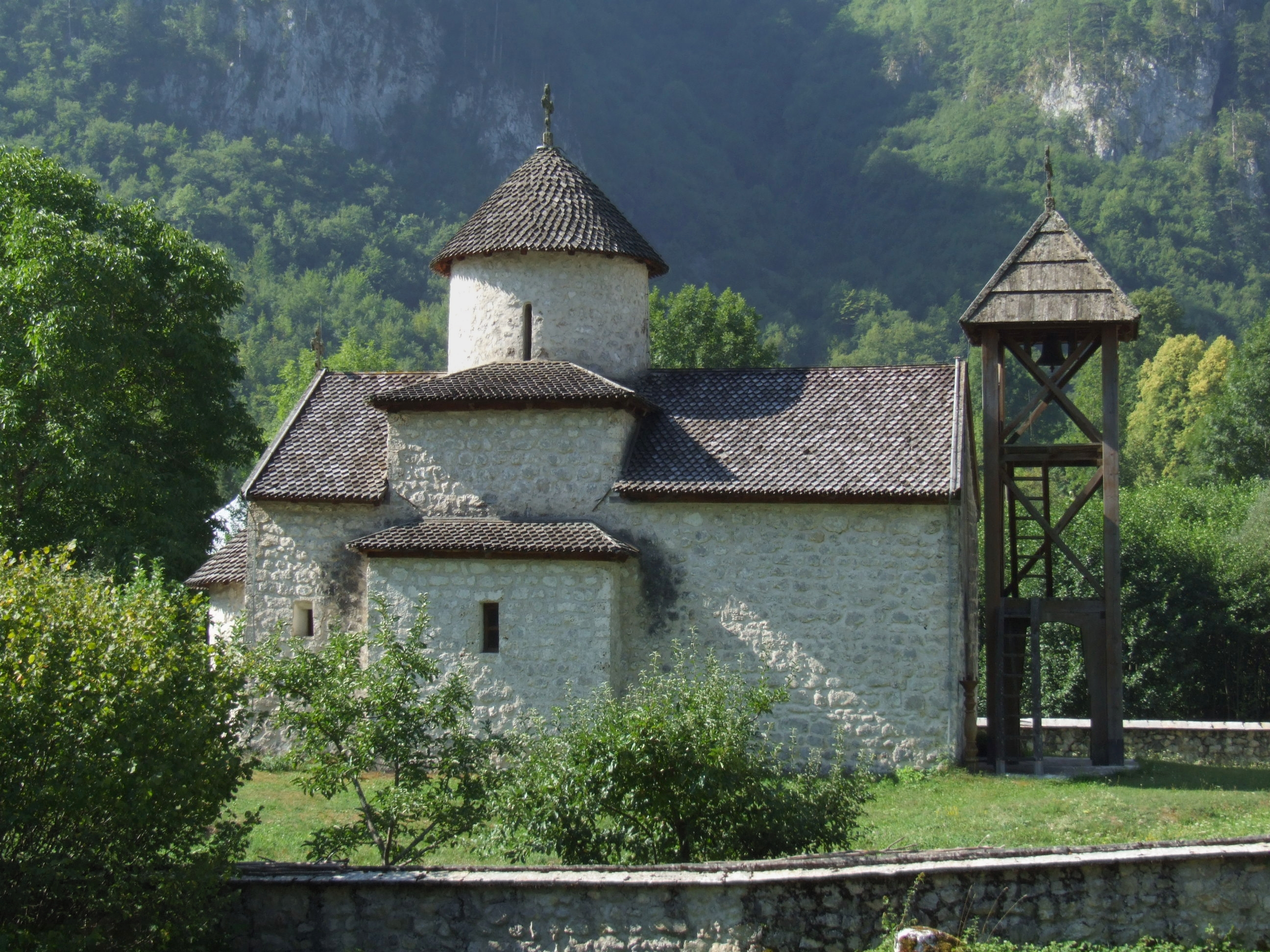
Dobrilovina Monastery near the town of Mojkovac

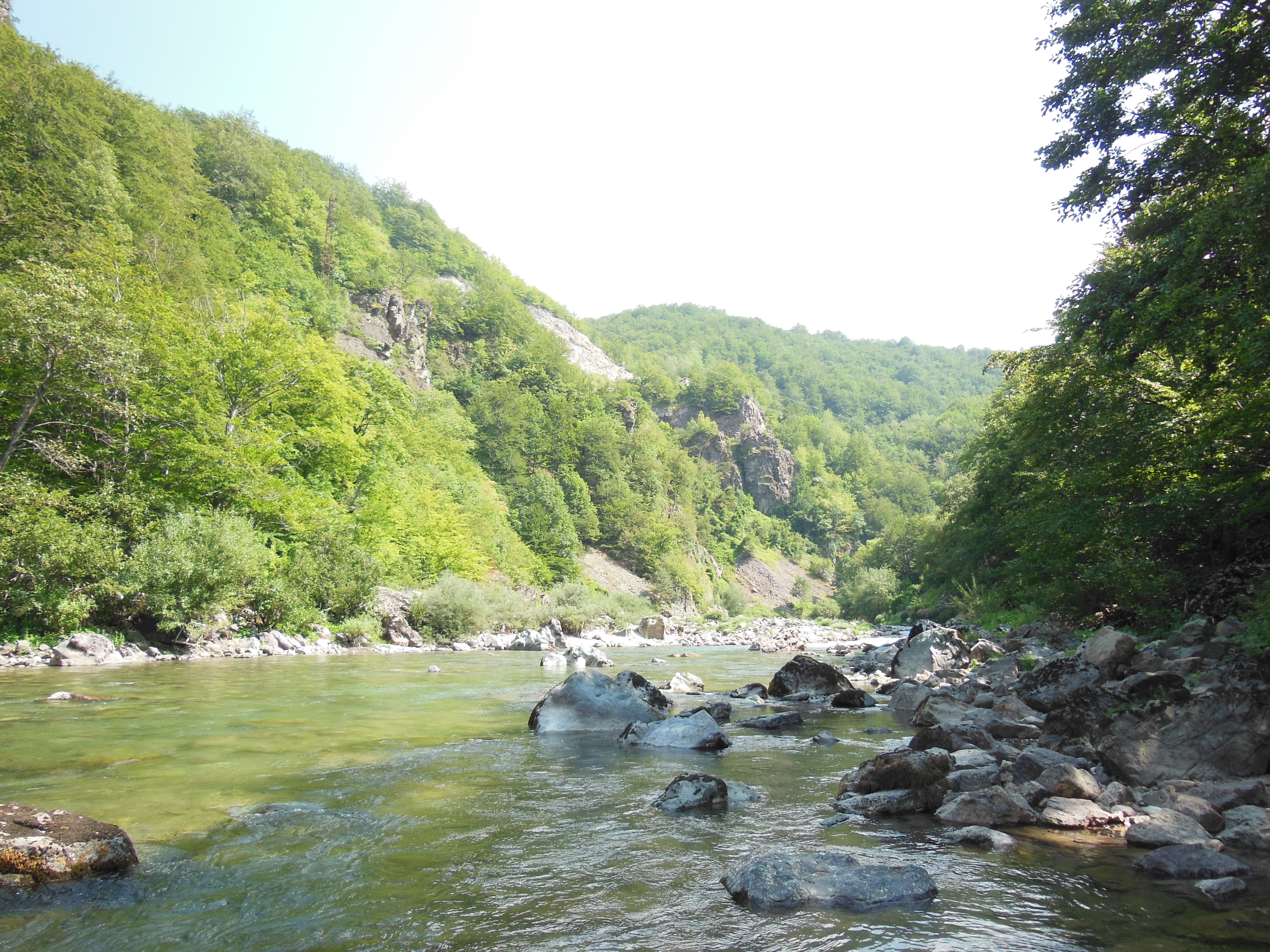
Tara river, Mojkovac municipality
