= Cuce =

Historical tribe and region of Montenegro

Old Montenegrin tribes, Cuce is no. 5.

Cuce (Cyrillic: Цуце, Serbo-Croatian pronunciation: [tsûtse]) is a historical tribe (pleme) and region in Montenegro, located in the area of the Katunska nahija from Old Montenegro.

== History ==
The toponym Cuce is first mentioned in 1431 in documents from Kotor, then again in a chrysobull of the Cetinje Monastery from the end of the 15th century. In Ottoman defters from 1521 and 1523, Cuce is mentioned as a village. The majority of inhabitants migrated to Cuce in the 16th and 17th century, from Old Herzegovina and Old Kuči. In 1718, after the Peace of Passarowitz, the Cuce along with 9 other tribes of the Katun nahiya, became de facto independent from the Ottoman Empire.

In 1829 Bjelice struggled against Ozrinići and Cuce, two neighboring tribes, and Petar I Petrović-Njegoš sent Sima Milutinović Sarajlija and Mojsije to negotiate peace among them.

Smail-aga Cengic wrote a letter in 1838 to Njegos, complaining about the Cuce who had raided Ottoman territory.

Traditionally, the Vojvode (Dukes) of tribe were from the House of Krivokapić and the Serdari (Counts) were from the House of Perović. In the case of lower Cuce, Knez (Prince) Rogan founded the House of Roganović.

== Anthropology ==
Jovan Cvijić extensively studied the tribes of Old Montenegro. Cuce are divided into Upper Cuce and Lower Cuce. Most of the inhabitants of Upper Cuce descend from Herzegovina, while the inhabitants of Lower Cuce generally descend from the Kuči tribe.

- Kovači
- Kovačevići
- Krivokapići, brotherhood originally from Old Herzegovina
- Banićevići
- Šakići
- Zviceri, originally from Old Kuči
- Simovići
- Živkovići
- Mijanovići
- Perovići
- Đuričići (oldest family in Cuce)
- Vujadinovići
- Roganovići
- Bigovići
- Markovići
- Stevovići
- Ćosovići
- Perišići
- Popovići
- Jovovići
- Ivanovići, brotherhood originally from Old Herzegovina, descending from Šćepan Ivanov; today all four brotherhoods are included in the Krivokapići; slava of St. Nicholas
  - Mijatovići
  - Ivanovići
  - Zukovići
  - Đukanovići, base in Krajište
- Đurovići
- Cucovići
- Otaševići
- Tomanovići, originally from Old Kuči
- Pešikan

The Djer-didije is a dance of the Cuce.

== People ==
- Nikac Tomanović, Montenegrin chief
- Slavko Perović, famous Montenegrin politician.
- Ilarion Roganović, Metropolitan of Montenegro (1860-1882)
- Knez (Prince) Rogan, Montenegrin clan chief of Lower Cuce & eponymous founder of house Roganović
- Krsto Zrnov Popović, leader of the 1919 Christmas Uprising
- Radovan Krivokapić, Montenegrin football player
- Miodrag Krivokapić, former Montenegrin football player
- Goran Krivokapić, Montenegrin classical guitarist
- Miodrag Živković (politician), Montenegrin politician
- Zdravko Krivokapić, Montenegrin politician
- Dragoljub Đuričić, prominent Serbian and Montenegrin musician
- Miko Đuričić, prominent Montenegrin photographer
- Nenad Knežević Knez, popular Montenegrin singer, by ancestry
- Ranko Krivokapić, Montenegrin politician, by ancestry
- Miodrag Krivokapić, Serbian actor; by paternal ancestry
- Boris Krivokapić, Serbian professor of Public International Law and Human rights and author; by paternal ancestry
- Milorad Krivokapic, Serbian-Hungarian handballer; by paternal ancestry
- Milorad Krivokapić, former Montenegrin water polo player, by ancestry
- Petar Banićević, Montenegrin actor
- Ana Pešikan, former minister of science and technology in the Government of Serbia
- Blažo Pešikan, former Montenegrin footballer
