= Krivokapić =

Krivokapić (Serbian Cyrillic: Кривокапић), is a Montenegrin and Serbian surname, a patronymic of the nickname krivokapa, which means "crooked cap".

Bearers of the surname traditionally exist in Upper Cuce, in western Montenegro, from where they have migrated to Prokuplje, southern Serbia (in 1875). The families are predominantly Orthodox Christian.

== Notable people with the name ==
- Boris Krivokapić (born 1958), Serbian professor and scientist
- Goran Krivokapić (born 1979), Montenegrin classical guitarist
- Igor Krivokapič (born 1965), Slovenian composer and tubist
- Ivana Krivokapić (born 1995), Montenegrin footballer
- Marko Krivokapić (born 1976), Serbian handball player
- Matija Krivokapić (born 2003), Montenegrin footballer
- Milorad Krivokapić (handballer) (born 1980), Serbian-Hungarian handball player
- Milorad Krivokapić (water polo) (born 1956), Serbian water polo player
- Miloš Krivokapić (1819–1907), Montenegrin commander
- Milovan Krivokapić (born 1949), Serbian politician
- Miodrag Krivokapić (actor) (born 1949), Serbian actor
- Miodrag Krivokapić (footballer) (born 1959), Montenegrin footballer
- Olivera Krivokapić (born 1962), Serbian basketball player
- Radivoj Krivokapić (born 1953), Yugoslav handball player
- Radovan Krivokapić (born 1978), Serbian footballer
- Rajko Krivokapić (born 1986), Montenegrin basketball coach
- Ranko Krivokapić (born 1961), Montenegrin politician
- Zdravko Krivokapić (born 1958), Montenegrin professor and politician, former Prime Minister of Montenegro

== Sources ==
- Đorđe L. Sredanović (1990). Vučija i Vučijani. Slovo.
- Mihailo Petrović (1941). Đerdapski ribolovi u prošlosti i u sadašnjosti. Izd. Zadužbine Mikh. R. Radivojeviča.
- Serbian ethnographic series. Srpska akademija nauka i umetnosti. 1965.
