= Miloš Krivokapić =

Montenegrin Tribal Leader and Military Commander of Cuce

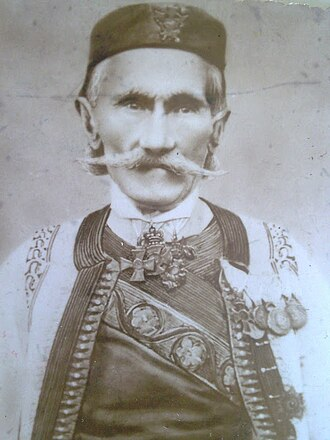
- Miloš Krivokapić with his awards for achievements
- Born: Miloš Androv Krivokapić; 1819; Upper Cuce, Prince-Bishopric of Montenegro (now Montenegro)
- Died: 1907 (aged 87–88)
- Military career
- Allegiance: Principality of Montenegro
- Service years: 1838–1858
- Rank: perjanik (royal guard) serdar ("count") vojvoda ("duke")
- Nickname: Vojvoda Miloš
- Conflicts: Battles of Grahovo (1838–1843); Battle of Grahovac (1858)

Miloš Androv Krivokapić (Serbian Cyrillic: Милош Кривокапић; 1819–1907), also known as Serdar Miloš, was a tribal leader and military commander of Cuce, who served the Principality of Montenegro and participated in battles against the Ottoman troops, most notably at the Battle of Grahovac.

== Life ==
Miloš was born in the Upper Cuce region, in the nahiye of Katun, at the time part of the principality of Montenegro (modern Montenegro). His father was Andrija "Andro" Šunjov, of the Krivokapić brotherhood of Upper Cuce, and his mother was named Rosa (née Pejović). He had a younger brother, Janko, an industrialist.

Miloš joined the guerilla fight at a young age, and was noted for fighting the Korjenica Turks, and participating in the battles for Grahovo (1838–43). In 1843, for his services, Prince-Bishop Petar II Petrović-Njegoš employed him as a member of his personal guard, the perjanici.

In 1852, Prince Danilo awarded him the title of kapetan (captain) of the Cuce tribe, and a year later the titles of serdar of Cuce, and senator of Montenegro. He participated in the Battle of Grahovac (May 1, 1858), in which he led the Cuce battalion as serdar. He was then awarded the title vojvoda, "duke", and received the knife of Serbian revolutionary Uzun-Mirko Apostolović, which Prince Danilo had bought from Ivo Radonjić, paying 120 golden thalers, and then given to Miloš. His blood brother (pobratim) was Jole Piletić. He died in 1907, and was buried in Riđani, Nikšić.

== See also ==
- Ilija Đukanov
- Joko Savov Vukotić
- Novica Cerović
- Petar S. Vukotić, duke, leader of the Ozrinići detachment of Montenegrin Army
- Boro Stanojević, captain, leader of Bjelice detachment of Montenegrin Army
- Boško Milutinović, captain, leader Zagarač and Komani detachment of Montenegrin Army
- Pajo Kovačević, serdar, leader of Grahovo detachment of Montenegrin Army
