= Statistical regions of Montenegro =

Regions of Montenegro Statistički regioni Crne Gore Статистички региони Црне Горе
- Category: Statistical regions
- Location: Montenegro
- Number: 3 regions
- Populations: 159,642 (Northern Region); 309,556 (Central Region); 163,960 (Coastal region)
- Areas: 8,399 km² (Northern Region); 7,372 km² (Central Region); 1,591 km² (Coastal Region)
- Subdivisions: Municipality

The statistical regions of Montenegro (Montenegrin: statistički regioni Crne Gore / статистички региони Црне Горе) are defined, as of 2011, by the Montenegrin Regional Development Law (Zakon o regionalnom razvoju / Закон о регионалном развоју). The regions, as defined by law, roughly correspond to the informal and colloquial division of Montenegro, often used by the Montenegrin media and citizens.

Regions are not administrative divisions per se; they are used for statistical and analytical purposes, to help create the outline for more uniform economic development of Montenegro. This official definition of the regions of Montenegro is one of many definitions that are in everyday use in the country. However, this division into three regions is most widespread:

== List ==
Name	Area (km^{2})	Population	Density (pop./km^{2})	No. of municipalities	Map
Central region Centralni region Централни регион	4,917	279,419	56.83	6	
Coastal Region; Primorski region Приморски регион	1,591	146,784	92.26	6	
Northern Region; Sjeverni region Сјеверни регион	8,399	195,991	23.34	13	

== Central Region ==
This region consists of six municipalities. It is the most populous of the regions, and contains the capital of Podgorica, the historical capital of Cetinje, and the industrial center of Nikšić. Most of the Montenegrin economic, cultural, educational and administration base is located within the region.

Prominent tribal, historical and geographical subregions in the central region are: Nikšići (Župa, Rudine), Golija, Banjani, Grahovo, Krivošije, Brda (Piperi, Rovca, Bratonožići, Kuči, Bjelopavlići, Lijeva rijeka), Zeta (Upper and Lower), Skenderija, Malesija, Old Montenegro (Pješivci, Čevo, Cuce, Bjelice, Njeguši, Cetinje field, Ceklin, Komani, Zagarač, Lješani and Rijeka).

Municipality	Area		Population (2023)		Ethnic majority	Predominant language	Predominant religion
Municipality	km^{2}	Rank	Total	Rank	Ethnic majority	Predominant language	Predominant religion
Cetinje	899	3	14,494	4	Montenegrin	Montenegrin	Eastern Orthodox
Danilovgrad	501	4	18,617	3	Montenegrin	Serbian	Eastern Orthodox
Nikšić	2,065	1	65,705	2	Montenegrin	Serbian	Eastern Orthodox
Podgorica	1,399	2	179,505	1	Montenegrin	Serbian	Eastern Orthodox
Tuzi	236	5	12,979	6	Albanian	Albanian	Sunni Islam
Zeta	153	6	16,071	5	Montenegrin	Serbian	Eastern Orthodox

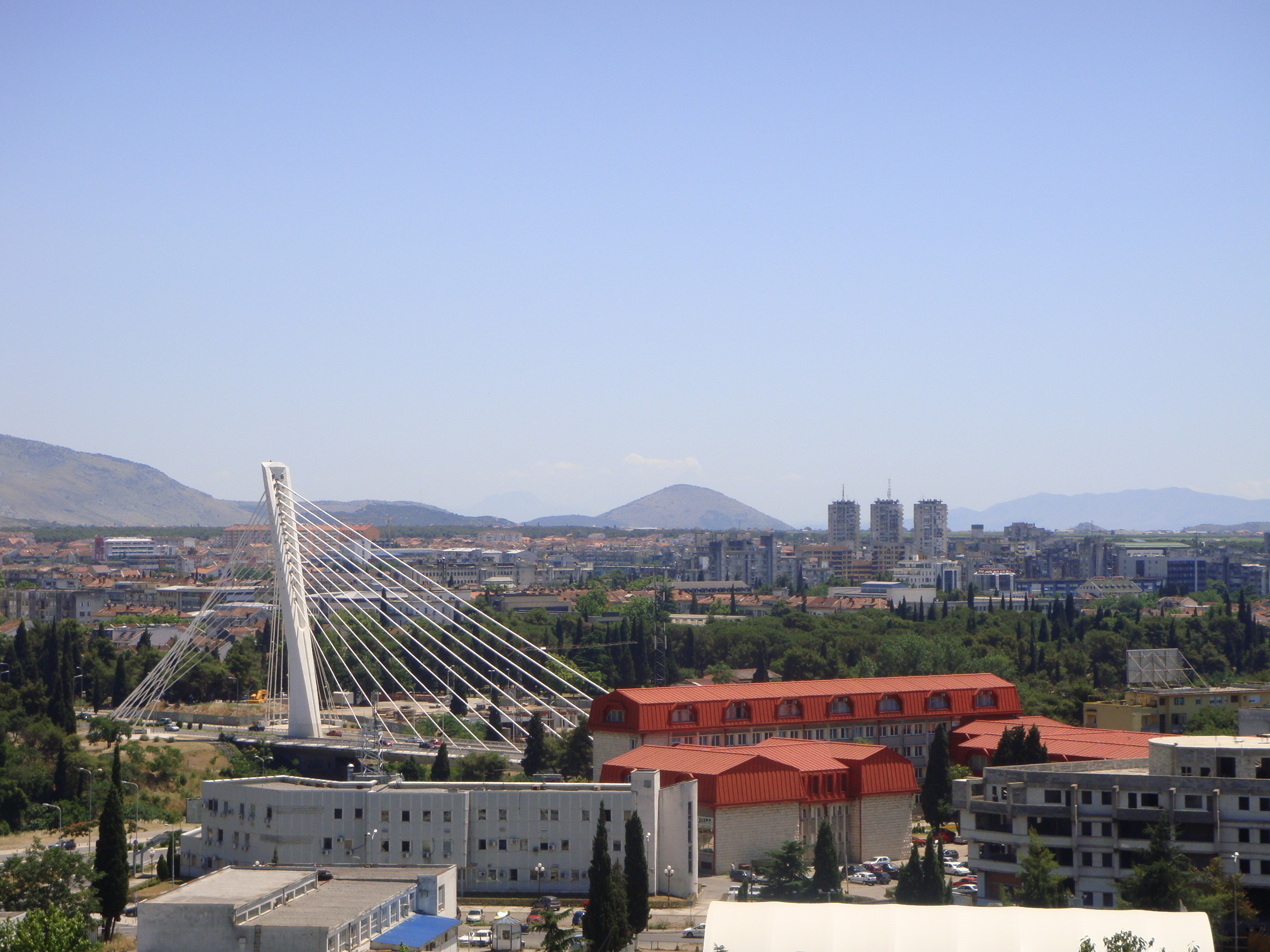
Podgorica

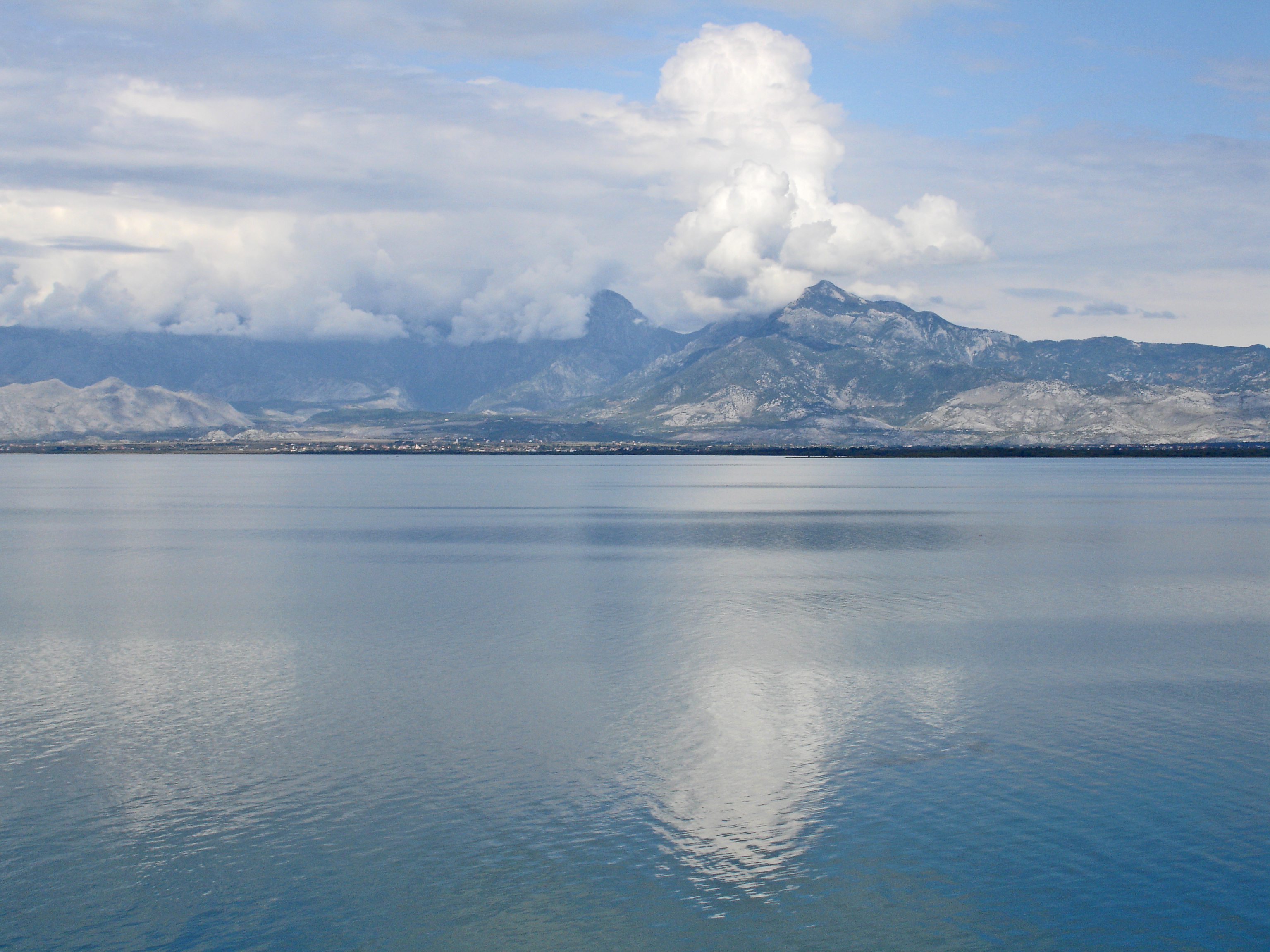
Lake Skadar

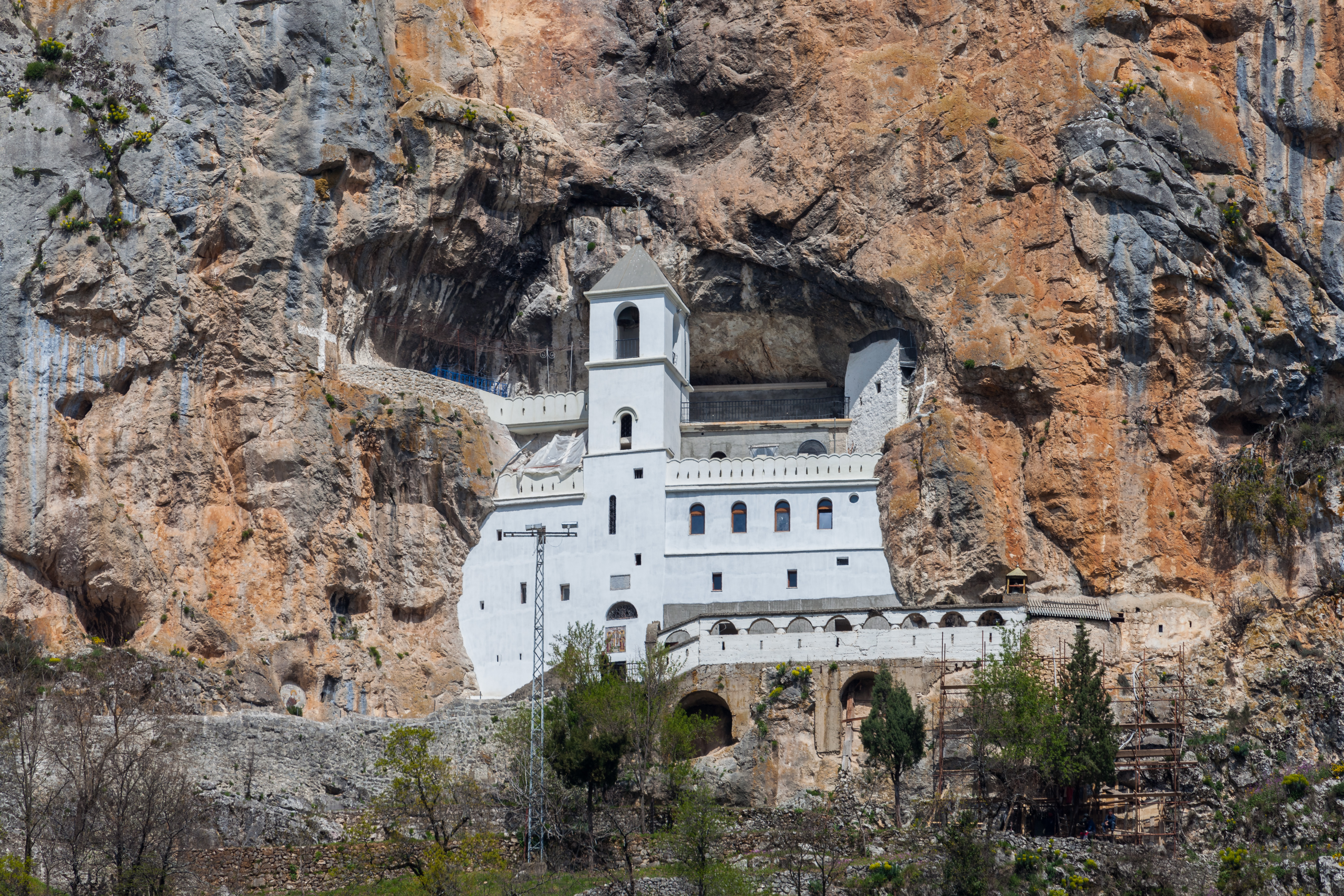
Ostrog Monastery

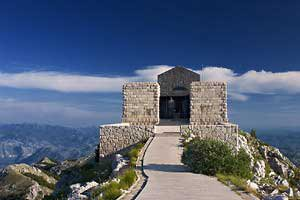
Njegoš's Mausoleum

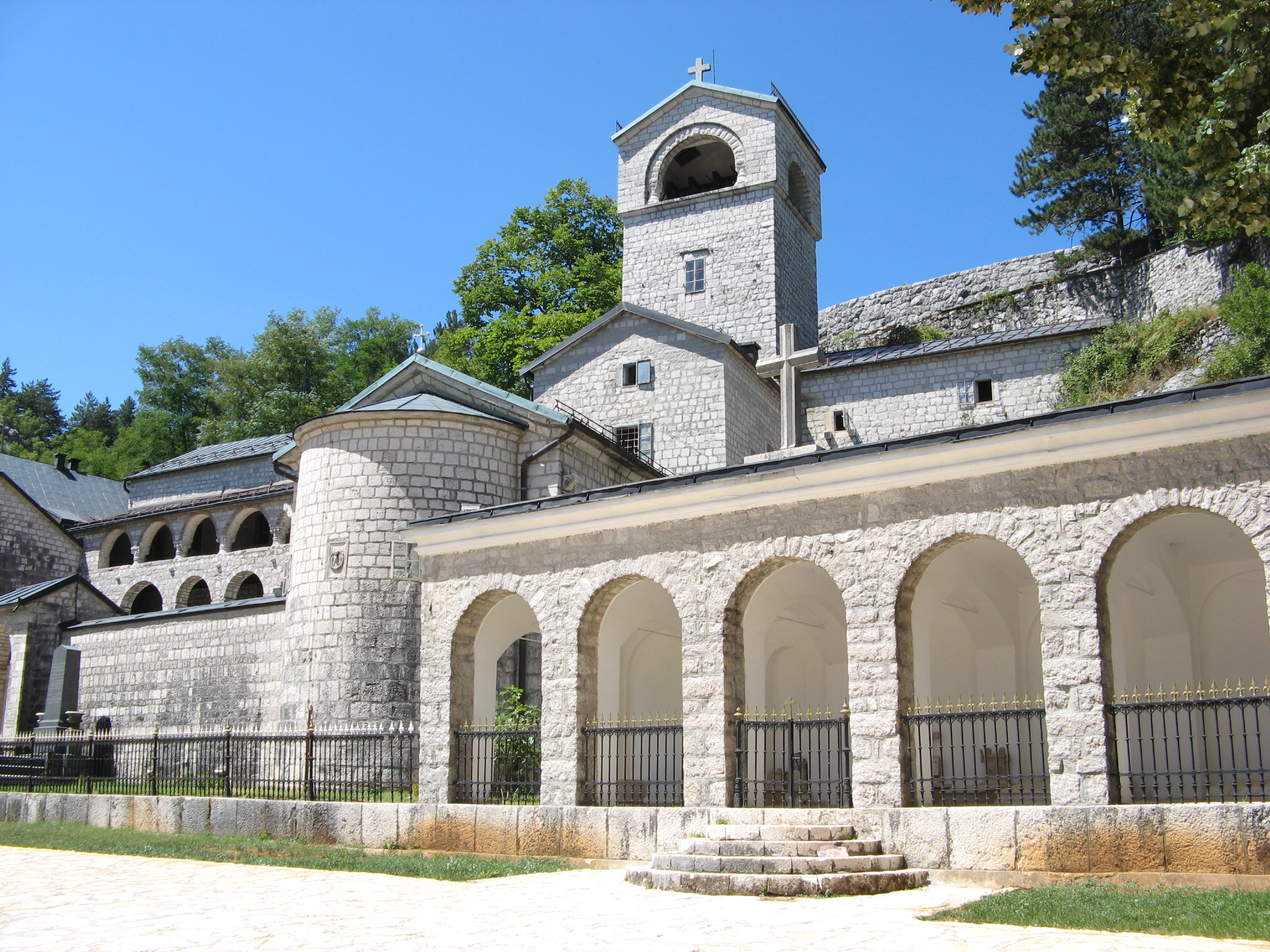
Cetinje monastery

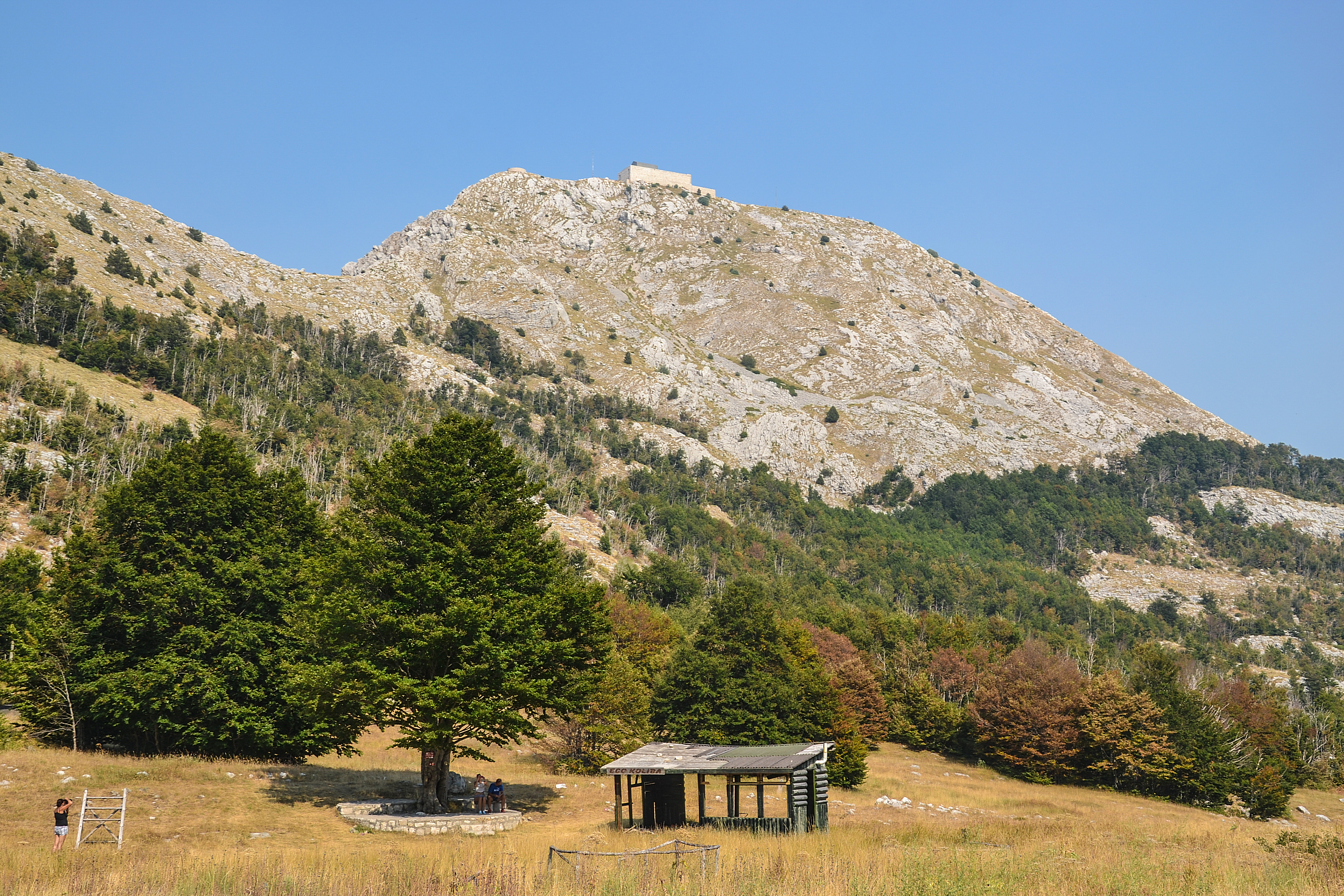
Lovćen

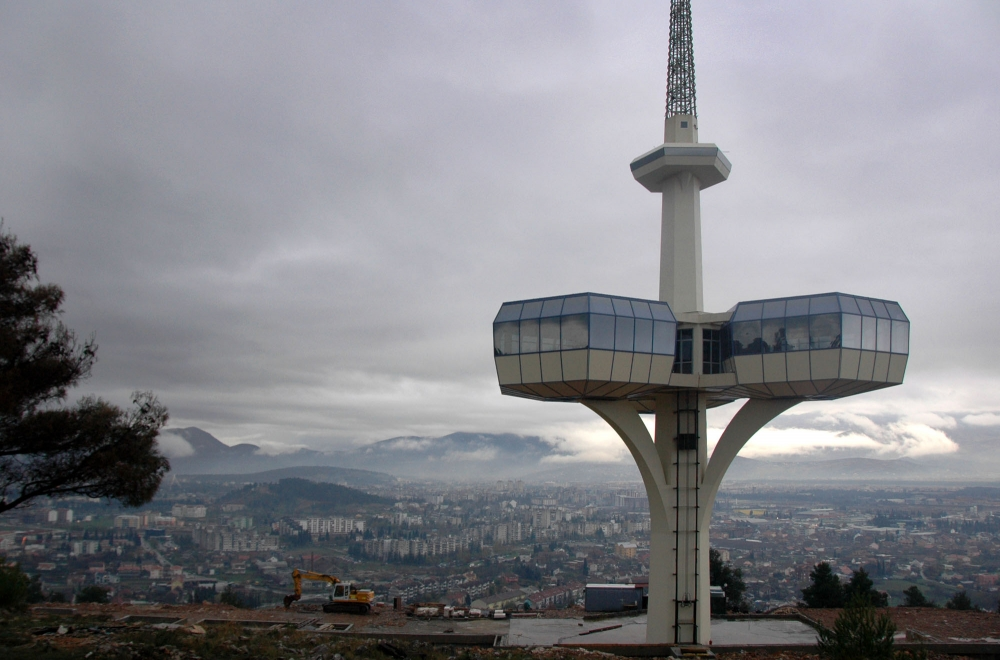
Podgorica

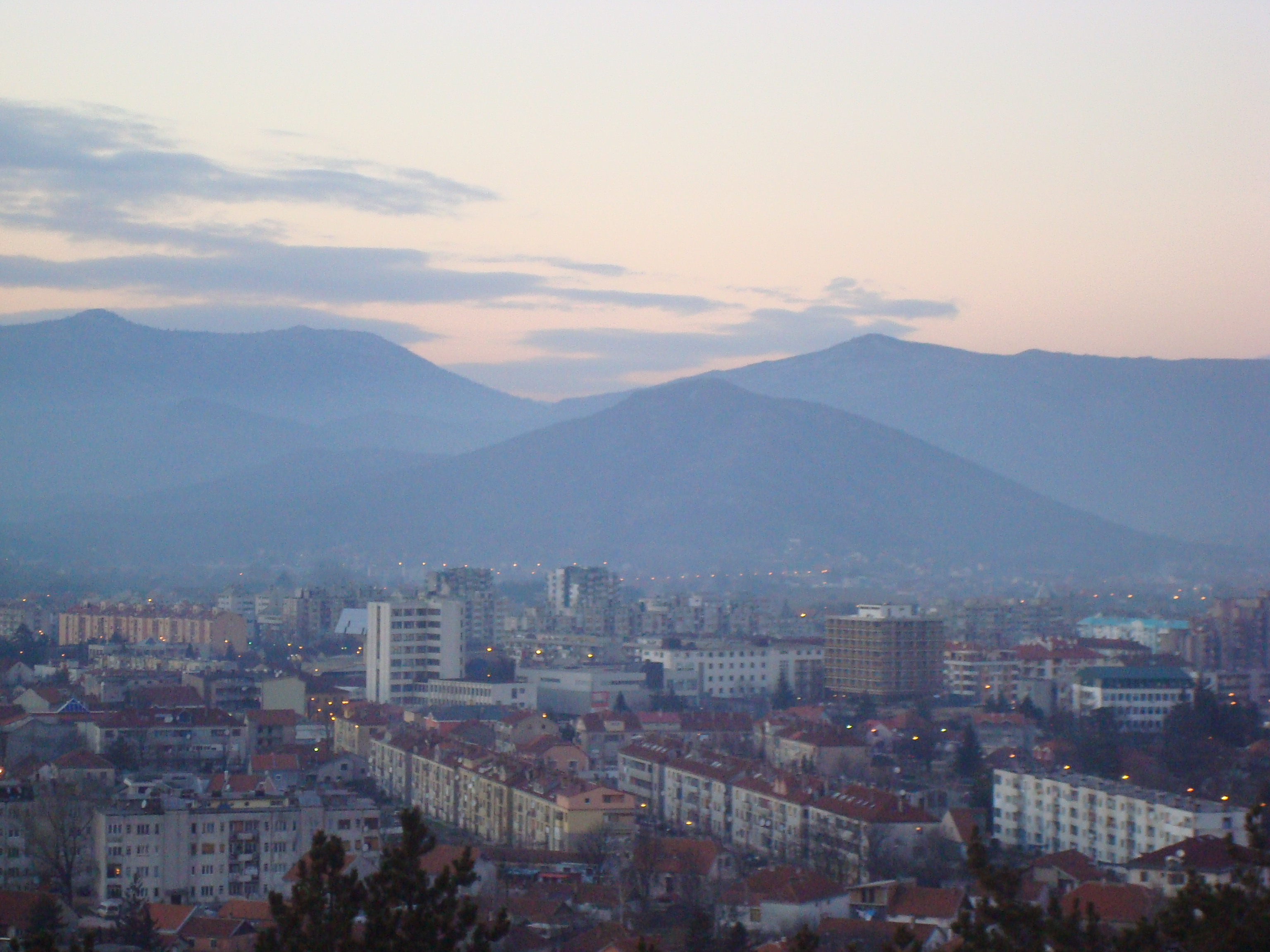
Nikšić

== Coastal Region ==
This southernmost region consists of municipalities with access to the Adriatic Sea. This region is mainly oriented towards tourism, and has a population of 146,784 (2003). Following municipalities make up the region:

Prominent tribal, historical and geographical subregions of the coastal statistical region are: Bay of Kotor, Grbalj, Budva riviera, Pobori, Brajići, Maine, Paštrovići, Spič, Crmnica, Bar, Mrkojevići, Ulcinj riviera and Skadarska Krajina.

Municipality	Area		Population		Ethnic majority	Predominant language	Predominant religion
Municipality	km^{2}	Rank	Total	Rank	Ethnic majority	Predominant language	Predominant religion
Bar	598	1	42,368	1	Montenegrin	Montenegrin	Eastern Orthodox
Budva	122	5	19,170	5	Serb	Serbian	Eastern Orthodox
Herceg Novi	235	4	30,992	2	Serb	Serbian	Eastern Orthodox
Kotor	335	2	22,799	3	Montenegrin	Serbian	Eastern Orthodox
Tivat	46	6	14,111	6	Serb	Serbian	Eastern Orthodox
Ulcinj	255	3	20,265	4	Albanian	Albanian	Sunni Islam

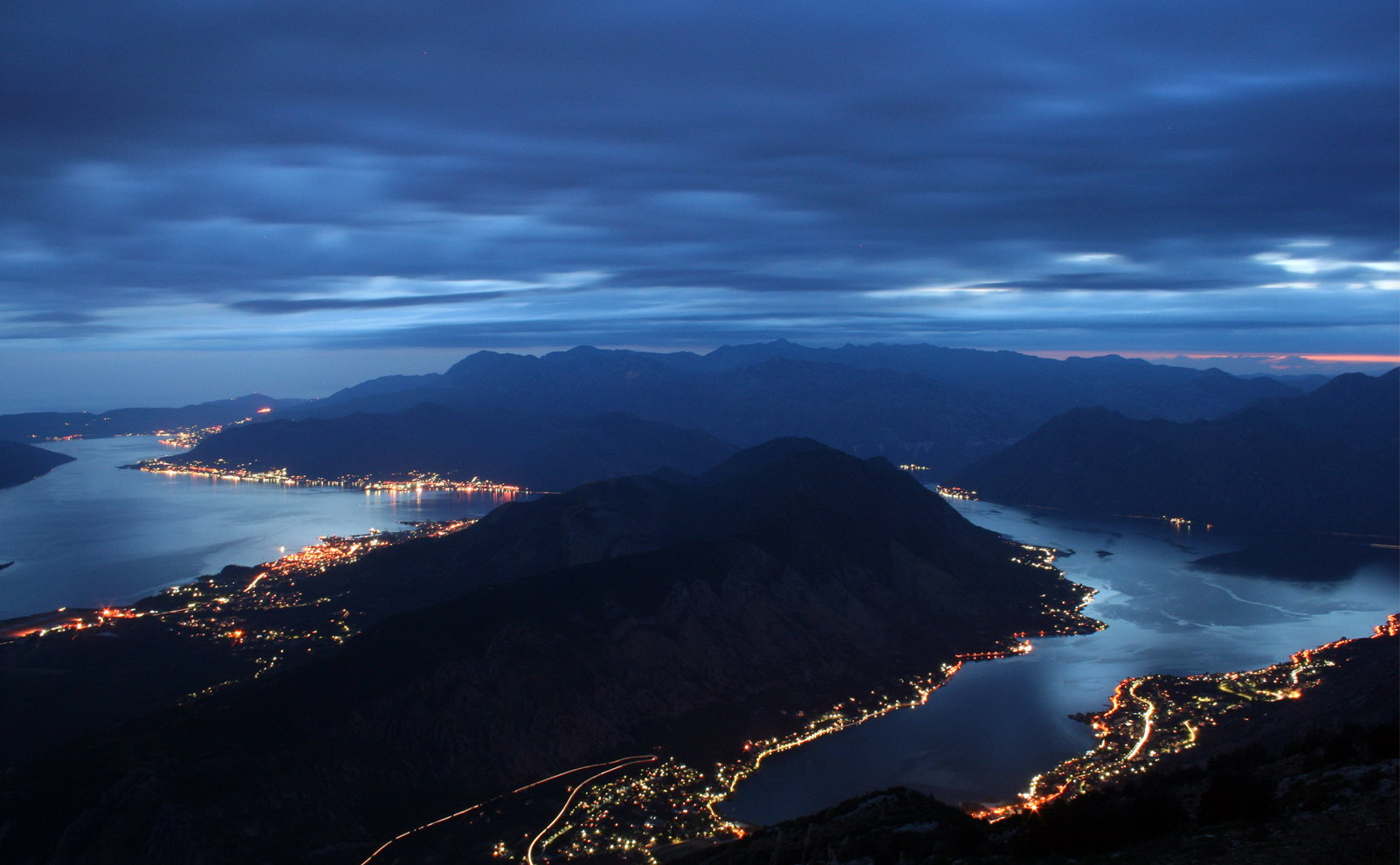
Bay of Kotor

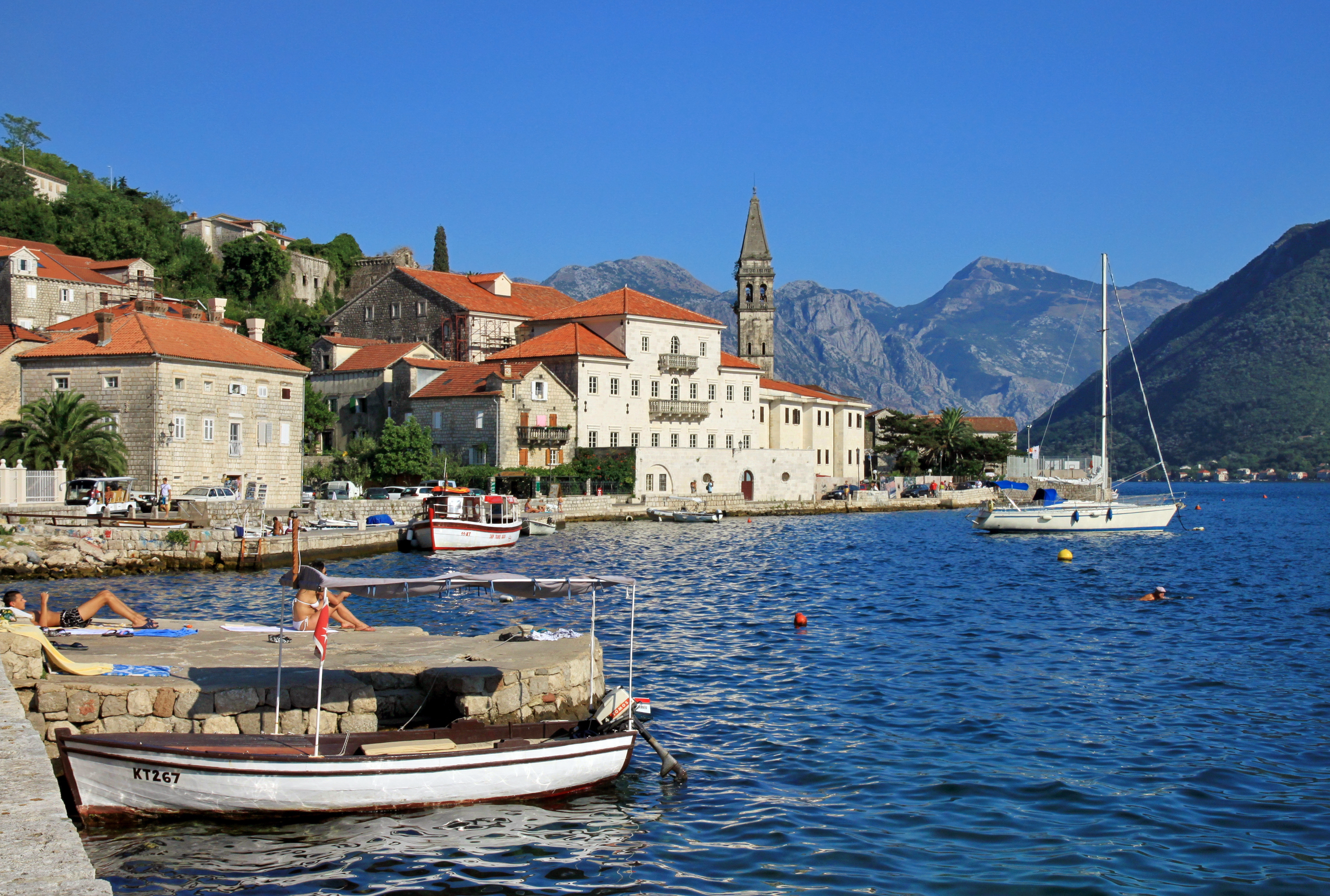
Perast

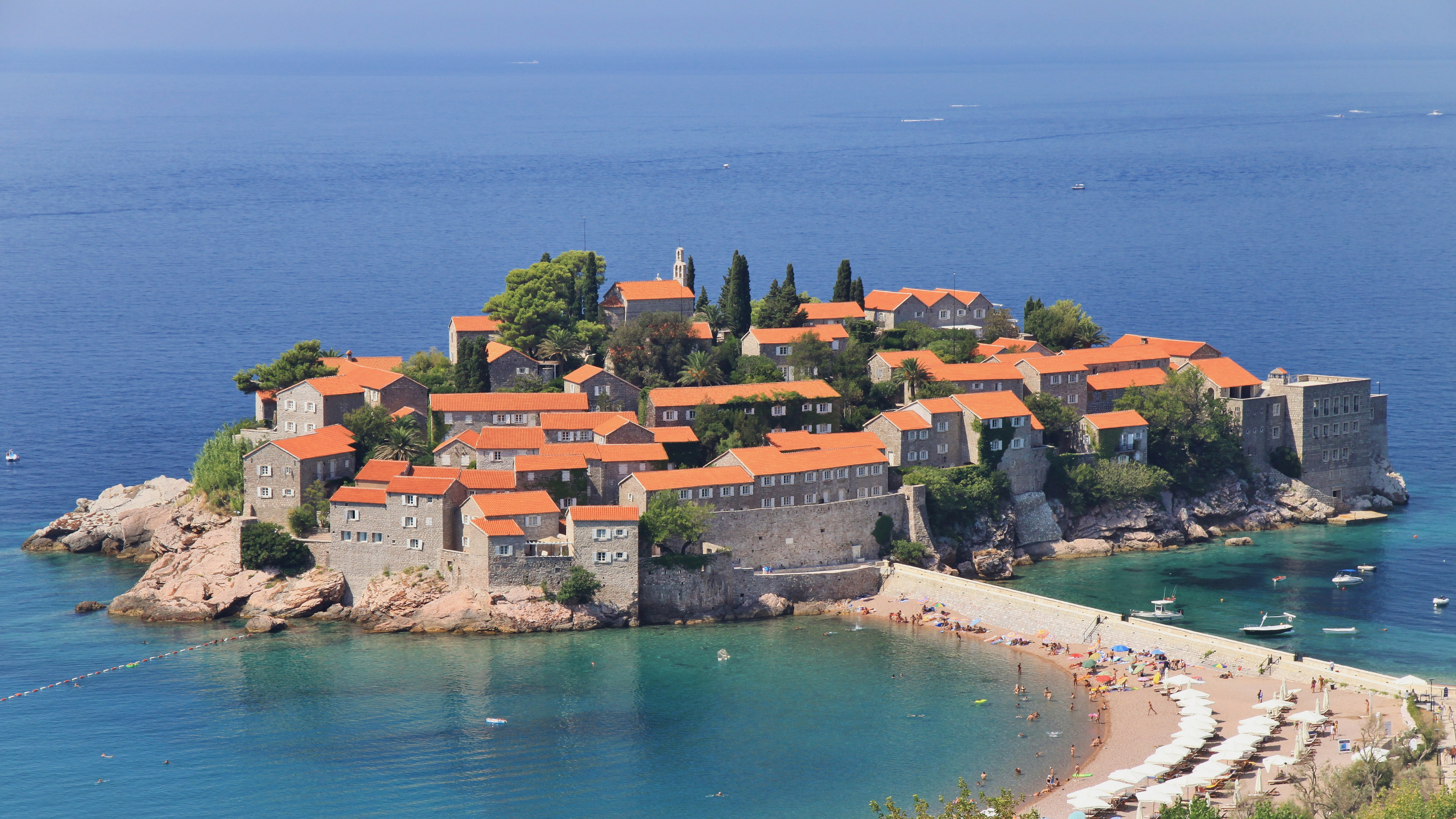
Sveti Stefan

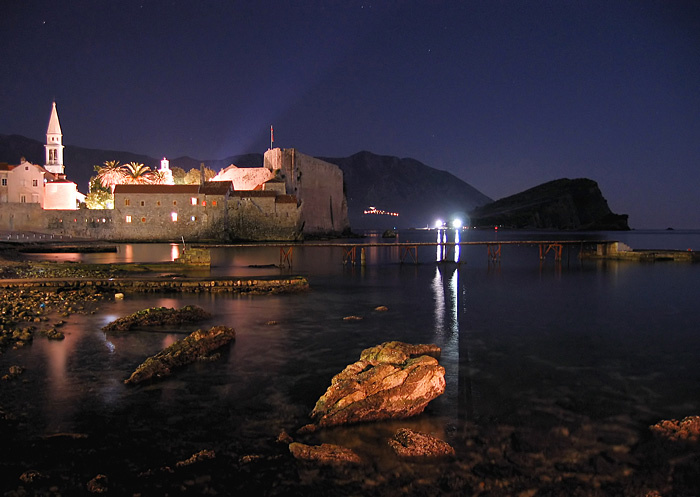
Budva

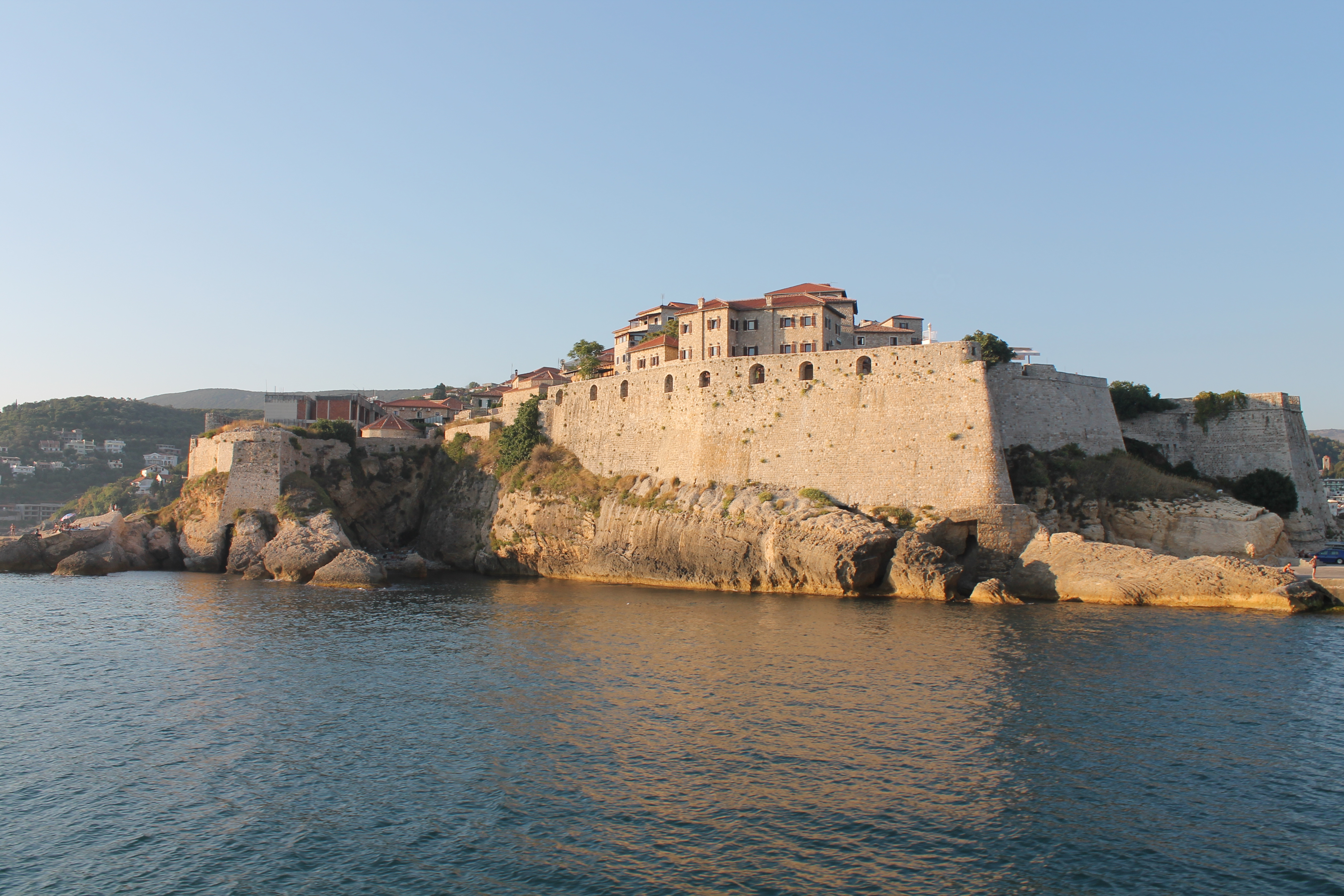
Ulcinj

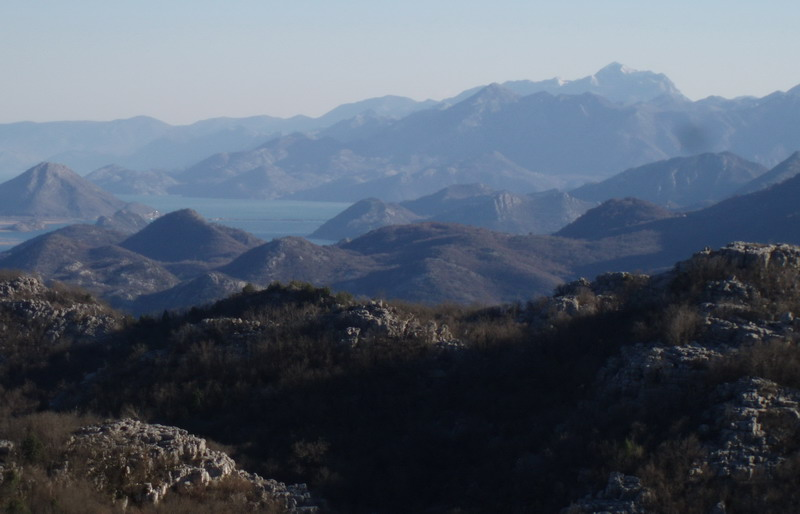
Rumija

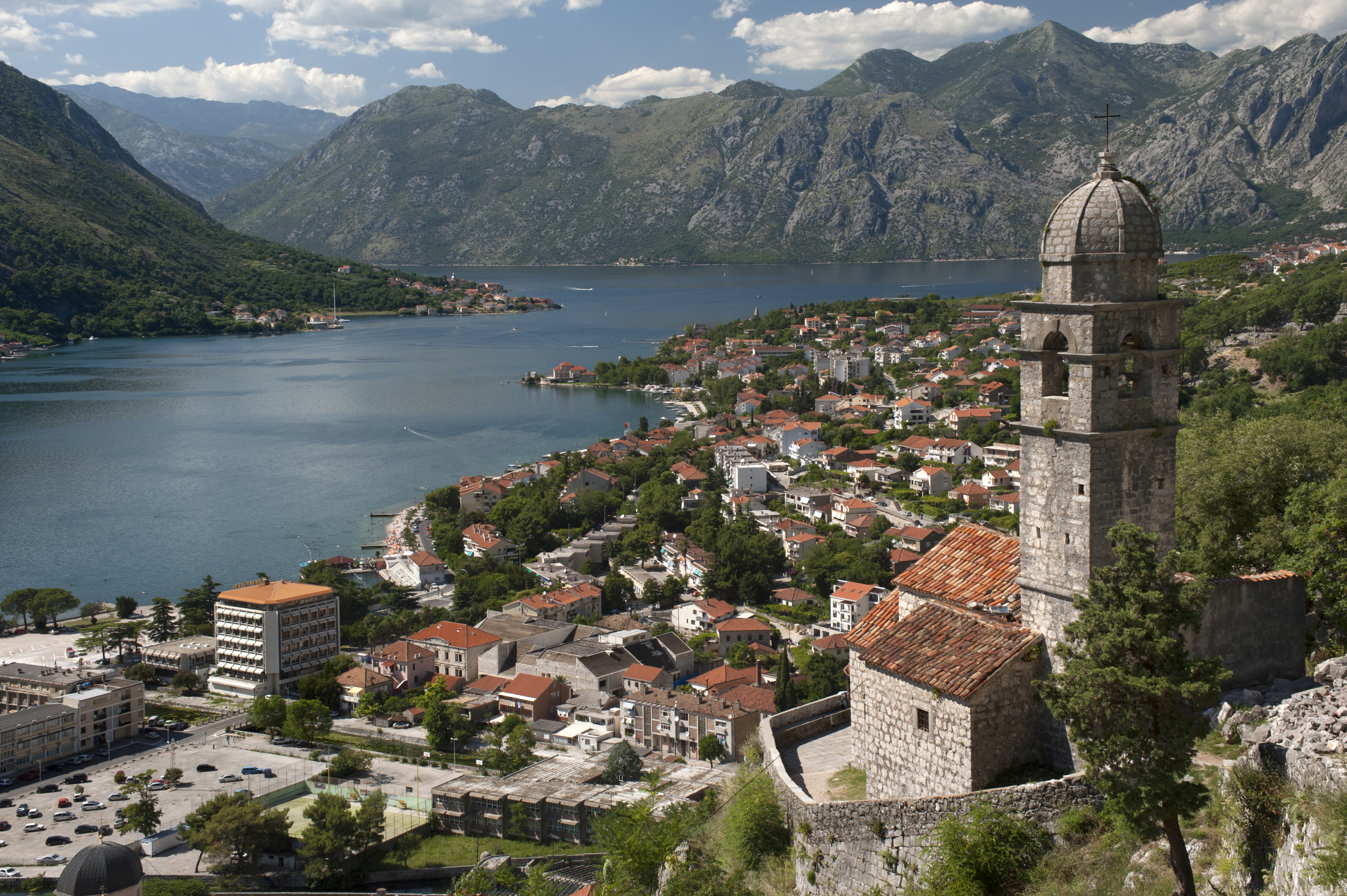
Kotor

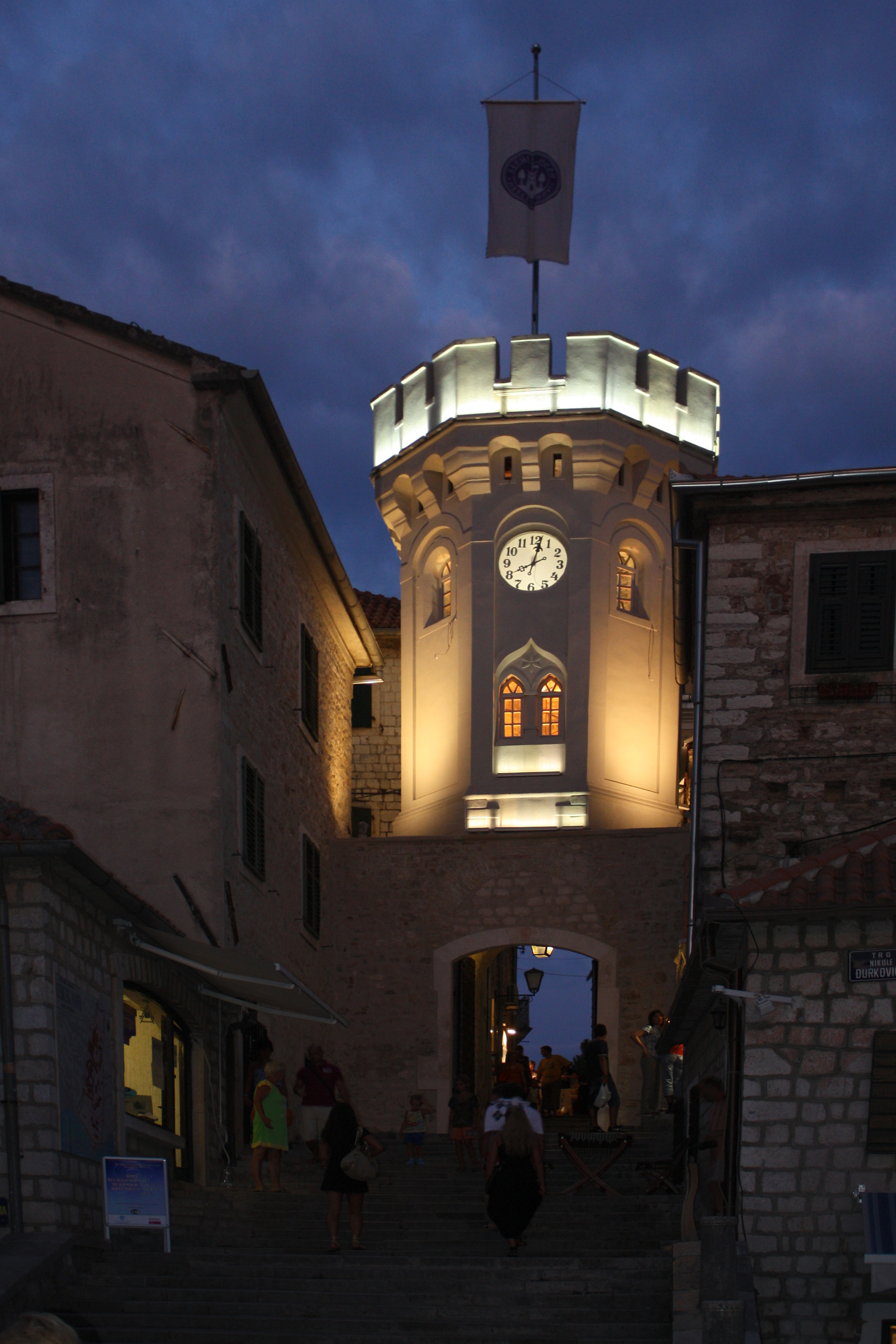
Herceg Novi

== Northern Region ==
Northern region comprises eleven municipalities and is the largest by area. It encompasses the sparsely populated mountainous part of Montenegro. With the decline of the heavy industries in the 1990s, the region has seen perpetual economic hardship and migration of the population to the two southern regions.

Prominent tribal, historical and geographical subregions of the northern statistical region are: Drobnjak (Uskoci, Jezera, Šaranci), Zatarje, Pljevlja, Piva, Brda (Morača (Upper and Lower), Vasojevići), Polja, Kolašin (Upper and Lower), Southern Sanjak, Plav and Gusinje, Bihor (Upper and Lower), Polimlje and Potarje.

Municipality	Area		Population (2023)	
Municipality	km^{2}	Rank	Total	Rank
Andrijevica	283	12	3,978	10
Berane	544	6	25,162	3
Bijelo Polje	924	2	39,710	1
Gusinje	486	8	4,662	9
Kolašin	897	3	6,765	7
Mojkovac	367	11	6,824	6
Petnjica	173	13	5,552	8
Plav	486	7	10,378	5
Plužine	854	4	2,232	12
Pljevlja	1,346	1	24,542	4
Rožaje	432	10	25,247	2
Šavnik	553	5	1,588	13
Žabljak	445	9	3,002	11

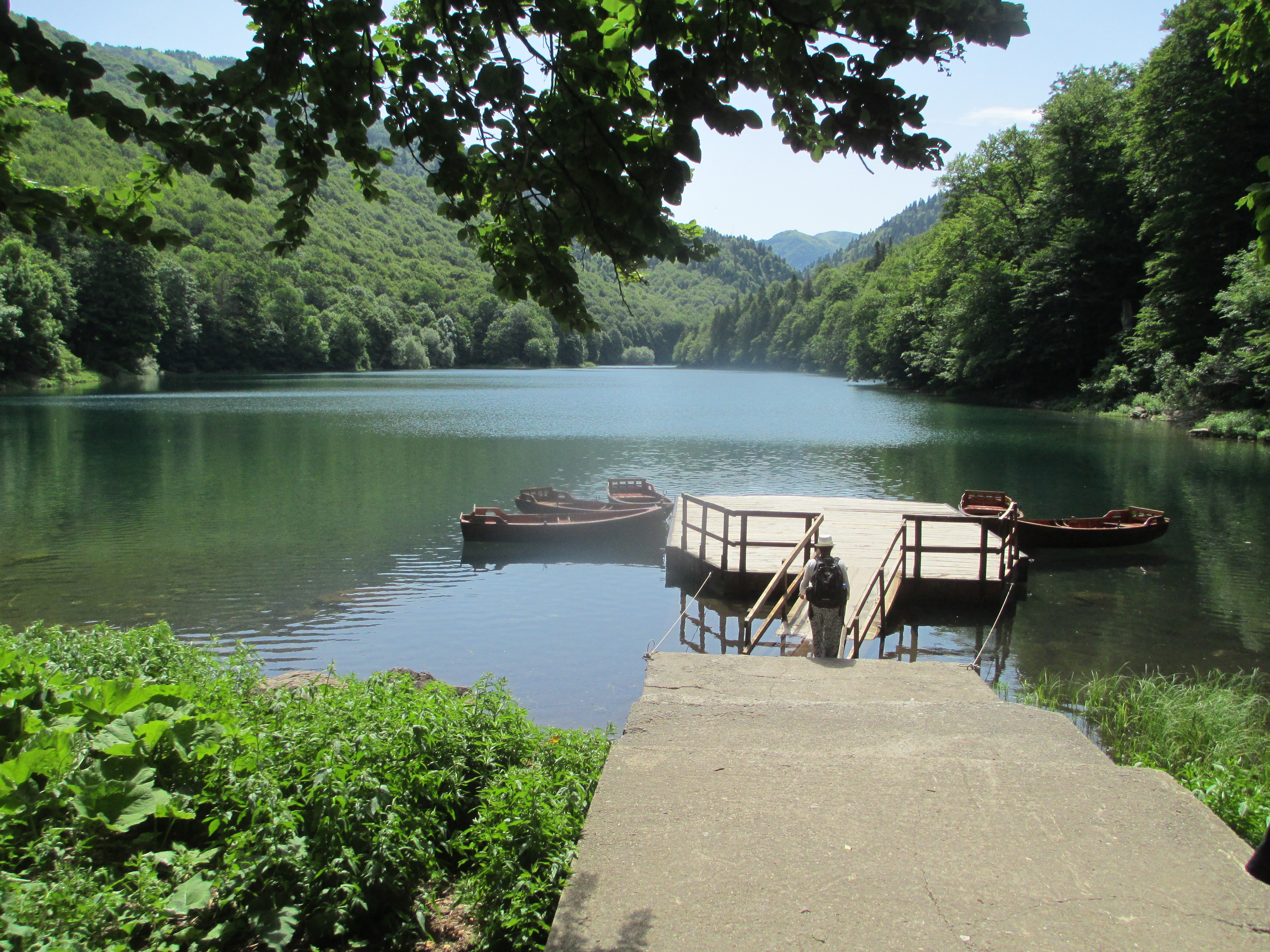
Biogradska Gora

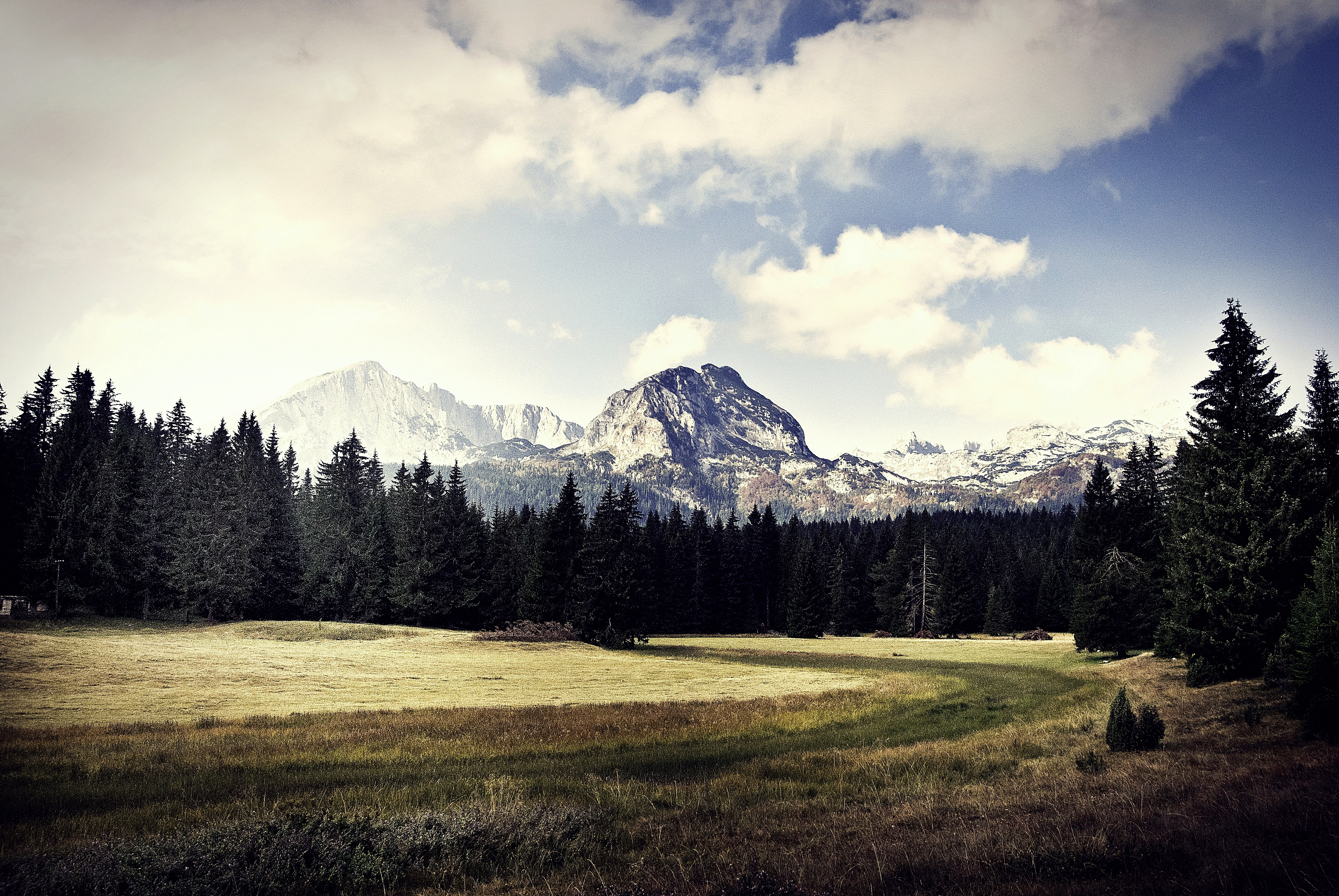
Durmitor

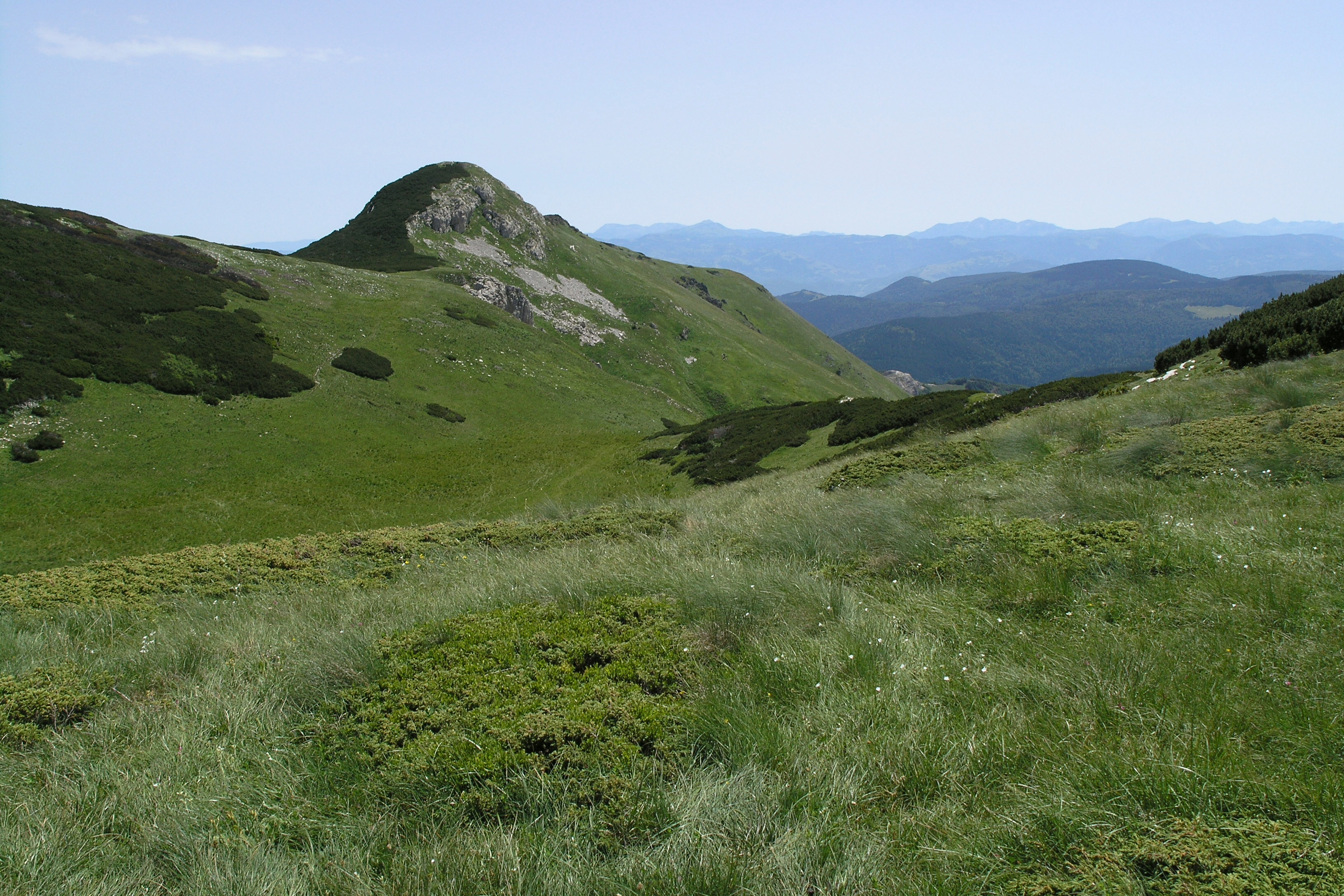
Bjelasica

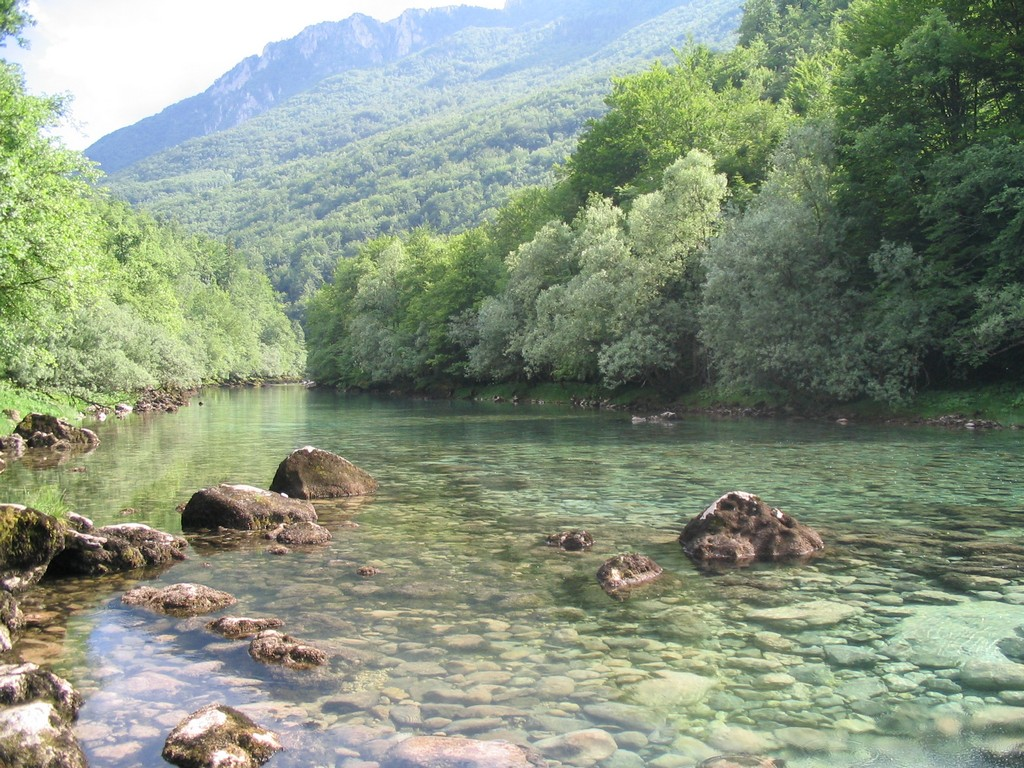
Piva River

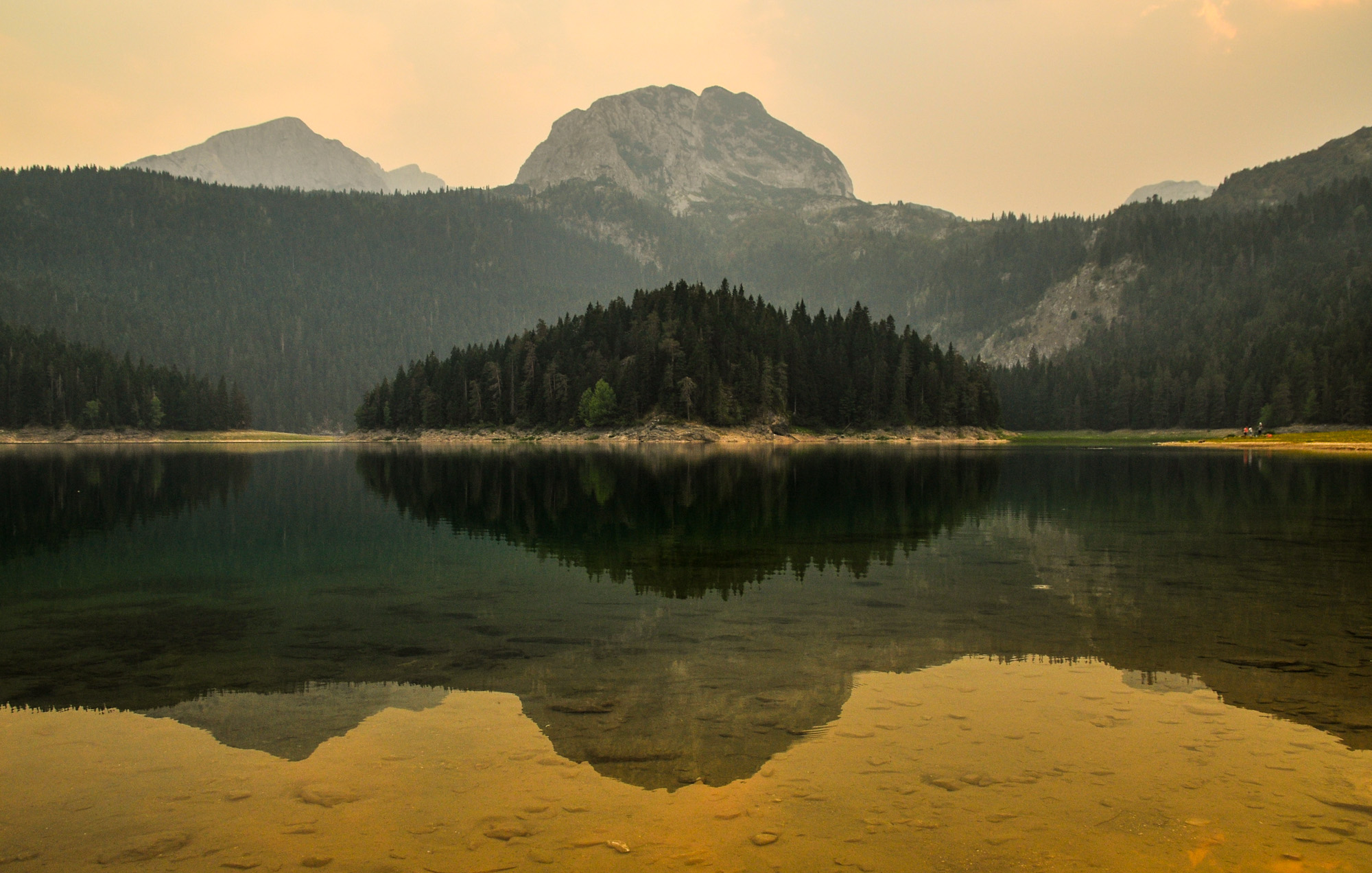
Black Lake

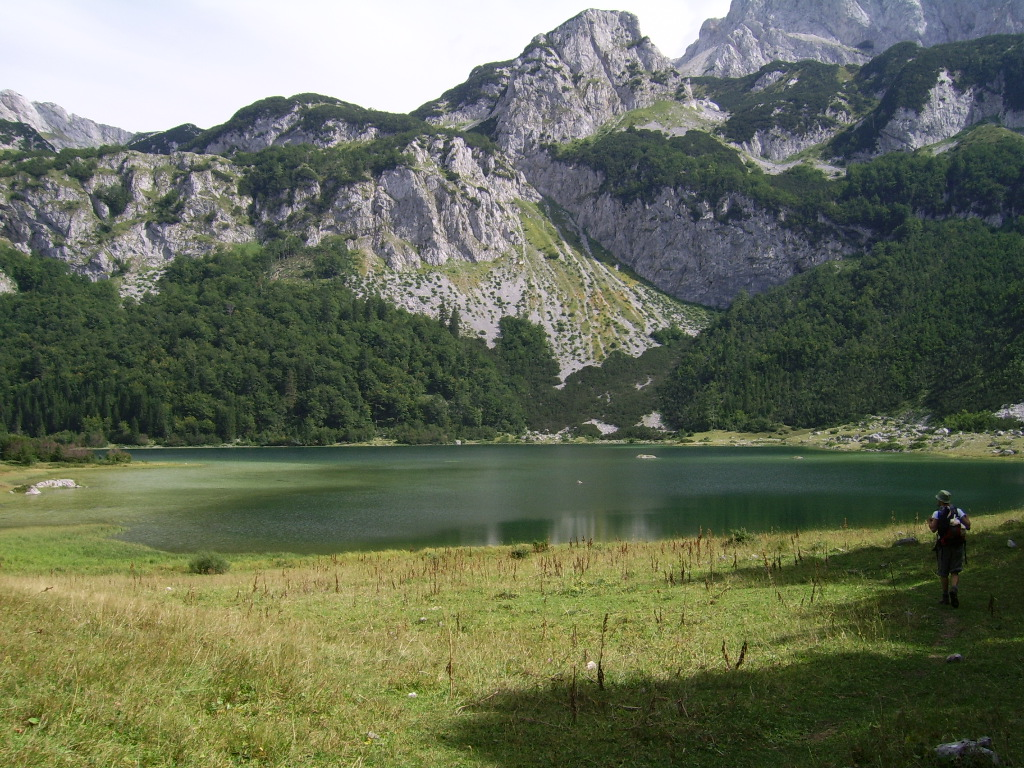
Trnovačko Lake

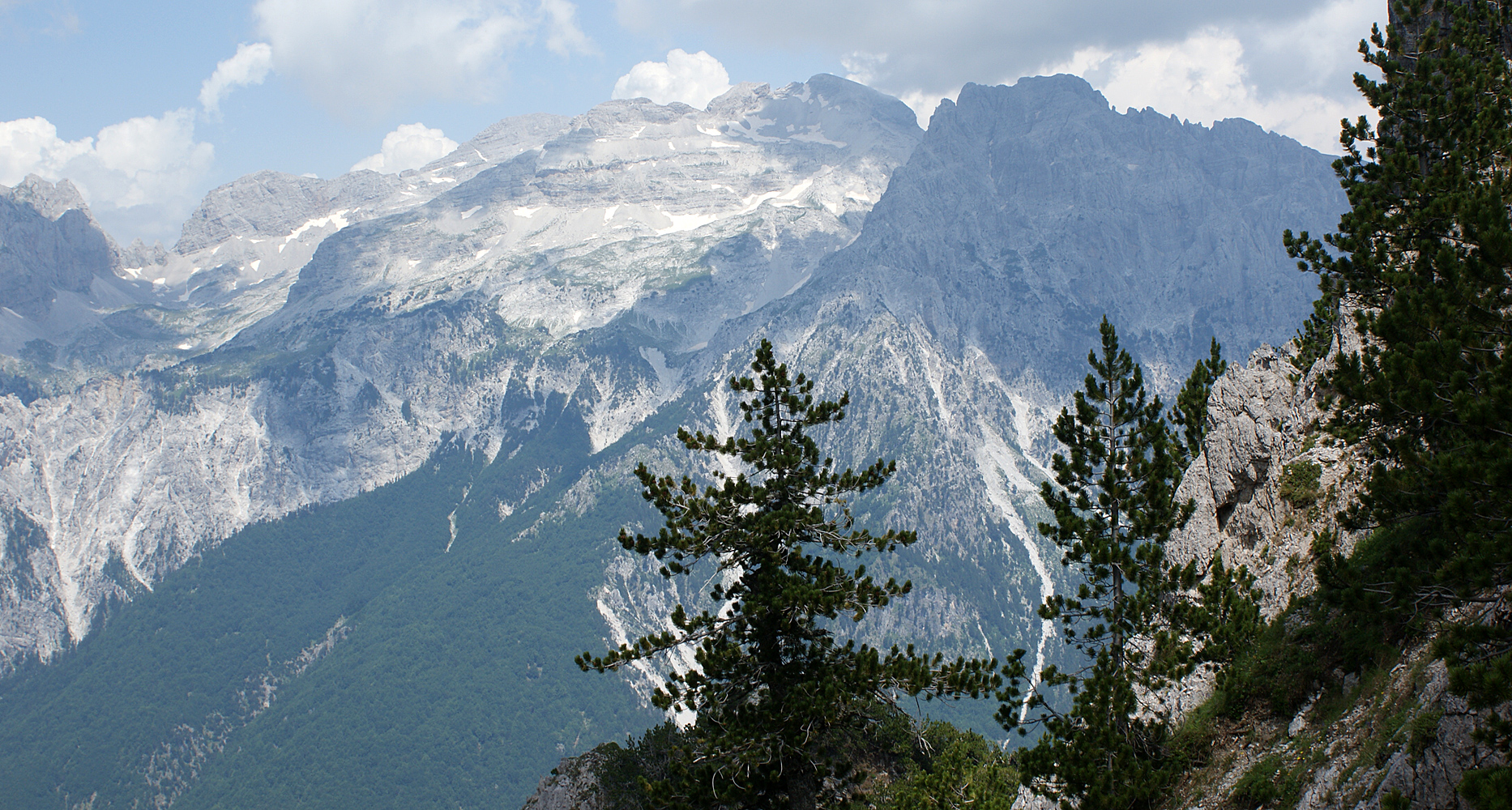
Prokletije

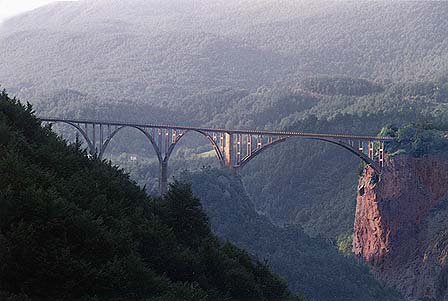
Đurđevića Tara Bridge

== See also ==
- Northern Montenegro
- Coastal Montenegro
- Geography of Montenegro
- Tourism in Montenegro
- List of national parks of Montenegro
- Municipalities of Montenegro
