= Jovović =

Jovović Serbian Cyrillic: Јововић is a Serbian surname, which means little son of Jovo.

- Blagoje Jovović
- Boško Jovović
- Igor Jovović
- Mirjana Jovović-Horvat
- Nebojša Jovović
- Nikola Jovović
- Vladimir Jovović

== See also ==
- Jovovich (disambiguation)
- Yovovich
