= Central Montenegro =

Central Montenegro Centralni Crne Gore Централни Црне Горе
- Region in Montenegro
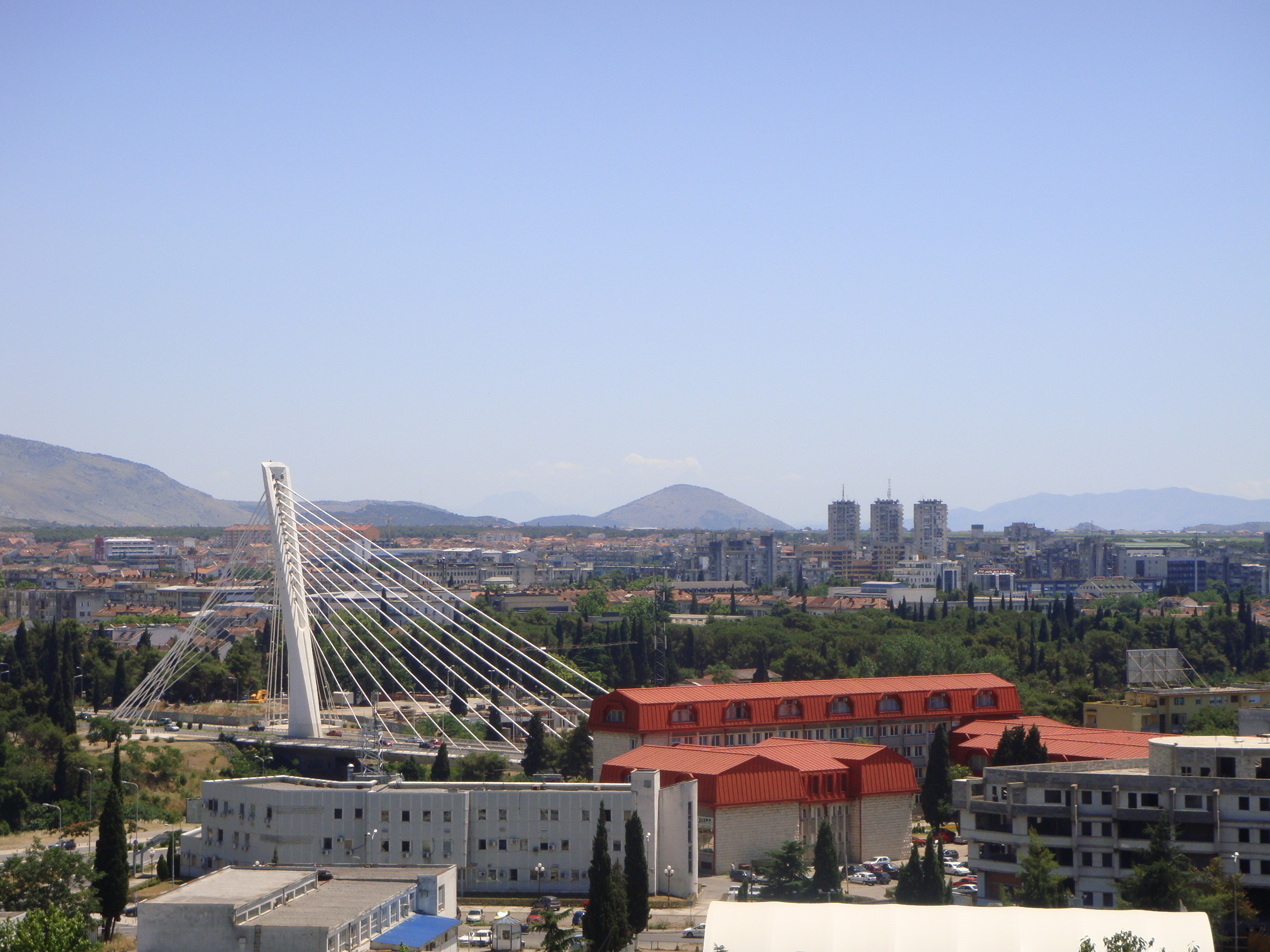
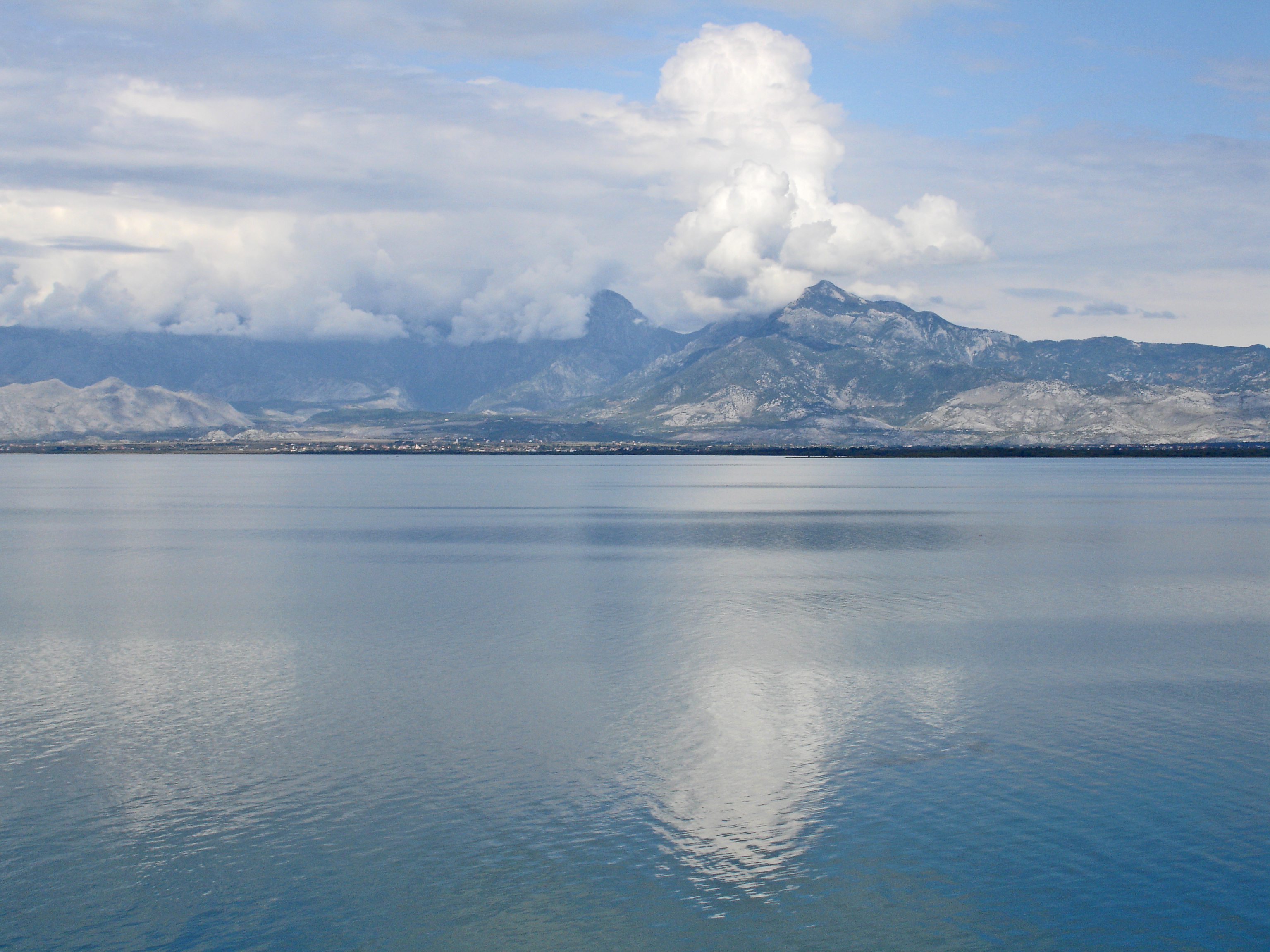
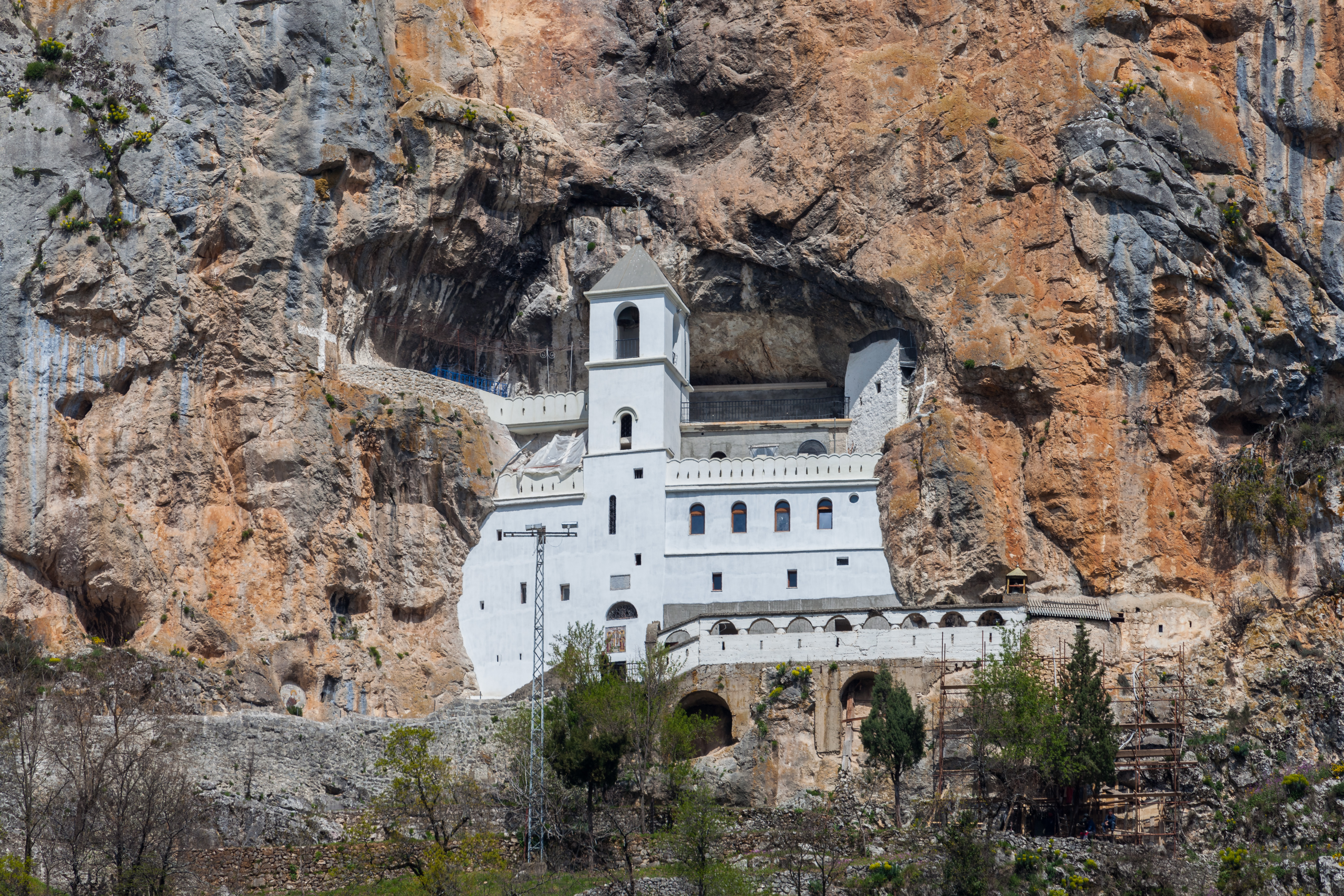
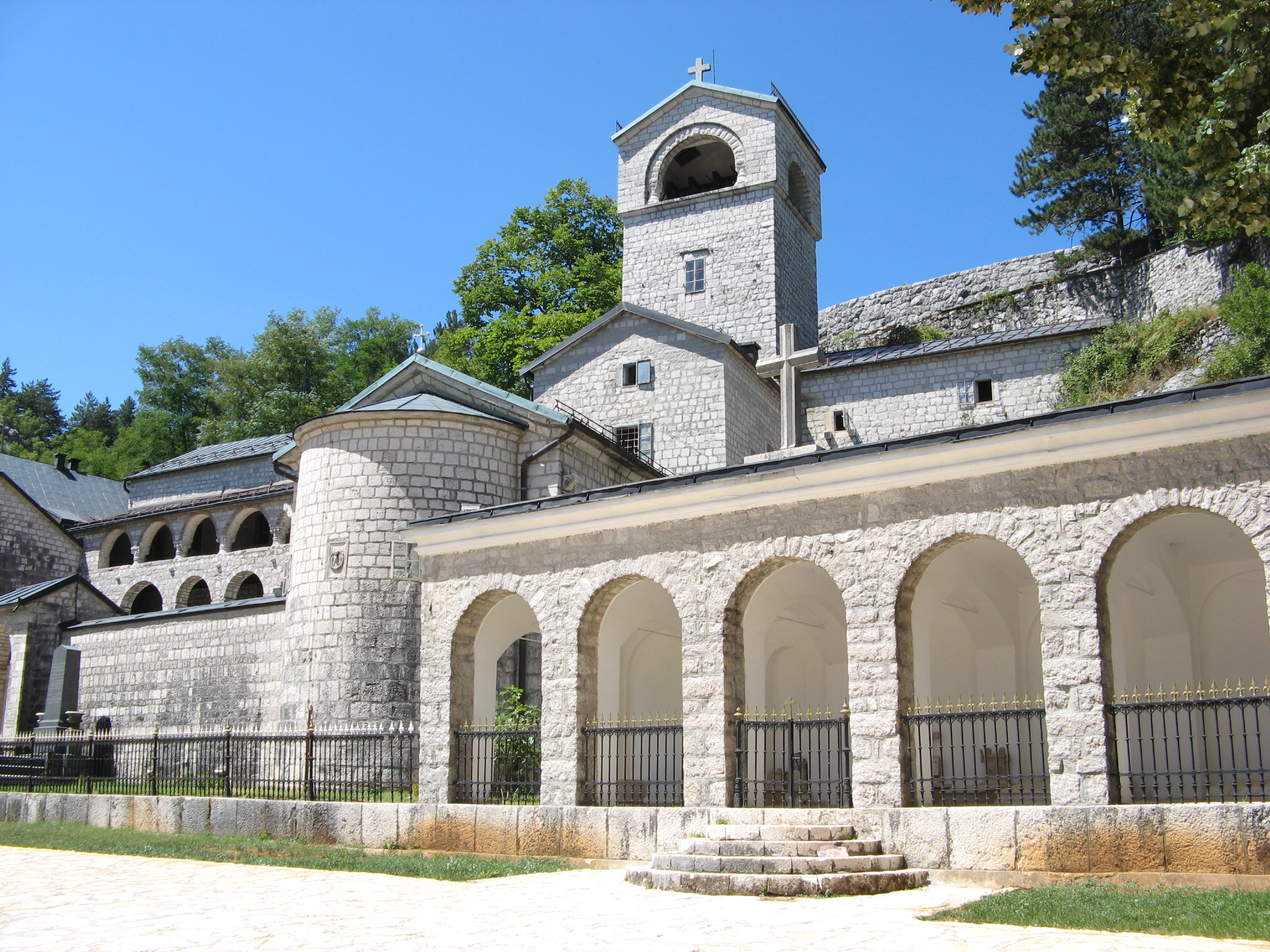
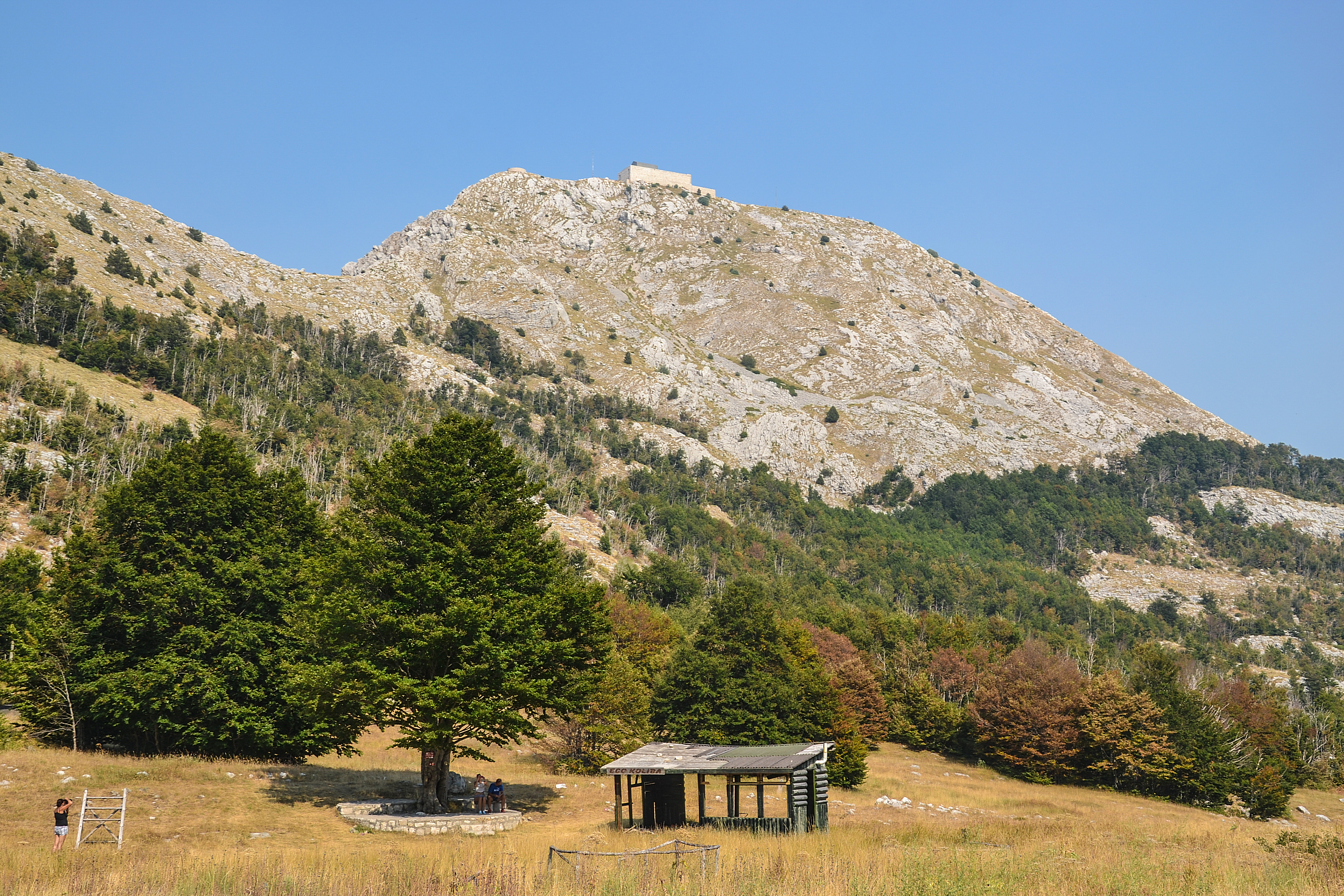
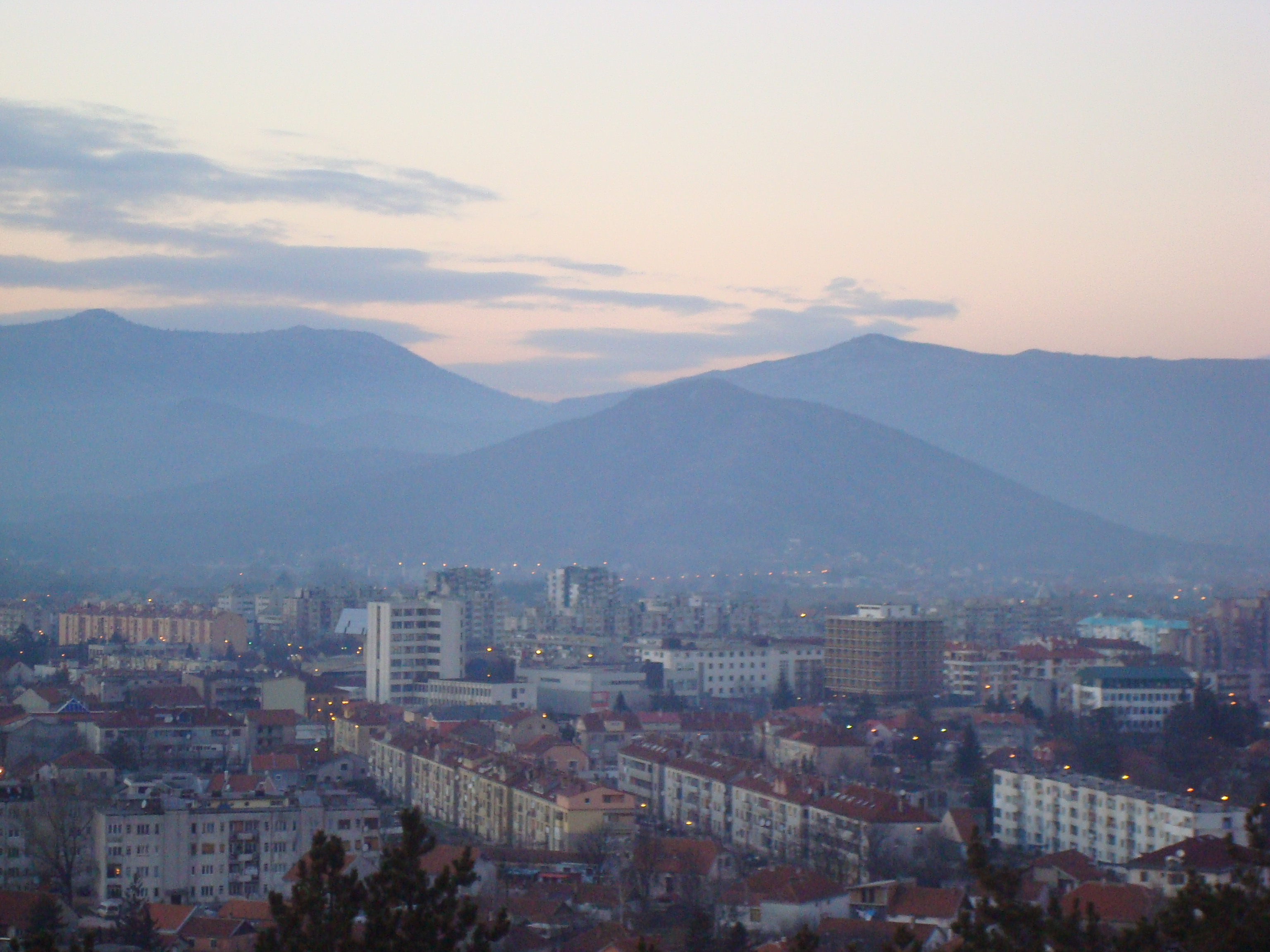
- Podgorica Lake Skadar Ostrog Monastery Cetinje monastery Lovćen Nikšić

- Central Montenegro
- Country: Montenegro
- Established: 2006
- Largest city: Podgorica
- Municipalities: 6: Cetinje; Danilovgrad; Nikšić; Podgorica; Tuzi; Zeta

Area
  - Total: 4,917 km^{2} (1,898 sq mi)

Population
  - Total: 307,371
  - Density: 62.51/km^{2} (161.9/sq mi)
- Time zone: UTC+1 (CET)
  - Summer (DST): UTC+2 (CEST)
- HDI: 0.853 (2022) very high · 1st

Central Montenegro (Montenegrin: Centralni Crne Gore / Централни Црне Горе) is one of three statistical regions in Montenegro. It comprises the central regions of the country, including the capital city of Podgorica and the historic capital city of Cetinje. Spread over an area of 4,917 km^{2} (1,898 sq mi), the region incorporates six municipalities. It is sandwiched between the other two regions of Montenegro (Northern and Coastal) and shares international land borders with Bosnia and Herzegovina in the northwest, and Albania in the southeast. The region had a population of just over 0.3 million in 2024, making it the most populous statistical region in the country.

== History ==
The region was under the control of Ottoman Empire in the late Middle Ages. It became part of the independent kingdom of Montenegro from 1910 to 1918 with the capital at Cetinje. It became part of Yugoslavia in 1929. The capital was moved to Podgorica in 1946. It became part of Serbia and Montenegro in 1991 after the dissolution of Yugoslavia. The region became part of the independent country of Montenegro in 2006.

In 2007, following the adoption of the Constitution of Montenegro, the municipalities were established along with the capital city of Podgorica and the historic capital city of Cetinje. In 2011, the Central region was establishes as one of the three statistical regions by the Regional Developmental Law enacted by the Parliament of Montenegro. The central region consisted of Podgorica, Cetinje, the municipalities of Danilovgrad, and Nikšić, and the urban areas of Tuzi and Golubovci. Tuzi Municipality was carved from the capital territory in 2018. In 2022, Zeta Municipality was established from the territory surrounding Golubovci.

== Administration ==
Montenegro is divided into three statistical regions–Northern, Central, and Coastal. These regions do not have any administrative functions and serve for statistical purposes only. For local administration, the country is divided into 25 municipalities including the capital city of Podgorica and the historic capital city of Cetinje.

The central region incorporates six municipalities–Cetinje, Danilovgrad, Nikšić, Podgorica, Tuzi, and Zeta. These municipalities have their own regional councils.

Municipalities
Municipality	Code	Native name	Capital	Area (km^{2})	Population (2023)
Cetinje	CET	Цетиње	Cetinje	910	14,494
Danilovgrad	DAN	Даниловград	Danilovgrad	501	18,617
Nikšić	NIK	Никшић	Nikšić	2,065	65,705
Podgorica	POD	Подгорица	Podgorica	1,047	179,505
Tuzi	TUZ	Тузи	Tuzi	242	12,979
Zeta	ZET	Зета	Golubovci	152	16,071

== Geography ==
Spread over an area of 4,917 km^{2} (1,898 sq mi), the region incorporates the central areas of the country. It is sandwiched between the other two regions of Montenegro (Northern and Coastal) and shares international land borders with Bosnia and Herzegovina in the northwest, and Albania in the southeast. The region is located close to the coast of the Adriatic Sea, and experiences a typical Mediterranean climate. The region consists of the Skadar Lake, shared with Albania.

== Demographics ==
The region had a population of just over 0.3 million in 2024, making it the most populous statistical region in the country. Nearly half of the population of the country resided in the region, with the capital region of Podgorica home to nearly 180,000 people. Montenegrin people formed the major ethnicity in five of the six municipalities in the region, with Serbian being the most spoken language. Albanians, who spoke Albania, formed the majority in Tuzi. With a high HDI, the region is the most developed in the country.
