= Yovovich =

Yovovich is a Slavic surname 'Йовович'. Notable people with the surname include:

- Kiril Yovovich (1905–1976), Bulgarian footballer

== See also ==
- Jovovich (disambiguation) - another transliteration
