= Đuričić =

Đuričić (Serbian Cyrillic: Ђуричић; also transliterated Djuričić) is a Serbian family name that may refer to:

== Notable people ==
- Aleksandar Đuričić (born 1982), Serbian writer
- Anđelko Đuričić (born 1980), Serbian football goalkeeper
- Bogdan Đuričić (1950–2008), Serbian scientist
- Dragoljub Đuričić (born 1953), Montenegrin musician
- Filip Đuričić (born 1992), Serbian football midfielder
- Milan Đuričić (born 1945), Croatian football manager
- Milan Đuričić (1961–2022), Serbian football manager
- Miloš Ðuričić(born 1983), Serbian actor
- Jasna Đuričić (born 1966), Serbian actress
- Saša Đuričić (born 1979), Bosnian Croat football defender

== Geography ==
- Đuričić, Croatia, an uninhabited settlement in Croatia
