= Tomanović =

Tomanović is a Serbian surname that may refer to:

- Goran Tomanović, member of Oktobar 1864
- Ljuba Tomanović, member of Crni ples
- Zdenko Tomanović, lawyer of Slobodan Milošević
- Lazar Tomanović, Prime Minister of Montenegro
- Saša Tomanović, Serbian footballer
