= Mijatovići =

- Village
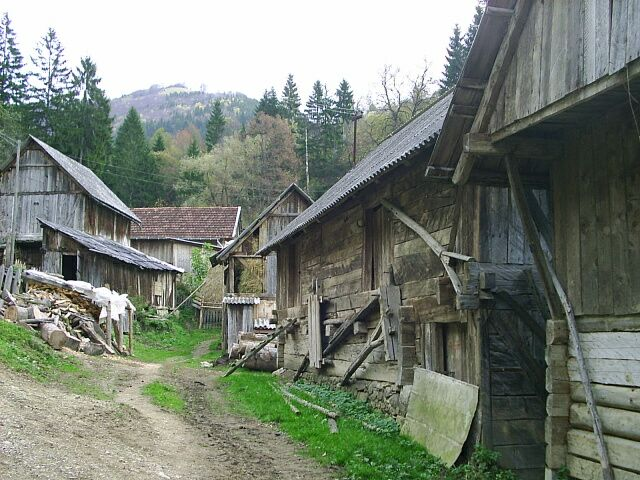

- Location within Bosnia and Herzegovina
- Coordinates: 44.3891687°N 17.4149522°E
- Country: Bosnia and Herzegovina
- Entity: Federation of Bosnia and Herzegovina
- Canton: Central Bosnia
- Municipality: Dobretići

Area
  - Total: 0.69 sq mi (1.78 km^{2})

Population (2013)
  - Total: 31
  - Density: 45/sq mi (17/km^{2})
- Time zone: UTC+1 (CET)
  - Summer (DST): UTC+2 (CEST)

Mijatovići (Serbian Cyrillic: Мијатовићи) is a village in the municipality of Dobretići, Central Bosnia Canton, Bosnia and Herzegovina.

== Demographics ==
According to the 2013 census, its population was 31, all Croats.
