= Milovan Krivokapić =

Serbian politician

Milovan Krivokapić (Serbian Cyrillic: Милован Кривокапић; born 1949) is a politician in Serbia. He has served in the National Assembly of Serbia since 2016 as a member of the Serbian Progressive Party.

== Private career ==
Krivokapić is a medical doctor. He is the director of the Public Health Institute in North Mitrovica in the disputed territory recognized in Serbia as Kosovo and Metohija.

== Parliamentarian ==
Krivokapić received the eighty-third position on the Progressive Party's Aleksandar Vučić – Serbia Is Winning electoral list for the 2016 election and was elected when the list won a majority victory with 131 out of 250 mandates. He serves on the parliamentary health and family committee and the committee on Kosovo-Metohija, and is a member of the parliamentary friendship groups for Belarus, China, Greece, Kazakhstan, Russia, Slovakia, and Spain.

He defended the appointment of Danica Marinković to Serbia's Anti-Corruption Agency in December 2016, after she was accused by opposition members of minimizing the suffering of Albanians in the events known as the Račak massacre. Krivokapić described Marinković as "an honest woman with an impressive biography."

== Politics of Kosovo ==
Krivokapić was elected to the presidency of the Serb List in Kosovo in July 2017 and is currently seeking election to North Mitrovica's municipal assembly in the 2017 Kosovan local elections.
