= Otašević =

Otašević (Serbian Cyrillic: Оташевић) is a Serbian surname. It may refer to:

- Nikola Otašević (born 1982), Serbian basketball player
- Vladimir Otašević (born 1986), footballer
- Momčilo Otašević (born 1990), Montenegrin actor
- Dušan Otašević (born 1940), Serbian artist
- Đorđe Otašević, Yugoslav basketball player
- Ljubica Otašević (1933–1998), Serbian actress and basketball player
- Lilly Otasevic (born 1969), Canadian sculptor
