= Aleksandar Đuričić =

Serbian writer

- Occupations: playwright and novelist
- Writing career
- Genre: Fiction

Aleksandar Đuričić (Cyrillic: Александар Ђуричић; Anglicised: Aleksandar Djuricic; also known as: Ash) is a Serbian novelist and a playwright. Author of two novels Surf na crvenom talasu and Rekvijem za Adama, and collection of plays Nove Drame.

== Biography ==
Aleksandar Đuričić wrote his first play Ljubim vam dušu inspired by the life of actors and directors. After that, he wrote Civilizacija, a play about cataclysm and human nature.

He became a member of the Nova Drama group of young Serbian playwrights, also well esteemed member of Glembay Theatre. The publishing of Djuričić's first novel Surf na crvenom talasu in 2007 made him one of the youngest Serbian novelist ever published at that time.

In 2010 he graduated from the University of Belgrade Faculty of Electrical Engineering. Same year his play "Marlon Monroe" was awarded as the best unpublished play on Slobodan Stojanović contest and printed.

== Novels ==
- Surf na crvenom talasu, 2007
- Rekvijem za Adama, 2015

== Plays ==
- Ljubim vam dušu, 2003
- Civilizacija, 2004
- Marlon Monroe, 2009
- Novi Vođa, 2023

== Screenplays ==
- Letnje večeri, 2004
- Vonj, 2006
- Triznakinje, 2007

== Short stories ==
- Karmina i mesečeva reka, 2010 (Published in "Gradske priče" collection of short stories)
- Neprimetno, 2011 (Published in "Najkrace price 2011" collection of short stories)
- Leopoldov grad, 2012 (Published in "Crte i reze 4" collection)
- O toplim večerima, Kradeno vreme na poklon, 2012 (Published in "Jedan zivot u manje od devetsto znakova", collection of short stories)
- Viden (published in "Beležnica 24/25", 2012)
- Unutrašnji grad (“Silver Albatross” award, Bijela 2012, Montenegro)
- Slučaj udaje Srbijanke Jugović (Published in "Nušić po drugi put među Srbima", Ivanjica 2013)
- Želeti biti negde drugde ("Očitovanja", Dubrovnik 2013)
- Hicing (“Međaj”, Užice 2013)
