= Jovovich =

Jovovich (Serbian: Јововић or Jovović) is a Serbian surname. Notable people with the surname include:

- Galina Jovovich (born 1950), Russian-American actress
- Milla Jovovich (born 1975), American actress and model
  - Jovovich–Hawk, a former clothing line co-created by Milla Jovovich
