= Boris Krivokapić =

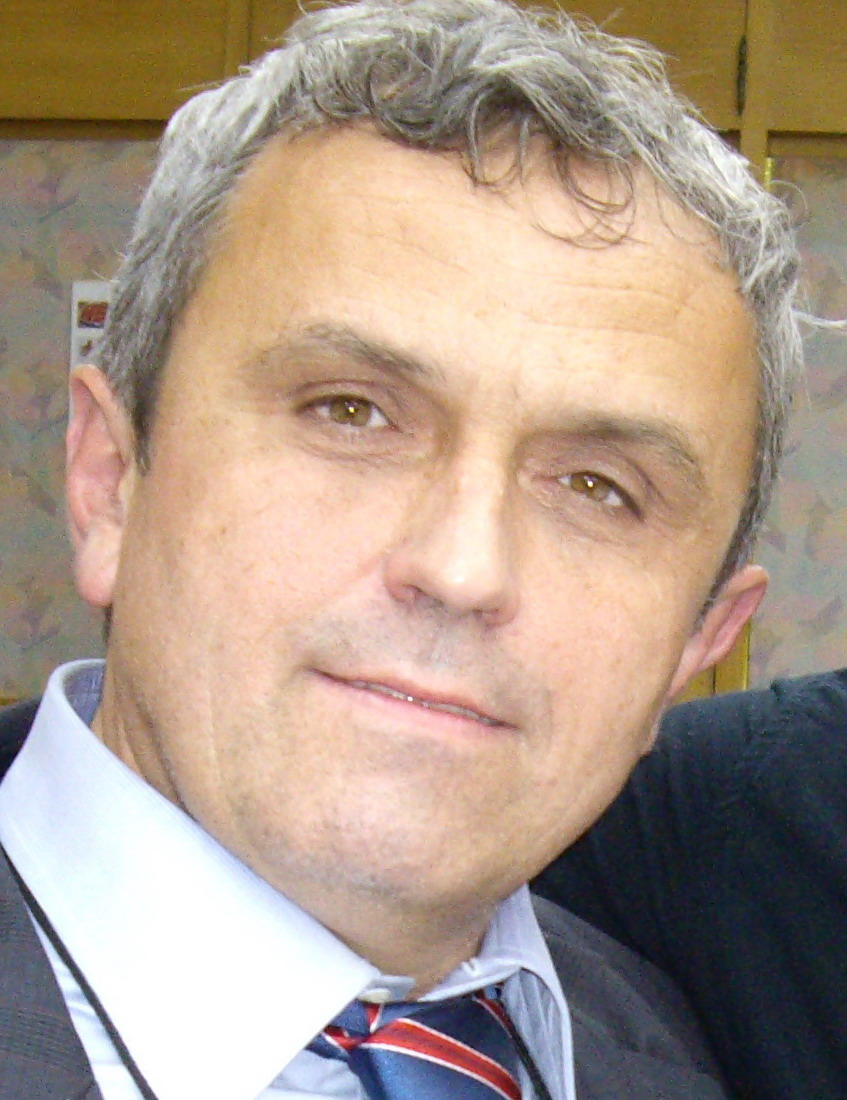
Boris Krivokapić

Boris Krivokapić (born November 16, 1958, in Belgrade, Serbia) is a full professor of Public International Law as well as of Human Rights. He is professor at Law School of the Samara National Research University "S. P. Korolev" (Samara, Russia).

He is a foreign member of the Russian Academy of Natural Sciences (RAEN).

In the past, he worked for 21 years with the Institute of Comparative Law (Belgrade) and was a professor at Law Schools of seven national and private universities in Serbia, Bosnia & Herzegovina, and Russia. He also taught for 9 years at the Diplomatic Academy of the Foreign Ministry of the Republic of Serbia (Belgrade). He held lectures, participated in scientific conferences, symposiums, etc. in Austria, Bosnia & Herzegovina, Croatia, France, Greece, Hungary, Russia, Serbia, South Korea, Soviet Union, Spain, Tanzania, United Kingdom, Yugoslavia.

Between 2012 and 2014, he served as Vice-Rector for Science at Megatrend University. He was editor of four books and Editor-in-Chief of leading national scholarly journals Strani pravni zivot (1994–1998 and 2001–2007) and Megatrend Review (2012–2014). He has been cited over 3600 times in 37 countries of Europe, North and Latin Americas, and Asia. His nine books are official textbooks at Law Faculties of nine national and private universities in four countries - Bosnia & Herzegovina, Montenegro, Russia, and Serbia.

== Education ==
Krivokapić graduated from the Faculty of Law at Belgrade University (1979), where he also earned his M.B.A. (1985) and LL.D. (1988).

== Publications ==
He is the author of 49 books (of them, 27 as a single author) and nearly 250 other scientific works, published in 24 countries in Europe, America, and Asia.

Among books, he is the single author, most important are (English translations of titles are given in parentheses):

- Leksikon međunarodnog prava (“Lexicon Of International Law”), Belgrade 1998, 566 Pp.;
- Zaštita manjina: istorijski razvoj, osnovna pitanja i zaštita u okviru UN ("Protection of Minorities: Historical Development, Main Issues and Protection Within the Framework of the United Nations"), Belgrade 2004, 871 Pp.;
- Zaštita manjina u regionalnim okvirima i putem bilateralnih sporazuma ("Protection of Minorities Within the Regional Frameworks and Through Bilateral International Agreements"), Belgrade 2004, 889 Pp.;
- Zaštita manjina u nacionalnim porecima država ("Protection of Minorities In National Orders of States"), Belgrade 2004, 921 Pp.;
- Enciklopedijski rečnik medjunarodnog prava i medjunarodnih odnosa ("Encyclopedic Dictionary of International Law and International Relations"), Belgrade 2010, 1190 Pp.;
- Aktuelni problemi međunarodnog prava ("Current Problems of International Law"), Belgrade 2011, 754 Pp.;
- Medjunarodno javno pravo ("Public International Law"), 3rd ed., Belgrade 2017, 927 Pp.;
- Mir i rat u medjunarodnim odnosima i pravu ("Peace and War in International Relations and Law"), Belgrade 2017, 1074 Pp.
- Мирное разрешение международных споров ("Peaceful Settlement of International Disputes"), Самара (Samara National University, Samara, Russia) 2020, 591 Pp.
- Международное право в период вооруженных конфликтов ("International Law in Armed Conflicts"), Самара (Samara National University, Samara, Russia) 2021, 834 Pp.
- Проблемы международного права ("Problems of International Law"), Самара (Samara National University, Samara, Russia) 2022, 572 Pp.
- Rat i pravo: Teorija i praksa oružanih sukoba i međunarodno pravo ("War and Law: Theory and Practice of International Armed Conflicts and International Law"), Banja Luka (Academy of Sciences and Arts of the Republic of Srpska et al., Banja Luka, Bosnia & Herzegovina) 2023, 1552 Pp.
- Геноцид између права и политике ("Genocide between Law and Politics"), Banja Luka (Bosnia & Herzegovina) & Belgrade (Serbia), 2026, 556 Pp.

Other books he is the sole author of:

- Konzularne konvencije SSSR-a sa drugim zemljama Varsavskog ugovora (“Consular Conventions of the USSR With Orher Countries of Warsaw Pact”), Belgrade 1987, 131 Pp.;
- Kontrola drzavne uprave u Sovjetskom Savezu - dometi “perestrojke” (“Control Over State Administration in the Soviet Union”), Belgrade 1988, 224 Pp.;
- NATO agresija na Jugoslaviju - sila iznad prava” (“NATO Aggression on Yugoslavia - the Power Above the Law”), Belgrade 1999, 162 Pp.;
- Položaj etničkih manjina u obrazovanju - uporedna analiza (“Status Of Ethnic Minorities In Education - A Comparative Analysis”), Belgrade 2000, 254 Pp.;
- Evropska socijalna povelja (“European Social Charter”), Belgrade 2002, 120 Pp.;
- Službena upotreba jezika u međunarodnom pravu i novijem zakonodavstvu nekih evropskih država ("Official Use Of Language In International Law And Recent Legislature Of Some European States"), Belgrade 2004, 405 Pp.;
- Manjine u međunarodnom pravu ("Minorities In International Law"), Belgrade 2006, 278 Pp.;
- Međunarodno pravo: koreni, razvoj, perspektive ("International Law: Roots, Development, Perspectives"), Belgrade 2006, 279 Pp.;
- Medjunarodno javno pravo ("Public International Law"), Belgrade 2013, 535 Pp.;
- Medjunarodno javno pravo ("Public International Law"), 2nd ed., Belgrade 2014, 757 Pp.;
- Osnovi međunarodnog prava (“Basics of International Law”), Belgrade 2016, 325 Pp.;
- Uvod u medjunarodno pravo (“Introduction to International Law”), Belgrade 2017, 464 Pp.
- Проблемы современного международного права (in Russian: "Problems of Contemporary International Law"), Samara, Russia, 2017, 328 Pp.;
- Международное публичное право (in Russian: "Public International Law"), Samara, Russia, 2018, 598 Pp.;
- Uvod u medjunarodno pravo (“Introduction to International Law”), 2nd ed. Belgrade 2018, 399 Pp.

Among the books, he is one of the co-authors, more important than others are:

- Pravo i pravo na upotrebu jezika (“Law and the Right to use Language”), Belgrade 1990;
- Jugoslovenske manjine u susednim zemljama i njihova prava” (“Yugoslav Minorities in Neighboring Countries and their Rights”), Belgrade 1992;
- Alandska ostrva - primer uspesne autonomije (“Aland Islands - an Example of Successful Autonomy”), Belgrade 2001;
- International Law and the Interventionism in the "New World Order", Madrid, 2000;
- Uvod u pravo Finske (“Introduction to Finnish Legal System”), Belgrade 2005;
- Enciklopedija srpskog naroda ("Encyclopedia of the Serbian People"), Belgrade 2008;
- La toponomastica in Istria, Fiume e Dalmazia (in Italian: "Toponomastics in Istria, Fiume and Dalmatia"), Volume I, Profili giuridici, Venezia, 2009;
- Srpsko pravo i međunarodne sudske institucije ("Serbian Law and International Judicial Institutions"), Belgrade 2009;
- Medjunarodna ljudska prava (“International Human Rights”), Belgrade, 11 editions in 2010-2023;
- Topographical Names and Protection of Linguistic Minorities, Peter Lang International Academic Publishers, Frankfurt am Main, Berlin, Bern, Bruxelles, New York, Oxford, Wien, 2011;
- The Hague Tribunal Between Law and Politics, Belgrade, 2013;,
- Европейское измерение 2016 (in Russian: "European Dimension 2016"), Москва (Moscow) 2016;
- Uvod u pravo Rusije ("Introduction to the Law of Russia"), Belgrade 2017;
- Upotreba sile u međunarodnim odnosima ("Use of Force in International Relations"), Belgrade 2018; etc.

List of publications on Magtrend University website.

== Awards ==
- (1996) Acknowledgement from the Institute of Comparative Law (Belgrade);
- (2005) Award class A1 for distinguished results in science. Awarded by Serbian Ministry of Science;
- (2006) Award “Prof. dr Borislav T. Blagojevic” for the best book on Comparative and European Law, published in Serbia & Montenegro in the period 2004–2005;
- (2011) Award “Best Author” for 2011, by "Sluzbeni glasnik", Belgrade (the biggest publisher of legal literature in the Balkans);
- (2023) Acknowledgment from the Rector of Samara National University “S. P. Korolev”, Samara, Russia;
- (2023) Acknowledgment from the Association of Lawyers of Russia (Samara Regional Department), Samara, Russia

== Martial Arts ==
He is also proficient in Korean and other Martial Arts. In Martial Arts since 1974, Grandmaster, Founder (in 1994) of Hapkikwan and President of Hapkikwan International, Vice-President of European Hapkido Union, Director of the Serbian branch of the Korea Hapkido Federation.
