= Shkozet railway station =

Railway station in Durrës, Albania

Shkozet railway station Stacioni Hekurudhor Shkozet
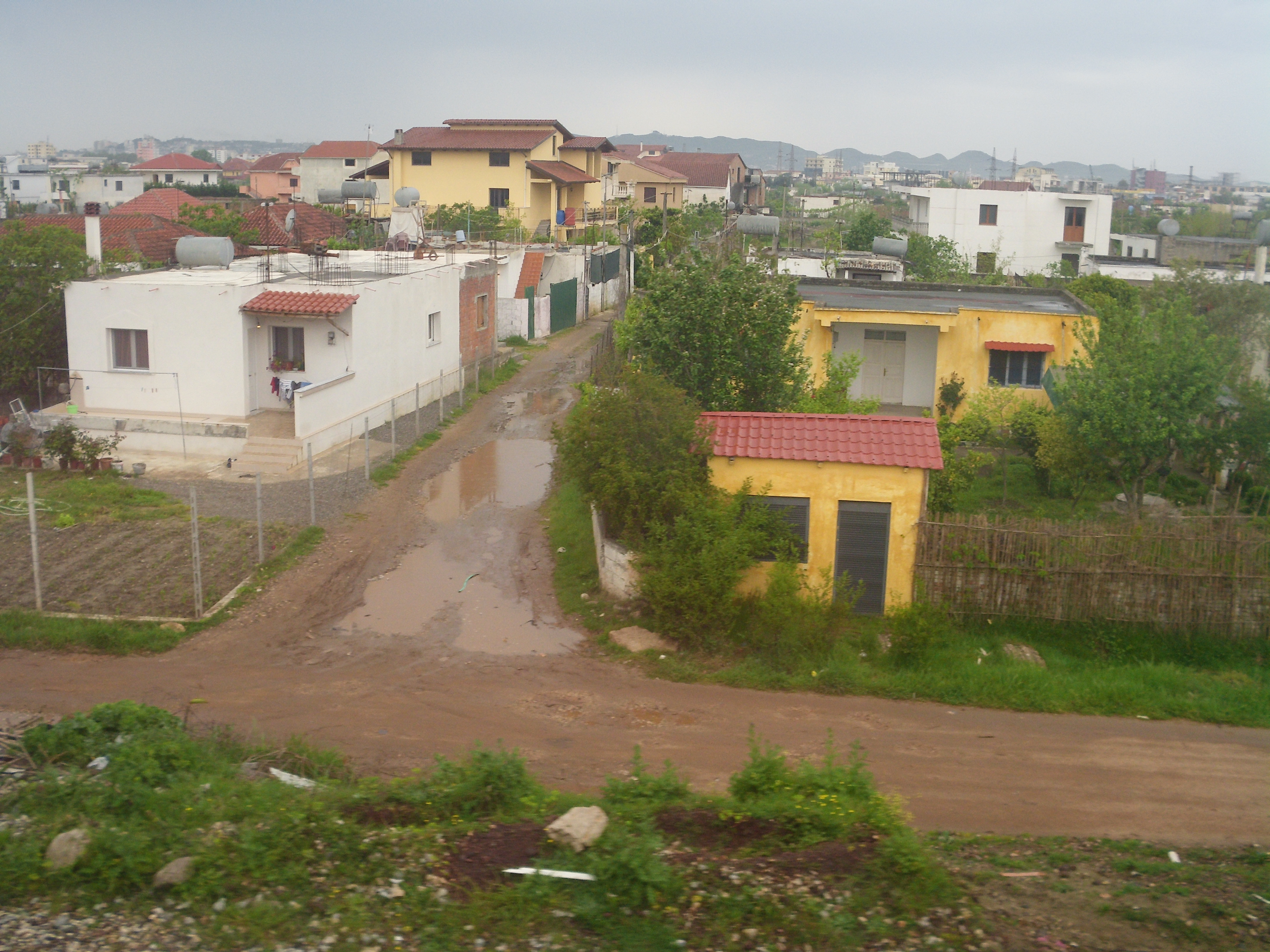
- View from a carriage at Shkozet, 2014

General information
- Location: Durrës; Durrës County; Albania
- Coordinates: 41.3163°N 19.4770°E
- System: Hekurudha Shqiptare
- Lines: Durrës-Tiranë railway, Durrës-Vlorë railway
- Platforms: ?

History
- Opened: 23 February 1949
Location
- Location within Albania

Shkozet railway station (Albanian: Stacioni Hekurudhor Shkozet) is a railway station serving the eastern part of the city of Durrës, Albania, located about 2 kilometres (1.2 mi) east of Durrës railway station.

The line between Shkozet and Tirana was built as a narrow-gauge military railway during the Second World War. Afterwards, it was upgraded to standard gauge and became part of the passenger railway network, the station reopening in 1949. The station is little more than a halt, and is not always advertised, though the majority of trains were calling there in 2011.

Shkozet is the location of the main railway depot for Hekurudha Shqiptare, as well as accommodation for freight trains. Steam locomotives were withdrawn in Albania in 1991, though a small number remained at Shkozet depot in 2011 (some earmarked for preservation), with several others having been scrapped in the early 2000s. In 2016, the European Bank for Reconstruction and Development proposed a loan of €36.87 million to upgrade the railway services between Durrës and Tirana. This would include Shkozet station, though the HSH facilities there were omitted from the plans.

== See also ==
- List of railway stations in Albania
- Rail transport in Albania
- History of rail transport in Albania
- Transport in Albania
- Durrës–Tiranë railway
- Durrës–Vlorë railway
