= Fier railway station =

Railway station in Fier, Albania

Fier railway station Stacioni hekurudhor i Fierit
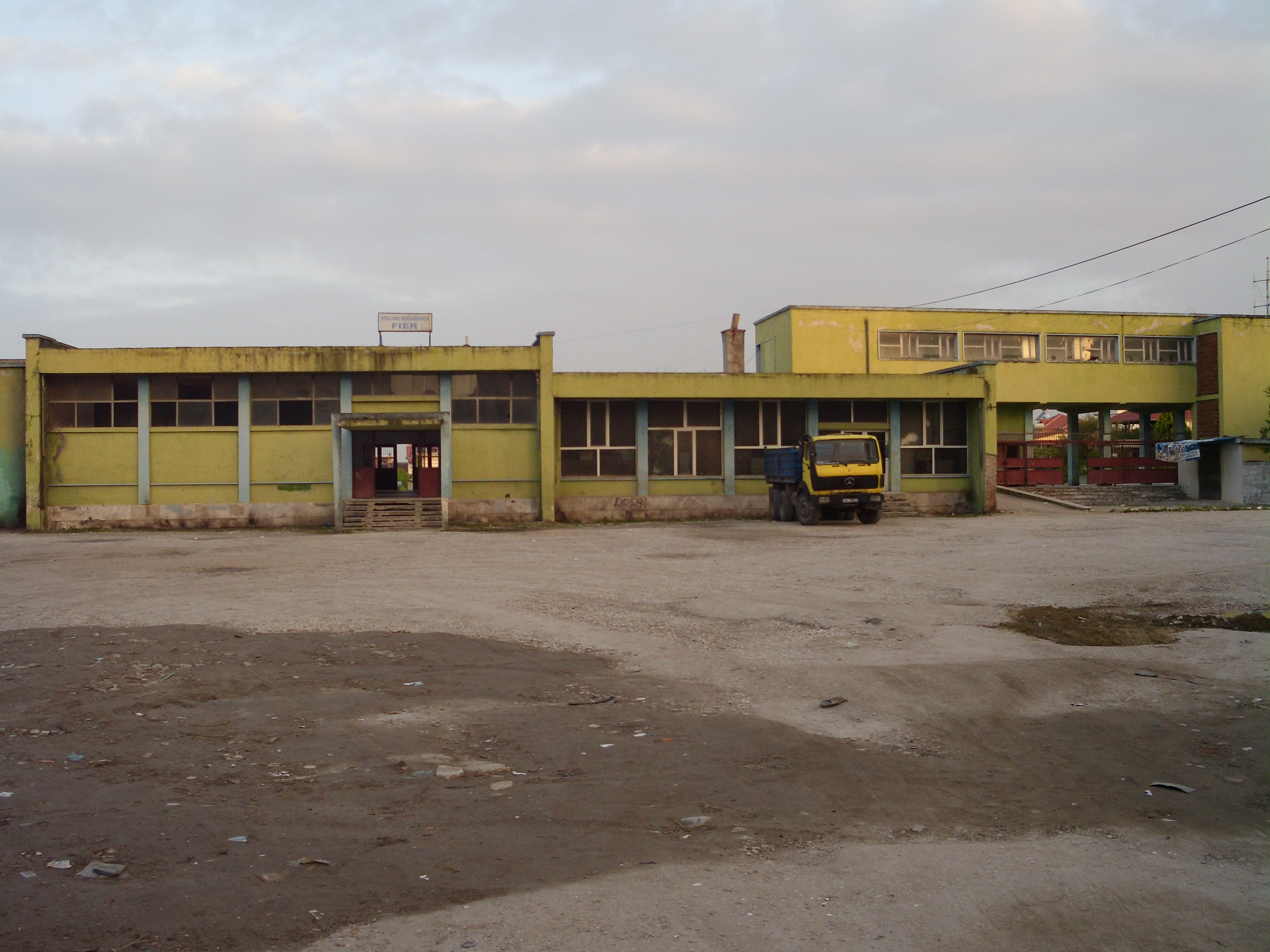
- The station in 2014

General information
- Location: Fier; Fier County; Albania
- Coordinates: 40.7299°N 19.5535°E
- System: Hekurudha Shqiptare
- Operator: Hekurudha Shqiptare
- Line: Durrës-Vlorë railway
- Platforms: 2

History
- Opened: 13 October 1968
Location
- Location within Albania Location within Europe

Fier railway station (Albanian: Stacioni hekurudhor i Fier) is a railway station that serves the city of Fier in Fier County in Southern Albania.

== History ==
The station opened on 13 October 1968 after the railway line from Rrogozhinë (on the Durrës-Elbasan railway) to Fier was completed. The station was the southern terminus of the line until it was extended southwards to Ballsh in 1975, though passenger services south of Fier did not commence until the line was extended further southwards to Vlorë in 1985.

Like Laç, Fier was a busy transportation hub in the days of the People's Socialist Republic of Albania for ores and fertiliser freight at a time when road infrastructure was still underdeveloped. In 1991, the International Fertilizer Development Center reported that 80-90% of fertiliser produced in Fier and Laç was transported by rail. Although the journey estimates were optimistic, the transportation methods were not suitable and were in need of revision.

== Gallery ==
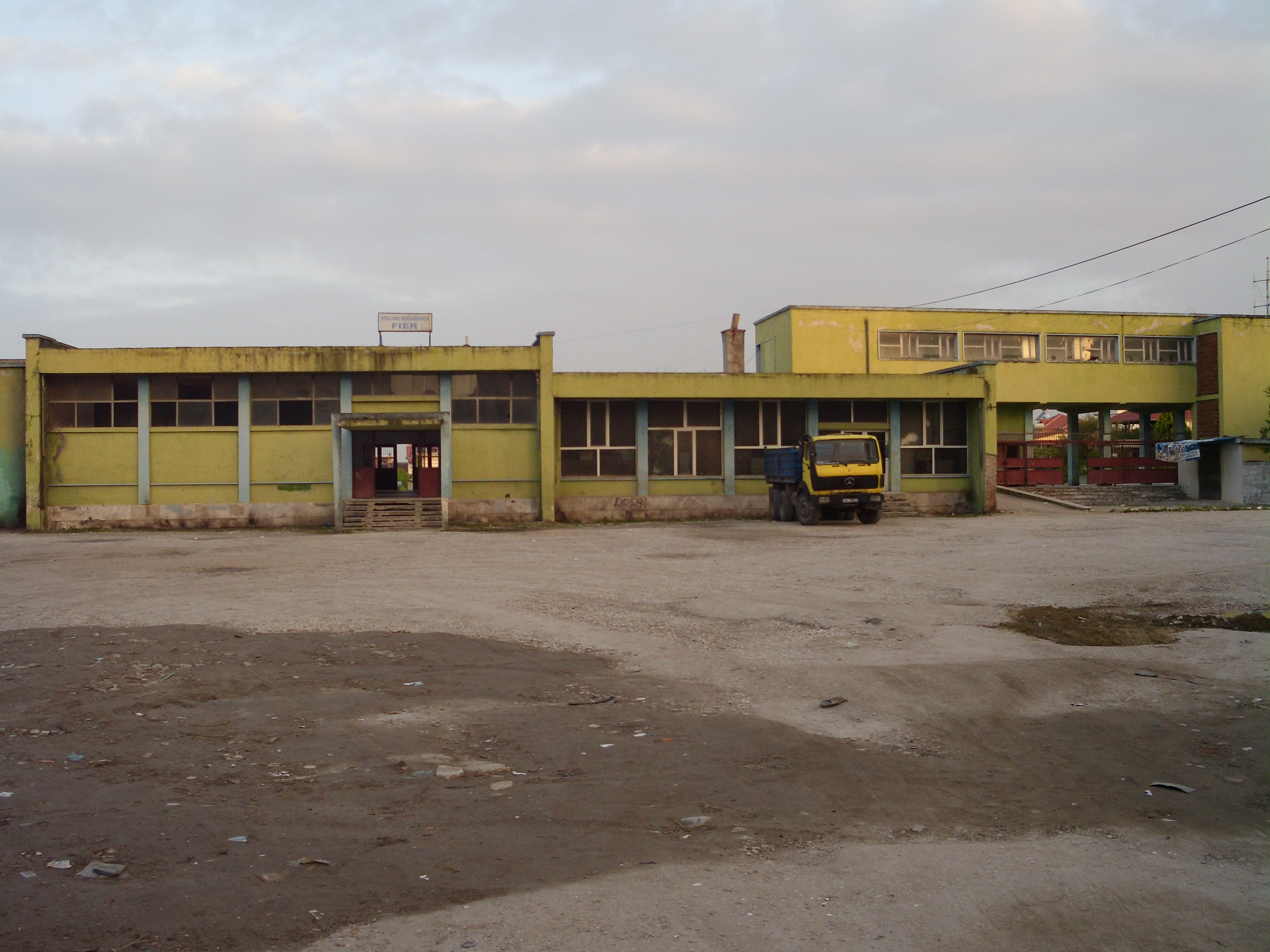
Street facade of the station building in 2014.

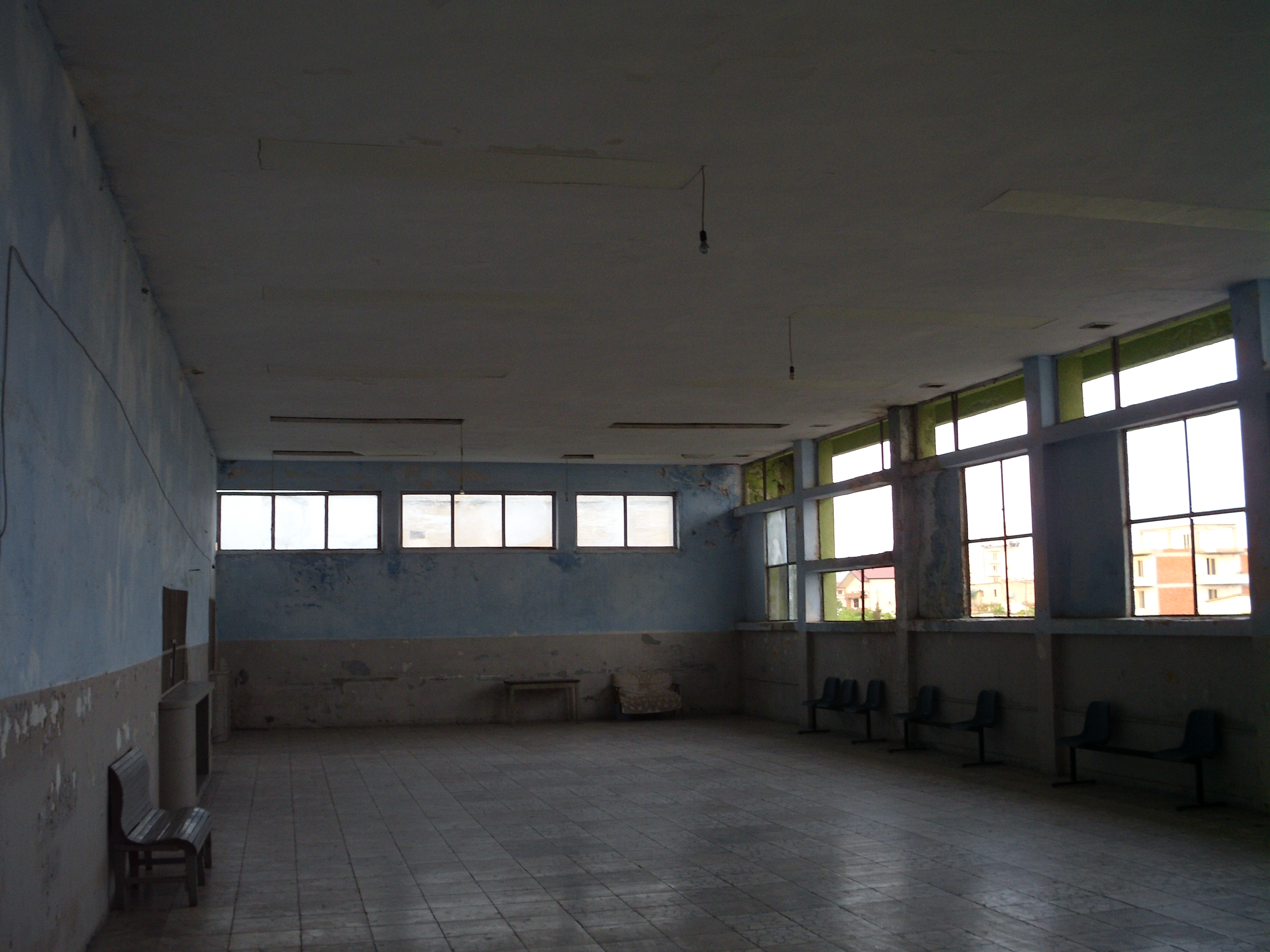
The waiting room at Fier station in 2014.

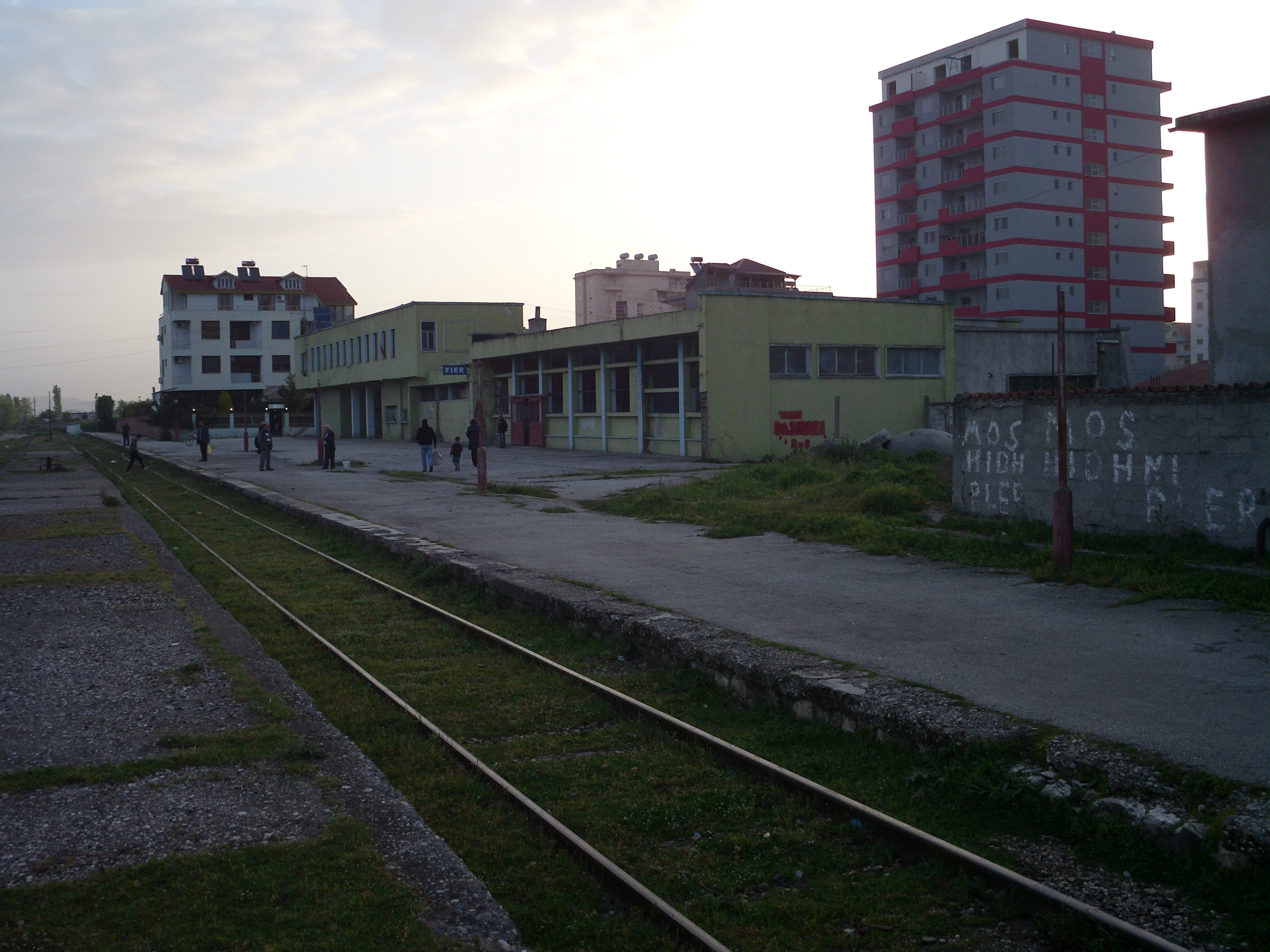
The station platforms in 2014.

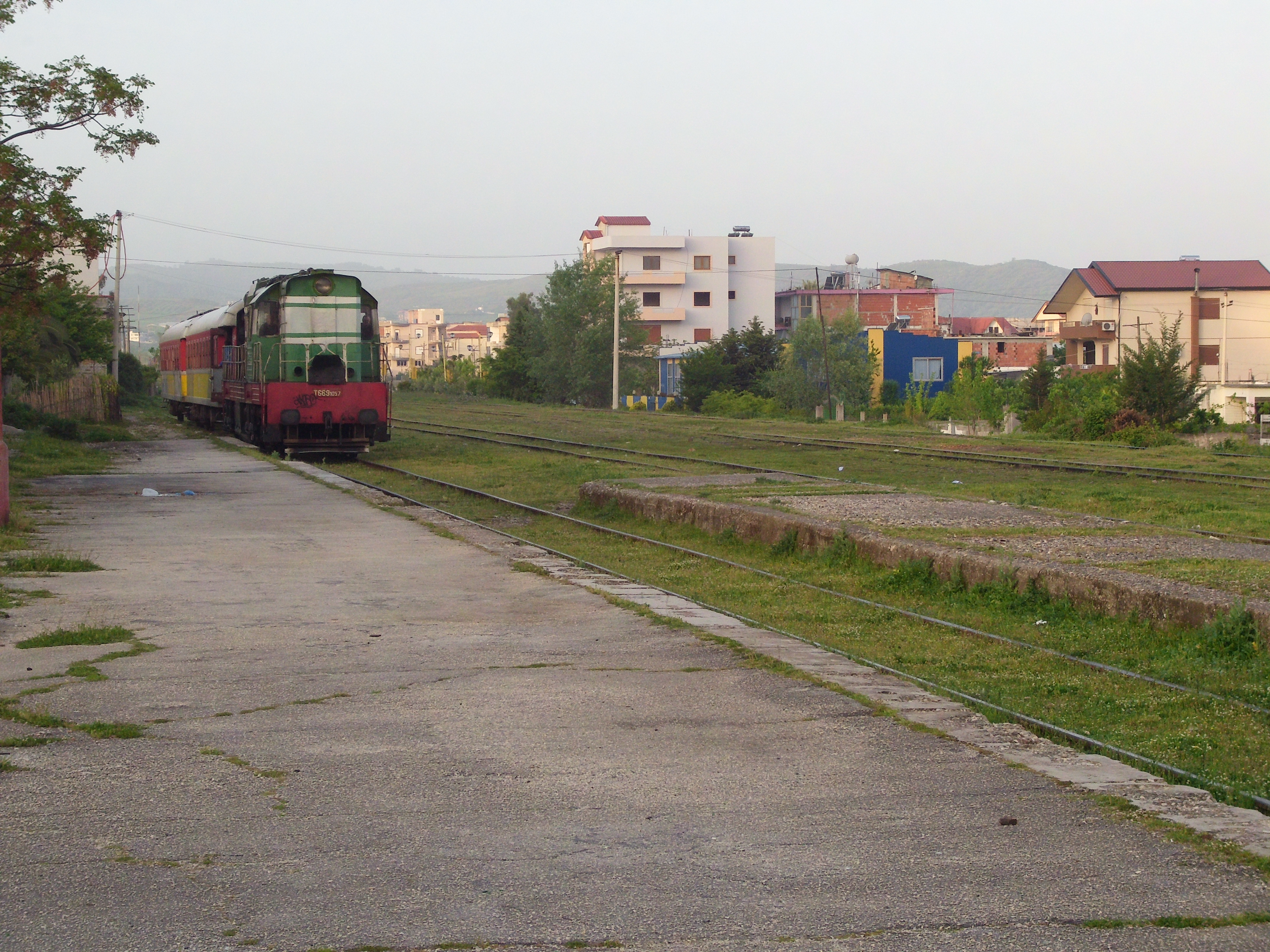
Train approaching the station in 2014.

== See also ==
- List of railway stations in Albania
- Rail transport in Albania
- History of rail transport in Albania
- Transport in Albania
