= Durrës–Tirana railway =

Railway line in Albania

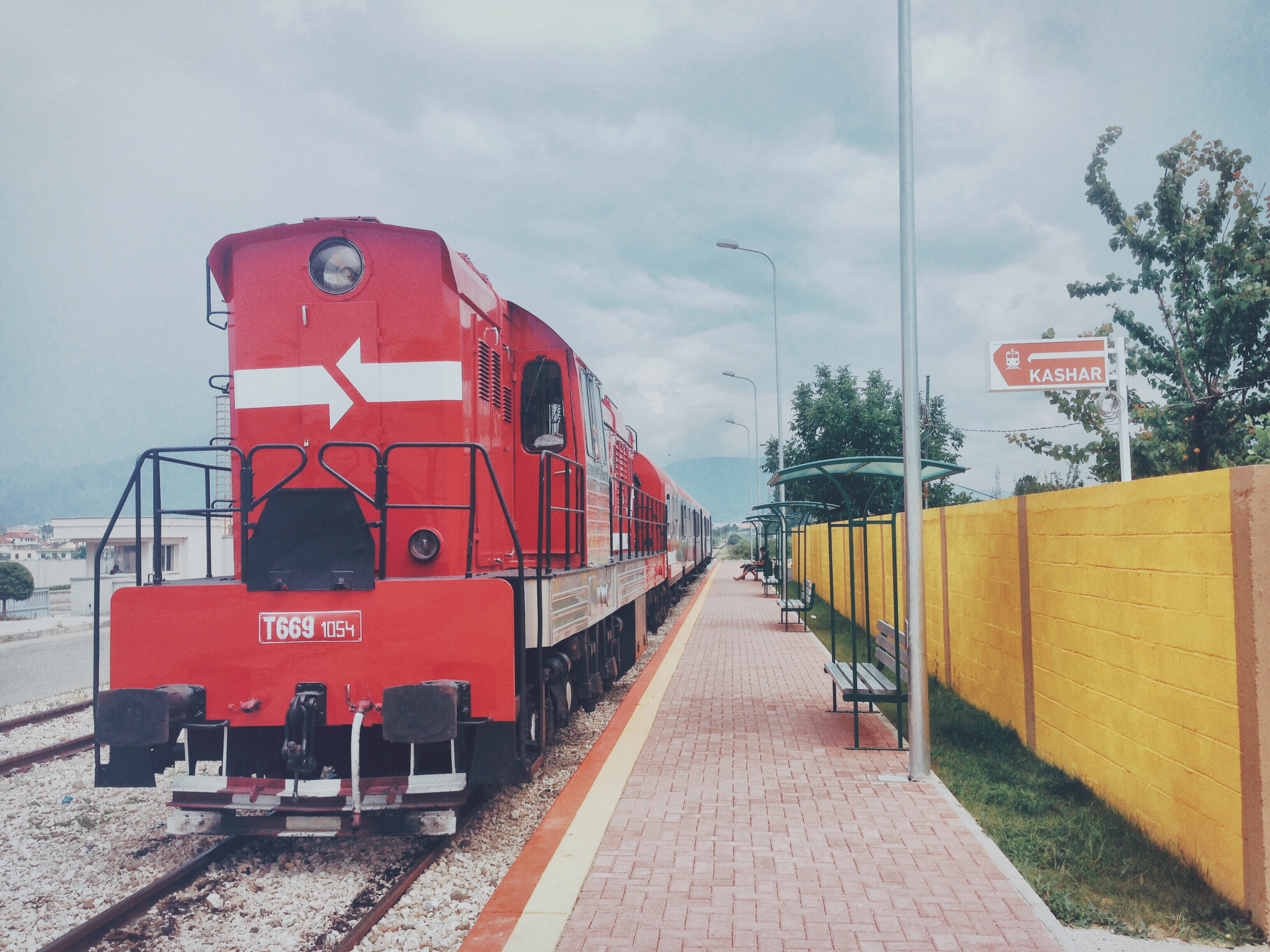
- Train in Kashar station serving Tirana, May 2015

Overview
- Status: Under reconstruction
- Owner: Hekurudha Shqiptare
- Locale: Albania
- Termini: Durrës; Tirana
- Stations: Existing 8; additional stations planned

Service
- Type: Passenger railway
- Operator: Hekurudha Shqiptare

History
- Opened: 27 January 1949
- Closed: September 2013 (Tirana terminus)
- Reopened: Expected end of 2027

Technical
- Line length: 38 km (23.61 mi)
- Track gauge: 1,435 mm (4 ft 8 1/2 in) standard gauge
- Electrification: Planned
- Operating speed: 120 km/h (75 mph)

The Durrës–Tirana railway is a railway line in Albania connecting the country's two largest cities, Durrës and Tirana. Opened in 1949, it became one of Albania's most important passenger railway routes and formed part of the core network of Hekurudha Shqiptare (Albanian Railways).

Passenger services to central Tirana ceased in 2013 following the demolition of Tirana railway station for the extension of Tirana's main boulevard. Limited services continued to terminate at Kashar until 2018, after which there was no direct railway connection between Durrës and Tirana.

The railway is currently undergoing major reconstruction as part of the Durrës–Tirana Public Transport Terminal (PTT) railway project, which includes rehabilitation of the existing line, construction of a new railway connection to Tirana International Airport, modern signalling and telecommunications systems, and full electrification. The rebuilt railway is expected to begin operations by the end of 2027.

At Vorë, the line connects with the Shkodër–Vorë railway, while at Durrës it historically connected with the Durrës–Vlorë railway and Durrës–Pogradec railway.

== History ==
The railway was built between 1948 and 1949 and was the second passenger railway constructed in Albania after the Durrës–Peqin railway, completed in 1948.

Construction began at Shkozet, near Durrës, on 11 April 1948. The project was carried out largely through voluntary labour organised by the Labour Youth Union of Albania. Around 29,000 young volunteers and 1,400 skilled workers participated in construction. Youth brigades from Bulgaria and Yugoslavia also contributed before relations between Albania and Yugoslavia deteriorated during the Albanian–Yugoslav split.

The railway was completed under the supervision of Soviet engineer Valeri Gaydarov. Rails were imported from the Soviet Union through the port of Durrës. The line was inaugurated on 27 January 1949, timed to coincide with celebrations of the anniversary of the Red Army.

Two major engineering works were required during construction: the 212-metre Rrashbull Tunnel and the 91-metre bridge over the Erzen River. The Erzen bridge was completed on 16 October 1948, coinciding with the birthday of Enver Hoxha.

The line became one of the busiest passenger routes in Albania, linking the country's largest port city with the capital. It also provided connections to other railway routes through Durrës and Vorë.

== 2010 accident ==
On 25 July 2010, a train operating on the Durrës–Tirana railway collided with a police SUV that was positioned on the tracks. The vehicle was pushed along the railway before the train came to a stop. None of the three police officers inside the vehicle were injured.

== Closure of Tirana service ==
In September 2013, the railway connection to central Tirana was interrupted after Tirana railway station was demolished to allow construction of the extension of Tirana's main boulevard.

Following the demolition, passengers travelling to Tirana initially used Vorë railway station, before services were transferred to the renovated Kashar railway station in May 2015.

Kashar services ended in 2018, leaving no active railway connection between Durrës and Tirana. The closure was widely regarded as a consequence of the lack of investment in Albania's railway infrastructure and the need to rebuild the route to modern standards.

== Reconstruction and modernisation ==
=== Durrës–Tirana Public Transport Terminal railway project ===
The reconstruction of the railway is part of Albania's effort to modernise its railway network and integrate it with European transport standards. The project is supported through the Western Balkans Investment Framework and European financial institutions.

The project consists of:

- rehabilitation of approximately 34.17 km of the existing Durrës–Tirana railway section;
- construction of a new railway connection towards Tirana International Airport Nënë Tereza;
- construction of a 5.697 km airport branch line between the airport and the main railway route;
- installation of modern signalling and telecommunications systems;
- improvements to railway crossings, safety systems and accessibility;
- upgrades allowing higher speeds and increased axle loads in accordance with European standards.

The project is intended not only to restore passenger services between Durrës and Tirana but also to create a direct rail connection between Albania's main port, capital and international airport.

=== Funding ===
Funding for the reconstruction was secured in 2018. The financing package included a €35.4 million grant from the European Union through the Western Balkans Investment Framework, a €36.8 million loan from the European Bank for Reconstruction and Development (EBRD), and €16 million from the Albanian government.

In 2021, Hekurudha Shqiptare signed a contract with the Italian company INC for rehabilitation of the railway and construction of the airport connection.

=== Electrification ===
The rebuilt railway is planned to become Albania's first fully electric railway service.

In 2026, the Albanian government submitted an agreement with the EBRD to finance full electrification of the Durrës–Tirana railway and the Rinas airport railway station. The financing will provide railway power infrastructure and allow the system to operate according to European Union standards.

Civil works have been completed, while signalling systems and stations are being finalised. The government expects passenger operations to resume by the end of 2027 with electric trains capable of speeds up to 120 km/h.

=== Strategic importance ===
The railway is part of Albania's wider effort to revive rail transport after decades of decline. Limited investment following the 1990s resulted in ageing infrastructure, reduced passenger services and increased dependence on road transport.

European institutions have identified railway investment as a way to reduce road congestion, improve environmental performance and strengthen Albania's links with European transport networks.

Durrës is an important node on Pan-European Corridor VIII, a transport route linking the Adriatic Sea with the Black Sea through Albania, North Macedonia and Bulgaria. The restored railway connection is expected to improve links between Durrës Port, Tirana, the airport and future railway projects in the Western Balkans.

== Stations ==
Station	Opened	Status
Durrës	1949	Under reconstruction
Shkozet	1949	No regular passenger service
Sukth		Served before reconstruction
Vorë	1949	Closed during reconstruction
Kashar		Closed since 2018
Kamëz		Closed since 2013
Tirana	27 January 1949	Closed since 2013; replacement station planned

== See also ==
- Hekurudha Shqiptare
- Rail transport in Albania
- History of rail transport in Albania
- Transport in Albania
- Shkodër–Vorë railway
