= Vlorë railway station =

Railway station in Vlorë, Albania

Vlorë railway station Stacioni hekurudhor i Vlorës
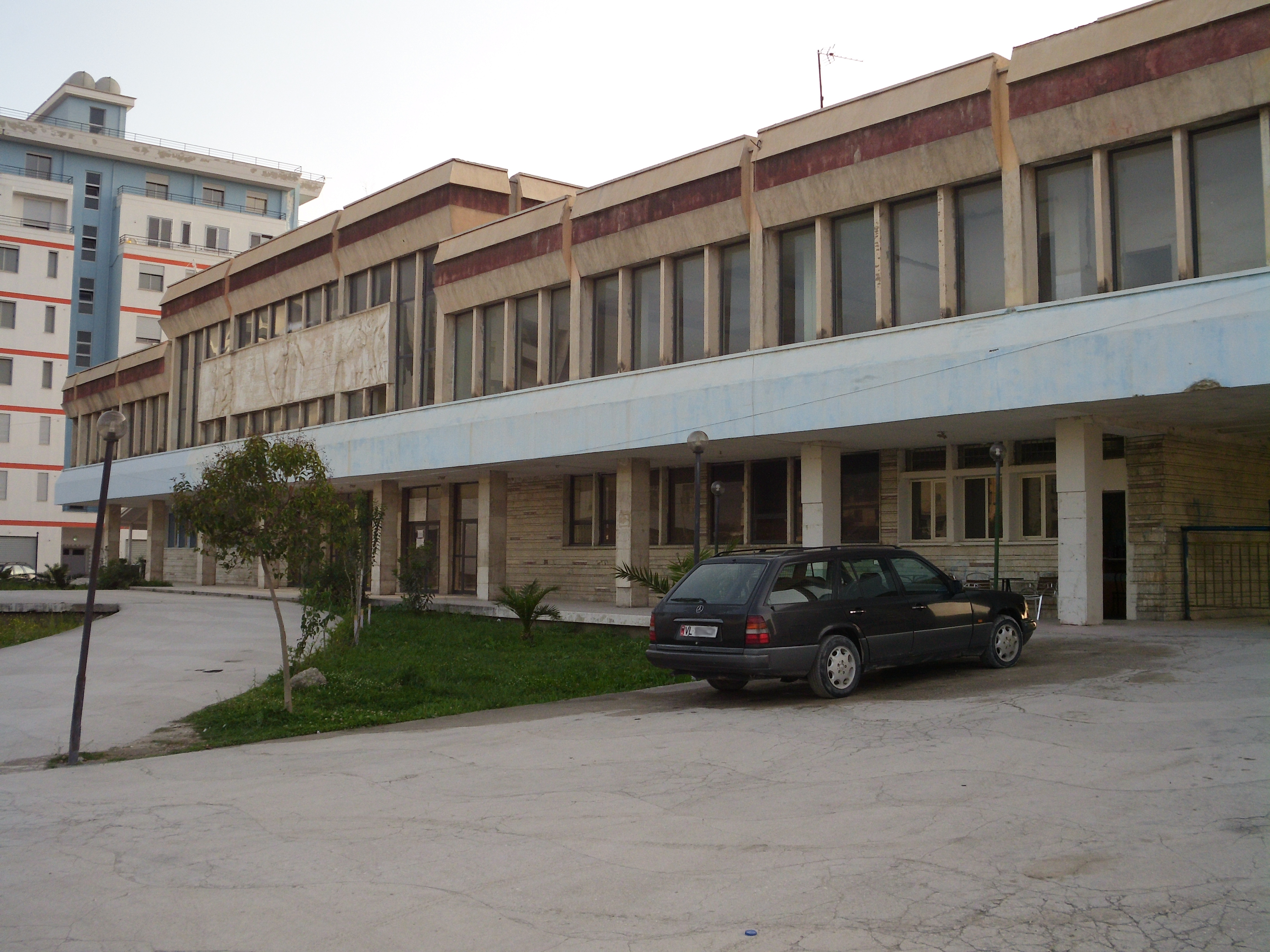
- Street facade of the station building in 2014

General information
- Location: Rruga Gjergj Kastrioti; Vlorë 9400; Albania
- Coordinates: 40.4661°N 19.4822°E
- System: Terminal railway station
- Line: Durrës-Vlorë railway
- Platforms: 2

Construction
- Architect: Arben Meksi

History
- Opened: 14 October 1985
Location
- Location within Albania Location within Europe

Vlorë railway station (Albanian: Stacioni hekurudhor i Vlorës) is a railway station serving the city of Vlorë in southern Albania, the third most populous city of the Republic of Albania.

The station is the southern terminus of the Durrës-Vlorë railway line, and is the southernmost station on the Albanian railway network. It opened in 1985 when the railway line was extended from Nartë to Vlorë.

== History ==
Vlorë station opened on 14 October 1985, when the railway section from Nartë to Vlorë came into service.

== Architecture ==
The station building was designed by a team led by architect Arben Meksi, who was actively involved during construction between 1983 and 1985, collaborating with the project manager, engineer P. Adhami. The result was a compact volume, arranged horizontally, with level differences that highlight the central entrance area. For functional reasons, the architect wanted the route from the square in front of the station to the platforms to be as short and unobstructed as possible, and passengers getting off the train cross through an underground passage that reaches the northern part of the building. On the second floor there is a restaurant with a kitchen and an open bar. The walls are decorated with artwork, mosaics and decorative plaster tiles.

== Services ==
In 2012, there was only one pair of trains running from Vlorë to Tirana and back: the train left Vlorë at 05:00, arrived in Tirana at 10:45, returned at 14:20 and arrived in Vlorë at 20:10.

A limited service was still in operation on the line until 2015, but passenger services no longer run south of Fier. and do not reach Vlorë. In that year, a train set departed from Vlorë at 05:00 and arrived in Kashar at 10:52. The return train left Kashar at 13:15 and arrived in Vlorë at 19.00.

In February 2016, a private rail company, Albrail, received a concession to start transporting crude oil from Fier to Vlorë in December 2018.

== Gallery ==
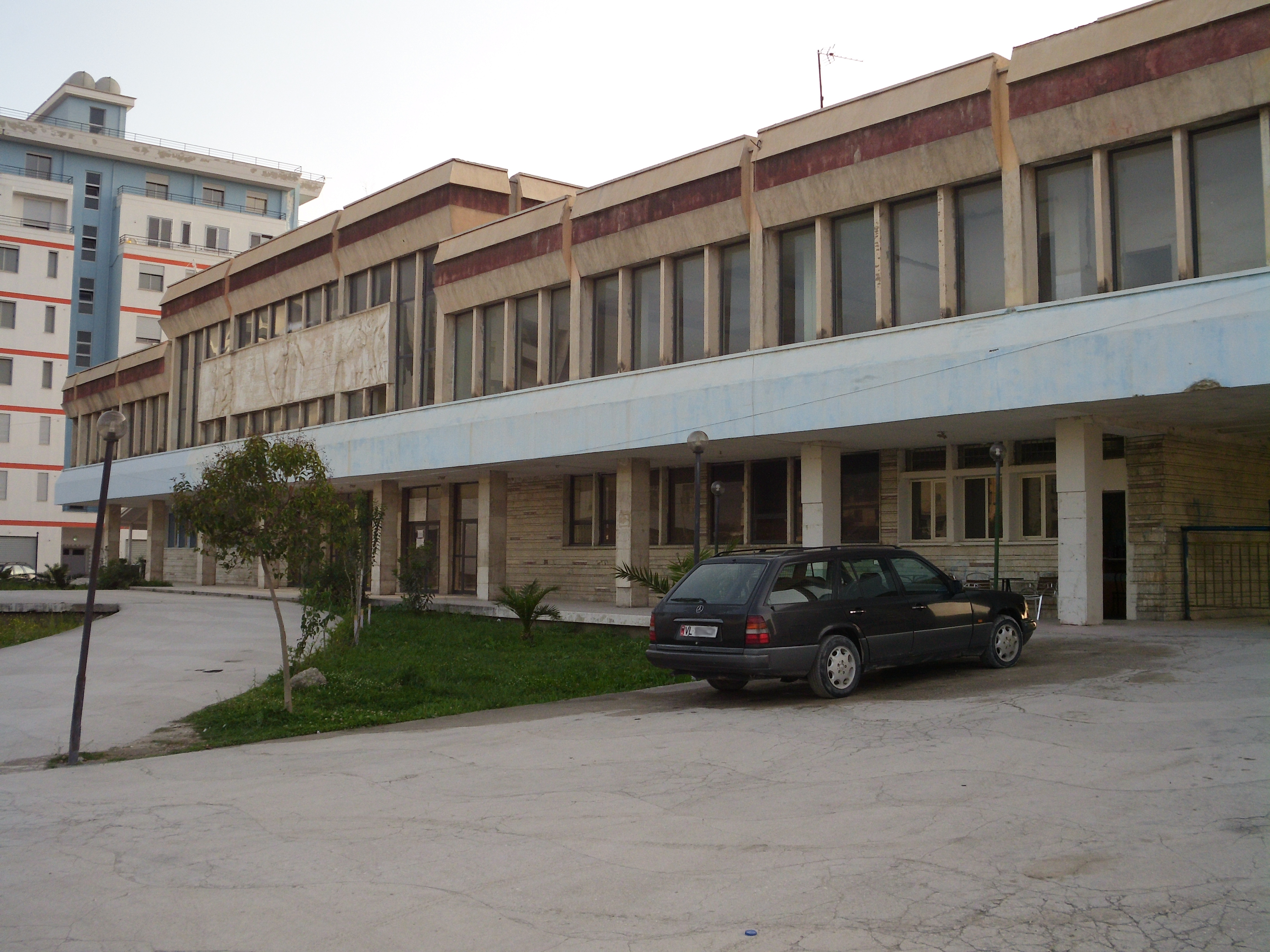
Street facade of the station building in 2014

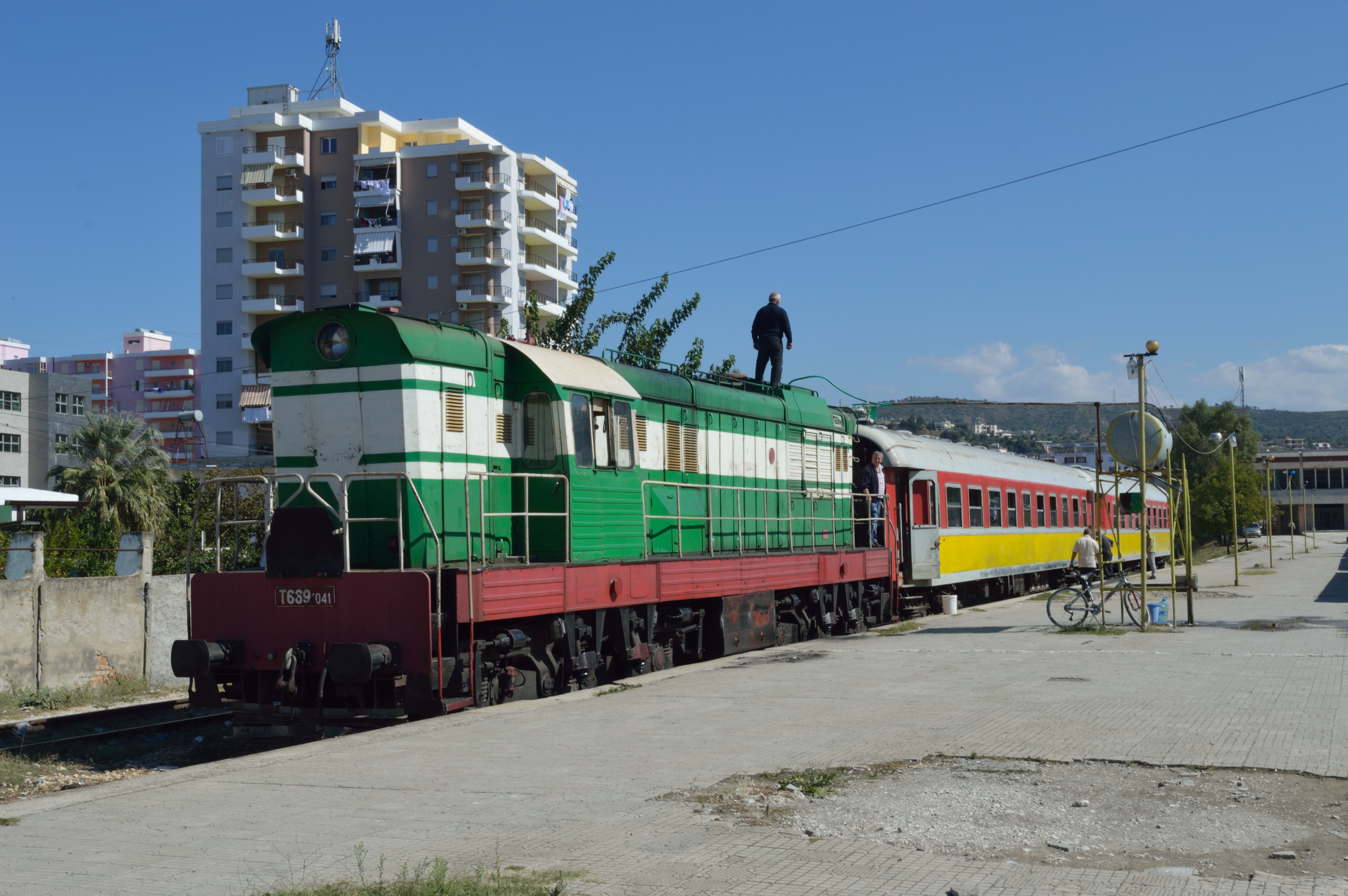
HSH train to Rrogozhinë at Vlorë station in October 2013

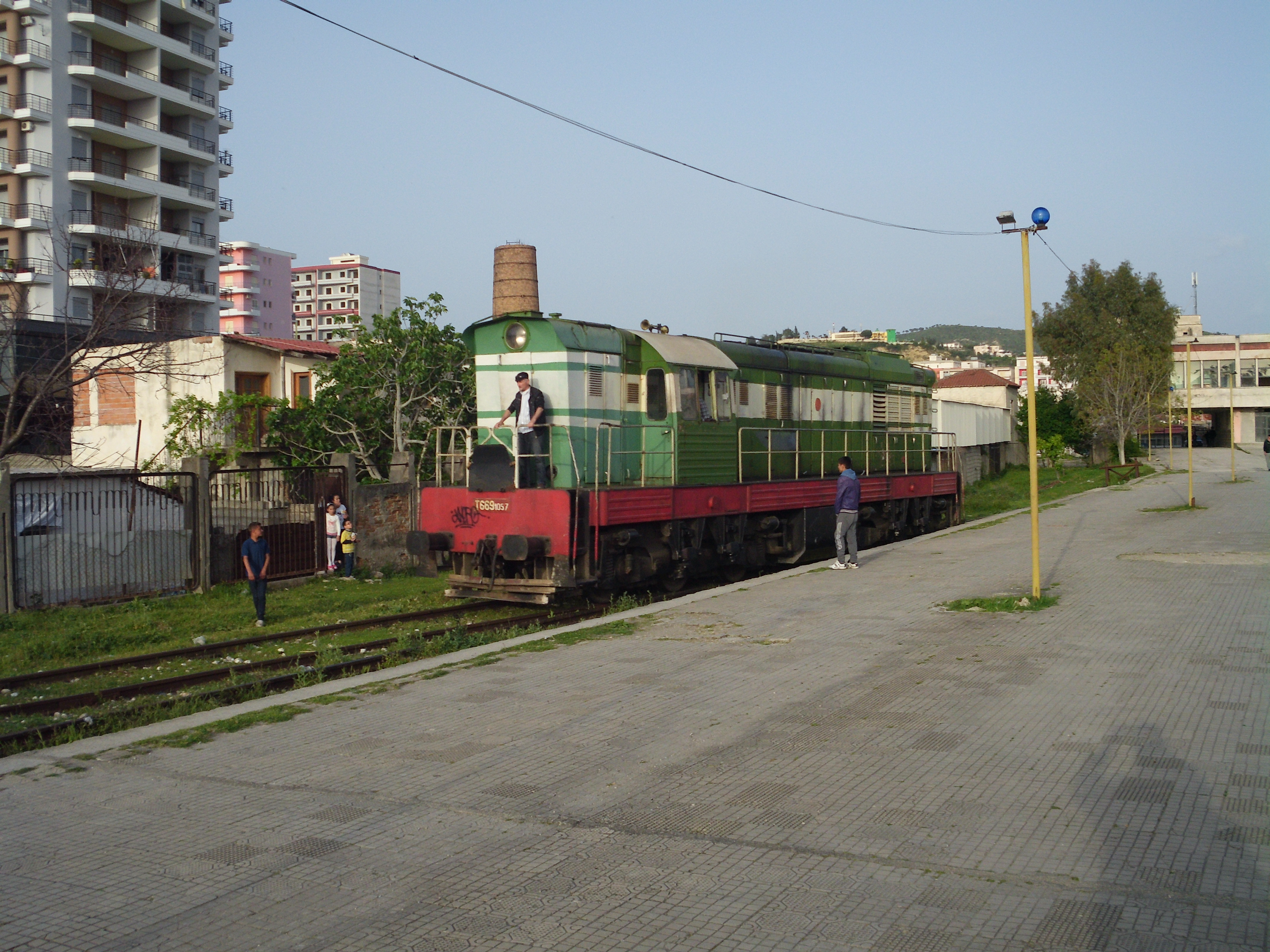
HSH engine at Vlorë station in April 2014

== See also ==
- List of railway stations in Albania
- Rail transport in Albania
- History of rail transport in Albania
- Transport in Albania
