= Tirana railway station =

Former railway station in Tirana, Albania

Tirana railway station Stacioni hekurudhor i Tiranës
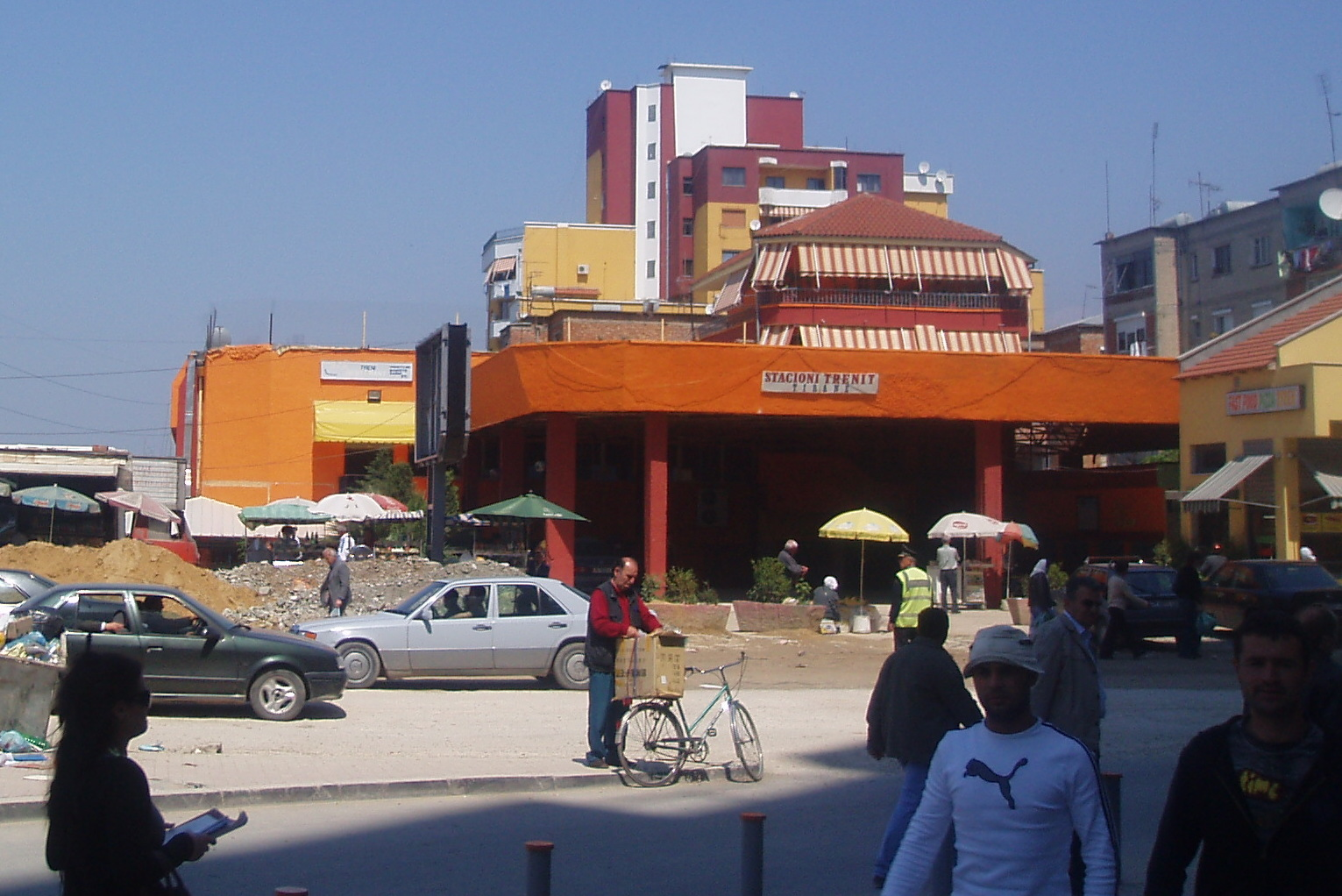
- Tirana railway station before demolition

General information
- Location: Tirana; Albania
- Coordinates: 41.3366°N 19.816°E
- System: Hekurudha Shqiptare
- Line: Durrës–Tiranë railway
- Platforms: 2
- Tracks: 2
- Connections: Bus, Taxi

Construction
- Structure type: Concrete

History
- Opened: 23 February 1949; 77 years ago
- Closed: 2 September 2013
Location
- Location within Albania Location within Europe

Tirana railway station (Albanian: Stacioni hekurudhor i Tiranës) was the central railway terminal of Tirana, the capital and most populous city of the Republic of Albania. It was in operation from 1949 to 2013.

The station was the eastern terminus of the railway line between Tirana and Durrës, and was connected to other cities in Albania including Vlorë and Durrës. The railway station was said to have no luggage office. On 2 September 2013, the station was closed for passenger and freight transport, and was demolished to make room for a new boulevard that leads over the station area to the north. A completely new district will be created. As a result, the Tirana station was moved to Vorë in 2013, and later to the renovated Kashar station in May 2015. The former Kashar-Tiranë line around 10 km in length was replaced with a bus service.

In the northwestern district of Tirana, Laprakë, a new station will be built, which is planned as a multi-functional terminal for rail service, trams and buses. Until its opening, the railway transport between Tirana and Kashar remains closed.

== Station Reconstruction ==
During the modernization of the Tirana-Durrës line, it was announced that the end station in Tirana would be at the same location like the previous station, in the New Boulevard of Tirana. In 2026, after various delays in the process, Hekurudha Shqiptare opened the tender for the construction of about 4.2 kilometers of new railway line, which will connect the Public Transport Terminal, near the Kamza turn, with the Central Station in the capital. The line foresees two new urban stops, bridges, overpasses, including the station in Tirana, while intercity trains will end their journey at the terminal and will not enter the center. The deadline for the works is 24 months from the announcement of the winner.

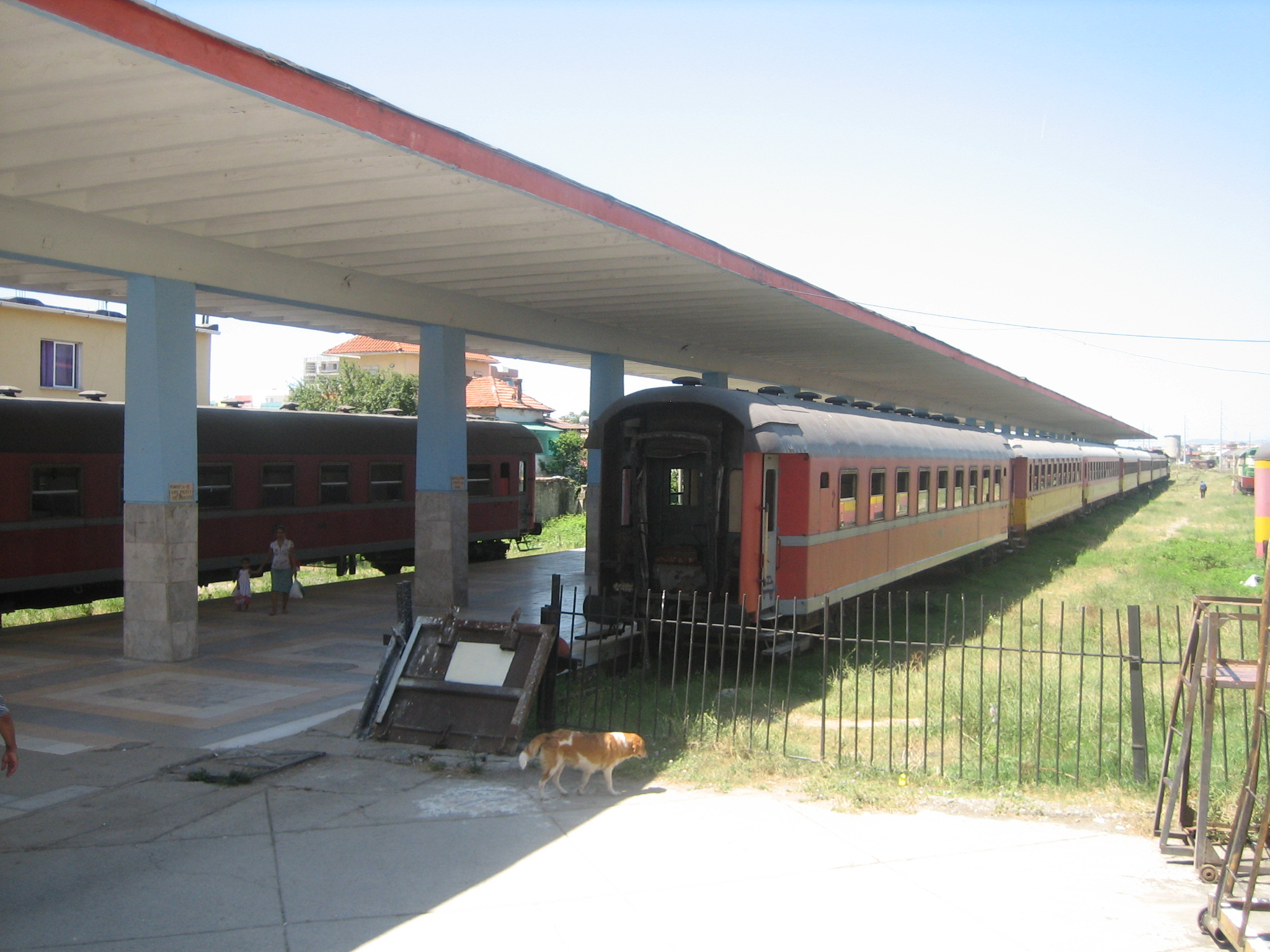

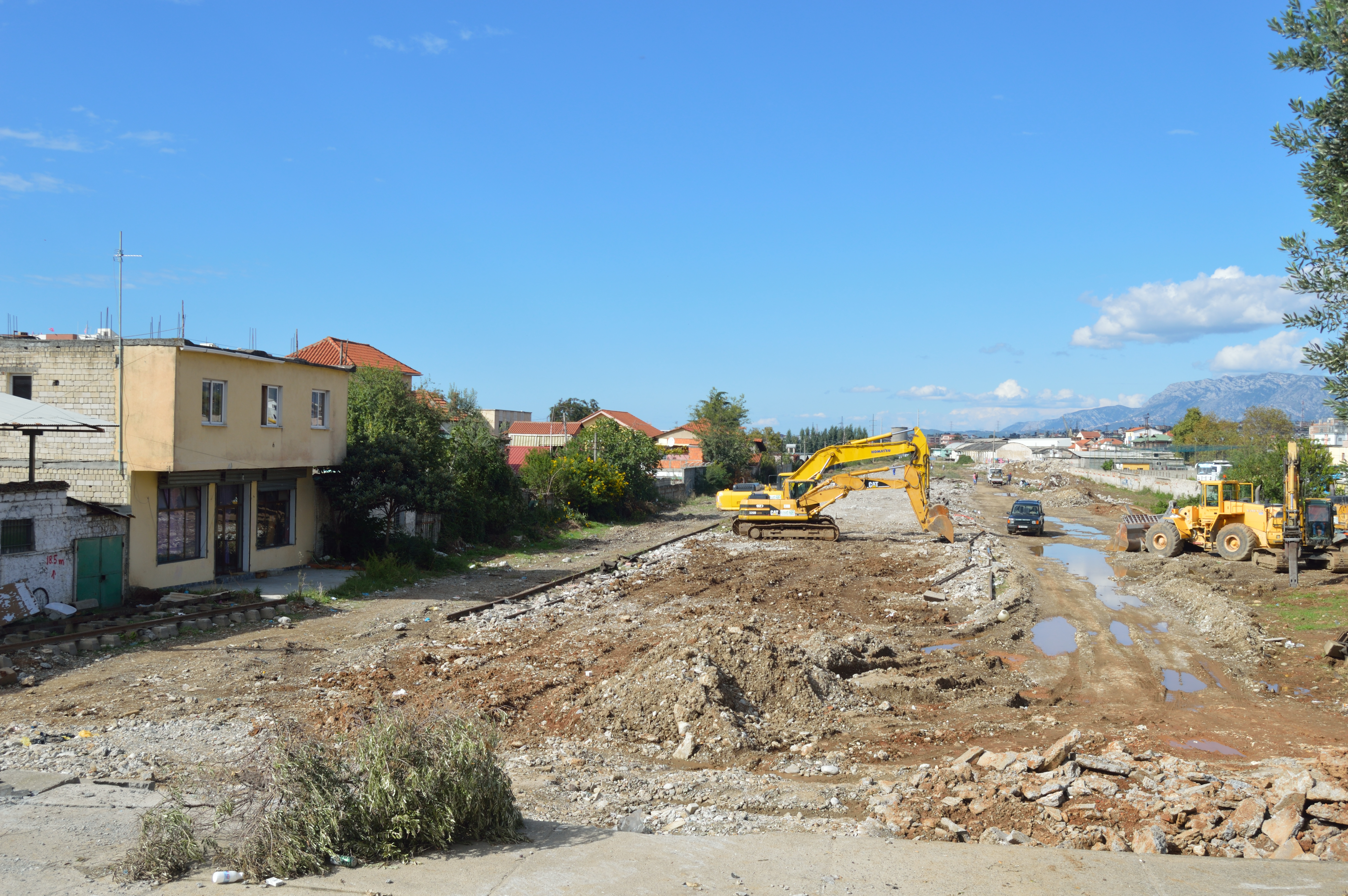
The station during demolition

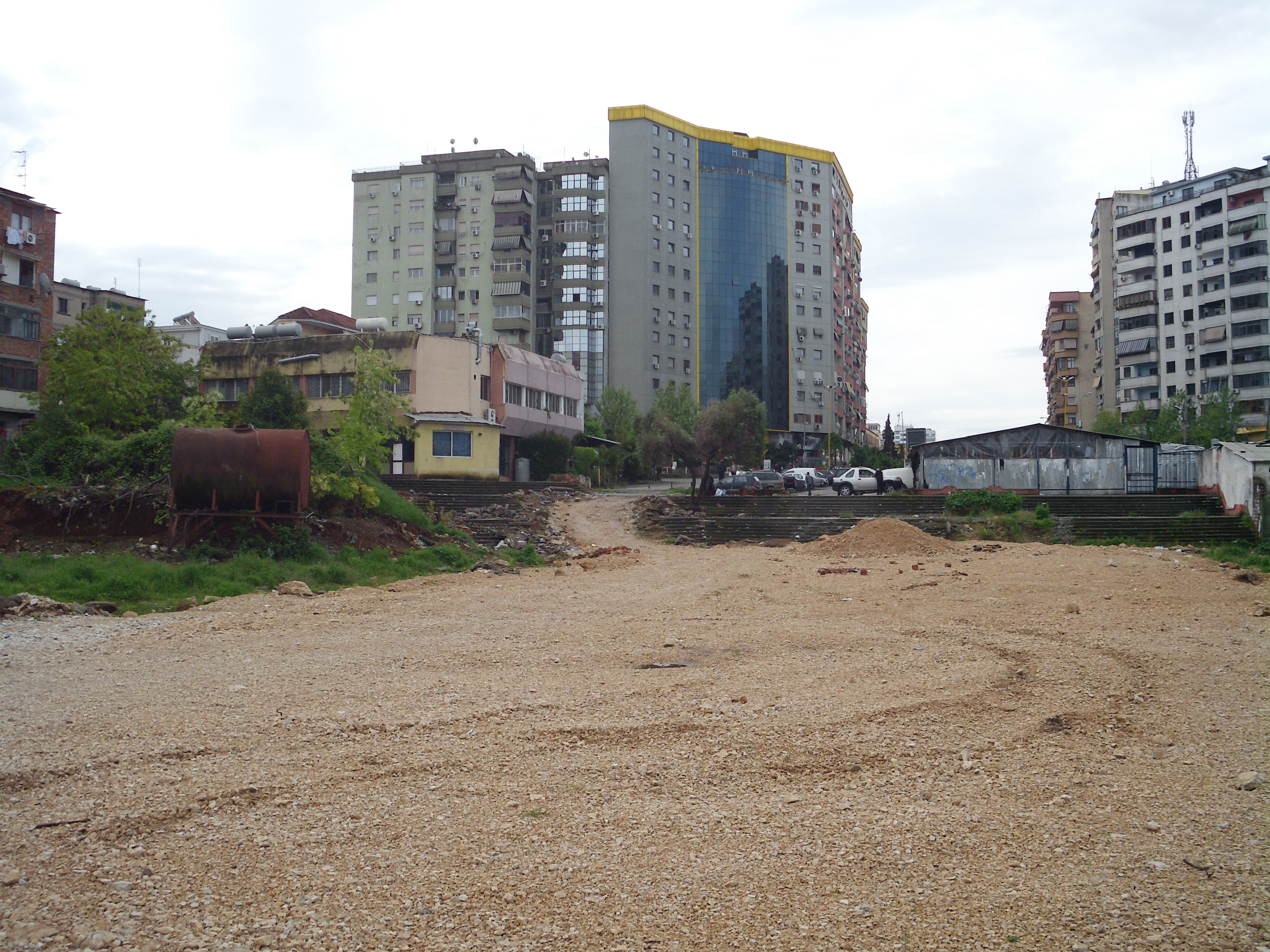
The site in 2014

== See also ==
- List of railway stations in Albania
- Rail transport in Albania
- History of rail transport in Albania
- Transport in Albania
