= Rrogozhinë railway station =

Railway station in Rrogozhinë, Albania

Rrogozhinë railway station Stacioni hekurudhor i Rrogozhinës
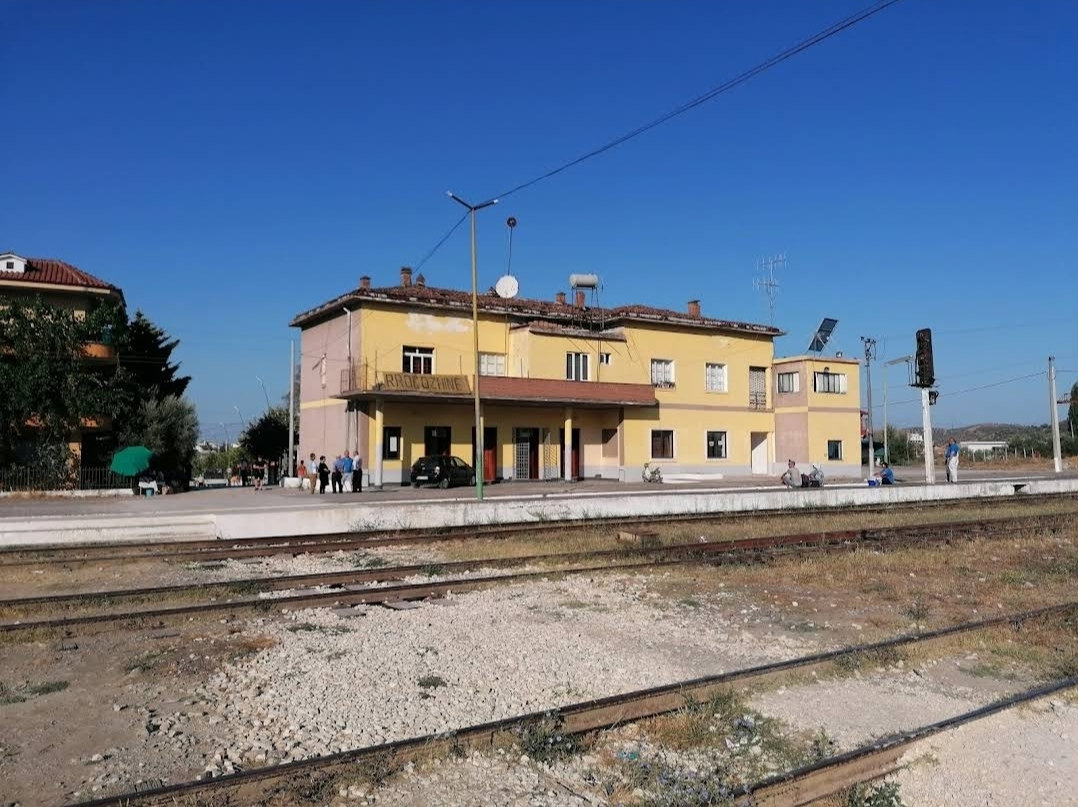
- The station of Rrogozhinë in 2021

General information
- Location: Rrogozhinë; Tirana County; Albania
- Coordinates: 41.0791°N 19.6674°E
- System: Hekurudha Shqiptare
- Lines: Durrës-Vlorë; Rrogozhinë–Elbasan(–Pogradec)

History
- Opened: November 7, 1947; 78 years ago
Location
- Location within Albania

Rrogozhinë railway station (Albanian: Stacioni hekurudhor i Rrogozhinës) is a railway station serving the town of Rrogozhinë in Tirana County in Central Albania.

The station opened in 1947 as part of the railway line from Durrës to Peqin. A branch line from Rrogozhinë to Fier was opened in 1968. This branch was extended to Vlorë in 1985.

== See also ==
- List of railway stations in Albania
- Rail transport in Albania
- History of rail transport in Albania
- Transport in Albania
