= Vorë railway station =

Former railway station in Vorë, Albania

Vorë railway station Stacioni hekurudhor i Vorë
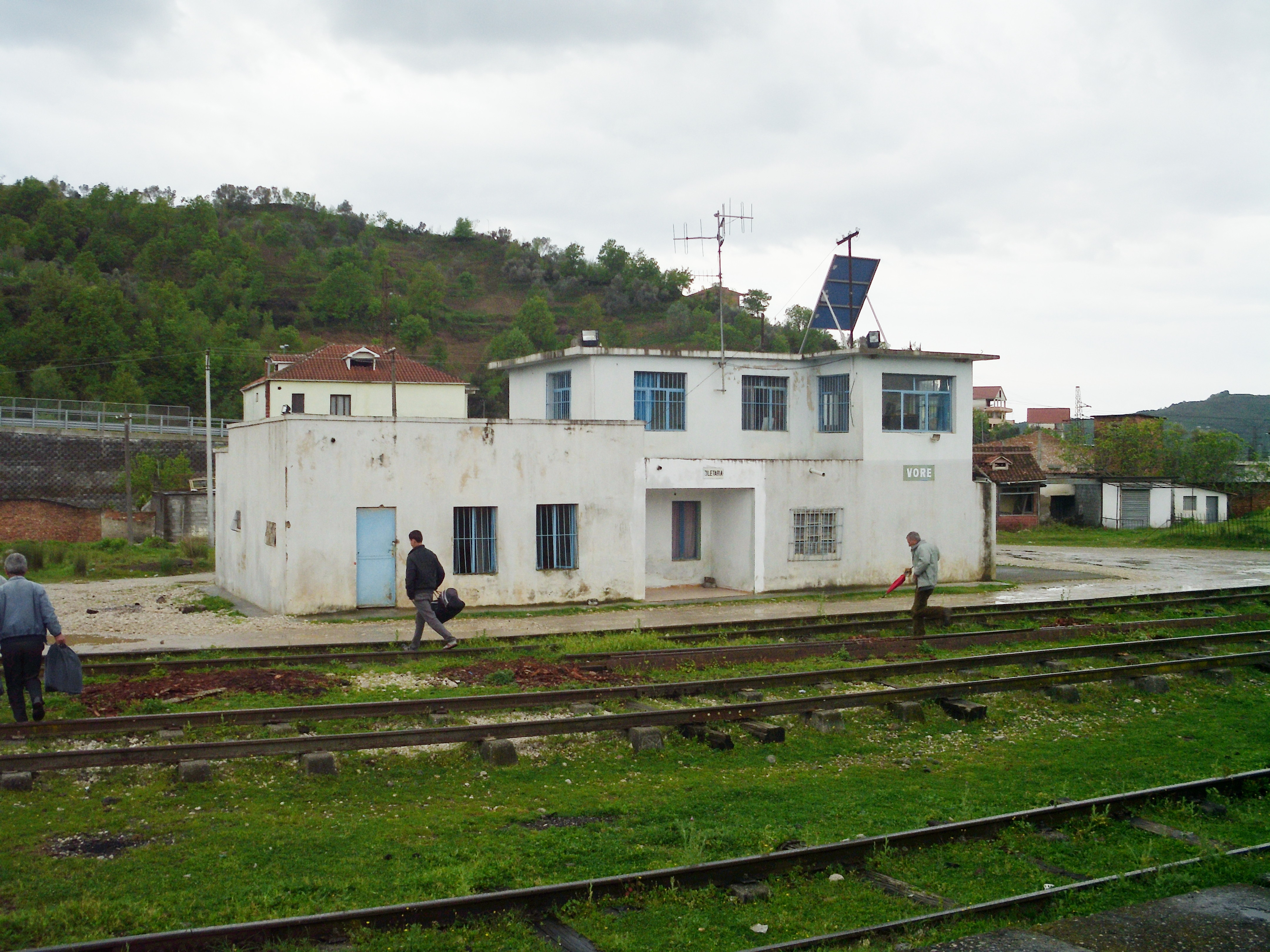
- Vorë station in 2014

General information
- Location: Vorë; Tirana County; Albania
- Coordinates: 41°24′03″N 19°38′54″E
- Operator: Hekurudha Shqiptare
- Lines: Durrës–Tiranë railway Shkodër–Vorë railway
- Platforms: 4
- Connections: Bus, Taxi

History
- Opened: 1949
- Closed: after 2014
Location
- Location within Albania Location within Europe

Vorë railway station (Albanian: Stacioni hekurudhor i Vorë) was a railway station serving the town of Vorë in Tirana County in Central Albania.

The station was connected to Durrës and the capital Tirana and was once an important interchange, being the junction for services from Durrës and Tirana, now closed, as well as those from Shkodër in the north, also closed except between Shkodër and Lac. After many years of neglect, the station was demolished and all tracks were removed.

== Future plans ==
The Vorë railway station has been included in a project to rehabilitate and electrify the railway from Vorë to Hani i Hotit. Construction work is scheduled to start in 2027 and end by the 2030s.

== Gallery ==
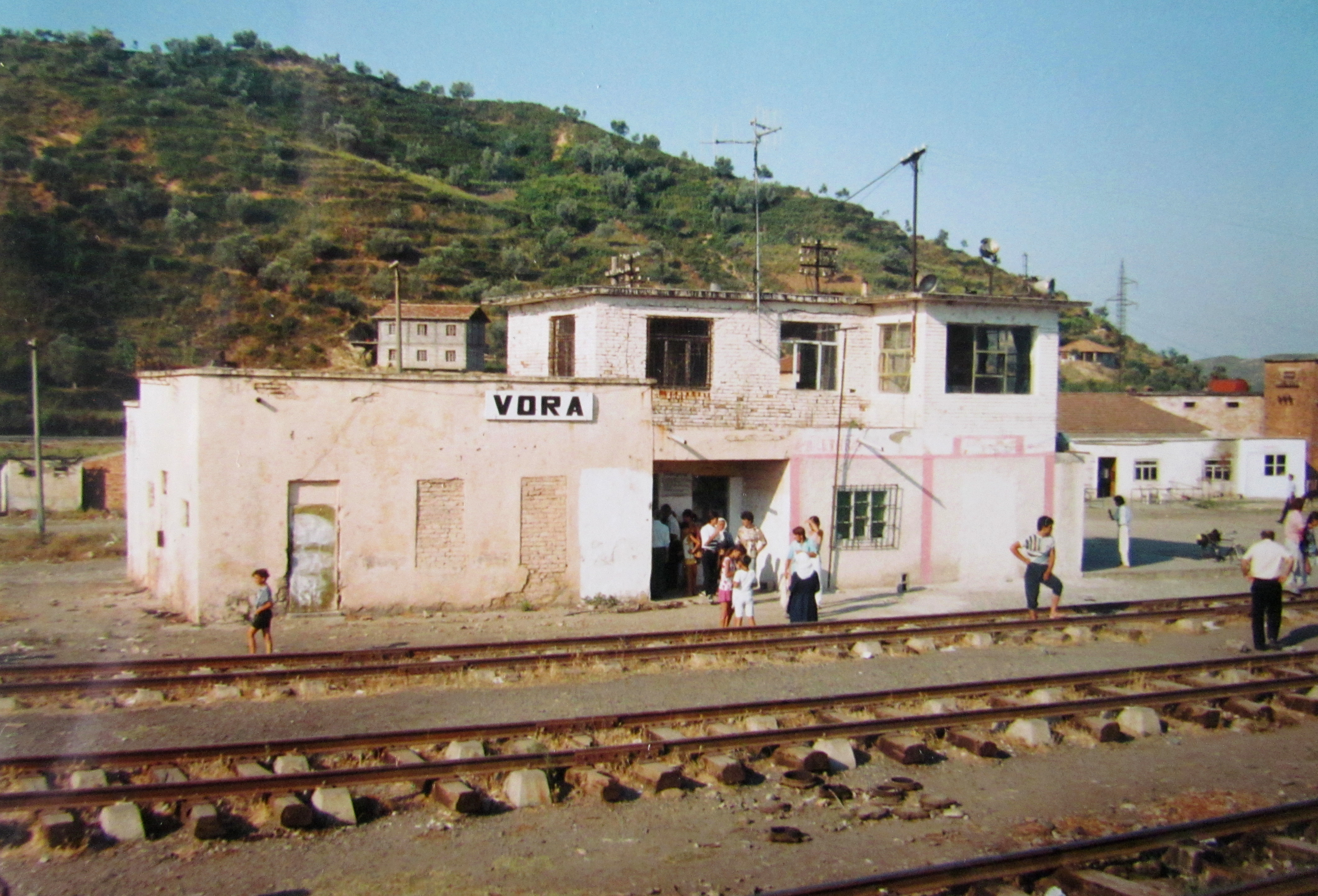
The station in 1995

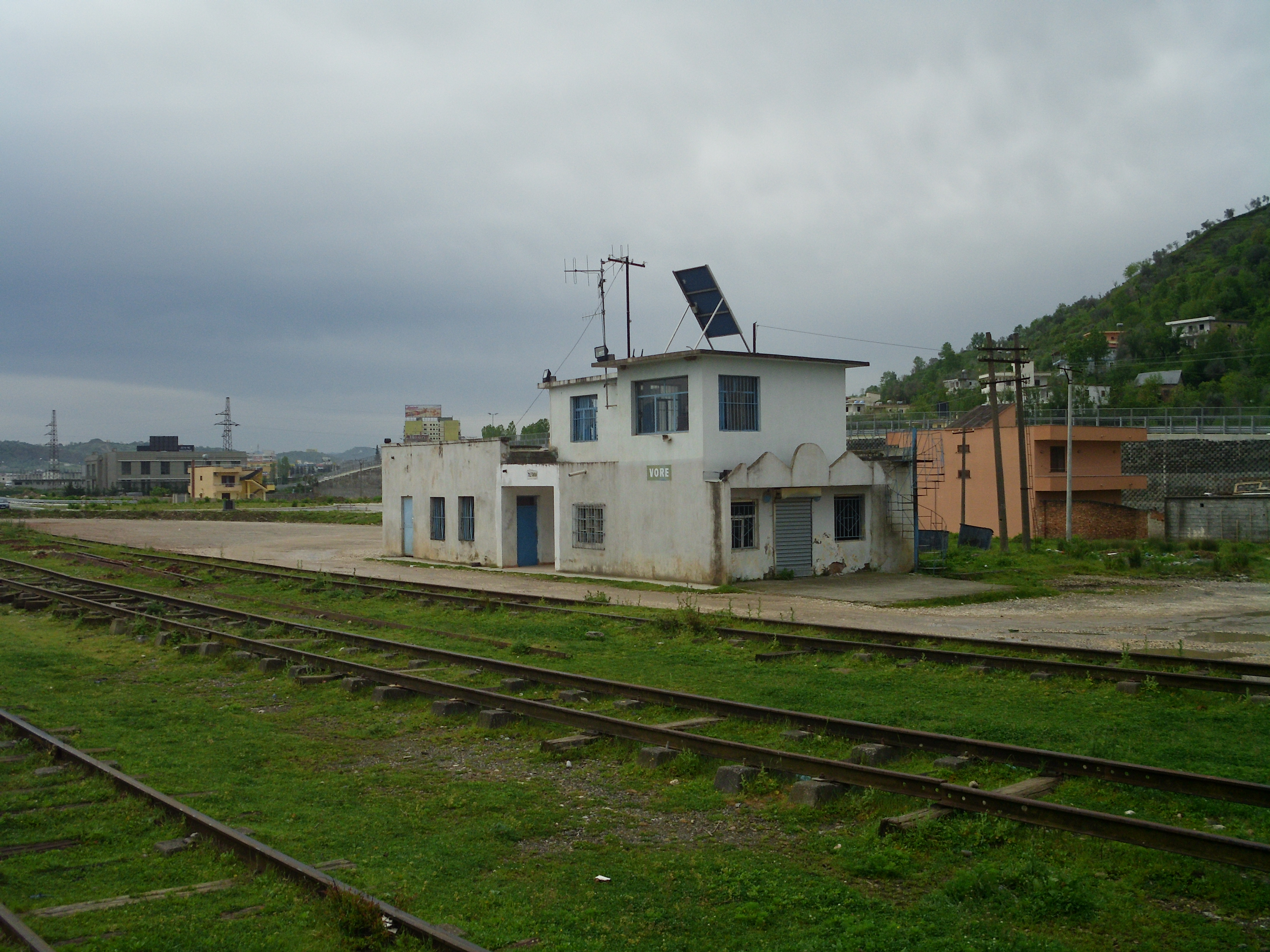
2014

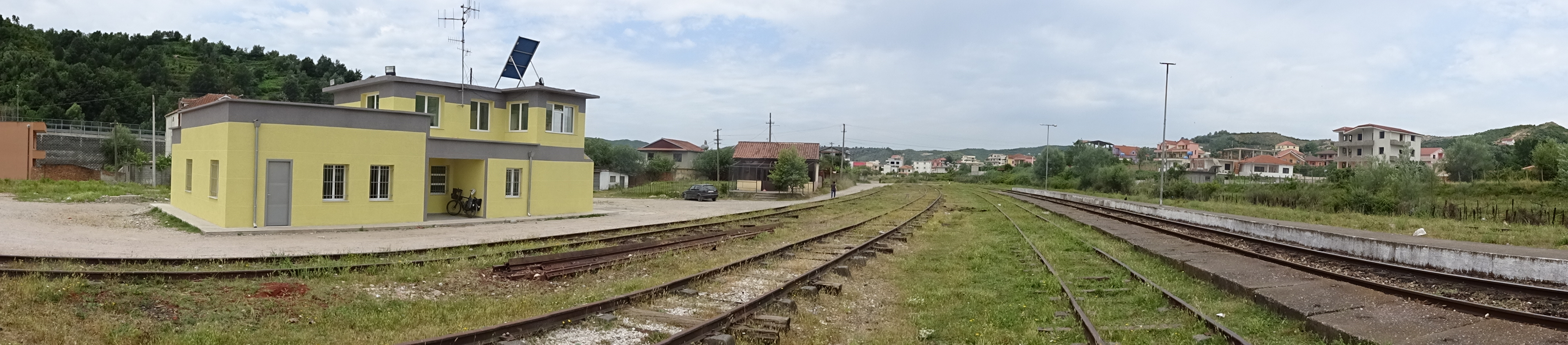
Refurbished station in 2016

== See also ==
- List of railway stations in Albania
- Rail transport in Albania
- History of rail transport in Albania
- Transport in Albania
- Durrës–Tiranë railway
- Shkodër–Vorë railway
