= Kashar railway station =

Railway station in Kashar, Albania

Kashar railway station Stacioni hekurudhor i Kasharit
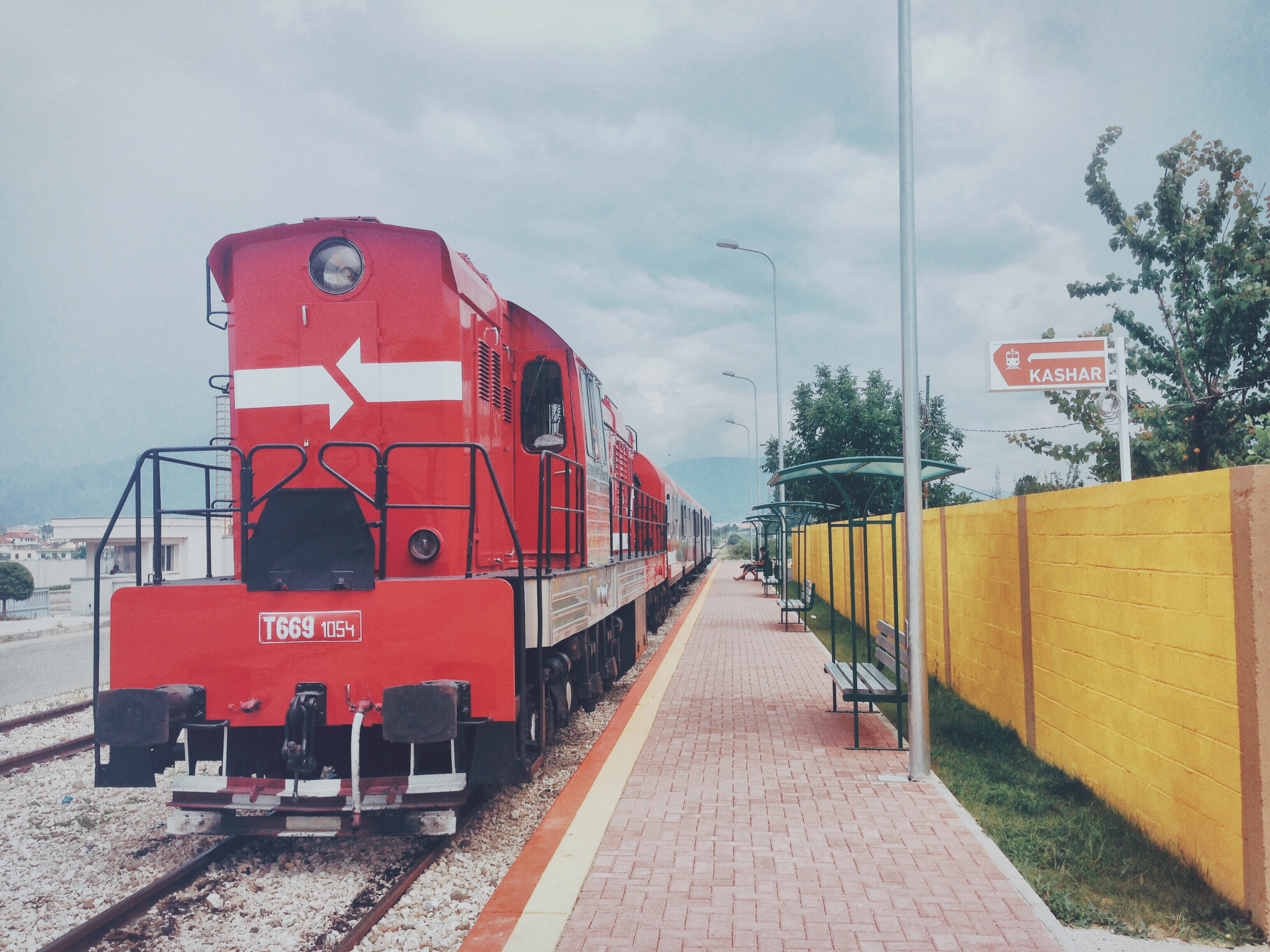
- The station on reopening in 2015

General information
- Location: Kashar; Tirana; Albania
- Coordinates: 41.3585°N 19.7409°E
- System: Hekurudha Shqiptare
- Line: Durrës–Tiranë
- Platforms: 1

History
- Opened: 1949
- Rebuilt: 2015
Location
- Location within Albania

Kashar railway station (Albanian: Stacioni hekurudhor i Kasharit) is a railway station which serves the municipality of Kashar on the outskirts of Tirana, Albania.

The branch from Vora to Tirana was closed in 2013 and passenger workings were replaced by a bus service. In 2015, the bus journey was shortened when Kashar station re-opened with the benefit of a refurbishment, allowing travelers to journey to at least the outskirts of Tirana. The new service was inaugurated on 26 May by then-Parliamentary Speaker Ilir Meta and Minister of Transport and Infrastructure Edmond Haxhinasto. Despite the optimism which accompanied the refurbishment and reopening of Kashar station, Tirana's mayor, Lulzim Basha, criticised the delay in the reopening of the remainder of the line to Tirana, as Kashar is still ten kilometers away from the city centre, with the distance and the slow operating speeds meaning that the service was underused.

Limited services continued to terminate at Kashar until 2018, after which there was no direct railway connection between Durrës and Tirana.

The railway is currently undergoing major reconstruction as part of the Durrës–Tirana Public Transport Terminal (PTT) railway project, which includes rehabilitation of the existing line, construction of a new railway connection to Tirana International Airport, modern signalling and telecommunications systems, and full electrification. The rebuilt railway is expected to begin operations by the end of 2027.

== See also ==
- List of railway stations in Albania
- Rail transport in Albania
- History of rail transport in Albania
- Transport in Albania
- Durrës–Tiranë railway
