= Narrow-gauge railways in Albania =

Between 1917 and 1930 approximately 300 km of military and industrial narrow-gauge railways were built at the gauge of 600 mm (1 ft 11 5/8 in) and 750 mm (2 ft 5 1/2 in) or Bosnian gauge (760 mm (2 ft 5 15/16 in)), built by Austria-Hungarians and Italians, intending to create a through route from Skopje and Tetovo to the Adriatic coast of Albania. None of these railways remained intact.

== Overview ==
- 760 mm (2 ft 5 15/16 in)
  - Shkodër–Vlorë
  - Lezhë–Velipoje
  - Ishem–Tirana
  - Rrogozhinë–Strmen
  - Lushnjë–Berat
- 50 km of 600 mm (1 ft 11 5/8 in) gauge line, built 1917-1918 and destroyed 1918.
- 750 mm (2 ft 5 1/2 in) gauge private mineral lines in the Patok and Sukth area. 1930s and 1940s.
- Military line between Shkozet and Lekaj during World War II, converted to standard gauge after 1945, being the first standard-gauge line in Albania.
- From Vlorë an inland line was built for bitumen traffic by the Societa Italiana delle Miniere di Selenizza (SIMS). Constructed in 1930 at the gauge of 900 mm (2 ft 11 7/16 in), the line was later converted to 600 mm (1 ft 11 5/8 in) gauge and closed in the early 1990s.
- North from Vlorë an inland line was built serving salt flats at Narte, now closed. The railway used three Lyd2 locomotives.
- Struga via Tetovo to Skopje for the chrome ore mine in Pogradec. (Partly in North Macedonia, closed.)

== See also ==
- Rail transport in Albania
- History of rail transport in Albania
