= Durrës-Vlorë railway =

Railway line in Albania

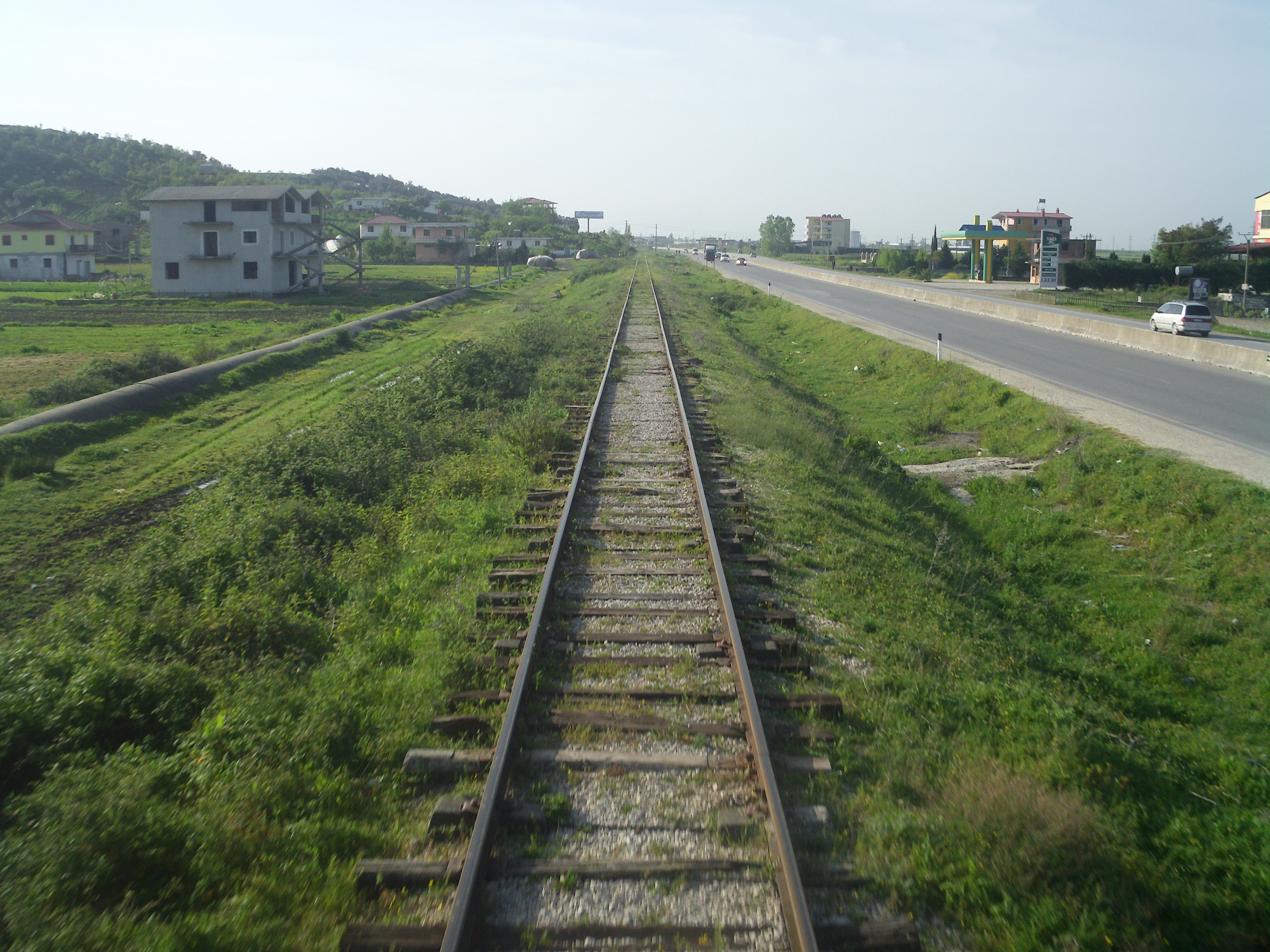
- Line between Libofsh and Gradisht

Overview
- Stations: 16

Service
- Operator(s): Hekurudha Shqiptare

Technical
- Track gauge: 1,435 mm (4 ft 8 1/2 in) standard gauge

The Durrës-Vlorë railway is a now mostly disused railway line connecting the cities of Durrës and Vlorë in western Albania. Vlorë station is the southernmost point on the Albanian rail system.

== History ==
Before the inauguration of the national network in the 1940s, two separate systems existed south of Durrës on routes later absorbed by the present railway: a 19-mile Decauville track which carried Bitumen traffic from a mine at Selence to the port of Skele near Vlorë, and a 2-mile track connecting Shkozet and Lekaj.

The present railway was built in stages. Rrogozhinë was the southernmost station in Albania until 1968, when an extension to Fier was completed. A further extension to Ballsh opened in 1975, and Vlorë was reached through another extension in 1985.

A limited service was still in operation on the line until 2015, but passenger services no longer run south of Fier.

A private railway company, Albrail, was granted a concession to the railway section between Fier and Vlorë in February 2016 and started transporting crude oil from Fier to Vlorë in December 2018.

== Stations ==
Station	Image	Opened	Additional information
Durrës		1949	
Shkozet		1949	
Plazh			Temporary terminus in 2024/25 during the reconstruction of Durrës station
Golem			
Kavajë			
Lekaj			
Rrogozhinë			
Dushk		1968	
Lushnjë		1968	
Gradisht		1968	
Libofsh		1968	
Fier		1968	
Ballsh		1975	No current service
Levan		1985	No current service
Novoselë		1985	Closed 1997
Narte		1985	No current service
Vlorë		1985	No current service

== See also ==
- Hekurudha Shqiptare (Albanian Railways)
- Albrail
- Rail transport in Albania
- History of rail transport in Albania
- Transport in Albania
