= PKP class TKt48 =

Class of Polish 2-8-2T locomotives

PKP/HSH TKt48
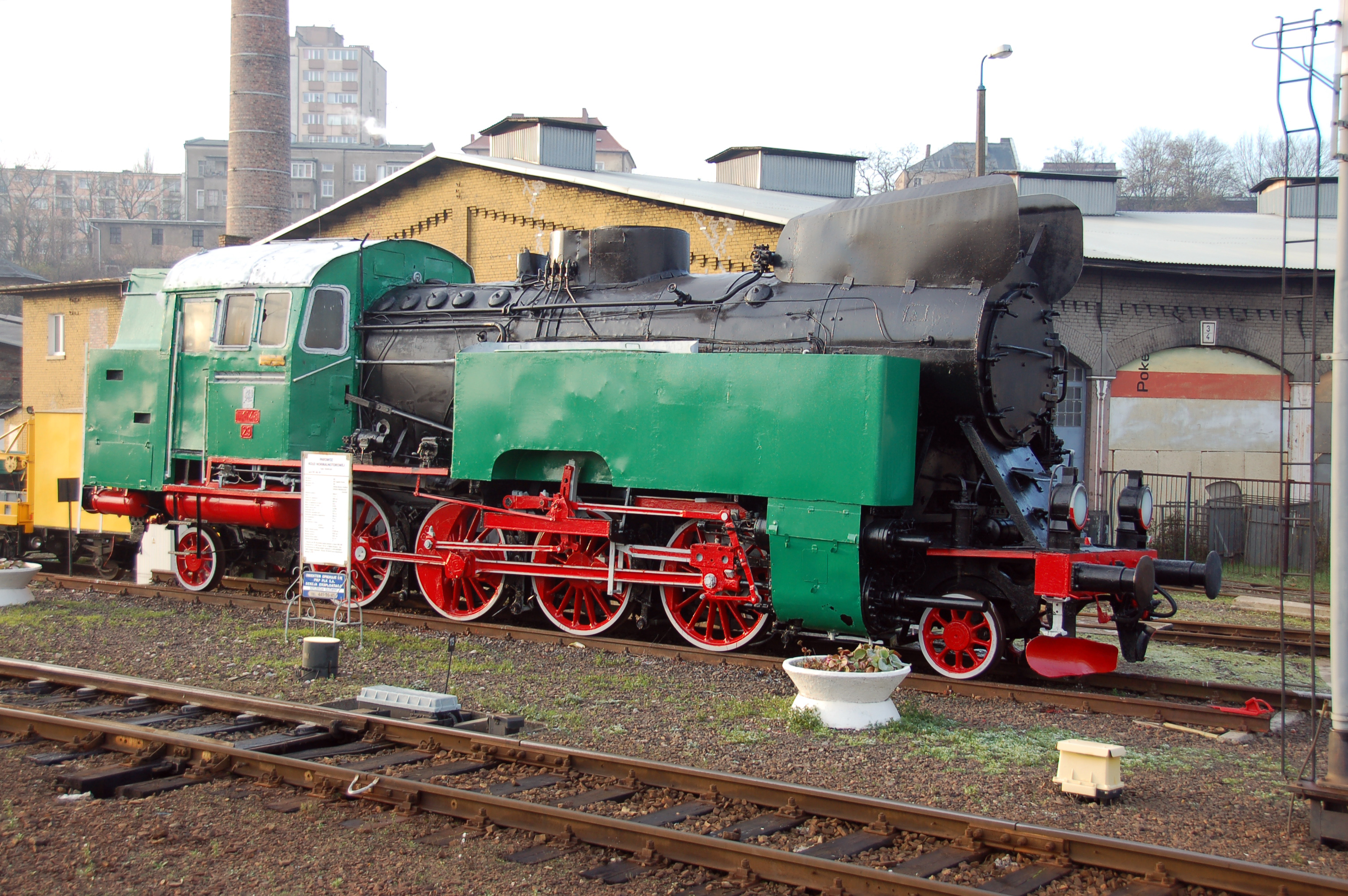
- TKt48 in 2010
Type and origin
- Power type: Steam
- Builder: Fablok, HCP
- Model: HSH: 1681-1684, 2922, 2923; HSH (other source): 13028-13029, 13052, 13067, 13072-13073
- Build date: 1950-1957
- Total produced: 293
Specifications
- Configuration
  - UIC: 1′D1'
- Gauge: 1,435 mm (4 ft 8 1/2 in)
- Driver dia.: 1,450 mm (57.09 in)
- Length: 14.200 m (46 ft 7 in)
- Width: 3.100 m (10 ft 2 in)
- Height: 4.532 m (14 ft 10 in)
- Loco weight: 78.0 tonnes (76.8 long tons; 86.0 short tons)
- Fuel type: Coal
- Boiler pressure: 16 kg/cm^{2} (1.57 MPa; 228 psi)
- Cylinder size: 500 mm × 500 mm (19.69 in × 19.69 in)
- Loco brake: Air
- Train brakes: Air
Performance figures
- Maximum speed: 80 km/h (50 mph)
- Power output: 785 kW
Career
- Operators: PKP; HSH
- Numbers: PKP: TKt48-1 - 191; HSH: 48.01 - 48.06
- Delivered: 1951, 1952
- Last run: HSH: 1991

The PKP class TKt48 was a class of freight tank (TK) 2-8-2 (t) steam locomotive of the Polish State Railways (PKP). Originally intended for use in suburban traffic, the locomotives were later mainly used for passenger and freight trains on the low mountain range in southern Poland. Six locomotives were sold to Albania.

The locomotive was designed in the central Polish design office in Poznan from 1948. The basis of the construction were never implemented plans for a series 83 of the DR, which came from the Linke-Hofmann-Werke in Breslau. In the years 1950–57, over 200 locomotives were supplied by the Polish locomotive factories Cegielski and Fablok, 191 of which were delivered to PKP.

The locomotives proved to be unsuitable for their original application in fast suburban traffic because of their rather low power. Thanks to the relatively high frictional mass, however, the locomotives were ideal for operation on the low mountain range. On the routes in the Giant Mountains and in the foothills of the High Tatras, the locomotives proved themselves as real universal locomotives. In addition, due to the top speed of 80 kilometres per hour (50 mph) in both directions of travel, these machines do not have to be turned - a major advantage when they are used on secondary routes.

The locomotives were still in scheduled use in large numbers until the end of the 1980s. It was only when most of the branch lines in Poland were closed in 1989 that the locomotives were no longer used. Most of them were decommissioned and scrapped but many survived into preservation and were restored to operational condition.

== Albania ==
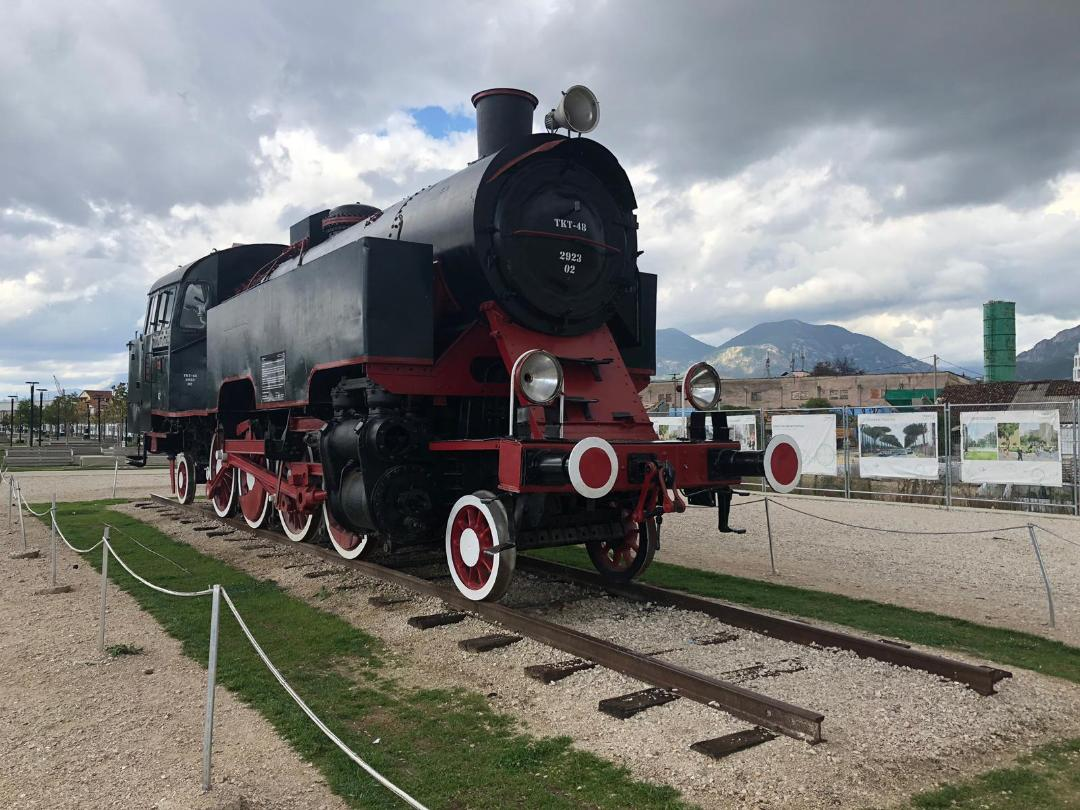
The TKt48-02 at former Tirana railway station

The Albanian railway Hekurudha Shqiptare had acquired six new locomotives in the late 1950s. The "avullore" were in use until 1986 with a last special run in 1991. At first they pulled passenger and freight trains on the Durrës – Peqin line, Albania's first railway line. They were later used in the port of Durrës and at the Shkozet depot for shunting freight wagons.

== Preservation ==
The following locomotives have been preserved:

- TKt48-138 at Carska Restaurant at Białowieza Towarowa Station (currently not operational)
- TKt48-191 in the Museum of Vehicles and Railway Technology in Chabówka as an operational museum locomotive
- TKt48-188 in Saint-Sulpice (Switzerland) as an operational museum locomotive
- TKt48-147, TKt48-143 in the Wolsztyn steam plant (currently not operational)
- TKt48-177 as a monument locomotive in Nowy Sącz
- TKt48-53 as a monument locomotive in Iława
- TKt48-18 (as an operational museum locomotive), TKt48–67, TKt48–100, TKt48–173 in Jaworzyna Śląska
- TKt48-102 in Jasło
- TKt48-58 as a monument locomotive in Jelenia Góra
- TKt48-119 as a monument locomotive in Wałbrzych
- TKt48-29 as a monument locomotive in Szczecin Główny
- TKt48-146 as the club's own (KSK) locomotive in Breslau, intended for operational refurbishment
- TKt48-160 as private property in the roundhouse of the Museumseisenbahn Hanau in refurbishment
- TKt48 2923-02 as an exhibition object in Tirana, Albania
- TKt48-87 in CVF3V (Mariembourg - Treignes), Belgium. Operational.
- Tkt48 - 124 as a monument locomotive in Zagórz, Pologne
- Tkt48 - (unknown number) sitting abandoned at a roundhouse in krakow
- TKt48-170 as a monument at the Tczew station
