= Durrës railway station =

Railway station in Durrës, Albania

Durrës railway station Stacioni hekurudhor i Durrësit
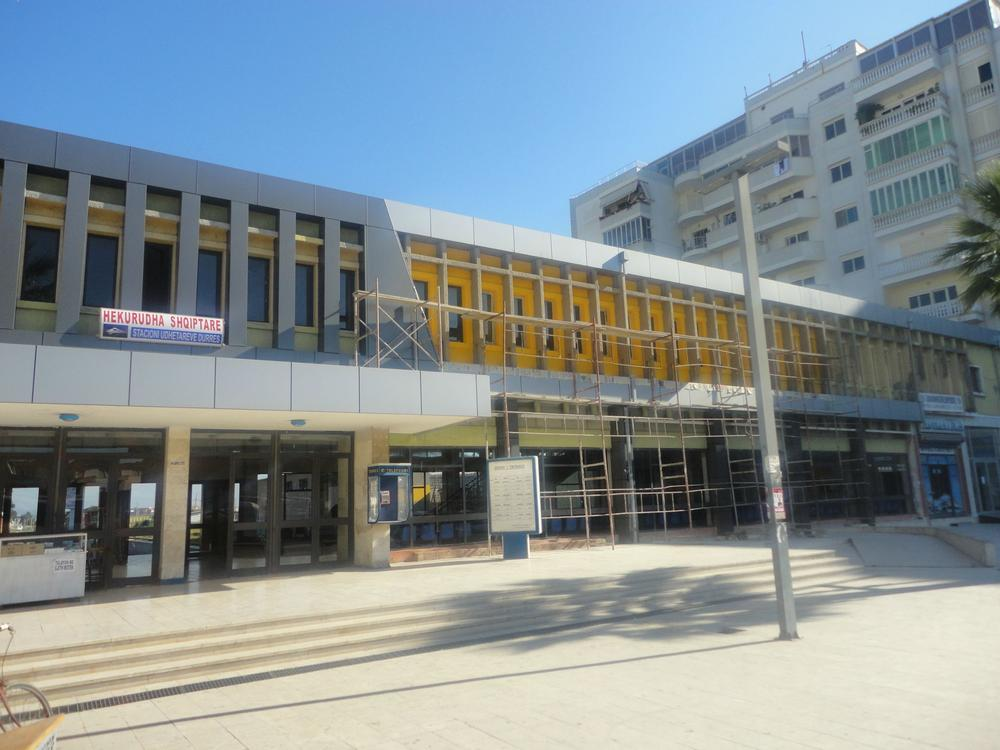
- Front facade of Durrës station

General information
- Location: Durrës; Albania
- Coordinates: 41.3179°N 19.455°E
- System: Terminal railway station
- Operator: Hekurudha Shqiptare
- Lines: Durrës–Tiranë; Durrës-Vlorë
- Connections: Bus, Taxi

Other information
- Website: https://hekurudha.al/

History
- Opened: 1949
Location
- Location within Albania Location within Europe

Durrës railway station (Albanian: Stacioni hekurudhor i Durrësit) is the main railway terminal serving the port city of Durrës in central Albania, the second most populous city of the Republic of Albania. It is located in the city centre, close to the Port of Durrës, at the intersection of Rruga Adria and Rruga Egnatia. There is also a station for intercity buses in front of the railway station building.

The station is the hub of the Albanian railway network, and is connected by rail to other cities in Albania, including the capital of Tirana, Vlorë, Elbasan and Shkodër.

== History ==
The establishment of the station and the railway connection to the largest Albanian port was already foreseen by the Italian occupation administration during the Second World War; it was implemented only after the end of the conflict. The station came into operation in 1947, with the opening of the railway line from Durrës to Peqin, the first standard-gauge railway line in Albania. before the country's first full-length railway section was completed.

The official commissioning took place on 23 February 1949, when the Tirana station and the line between Durrës and the capital Tirana were put into service.

In 2014, the façade of the station was rebuilt and some services were modernized.

== Architecture ==
The modernist station building was built between 1940 and 1949.

== See also ==
- List of railway stations in Albania
- Rail transport in Albania
- History of rail transport in Albania
- Transport in Albania
- Durrës–Tiranë railway
- Durrës–Vlorë railway
