= Western Balkans Investment Framework =

EU infrastructure investment initiative in the Western Balkans

The Western Balkans Investment Framework (WBIF) is a joint financing initiative established by the European Union in 2009 to support the socio-economic development and EU integration of the Western Balkans. The WBIF blends grants, loans, and technical assistance to enable the implementation of large-scale infrastructure projects in six partner economies: Albania, Bosnia and Herzegovina, Kosovo, Montenegro, North Macedonia, and Serbia.

As a flagship instrument of the EU’s Economic and Investment Plan for the Western Balkans, the WBIF contributes to the region’s alignment with EU standards in areas such as transport, energy, environmental protection, digitalisation, and social infrastructure. It also supports the objectives of the Green Agenda for the Western Balkans and enhances the region’s connectivity, resilience, and preparedness for EU membership.

The main goals of the WBIF include accelerating the implementation of strategic infrastructure projects consistent with EU policy and the Trans-European Transport Network (TEN-T), facilitating the accession process by supporting institutional reforms and cross-border cooperation, and mobilising both public and private sector financing through blended financial mechanisms.

The framework operates through a combination of funding instruments. These include EU grants, predominantly provided via the Instrument for Pre-Accession Assistance (IPA III), and loans from several international financial institutions, such as the European Investment Bank (EIB), the European Bank for Reconstruction and Development (EBRD), KfW (Germany), the Council of Europe Development Bank, and the World Bank Group. Technical assistance and investment preparation support are also integral to the WBIF's operations, ensuring that projects are well-developed and ready for implementation.

The WBIF is governed by a Steering Committee composed of representatives from the European Commission, EU member states, the contributing financial institutions, and the six Western Balkan partner economies. Day-to-day coordination is handled by the WBIF Secretariat, which is hosted by the EIB.

The WBIF targets investment in five key sectors: transport (including roads, railways, ports, and airports), energy (such as electricity transmission networks and renewable energy), the environment (notably water supply and waste management), digital infrastructure (including broadband and 5G readiness), and social infrastructure (notably healthcare and education).

As of 2024, the WBIF had supported more than 260 infrastructure projects, provided over €3 billion in EU investment grants, and mobilised total investments exceeding €24 billion. All six partner economies have benefited from WBIF financing and capacity-building.

Prominent projects include the rehabilitation of the Tirana–Durrës–Rinas railway in Albania, which is co-financed by a €35.5 million EU grant, a €36.9 million EBRD loan, and a national contribution. Other notable initiatives include the upgrade of sections of Rail Corridor Vc in Bosnia and Herzegovina and the construction of gas interconnectors between Serbia and Bulgaria to enhance regional energy security.
