= History of rail transport in Albania =

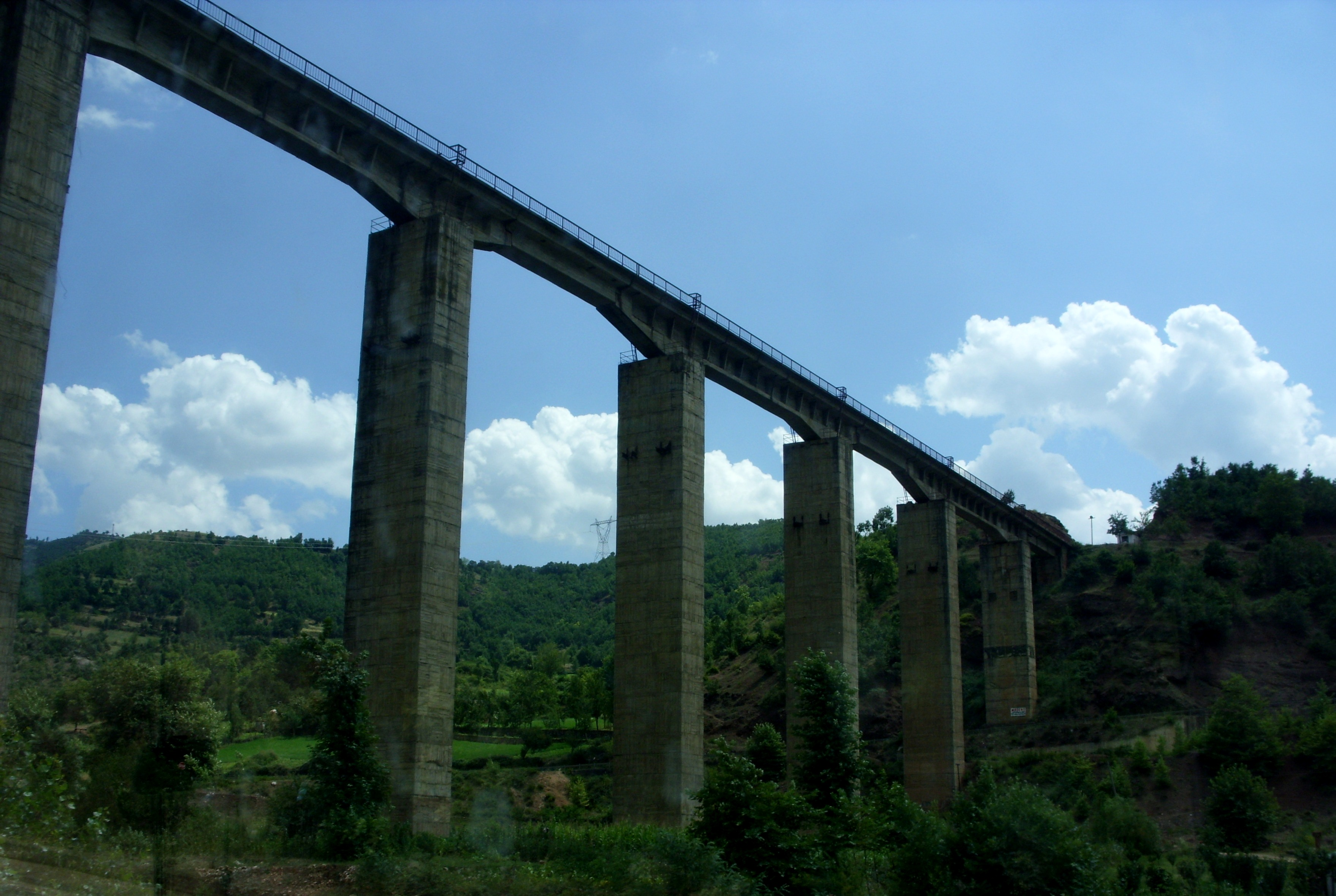
The Bushtrica Bridge in eastern Albania (built in 1973)

The history of rail transport in Albania may have begun as early as 1890. Until the end of World War II, Albania's railways were all narrow gauge lines, built to serve either minesites or military purposes. In 1947 shortly after the establishment of the People's Republic of Albania, the country acquired its first standard gauge public railway. The Communist government, led by Enver Hoxha, extensively promoted Albania's railway network, in particular by effectively prohibiting the use of private transport.

Since the end of communism, there has been a considerable increase in car ownership and bus usage in Albania. While some of the country's roads remain in poorer condition, there is major redevelopment taking place, such as the opening of a motorway between Tirana and Durrës.

== See also ==
- History of rail transport
- History of Albania
- Rail transport in Albania
- Narrow-gauge railways in Albania
