= Rail transport in Albania =

Railway transport system

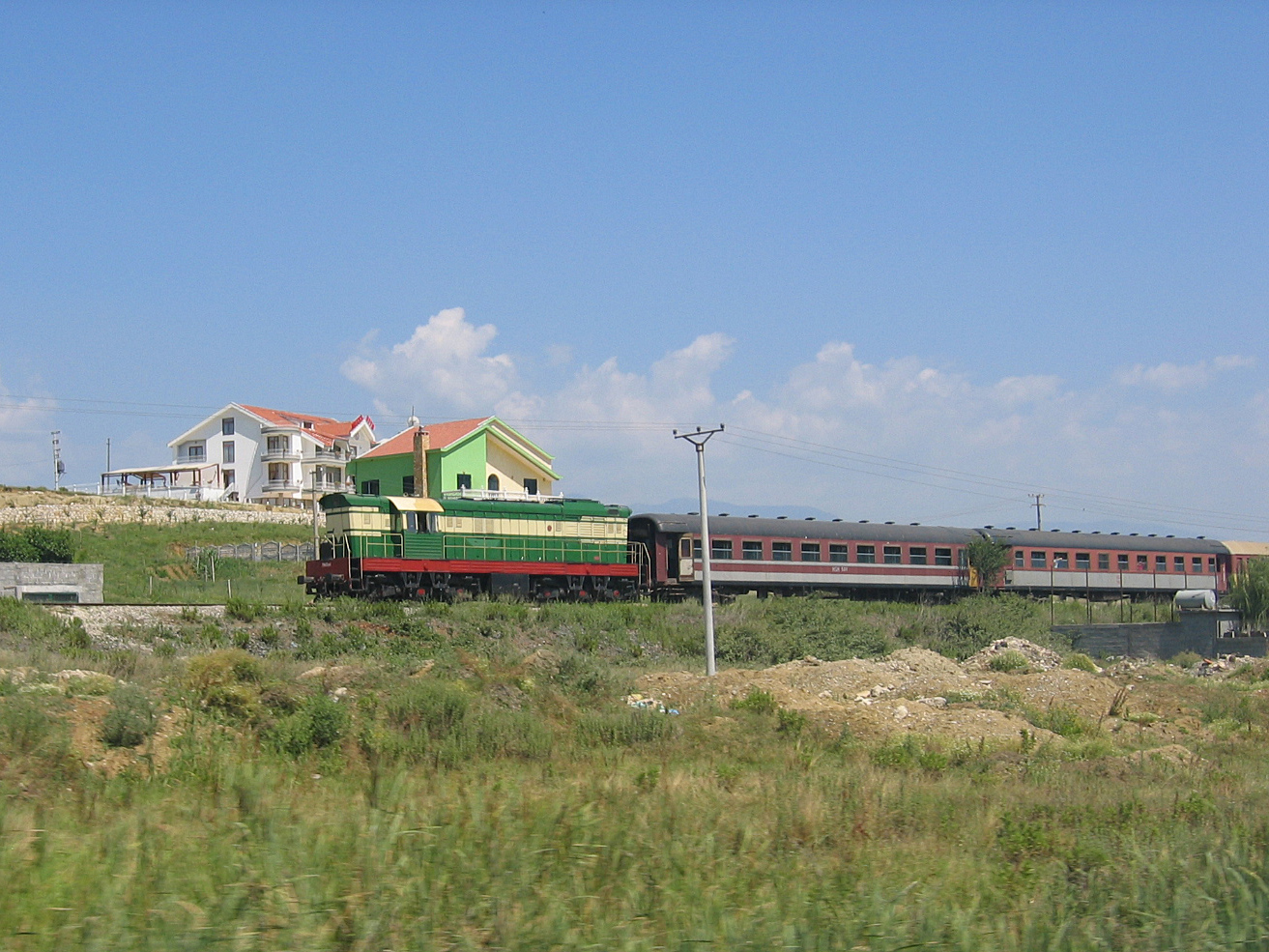
- HSH train on the Tirana-Durrës line

Operation
- National railway: Hekurudha Shqiptare

Statistics
- Freight: 0.34 million tonne-km (2017)

System length
- Total: 424 kilometres (263 mi)
- Double track: 0 km (0 mi)
- Electrified: 0 km (0 mi)

Track gauge
- Main: 1,435 mm (4 ft 8 1/2 in) standard gauge
- High-speed: 1,435 mm (4 ft 8 1/2 in)

Features
Map
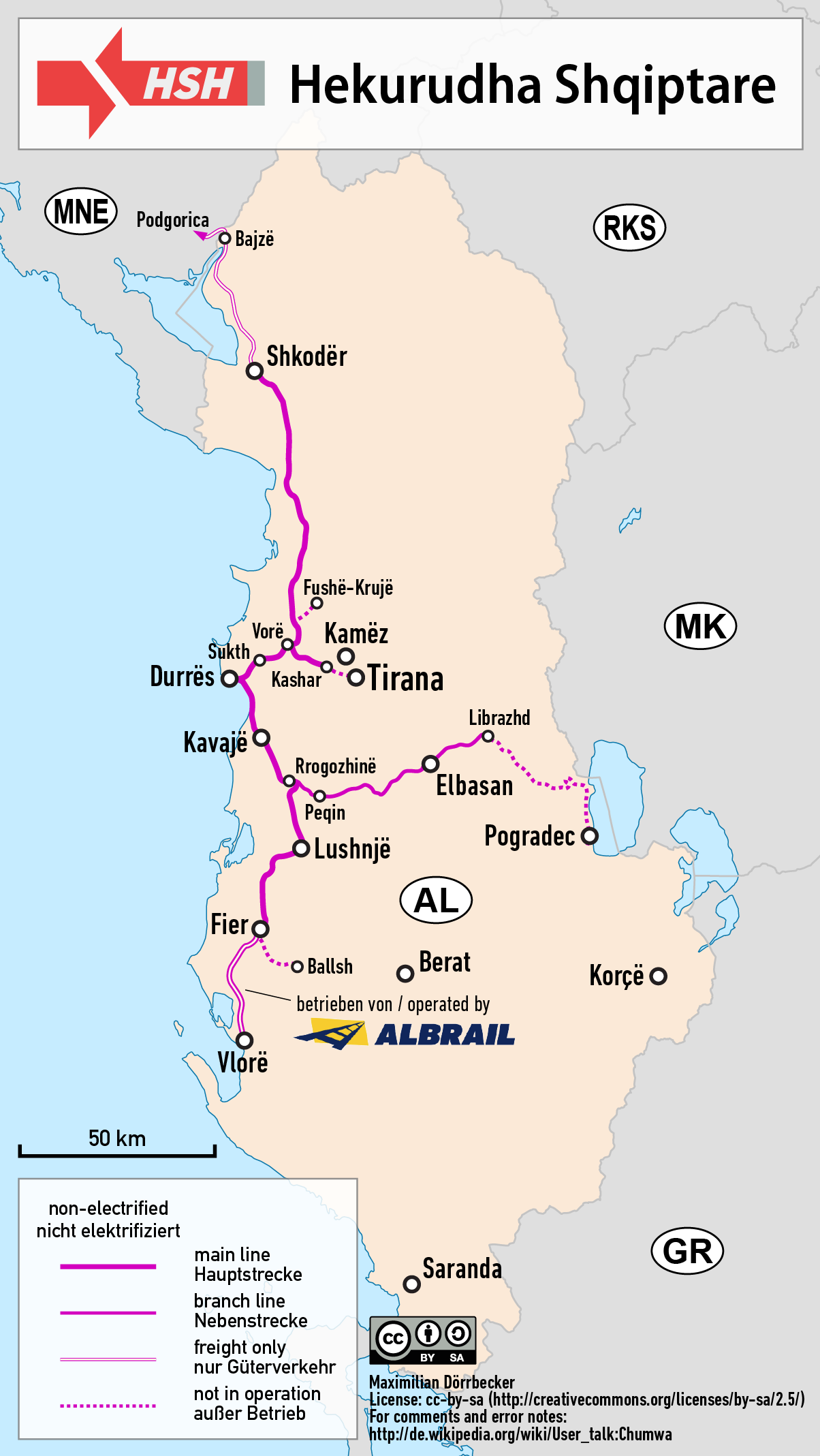
- Historic map.Most lines are now closed.

Railways in Albania are administered by the national railway company Hekurudha Shqiptare (HSH) (Albanian Railways). It operates a standard-gauge railway gauge (1,435 mm (4 ft 8 1/2 in)) rail system in Albania. All trains are, currently, hauled by Czechoslovak-built ČKD diesel-electric locomotives.

The small system, now mostly dysfunctional, was considered by many travel guides as a tourist attraction and de facto a panoramic train journey, however the railway from Elbasan to Pogradec, often considered to be the most scenic part of the railway, was closed in 2012 due to the poor condition of the line and the structures along it. The Section of the Shkodër - Vora line south of Laç is closed. The tracks on the Tirana - Durrës line have been removed as it is currently undergoing rehabilitation works. The Durrës - Elbasan service had its Durrës-bound terminus moved up the line to Plazhi due to rehabilitation works at the Durrës station. This is currently the only operating passenger rail service in the country, running every Friday, Saturday, and Sunday.

There is only one international link, with Montenegro, the Podgorica–Shkodër railway, which has only ever been used for freight traffic, and whose last station in Albania is the Bajzë Rail Station. The condition of the line is very poor, with a lot of the damage caused by the 2019 earthquake. As such, a lot of the line is out of commission, and a journey cannot currently be completed between the two termini.

== History ==
Before 1947, Albania was the only country in Europe not to have a standard rail service, although some narrow (Decauville) gauge lines were built during World War I. In 1947, Albania's first standard gauge line was opened between Durrës and Peqin, measuring 44km. This was soon followed by the Durrës–Tirana line in 1948.

The railway system was extensively promoted by the government of Enver Hoxha, during which time the use of private motor transport was effectively prohibited. By 1987, 677km of track had been constructed, linking the main urban and industrial centres. Train transport was the main form of transport until the collapse of Communism in 1990.

After 1991, the railway network slowly began falling into disrepair. Since 1991, there has been a considerable increase in car ownership and bus usage. Whilst some of the country's secondary roads are still in a very poor condition, there have been other developments (such as the construction of a motorway between Tirana, Durrës, and other towns) which have taken much traffic away from the railways. Lack of government investment led to a slow decline for the railways, with stories of railway employees pitching in their own money for repair works.

As of 2015, some stations and rolling stock along the Durrës–Tiranë railway line was being renovated and coloured red and white.

== Timeline ==
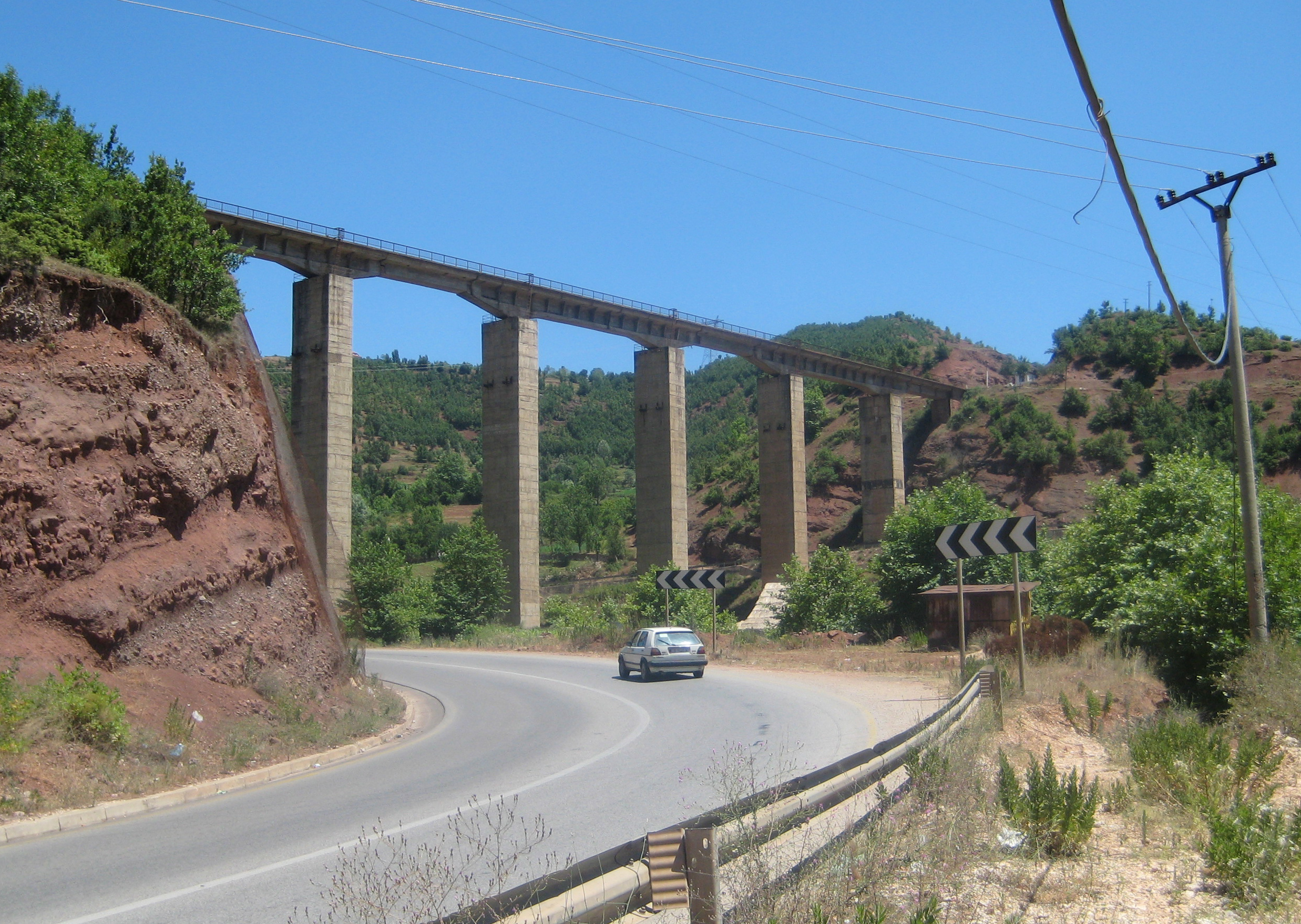
Bushtrica Railway Bridge south of Librazhd

- November 1947 - Opening of the first standard gauge railway line (from Durrës to Peqin).
- June 1957 - Introduction of the diesel-electric locomotives.
- July 1973 - Completion of the railway line from Elbasan to Prrenjas, the first Albanian line through the mountains.
- September 1986 - First international rail freight (to and from Montenegro, then part of Yugoslavia).
- 2000 - HSH ceases to be a state enterprise, becoming a limited company (although state owned).
- 2005 - Other rail operators allowed track access.
- August 2013 - The Tirana railway station is closed for the construction of the New Boulevard (Albanian: Bulevardi i Ri).
- 2019 - 29 November earthquake causes damage to parts of the network across the country, particularly on the Vorë - Han i Hotit line.
- 2020 - Most of the network closed
- 2021 - The only functioning passenger trains are on the Durrës - Elbasan line every Friday, Saturday, and Sunday. And on the Shkoder - Laç segment on the Vlore - Han i Hotit line (except this train only functions from 14.3.23 - 13.6.23 on every Monday and Tuesday).
- 2022 to Present - As rehabilitation works continue on the Durrës station, the Durrës - Elbasan line's terminus is moved, but services continue.

== Present day network ==
The HSH passenger system is virtually defunct. The last operating service, the Durrës - Elbasan line had its terminus moved, meaning it serves Durrës via the station of Plazh, around 6 kilometres (3.7 mi) away. This train only operates on Friday, Saturday and Sunday.

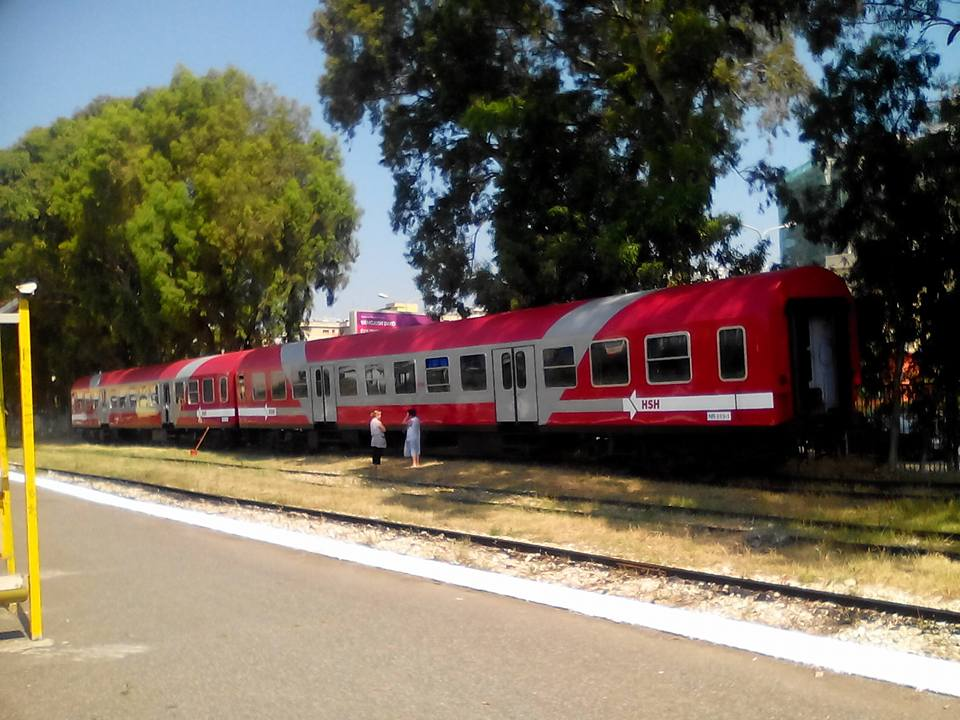
Rolling stock on Durres Railway Station

The Librazhd - Pogradec line, was closed for passenger traffic in 2012. The stored locomotives and wagons from Prrenjas were moved to Elbasan. Though the newly built Elbasan-Podgradec highway incorporated bridges over the railway track, thus leaving open the possibility of their eventual reopening, it is unlikely that services to Elbasan and beyond will resume.

Rehabilitation of the Fier - Vlorë mainline is currently being carried out by Albrail for freight purposes, a private company which bought the rights to that track from HSH. Immediately south of Fier a number of short spurs to industrial areas have been re-laid.

In 2019, 5 trains per day ran on the network. 1 train Kashar - Elbasan, 2 trains Durres - Shkoder and 2 trains Durres - Elbasan. In the spring of 2022, the stretch between Shkodër and Laç of the original Shkodër–Vorë railway was served once weekly on Tuesday.

== Rehabilitation works ==
=== Tirana - Durrës ===
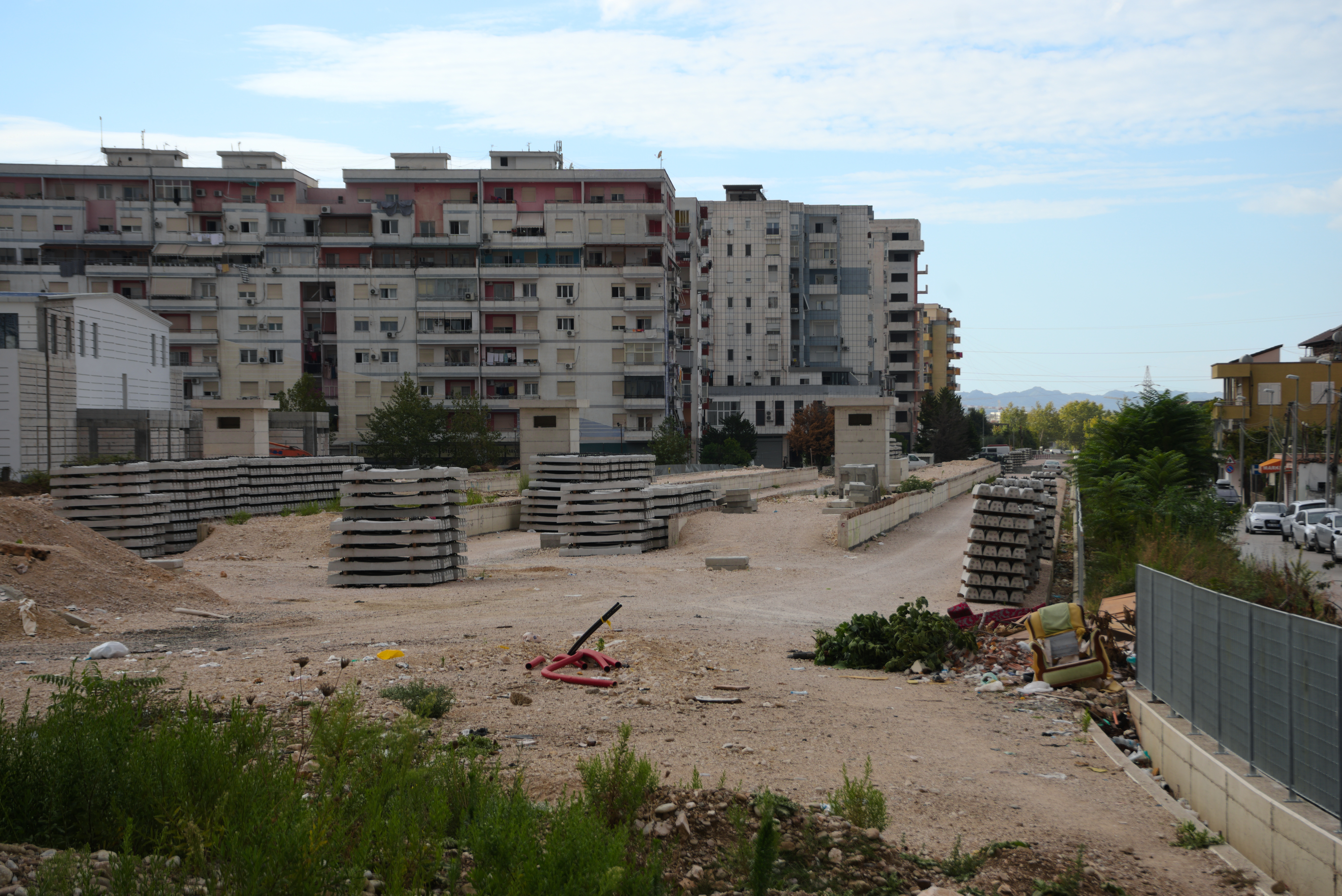
Overview of the new terminus in Tirana, Sept 2024

As of September 2023, the Tirana - Durrës line is the only one with ongoing rehabilitation works. The rehabilitation, funded by a loan of €35.9 million from the European Bank for Reconstruction and Development and a €35.5 million grant from the Western Balkans Investment Fund, includes the complete overhaul of around 40km of track, including a new section to Tirana International Airport Nënë Tereza, as well as the construction of new stations all across the line. Due to an initial delay with the construction of the various bridges included in the project, it was expected to be finished in March 2024. The project has now once again been pushed back. It is now expected to finish construction in 2026.

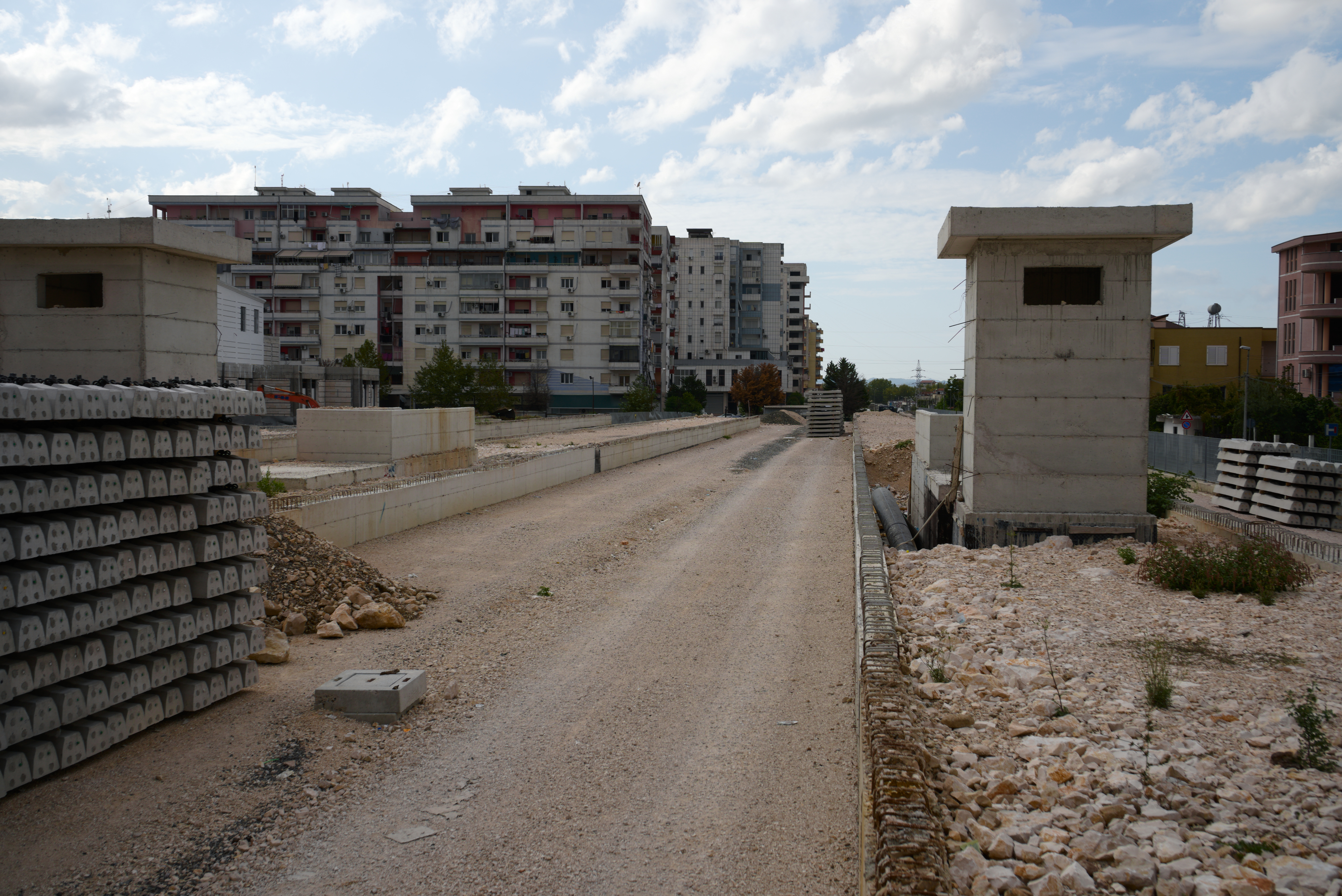
View from the platform of the new terminus in Tirana, Sept 2024

The trains are expected to run at around 100 km/h (62 mph) to 80 km/h (50 mph) between Tirana PTT, Durrës, and the airport, with slower speeds between Tirana PTT and the stations located closer to the city center. Some government officials have claimed that the trains will be electrified, but official sources do not sufficiently confirm this. The Tirana - Durrës leg is expected to take 22 minutes, and the Tirana - Rinas Airport leg is expected to take 12 minutes.

=== Vorë - Hani i Hotit ===
As of September 2023, the Vorë - Han i Hotit line, sometimes known as the Shkodër–Vorë railway, is in the final stages of preparation before construction begins. The project is expected to follow the same geography as the currently existing line. Similarly to the Tirana - Durrës line, the trains are expected to reach a maximum speed of 120 km/h (75 mph), however, the track will not be electrified.

== Future ==
=== Durrës - Rrogozhinë - Elbasan - Pogradec line ===
On 9 October 2018, the Feasibility Study for rehabilitation of the Durrës - Rrogozhinë - Elbasan - Pogradec railway line was presented, funded by European Commission funds, made available through the Western Balkans Investment Instrument. A pre-feasibility assessment was completed for the 151 km (94 mi) Durrës to Pogradec line. The focus was on the 72 km (45 mi) line between Durrës, Rrogozhinë, and Elbasan.

The Durrës - Rrogozhinë segment was rated the highest priority for rehabilitation. The rehabilitation cost is estimated at EUR 52 million which will meet European Network design standards at speeds of 100 km/h (62 mph) and axle load of 22.5 tons. Travel time will be reduced from 60 min to 32 min. The flow along this segment is expected to reach 330,000 passengers and 1,100,000 tons of goods by 2047. Estimated value in time saving for users of the Albanian transport system will be 0.65 million euros for travelers and 15.3 million euros for freight transport. Additional savings from the reduction in the cost of operating vehicles in road transport are estimated at EUR 0.5 million for travelers and EUR 8.7 million for freight transport.

=== Durrës–Pristina line ===
Albania and Kosovo signed a memorandum of understanding (MoU) paving the way for the construction of a railway line that will link the Adriatic port of Durrës to Pristina, the capital of Kosovo.

On 20 June 2022, both governments signed another agreement to build the railway track connecting Durrës and Pristina. The memorandum covered the feasibility study for the project that was expected to cost some €1.98 million. Of this total, Albania would contribute €1 million and Kosovo €980,000. The feasibility study would take 14 months. In January 2024, the preliminary results of the feasibility study were released. The line was expected to mostly follow the Vorë–Hani i Hotit railway, up until Shkodër or another point, where it will branch off, reaching Gjakovë and continuing towards Pristina.

The consortium selected to conduct the feasibility study which would decide the precise path of the line had until the end of 2024 to publish their results. L50,000,000 were allocated in the Albanian government's 2024 budget for this study. The project was expected to cost 700,000,000 United States dollars in total.

In May 2026, the Albanian Government approved its transport strategy until 2030, with the Durrës–Pristina line as a priority. It was scheduled to cost Albania €750 million and was not expected to be completed in 2030.

=== Pogradec–Krystallopigi line ===
In 2021, it was announced that a railway linking Albania and Greece was entering planning stages. The line, with a length of around 130 km (81 mi) of new track, connect between the two countries through Florina-Krystallopigi-Pogradec. The line is planned to be single-track and electrified.

=== Pan-European Corridor VIII ===
Albania, Bulgaria and North Macedonia have signed on 19 October 2021 an agreement to complete Pan-European Corridor VIII. The Durres - Pogradec line will be extended by 3 km (1.9 mi) to Lin where the tracks will continue into North Macedonia. North Macedonia is currently seeking funding for the rail link.

== Statistics ==
Usage of the railway network of Albania is declining year by year.

Albania Railways annual statistics
		1950	1965	1970	1975	1980	1985	1989	1993	1994	1995	1996	1997	1998	1999	2000	2001	2002	2003	2004	2005	2006	2007	2008	2009	2010	2011	2012	2013
Passengers	in thousands								3,961	4,022	3,739	3,389	1,820	2,269	2,270	2,381	2,676	2,270	2,070	1,758	1,440	1,659	1,091	822	645	430	453	448	329
Passengers	in millions pass.-km								223	215	197	168	95	116	121	125	138	123	105	89	73	80	51	41	32	19	18	16	12
Freight	in thousands tonnes								539	522	574	521	284	305	361	412	258	340	520	417	404	450	399	355	343	403	317	142	151
Freight	in millions ton.-km								54	53	53	42	23	25	27	28	19	21	31	32	26	36	53	52	46	66	50	25	23
Network length	in kilometres	115	143	193	272	319	421	447																					

== Rail links to adjacent countries ==
All neighbouring railways share the same gauge.

- Montenegro - freight only
- Greece - planned
- North Macedonia - no connection, planned
- Kosovo - planned

== See also ==
- Hekurudha Shqiptare
- Transport in Albania
