= Shkodër railway station =

Railway station in Shkodër County, Albania

Shkodër railway station Stacioni hekurudhor i Shkodrës
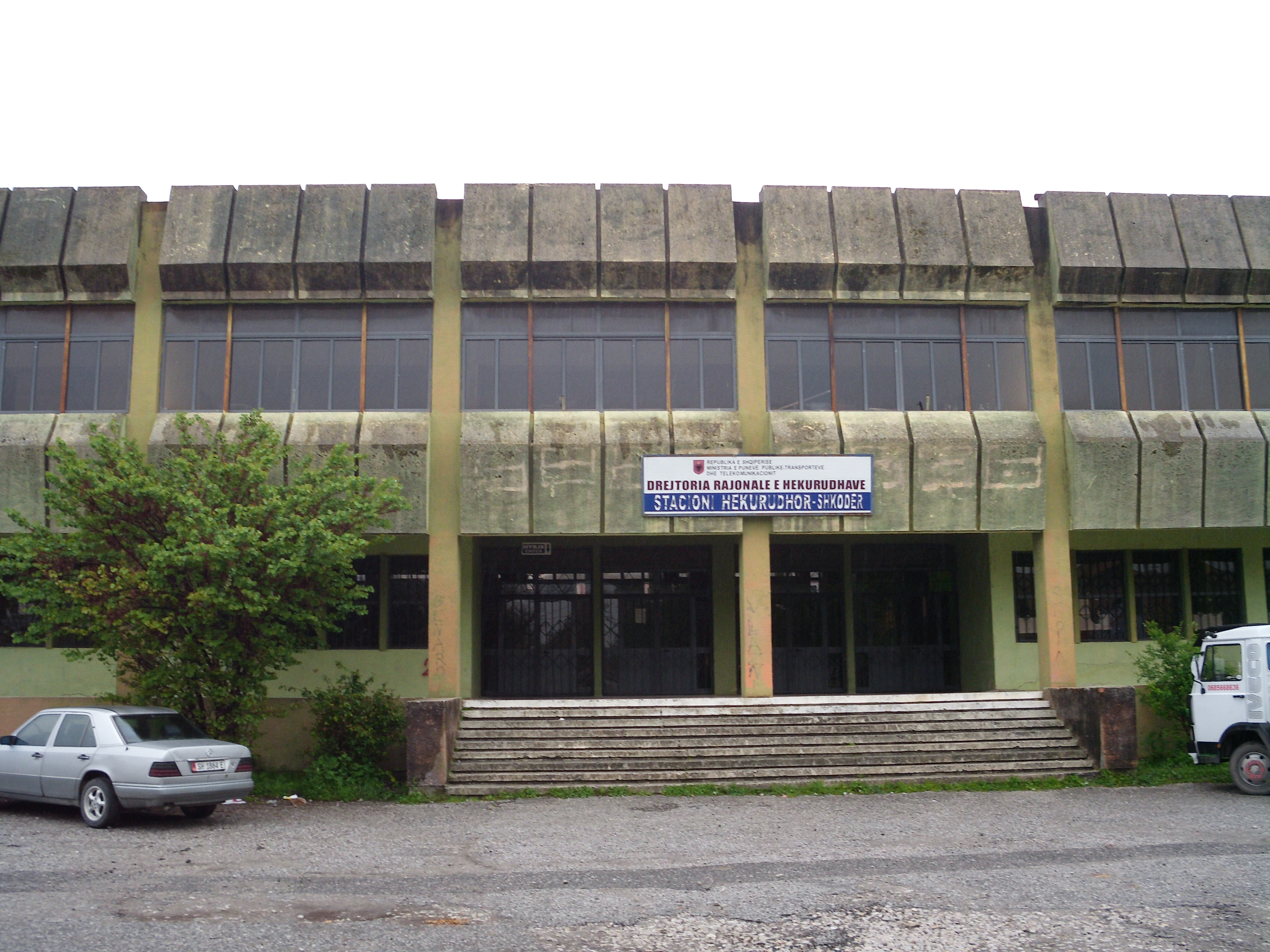
- Shkoder station in 2014

General information
- Location: Shkodër; Shkodër County; Albania
- Coordinates: 42.0612°N 19.5272°E
- System: Terminal railway station
- Operator: Hekurudha Shqiptare
- Lines: Shkodër–Vorë railway Podgorica–Shkodër railway
- Platforms: 1

History
- Opened: 11 November 1981
Location
- Location within Albania Location within Europe

Shkodër railway station (Albanian: Stacioni hekurudhor i Shkodrës) is the main railway station serving the city of Shkodër in Shkodër County in Northern Albania. It is the northernmost passenger station in Albania.

Shkodër was first reached by rail when a 34 km long extension from Lezhë was completed in 1981 using raw materials imported from Morocco. Passenger services began on 25 January 1982. In 1985, a long-anticipated connection with the international railway network was affected with a further extension (opened to regular traffic in 1986) from Shkodër to Tuzi in Montenegro via Bajzë and Han i Hotit, providing Albania with its only international railway link, though it has never carried passengers.

In the early 1990s, trains ran twice daily between Shkodër and Durrës, though by 2015–16, this had been reduced to one train each way.

In 2012, a train that departed from Shkodër caught fire, but there were no fatalities or injured persons. Shkodër railway station will close if there is no investment. As of 2/5/2020 the station seems to be closed on Google Maps.

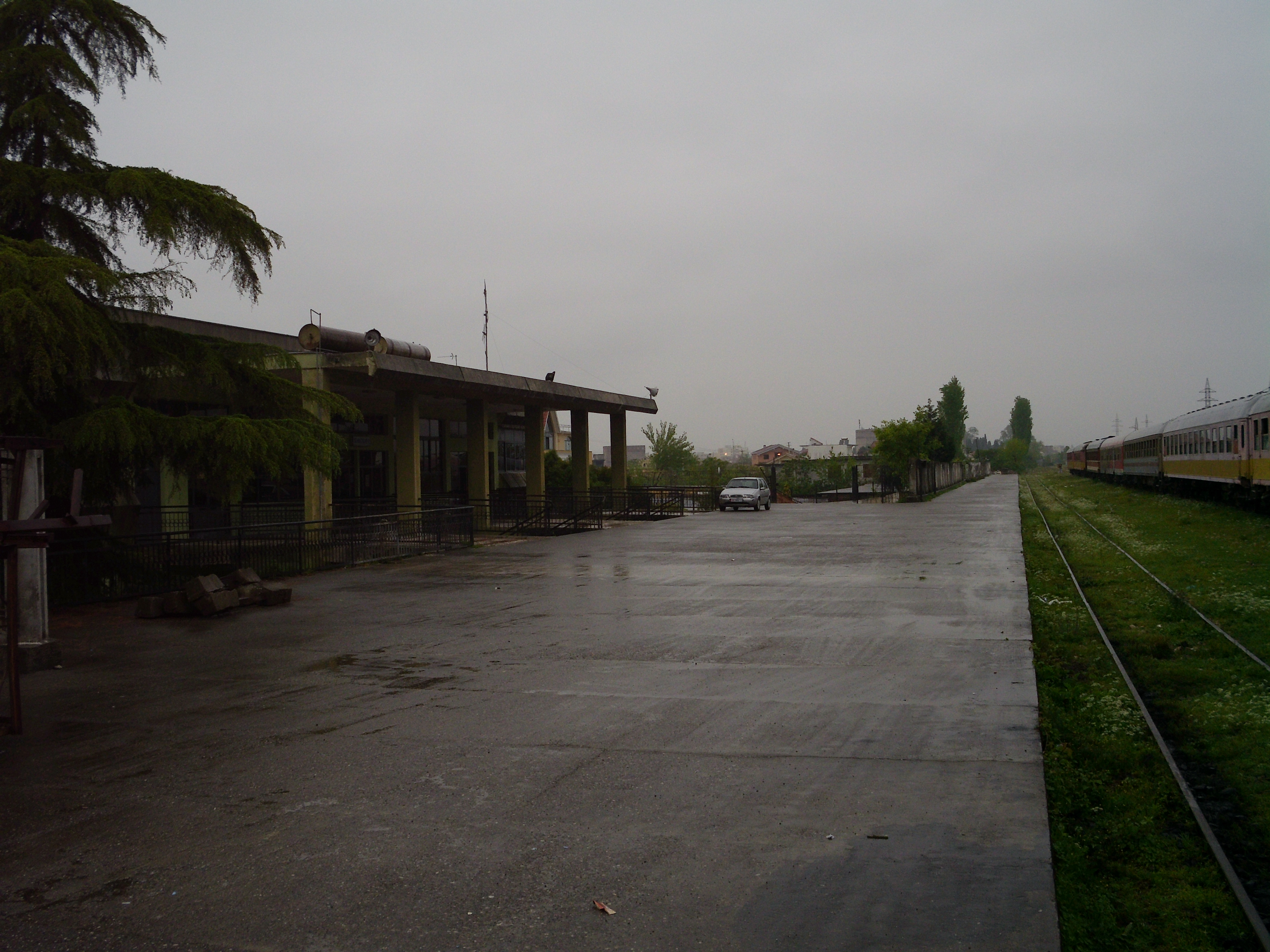
Shkodër station platform

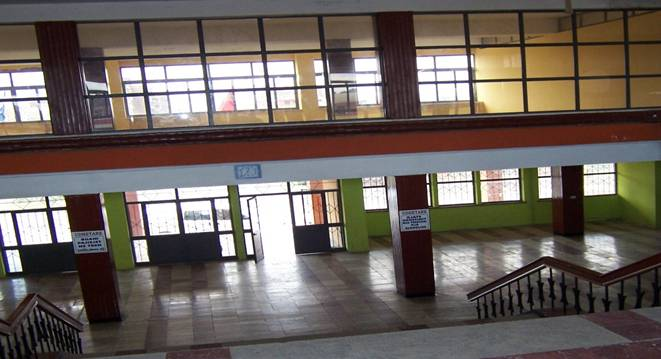
Station interior

== See also ==
- List of railway stations in Albania
- Rail transport in Albania
- History of rail transport in Albania
- Transport in Albania
- Shkodër–Vorë railway
- Podgorica–Shkodër railway
