= Tole Berishaj =

Albanian costume designer (born 1927)

- Born: Tole Lekë Elezaj; 22 February 1927 (age 99); Bajzë, Albania
- Occupation: Costume designer
- Known for: The last designer of Xhubleta

Tole Lekë Berishaj (born 22 February 1927) is an Albanian-born costume designer, known as the last woman to knit Xhubleta.

== Life and career ==
Berishaj was born in Bajzë on 22 February 1927. At a very young age she liked embroideries and was always busy with them. She married in Grude-Berishaj and there she started practicing her craft as an artisan sewing folk costumes when one of them is Xhubleta, which is one of the traditional clothes not only in the northern province but in all of Albania.

After a few years she traveled to Tuzi in Montenegro from where she still lives today. She has participated in many events and competitions for the creation of clothing, where she won as the oldest Albanian woman who still continues to knit. Also she opened a workshop for the production of national clothing, but since five years she has had the help of her granddaughter Amantia, from where she wants to bequeath to her the only one, the weaving craft of Xhubleta. She has spent part of her life in the US making a profit in the market for selling Xhubleta from foreigners. For her work and merits as the last designer of traditional costumes at an advanced age, she has been honored with the title Honor of Albania, Honor of Kosovo and Order of the Republic of Montenegro.
