= Cave of Saint Blaise =

Cave in Laç, Albania

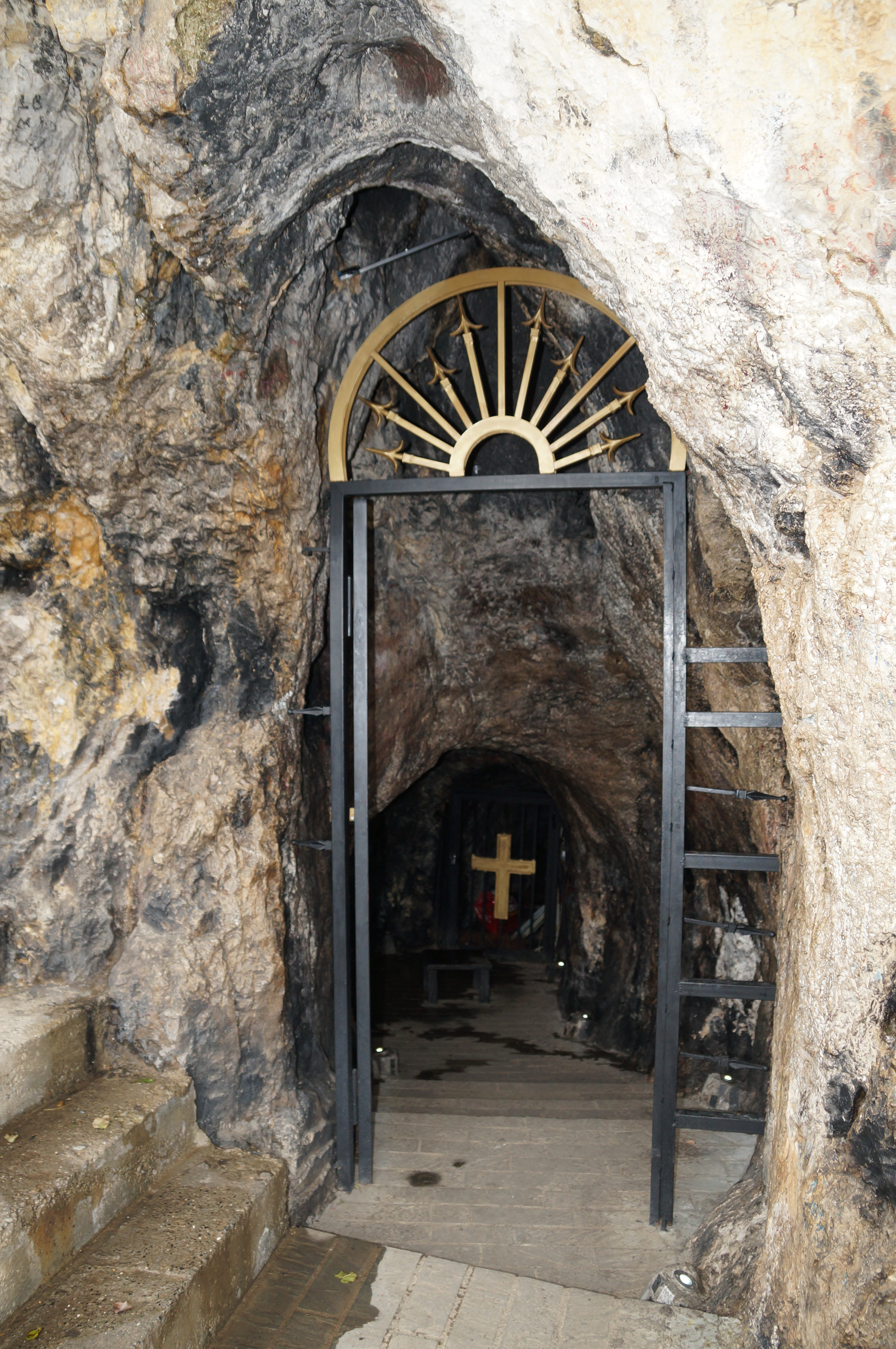
Shën Vlashi Cave, Laç

The Cave of Saint Blaise (Albanian: Shpella e Shën Vlashit) is a small cave in Laç, Albania. It is thought to have been the place where Saint Blaise lived, and remains a popular pilgrimage site.

According to Robert Elsie, this Saint Blaise is not to be confused with Saint Blaise of Armenia, but is a local person, who was tortured in Durrës and died in Ragusa.

He is regarded as a continuation of the pre-Christian deity Veles, who guarded the flocks of the early Slavs. In Yaroslavl, the first church built on the site of Veles's pagan shrine was dedicated to St Blaise, for the latter's name was similar to Veles and he was likewise considered a heavenly patron of shepherds.

The cave is close the Saint Anthony Church, dedicated to Saint Anthony of Padua and built in 1556.
