= Shkodër–Vorë railway =

Railway between Shkodër and Vorë in Albania

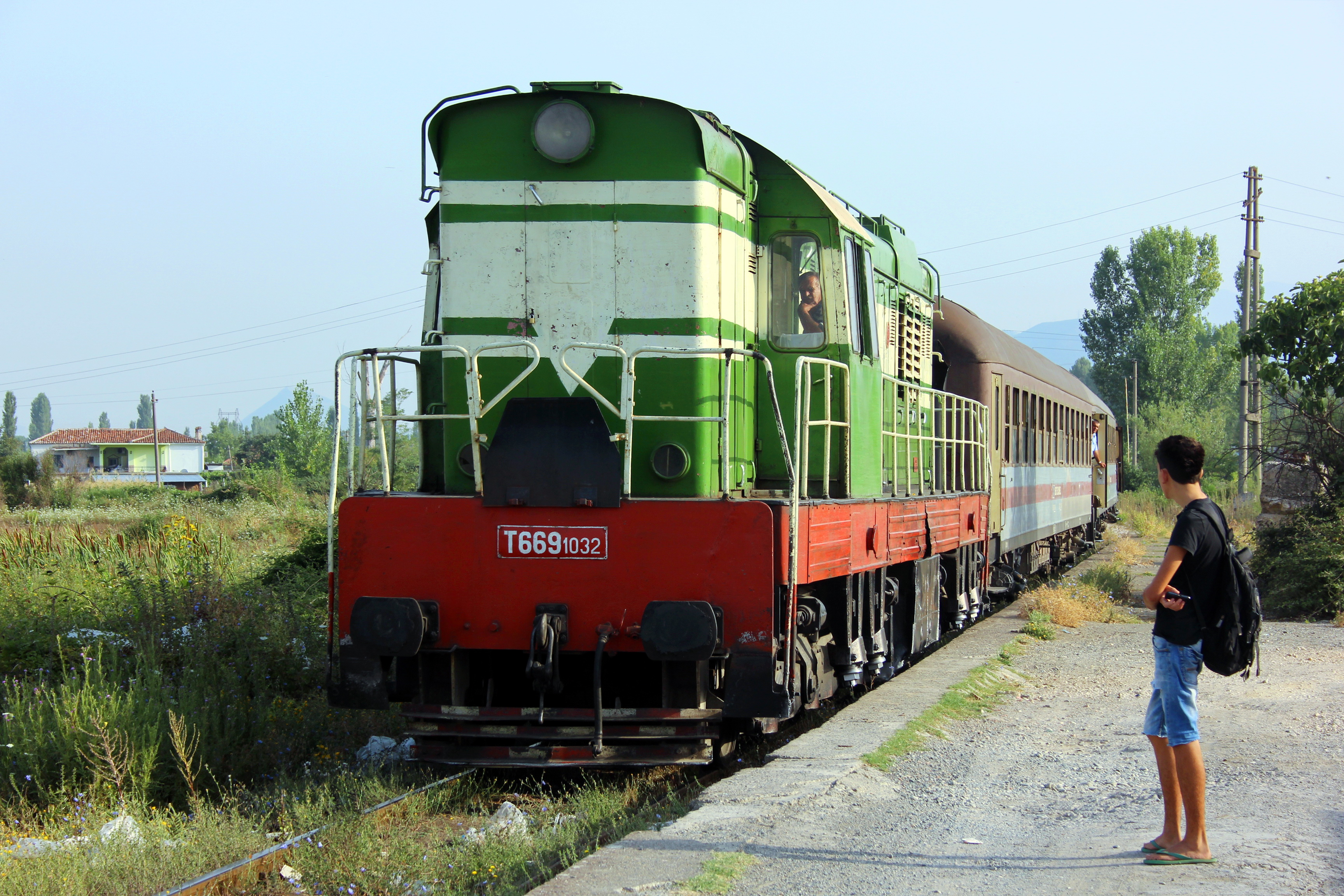
- Train at Laç station

Overview
- Stations: 11

Service
- Operator(s): Hekurudha Shqiptare

Technical
- Line length: 64.3 mi (103.5 km)
- Track gauge: 1,435 mm (4 ft 8 1/2 in) standard gauge

The Shkodër–Vorë railway is a railway between Shkodër and Vorë in Albania.

The line connected to the Podgorica–Shkodër railway in Shkodër, the uncompleted Milot–Klos railway in Milot and the Durrës–Tiranë railway in Vorë.

== Overview ==
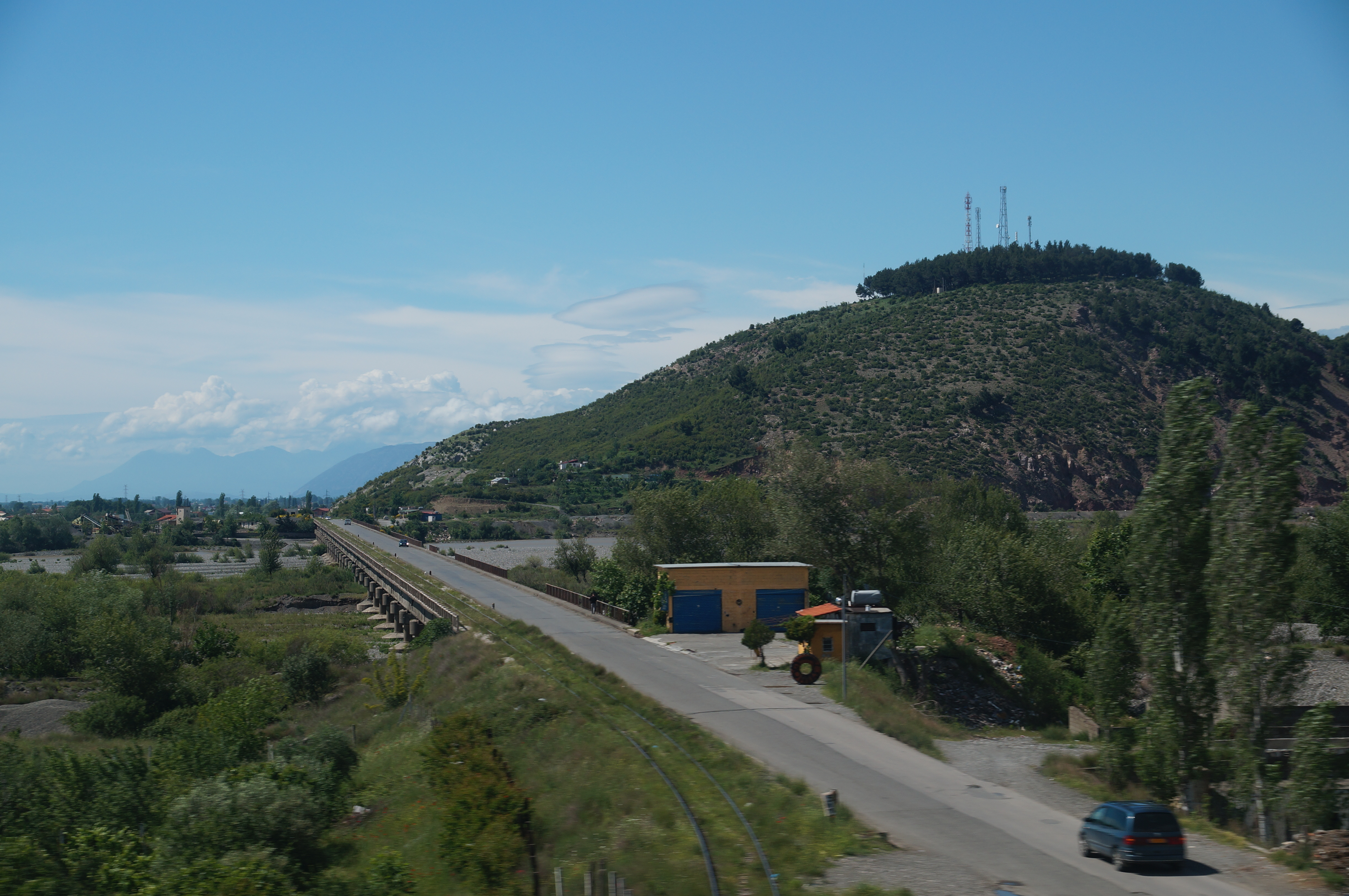
Joint car and railroad bridge over the river Mat in Milot (2019)

The Shkodër–Vorë railway is a 103.6 kilometre-long standard gauge railway. Like other railways throughout Albania, the railway is not electrified.

There is a projected railway that is slated to operate from Vorë to the Tirana International Airport Nënë Tereza. However, the project has yet to commence construction.

== History ==
The 28 kilometre rail line between Vorë and Laç was completed between 1962 and 1963 with the help of volunteers. Raw materials were imported from Morocco, which were then hauled by locomotives from Durrës to Laç. The line officially opened on 7 May 1963.

The 20 kilometre rail line between Laç and Lezhë was completed between 1980 and 1981. The line officially opened in April 1981.

The 34 kilometre rail line between Lezhë and Shkodër was completed between 1981 and 1982. The line officially opened on 11 November 1981, and began passenger services on 25 January 1982.

== Stations ==
Station	Image	Opened	Additional information
Shkodër		1981	5:40 AM leaves from Shkodër heading south
Mjedë		1981	
Baqël		1981	
Lezhë		1981	
Milot		1981	
Laç		1963	
Gjonëm		1963	
Mamurras		1963	
Ishëm		1963	
Budullë		1963	
Vorë		1949	

== See also ==
- Hekurudha Shqiptare (Albanian Railways)
- Rail transport in Albania
- History of rail transport in Albania
- Transport in Albania
