= Podgorica–Shkodër railway =

Overview
- Owner: ŽICG, HSH
- Termini: Podgorica; Shkodër
- Stations: 3

Service
- Operator(s): ŽPCG, HSH

History
- Opened: 1986

Technical
- Line length: 63.5 km (39 mi)
- Number of tracks: 1
- Track gauge: 1,435 mm (4 ft 8 1/2 in) standard gauge
- Old gauge: Narrow gauge
- Electrification: no
- Operating speed: ~ 70 km/h (43 mph)

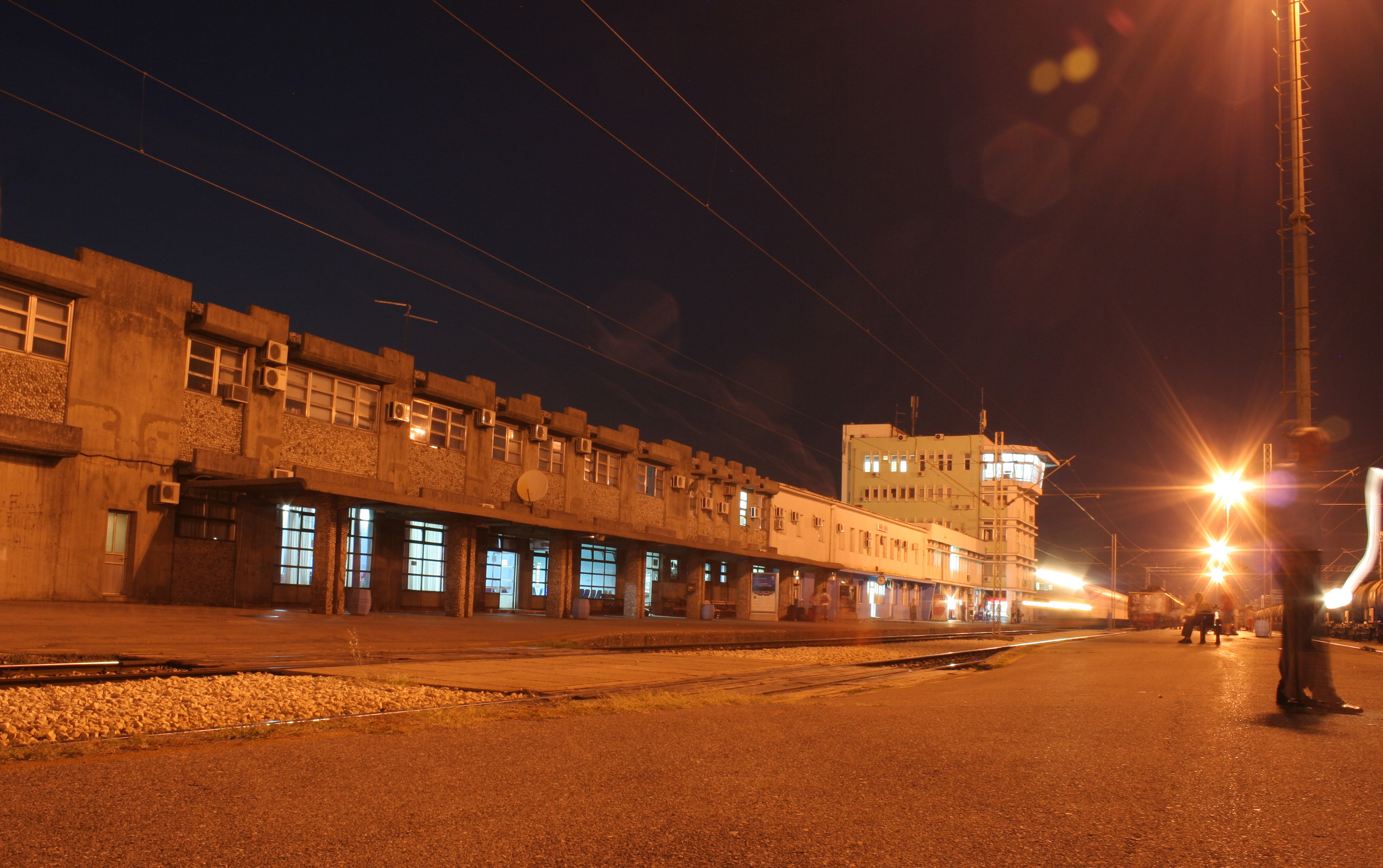
Podgorica train station, located on the Podgorica–Shkodër railway

The Podgorica–Shkodër railway is a railway connecting Albania and Montenegro, used for freight-purposes only. It is Albania's only international rail link. Although initially built between 1984 and 1985, it fell into disuse in 1991 and later fully reopened in 2003.

The rail infrastructure is operated by Montenegrin ŽICG on Montenegrin territory and Hekurudha Shqiptare (Albanian Railways) on Albanian territory. Nevertheless, train services are usually operated by Montenegrin operator ŽPCG between Podgorica and the Albanian Bajzë station and by Hekurudha Shqiptare between Bajzë and Shkodër only.

The line connects to Belgrade–Bar railway and Nikšić–Podgorica railway in Podgorica and Shkodër–Vorë railway in Shkodër.

== Overview ==
Podgorica–Shkodër is a 63.5 km (39 mi) long standard gauge railway, of which 34 km (21 mi) runs through Albania and the remaining 29.5 km (18 mi) through Montenegro. Like other railways throughout Albania, the railway is not electrified. The line's last station in Albania is the Bajzë Rail Station.

== History ==
Built between 1984 and 1985, the Podgorica–Shkodër freight line was the first international railway of Albania. It began operations on 11 January 1985 with regular traffic beginning 6 August 1986. The line fell into disuse in 1991 due to trade sanctions in Yugoslavia. The Bajzë-Shkodër line (with the exception of Hani i Hotit) was reopened for use in February 1996. A reopening of the Hani i Hotit-Bajzë line was scheduled for 15 November 1996 but was cancelled. The track was later badly damaged due to civil unrest in 1997.

In April 2002, reconstruction of the line between the Montenegrin border at Hani i Hotit and Bajzë were completed. By March 2003, the line between Bajzë and Shkodër was completed with 365 million lek funded by the Albanian government. A ceremony held on 6 March 2003 officially marked the opening of the Bajzë–Shkodër. As a sign of mutual cooperation, then-Albanian Prime Minister Fatos Nano and a then-Montenegrin Deputy Prime Minister travelled to Tuzi in Montenegro on a special train operating on this line.

== Future plans ==
Long-term plans currently exist for the establishment and operation of passenger service on this railway.

There are other plans involving the construction of a new high-speed rail line between Podgorica and Shkodër.

== See also ==
- Hekurudha Shqiptare (Albanian Railways)
- Railways of Montenegro
- Rail transport in Albania
- Rail transport in Montenegro
- Transport in Albania
- Transport in Montenegro
