= Lezhë railway station =

Railway station in Lezhë, Albania

Lezhë railway station Stacioni hekurudhor i Lezhës
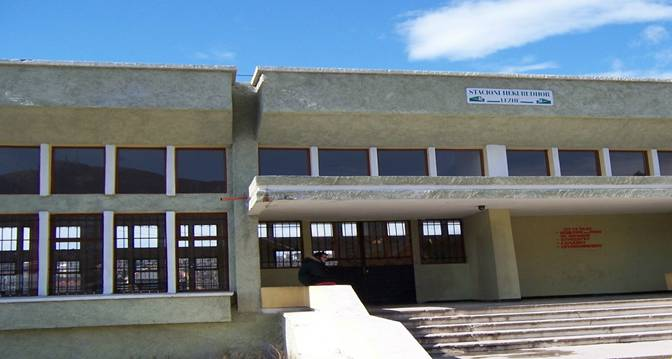
- The station in 2010

General information
- Location: Lezhë; Lezhë County; Albania
- Coordinates: 41.7805°N 19.6388°E
- System: Hekurudha Shqiptare
- Line: Shkodër-Vorë railway
- Platforms: 1

History
- Opened: April 1981
Location
- Location within Albania

Lezhë railway station (Albanian: Stacioni hekurudhor i Lezhës) is a railway station serving the city of Lezhë in Northern Albania.

The line was opened in 1981. It was a terminal station until the extension to Shkodër was completed the following year. Like most other railway stations in Albania, Lezhë has become underused since the rise in private car ownership following the end of the communist regime in the 1990s.

Lezhë is one of the larger, more substantial stations on the line, and formerly had a number of facilities; it once had a bar, which was privatised in 1993.

In 2013, the Municipality of Lezhë announced a plan to build a large new business park in the city, which would include a new, improved freight facility for the station, though it is unclear whether this plan will be carried out.

== See also ==
- List of railway stations in Albania
- Rail transport in Albania
- History of rail transport in Albania
- Transport in Albania
- Shkodër–Vorë railway
