= Laç railway station =

Railway station in Laç, Albania

Laç railway station Stacioni hekurudhor i Laçit
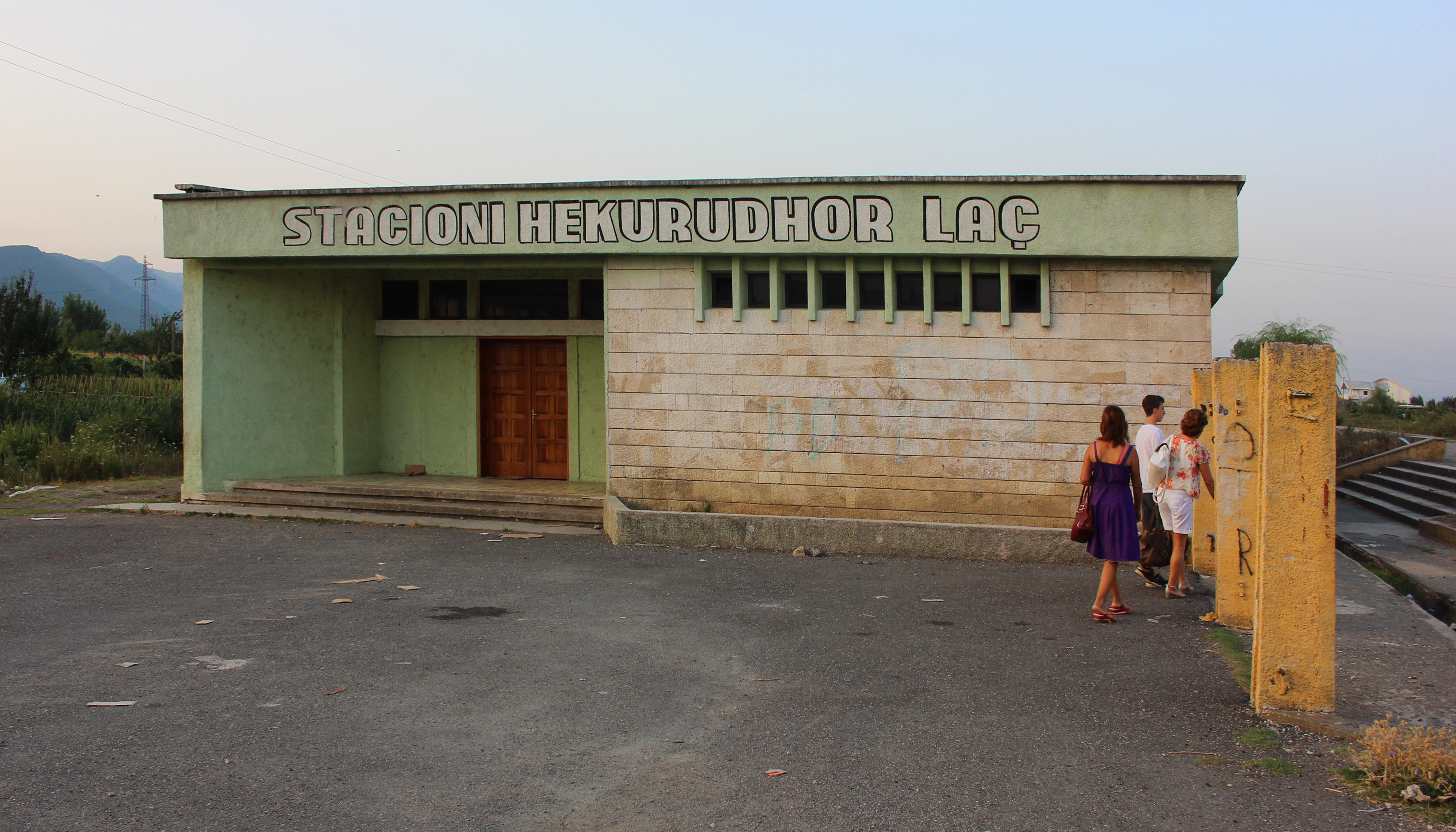
- The station in 2012

General information
- Location: Laç; Lezhe County; Albania
- Coordinates: 41.6379°N 19.7008°E
- System: Hekurudha Shqiptare
- Line: Shkodër-Vorë railway
- Platforms: 1

History
- Opened: 7 May 1963
Location
- Location within Albania

Lac railway station (Albanian: Stacioni hekurudhor i Laçit) is a railway station serving the town of Laç in Lezhe County in Northern Albania.

The station was opened in 1963 and remained the terminus of a line from Vore until a further extension to Lezhë was completed in 1981.

The station was once (along with Fier) a vital hub for transporting goods like ores and ammonium nitrate as well as passengers. In 1991, the International Fertilizer Development Center reported that 80-90% of fertiliser produced in Laç was transported by rail from the station, but that whilst there were sufficient wagons and optimistic journey times, the storage facilities at the station were inadequate.

== See also ==
- List of railway stations in Albania
- Rail transport in Albania
- History of rail transport in Albania
- Transport in Albania
- Shkodër–Vorë railway
