= Bajzë railway station =

Railway station in Bajzë, Albania

Bajzë railway station Stacioni Hekurudhor i Bajzë
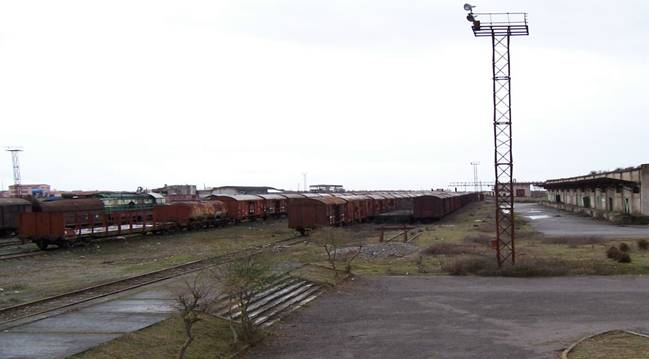

General information
- Location: Bajzë; Albania
- Coordinates: 42°16′41″N 19°25′22″E
- Line: Podgorica – Bajzë - Shkodër

History
- Opened: 1985
Location
- Location within Albania Location within Europe

The Bajzë Rail Station (Albanian: Stacioni Hekurudhor i Bajzë) is a railway station located in Bajzë, Albania. It is operated by Hekurudha Shqiptare (Albanian Railways) and part of Montenegrin-Albanian cross-border freight line between Podgorica, capital of Montengero, and Shkodër, Albania. Two freight trains pass daily through the station, hauling over 10,000 tonnes of commodities monthly. Long-term plans exist to establish and operate international passenger trains between Albania and Montenegro via Bajzë. The vast majority of Albanian entrepreneurs import their goods through the railway line from all over Europe, as transport through train is about 50% cheaper than road transport. Cleaning of toxic chemicals, which had been dumped during 1991–1992, finished in 2009.

== History ==
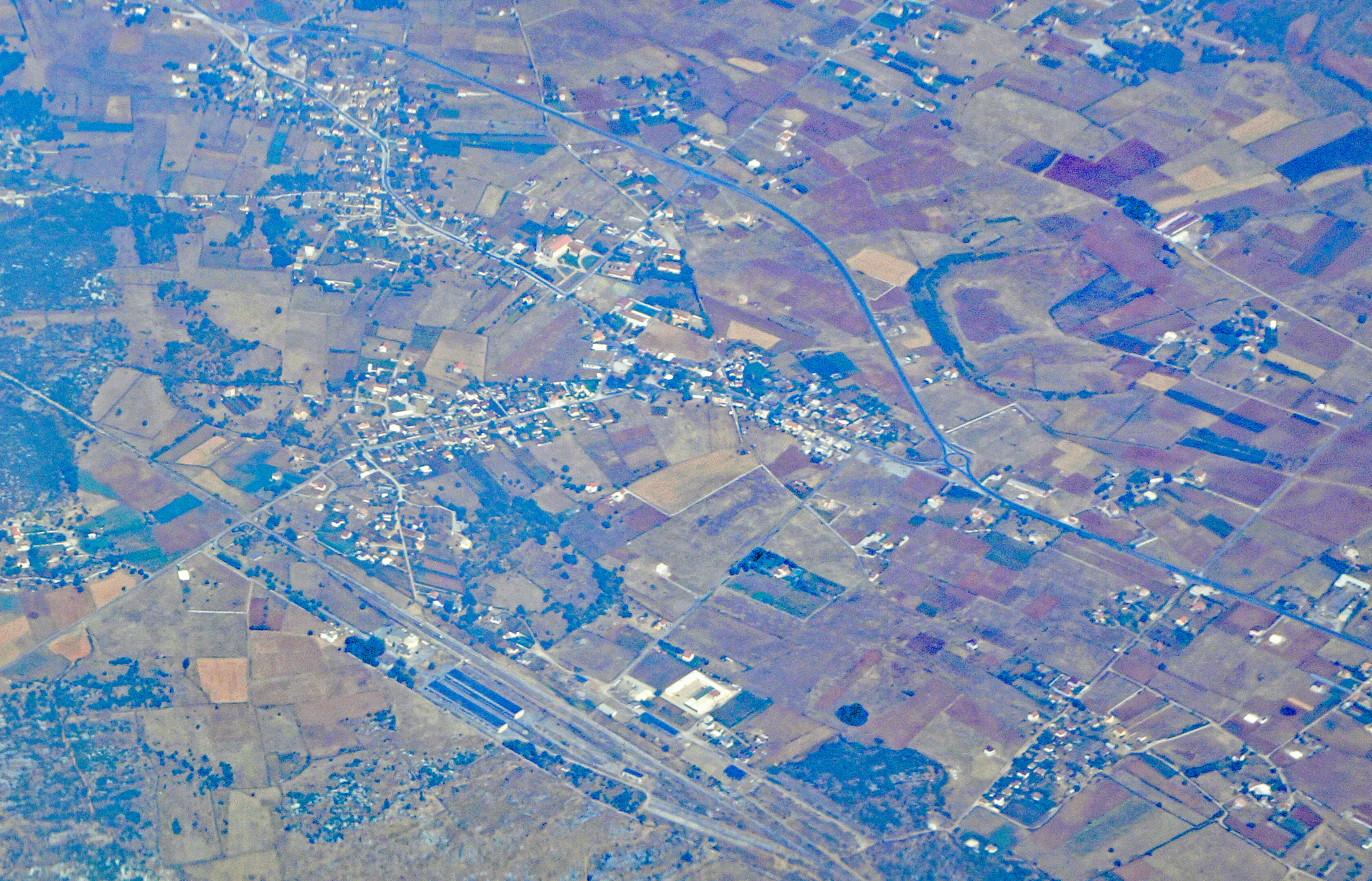
Aerial photograph of Bajzë with the station in the bottom part of the photograph.

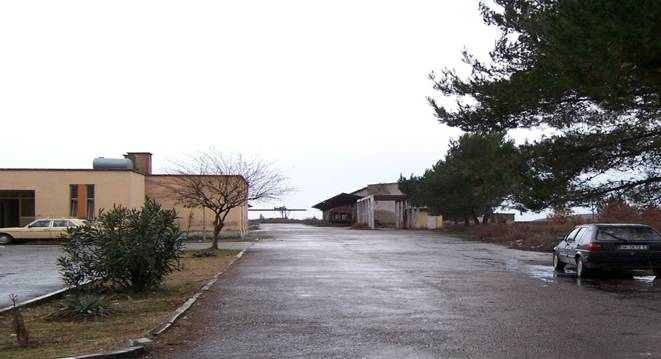
Bajzë railway station.

The Shkodër-Podgorica freight line was built between 1984 and 1985. It began operations on 11 January 1985 with regular traffic beginning 6 August 1986. The line fell into disuse in 1991 due to trade sanctions of Yugoslavia. The Bajzë-Shkodër line (with the exception of Han i Hotit) gradually reopened beginning in 1992, officially reopening in February 1996. A reopening of the Han i Hotit-Bajzë line was scheduled for 15 November 1996 but was cancelled. The track was later badly damaged due to civil unrest in 1997.

In April 2002, reconstruction of the line between the Montenegrin border at Han i Hotit and Bajzë was completed. Before it was connected with the rest of the Albanian railway network, the Hani i Hotit-Bajzë line had transported a total of 4,800 tonnes of commodities. By March 2003, the line between Bajzë and Shkodër was completed with 365 million lek funded by the Albanian government. A ceremony held on 6 March 2003 officially marked the opening of the Bajzë - Shkodër. As a sign of mutual cooperation, then Albanian Prime Minister Fatos Nano and a then Montenegrin Deputy Prime Minister traveled to Tuzi in Montenegro on a special train operating on this line.

=== Poison Chemical Dumping ===
In the beginning of the 1990s, a range of expired pesticides, industrial chemicals and various other materials were deposited in the warehouse of the rail station. Between 1991 and 1992, German company Schmidt-Cretan temporarily imported and stowed 480 tonnes of dangerous chemicals in Bajzë. Of these chemicals, the most dangerous were toxaphene and phenylmercury acetate, both banned in the European Union since 1983. Importing was halted when the Albanian government noticed that the pesticides were outdated. Following complaints, the German authorities agreed to return the chemicals to Germany. In the meantime, however, local Albanians had emptied many containers in order to use them for household purposes. Much of the contents were emptied directly into the ground, eventually dispersing into Lake Shkodër. It was later reported that many cattle and sheep from the vicinity had died after the incident. Moreover, in subsequent years, fishermen from Lake Shkodër have reported a mass death of fish in the lake.

Despite expressing concern, public health institutions have not made any detailed analysis of the situation of pollution in the region. In recent years, Mayor Gjovalin Veshtaj reported an increase in cases of people suffering with cancer in the surrounding area for many years where these pesticides were located, relating this factor to their presence. Locals also associate the presence of pesticides with chronic headaches and birth defects.

Foods imported via Bajzë were at risk of being contaminated from the toxic waste. Wind also accounted for much of the spread of contamination, which could have carried contaminants as far as 50 kilometres from the station, affecting crops, livestock and the local population.

There was approximately 200-250 tonnes of toxic waste located at the rail station facilities. However, a preliminary investigation led by the United Nations Development Programme (UNDP) revealed that the toxic waste was in fact composed of 200 tonnes of leather rags and 80 tonnes of sodium hexafluorosilicate (Na_{2}SiF_{6}). The presence of sodium hexafluorosilicate was reported to be due to toxic waste dumping performed by the chemical-metallurgical plant located in Elbasan.

The UNDP is currently in charge of a US$2.2 million programme aimed at clearing the toxic waste, with funding from the Albanian and Dutch governments. Cleanup efforts were scheduled to occur between September 2007 and March 2010. As of September 2009, the rail station had been cleared of all remaining toxic waste.

== See also ==
- List of railway stations in Albania
- Rail transport in Albania
