= Çorape =

Albanian word for socks

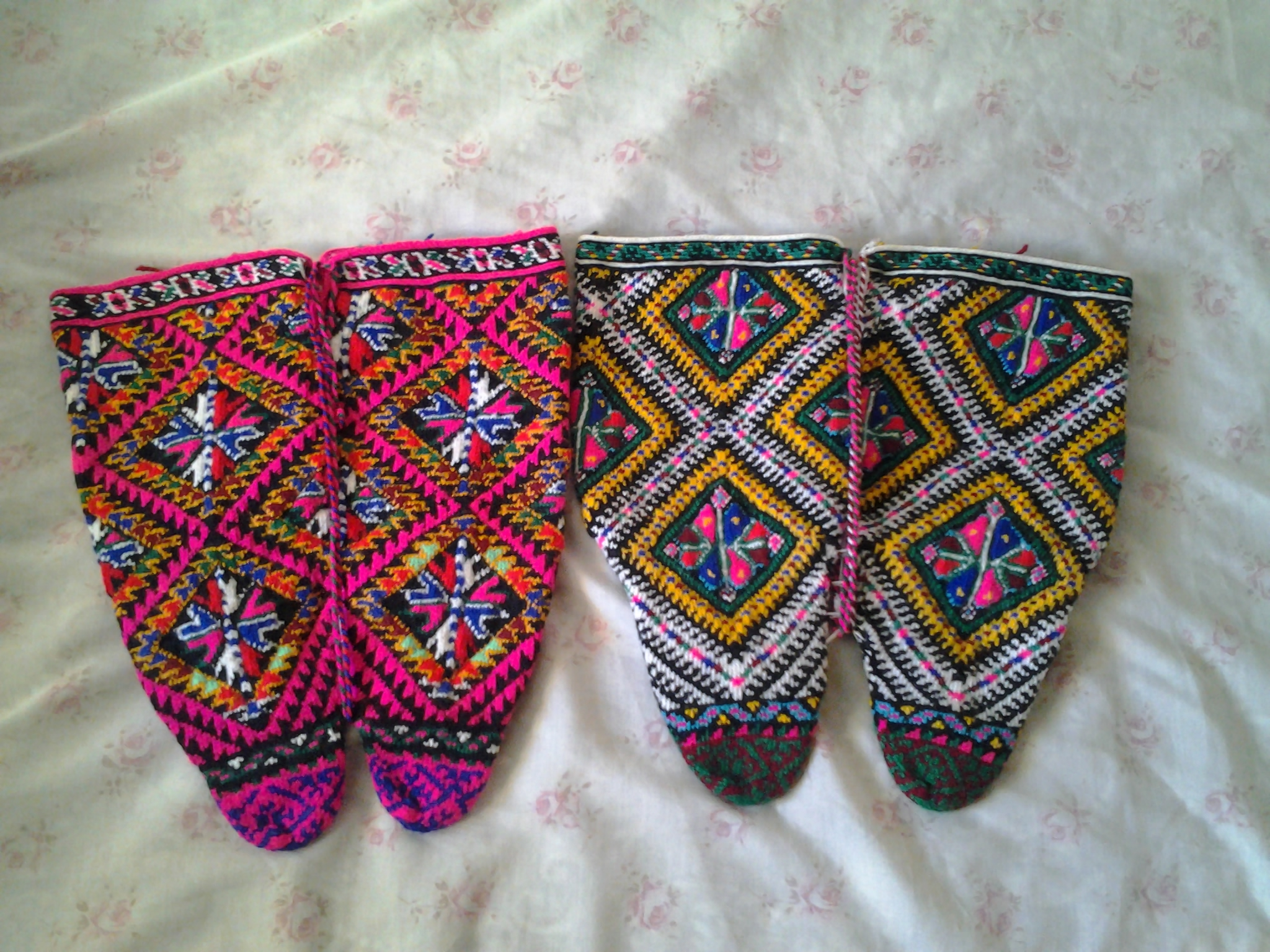
Çorape from Kukes

Çorape is the Albanian word for socks. The traditional çorape, which is part of the traditional clothing are worked either in wool or cotton, and have many motifs and colors, sometimes including very thin metal threads.

The çorape worn in the region of Rugova are usually white, but during the Ottoman presence they were most likely red. They were similar to those used in Montenegro for the way they would look on the inside and for the way they would be tied.
