= Traditional Albanian clothing =

The traditional Albanian clothing (Albanian: Veshjet Tradicionale Shqiptare; Veshjet Kombëtare; Veshjet Popullore or Kostumet Kombëtare) includes more than 500 different varieties of clothing in all Albania and the Albanian-speaking territories and communities (including the Arbëreshë in Italy, Arvanites in Greece and Arbanasi in Croatia). Albania's recorded history of clothing goes back to classical times. It is one of the factors that has differentiated this nation from other European countries, dating back to the Illyrian period.

Almost every cultural and geographical region in the country has its own specific variety of costume that varies in detail, material, color, shape, and form. Albanian folk dress is often decorated with symbolic elements of Illyrian antique pagan origin, like suns, eagles, moons, stars, and snakes. Fabrics are traditionally made by weaving clothes using looms. To this day, some conservative old men and women mainly from the North wear traditional clothing in their daily lives. Instead, older women from the South usually wear all-black outfits. Men and boys are usually seen wearing long, white skirts and long socks that are similar to tights.

== Parts ==
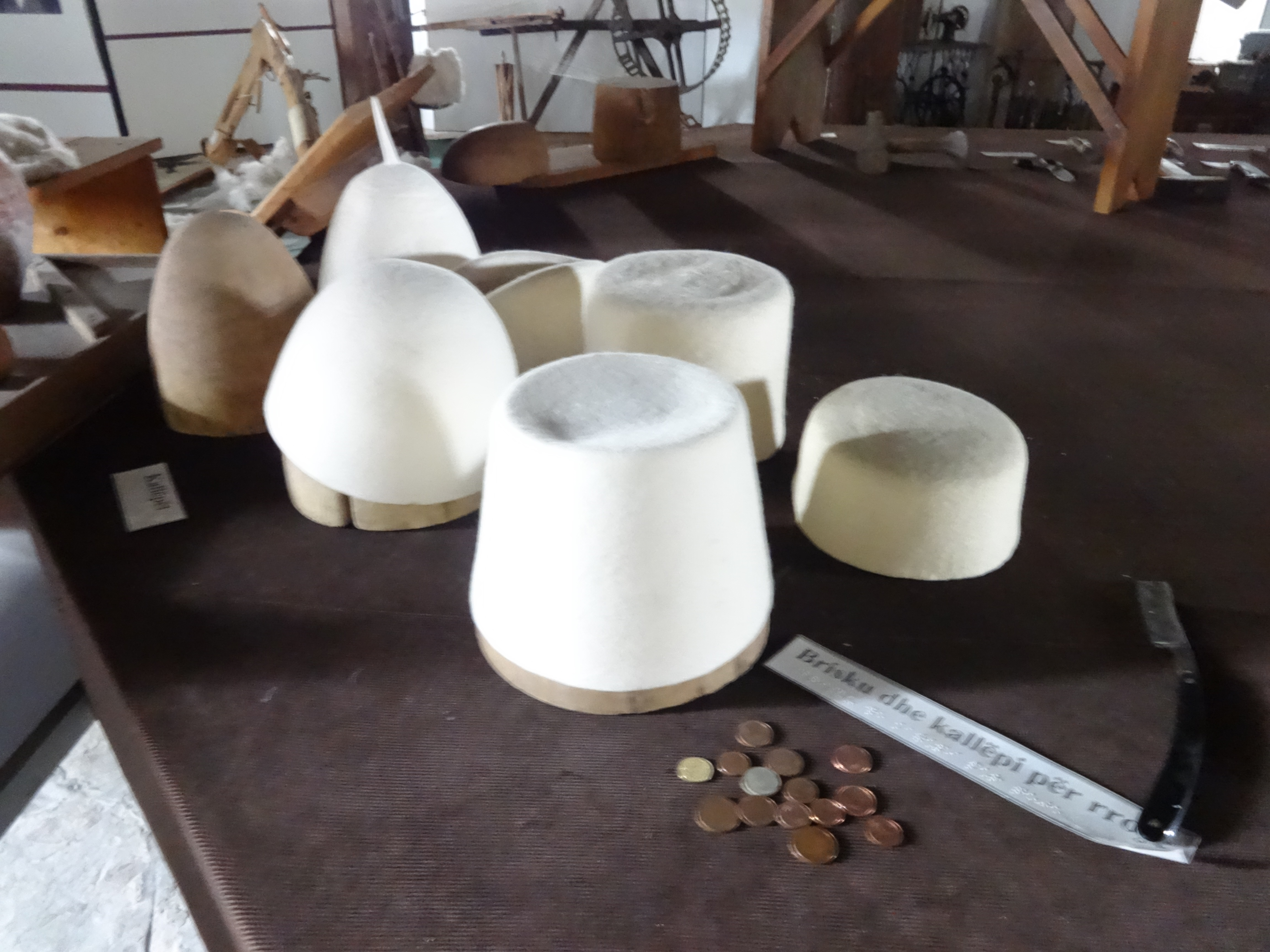
Qeleshe or plis

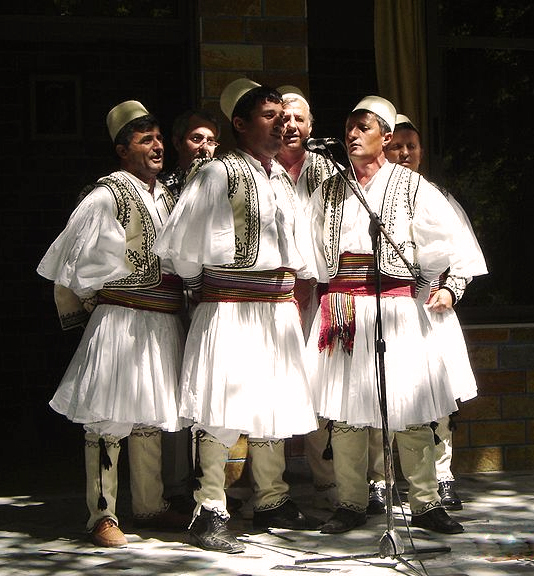
Fustanellë

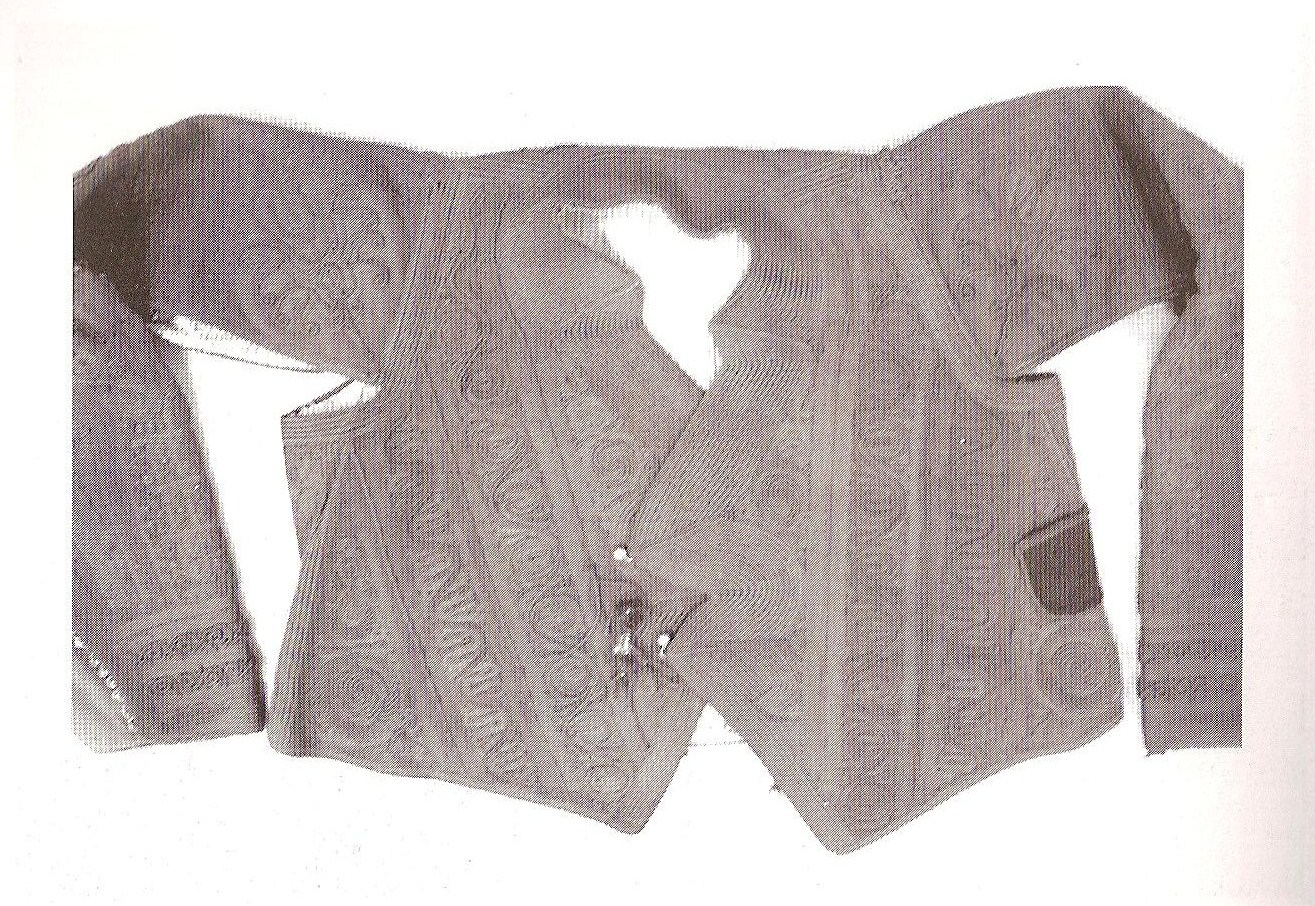
Xhamadan

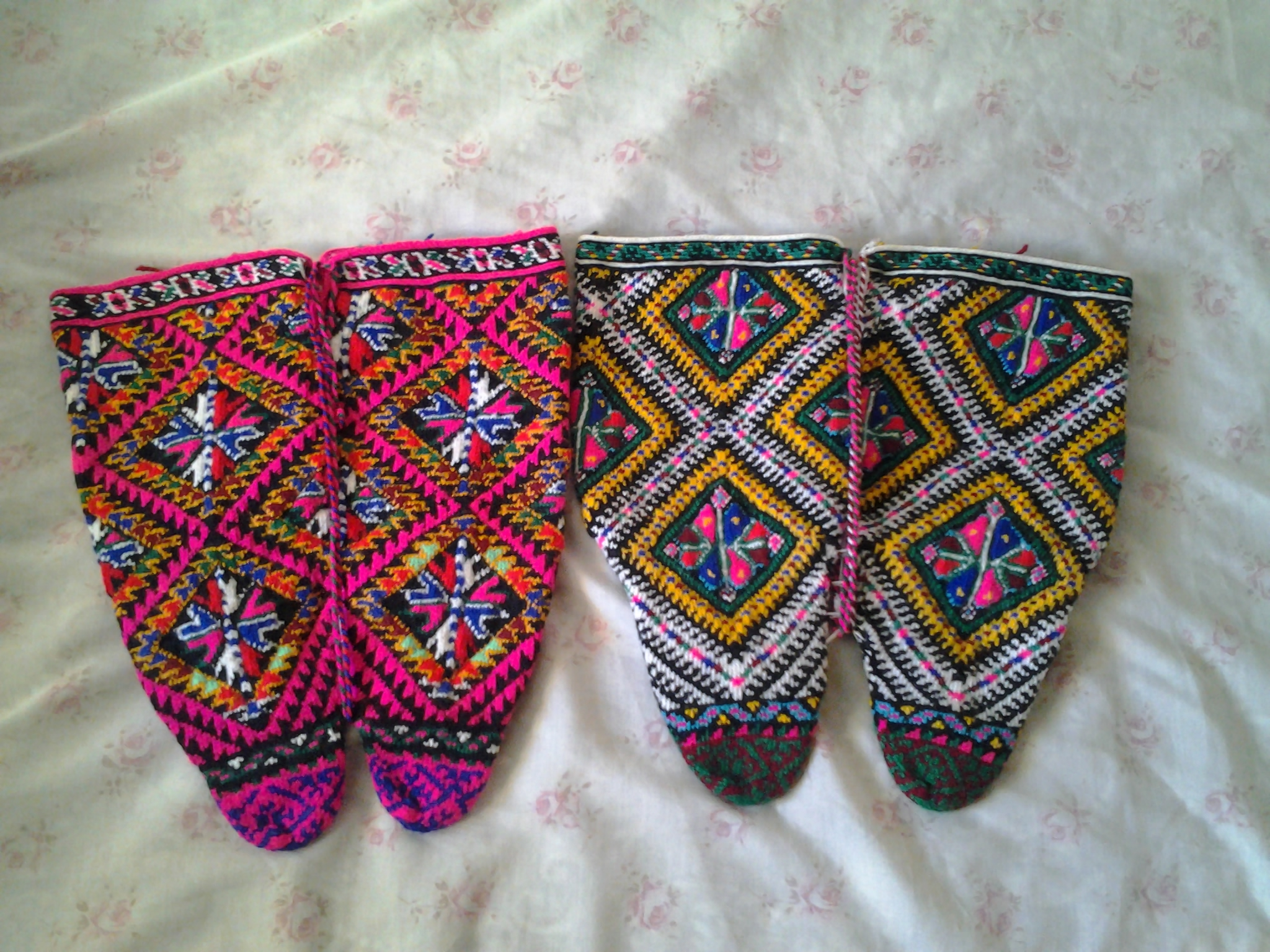
Çorape

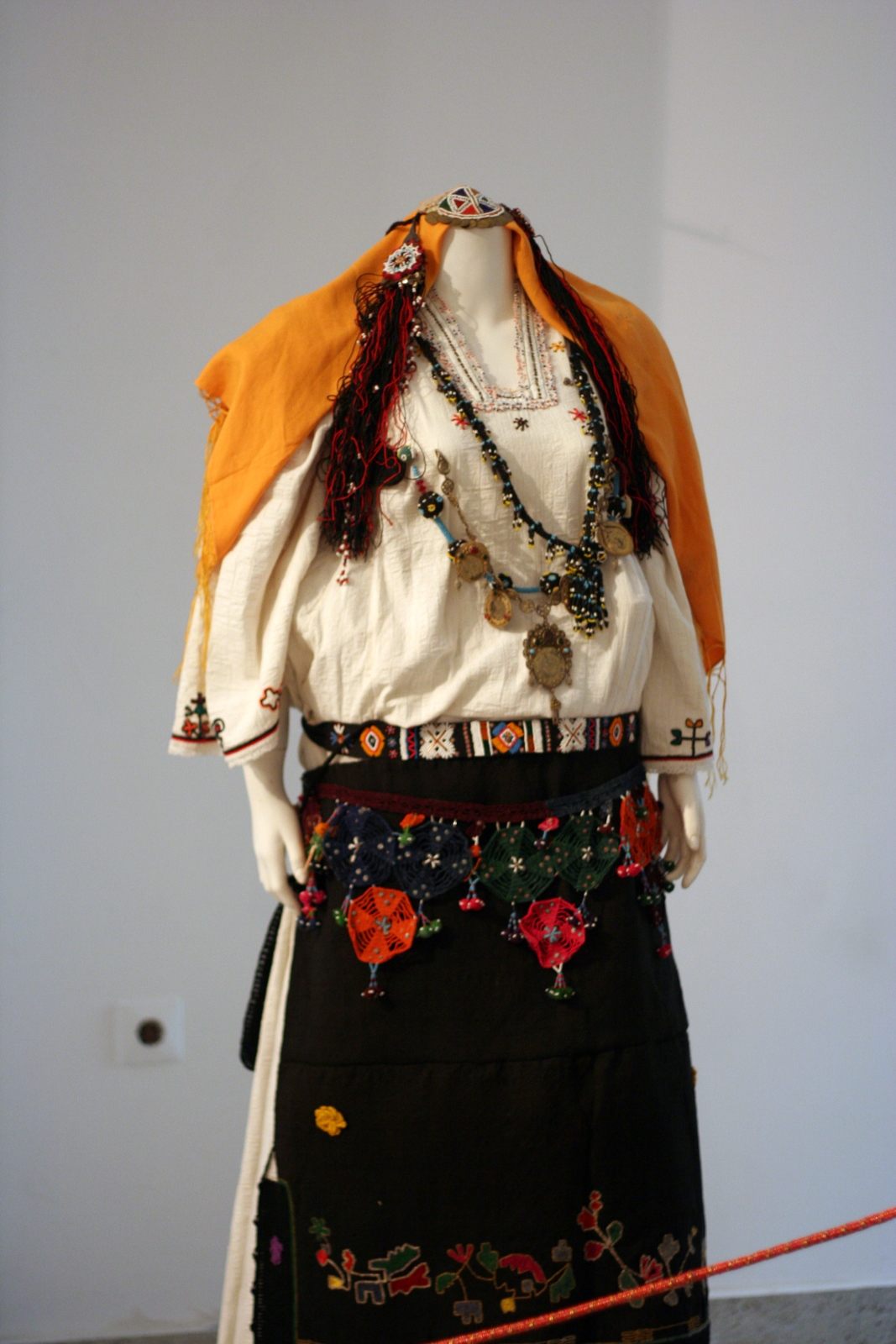
An Albanian costume from Kosovo

Albanian dress consists of the following

=== Headgear ===
==== Men ====
The following headdresses are in use for men:

- Qeleshe [cɛˈlɛʃɛ] or plis: a type of hat worn by men in Albania, Kosovo, and the Albanian-speaking parts of Greece and North Macedonia. In central Albania (Tirana, Durrës, Kavaja) it is cone-shaped, and in North Albania and Kosovo round.
- Albanian hat (French: Chapeau albanois) worn typically during the 15th to 18th centuries and immortalized in Onufri's paintings.
- Qylafë [ˈcylaf]: a woolen high hat worn in southern Albania.

==== Women ====
The following headdresses are in use for women:

- Kapica [kaˈpitsa]: a headdress for women.
- Langi, other names include: peshqira, riza, marhamë, pashnik.
- Lëvere [ləˈvɛɾɛ]: right shaped headdress.
- Kryqe [ˈkɾycɛ]: square shaped headdress.

=== Pants and upper body covers ===
- Fustanella [fustaˈnɛɫa]: traditional skirt-like garment worn by men.
- Tirqe [tiɾc]: long pants worn by men.
- Brekushe[bɾɛˈkuʃa]: for men and women.
- Xhubleta [dʒuˈblɛta]: Only worn by women.
- Mbështjellëse- Only worn by women.

=== Xhamadan ===
A xhamadan is a traditional vest, which is worn by Albanian men throughout Albania, in Kosovo, Albanians in North Macedonia, Albanians in Serbia, Albanians in Montenegro, and in the Arbëresh villages in Italy.

=== Brez ===
Brez are traditional belts, which are worn by Albanian men throughout Albania, in Kosovo, North Macedonia, Serbia, Montenegro, and in the Arbëresh villages in Italy.

=== Çorape ===
Çorape are traditional socks which are worn by Albanian men throughout Albania, in Kosovo, North Macedonia, Serbia, Montenegro, and in the Arbëresh villages in Italy.Çorape are other known as socks. But they were part of traditions.

=== Opinga ===
Opinga Albanian pronunciation: [ɔˈpiŋɡa]: (Art sandals), are traditional shoes which are worn by Albanian men throughout Albania, in Kosovo, North Macedonia, Serbia, Montenegro, and in the Arbëresh villages in Italy.

== Gallery ==
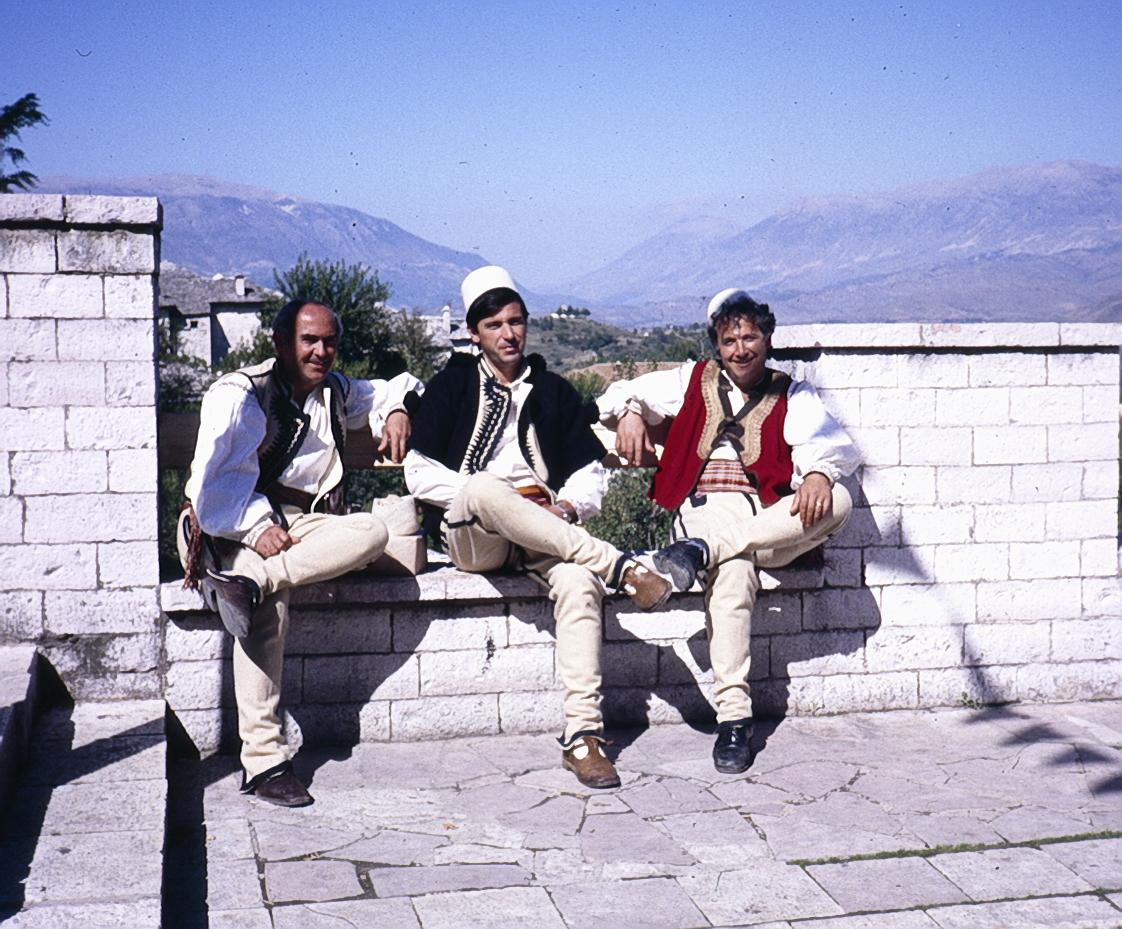
Albanian folk singers

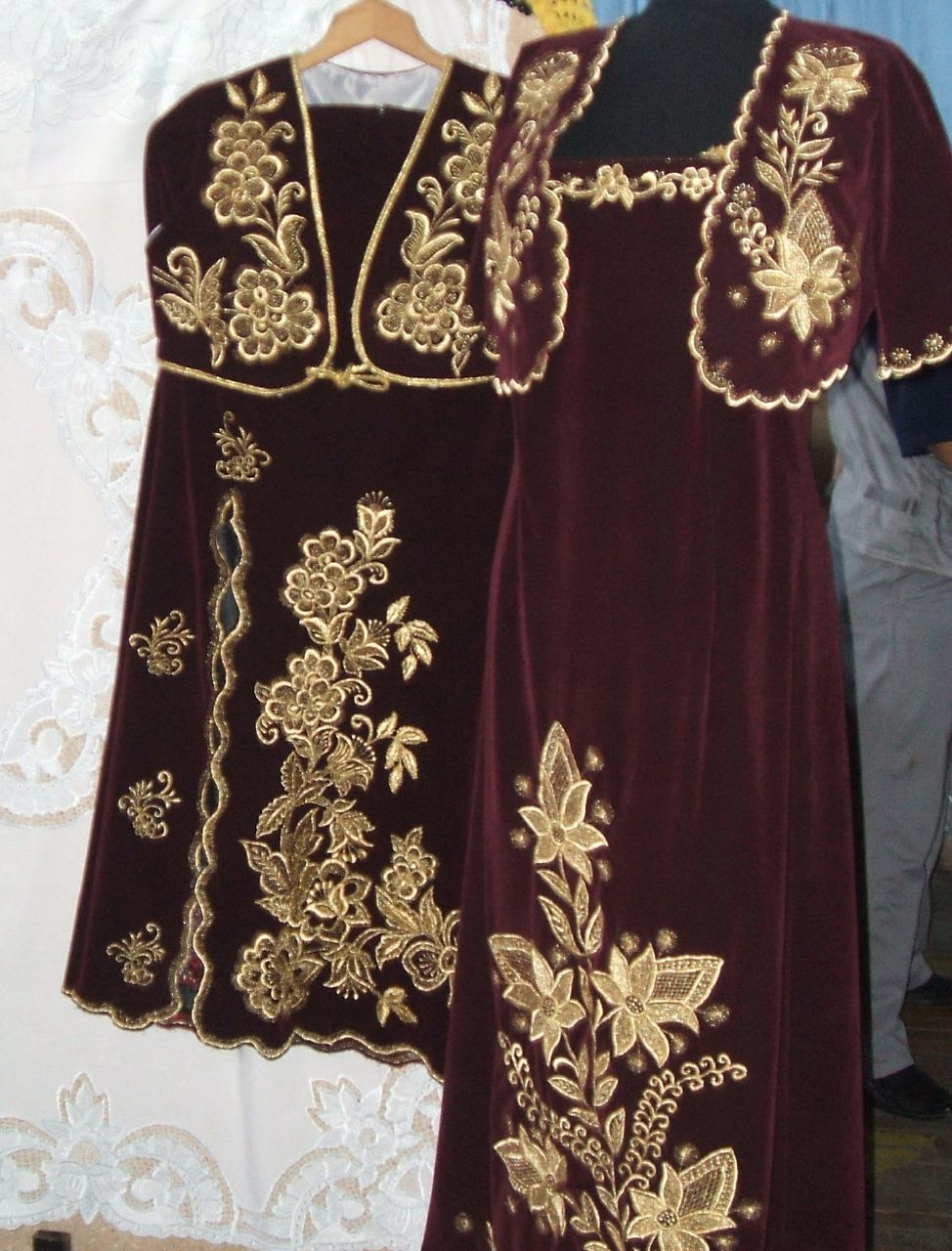
Central Albanian women's dresses

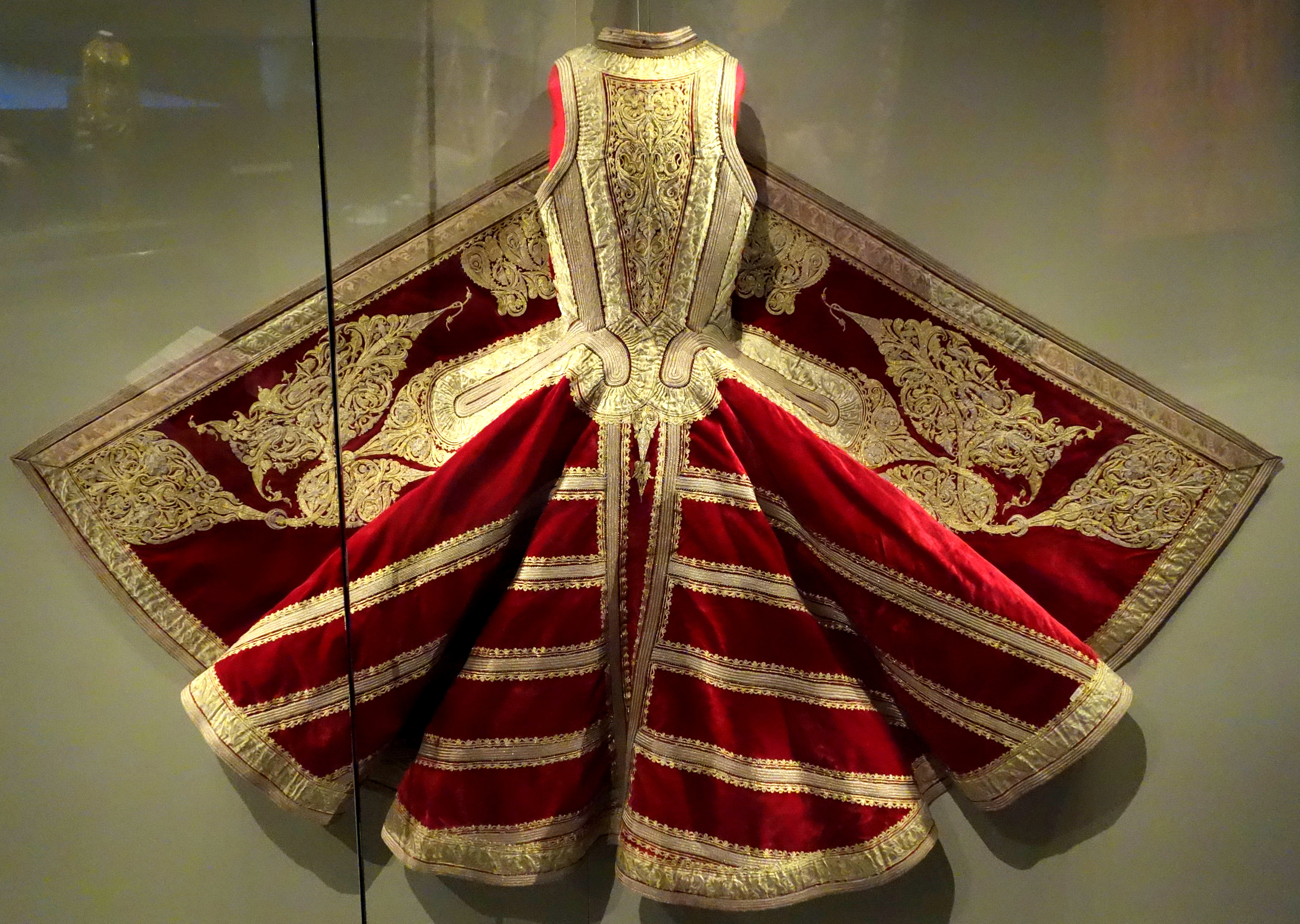
Woman's sleeveless jacket

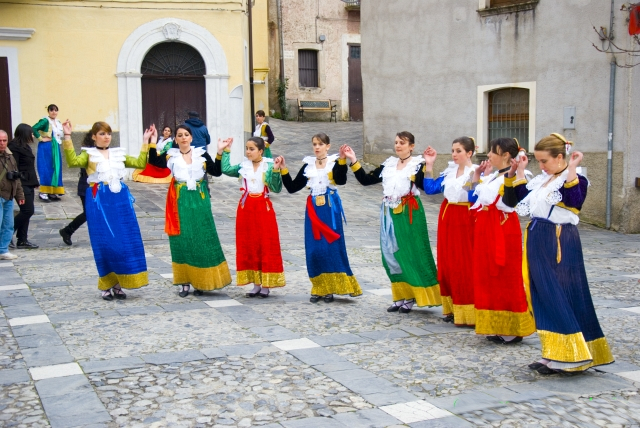
Arbëreshë women's clothing

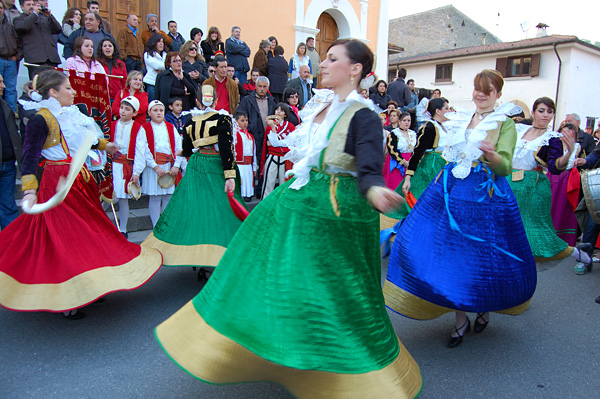
Arbëreshë women's clothing

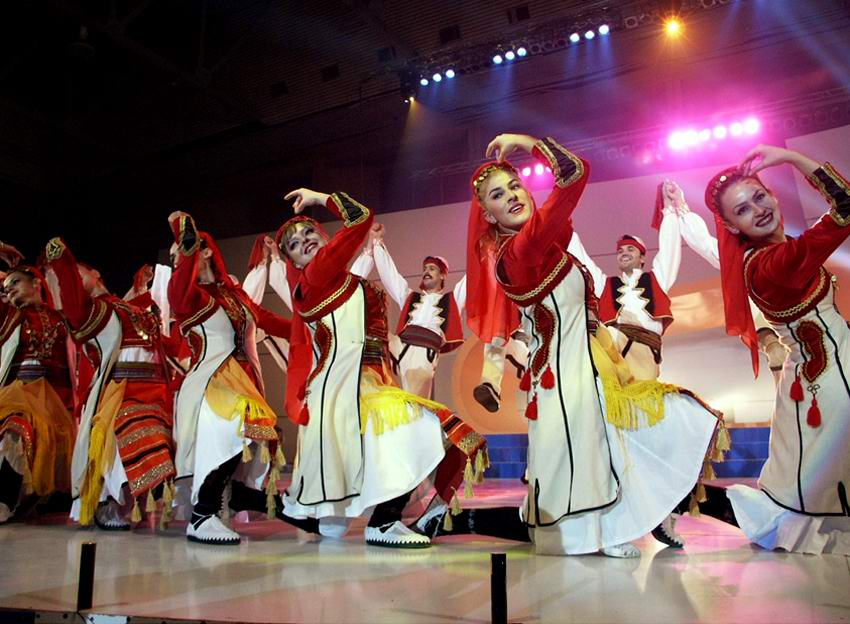
Costumes from Dibra

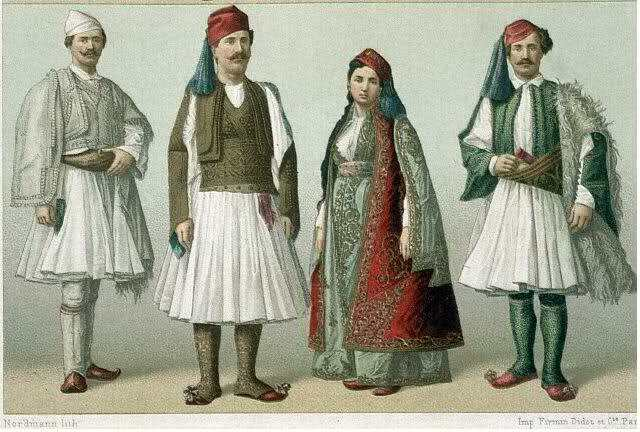
Fustanella

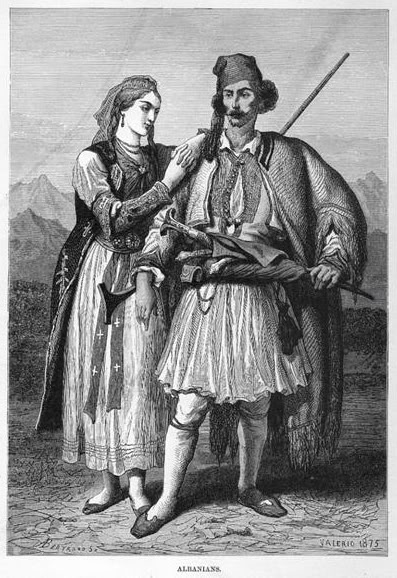
Albanians in Greece

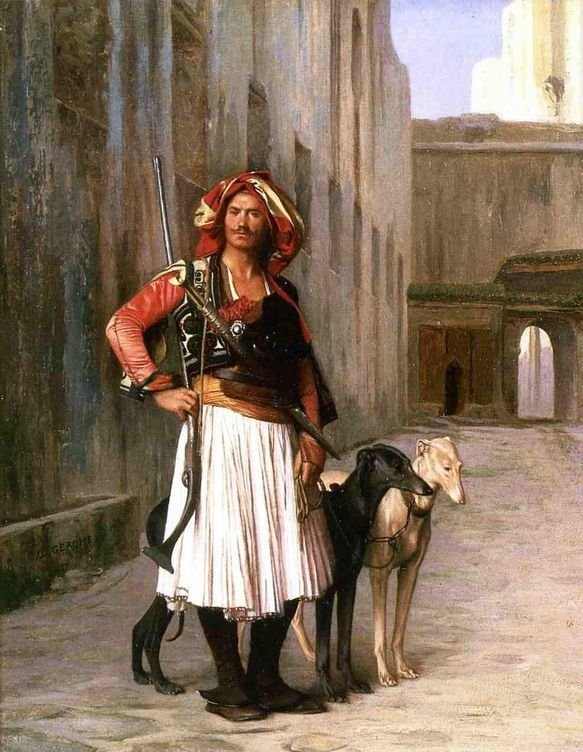
Albanian in Egypt

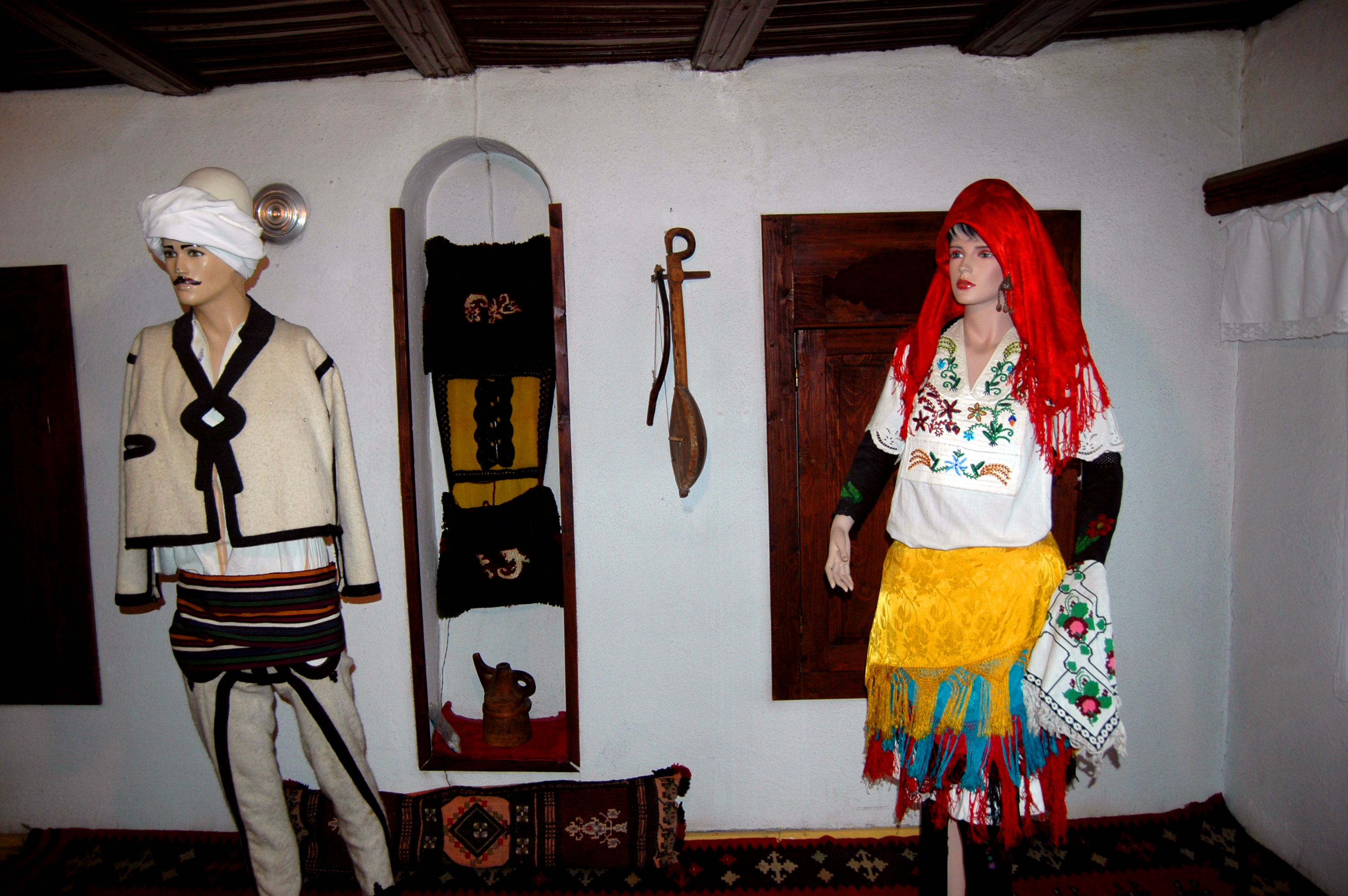
Traditional clothing

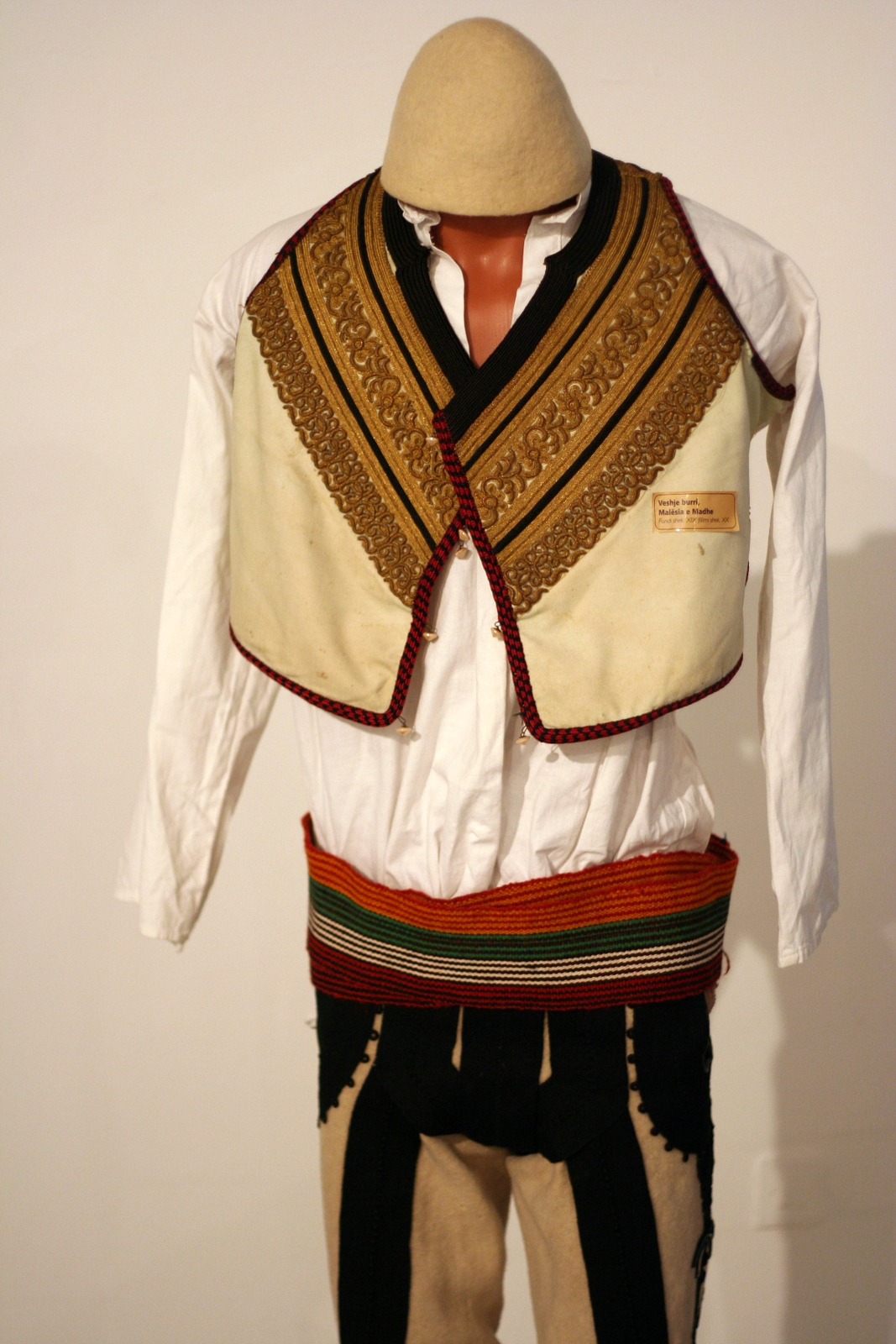
Albanian clothing from the Great Highlands

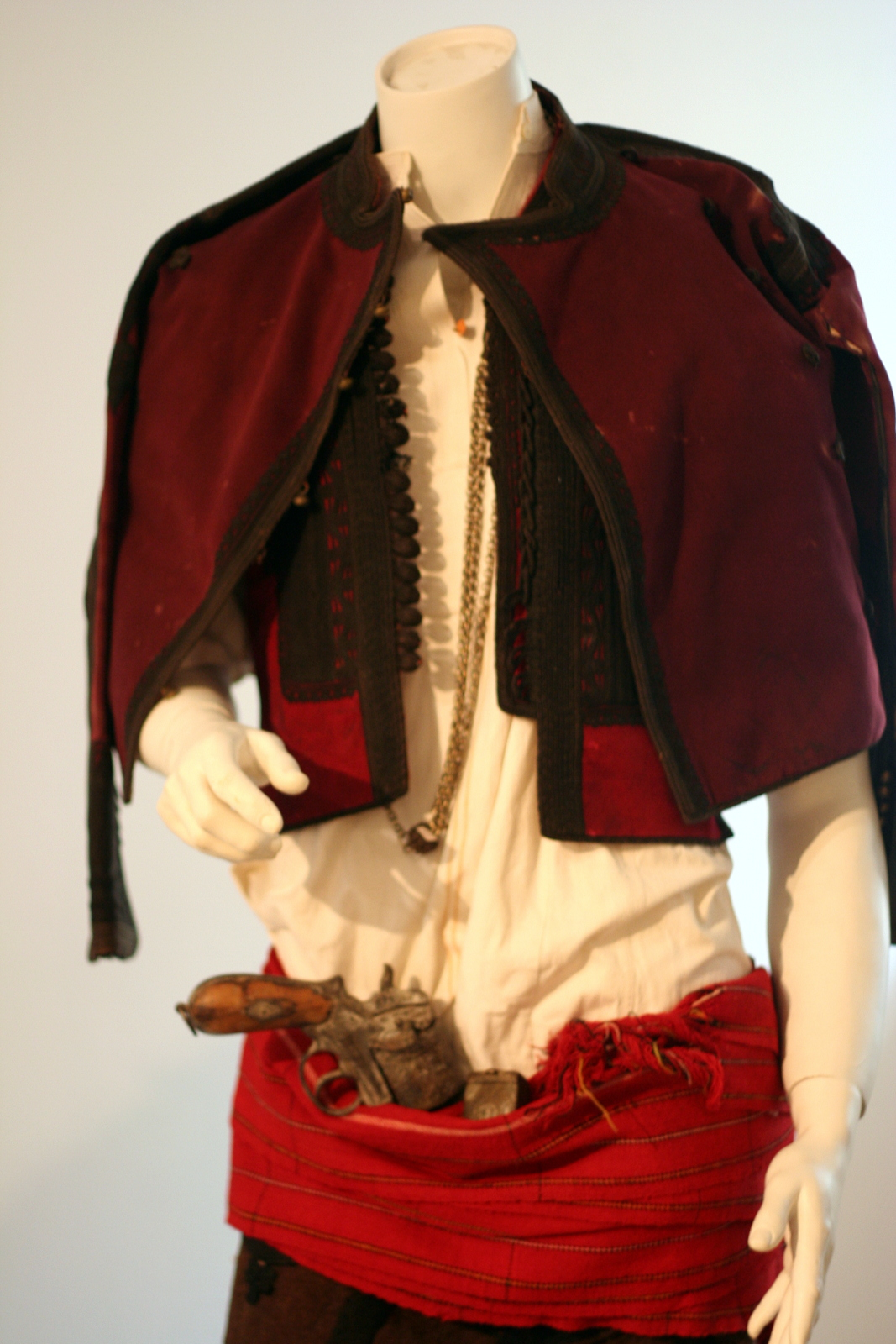
From Kosovo

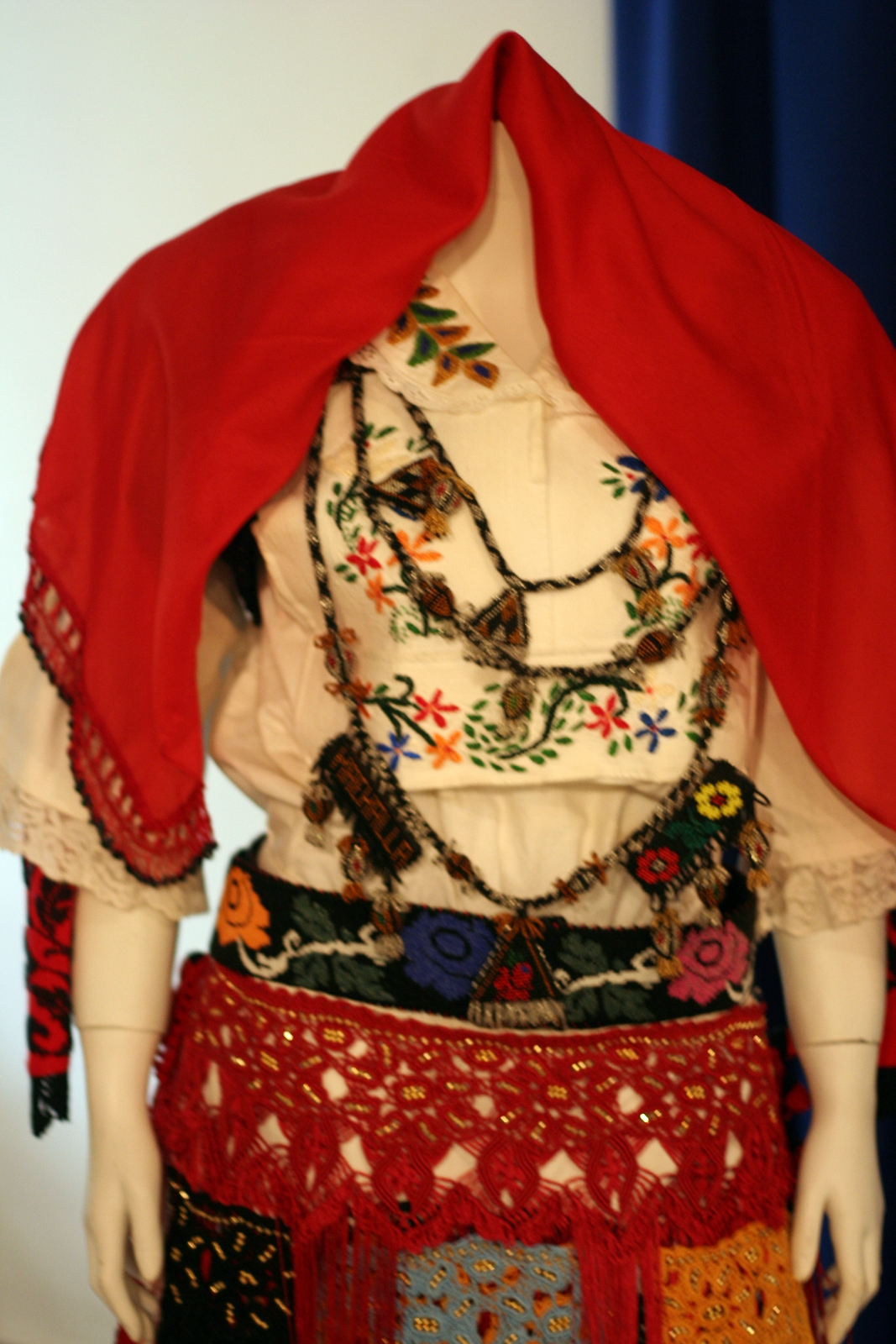
From Kosovo

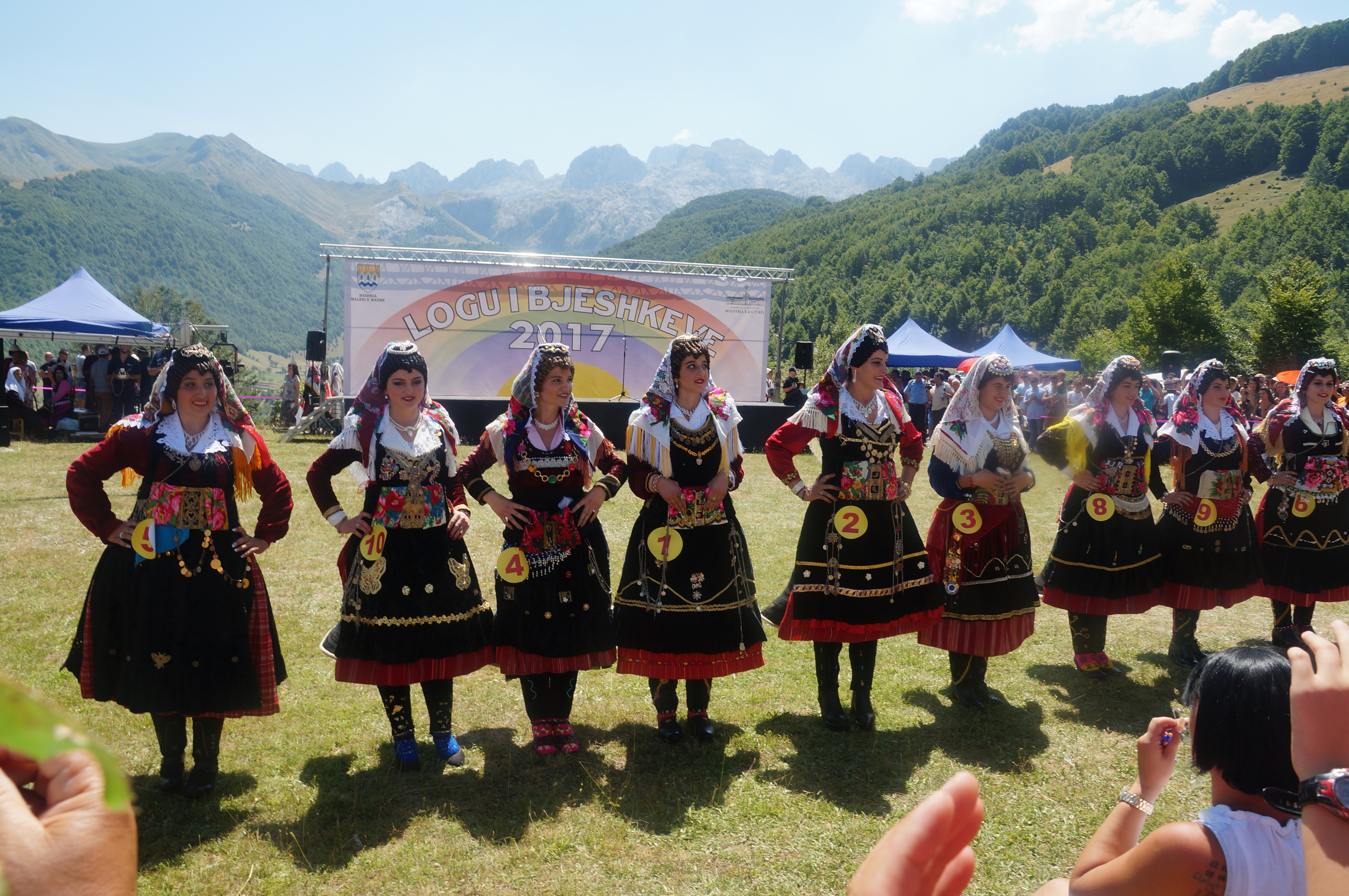
Kelmend region clothing

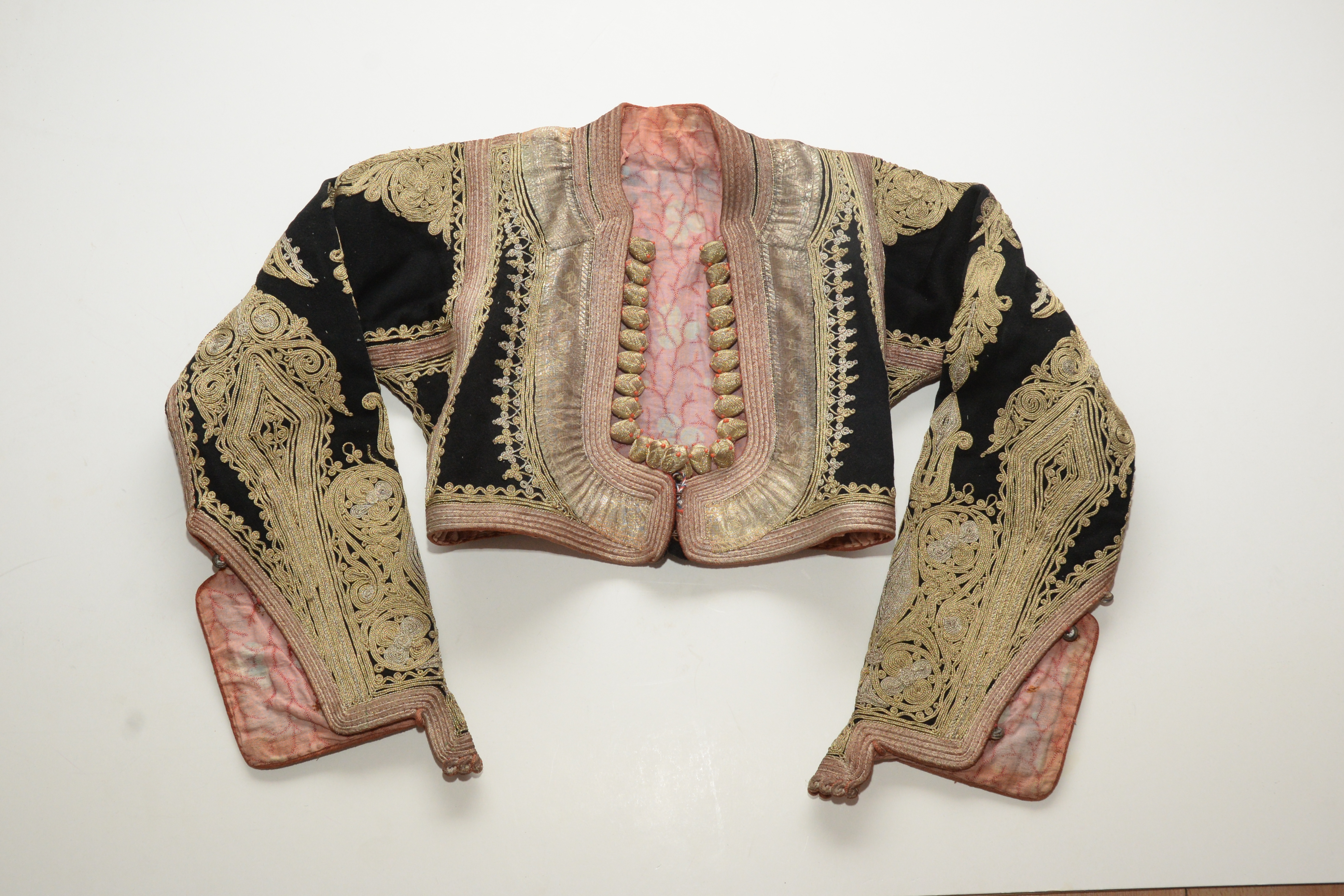
Mintan, an embroidered Albanian jacket.

== See also ==
- Culture of Albania
- Albanian dances
- Traditional clothing of Kosovo
- Gjirokastër National Folklore Festival
