= Ardian Trebicka =

Albanian singer (born 1967)

- Born: 15 December 1967 (age 58); Tirana, People's Socialist Republic of Albania
- Years active: 1996–present
- Musical career
- Genres: Serenade
- Occupation: singer
- Instruments: vocals

Ardian Trebicka (born 15 December 1967) is an Albanian singer and recording artist, noted for his emotionally expressive vocal style and for blending traditional musical influences with contemporary Albanian sound. He has released five studio albums: "Tango", "Dhe deti na ka zili", "Do bëhem cigan", the Arbëresh-inspired "Shkova ka dera jote" and "Kthim".

== Early life and education ==
Ardian Trebicka was born on 15 December 1967 in Tirana, People's Socialist Republic of Albania. From an early age, he developed a strong attachment to music, growing up in an environment influenced by musical nostalgia, particularly that of the serenade tradition, associated with the city of Korçë. He completed his primary education in Laç, where he spent most of his childhood and later enrolled at the Jordan Misja Artistic Lyceum, in Tirana, studying canto.

== Career ==
After completing his studies, Trebicka's artistic career was interrupted for two years as a result of the political and social upheaval of the time. He would continue his vocal training privately under the guidance of music professor Luk Kaçaj.

For a few years, he lived in Greece, where he continued developing his musical skills while facing economic and social hardship.

In the summer of 1996, Trebicka returned to Albania to resume his artistic career. Three years later, he would release his first studio album, Tango, featuring seven tracks. A collaboration with composer Ilirjan Mihali, resulted in the successful release of his second album, Dhe deti na ka zili, warmly received by the public.

His last album, "Kthim", was nominated for album of the year at the 2013 Kult Awards.

In August 2025, he performed at the Porto Palermo Festival, an event hosted by the Albanian Ministry of Tourism, Culture and Sports.

== Discography ==
=== Albums ===
Year	Album
1999	Tango
2001	Dhe deti na ka zili
2003	Do bëhem cigan
2005	Shkova ka dera jote
2011	Kthim
