= St. Anthony's Church, Laç =

Church of the Saint Anthony Monastery of Laç, Albania

St. Anthony Church
- Kisha e Shna Ndout (Albanian)
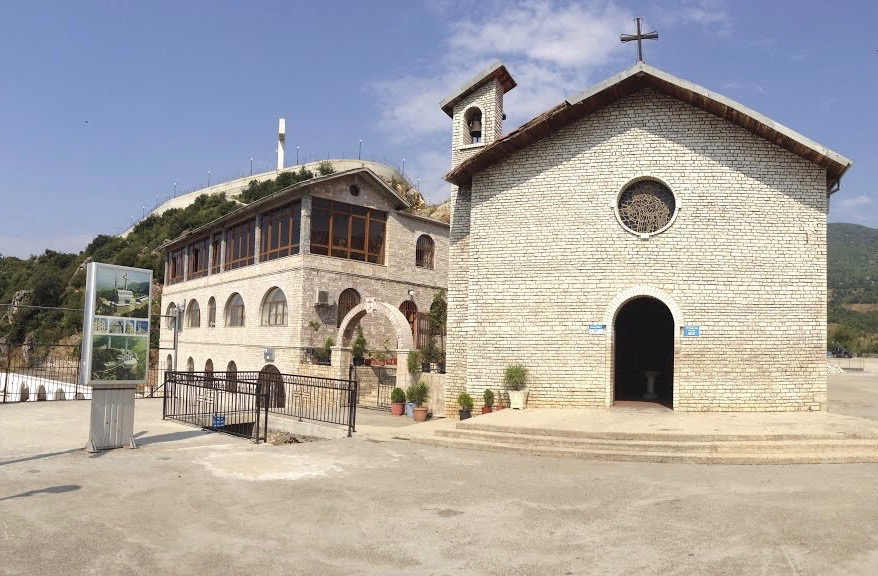
- The church in a 2012 picture
- Interactive map of St. Anthony Church
- 41°37′43.2″N 19°44′00.8″E
- Location: Laç, Albania

History
- Built: 1990s

Cultural Monument of Albania

St. Anthony's Church (Albanian: Kisha e Shna Ndout or Kisha e Laçit) is a Catholic monastery and church built in the 1990s on the site of a destroyed one from around 1300 in the Albanian town of Laç. Today it is visited also by Muslims and Bektashites.

== History ==
The site of the church was first built around year 1300, and dedicated to St. Mary, then renamed after Anthony of Padua in 1557. It was built on a place previously held sacred by pagan sun worshippers and became a place of pilgrimage for Roman Catholic and Orthodox Christians as well as Muslims for its purported miraculous healing powers. In 1964, the church was mostly destroyed by the communist regime in Albania but the walls still remained. In 1981, Albanian Communist soldiers arrived to completely remove all trace of the church. After demolishing one wall, it is reported that 32 soldiers were miraculously paralyzed from the waist down. The Communist authorities claimed it was food poisoning and attempted to suppress media coverage of the reported miracle.

The church was eventually fully rebuilt in the 1990s after funding from Germany, with the works being completed in 2000. It is a Franciscan church. Many renowned clergy have served in the church, including Shtjefën Gjeçovi, Vinçens Prennushi, Klement Miraj, Robert Ashta, and Zef Pllumi. The church attracts over a million pilgrims every year. The pilgrimage traditionally starts on 12 June with pilgrims gathering before the full pilgrimage walk to the church. As part of the pilgrimage, some pilgrims take five white stones and whisper to each before putting them back, whilst others approach the church barefoot and place their feet into cracks in the rocks.
