= Bajzë =

- Town
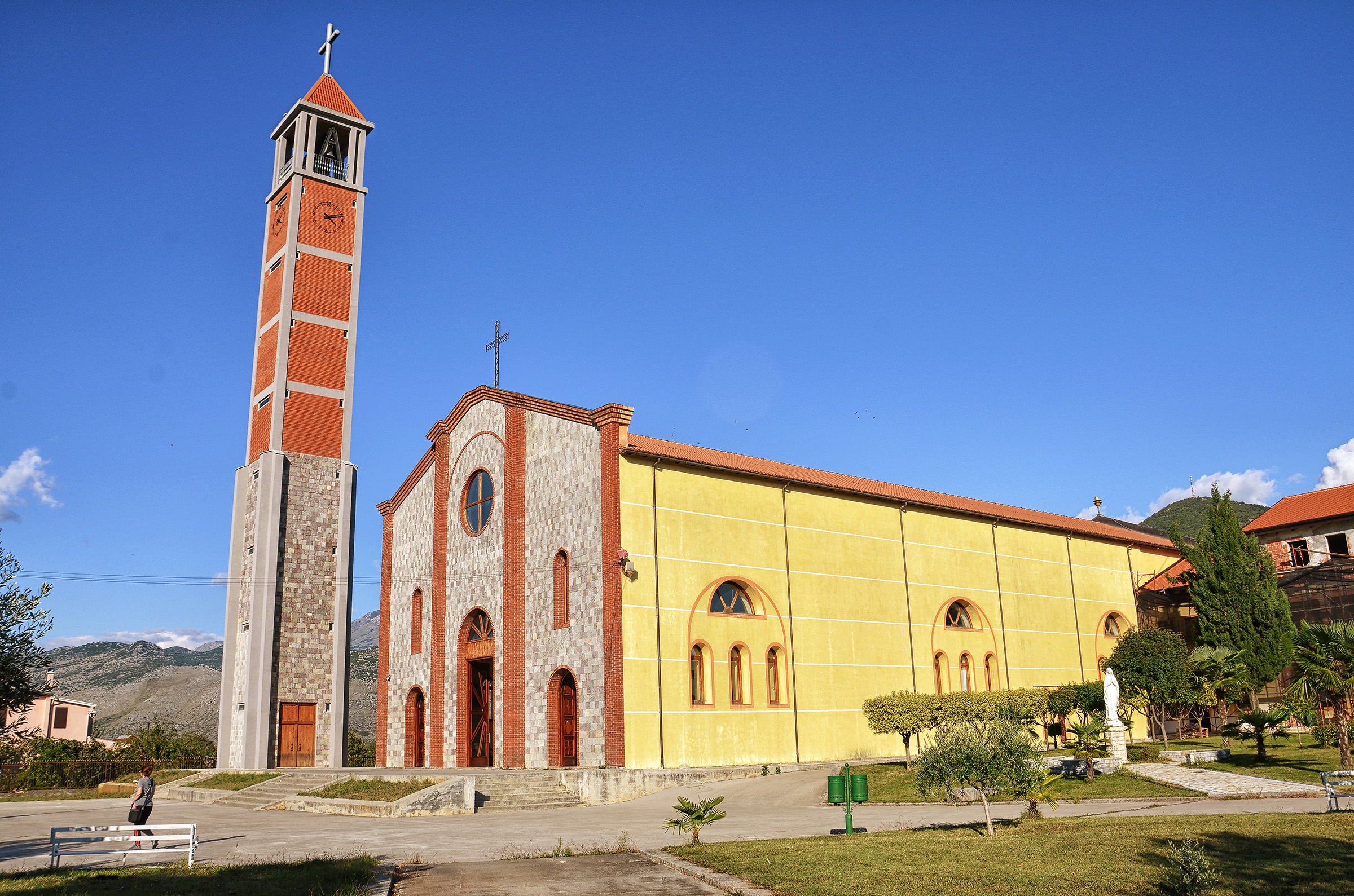
- St Paul's Church 2019 in Bajzë

- Location within Albania
- Coordinates: 42°16′35″N 19°25′56″E
- Country: Albania
- County: Shkodër
- Municipality: Malësi e Madhe
- Administrative unit: Kastrat

Population
  - Total: 2,346
- Time zone: UTC+1 (CET)
  - Summer (DST): UTC+2 (CEST)

Bajzë is a small town in the former Kastrat Municipality, Shkodër County, northern Albania. At the 2015 local government reform it became part of the municipality Malësi e Madhe. It has a population of 2,346.

== Transport ==
=== Road ===
Bajzë is located on the European route E762, important for its economic development. This road allows for connection to the nearby city of Koplik and the rest of Albania to the south and to Podgorica (Montenegro) to the north.

=== Rail ===
Bajzë is situated on the only international railway of Albania, from Shkodër to Podgorica in Montenegro via the border crossing Han i Hotit. As of 2015, there are only freight services on this line. The Bajzë Rail Station is located near the town centre.
