= Xhubleta =

Folk skirt worn by Albanian women

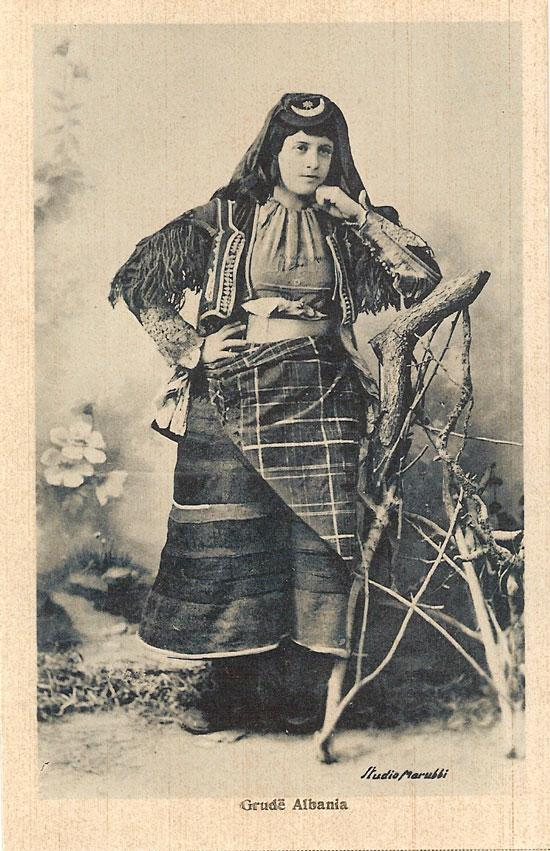
Woman from Grudë wearing a xhubleta in a 19th-century Pietro Marubi photo.

The xhubleta is an undulating, bell-shaped folk skirt, traditionally worn by Albanian women in northern Albania, Kosovo, North Macedonia and Montenegro. It is a garment that survived from ancient times exclusively in Albanian inhabited territories, and it is a unique type of dress for its particular shape, structure, and decorating system. There are two types of xhubleta: one is narrow and the other is large. The Xhubleta was included in the List of Intangible Cultural Heritage in Need of Urgent Safeguarding by UNESCO in 2022.

== Etymology ==
The Albanian name xhubleta is considered to be inherited from Proto-Albanian *jú-(m)blit-ā, "bee", in turn inherited from the Balkan Indo-European *h₁sú-melit, "having good honey". The semantic link between the Albanian xhubleta and the bee is supported by a network of relations involving Albanian culture and ancient Mediterranean culture, including the Minoan civilization and the mythology of Zeus and Melissa.

== History ==
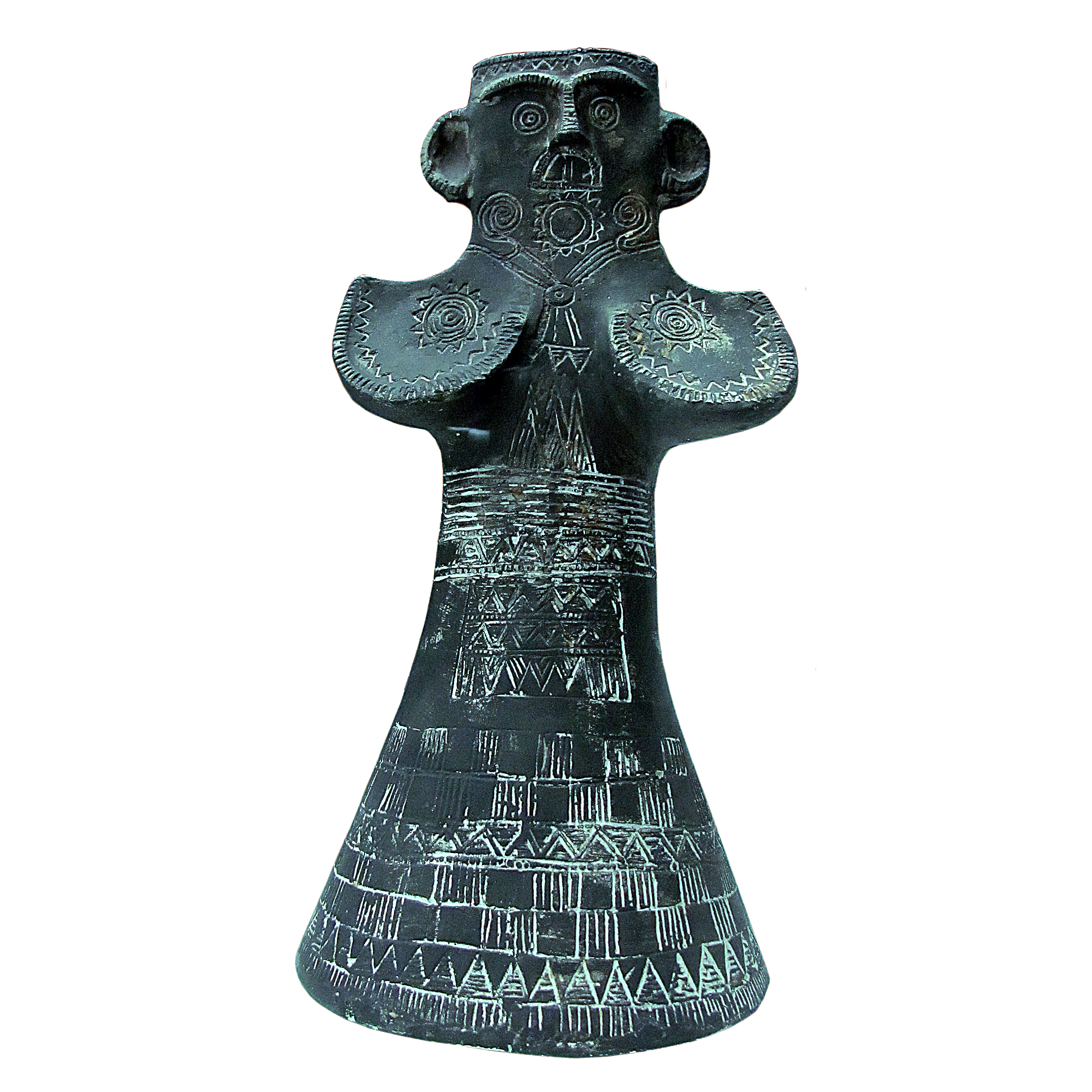
Bronze Age Illyrian terracotta figurine with a xhubleta-like garment.

The xhubleta has ancient origins. It represents similarities to wearing of some Balkan Neolithic and Illyrian Bronze Age figures, but also of some figures in other areas of the Mediterranean region, belonging to the second millennium BC, and linking accordingly with old Mediterranean cultures. Garments with similar bell-shapes are also worn by goddesses and female dancers depicted on monuments of the Roman era in the Balkans.

The xhubleta is usually decorated with Albanian sacred symbolic elements of ancient pagan origins, such as the symbols of the sun (Dielli), of the moon (Hana), of the stars, eagles, and serpents (Vitore). The mostly geometric ornaments show a particularly archaic feature of this costume. Many of those symbols belong to the southern Illyrian religious repertoire. Some symbols are of apotropaic nature against evil (diseases, evil spirits and influences such as syni i keq, the evil eye), and they match Illyrian chains found in tumuli in Albania. Some ornaments of the xhubleta are representations of hands, which are also the shape of some Illyrian amulets.

== Description ==
Xhubleta, skills, craftsmanship and forms of usage
- UNESCO Intangible Cultural Heritage
- Country: Albania
- Reference: 01880
- Region: Europe and North America

Inscription history
- Inscription: 2022 (17th session)
- List: Need of Urgent Safeguarding

The xhubleta usually is hung on the shoulders using two straps. It has 13 to 17 strips and 5 pieces of felt. The bosom and the part of the xhubleta covered by the apron are made out of crocheted black wool. The bell shape is accentuated in the back part.

There are two types of xhubleta: one is narrow and the other is large. In regard to colors, only two colors are nowadays used: the white one for the unmarried women and the black one for the married ones, however in the past many colors were used, as witnessed by a 17th-century author, who claimed that the peacock did not have as many colors as the xhubleta worn by the women of Kelmend. It is thought that the diminishing in colors in the last two centuries is due to the limitation of its use only in remote mountainous areas.

== See also ==
- Traditional Albanian clothing
- List of Intangible Cultural Heritage elements in Albania
- List of World Heritage Sites in Albania

== Bibliography ==
- Bido, Agim (1998). "Pagan Symbols in Albanian Xhubleta". The Thracian world at the crossroads of civilisations. Vol. 2. Institutul Român de Tracologie. pp. 701–712.
- Dedvukaj, Lindon (2025). "The 'queen bee' of the highlands: An etymological analysis of the Albanian xhubleta". Proceedings of the Linguistic Society of America. 10 (1). Linguistic Society of America. doi:10.3765/plsa.v10i1.5881.
