= Laç =

- Administrative unit
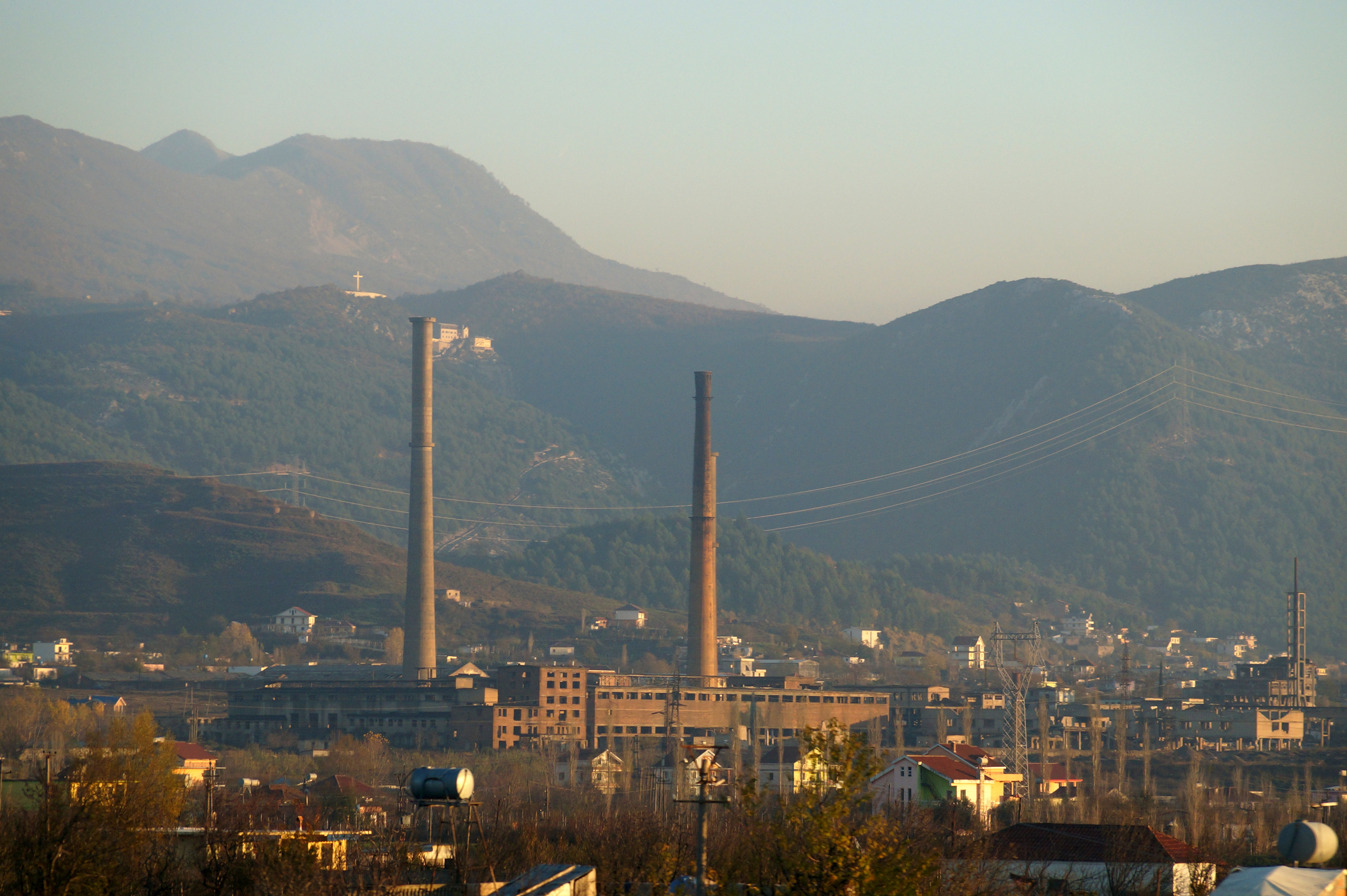
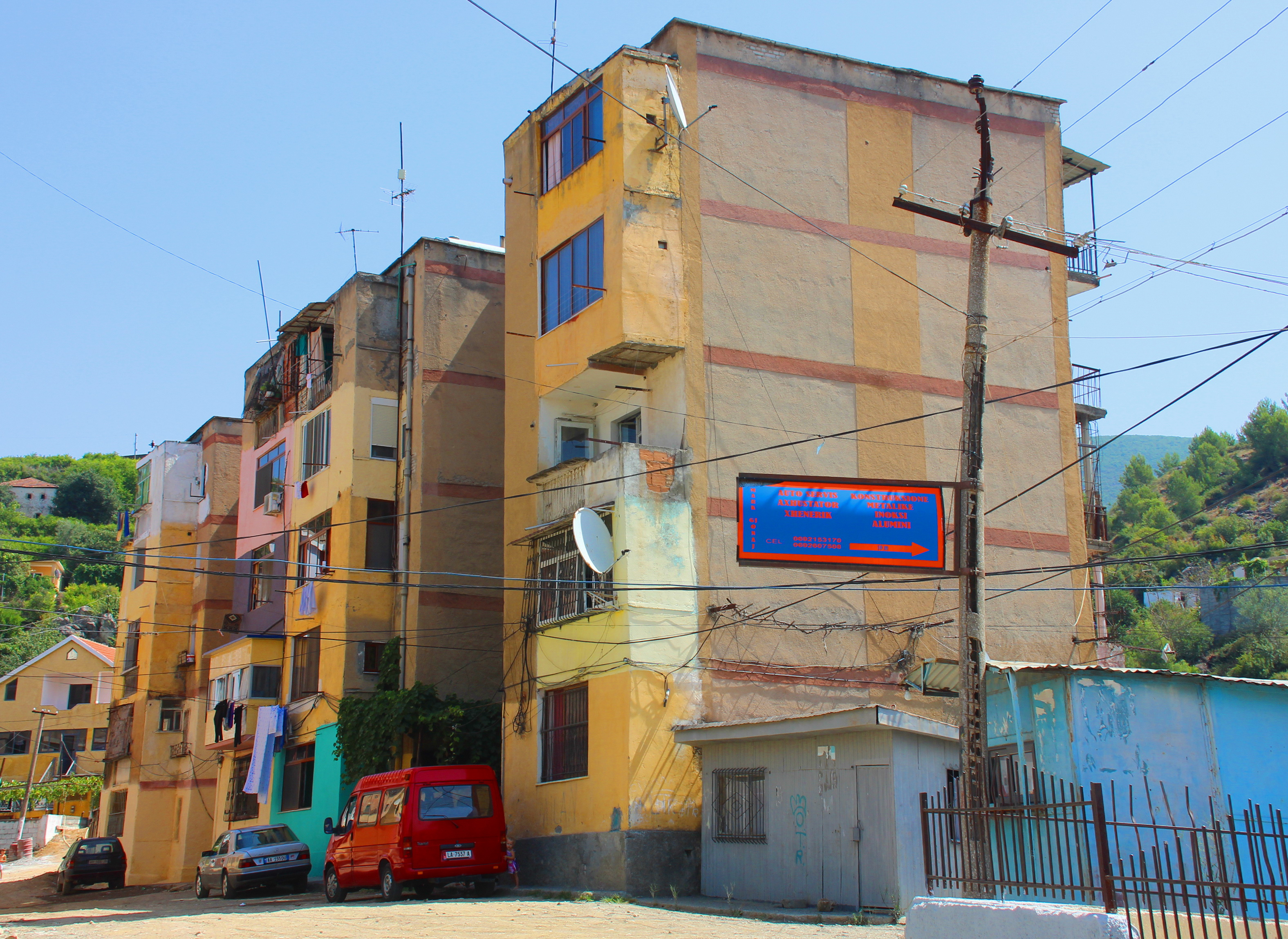
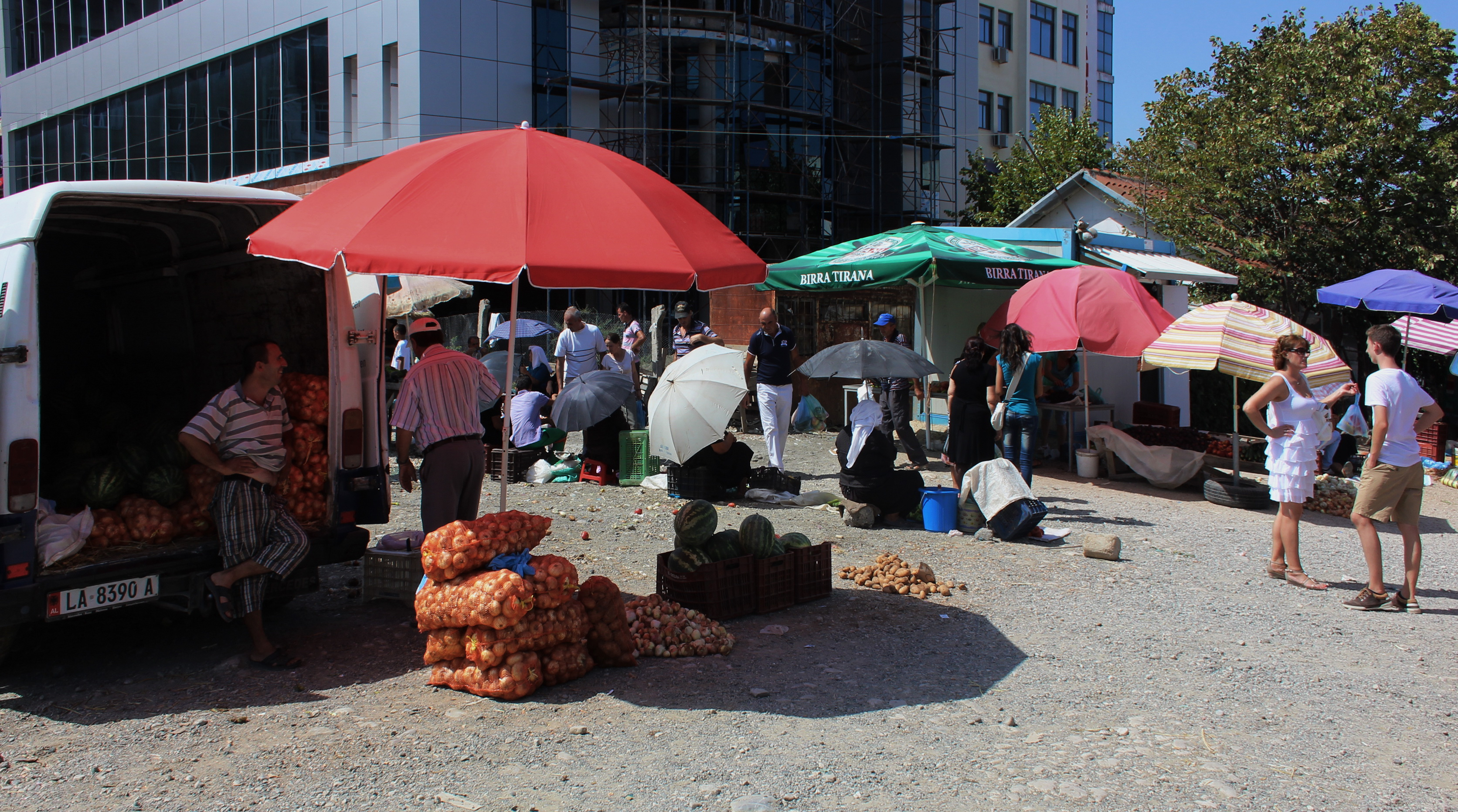
- From the top, View of Laç, Apartment Buildings, Laç Market

- Location within Albania
- Coordinates: 41°38′7″N 19°42′47″E
- Country: Albania
- County: Lezhë
- Municipality: Kurbin
  - Administrative unit: 14.18 km^{2} (5.47 sq mi)
- Elevation: 27 m (89 ft)

Population (2023)
  - Administrative unit: 12,854
  - Administrative unit density: 906.5/km^{2} (2,348/sq mi)
- Time zone: UTC+1 (CET)
  - Summer (DST): UTC+2 (CEST)
- Postal Code: 4701-4703
- Area Code: (0)53

Laç (pronounced [lat͡ʃ]; Albanian definite form: Laçi) is a town and a former municipality in Lezhë County, northwestern Albania. At the 2015 local government reform it became a subdivision and the seat of the municipality Kurbin. It was the administrative center of the former Kurbin District. The population as of the 2023 census is 12,854. Its associated football club is KF Laçi.

Laç is served by Laç Railway Station.

== Name ==
Laç means swampy land in Albanian. Similar toponyms in Albania are Laç-Bruç, Kodër-Laç, Përroi i Laçit, Fushë-Laç etc.

== Demographic history ==
Historical population
Year	Pop.	±%
1969	5,500	—
1979	9,500	+72.7%
1989	18,123	+90.8%
2001	19,424	+7.2%
2011	17,086	−12.0%
2023	12,854	−24.8%

Laç is recorded in the Ottoman defter of 1467 as a hass-ı mir-liva property in the vilayet of Kurbin. The settlement had only four households which were represented by the following household heads: Pal Suma, Nikolla Smaka, Gjergj Marku, and Tanush Znishi.

== Church of St. Anthony ==
Known as "Kisha e Laçit" or "Kisha e Shna Ndout" in Albanian, this church is dedicated to St Anthony of Padua.

== Notable people ==
- Qazim Laçi (born 1996), Albanian footballer with origins from Laç.
- Salvador Gjonaj (born 26 September 1992), Albanian footballer.
- Jimilian (born 1994), Danish-Albanian singer.
- Ardian Trebicka, singer

=== Albani family ===
- Pope Clement XI (Latin: Clemens XI; Italian: Clemente XI; 23 July 1649 – 19 March 1721), born Giovanni Francesco Albani, head of the Catholic Church and ruler of the Papal States from 23 November 1700 to his death in March 1721. He’s from the Albani family, which has its origins in Laç.
- Alessandro Albani (1692–1779), Italian aristocrat and cardinal.
- Annibale Albani (1682–1751), Italian cardinal.
- Francesco Albani (1578–1660), Baroque painter.
- Gian Girolamo Albani (1504–1591), Roman Catholic cardinal.
- Gian Francesco Albani (1720–1803), Roman Catholic cardinal.

== See also ==
- Saint Anthony Church
- Cave of Saint Blaise
