= Han i Hotit =

Border crossing point in Albania

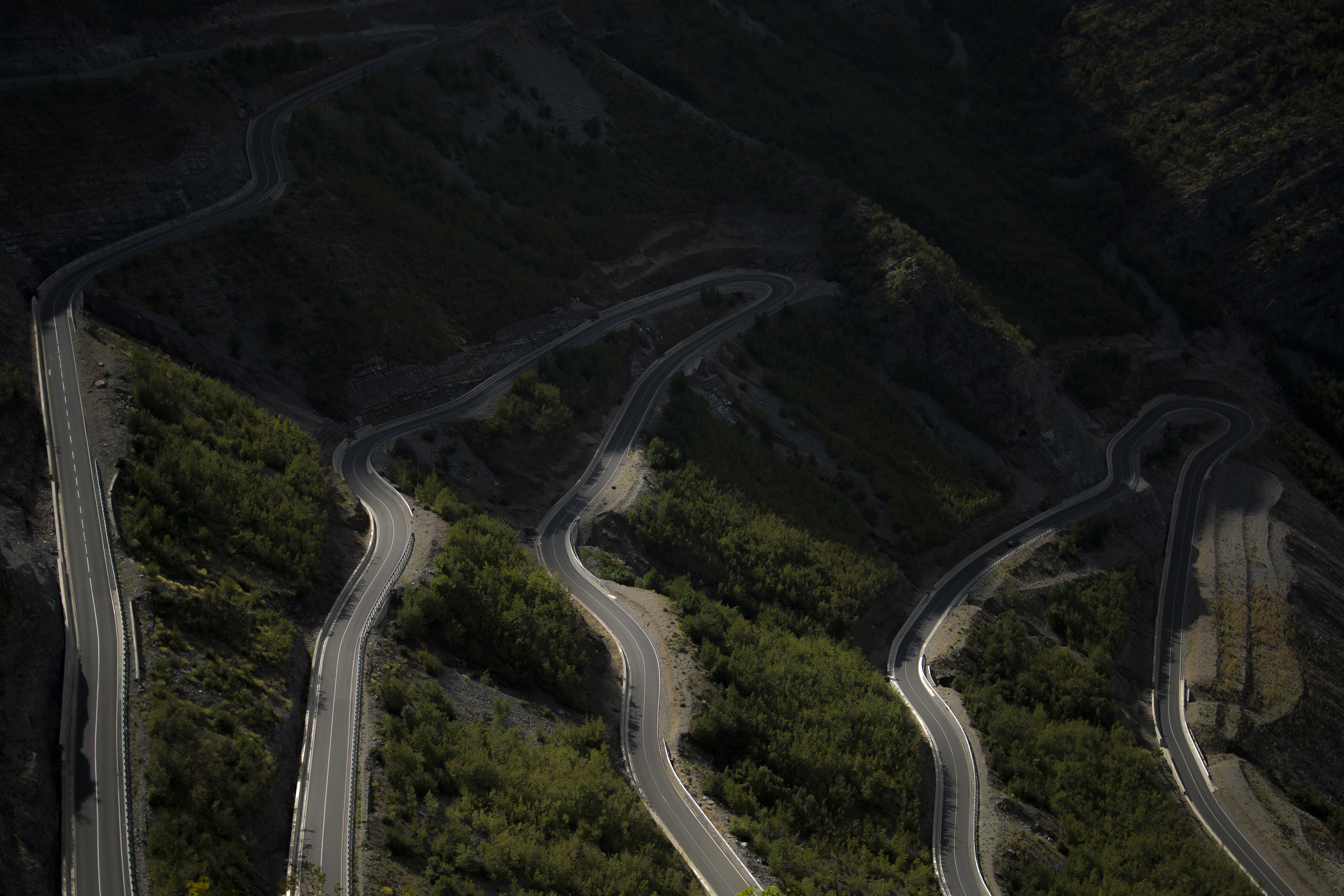
- Hani i Hotit

- Location within Albania
- Traversed by: SH1

Third Approach
- Location: Albania
- Range: Border crossings of Albania
- Coordinates: 42°19′53″N 19°25′18″E

Han i Hotit (Albanian definite form: Hani i Hotit) is a location in northwestern part of Albania where a border crossing point between Albania and Montenegro is situated.
