= Class 31 =

Class 31 may refer to:

- British Rail Class 31
- EAR 31 class
- GER Class N31
- HSH Class 31
- L&YR Class 31
- NBR Class M 4-4-0, later LNER Class D31
- No.31-class patrol boat
- Seibu Class E31
- South African Class 31-000
