= Sali Verdha =

Albanian war veteran (1918–2009)

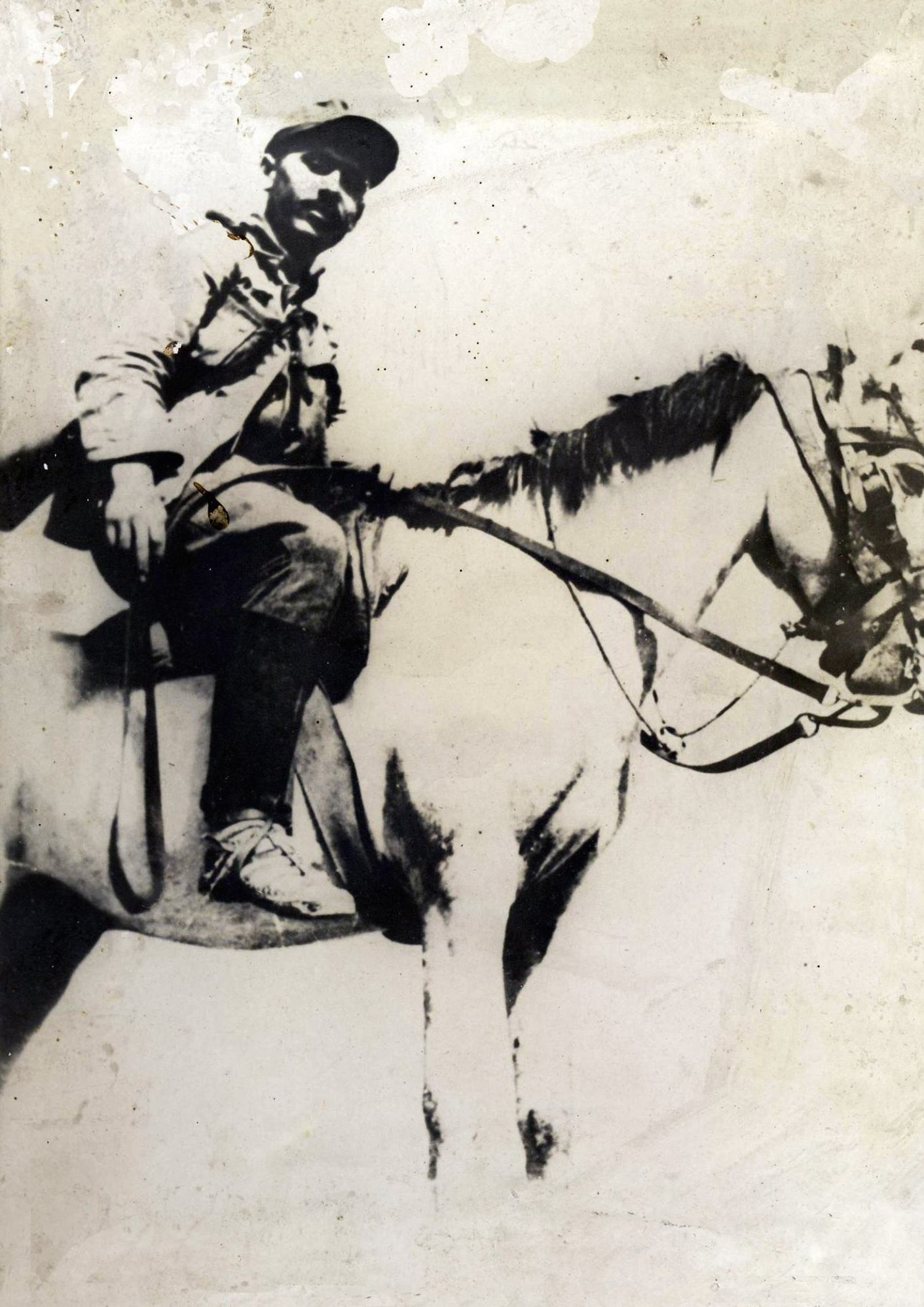

Member of the Albanian Parliament
- In office 19 September 1966 – 19 June 1974

Personal details
- Born: January 10, 1918 Kavajë, Albania
- Died: 31 May 2009 (aged 91)
- Party: Labour Party

Sali Verdha (10 January 1918 – 31 May 2009) was a distinguished World War 2 veteran who joined the ranks of the anti-fascist movement "Çeta e Pezës" and later led the 12th Shock Brigade which fought for the liberation of Pukë and Shkodër.

== Career ==
After the war, Verdha was appointed as director of Albania's National Railways, a post which he held from 1950-1962. He served as Chairman of the Durrës Committee from 1962-1968. During this time he was elected as a member of the Albanian Parliament for two terms (1966-1974). In the following years, he would serve as special advisor of electrification in the Adil Çarçani government and was later appointed as Deputy Minister of Transportation. He has authored several wartime memoirs.

== Memoirs ==
- Nëpër Pezën Partizane (1969)
- Peza, shkëndijë e luftës partizane (1978)
- Peza në luftë (1997)
- Heroi i popullit "Kajo Karafili" (2003)
- Peza heroike e martire (2003)
