= E31 =

E31 may refer to:

- European route E31, a series of roads in Europe
- Seibu Class E31, a Japanese electric locomotive
- BMW 8 Series (E31), a 2-door car built by BMW from 1990 to 1999
- Nimzo-Indian Defence, Leningrad, main line, Encyclopaedia of Chess Openings code
- Damansara–Shah Alam Elevated Expressway, route E31 in Malaysia
- Hiroshima-Kure Road, route E31 in Japan
- Long Win Bus Route E31 in Hong Kong
