= JŽ class 20 =

Class 20
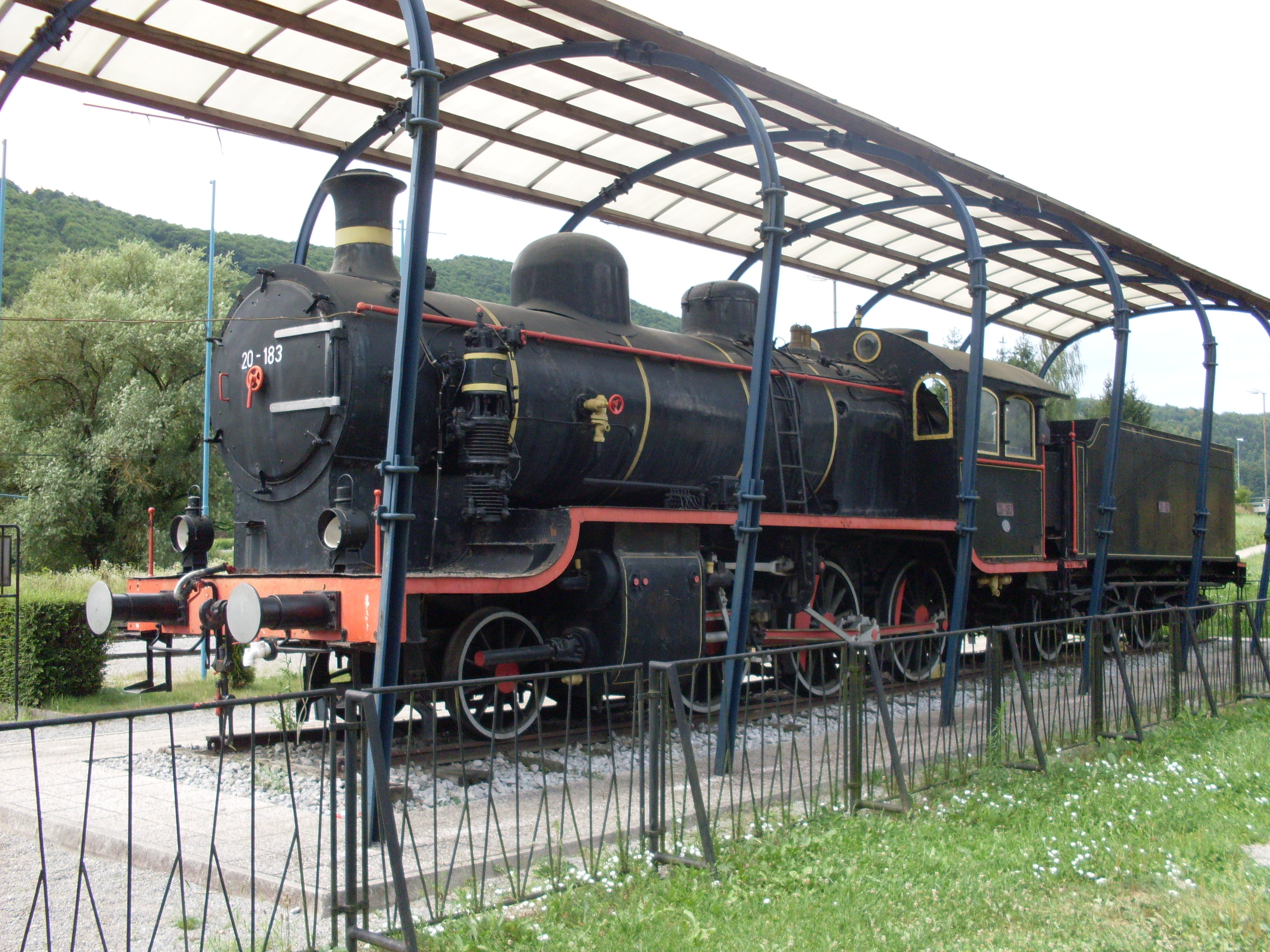
- Class 20 locomotive as a monument in Trebnje
Type and origin
- Power type: Steam
- Builder: Hanomag, Borsig, Henschel, AEG, Krauss
- Serial number: 6001 - 6200, 601 - 620, 860.003, 860.004, 860-006, 860-008, 860-009, 860-011, 860-016, 860.020; From 1933: 20-001 - 20-225; CFO 521–523; SEK 241–243; SDŽ 601–623; Austrian-Hungarian army 860.001–022; SHS 601–613, 615, 617–618, 620, 6001–6200, 860.003–004, 006, 008–009, 011, 016, 020; JDŽ 20-001–225; BDŽ 15.01–22; HSH 20-136, 20-[?] PKP Ti17-1–Ti17-3; NKPS Ti17-1–Ti17-3; CFR 130.909 (ex PKP Ti17-1), 860.005, 007, 010, 012, 015, 017–019; SŽD Ти 17-1
- Build date: 1912-1922
- Total produced: 243
- Number rebuilt: CFO/SM: 3 SEK: 3 (from CFO/SM); SDŽ: 23 k.u.k. HB: 22 (2 from SDŽ); SHS/JDŽ: 225 (17 from SDŽ, 8 from k.u.k. HB); BDŽ: 22 (from JDŽ); HSH: 2 (from JDŽ); PKP: 4 (from k.u.k. HB); NKPS: 3 (from PKP); CFR: 9 (1 from NKPS, 8 from k.u.k. HB); SŽD: 1 (from CFR)
Specifications
- Configuration
  - UIC: 1'C+2'2'
- Gauge: 1,435 mm (4 ft 8 1/2 in)
- Length: 18.82 metres (61.7 ft)
- Loco weight: 54
Performance figures
- Maximum speed: 55–65 kilometres per hour (34–40 mph)
- Power output: 552 kW
Career
- Operators: Yugoslav Railways; Hekurudha Shqiptare
- Withdrawn: ~ 1960 (HSH)

Class 20 was a class of steam locomotives for Yugoslav Railways and other railways built by Hanomag, Borsig and AEG. Krauss and Rheinmetall between 1912 and 1922.

== Albania ==
In 1946, 2 of them came to Albania, 20-132 and 20-136. Around 1960 these two locomotives were taken out of service.

== Preserved ==
- 20-100 (ex SHS 6100) is preserved in Niš, Serbia
- 20-149 (ex SHS 6149) is preserved in Zrenjanin, Serbia
- 20-196 (ex SHS 6196) is preserved in Sombor, Serbia
- 20-184 (ex SHS 6184) is preserved in Jasenovac, Croatia
- 20-183 (ex SHS 6183) is preserved in Trebnje, Slovenia
