= List of European railways =

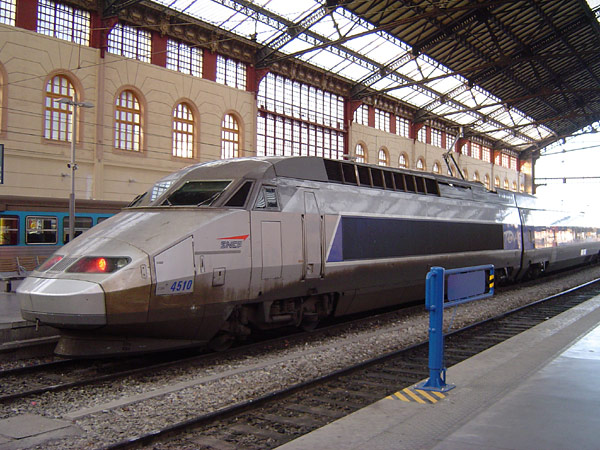
2nd generation TGV of French railways (SNCF).

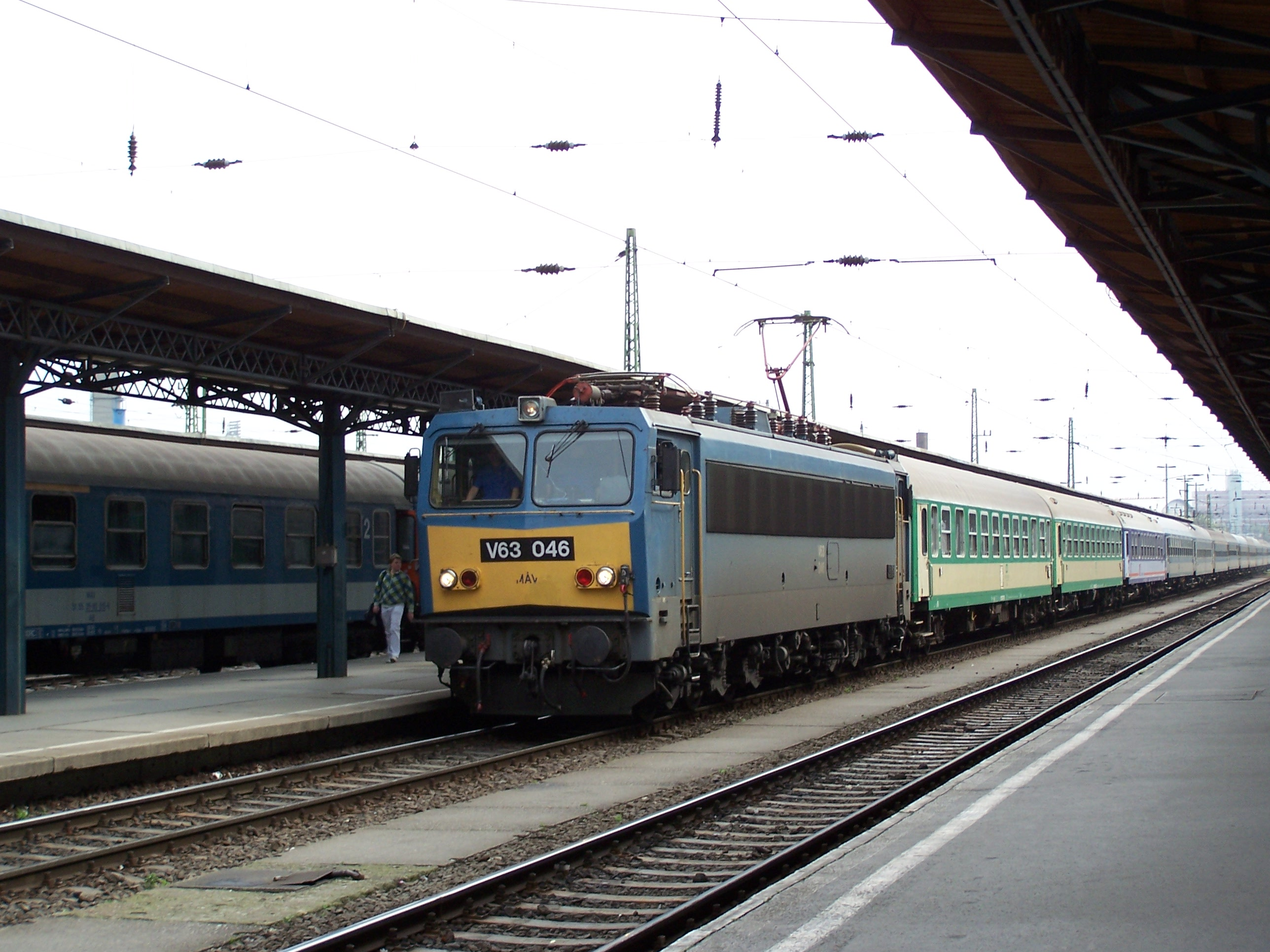
A locomotive of Hungarian State Railway (MÁV).

== National (state) railways ==
- Albania - Hekurudha Shqiptare (HSH)
- Armenia - Հայկական Երկաթուղի փբը (ՀԵ) Haycacan Yerkatuwi (HJe)
- Austria - Österreichische Bundesbahnen (ÖBB)
- Azerbaijan — Azərbaycan Dəmir Yolları (ADY)
- Belarus - Беларуская чыгунка (БЧ)
- Belgium - Nationale Maatschappij der Belgische Spoorwegen (NMBS) - Société Nationale des Chemins de fer Belges (SNCB)
- Bosnia and Herzegovina - Željeznice Bosne i Hercegovine
- Bulgaria - Български държавни железници (Balgarski Darzhavni Zheleznitsi) (БДЖ - BDŻ)
- Croatia - Hrvatske Željeznice (HŽ)
- Cyprus - Cyprus Government Railway (CGR)
- (Czech Republic) Czechia - České dráhy (ČD)
- Denmark - Danske Statsbaner (DSB)
- Estonia - Eesti Raudtee (EVR)
- Finland - Valtion Rautatiet (VR)
- France - Société Nationale des Chemins de fer Français (SNCF)
- (Georgia (country)) Georgia - საქართველოს რკინიგზა (სრ)
- Germany - Deutsche Bahn (DB)
- Greece - Σιδηρόδρομοι Ελλάδος (SE)
- Hungary - Magyar Államvasutak (MÁV)
- (Republic of Ireland) Ireland - Iarnród Éireann (IÉ)
- Italy - Ferrovie dello Stato (FS) - Trenitalia
- Kazakhstan - Kazakhstan Temir Zholy (KTŽ)
- Latvia - Latvijas dzelzceļš (LDZ)
- Liechtenstein - Zahnradbahn Honau–Lichtenstein (ZHB)
- Lithuania - Lietuvos Geležinkeliai (LTG)
- Luxembourg - Société Nationale des Chemins de Fer Luxembourgeois (CFL)
- Moldova - Calea Ferată din Moldova (CFM)
- Monaco - Monaco-Monte Carlo Metro
- Montenegro - Željeznica Crne Gore (ŽCG)
- Netherlands - Nederlandse Spoorwegen (NS)
- North Macedonia - Македонски Железници (Makedonski Železnici)(МЖ - MŽ)
- Norway - Vygruppen (Vy)
- Poland - Polskie Koleje Państwowe (PKP)
- Portugal - Comboios de Portugal (CP)
- Romania - Căile Ferate Române (CFR)
- Russia - Российские Железные Дороги (Rossiyskiye Zhyelyezniye Dorogi) (РЖД - RŻD)
- San Marino - Ferrovia Rimini-San Marino (SFVET)
- Serbia - Železnice Srbije (ŽS)
- Slovakia - Železničná spoločnosť Slovensko, a. s. (ZSSK)
- Slovenia - Slovenske železnice (SŽ)
- Spain - Renfe
- Switzerland - Schweizerische Bundesbahnen (SBB) / Chemins de fer fédéraux suisses (CFF) / Ferrovie federali svizzere (FFS) / Viafiers federalas svizras (VFS)
- Sweden - SJ AB (SJ)
- Turkey - Türkiye Cumhuriyeti Devlet Demiryolları İşletmesi (TCDD)
- Ukraine - Укрзалізниця (Ukrzaliznytsia) (УЗ - UZ)
- United Kingdom - British Rail (BR) (privatized 1997) - Northern Ireland Railways (Northern Ireland Only) (NIR)
- Vatican City - Ferrovie del Vaticano

== Regional and private railways ==
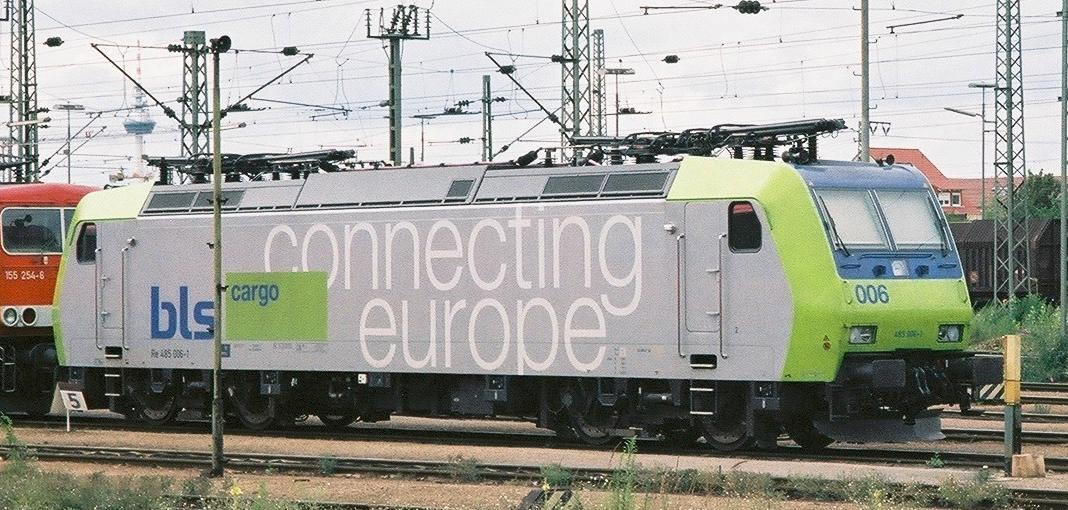
Swiss BLS BLS Re4 class electric locomotive.

- Austria
  - Graz-Köflacher Eisenbahn (GKB)
  - Salzburger Lokalbahn (SLB)
  - Steiermärkische Landesbahnen (STLB)
  - Zillertalbahn (ZB)
  - Győr-Sopron-Ebenfurti Vasút (GySEV) – Raab-Oedenburg-Ebenfurth-Eisebahnen (ROeEE)
- France
  - Eurostar (merged with former Thalys)
- Belgium
  - Eurostar (merged with former Thalys)
- Czech Republic
  - NH-TRANS, a.s.
  - RegioJet
  - Železniční společnost Tanvald
  - Plzeňská dráha
  - Železnici Desná (ŽD)
  - Leo Express
- Denmark
  - Danish railways - Nordjyske Jernbaner
  - De sjællandske Statsbaner
  - Hohenzollerische Landesbahn AG (HzL)
  - Vogtlandbahn (VB)
- Germany
  - Eurostar (former Thalys)
  - Flixtrain
- Hungary
  - Győr-Sopron-Ebenfurti Vasút (GySEV) – Raab-Oedenburg-Ebenfurth-Eisebahnen (ROeEE)
- Italy
  - Ferrovia Circumetnea (FCE)
  - Ferrovie Nord Milano (FNM)
  - Ferrovia Alta Valtellina (FAV)
  - Ferrovia Valle Seriana (FVS)
  - Società Nazionale Ferrovie e Tramvie (Brescia Iseo Edolo)
  - Ferrovia Valle Brembana
  - Ferrovia Mantova Peschiera
  - Ferrovia Intra Omegna (SAVTE)
  - Ferrovie Reggiane (CCFR)
  - Ferrovie Modenesi
  - Ferrovie Padane
  - Ferrovia Parma Suzzara
  - Ferrovia Suzzara Ferrara (FSF)
  - Ferrovia Casalecchio Vignola (FCV)
  - Ferrovia Torino Ceres (FTC)
  - Ferrovia Canavesana
  - Ferrovie Elettriche Biellesi
  - Ferrovia Rezzato Vobarno
  - Ferrovia Piacenza Bettola (SIFT)
  - Ferrovia Lana Postal
  - Ferrovia Transatesina - Bolzano Caldaro
  - Ferrovia Bribano Agordo
  - Ferrovia Udine Cividale (FUC)
  - Ferrovia Adria Mestre
  - Ferrovia Centrale Umbra (FCU)
  - Ferrovia Siena-Buonconvento-Monte Antico
  - Ferrovia Sangritana
  - Ferrovie siciliane
  - Ferrovie del Sud Est (FSE)
  - La Ferroviaria Italiana
  - Ferrovie del Gargano
  - Ferrovie del Nord Barese
  - Ferrovia Alifana
  - Ferrovia Cumana
  - Ferrovia Benevento-Cancello
  - Ferrovia Avellino-Rocchetta Sant'Antonio
  - Ferrovie Appulo Lucane
  - Ferrovia Genova Casella
  - Ferrovia delle Dolomiti
  - Ferrovia Cogne Acquefredde
  - Ferrovia Stresa Mottarone (closed in 1963)
  - Ferrovia Intra Premeno
  - Ferrovia Trento-Malè
  - Ferrovia della Val di Fiemme
  - Ferrovia del Renon
  - Ferrovia Alto Pistoiese
  - Ferrovia Roma Fiuggi Alatri Frosinone
  - Ferrovia Spoleto Norcia
  - Ferrovia Circumvesuviana
  - Ferrovie Calabro Lucane
  - Ferrovia Circumetnea
  - Strade Ferrate Secondarie della Sardegna
  - Ferrovie Complementari Sarde
  - Ferrovie Meridionali Sarde
  - Strade Ferrate Sarde
  - Ferrovie della Sardegna
  - Ferrovia Siracusa Ragusa Vizzini
  - Ferrovia Basso Sebino
  - Ferrovia Val d'Orcia
  - Ferrovia Valmorea
  - Ferrovia Domodossola-Locarno
  - Sad Trasporto Locale S.p.a.
  - Società Subalpina Imprese Ferroviarie (SSIF)
  - Nuovo Trasporto Viaggiatori
- Netherlands
  - Eurostar (former Thalys)
- Norway
  - Tågkompaniet AB (TK)
- Poland
  - Arriva RP
  - Lower Silesian Railways
  - Masovian Railways
  - Silesian Railways
  - Greater Poland Railways
  - Lesser Poland Railways
  - Łódź Agglomeration Railway
  - PKP Intercity
  - Polregio
  - Rapid Urban Railway (Warsaw)
  - Tricity Rapid Urban Railway
  - Warsaw Commuter Railway
- Romania
  - Regio Călători
  - Interregional Călători
  - Softrans
  - Transferoviar Călători (T.F.C.)
  - Astra Trans Carpatic
- Spain
  - Canfranero
  - Cercanías
  - El ferrocarril de la Minero Siderurgica de Ponferrada (MSP)
  - Ferrocarril Santander-Mediterráneo
  - Ferrocarril Vasco-Asturiano
  - La Robla railway
  - Ferrocarril de Langreo
  - Ferrocarril del Almanzora
  - La línea de ferrocarril Baeza-Utiel
  - Metro de Palma de Mallorca
  - Ferrocarriles Secundarios de Castilla
  - Tren Camino de Santiago
  - Trenet de la Marina
  - Alta Velocidad (LAV)
  - Ferrocarril suburbano de Carabanchel
  - Ferrocarrils de la Generalitat de Catalunya (FGC)
  - Ouigo España
  - Iryo
  - Intermobilidad de Levante
- Sweden
  - Bergkvist Svets & Mek Järnväg AB (BSMJ)
  - Sydvästen AB (SV)
  - Tågkompaniet AB (TK)
  - Flixtrain
- Switzerland
  - Appenzeller Bahnen (AB)
  - BLS AG (BLS)
  - Berner Oberland Bahn (BOB)
  - BVZ Zermatt-Bahn (BVZ)
  - Domodossola–Locarno railway (Centovallina)
  - CISALPINO AG
  - Furka Oberalp Bahn (FO)
  - Glacier Express (GE)
  - GoldenPass Line (GPL)
  - Gornergratbahn (GB)
  - Jungfraubahn (JB)
  - Chemins de fer du Jura (CJ)
  - Transports de Martigny et Régions SA
  - Matterhorn Gotthard Bahn (MGB)
  - Montreux–Lenk im Simmental line
  - Regionalverkehr Bern-Solothurn (RBS)
  - Rhätische Bahn (RB)
  - Südostbahn (SOB)
  - Voralpen Express (VAE)
  - Transports Publics du Chablais (TPC)
  - Wilhelm Tell Express (WTE)
  - Zentralbahn (ZB)
- United Kingdom (at March 2024)
  - Arriva Rail London
  - Avanti West Coast
  - Caledonian Sleeper
  - Chiltern Railways
  - Colas Rail
  - CrossCountry
  - DB Cargo UK
  - DCRail
  - Direct Rail Services
  - East Midlands Railway
  - Elizabeth line
  - Freightliner
  - GB Railfreight
  - Govia Thameslink Railway
  - Grand Central
  - Greater Anglia
  - Great Western Railway
  - Heathrow Express
  - Hull Trains
  - Locomotive Services Limited
  - London North Eastern Railway
  - Lumo
  - Merseyrail
  - Translink (Northern Ireland)
  - Northern Trains
  - Rail Operations Group
  - Riviera Trains
  - ScotRail
  - Southeastern
  - South Western Railway
  - TransPennine Express
  - Transport for Wales
  - Vintage Trains
  - West Coast Railways
  - West Midlands Trains

== Regional passenger and cargo railways ==
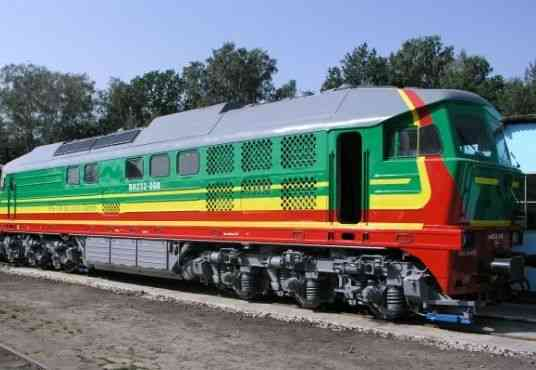
Polish Private Railway Przedsiębiorstwo Transportu Kolejowego Holding SA Zabrze-Locomotive typ BR232.

- Hungary
  - CER Vasúti Zrt
  - Magyar Magánvasút ZRt. (MMV)
  - Mátrai Erőmű Zrt.
  - MÁV-Hajdú Vasútépítő Kft.
  - Train Hungary Magánvasút Kft
- Romania
  - Transferoviar Grup

== Urban, municipal and local railways ==
- Armenia
  - Yerevan metro
- Austria
  - Insbrucker Verkehrsbetriebe (IVB)
  - Linzer Lokalbahn (LLB)
  - Wiener Lokalbahnen AG (WLB)
- Germany
  - Karlsruher Verkehrsverbund (KVB)
- Hungary
  - Budapesti Helyiérdekű Vasút (BHÉV)
- Italy
  - Ferrovia Roma Ostia Lido
  - Ferrovia Roma Viterbo
- Poland
  - Szybka Kolej Miejska
  - PKP Szybka Kolej Miejska w Trójmieście
  - Warszawska Kolej Dojazdowa
- Spain
  - Metro de Madrid
  - Metro de Barcelona
  - Metro de Granada
  - Metro de Málaga
  - Metro de Santander
  - Metro de Sevilla
  - Metro de Valencia
- Russia
  - Moscow metro
  - Saint Petersburg metro
  - Yekaterinburg metro
- Ukraine
  - Kyiv metro
  - Kharkiv metro
  - Dnipro metro

== Cargo railways ==
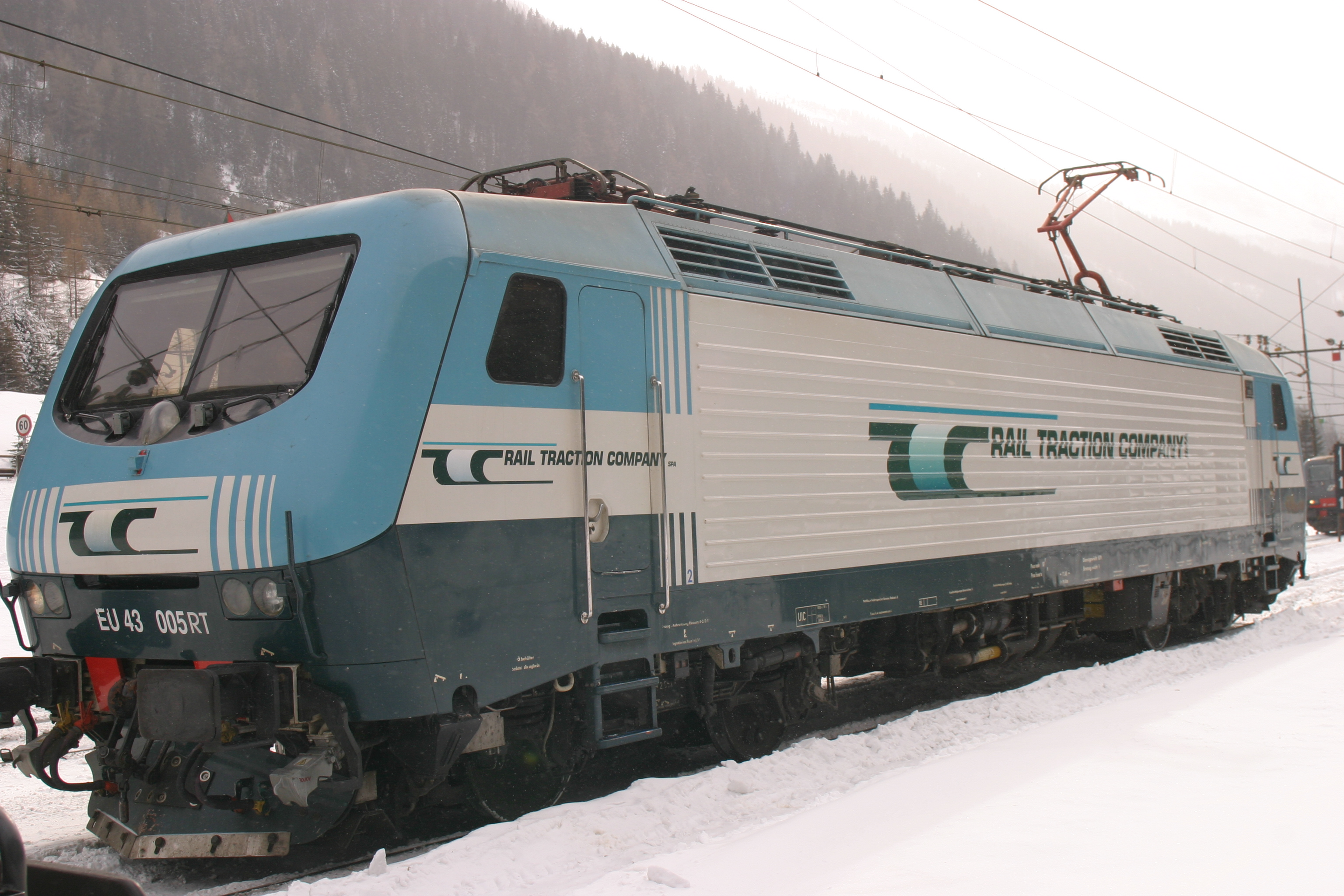

- Austria
  - Rail Cargo Austria
  - Logistik- und Transport GmbH (LTE)
- Germany, Netherlands, Denmark, Switzerland, Italy
  - Railion
- Germany, France, Luxembourg and Switzerland
  - Rhealys
- Germany, Netherlands
  - Bentheimer Eisenbahn
- Slovakia
  - Železnična spoločnost' Cargo Slovakia (ZSCS)
- Slovenia
  - Adria Transport
- Hungary
  - MÁV Cargo
- Italy
  - FS Cargo
  - Rail Traction Company
- Norway
  - CargoNet
- Poland
  - Captrain Polska
  - Cemet
  - CTL Express
  - CTL Kargo
  - CTL Logistics
  - CTL Rail
  - CTL Reggio
  - DB Schenker Rail Coaltran
  - DB Cargo Polska
  - DB Cargo Spedkol
  - Dolkom
  - DLA
  - Ecco Rail
  - Euronaft Trzebinia
  - Extrail
  - Freightliner PL
  - GATX Rail Poland
  - Hagans Logistic
  - Kolej Bałtycka
  - KP Kotlarnia
  - PHU Lokomotiv
  - LW Bogdanka
  - Majkoltrans
  - Orion Kolej
  - Orlen Rail
  - PKP Cargo
  - PKP LHS
  - Pol-Miedź Trans
  - PNUIK Kraków
  - PPM-T
  - PRK Kraków
  - Koltar
  - PUK Kolprem
  - Qemetica Cargo
  - Rail Polska
  - S&K Train Transport
  - SKPL Cargo
  - STK
  - TS Opole
  - Torpol
  - Transchem
  - Wiskol
  - X Train
  - ZIK
  - Tabor
  - JSW Logistics
  - ZRK DOM
- Romania
  - CFR Marfa
  - Grup Feroviar Român
  - GP Rail Cargo
  - Transferoviar Grup
  - Vest Trans Rail
  - Via Terra Spedition
  - Cargo Trans Vagon
  - Constantin Grup
  - DB Cargo Romania
  - Rail Cargo Carrier- România
  - Tehnotrans Feroviar
  - CER-Fersped/EP Rail
  - Unicom Tranzit
  - Tim Rail Cargo
  - LTE-Rail Romania
  - PSP Cargo Group- Romania
  - Express Forwarding
  - Rofersped
- Sweden
  - Green Cargo

== Infrastructural and track railways ==
- Austria
  - ÖBB-Infrastruktur Betrieb AG
- Belgium
  - Infrabel
- Bulgaria
  - Национална компания Железопътна инфраструктура
- Czech Republic
  - Správa železnic (SŽ)
- France
  - SNCF réseau
- Slovakia
  - Železnice Slovenskej republiky (ŽSR)
- Poland
  - PKP Polskie Linie Kolejowe
- Romania
  - CFR SA
- Sweden
  - Banverket
- United Kingdom
  - Network Rail
