= HSH Class 72 =

Class 72
Type and origin
- Power type: Steam
- Builder: Maschinenfabrik Esslingen
- Order number: 4472
- Total produced: 1
Specifications
- Configuration
  - Whyte: 0-6-0T
  - UIC: C't
- Gauge: 1,435 mm (4 ft 8 1/2 in)
Career
- Operators: Hekurudha Shqiptare
- First run: 1941
- Withdrawn: before 2000

Class 72 was a single steam locomotive of Hekurudha Shqiptare, the railway company of Albania. The locomotive was built by Maschinenfabrik Esslingen for Dynamit Nobel initially and came to Albania later.
