= HSH Class T211.0 =

Class T211.0
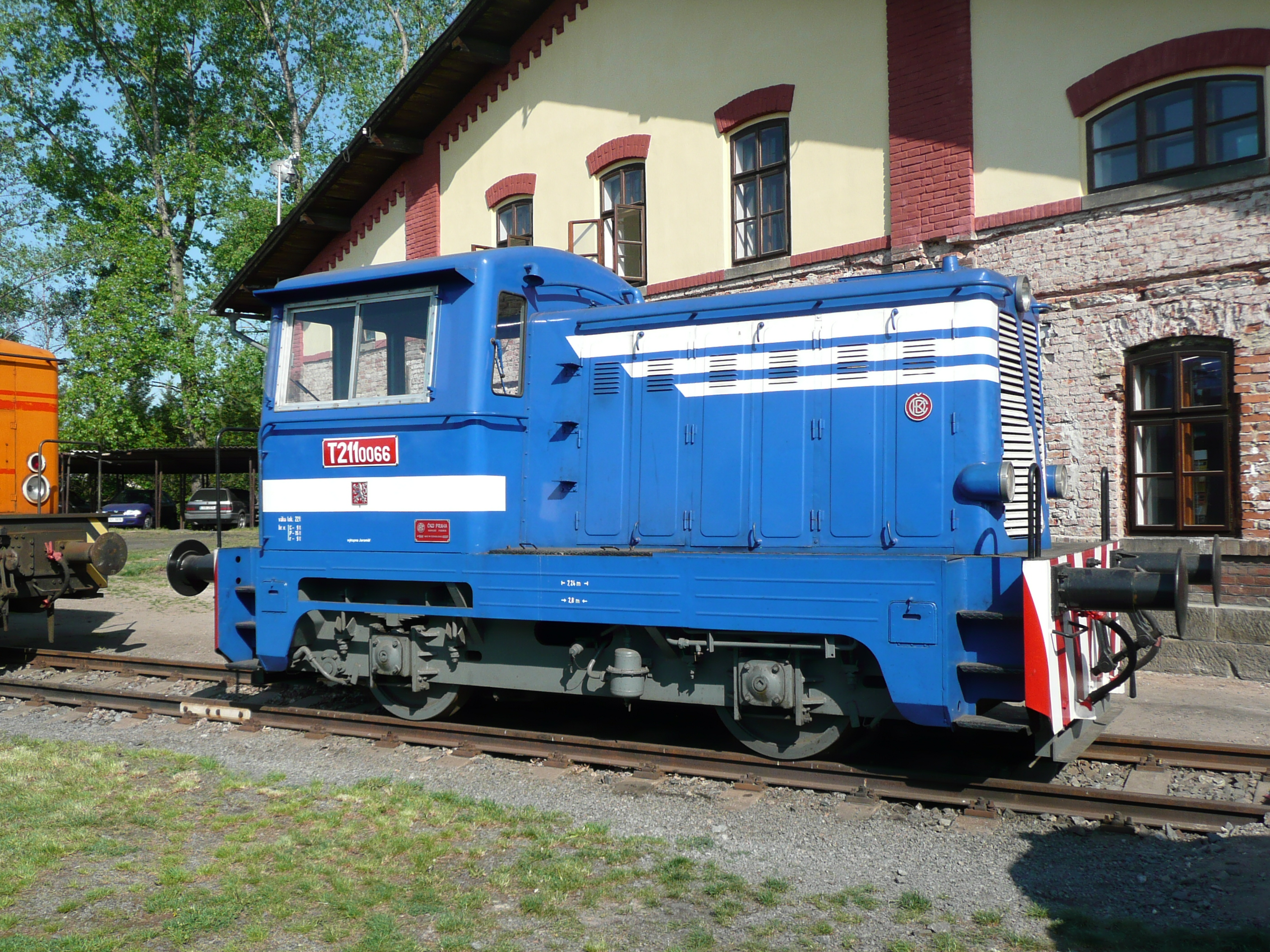
- Similar shunter locomotive preserved in a museum in Jaroměř.
Type and origin
- Power type: Diesel
- Builder: ČKD
- Order number: 454-455
- Model: Shunter locomotive
- Total produced: 2/4
Specifications
- Configuration
  - UIC: B'
- Gauge: 1,435 mm (4 ft 8 1/2 in)
- Wheel diameter: 1.00 m
- Length: 7.24 m
- Width: 2.6 m
- Height: 3.348 m
- Loco weight: 22 t
- Engine type: Tatra T111A
Performance figures
- Maximum speed: 40 km/h
- Power output: 118 kW
Career
- Operators: Hekurudha Shqiptare

Class T211 was a series of diesel locomotive, used Hekurudha Shqiptare, the railway company of Albania. Some sources said 4 locomotives were delivered. However, only two locomotives were ever seen in Albania. The locomotives are almost identical to the T-211's delivered to ČSD.
