= Seibu Class E851 =

Japanese locomotive class

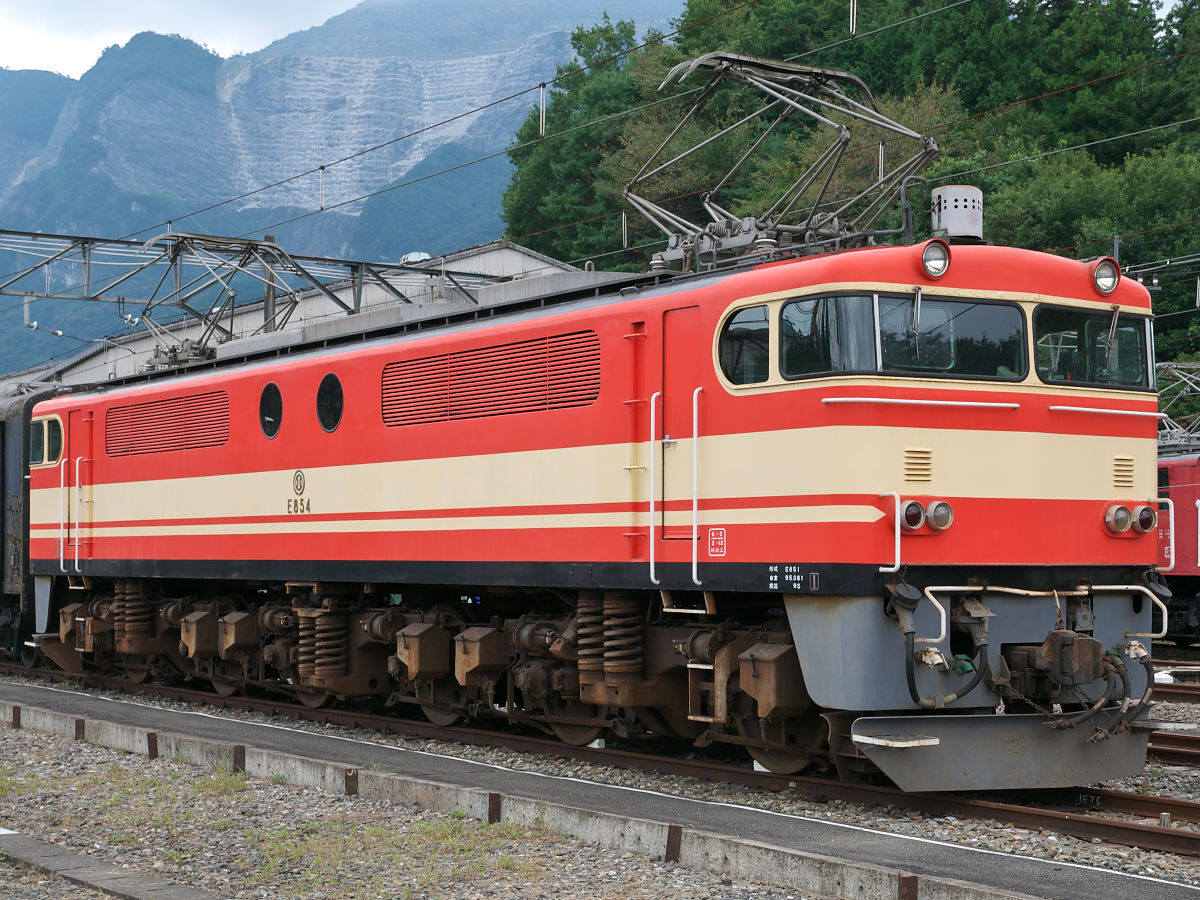
- Preserved Seibu Class E851 electric locomotive No. E854 on display at Yokoze Depot Open Day in October 2010
Type and origin
- Power type: Electric
- Builder: Mitsubishi
- Build date: 1969
Specifications
- Configuration
  - UIC: Bo-Bo-Bo
- Gauge: 1,067 mm (3 ft 6 in)
- Electric system/s: 1,500 V DC
- Traction motors: DC
Performance figures
- Power output: 2,550 kW
Career
- Operators: Seibu Railway
- Number in class: 4
- Disposition: Withdrawn

The Class E851 (E851形) was a class of four DC electric locomotives operated by the private railway operator Seibu Railway in Japan between 1969 and 1996.

Built in 1969 by Mitsubishi to haul 1,000-tonne cement trains, the design was based on the JNR Class EF65 and used bogies similar to those used on the JNR Class EF81 locomotives.

From 30 November 1990, the discontinuation of freight services to Sayamagaoka eliminated the need for double-heading, and the end of all Seibu freight services from 7 March 1996 saw the E851s become surplus to requirements. Final farewell Sayonara runs were organized in May 1996 hauling JR 12-series passengers coaches from Tokorozawa to Yokoze.

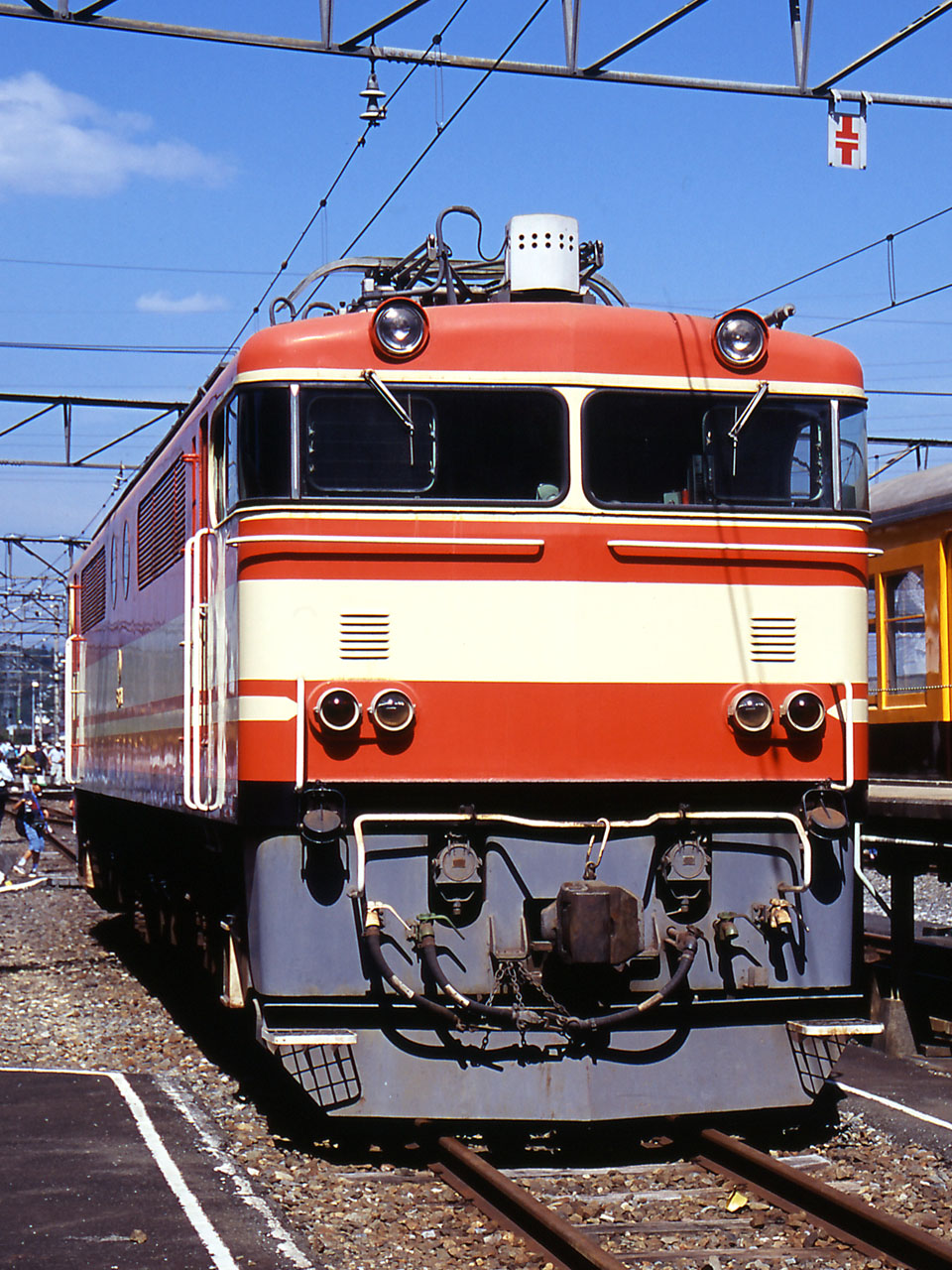
Seibu E854 at Yokose

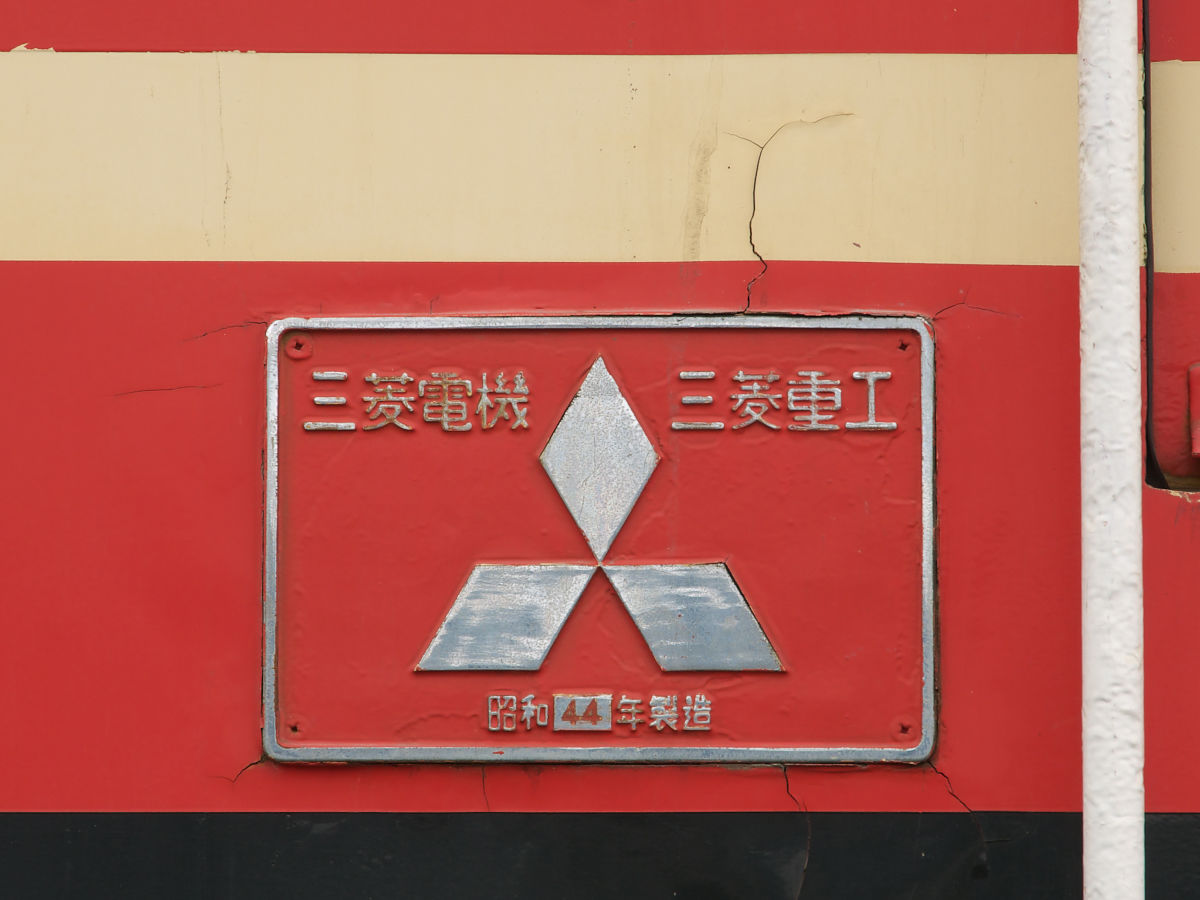
Seibu Railway E854 builder's plate

Locomotive E854 remains preserved at Yokoze Depot, but the other three locomotives in the class were cut up.

== See also ==
- Seibu Class E31
