= Bavarian BB II =

Mallet type, saturated steam locomotives

Bavarian BB II DRG Class 98.7
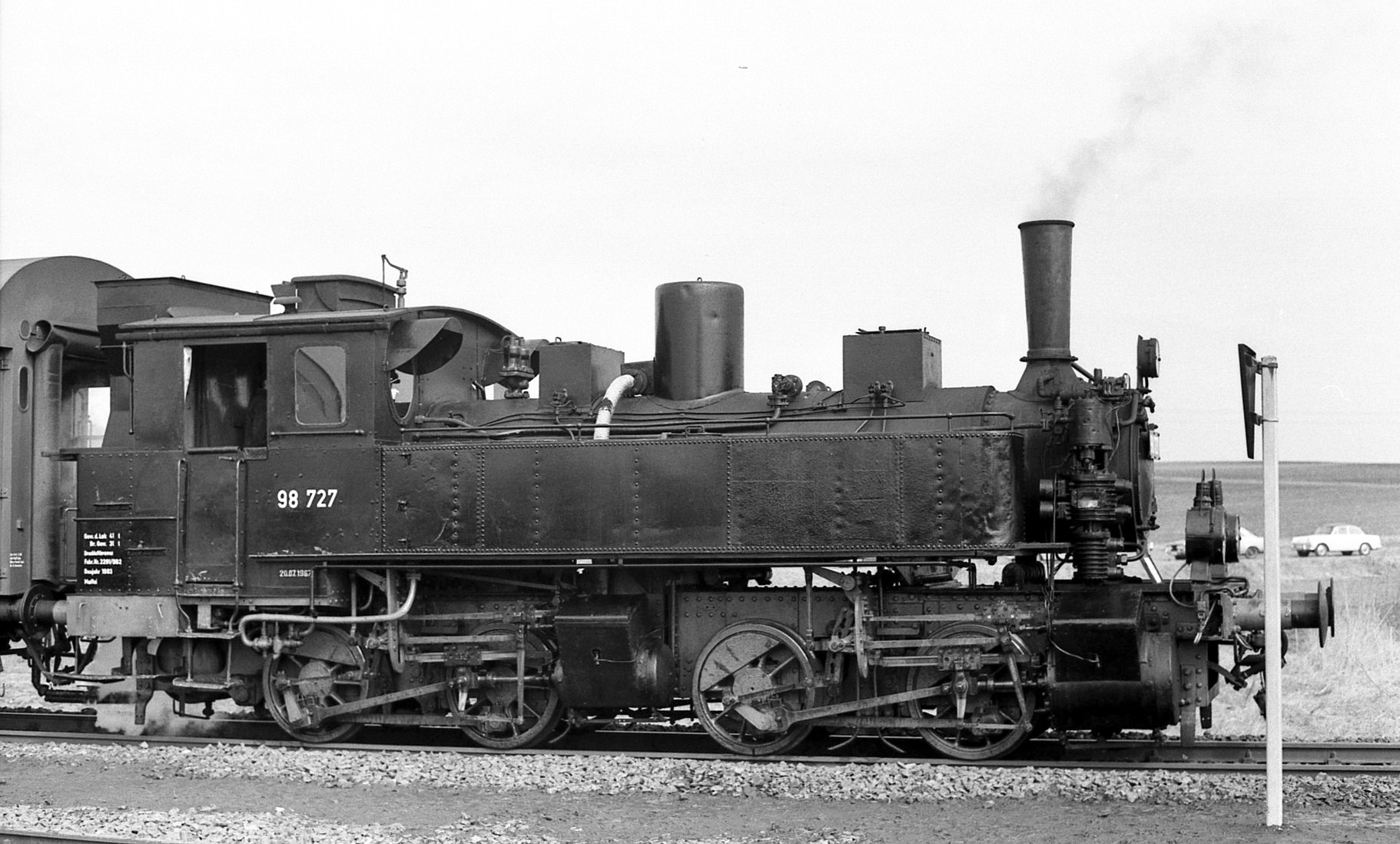
- DRG 98 727 in Sonderhofen, March 1973
Type and origin
- Builder: Maffei
- Build date: 1899–1908
- Total produced: 31
Specifications
- Configuration
  - Whyte: 0-4-4-0T
- Gauge: 1,435 mm (4 ft 8 1/2 in)
- Driver dia.: 1,006 mm (3 ft 3 1/2 in)
- Length
  - Over beams: 10,010 mm (32 ft 10 in)
- Axle load: 10.7 t (10.5 long tons; 11.8 short tons)
- Adhesive weight: 42.6 t (41.9 long tons; 47.0 short tons)
- Service weight: 42.6 t (41.9 long tons; 47.0 short tons)
- Boiler pressure: 12 kgf/cm^{2} (1,180 kPa; 171 lbf/in^{2})
- Heating surface
  - Firebox: 1.40 m^{2} (15.1 sq ft)
  - Evaporative: 67.70 m^{2} (728.7 sq ft)
- Cylinders: 4, compound
- High-pressure cylinder: 310 mm (12 3/16 in)
- Low-pressure cylinder: 490 mm (19 5/16 in)
- Piston stroke: 530 mm (20 7/8 in)
Performance figures
- Maximum speed: 45 km/h (28 mph)
- Indicated power: 380 PS (279 kW; 375 hp)
Career
- Numbers: K.Bay.Sts.E: 2501–2531; DRG 98 701 – 98 731
- Retired: 1940 (?)

The Bavarian Class BB II engines were Mallet type, saturated steam locomotives in the service of the Royal Bavarian State Railways (Königlich Bayerische Staats-Eisenbahnen).

They were specially designed for branch lines with tight curves and supplied in two series. The first series comprised 29 engines and was built between 1899 and 1903. The other two machines were delivered in 1908 to the state railway and were somewhat longer and heavier than the other locomotives.

Although the Deutsche Reichsbahn-Gesellschaft took over all the vehicles in 1925 as DRG Class 98.7, all bar three were retired during the 1930s due to their unsatisfactory riding performance. The last three engines were used after 1940 as industrial locomotives.

One example, the 98 727, was sold in 1943 to the Regensburg factory of Südzucker AG and was given the operating number 4. It was donated in 1972 to the Darmstadt-Kranichstein Railway Museum (Eisenbahnmuseum Darmstadt-Kranichstein) and is still preserved today.

98 713 was used in Regensburg as well, was exported to Albania in 1943 to be used by Wehrmacht and Hekurudha Shqiptare. Served until 1950 and still could be seen in 1985.

== References and notes ==
- Weisbrod, Manfred; Petznik, Wolfgang (1981). Dampflokomotiven deutscher Eisenbahnen, Baureihe 97–99 (EFA 1.4) (in German) (2nd ed.). Düsseldorf: Alba. pp. 59–61, 194–195. ISBN 3-87094-087-5.
