= Hekurudha Shqiptare =

State-owned operator of Albanian railways

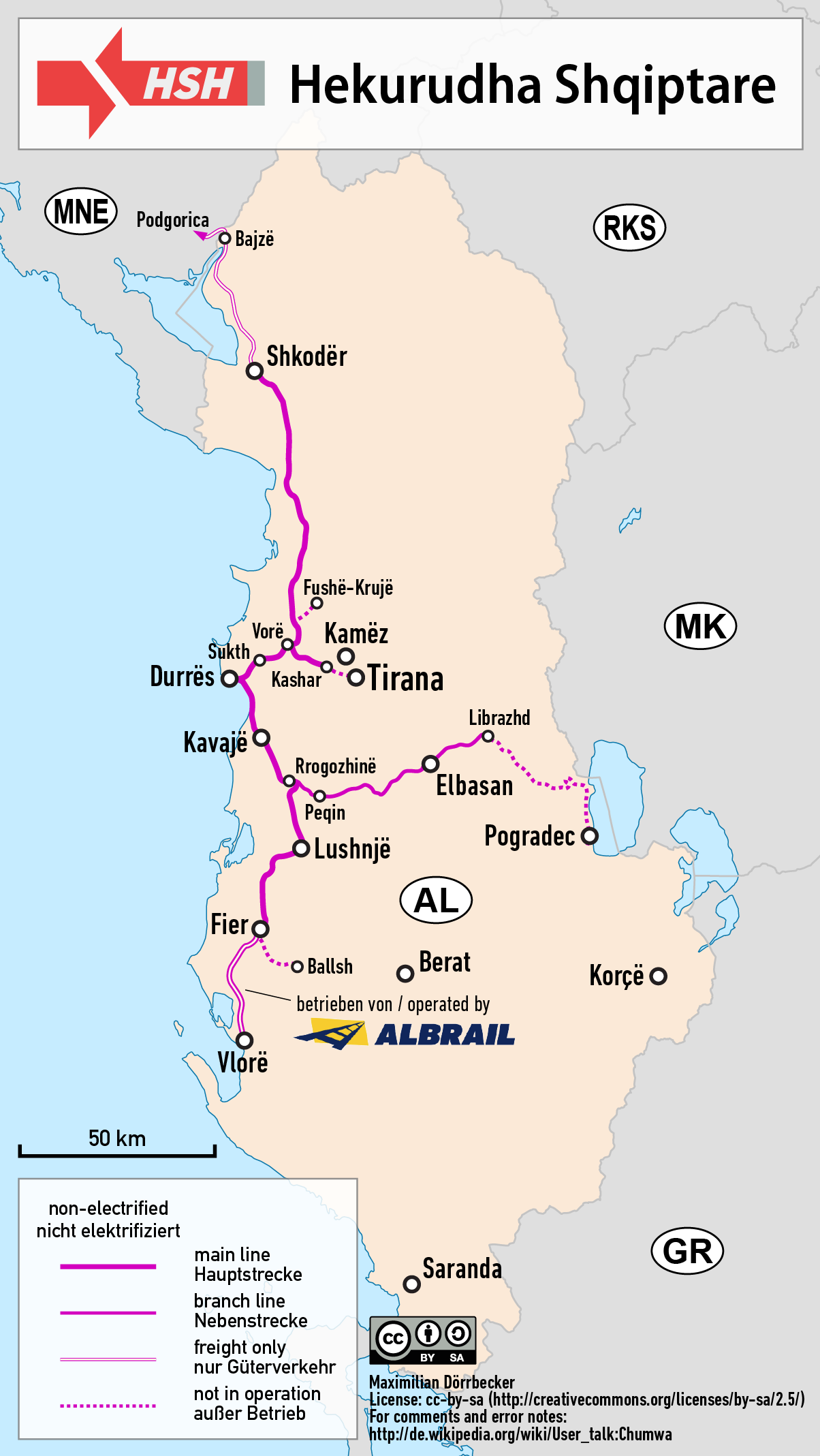
- Historical map of Albanian railways. Most lines now closed.

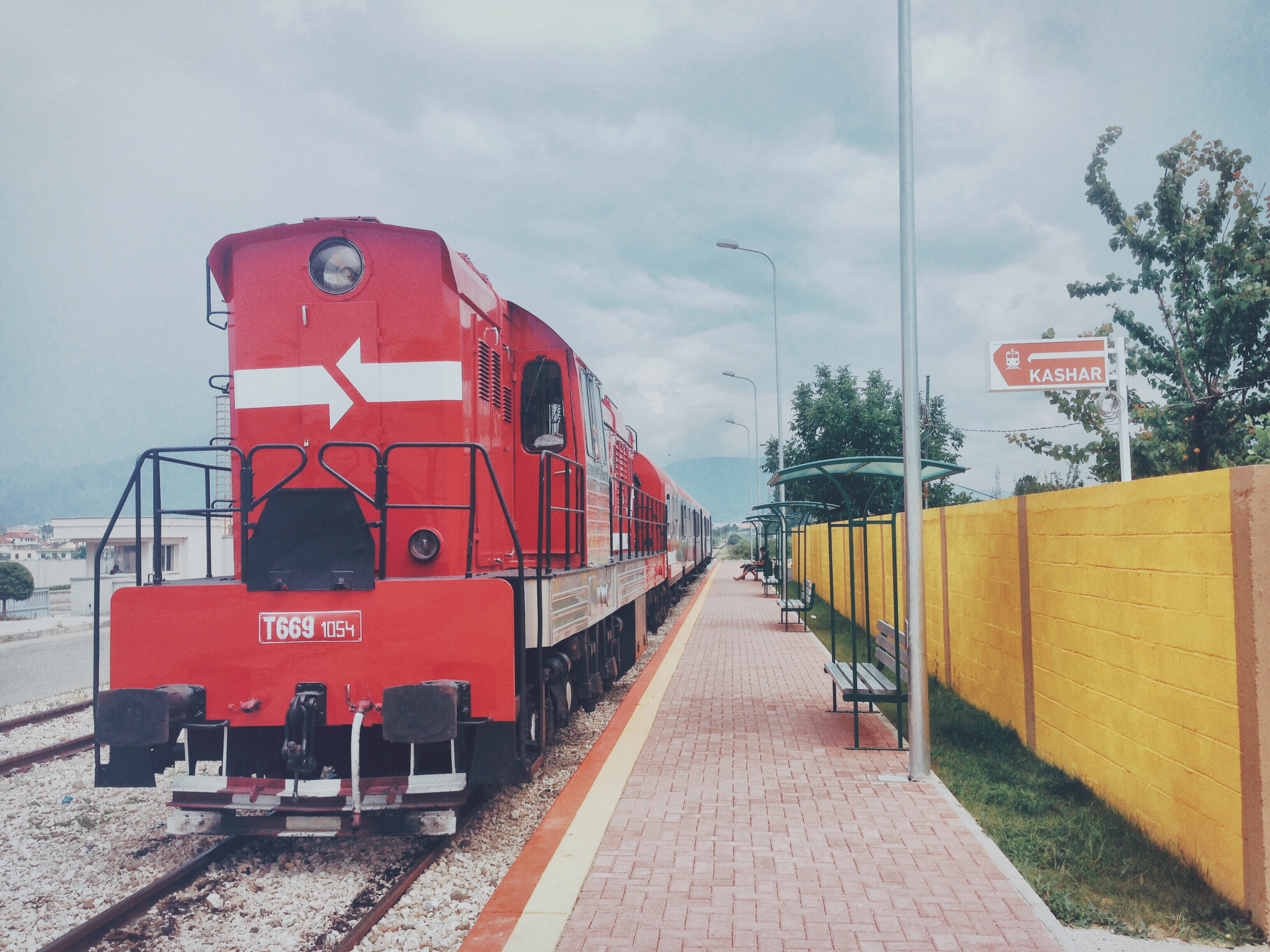
- T-669 Locomotive at Kashar station in 2015 serving Tirana (now closed)

Overview
- Headquarters: Durres Railway Station, Durrës, Albania
- Locale: Albania
- Dates of operation: 1945–

Technical
- Track gauge: 1,435 mm (4 ft 8 1/2 in)

Other
- Website: hekurudha.al

Hekurudha Shqiptare or HSH (Albanian Railways) is the state-owned operator of the Albanian railway system and became a private company in 2005. The system's main passenger terminal was Durrës station, located in the port city of Durrës.

HSH's infrastructure used to run east to Pogradec (up to Librazhd as of 2012), south to Vlorë and north to Shkodër. There was also a branch line to the capital Tirana (up to Kashar, 10 km or 6.2 mi away as of 2015). The network was extended beyond Shkodër in the 1980s into what is now Montenegro, via the Albanian border town of Hani i Hotit. But this section of the system is for freight only. There is also no physical rail connection between Albania and neighbouring Kosovo, North Macedonia, or Greece.

The HSH network was entirely unelectrified, and trains were hauled by Czechoslovak T-669 diesel-electric locomotives. The system was single-track throughout, with passing loops at various points. Second-hand passenger rolling stock from Germany's DB and former DR, Italy's FS, Austria's ÖBB, and Poland's PKP was used. Trains suffered internal and external damage from vandalism, including the stoning of locomotives and carriages. Further problems arose from landslide damage to sections of the track or because lengths of rail were stolen for iron scrap.

The system is barely surviving with an Elbasan–Durrës train and a Shkodër–Laç train, although rehabilitation is currently underway on the Durrës–Tiranë railway, with other projects in various stages of planning.

The Minister of Infrastructure and Energy also focused on two other important projects, such as Vora-Hani i Hotit line, and the Durës-Rrogozhinë line as part of the VIII Corridor project, projects that will be implemented thanks to the support of the European Union.

== Network rehabilitation ==
=== Tirana–Rinas–Durres line ===
Construction work to upgrade the Durrës–Tiranë line and to link it with Rinas Airport with electric-powered trains started in 2021 with a loan from EBRD. Works are expected to finish in 2027.

From Tirana station to the Tirana International Airport, the travel time is expected to be reduced to 12 minutes, with three stops, while Tirana-Durrës is estimated at 22 minutes, with eight stops.

=== Durrës–Rrogozhina line modernization ===
The Government of Albania and the European Investment Bank have signed an agreement for a EU financial package of EUR 90.5 million for the reconstruction of Durrës – Rrogozhina railway. An agreement was signed on April 8, 2025, during High Representative for Foreign Affairs and Security Policy and European Commission Vice-President Kaja Kallas’ official visit to Albania.

=== Vorë–Hani i Hotit line modernization ===
Reconstruction works on the Vorë–Hani i Hotit railway line, Albania’s only international rail connection, are being carried out to modernise and electrify the 120 km of track between Vorë and the Montenegrin border, enabling passenger trains to operate at speeds of up to 100 km/h and significantly improving freight transport. With an estimated investment of €356 million, the rehabilitation forms part of the Western Balkans Economic and Investment Plan and represents an indicative extension of the Mediterranean TEN-T Core Network into the region.

The works include track upgrades, electrification, the renovation of 12 stations, and the construction of a new freight station at Lezhë 2, alongside safety measures such as secured level crossings and service roads. The project is co-financed by EU grants through the Western Balkans Investment Framework, together with loans from the European Investment Bank and the European Bank for Reconstruction and Development.

=== Proposed Pristina–Durrës line ===
Approval was given by the Albanian and Kosovo governments in 2021 to a feasibility study of a Pristina–Durrës route to be undertaken in 2023. The initial findings are now being developed into a full plan for the track.

== Passenger services ==
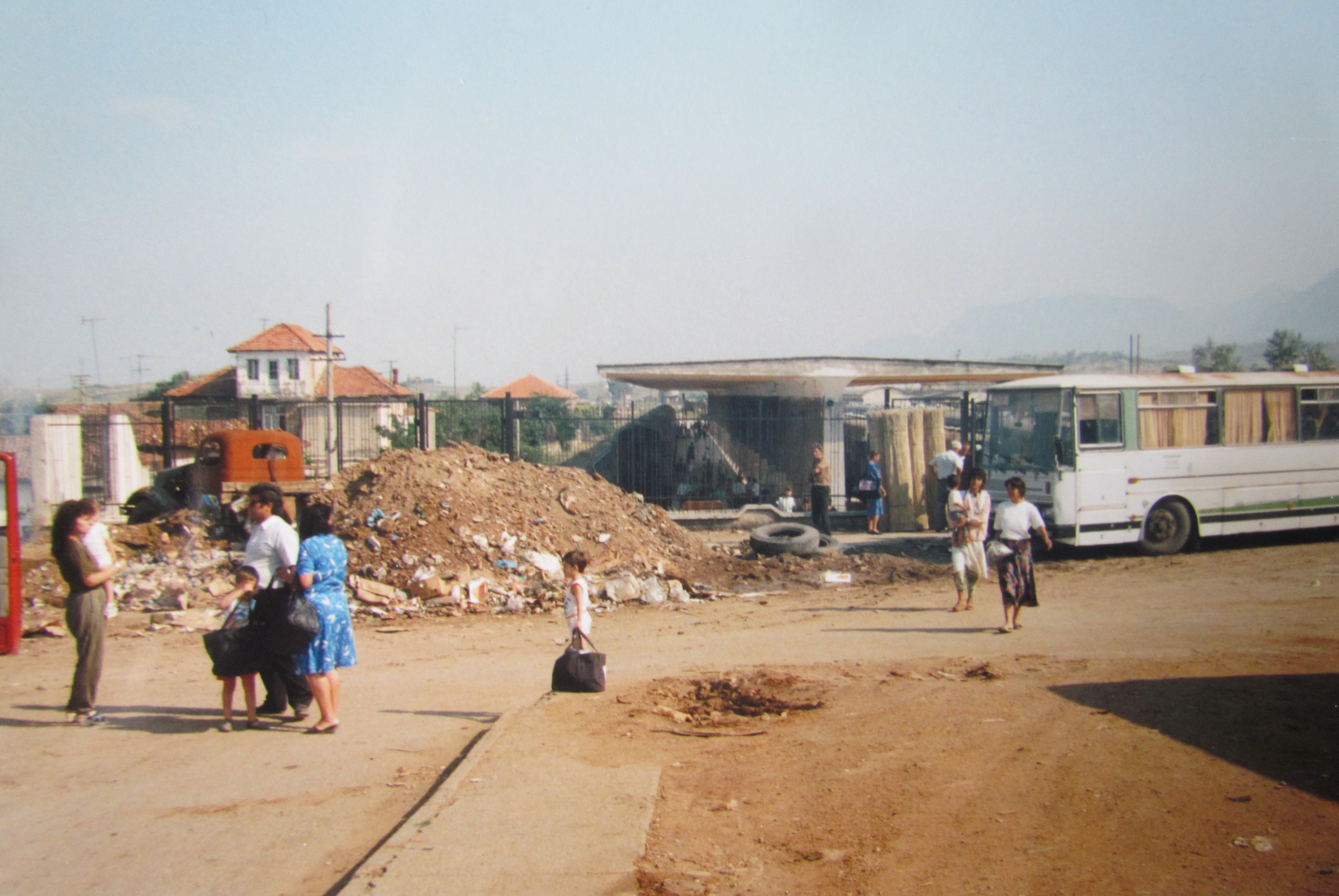
Former Tirana Station, 1995

In 2015, some rail stations and rolling stock along the Durres-Tirane line were renovated and adopted a red and white livery. The scenic Librazhd-Pogradec line was closed for passenger traffic in 2012. The stored locomotives and carriages from Prrenjas are being moved to Elbasan. As a result, this section may be dismantled, as it doesn't link any major cities.

There are several freight-only branch lines. Occasional freight trains may run between Podgorica and Shkodër and between Durrës and the oil refinery at Ballsh. The Tirana-Shkodër line is closed, except for the Durrës Elbasan train and a section between Shkodër and Lac.

== System map ==
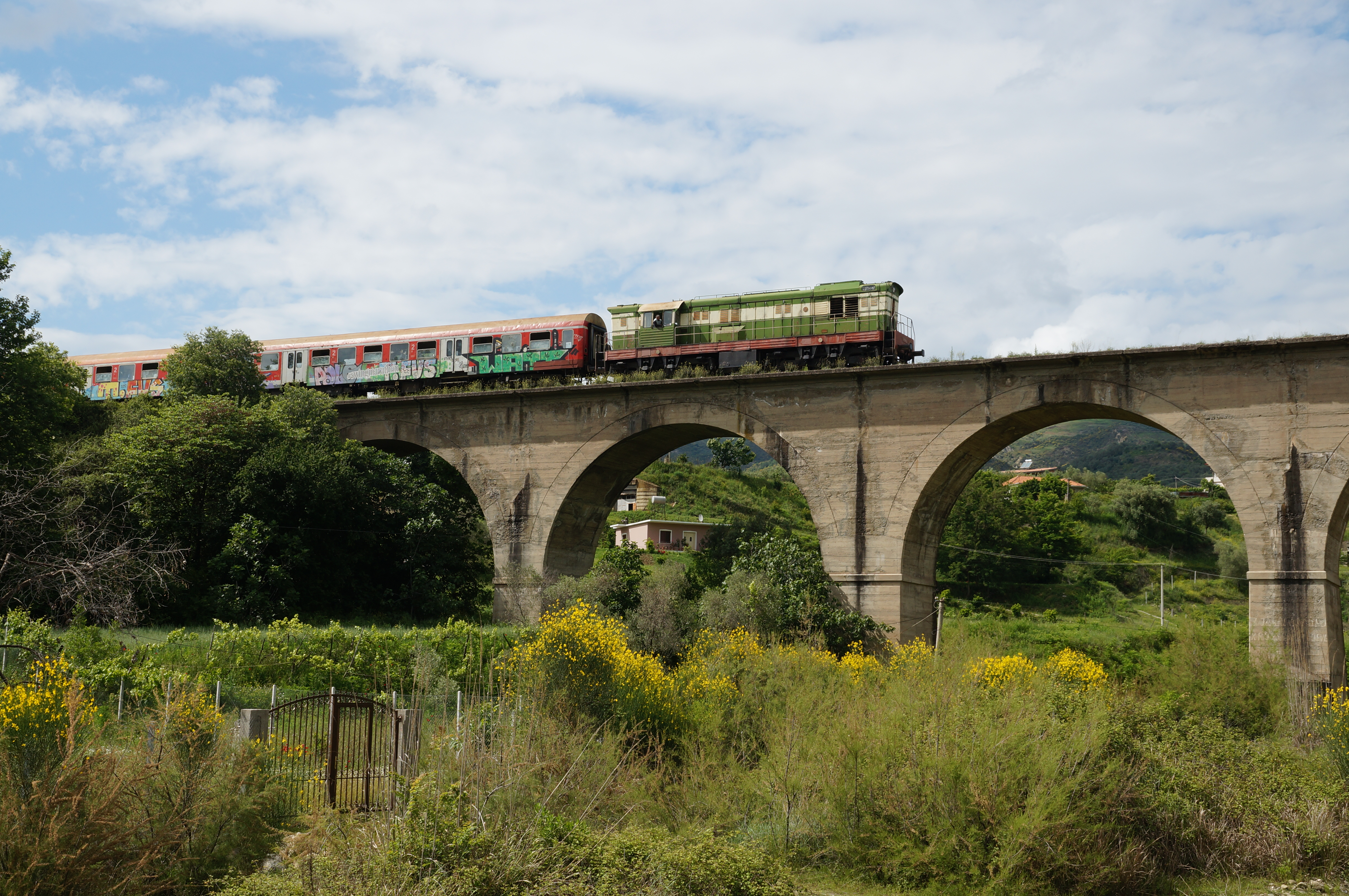
HSH train in Albania, 2019

== Rolling stock ==
=== Locomotives ===
Class	Image	Type	Number	Remarks	Built
BB II 98.713		B'B n4vt	1	Former 98.713 (factory number 2178) built by Maffei. Arrived in 1943, after being used as a factory work locomotive at Messerschmitt in Regensburg. Travelled to Albania with the Wehrmacht. Out of service since 1950. Maximum speed 45 km/h, length 10.010 mm. Status: scrapped	1901
Class 56.3400		1'D h2 Steam locomotive	5	A gift from Soviet Union, this former Austrian rolling stock was a trophy from the WOII and arrived from Hungary in Albania in 1946. Former kkStB class 270, later BBÖ 270.110/56.3408 (factory number 2602), 270.117/56.3415(2609), 270.227/56.3457 (2723) & 270.308/56.3496 (2826) built by WLF Floridsdorf. In 1952, a fifth locomotive arrived (ex 270.180/56.3445, factory number 2672) Status: scrapped	1921
Class 20		Steam locomotive	2	A gift from Soviet Union, this former Yugoslavian/Serbian rolling stock was a trophy from the WOII and arrived from Skopje (Bulgaria during WW2) to Albania in 1946. Former Serbian State Railways SDŽ 20.132 (BDŽ 15.18) and possible 20.136 (BDŽ 15.19). Originally built by Hanomag with factory number 10028 and 10032 Status: scrapped	1932
Class 31		Steam locomotive	1 (31)	Steamless shunter Status: scrapped	1940, to Albania in 1956
324.504		Steam locomotive	1	Locomotive built by MÁVAG in 1915 with factory number 3678 for MÁV, part of around 895 locomotives in the IIIu-series, number MÁV 324.504. After the Great War the locomotive ended in Romania. In 1951 it was exported to Albania and was in 1960 in service. Seen in 1985; Status: scrapped	1915, to Albania in 1951
Class 72		Steam locomotive	1 (2/3)	This industrial locomotive was built by ME in 1941 for Dynamit Nobel in Troisdorf with factory number 4472. Via Poland it was exported to Albania. It was used for rail construction and shunting later. In 1989, it was taken out of service. One or two other locomotives did also exist, but more details are unavailable. Status: scrapped	1941, to Albania in 1951
Class 48		1'D1 ' 2-8-2 Steam locomotive	6	New, built in Poland with a top speed of 80 km/h and built in the same series as TKt48 class. Fleet number TKt 48.01-48.06 In service until 1991. One locomotive is a monument in Tirana.Status: scrapped, but one	1951, 1952
106-002; 106-003		Steam locomotive	2	Former Austrian locomotives, part of the large series kkStB class 429 for kkStB. These. 106-002 built in 1912 by StEG Vienna with factory number 3844. Original fleet number 429.190. In second world war renumbered to DR 35.391. After second world war to JDŽ as 106-002. 106-003 built by WLF Floridsdorf in 1915 with factory number 2272. In second world war renumbered to DR 35.389. After second world war to JDŽ as 106-002 gift from Soviet Union. Status: scrapped	1932
Krauss-Maffei 2000		DE locomotive	5 (2001-2005)	Former German locomotives DB Class 221, bought secondhand in 1988. Shipped in 1989-1990. 2001: 221.118, 2002: 221.140, 2003: 221.125, 2004: 221.131, 2005: 221.109. Taken out of service in 1992 (2003: 1993), after technical problems. A second order for 20 locomotives was cancelled due to this. Most scrapped and burned after the 1997 riots. Then, all but 2003 were in Memelisht. 2003 was in Prrenjas.Status: scrapped, 2003 still off duty in 2018	1956
V36 453		Diesel hydraulic locomotive	1	German shunting locomotive built in 1940 or 1941 by BMAG (factory number 11461) for German Wehrmacht. Used in Freilassing at the Heeres-Munitionsanstalt. In 1956 it was taken out of service after a damage beyond repairStatus: scrapped	1941
T435 0500		DE locomotive	10	Identical to Czech 720 class. In 2009, 0524, 0526, 0591 were found in Prrenjas. Status: most out of service	1958
T211 0450		DE locomotive	4	Identical to Czech T211 class	1959
T458/459 1500		DE locomotive	8	Identical to Czech T458 class. In 2009, 1523, 1525, 1526, 1530, 1531 were found in Prrenjas	1963
T-669 1000		DE locomotive	61 (series 1001-1061)	Status: partially in service	1978

=== Carriages ===
Class	Image	Type	Number	Remarks	Built
01 - 10, 21-69			59	Two axle cars second hand from several countries i.e. DDR, Hungary, Yugoslavia and war trophy not usable in these countries. According to sources these were quickly scrapped after delivery of newer stock Status: scrapped	1947 >
11-20			10	Former Polish 'Schnellzugwagen' Type PKP 8A, or new built for Albania. Present during the 1949 opening of the first Albanian railway. 11, 12 and 13 were rebuilt to vans with a large door in de center of te carriage.Status: ?	
D		Bagage Van	10 (01-10)	Chinese built. Originally green, later brown colored. Some were seen in 2011, out of service. Status: scrapped	1966-1972
B		YZ22 Passenger Car	40 (71-110)	Chinese built second class stock, built between 1966 and 1972 by Changchun Car Company. Total length 24.696 mm. Regular Type 22/YZ22 (硬座 = yìng zuò = YZ = Hard-seat) model that is mass produced for Chinese railways. Although mass produced, very uncommon in Europe. Fitted with both Chinese automatic chains as European chains. First color was blue, later green and more brown-iss on the end. Last cars were taken out of service around 2000. p Status: scrapped	1966-1972
			4 (series 151-154)	Second class coach. Built by Shkodër Wagon Works Status: scrapped	1980s
			4 (series 151-154)	Second class coach. Built by Shkodër Wagon Works Status: scrapped	1980s
B10t (type Bruhat)			43 (series 201-243) (in France: 50 87 20-47 423, 491, 496-812)	French stock, bought secondhand in the 1980s. Originally constructed between 1956 and 1962 in a serie of 318 coaches, reconstructed from 1900-1920 PLM coaches. In France called 'modernisées Sud Est' of 'Bruhat' Status: scrapped	1981-1982
AB 39-78			11 (series 401-411)	Former Italian coaches Status: partially active	>1959
B4ipü			45	Former Austria, built by Simmering-Graz-Pauker. Former Austrian numbers 50 81 20-04 000-059. Status: uncertain/ mostly scrapped	Arrived around 1999
Pafawag			8 (series 52-59)	Former Poland typ Osshd Y. Not sure if new or secondhand Status: uncertain	1981
Pafawag Bwixd			10 (series 61-70)	Former Poland typ Halberstadt/120A. Not sure if new or secondhand Status: 67 still in service in 2009.	1981
		By, Byuu, ABy	12. Series 51 41 21-43 013 - 24	Halberstadt Mitteleinstiegswagen, bought secondhand from Germany. Original built for GDR railways. German numbers 51 80 21 43 Status: most in service	
		UIC-X	63 (series 301-?)	Former Italian coaches series type B 29-38, B 29-40, B 29-70 Status: partially active	1992-1993
A 19-40			5 (series 501-505)	Former Italian coaches Status: partially active	

== See also ==
- History of rail transport in Albania
- Rail transport in Albania
- Transport in Albania
- List of European railways
