= L&YR Class 31 =

20th century British steam locomotive class

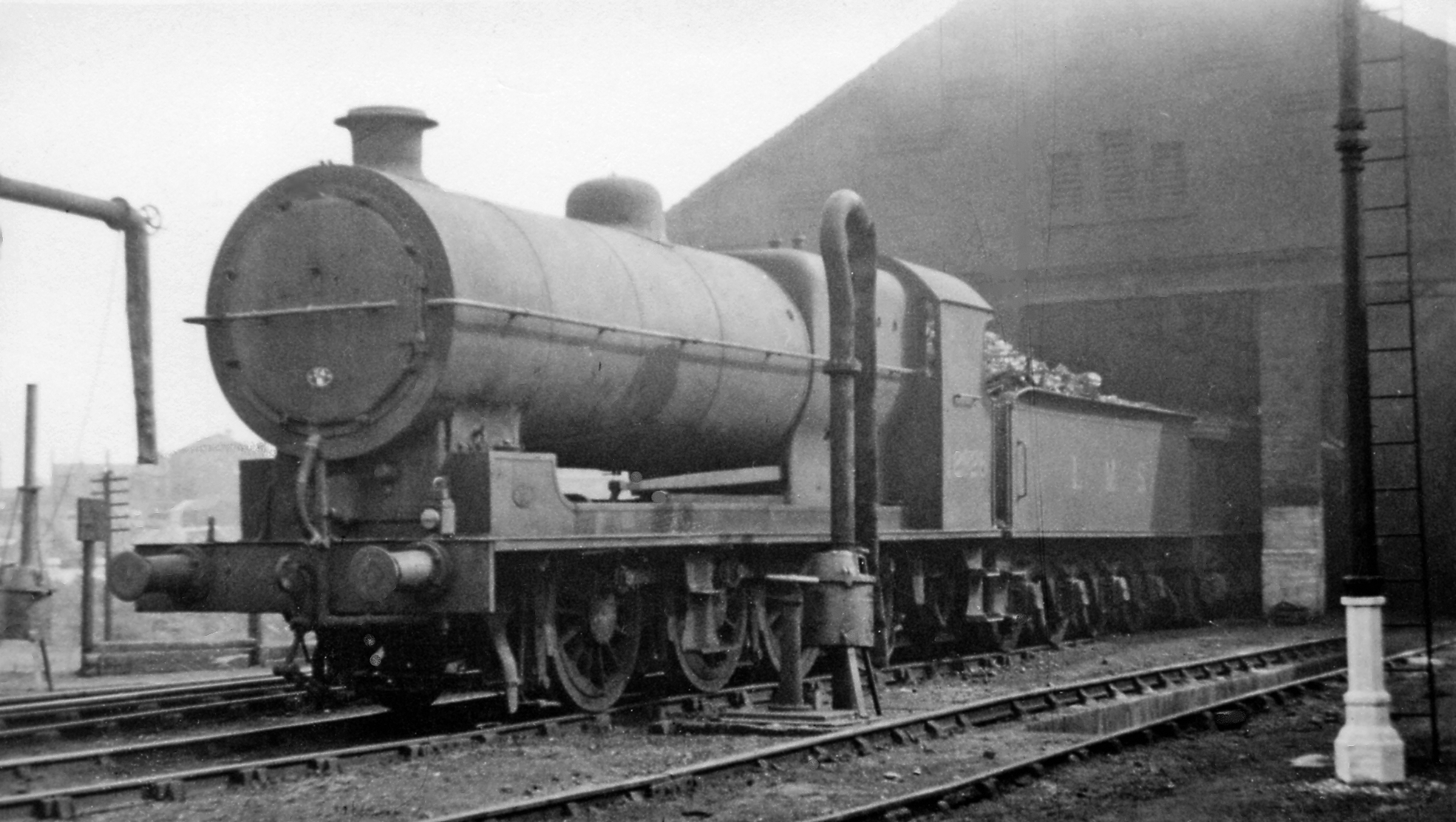
- No. 12928 at Normanton Locomotive Depot on 25 May 1947
Type and origin
- Power type: Steam
- Designer: George Hughes
- Build date: 1912-1920
- Total produced: New, 115; Rebuilds, 40; Total, 155
Specifications
- Configuration
  - Whyte: 0-8-0
- Gauge: 4 ft 8 1/2 in (1,435 mm)
- Driver dia.: 4 ft 6 in (1.372 m)
- Loco weight: 66.2 long tons (67.3 t)
- Fuel type: Coal
- Boiler pressure: 180 psi (1.24 MPa)
- Cylinders: Two, inside
- Cylinder size: 21.5 in × 26 in (546 mm × 660 mm)
- Valve gear: Joy
Performance figures
- Tractive effort: 34,055 lbf (151.5 kN)
Career
- Operators: L&YR, LMS, BR
- Power class: LMS 7F
- Locale: London Midland Region
- Withdrawn: Circa 1930-1951
- Disposition: All scrapped

The L&YR Class 31 was a class of 0-8-0 steam locomotives of the Lancashire and Yorkshire Railway. The class was designed by George Hughes and introduced in 1912. The class comprised 115 new locomotives (the 1546 Class, built 1912–21) and 40 rebuilt from two other classes: the 91 Class (built 1900–08) and the 9 Class (built 1918).

== Superheaters ==
All of the locomotives were superheated. Three main types of superheater were used: the Horwich "twin plug" type, fitted to twenty locomotives of the 1546 class and eight of the 91 Class; the Robinson type, fitted to ten of the 1546 class; and the Horwich "top and bottom header" type, fitted to the remaining 117 locomotives.

== Transfer to LMS ==
The locomotives passed to the London, Midland and Scottish Railway (LMS) in 1923. The LMS numbered them 12840-12994 and gave them the power classification 7F.

== Transfer to BR ==
Upon Nationalization in 1948, British Railways (BR) inherited 17 locomotives and numbered them in the range of 52841–52971.

== Withdrawal ==
All were withdrawn between Circa 1930 to December 1951. Sadly, no examples of this class were preserved.
