= HSH Class 31 =

Class 31
Type and origin
- Power type: Steam
- Builder: Henschel
- Serial number: 25271
- Model: Fireless shunting tank locomotive
- Build date: 1940
- Total produced: 1
Specifications
- Configuration
  - Whyte: 0-6-0F
- Gauge: 1,435 mm (4 ft 8 1/2 in)
Career
- Operators: Hekurudha Shqiptare
- Number in class: 1
- Numbers: 31
- Delivered: 1959
- Withdrawn: 1992
- Scrapped: Oct. 2010
- Disposition: scrapped

Class 31 was a fireless shunting steam locomotive used at an oil refinery in Cerrik, operating between Cerrik and Papër. It is unclear if the locomotive was operated by the factory or by Hekurudha Shqiptare, the railway company of Albania.

The locomotive was second-hand and originally built for pharmaceutical factory Wolff Walsrode for use in a factory in Bomlitz. It was sold to Albania in 1956. In the 1970s it was sold to a factory in Ballsh. The locomotive was scrapped in October 2010.
