= Seibu Class E31 =

Japanese electric locomotive

Class E31
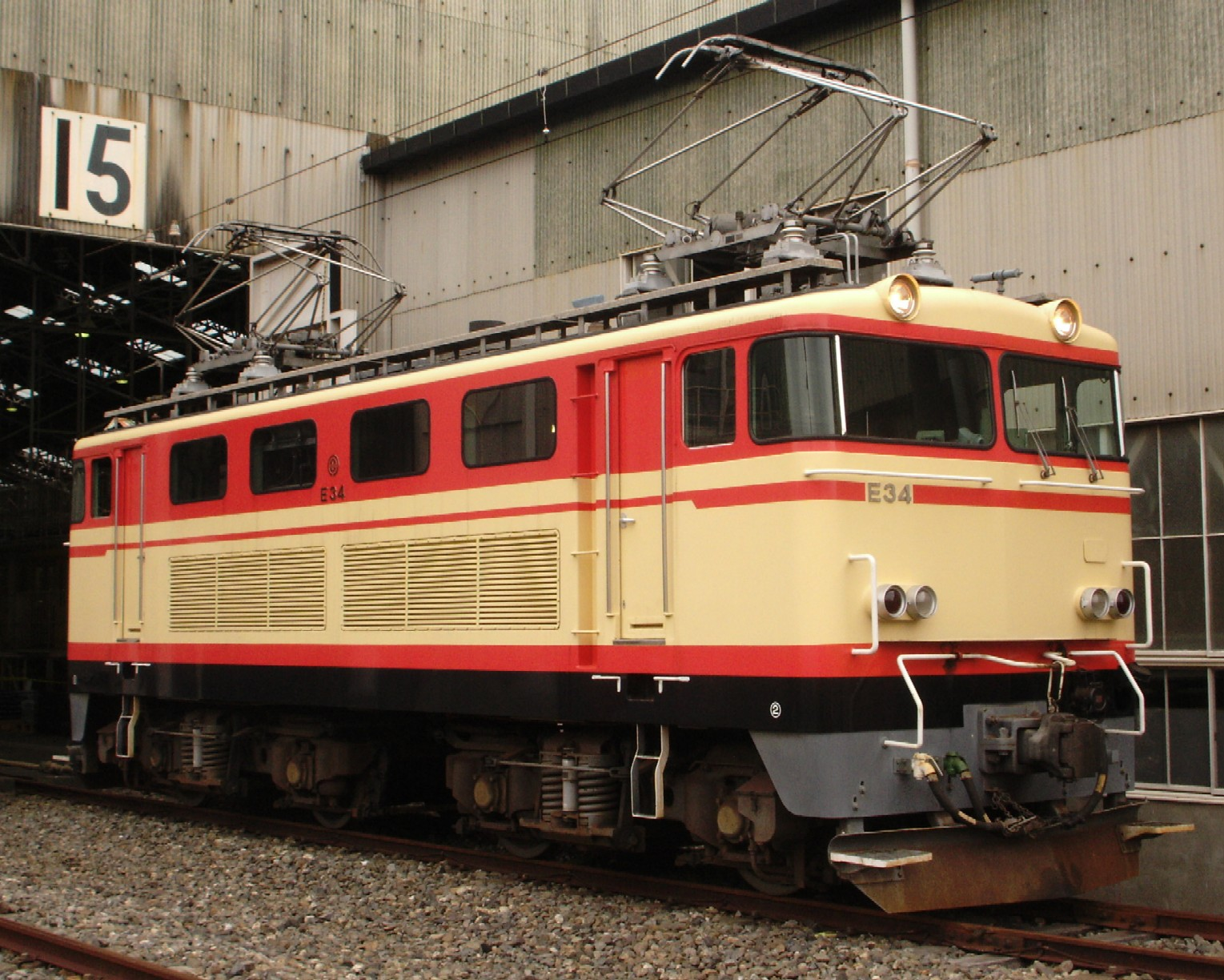
- Seibu Class E31 electric locomotive No. E34 on display at Minami-Iriso Depot Open Day, September 2007
Type and origin
- Power type: Electric
- Builder: Seibu (Tokorozawa)
- Build date: 1986-1987
- Total produced: 4
Specifications
- Configuration
  - UIC: Bo-Bo
- Gauge: 1,067 mm (3 ft 6 in)
- Electric system/s: 1,500 V DC
- Traction motors: DC
Performance figures
- Power output: 520 kW
Career
- Operators: Seibu Railway; Ōigawa Railway
- Disposition: 3 transferred to Ōigawa Railway

The Class E31 (E31形) is a class of DC Bo-Bo wheel arrangement electric locomotives formerly operated by the private railway operator Seibu Railway in Japan until March 2010 and subsequently by the Ōigawa Railway.

Four locomotives (numbered E31 to E34) were built at Seibu's Tokorozawa factory between 1986 and 1987 to replace ageing first-generation electric locomotives on freight services and track maintenance train duties. The DT-20A bogies were reused from former JNR 80 series EMUs, and the traction motors were modified from former EMU motors.

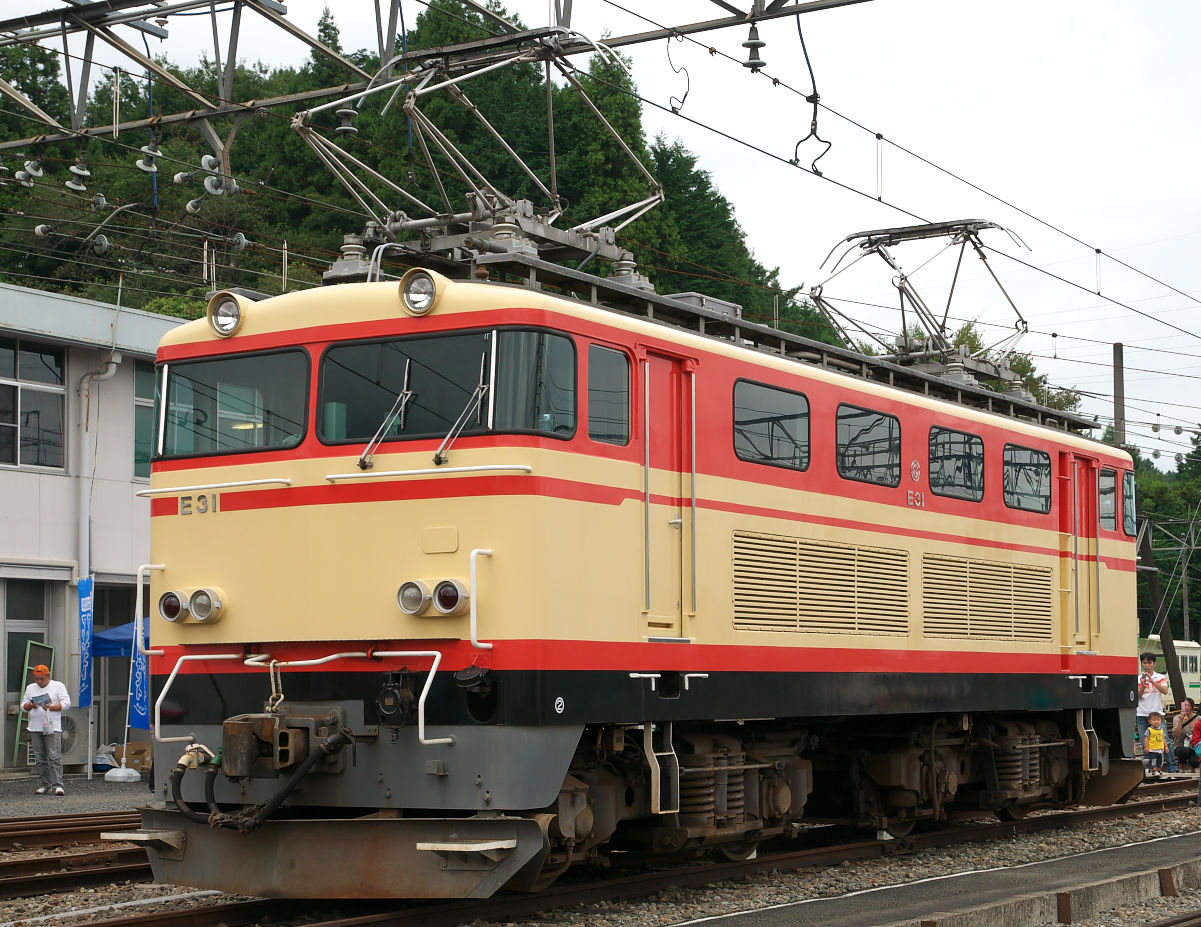
Seibu Railway E31

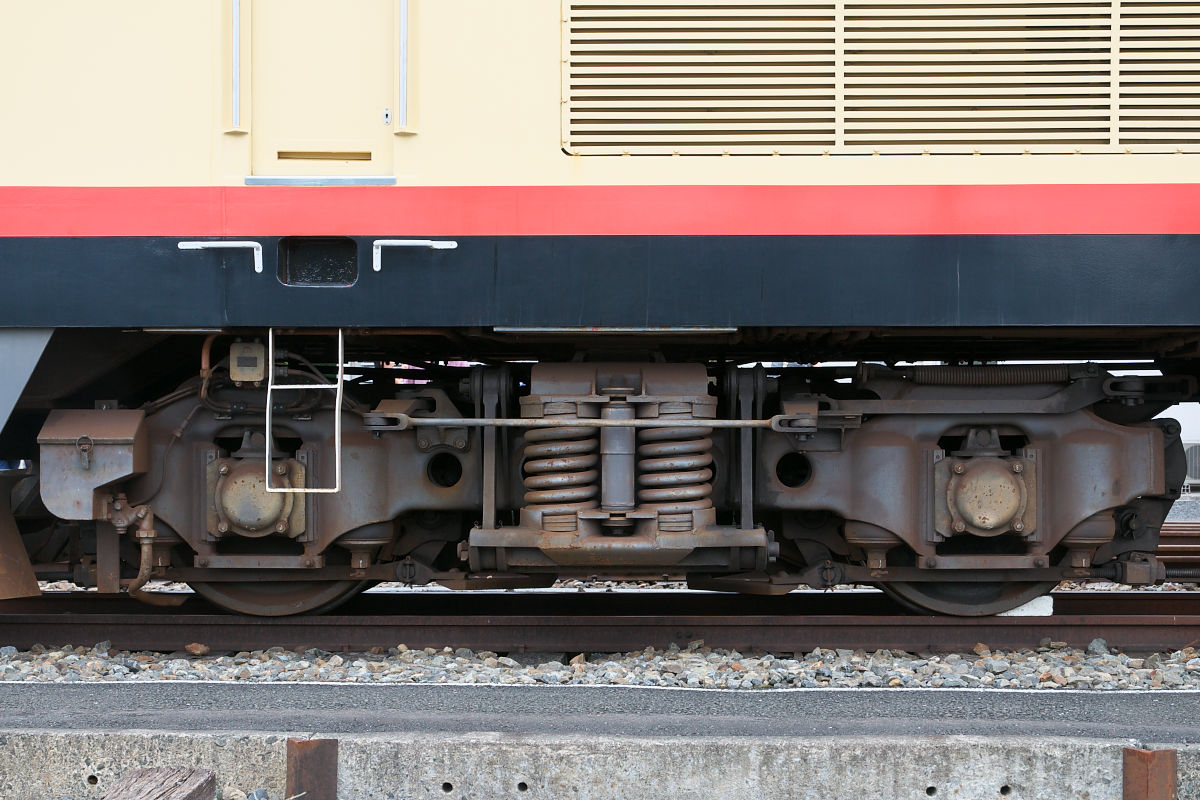
Closeup of the DT-20A bogie

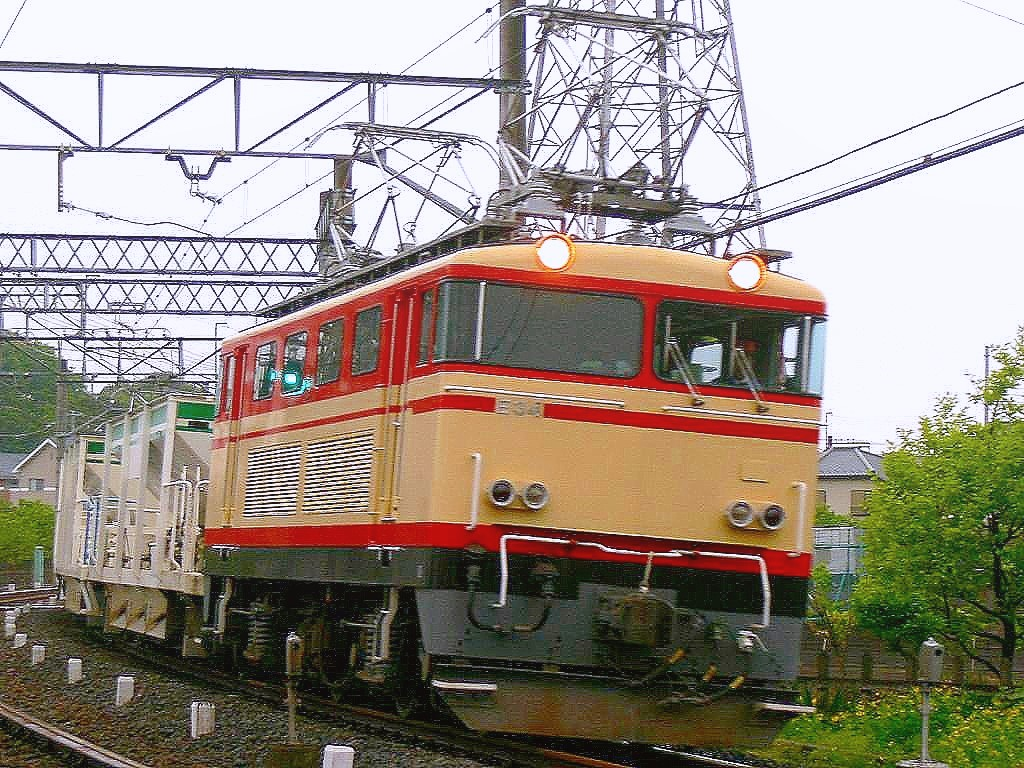
Seibu Railway E33･34 Electric locomotive and Hoki 81 freight car

They were normally used in pairs by Seibu for top-and-tailing permanent way maintenance trains and to haul newly delivered rolling stock.

Locomotive number E33 was withdrawn on 31 January 2009, becoming the first of the class to be withdrawn. The remaining three locomotives were withdrawn on 28 March 2010.

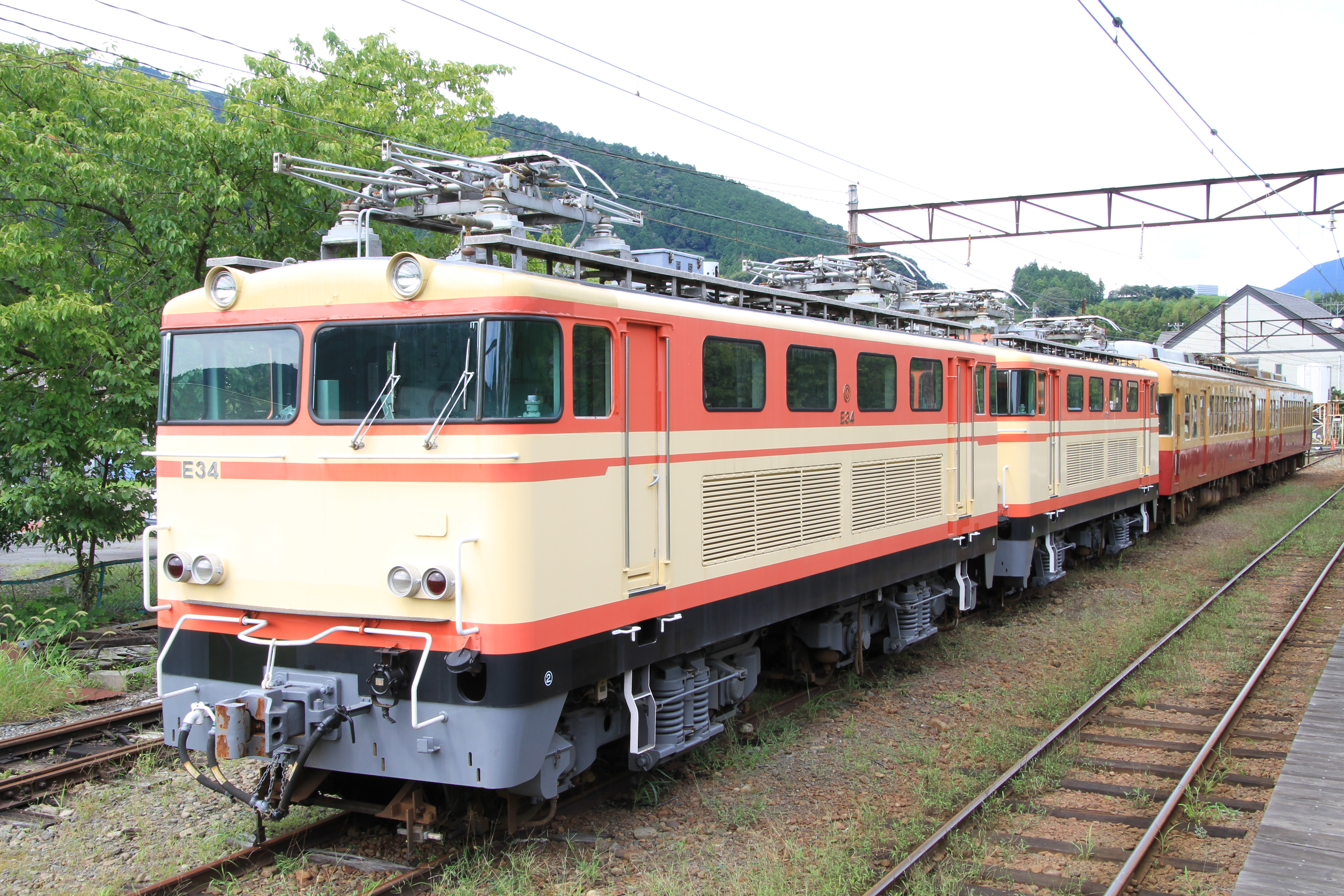
A pair of Class E31 locomotives, including E34, stored on the Oigawa Railway in August 2014

In September 2010, three of the withdrawn Class E31 locomotives (E32 to E34) were transferred to the Ōigawa Railway to replace the ageing E10 and ED500 locomotives used there. Initially they were used only for depot shunting duties, but from 2017 they underwent overhaul in preparation for use as helper locomotives on steam-hauled trains, with the first locomotive treated, E34, scheduled to enter revenue service on 15 October 2017. Occasionally, they are used to haul the EL Kawane michi-gō express.

Locomotive E31 remains preserved at Seibu's Yokoze Depot.

== See also ==
- Seibu Class E851
