= Bar–Virpazar railway =

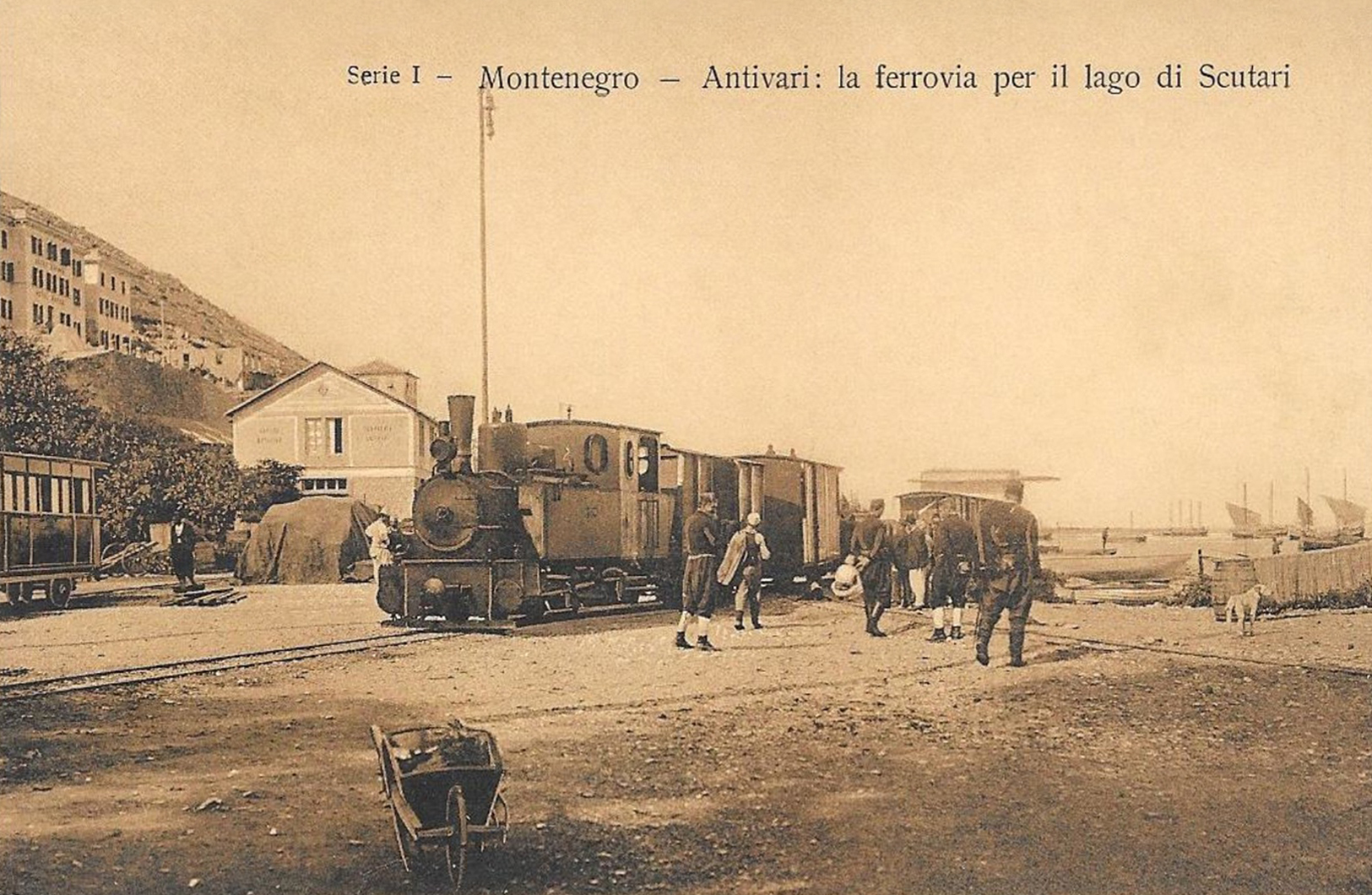
- The Bar station and the railway to Virpazar, circa 1910

Overview
- Status: Ceased operation
- Locale: Montenegro
- Termini: Bar; Virpazar

Service
- Type: Local railway
- System: Yugoslav Railways

History
- Opened: 2 November 1908
- Closed: 29 November 1959

Technical
- Track gauge: 750 mm (2 ft 5 1/2 in)

Bar–Virpazar railway was an isolated narrow-gauge railway in Montenegro between the towns of Bar and Virpazar. It was opened in 1908, and was the first railway built in the Principality of Montenegro. It connected the Port of Bar on the Adriatic coast with the Virpazar port on the Lake Skadar. Total length of the line was 43.3 km on the 750 mm gauge rail. It was abandoned in 1959 when the standard-gauge railway Bar–Titograd (now part of the Belgrade–Bar railway) was opened to traffic.

== History ==
On 26 June 1906, the Government of Montenegro signed a contract with Italian company "Compania d'Antivari". The company was to build a sea port in Bari (Italian: Antivari), a lake port in Virpazar and the Bar–Virpazar railway based on a 60-year lease. The railway was finished in 1908 and opened for traffic on 2 November 1908. It was the first railway built in Montenegro. All until the end of World War II, it operated as a private railway administrated by the Italians.

In 1946, after the communists took power, the whole Compania d'Antivari together with the railway was nationalized and it became part of the Yugoslav State Railways. In April 1959, the standard-gauge line between Bar and Virpazar was finished as the first part of the Belgrade–Bar railway, and the narrow gauge railway was abandoned.

== See also ==
- Rail transport in Montenegro
