= Nikšić–Podgorica railway =

Railway line in Montenegro

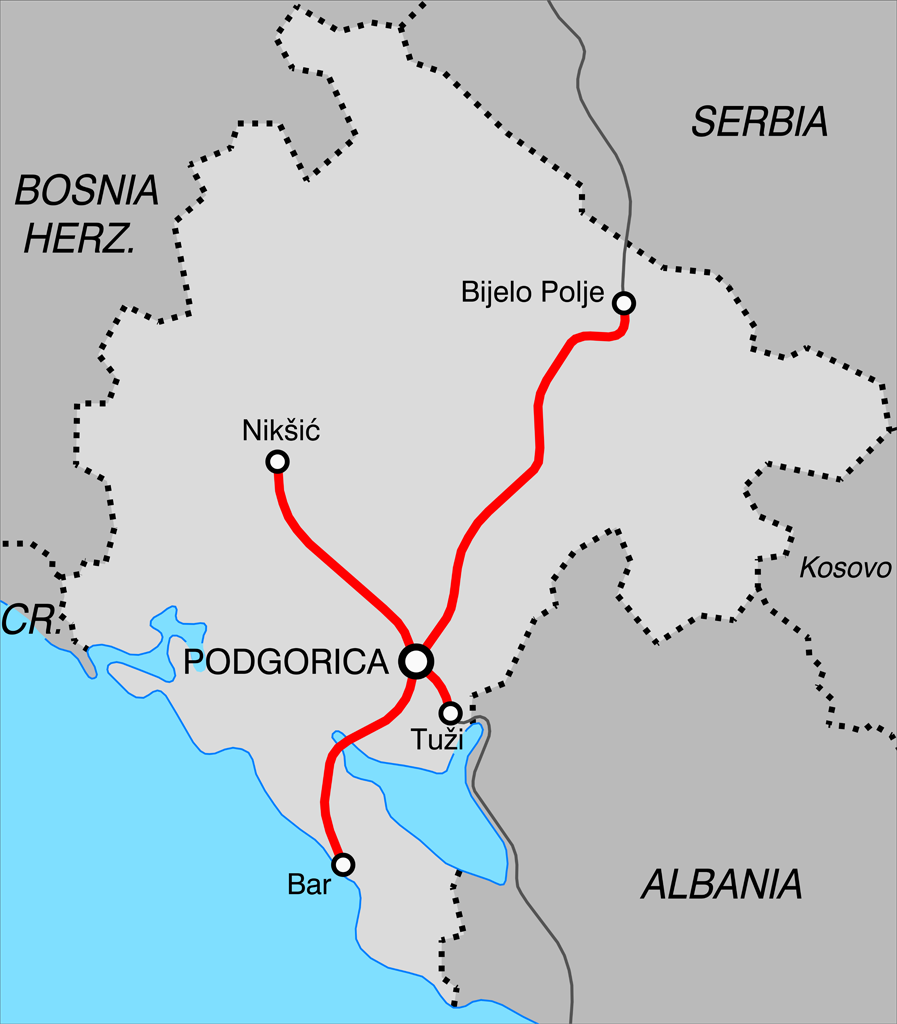

Overview
- Owner: ŽICG
- Termini: Nikšić; Podgorica
- Stations: 5

Service
- Operator: ŽPCG

History
- Opened: 1948

Technical
- Line length: 56.4 km (35 mi)
- Number of tracks: 1
- Track gauge: 1,435 mm (4 ft 8 1/2 in) standard gauge
- Old gauge: 760 mm (2 ft 5 15/16 in) Bosnian gauge
- Electrification: 25 kV, 50 Hz AC
- Operating speed: 75–100 km/h (45–60 mph)

The Nikšić–Podgorica railway is a railway connecting Montenegro's capital Podgorica and the country's second largest city, Nikšić. The line connects to the Belgrade–Bar railway and the Podgorica–Shkodër railway at Podgorica. It is operated by ŽICG.

== Overview ==
Nikšić–Podgorica is a 56.4-kilometre-long (35.0 mi) standard-gauge railway. It passes through 12 tunnels of total length of 3,439 m (11,283 ft), and across nine bridges (overall length of 279 m (915 ft)), mostly following the Bjelopavlići plain along its corridor. The speeds on this line are between 75 and 100 km/h (45 and 60 mph). The line has five stations (Nikšić, Ostrog, Danilovgrad, Spuž and Podgorica) and seven halts.

== History ==
The line was built as a narrow gauge 760 mm (2 ft 5 15/16 in) Bosnian gauge railway in 1948. It was connected to the preexisting Nikšić–Bileća line. In 1965, the line was upgraded to standard gauge. The extension to Bileća was decommissioned in 1976.

The railway has primarily been used for transport of bauxite ore from the Nikšić mine to the Podgorica Aluminium Plant. Chronic lack of funds for maintenance resulted in operating speeds being reduced to 30 km/h (20 mph), and end of passenger service in 1992. Passenger service was reintroduced in 2012.

In 2006, thorough reconstruction and electrification of the line begun, with consortium of Czech companies (OHL ŽS "Brno", AŽD and EŽ) undertaking the construction works. The reconstruction was scheduled to be completed in 2009, but was completed only in 2012, due to funding problems. The entire project had a cost close to €72 million.

The reconstructed railway was officially opened on 1 October 2012, with operating speeds increased to 75–100 km/h (45–60 mph) range, and passenger service reintroduced. Three CAF Civity EMUs ordered by Railways of Montenegro specifically to serve this railway were scheduled to arrive in Montenegro in July 2013.

== See also ==
- Rail transport in Montenegro
