= Podgorica railway station =

Railway station in Podgorica, Montenegro

Coordinates: 42.4325°N 19.2693°E

Podgorica Railway Station Жељезничка станица Подгорица Željeznička stanica Podgorica
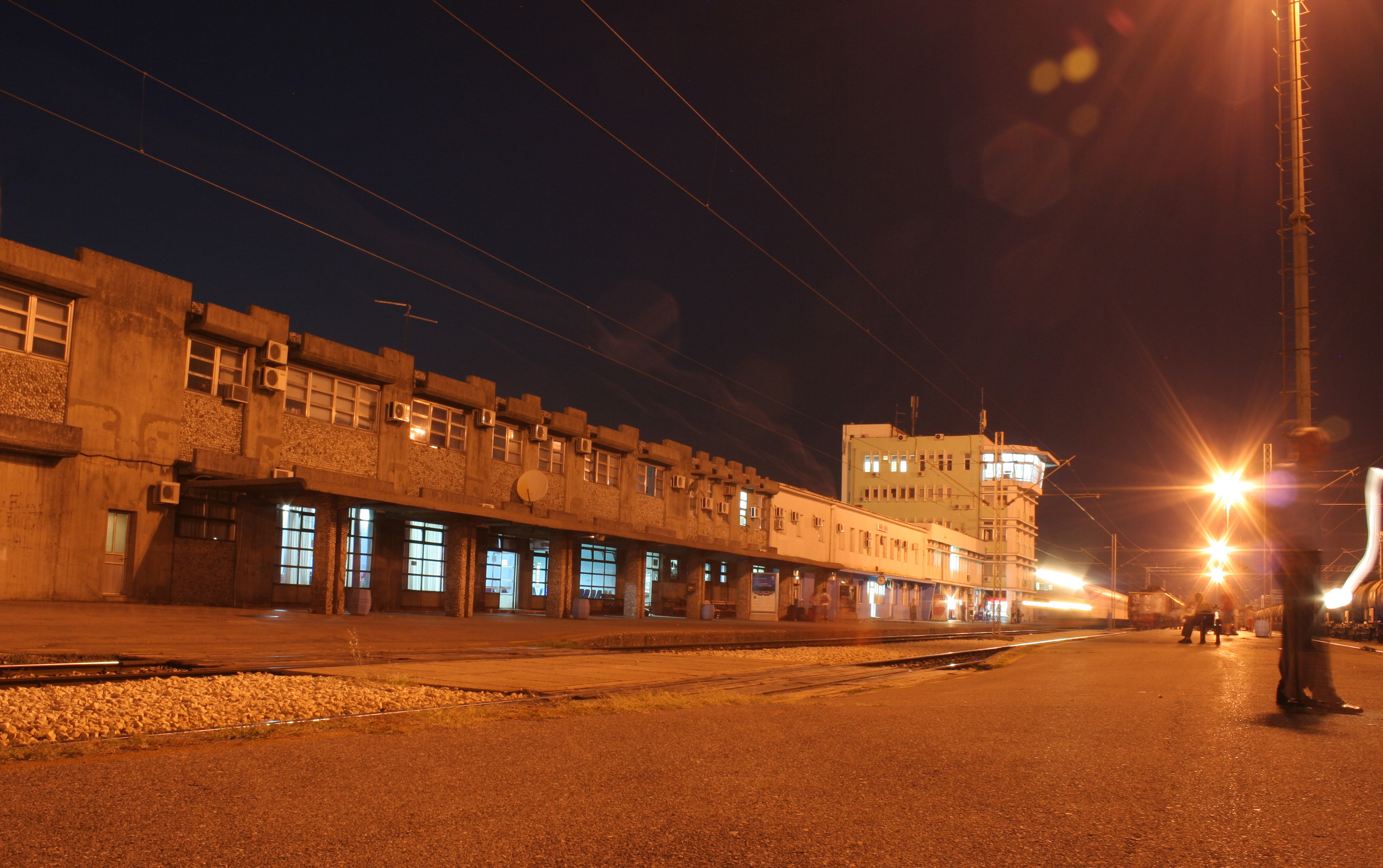
- View of the station at night

General information
- Location: Trg golootočkih žrtava 7 Podgorica, Montenegro
- Owner: ŽICG
- Lines: Belgrade - Bar; Nikšić - Podgorica; Podgorica - Shkodër
- Platforms: 2
- Tracks: 12

Construction
- Accessible: yes

History
- Opened: 1927

Services
Preceding station	ŽICG	Following station
Bioče toward Belgrade	Brzi; Lovćen (night train)	Golubovci toward Bar
Location

The Podgorica Railway Station (Montenegrin: Жељезничка станица Подгорица, romanized: Željeznička stanica Podgorica) is a railway station located in Podgorica, Montenegro.

== History ==
The first railway station in Podgorica was built in 1927 near the clock tower in the Stara Varoš (Old Town) part of the city, some 0.8 km (0.50 mi) away from the current station. The current station was built after World War II, and it was upgraded gradually to its current shape and capacity up until the 1970s.

It is the only train station located in Podgorica, and serves as a hub for Railways of Montenegro. The Belgrade–Bar railway converges with the line to Nikšić and line to Shkodër at the station. The station is a through station, located on a trunk line that bisects Podgorica in a north–south direction.

The station building was not planned as a permanent passenger station, but rather as an administration and control centre for the Montenegrin railway system. The passenger terminal was meant to be built as a separate building. However, due to the lack of funds, the current building is still serving as a provisional passenger terminal. Thus, the waiting room, restaurant, ticket booths and retail facilities are of inadequate capacity, and the quality of service is subpar when compared to the main stations of cities of similar size.

There are three tracks for passenger service, served by one side platform adjacent to the terminal building, and one island platform, with a pedestrian crossing between the two. The area further from the station terminal building is occupied by the largest rail yard in Montenegro, where there are numerous service, repair, freight and other facilities used by the various Montenegrin railway companies. The large area surrounding the station, coupled with the headquarters and operational services situated in the station building, make up the heart of the Montenegrin railway system.

== Services ==
It is one of 52 scheduled stops on the Belgrade–Bar railway and the main southern terminal (freight trains continue south to the port). The station is served by both Montenegro Railways and Serbian Railways for regular Serbia-Montenegro routes, however during the summer season, it also serves Macedonian Railways (Bar-Skopje line). and Russian Railways (Bar-Moscow line).
