= JŽ series 461 =

Locomotive class

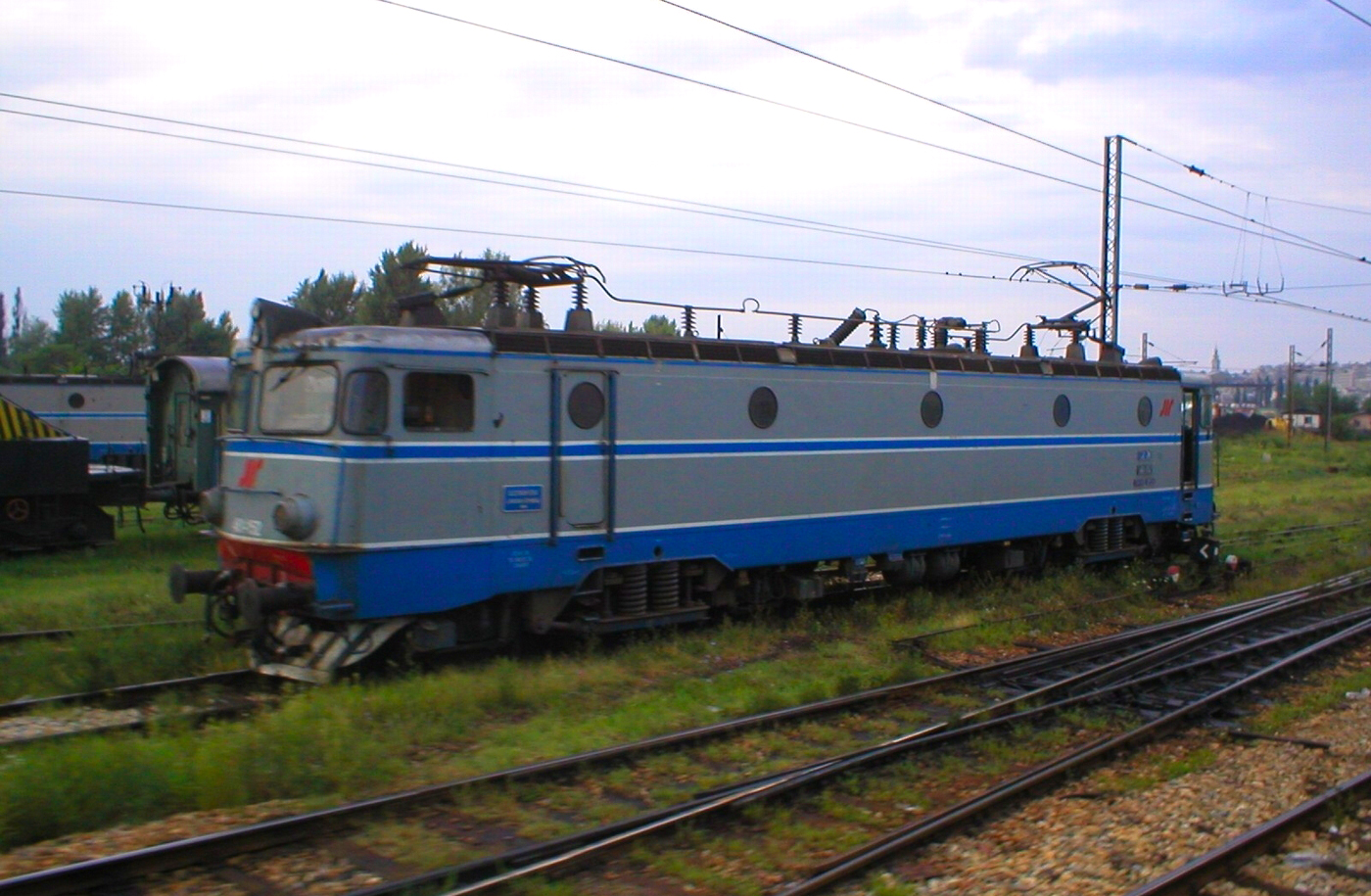
- JŽ 461 in former grey and blue livery, identical to one formerly used on CFR locos
Type and origin
- Power type: Electric
- Designer: ASEA
- Builder: Electroputere
- Build date: 1971-1973; 1978-1980
- Total produced: 103
Specifications
- Configuration
  - UIC: Co′Co′
- Gauge: 1,435 mm (4 ft 8 1/2 in) standard gauge
- Length: 19,800 mm (65 ft 0 in)
- Loco weight: 120 tonnes (120 long tons; 130 short tons)
- Electric system/s: 25 kV 50 Hz AC Catenary
- Current pickup: Pantograph
Performance figures
- Maximum speed: 120 km/h (75 mph)
Career
- Class: ŽS 461; ŽCG 461; MŽ 461
- Nicknames: Rumunka (Romanian girl)
- Locale: Serbia; Montenegro; North Macedonia

The JŽ series 461 is a six-axle electric locomotive built in Romania for Yugoslav Railways. Today they are known as ŽS series 461 in Serbia, ŽCG series 461 in Montenegro and MŽ series 461 in North Macedonia.

== History ==
This series is originally based on the SJ Rb built by the Swedish company ASEA, later made with licence by the Electroputere Craiova works for the Romanian Railways starting in 1965, called the EA series, with a similar design made for the Norwegian Railways, the El 15. The 103 electric locomotives had been produced by Electroputere from Craiova in two subseries for Yugoslav Railway. First subseries, JŽ 461-0 consisted from 45 locomotives build from 1971 to 1973. Second subseries, JŽ 461-1 was built from 1978 until 1980 and it consisted from 58 locomotives. Romania delivered to Yugoslavia a number of 103 Co'Co locomotives of the 461 JŽ series. These locomotives were made in exchange to a number of JŽ series 441 based units, made by RK Zagreb and MIN Niš for the CFR, delivered between 1973 and 1984 and known as the EC series in the CFR classification.

== Operators ==
After dissolution of Yugoslavia, 461 class have remain in service with railways of Serbia, Montenegro and North Macedonia. Today there are 46 locomotives operated by Serbian Railways. Most Serbian locomotives were passed to the cargo division in 2015, with 5 units retained for passenger trains on the Belgrade-Bar line. Railway transport of Montenegro operates 10 and Montecargo 8 locomotives of class 461, being only electric locomotive operated in Montenegro. This series is mainly used on Belgrade–Bar railway by both Serbian and Montenegrin railways. Six locomotives of 461 series are operated by Macedonian Railways, with two of them modernised and thyristorized to series 462.

== Voltage ==
This locomotive utilises 25 kV/50 Hz AC.

== Liveries ==
Originally 461 series locomotives were painted in grey livery with blue base and line, at the time the standard livery for EA series electrics in Romania. Overhauled Montenegrin locomotives are painted in red and yellow with white stripes, with "Željeznice Crne Gore A.D." inscription in it, and, the non- overhauled ones are painted in red and blue, with white stripes. All refurbished class 461 locomotives of Serbian Railways have red and greyish-blue livery which is the same as for other electric locomotives operated - 441 and 444 series.

== Gallery ==
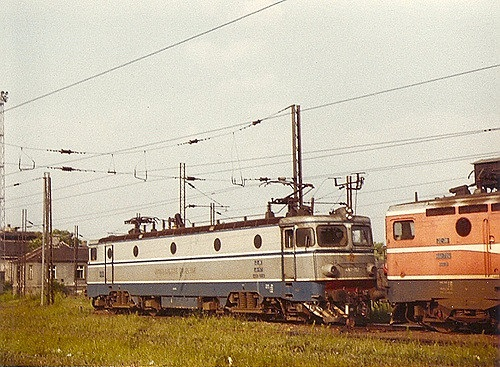
A JŽ 461 in its original livery at Belgrade.

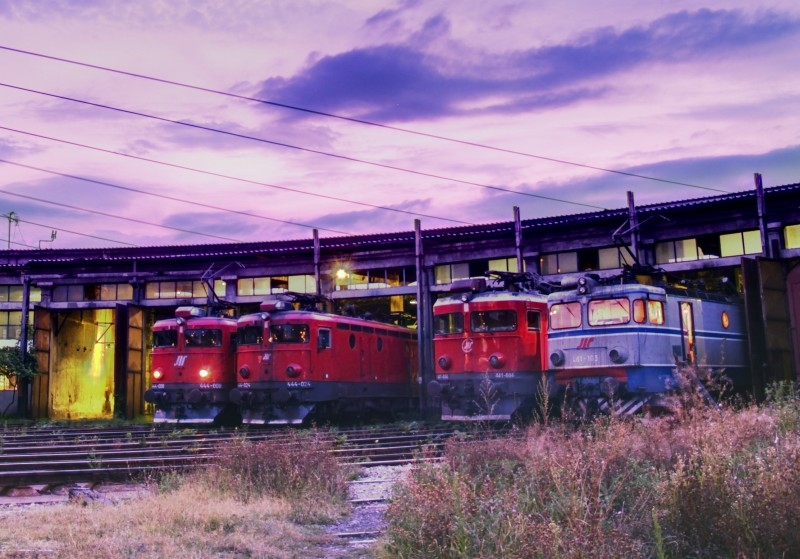
Two Serbian Railways ŽS 444 (left), a ŽS 441 and a ŽS 461 in the old shed at Belgrade.

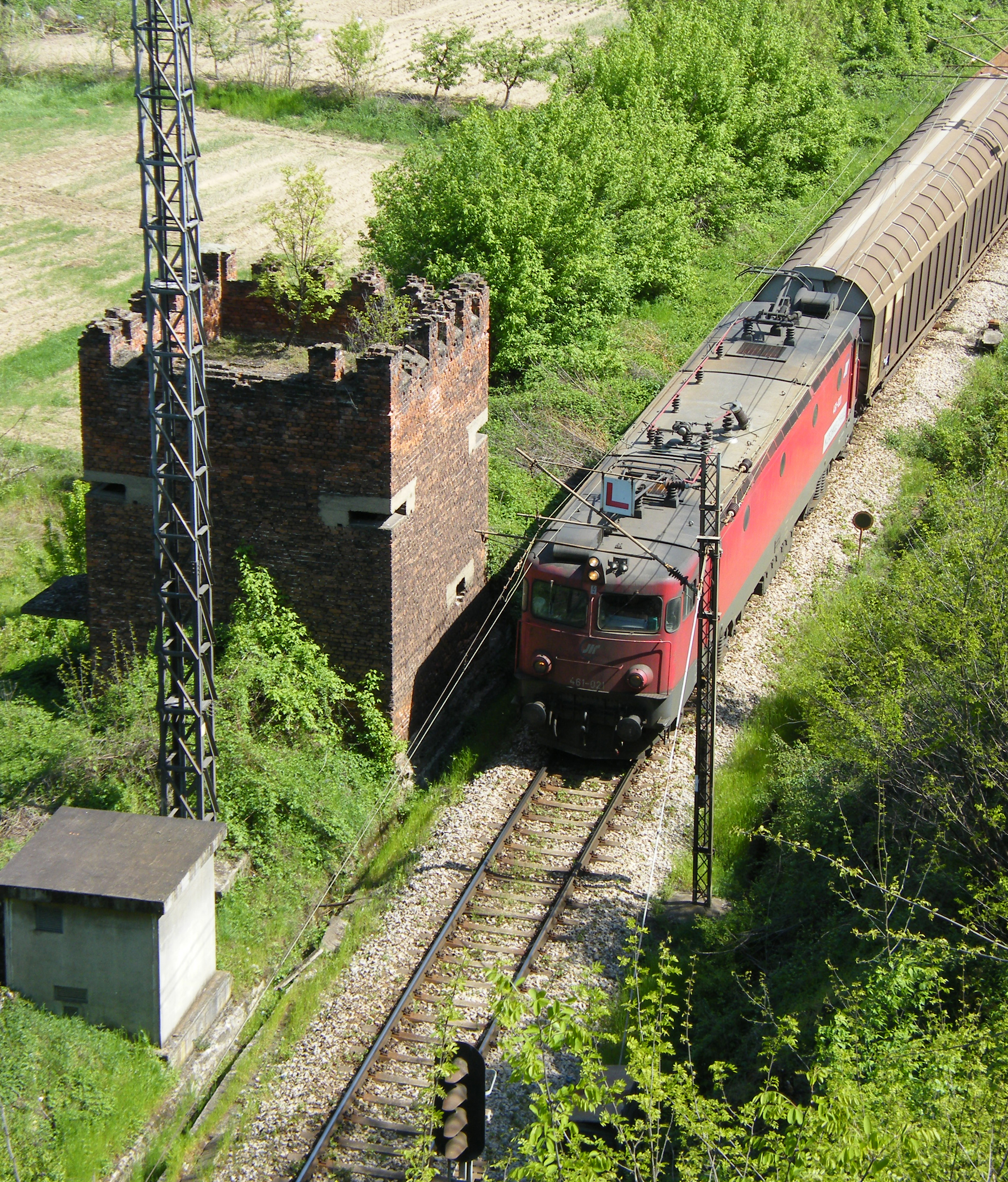
Serbian locomotive ŽS 461-021 hauling a freight train near Vladičin Han.

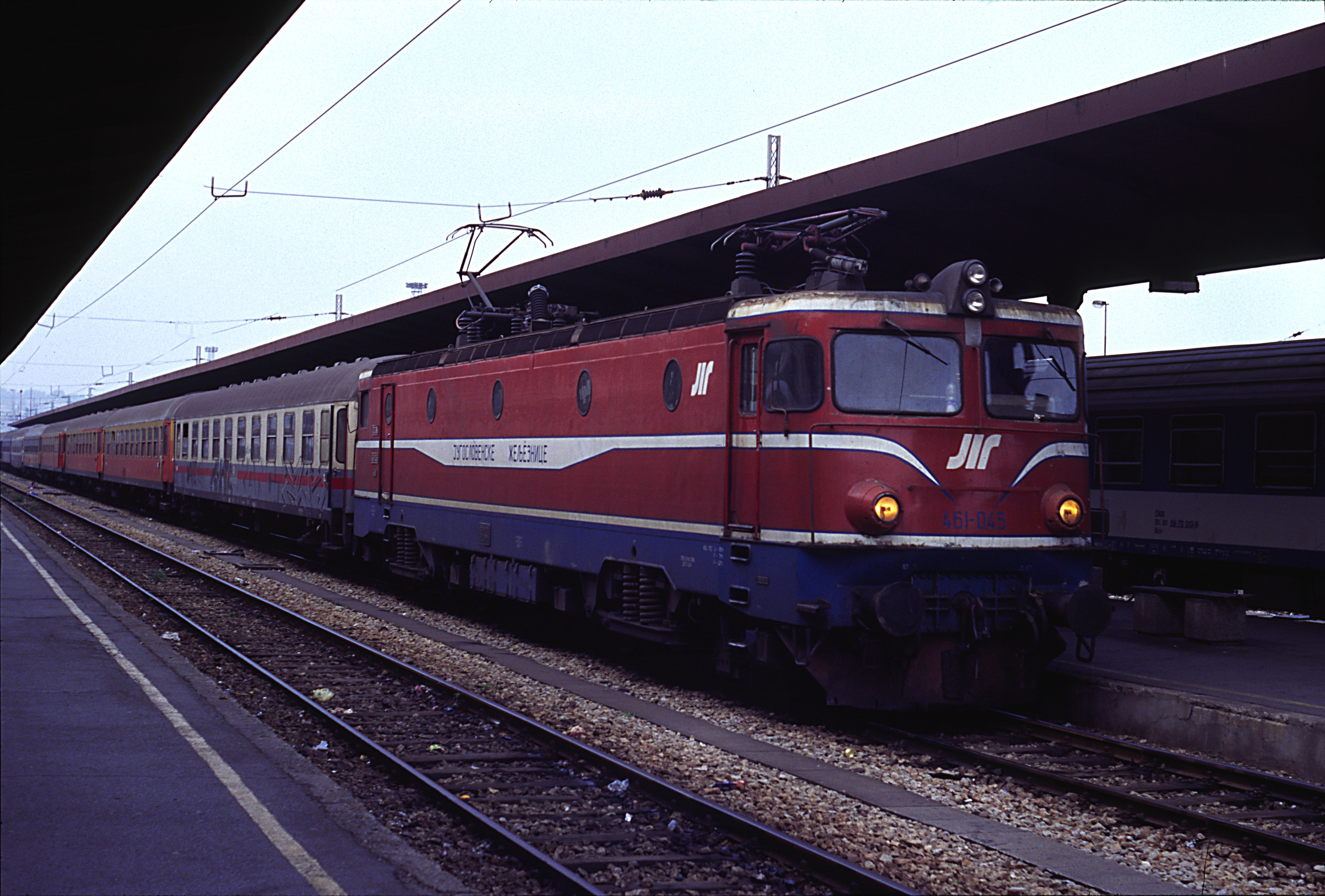
An unrestored ŽCG 461 in Belgrade.

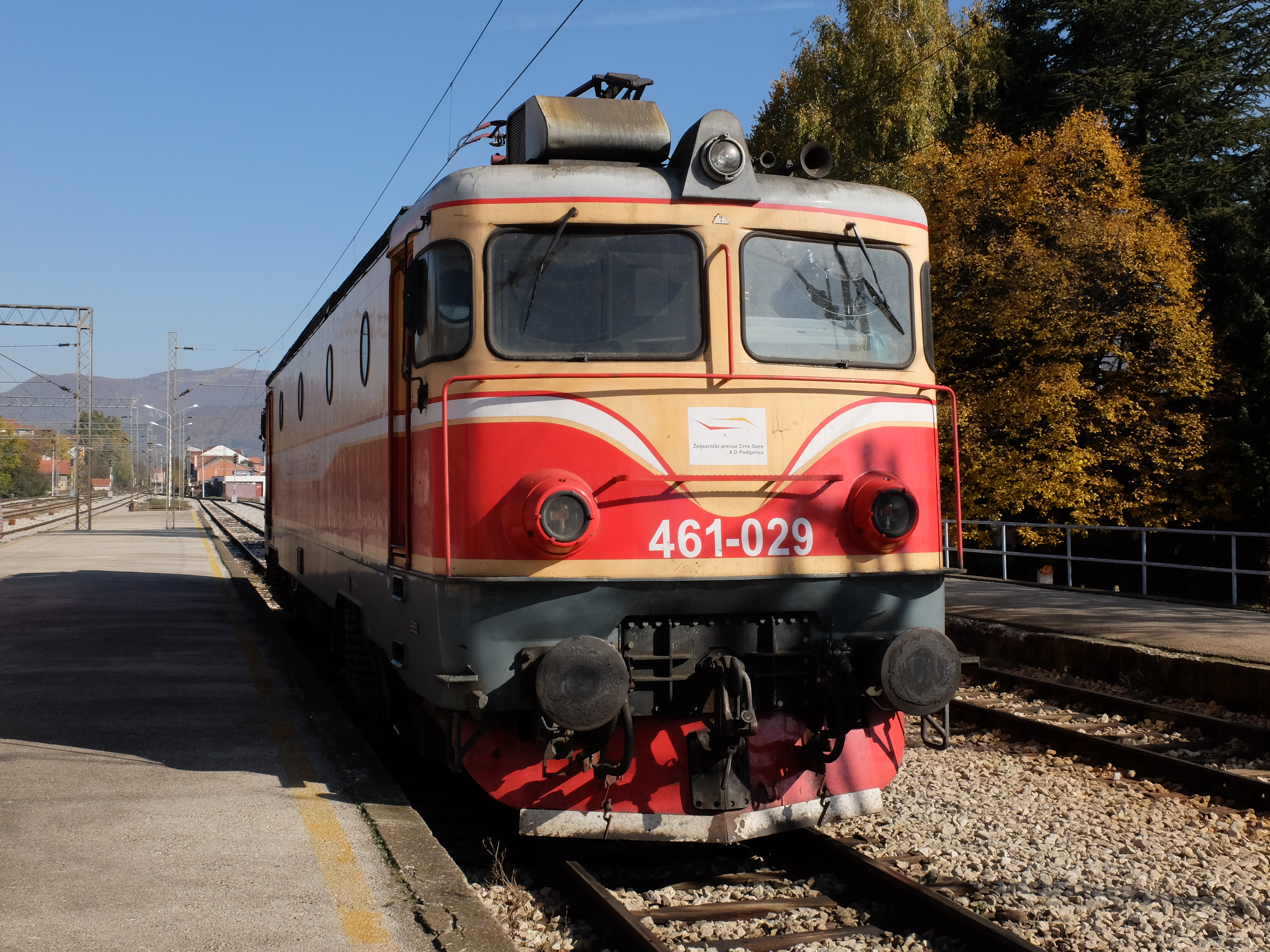
A restored ŽCG 461-029 at Bijelo polje.

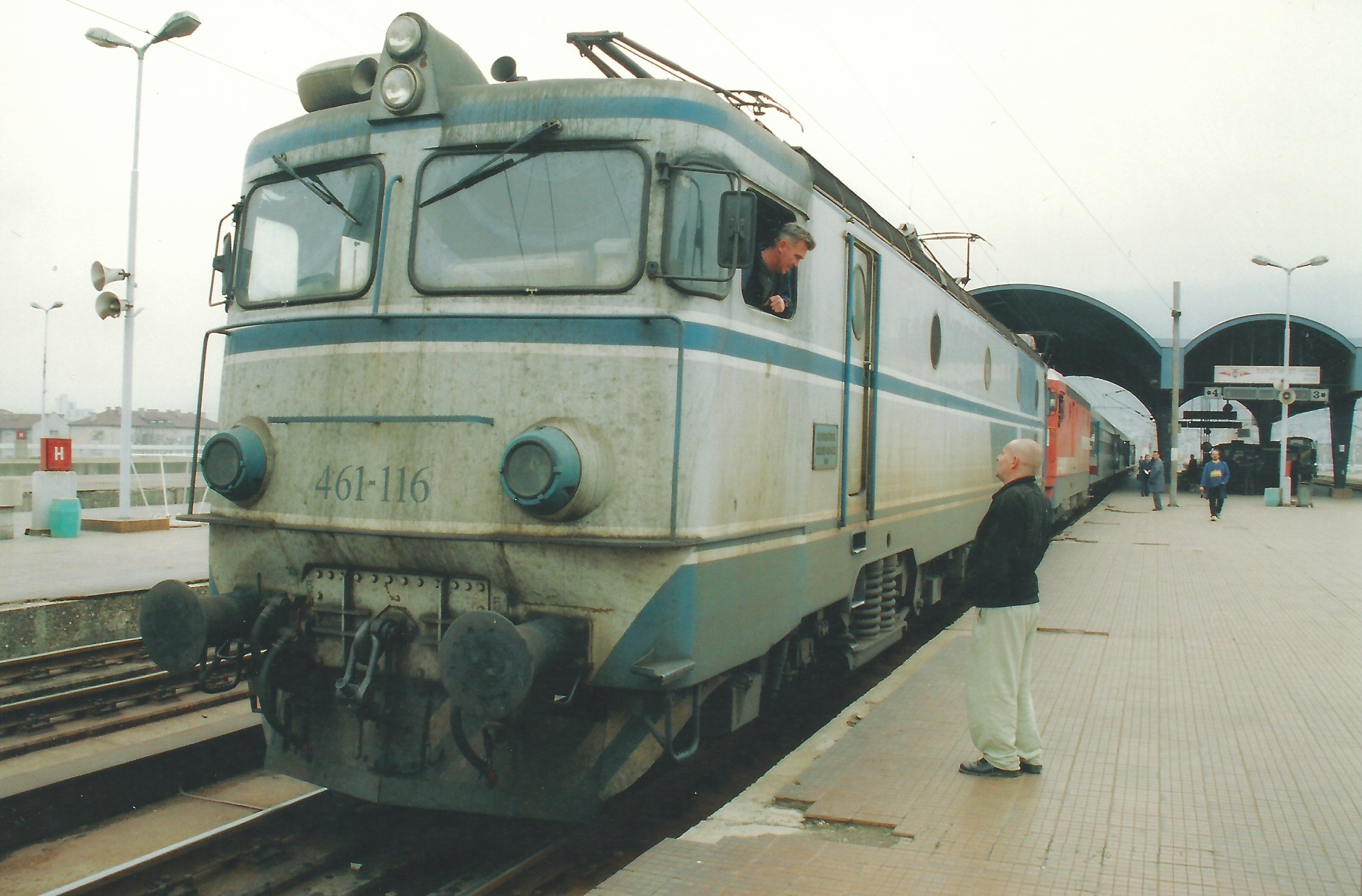
An MŽ 461 in Skopje.

== See also ==
- Belgrade-Bar railway
- Rail transport in Montenegro
