= Bar railway station =

Railroad station in Bar, Montenegro

Bar railway station Жељезничка станица Бар Željeznička stanica Bar
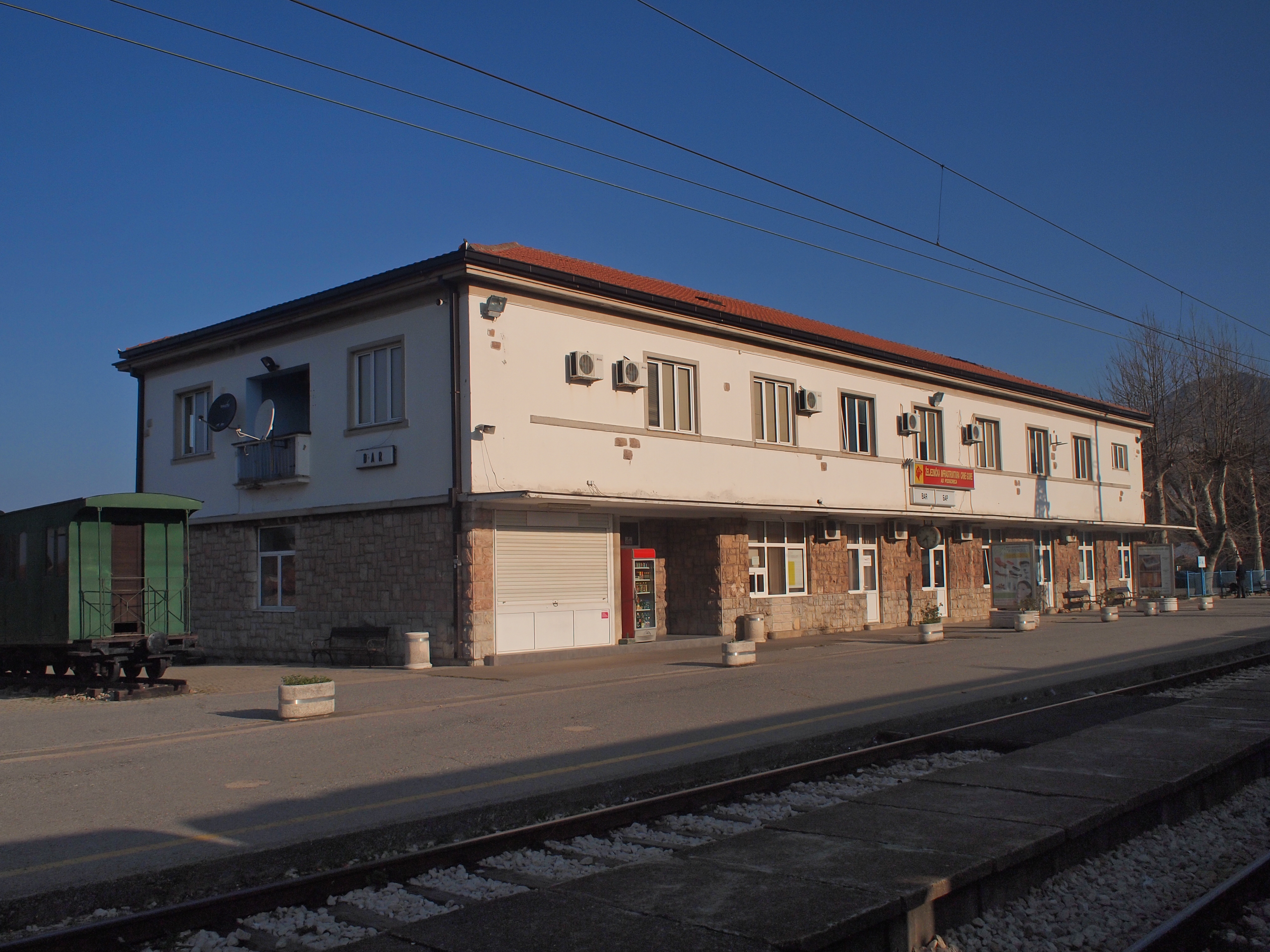
- The track side of Bar station in 2014

General information
- Coordinates: 42.0874°N 19.1052°E
- Owner: ŽICG
- Line: Belgrade - Bar
- Platforms: 4
- Tracks: 14

Construction
- Accessible: yes

Services
Preceding station	ŽICG	Following station
Sutomore toward Belgrade	Brzi; Lovćen (night train)	Terminus
Location

Bar railway station (Montenegrin: Жељезничка станица Бар, romanized: Željeznička stanica Bar) is a railway station located in Bar, Montenegro.

== History ==
The decision to build the railway connection between Belgrade and Bar was made in 1952 as a national project of the Socialist Federal Republic of Yugoslavia. However, the construction was passed to the constituent Republics, SR Serbia and SR Montenegro, to build on their own sections. The Podgorica – Bar section was completed in 1959, with the construction works concluded on 27 November 1975 by joining the railway tracks south of Kolašin. The railway was opened on 28 May 1976 by President Josip Broz Tito and First Lady Jovanka Broz. Electrification was completed at the end of 1977.

== Services ==
It is one of 52 scheduled stops on the Belgrade–Bar railway and the main southern terminal (freight trains continue south to the port). The station is served by both Montenegro Railways and Serbian Railways for regular Serbia-Montenegro routes, however during the summer season, it also serves Macedonian Railways (Bar-Skopje line).

== See also ==
- Railway stations in Montenegro
