= Mala Rijeka Viaduct =

Railway bridge in Montenegro

The Mala Rijeka Viaduct
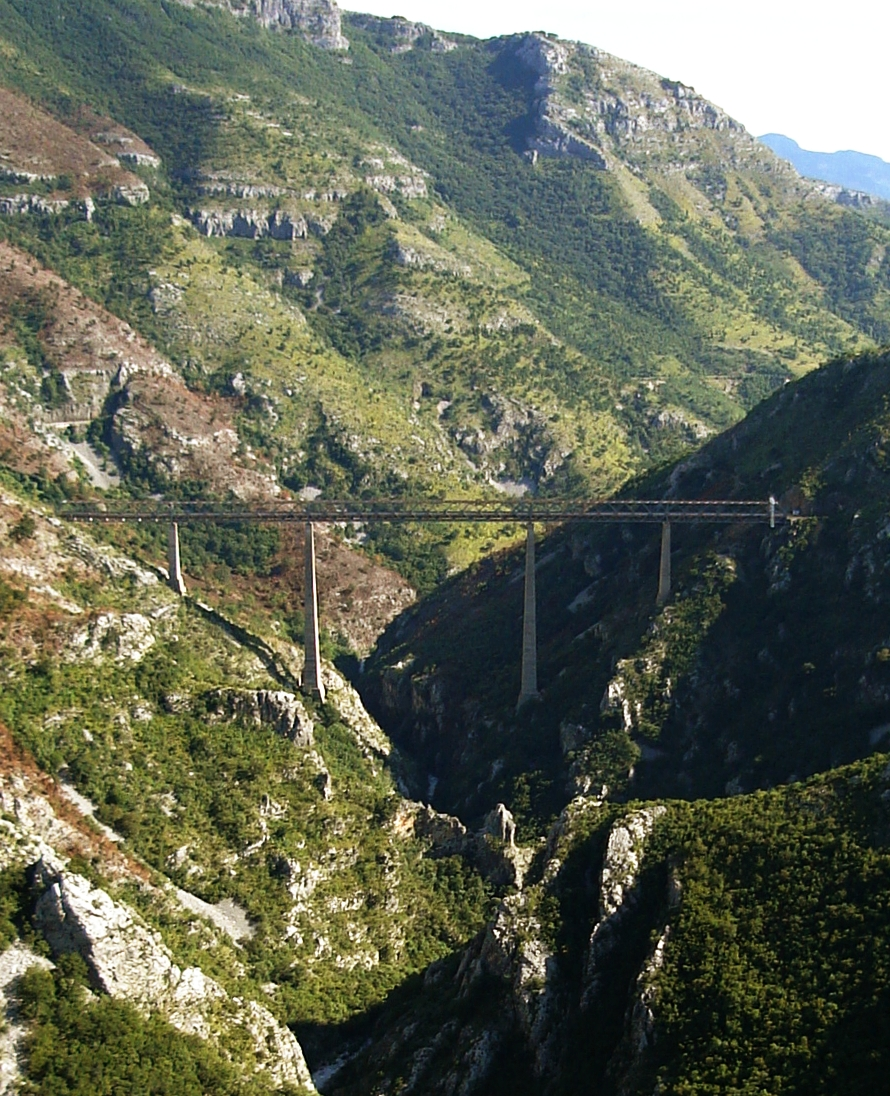
- Coordinates: 42°33′09″N 19°23′15″E
- Carries: 1 rail track
- Crosses: Valley of the Mala Rijeka River
- Locale: Near Bioče, Podgorica
- Official name: Мост изнад Мале Ријеке/Most iznad Male Rijeke

Characteristics
- Design: Truss bridge
- Material: Steel, concrete
- Total length: 498.8 m (1,636 ft)
- Height: 139 m (456 ft)
- Longest span: 150.8 m (495 ft)
- Clearance below: 198 m (650 ft)

History
- Designer: Ljubomir Jevtović (Engineers: Milivoje Kovačević, Milorad Luković and Milorad Marković)
- Constructed by: Mostogradnja
- Construction start: 1969
- Construction end: 1973
- Opened: 1973

The Mala Rijeka Viaduct (pronounced [mâːlaː rijɛ̌ka], literally Little river) is a viaduct on the Belgrade–Bar railway, located some 20 km north of Podgorica, Montenegro.

== Overview ==
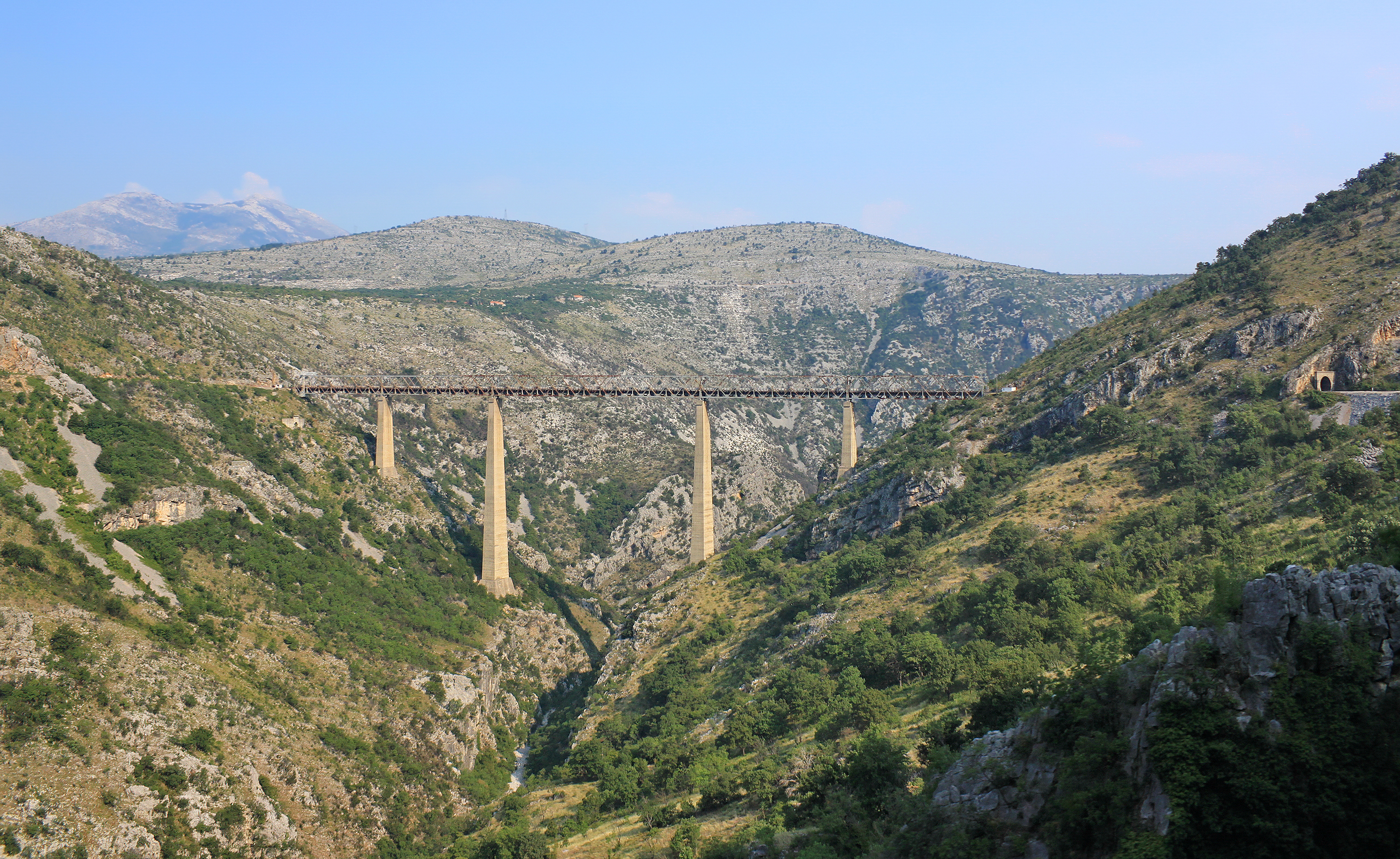
The Mala Rijeka Viaduct seen from the south

The project was started in 1969 and was completed in 1973. The viaduct is 498.8 metres (1,636 ft) long and at its highest is 200 metres (660 ft) above the Mala Rijeka River. It is also the longest bridge on the Belgrade–Bar railway.

When constructed it was the highest railway bridge in the world, surpassing the record height previously held by the Fades viaduct in France. It held the record until 2001 when the Beipan River Shuibai Railway Bridge, a concrete arch bridge, was completed in Guizhou, China. Multiple railway bridges under construction in China will also be higher.

== Construction ==
36,000 m^{3} of concrete and 100,000 tonnes of steel were built into the bridge. The largest of four pillars, upon which the bridge lies, has a base bigger than a tennis court.

Belgian extreme sportsman Cedric Dumont was the first person to jump from the bridge on 11 September 2008.

== See also ==
- List of tallest bridges
