= Rail transport in Montenegro =

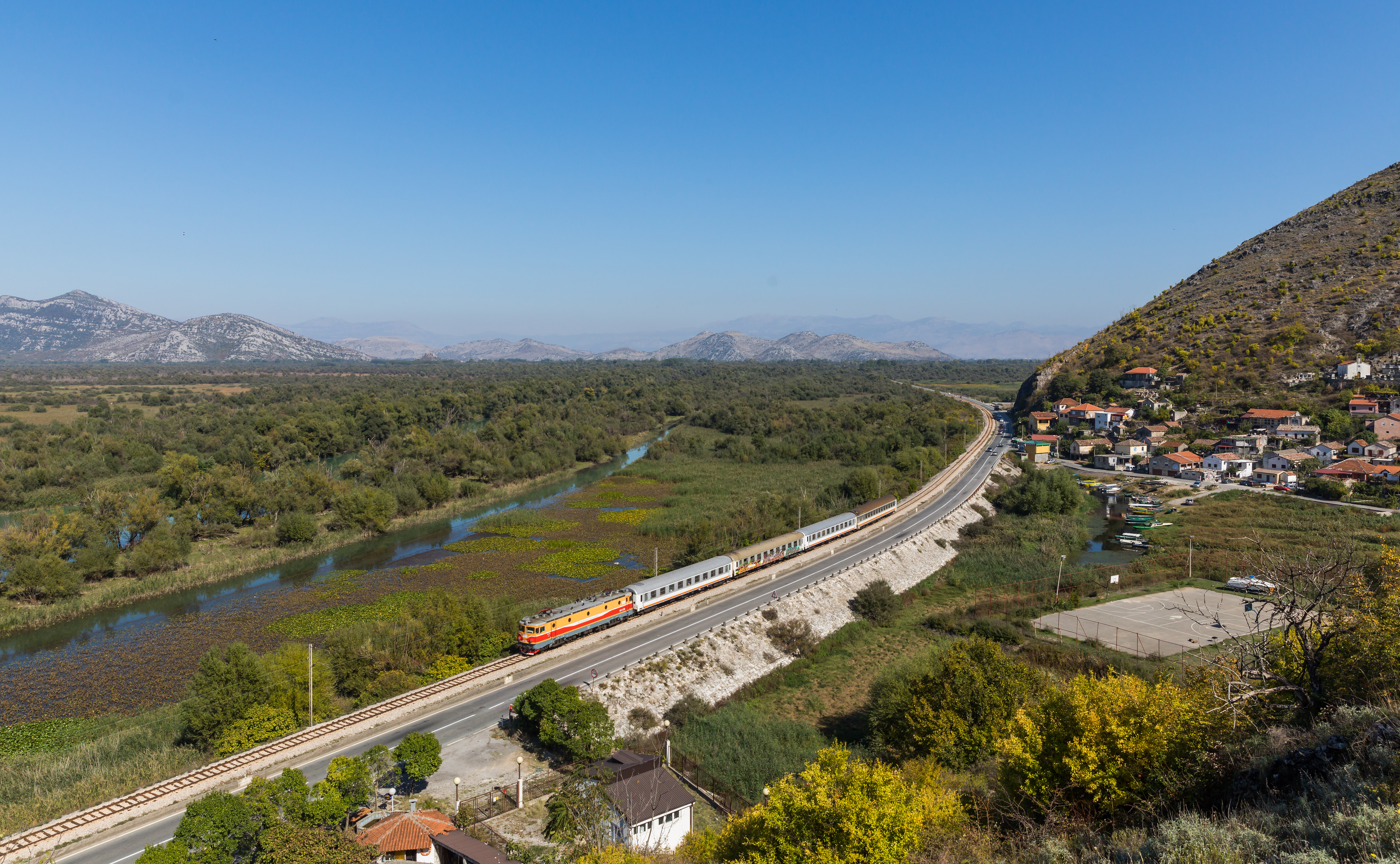
- A JŽ series 461 at Vranjina

Operation
- Infrastructure company: ŽICG
- Major operators: ŽPCG, Montecargo

System length
- Total: 250 km (155 mi)
- Electrified: 225 km (140 mi)

Track gauge
- Main: 1,435 mm (4 ft 8 1/2 in) (standard gauge)

Electrification
- Main: 25 kV, 50 Hz AC

Features
- No. of tunnels: 121
- Tunnel length: 58 km (36 mi)
- Longest tunnel: Sozina (6,170 m)
- No. of bridges: 120
- No. of stations: 7 stations, 41 stops
- Max elevation: 1,032 m AMSL (at Kolašin)
- Min elevation: 3 m AMSL (at Bar)
Map
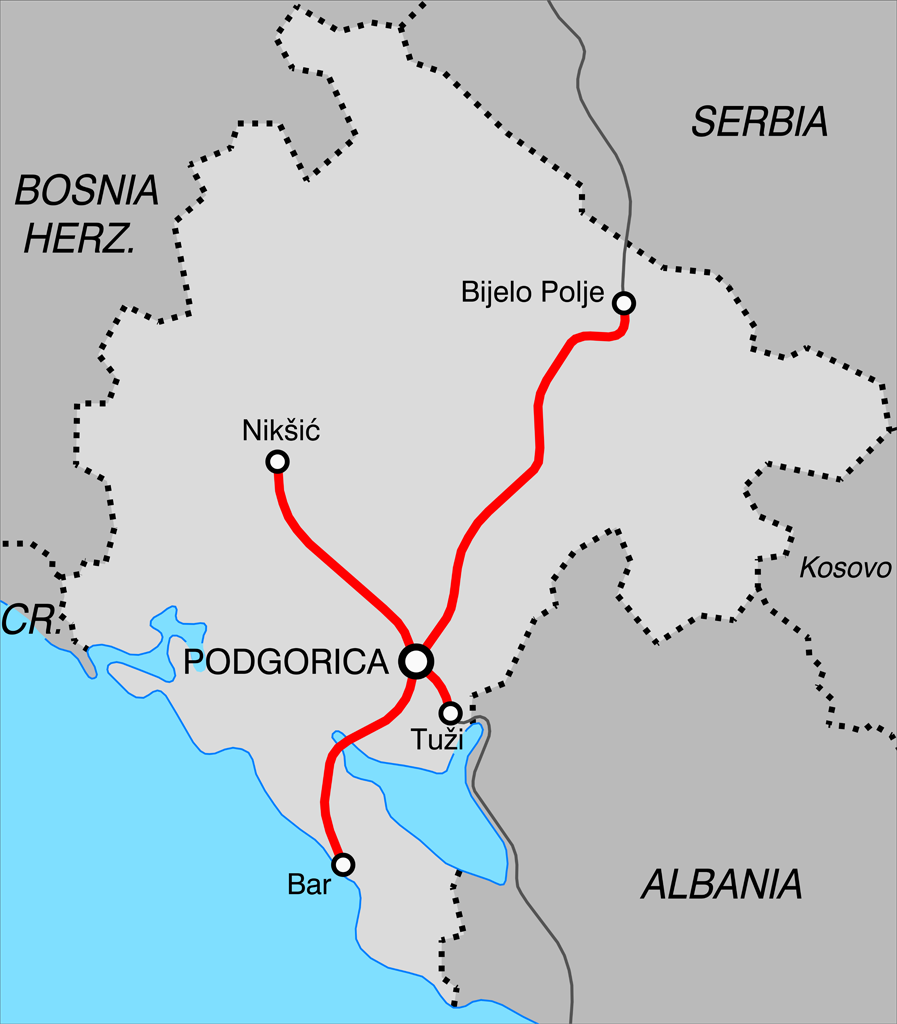

Rail transport in Montenegro is operated by four separate companies, which independently handle railway infrastructure, passenger transport, cargo transport and maintenance of the rolling stock. The four companies were a part of public company Railways of Montenegro (Montenegrin: Željeznica Crne Gore / Жељезница Црне Горе (ŽCG)) until it was split up in 2008.

Montenegro is an associate member of the International Union of Railways (UIC). The UIC Country Code for Montenegro is 62.

== Railway Infrastructure of Montenegro ==
Railway Infrastructure of Montenegro (Montenegrin: Жељезничка Инфраструктура Црне Горе / Željeznička Infrastruktura Crne Gore (ŽICG)) is a joint-stock company that handles operation and maintenance of the railway infrastructure in Montenegro.

=== History ===
The first railway line within the territory that today belongs to Montenegro was a narrow-gauge (760 mm (2 ft 5 15/16 in)) railway line Gabela - Zelenika, which opened in 1901. This railway line was built by Austria-Hungary, which governed the territory of Boka Kotorska at the time.

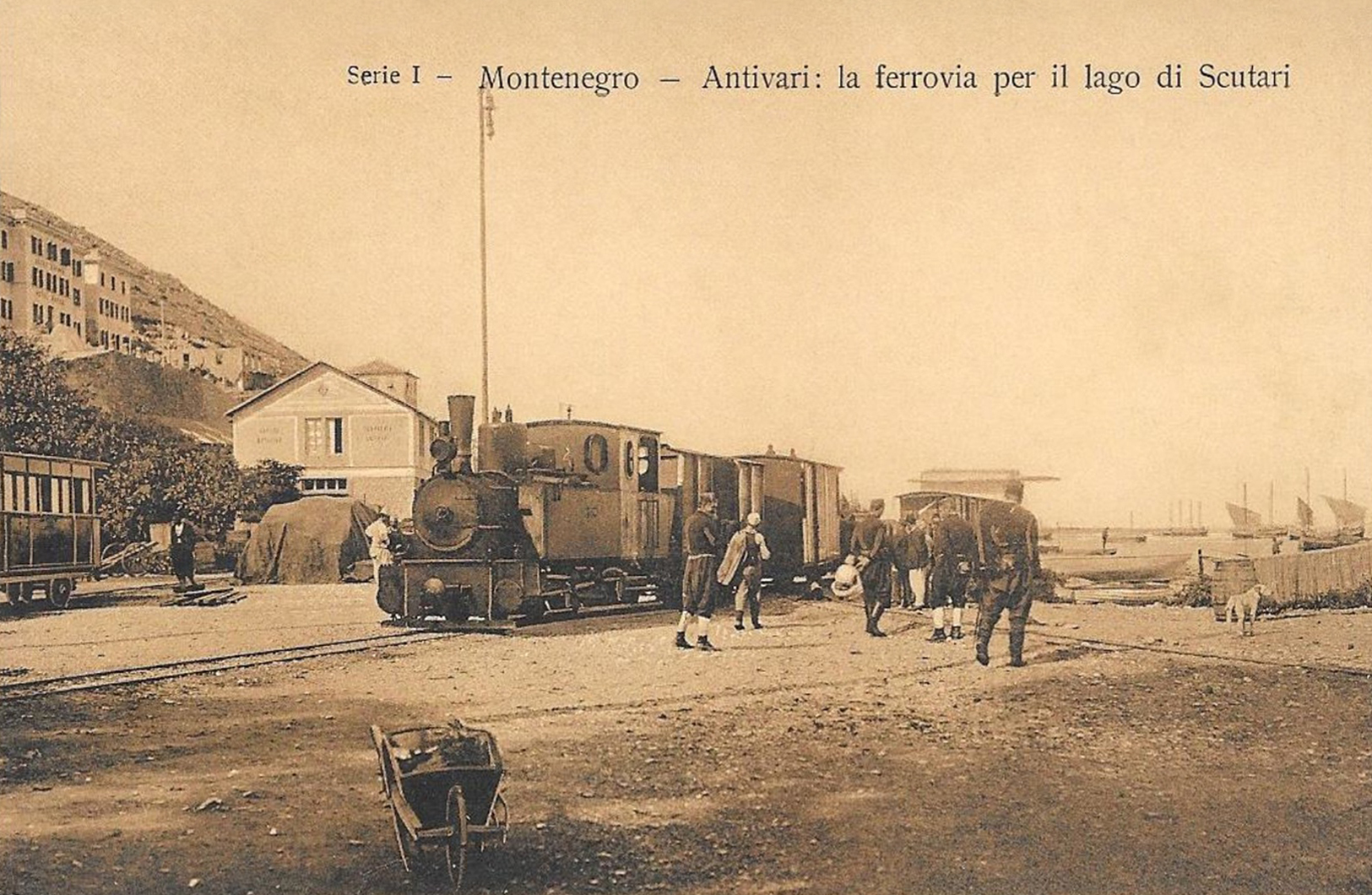
Station Bar and the railway to Virpazar in around 1910

However, the works on the first Montenegrin railway, the Bar - Virpazar line, begun in 1905. This was a narrow-gauge (750 mm (2 ft 5 1/2 in)) railway line, 43.3 km long, which opened in 1908. The extension of this line from Virpazar to Cetinje was planned, but never came through, due to lack of funding, and the beginning of the First World War. This historic mountain railway line overcame a rise of 670m over an 18 km run on the Sutorman mountain, with a maximum grade of 40‰. Despite the steep gradient, the railway was not using rack technology, due to the innovative route design by Italian engineers. The operating speeds on the line were 18 km/h for passenger transport, and 12 km/h for freight movement. In 2008, on the 100th anniversary of the line opening, and at the same time the anniversary of Montenegrin railways as a whole, it was planned to transfer the steam locomotive Lovćen from Podgorica Rail Station to Virpazar. This locomotive, which operated on the line, should become a part of a Montenegrin railway museum in Virpazar, which, due to lack of funds, never came through.

The railway network in Montenegro expanded during the period of Kingdom of Yugoslavia. In 1927, the Podgorica - Plavnica line (600 mm (1 ft 11 5/8 in)) was opened, followed by Bileća - Nikšić line in 1938. At that time, the railway network of Montenegro measured 143 km in length, with 760 mm (2 ft 5 15/16 in) narrow gauge as a most common standard. However, the railway network was not integrated, and 600 mm, 750 mm (2 ft 5 1/2 in) and 760 mm were present, additionally complicating the network operations. Multimodal transport was used for freight transport between Bar and Podgorica, as goods were transported by rail from Bar to Virpazar, then ferried across the Skadar Lake to Plavnica, followed by rail transport to Podgorica once again. Thus, it is fair to say that railway network in Montenegro was underdeveloped and unorganized prior to World War II.

Following World War II, the railway line Podgorica - Nikšić was completed (1948), with 760 mm (2 ft 5 15/16 in) gauge.

The first real advance towards modernisation of railway network was the start of construction of the Montenegrin section of Belgrade–Bar railway. The first section from Bar to Podgorica was completed in 1959, and this is the first section of standard gauge railway in Montenegro. At the same time, narrow gauge Podgorica - Plavnica and Bar - Virpazar lines were decommissioned.

In 1965, the Podgorica - Nikšić corridor was upgraded to standard gauge, thus standardizing the entire connection from Bar to Nikšić via Podgorica. The section from Nikšić to Bileća was decommissioned at the time, as well as the Gabela - Zelenika line.

The Montenegrin section of colossal Belgrade–Bar railway project (from Bar to Vrbnica, border with Serbia) was completed in 1976, connecting Bar and Podgorica with the northern Montenegro, Serbia, and European rail network. At that time, the length of Montenegrin railway network was 225 km, with transition to standard gauge complete.

The latest addition to the Montenegrin railways was Podgorica–Shkodër line, which opened in 1986. This was a freight-only line since its opening.

In 2012, Podgorica-Niksic railway was opened for passenger traffic after twenty years of absence. The line was modernised and electrified.

As of 2019, ZICG managed to modernise the northern part of the line the Belgrade-Bar railway between Bijelo Polje and Trebesice, and inside the Sozina tunnel.

Railway infrastructure of Montenegro Željeznička infrastruktura Crne Gore Жељезничка Инфраструктура Црне Горе
- Type: Government-owned
- Industry: Rail Transport
- Founded: 2008
- Headquarters: Podgorica, Montenegro
- Services: Rail Transport
- Website: https://www.zicg.me/

=== Overview ===
The total network is 250 kilometres long and is 1,435 mm (4 ft 8 1/2 in) (standard gauge) for its entire length, with 225 of them electrified at 25 kV, 50 Hz AC. Almost 58 km of lines are situated in 121 tunnels. There are also 120 bridges, 9 galleries and 440 culverts. The network consists of three railway lines that converge in Podgorica, making it a junction of Montenegrin X-shaped rail network.

- Belgrade–Bar railway is the backbone of the Montenegrin railway system. It opened in 1976, and then was a state-of-the art railway, with features such as Mala Rijeka viaduct (highest railway viaduct in Europe) and the 6.2 km long Sozina tunnel. About one-third of the Montenegrin part of the railway is in a tunnel or on a viaduct. It is the first railway corridor in Montenegro that was fully electrified. The railway has suffered from chronic underfunding in the 1990s, resulting in it deteriorating and becoming unsafe. This culminated in the 2006 Bioče train disaster, when a passenger train derailed, killing 47 passengers. Efforts are being made to thoroughly reconstruct this railway, with northern section of the railway already being completely overhauled. The European Investment Bank (EIB) agreed in January 2023 to provide finance of EUR 76 million for rail improvements on the Bar – Podgorica – Vrbnica rail line.
- The Nikšić–Podgorica railway (56,6 km long) was built in 1948 as narrow gauge railway, and upgraded to standard gauge in 1965. Since 1992, it has been used solely for freight traffic, particularly bauxite from the Nikšić mine to the Podgorica Aluminium Plant, with maximum speed on the railway reduced to 30 km/h. The railway was thoroughly reconstructed and electrified in 2006–2012 period, with passenger service reintroduced. Operating speeds on this railway are now in 75–100 km/h (47–62 mph) range.
- The Podgorica–Shkodër railway, which extends to Tirana, has been used exclusively for freight traffic since its opening. Parts in Albania were damaged in 1997, but the connection was restored in 2002. There are plans to reconstruct the railway and introduce passenger traffic, as it is important for interests of both Montenegro and Albania.

==== Rail links with adjacent countries ====
Montenegro only has passenger railway links with Serbia. The link with Albania is only in use for freight, although the 2022 EU plan Railway Route 2 that will connect the two countries and their ports at Bar and Durres to the EU rail network within five years. There are currently no railway connections with Bosnia and Herzegovina and Croatia since the breakup of Yugoslavia.

== Railway transport of Montenegro ==
Railway transport of Montenegro Željeznički prevoz Crne Gore Жељезнички превоз Црне Горе
- Type: Government-owned
- Industry: Rail Transport
- Founded: 2008
- Headquarters: Podgorica, Montenegro
- Services: Rail Transport, Services
- Website: https://zpcg.me/

Railway transport of Montenegro (Montenegrin: Жељезнички превоз Црне Горе / Željeznički prevoz Crne Gore (ŽPCG)) is a joint-stock company that handles passenger transport within Montenegro, as well as operation of the Montenegrin rolling stock.

Current rolling stock of Montenegrin Railways

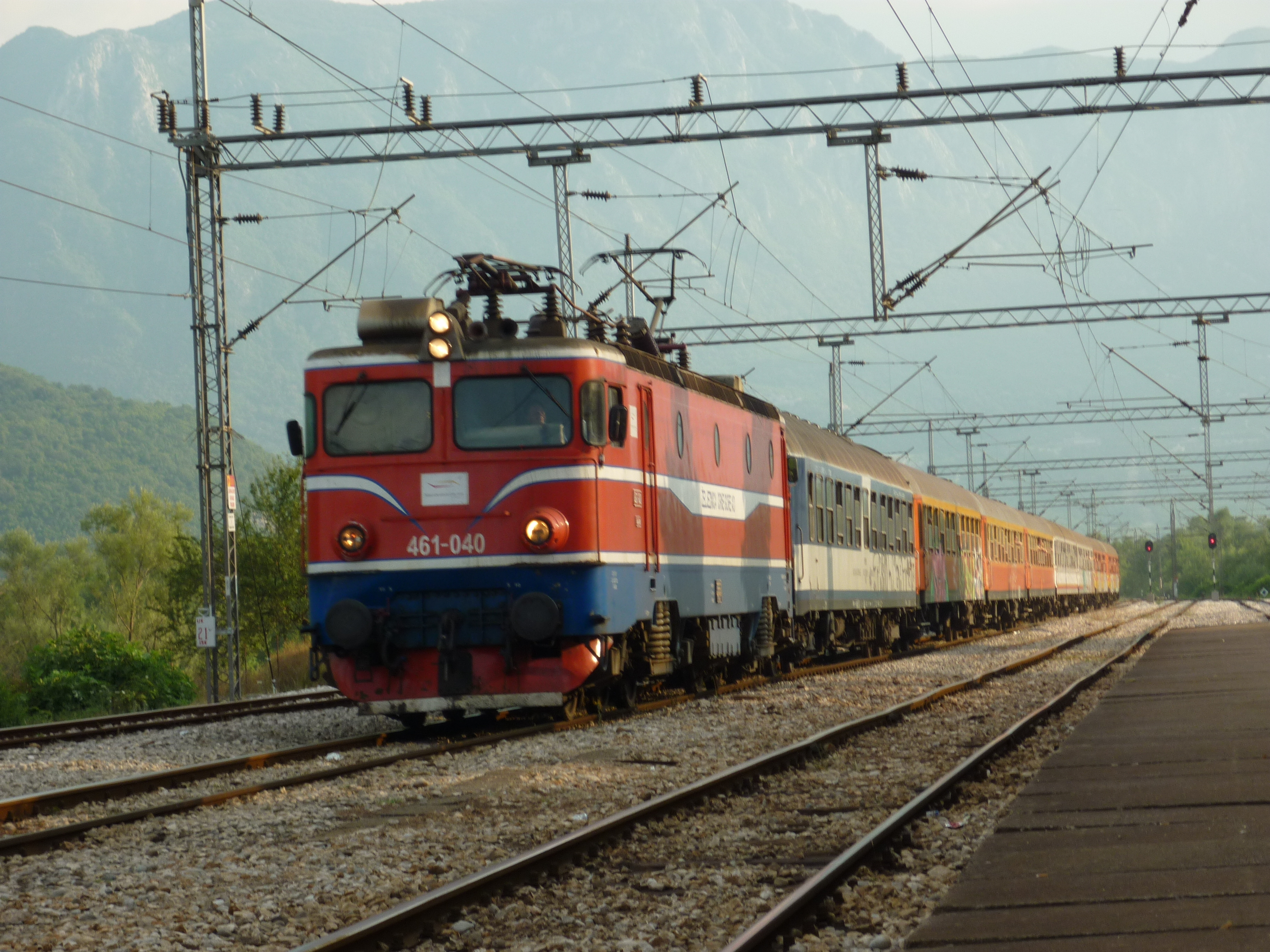
Former JŽ class 461 passing through Virpazar on the Belgrade-Bar line.

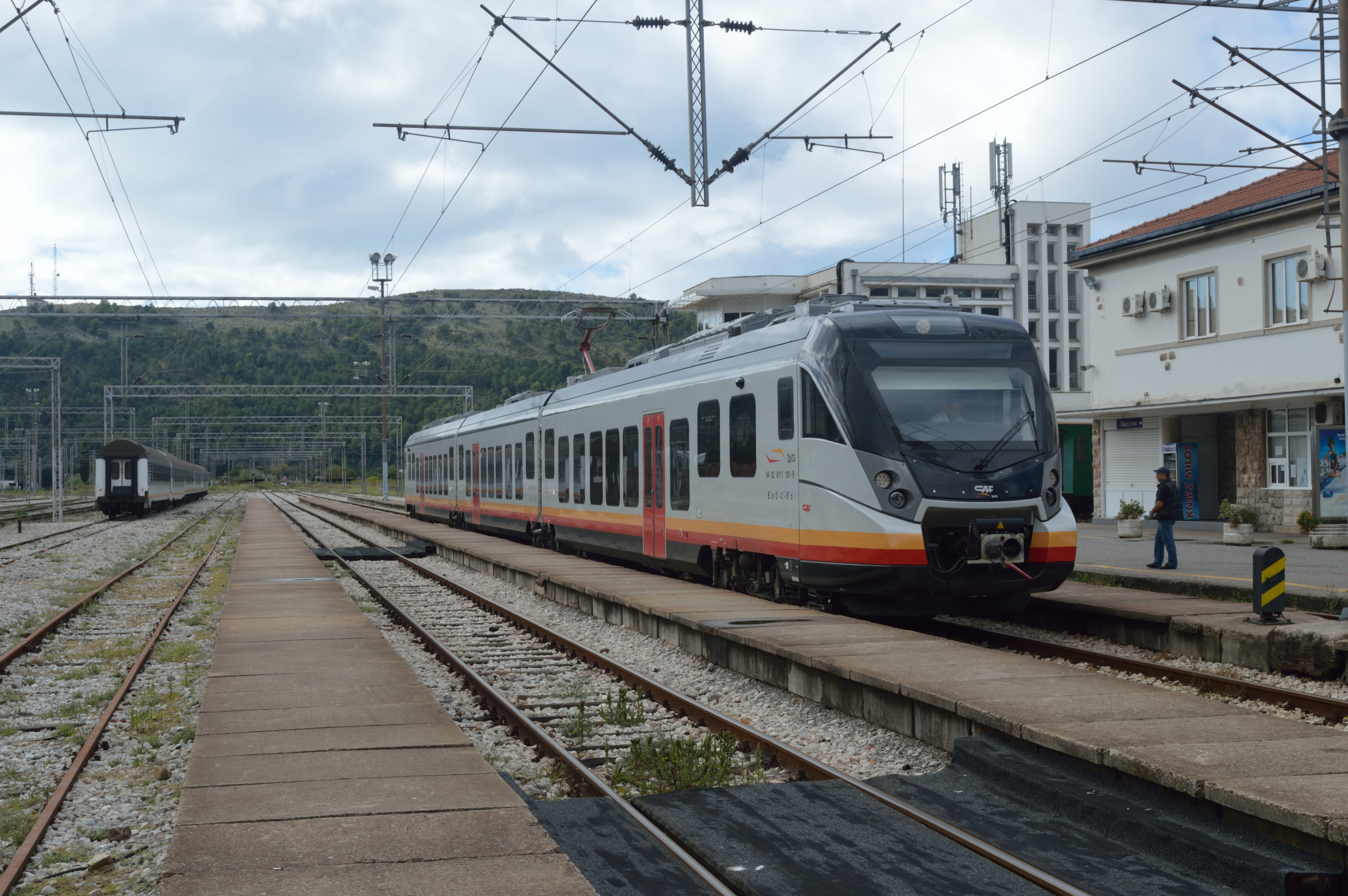
CAF Civity class 6111 EMU at Bar station.

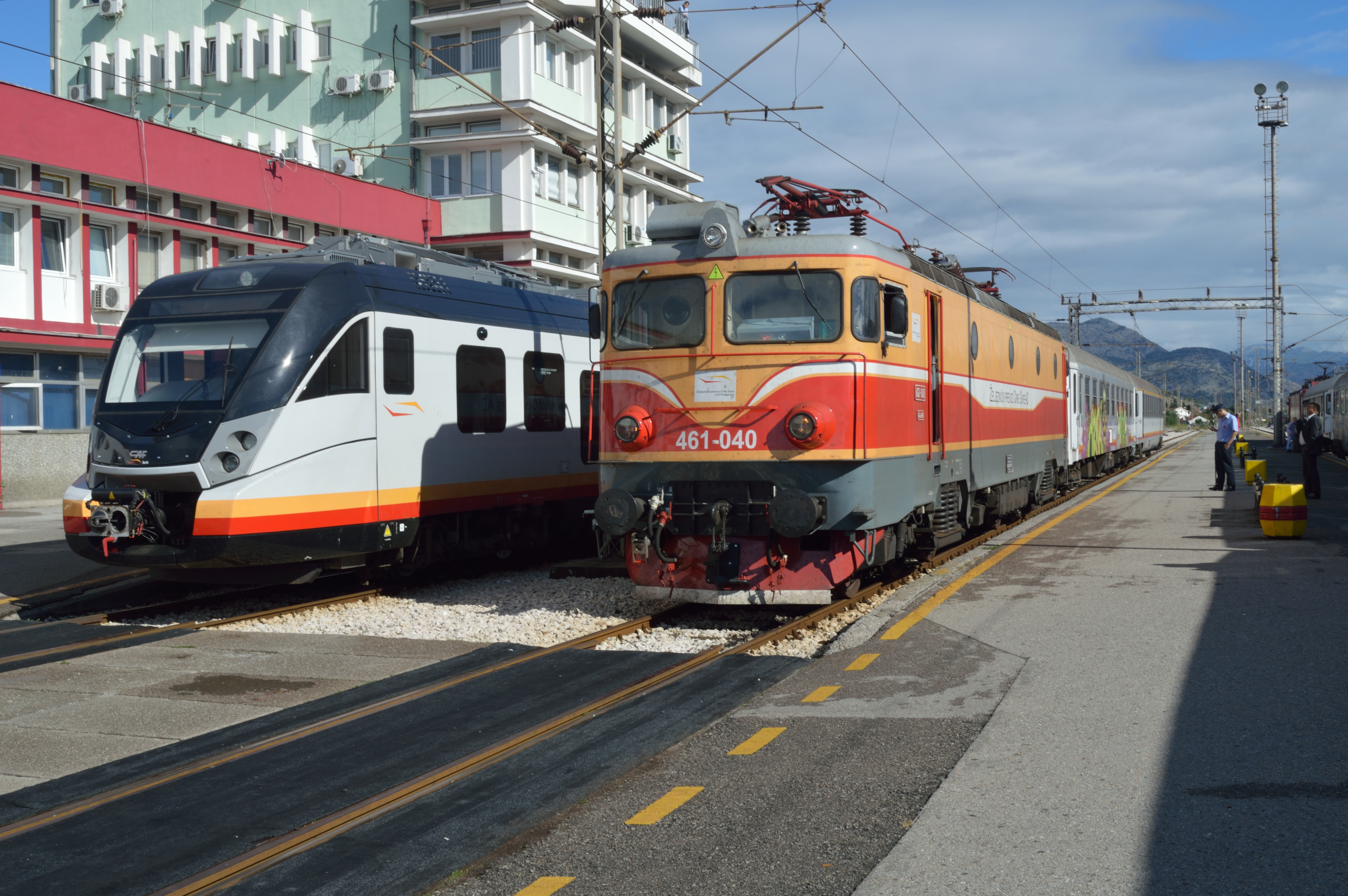
New CAF Civity next to passenger train hauled by older former JŽ class 461.

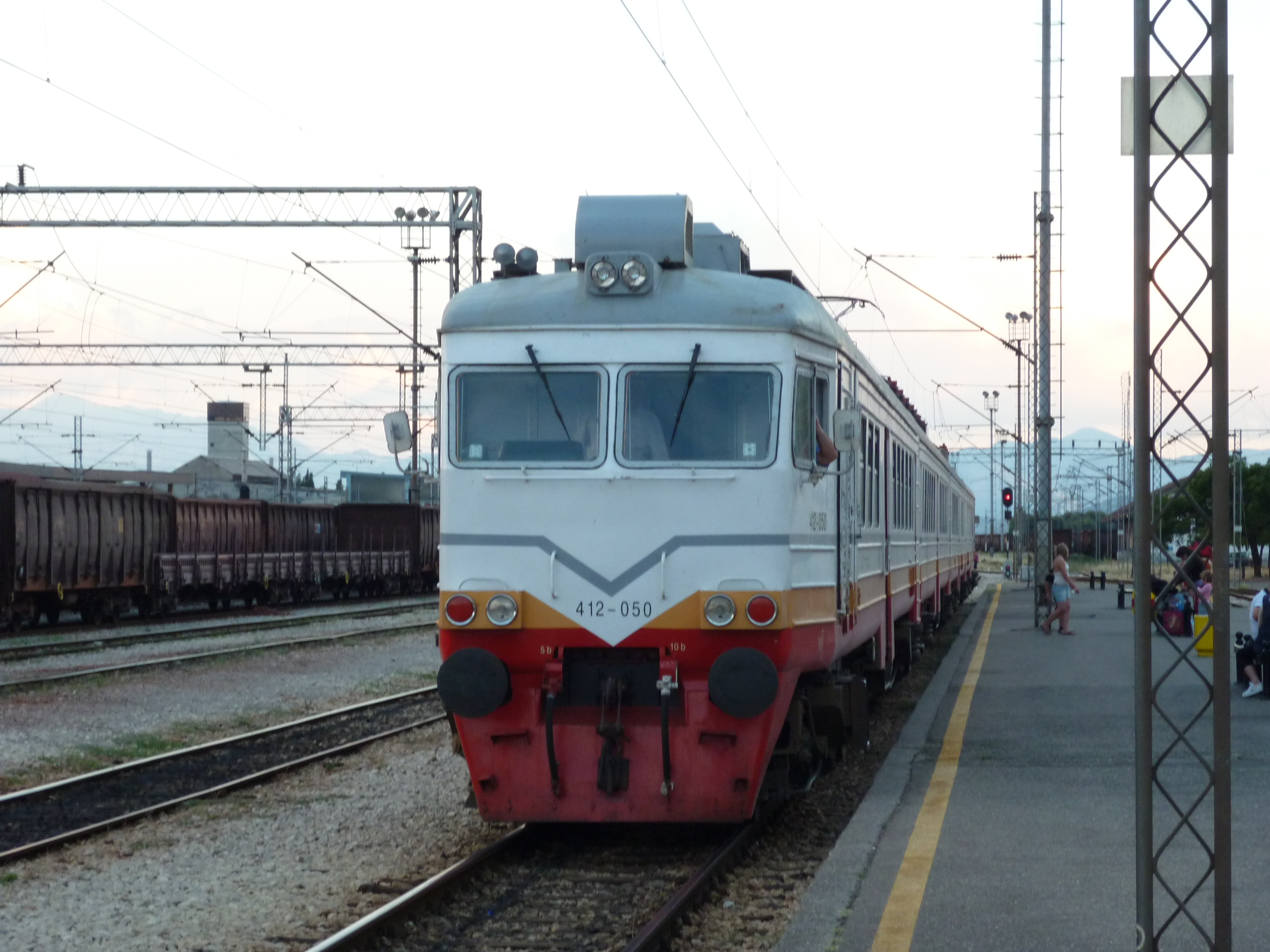
ŽS series 412/416 EMU of ŽPCG in new livery in Podgorica station.

== Montecargo ==
Montecargo Montecargo
- Type: Government-owned
- Industry: Freight rail transport
- Founded: 2008
- Headquarters: Podgorica, Montenegro
- Services: Freight rail transport
- Revenue: 10 million EUR (2010)
- Net income: 1,5 million EUR (2010)
- Number of employees: 209
- Website: https://www.montecargo.me/

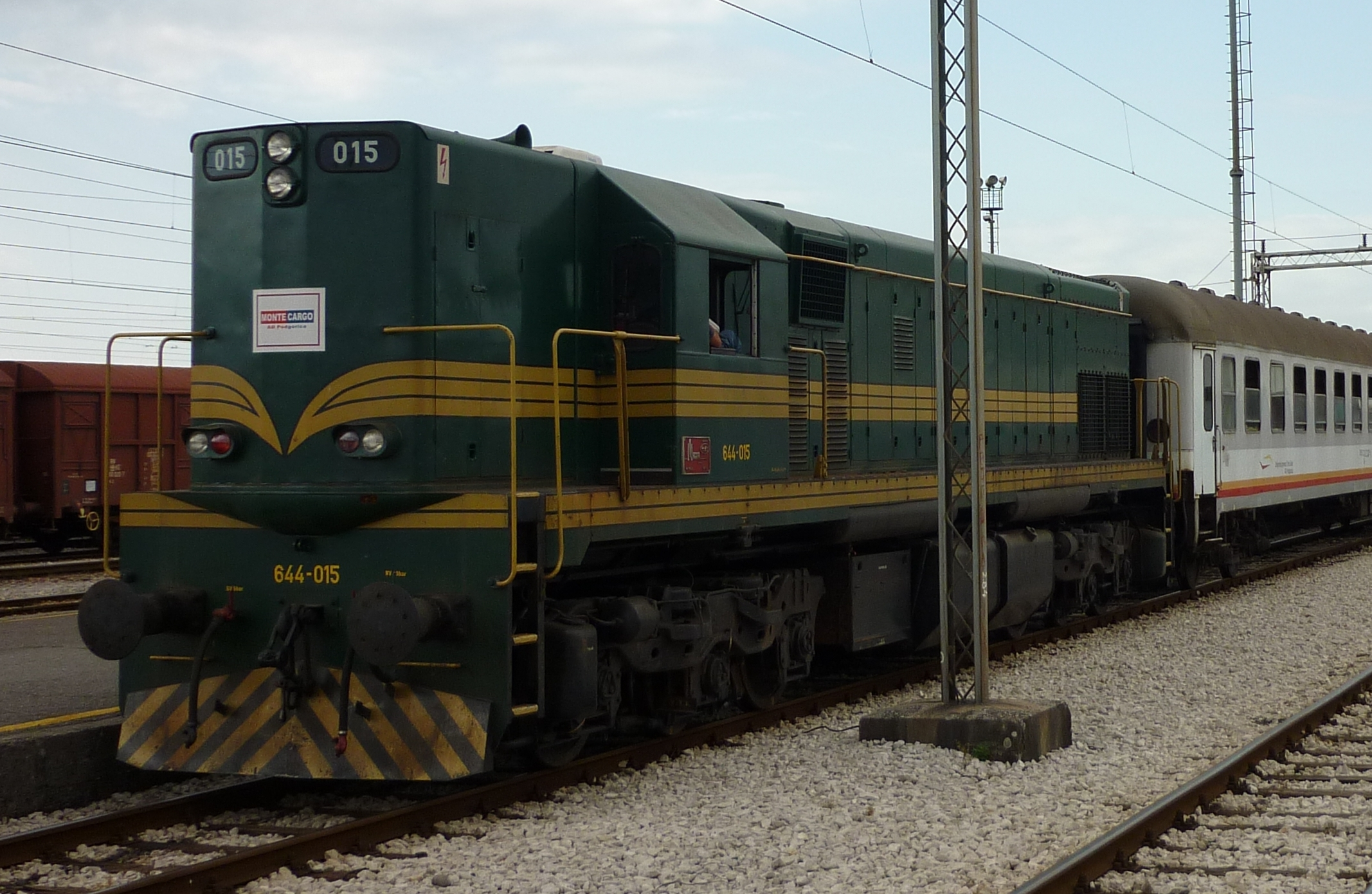
MONTECARGO 644-015 shunting at Podgorica station

Montecargo (Montenegrin: Montecargo) is a company that handles freight transport within Montenegro, as well as operation of the Montenegrin goods wagons and freight locomotives.

Rolling stock of Montecargo consists of 17 locomotives (15 active) and 713 freight wagons:

- 8 locomotives of class JŽ 461
- 3 locomotives of class JŽ 661
- 4 locomotives of class JŽ 644
- 2 locomotives of class JŽ 744 (none of them are active)

== Rolling stock maintenance ==
Rolling stock maintenance Održavanje željezničkih voznih sredstava Одржавање жељезничких возних средстава
- Type: Government-owned
- Industry: Rail Transport
- Founded: 2010
- Headquarters: Podgorica, Montenegro
- Services: Rail Transport, Services
- Website: https://ozvs.me/

Rolling stock maintenance (Montenegrin: Održavanje željezničkih voznih sredstava / Одржавање жељезничких возних средстава (OŽVS)) is a joint-stock company that handles maintenance of the Montenegrin passenger and freight rolling stock. It was a part of Railway transport of Montenegro company, but was split into separate company in 2011.

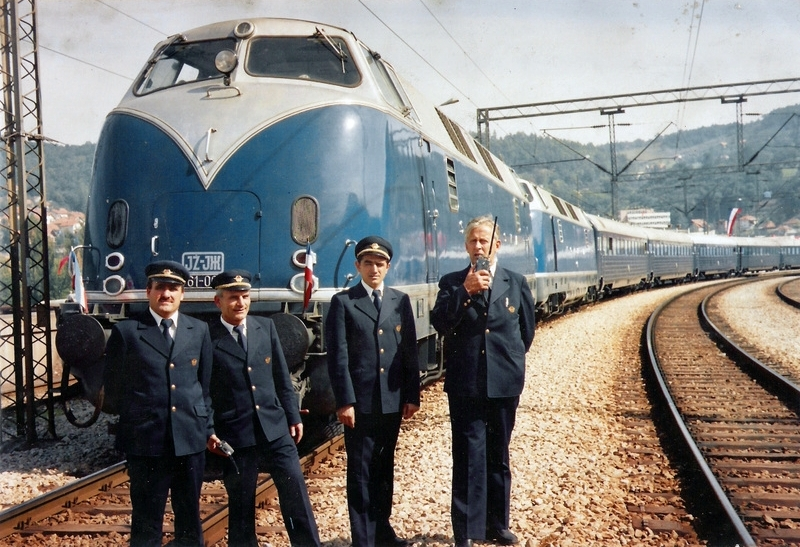
Tito's Blue Train on 28 May 1976, at the opening of the final section of the Belgrade–Bar railway with two Krauss-Maffei JŽ D66/761

== Railways of Montenegro in fiction ==
James Bond travels on the railways of Montenegro in Casino Royale. The actual train seen in the movie is the Pendolino tilting train of Czech Railways.

== Preservation ==
Josip Broz Tito's Blue Train used the JŽ class 11, JŽ D66/761 (DB Class V 200 based), and later JŽ class 666 (EMD JT22CW-2) locomotives. It is now operated on the Bar - Belgrade line as a tourist attraction.

== See also ==
- Transport in Montenegro
- Belgrade–Bar railway
- Tito's Blue Train
- Serbian Railways
