= Belgrade–Bar railway =

Railway line in Serbia, Bosnia and Herzegovina and Montenegro

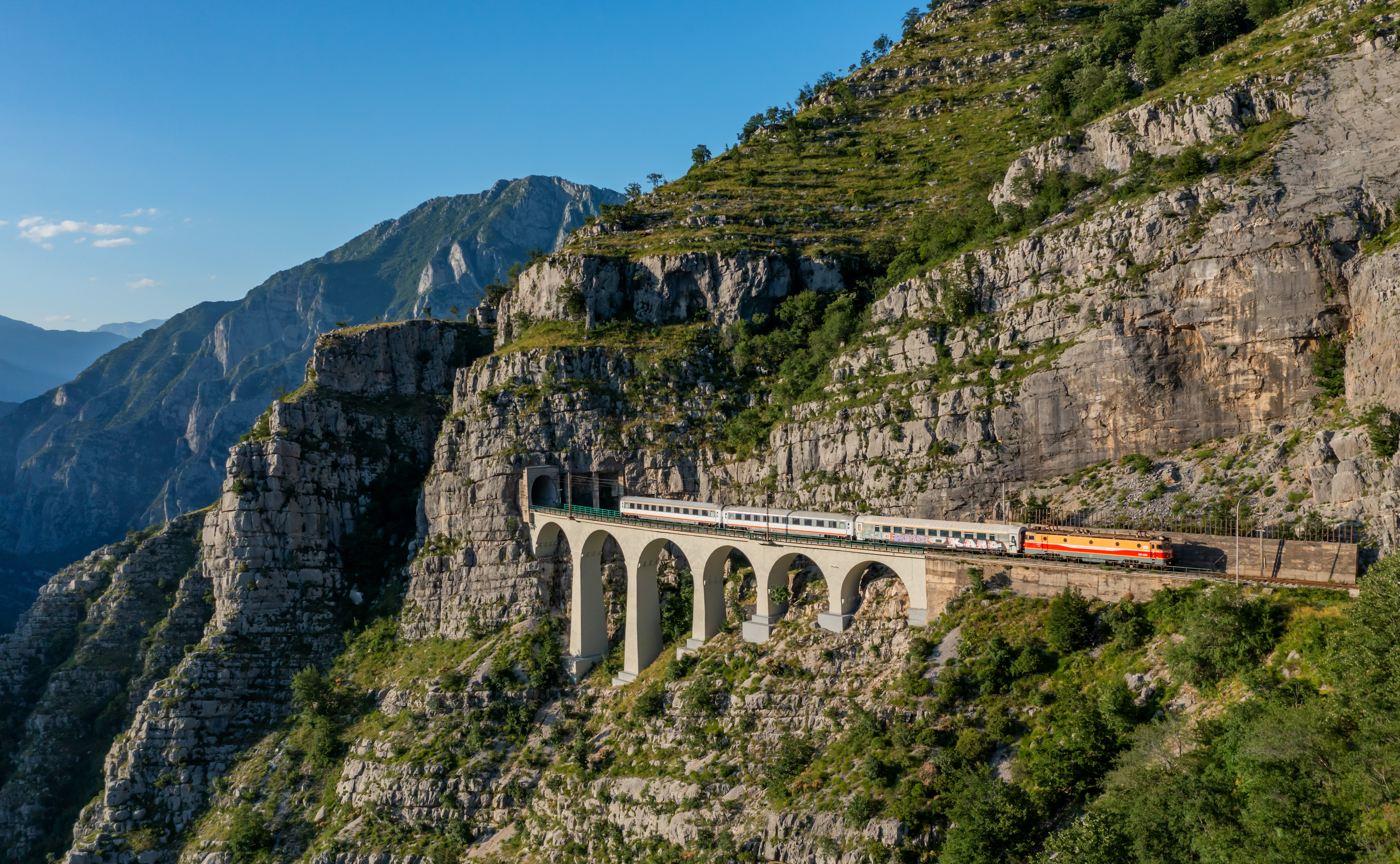
- ŽCG 461 039 at Lutovo station

Overview
- Status: Active
- Owner: Serbian Railways, ŽICG
- Termini: Belgrade; Bar

Service
- Route number: 108 (ŽS)
- Operator(s): Serbian Railways, ŽPCG

History
- Opened: 1976

Technical
- Line length: 476.59 km (296 mi)
- Number of tracks: 1
- Track gauge: 1,435 mm (4 ft 8 1/2 in) standard gauge
- Minimum radius: 300 m (984 ft)
- Electrification: 25 kV, 50 Hz AC
- Operating speed: 70 km/h (43 mph) (currently); 75 km/h (47 mph)–120 km/h (75 mph) (designed)

The Belgrade–Bar railway (Serbian: Пруга Београд–Бар, Pruga Beograd–Bar) is a 476.59 km (296.14 mi) long electrified main line connecting the Serbian capital of Belgrade with the city of Bar, a major seaport in Montenegro. Completed in 1976, it connects Belgrade with the Mediterranean port of Bar. It was built by the Yugoslav State Railways (JŽ) in 25 years of construction and is now operated by its successor companies Železnice Srbije (ŽS), Željeznice Republike Srpske (ŽRS) and Željeznička Infrastruktura Crne Gore (ŽICG).

The mountain railway crosses three mountain ranges in the Dinaric Mountains and has its highest point at 1,032 m (3,386 ft) south of this, the maximum gradient of the route is 25 ‰, north of it 17 ‰. The route in the difficult terrain required 254 tunnels and over 243 bridges. The route is considered one of the most difficult in Europe.

The connection from the Serbian capital to the Adriatic coast was one of the major railway projects in Europe in the second half of the 20th century. At the time, it was considered the most important railway construction project after the Second World War and the most expensive infrastructure project of the Socialist Federal Republic of Yugoslavia. At present, it is Serbia's shortest connection to a Mediterranean port and Montenegro's only international passenger transport connection. Albania has also been connected to the European railway network via the branch line Podgorica–Shkodra since 1986. From the opening of the line until 2018, the Belgrade Main station was the starting point for trains to Montenegro; since 2021, all trains have departed from Belgrade Centre station.

== Overview ==
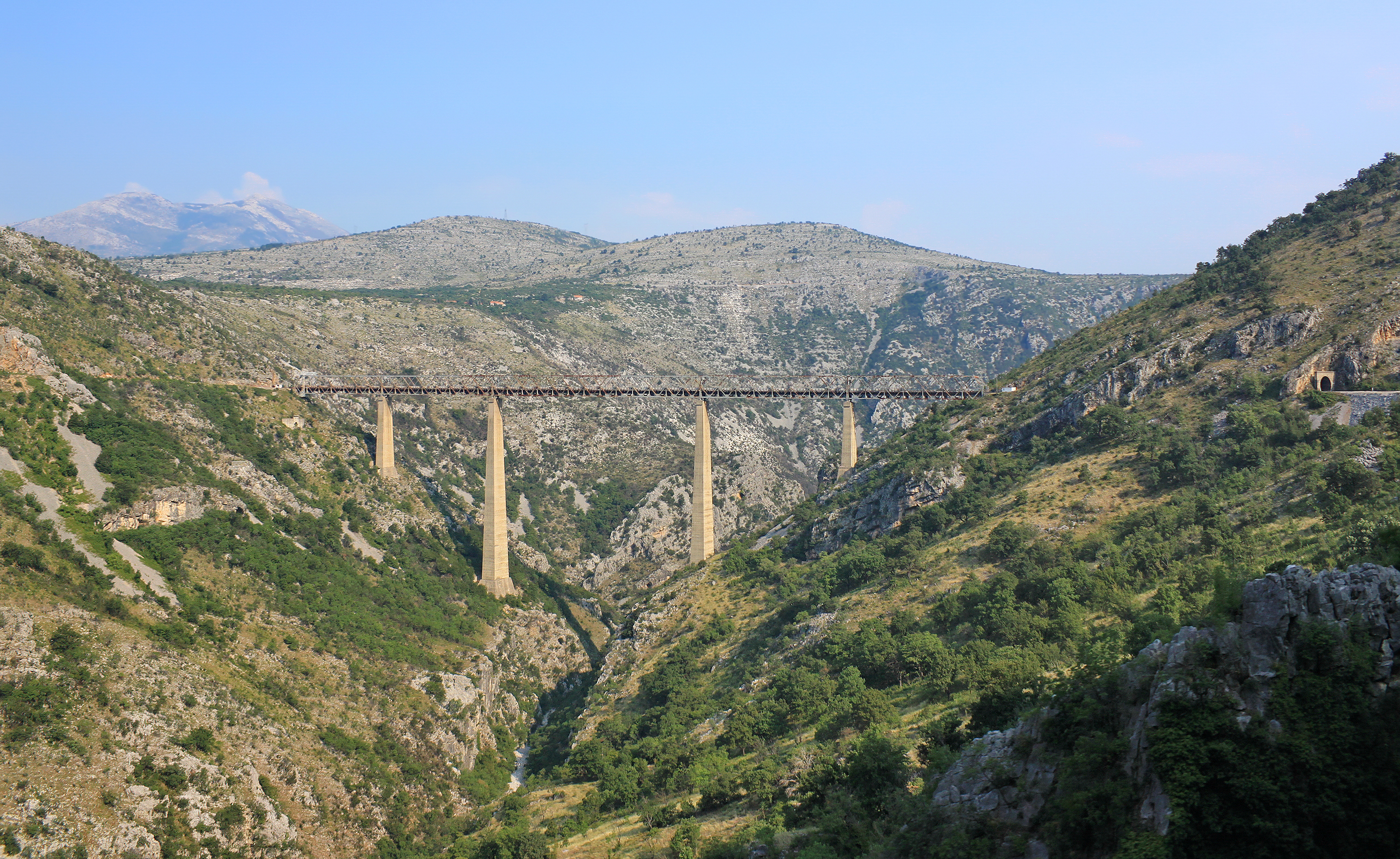
Mala Rijeka Viaduct

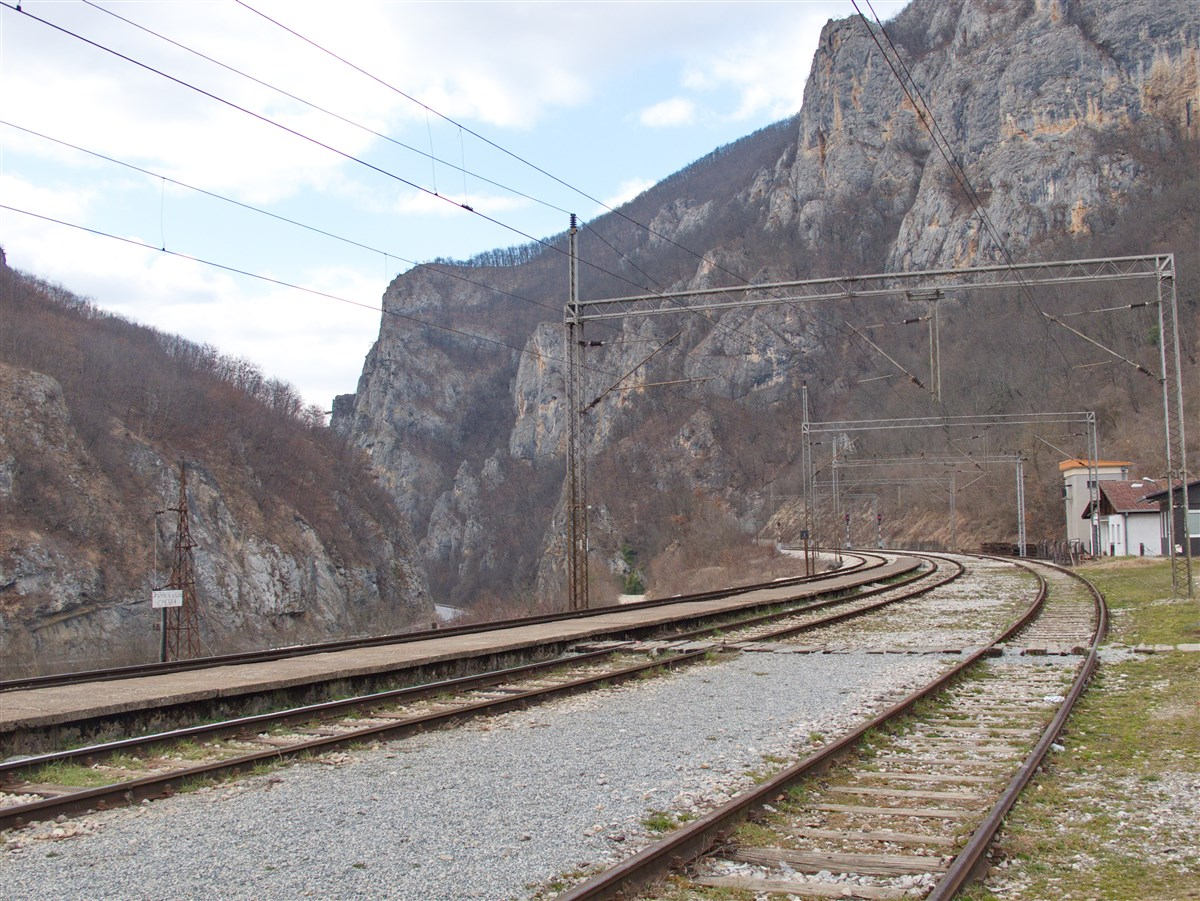
Pester Plateau, Serbia on the Belgrade-Bar railway.

The Belgrade–Bar railway is 476 kilometres (296 mi) long, of which 301 km (187 mi) is in Serbia and 175 km (109 mi) is in Montenegro. It is standard gauge and electrified with 25 kV, 50 Hz AC for its entire length. It passes through 254 tunnels of total length of 114,435 m (375,443 ft) and over 435 bridges (total length 14,593 m (47,877 ft)). The longest tunnels are "Sozina" (6.17 km or 3.83 mi), and "Zlatibor" (6.169 km or 3.833 mi). The biggest and the best-known bridge is Mala Rijeka Viaduct, 498 metres (1,634 ft) long and 198 m (650 ft) above ground level.

The highest point of the railway is 1,032 m (3,386 ft) above mean sea level, at the town of Kolašin. The railway descends to 40 m (130 ft) above mean sea level at Podgorica in a relatively short distance, resulting in a gradient of 25‰ on this section.

A short 9 km (6 mi) section of the railway passes through Bosnia and Herzegovina, where there is a station at Štrpci.

When the line was completed in the late 1970s, the trip between Belgrade and Bar took approximately 7 hours. Today, the same trip takes around 11 hours due to speed restrictions necessitated by poor track conditions and border controls at Bijelo Polje.

== Stations ==
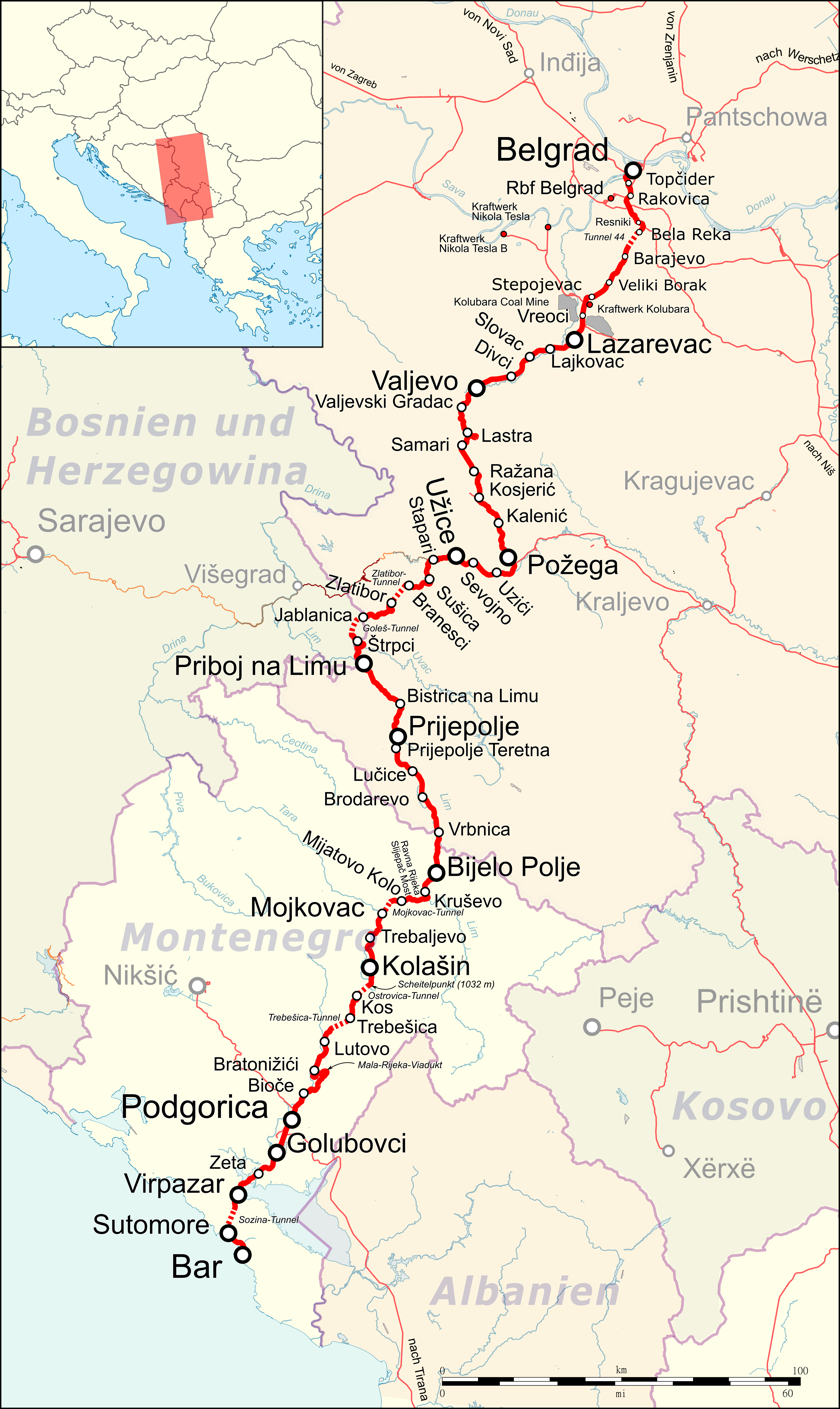
Geographical map of the railway

== History ==
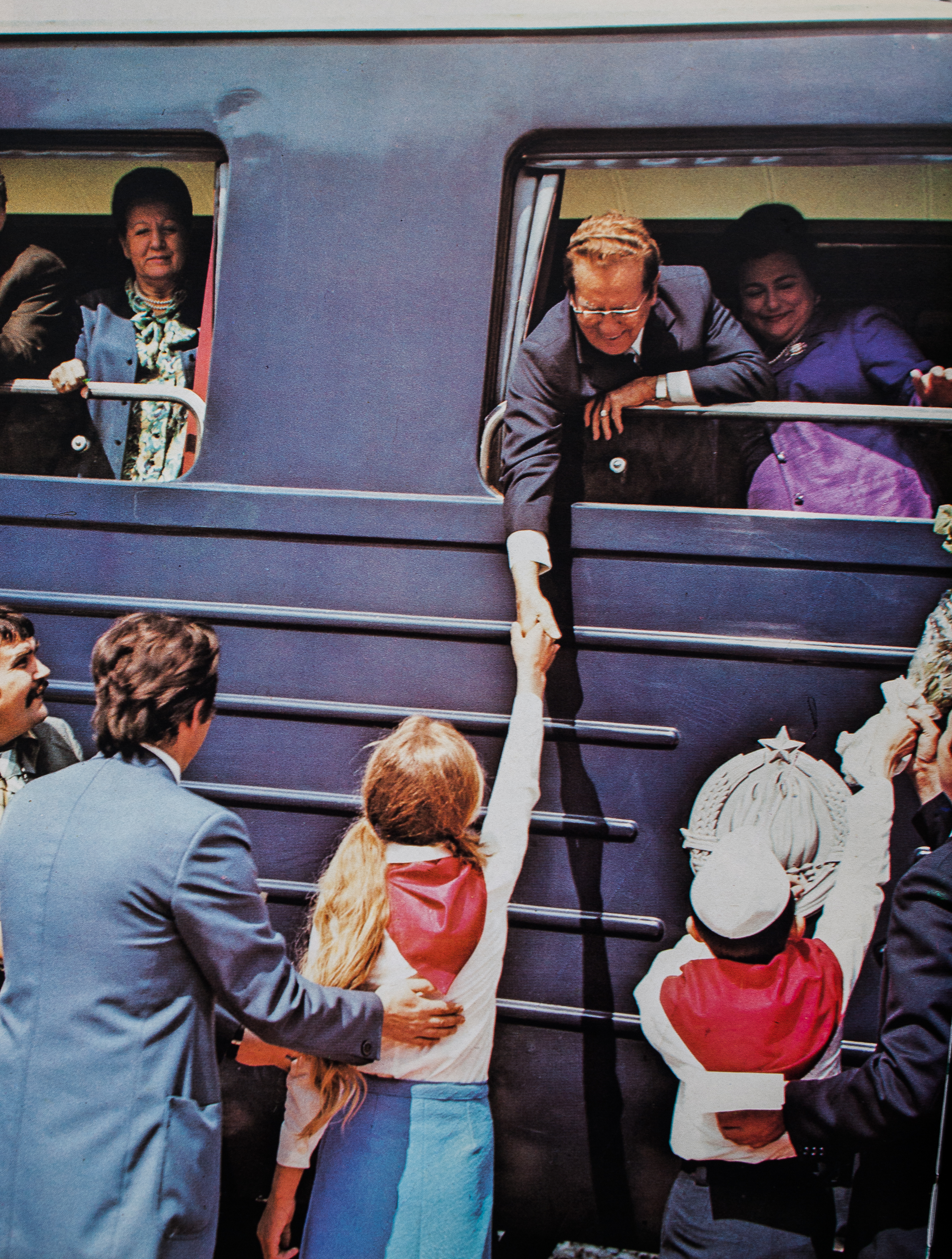
President of Yugoslavia Josip Broz Tito and First Lady Jovanka Broz at the opening of the railway in 1976 on Tito's Blue Train.

The decision to build the railway connection between Belgrade and Bar was made in 1952, as a national project of the Socialist Federal Republic of Yugoslavia. However, the construction was passed to the constituent Republics, SR Serbia and SR Montenegro, to build on their own.

The sections of the railway were completed as follows:

- Resnik – Vreoci in 1958
- Podgorica – Bar in 1959
- Vreoci – Valjevo in 1968
- Valjevo – Užice in 1972
- Užice – Podgorica in 1976

The construction works were concluded on 27 November 1975, by joining the railway tracks south of Kolašin. The railway was opened on 28 May 1976. Electrification was completed at the end of 1977.

In February 1993, during the Yugoslav Wars, short Bosnian section of the railway was the site of the Štrpci massacre. Maintenance of the Belgrade–Bar railway suffered from chronic underfunding during the 1990s, which has resulted in the railway deteriorating and becoming unsafe. This culminated in the Bioče derailment, when a passenger train derailed, causing the deaths of 47 passengers. As a result, efforts are being made to thoroughly reconstruct the railway.

The Serbian part of the railway was targeted several times by NATO during its bombing campaign in 1999, seriously damaging portions of the railway. Also, the small section that passes through Bosnia and Herzegovina was blown up by SFOR ground forces. All of this damage was later repaired.

In 2016, Serbia started a thorough reconstruction of its portion of the line in order to restore its original maximum speed of 120 kilometres per hour (75 mph). The first section, between Belgrade and Valjevo (27% of the Serbian part of the line) was completed in 2017, with speeds of up to 120 km/h, however Serbian Railways Infrastructure later stated trains reached speeds of 100 km/h, causing some confusion as to what the maximum speed actually is.

== Present status ==
Traffic continues to operate on this line today, but due to its long-standing lack of maintenance, on certain sections through Serbia the speed limit is 30 km/h. On the Montenegrin part of the line, the maximum permitted speed is 50 to 80 km/h.

== In popular culture ==
The railway line and its construction were the subject of interpretations from the folk music genre in Yugoslavia, particularly in the 1960s and 1970s, such as by Lepa Lukić (Brzi voz Beograd Bar and Beograde, Bar te zove), or the Braća Bajići (Sitan kamen do kamena). In the latter song, meters from the Starogradska Muzika and the Kolos with the sounds of the gusle represent the symbolic connection between the republics. The same was true of Dragan Antić's record Pruga Beograd–Bar, on which, of the four songs, the number Jadran Ekspres began with the solo singing of a guslar. Antić's album, like Lepa Lukić's album of the same name, was released on the Yugoslav major label RTB (Radio Televizija Beograd – today's RTS). These albums were financed by the Yugoslav Investment Bank and featured identical covers with the railway line, once in blue and once in red.

The last train to leave the Beograd-Glavna station, on 15 June 2018, was bid farewell at the station by playing the cult hit A sad adio. The Serbian media spoke of the end of an era, and the locomotive driver of the last journey said goodbye to the station and the waiting passengers with a siren. In 2024, the Croatian film The Man Who Could Not Remain Silent by Nebojša Slijepčević covered the 1993 war crime at the Bosnian section of the railway.

== Gallery ==
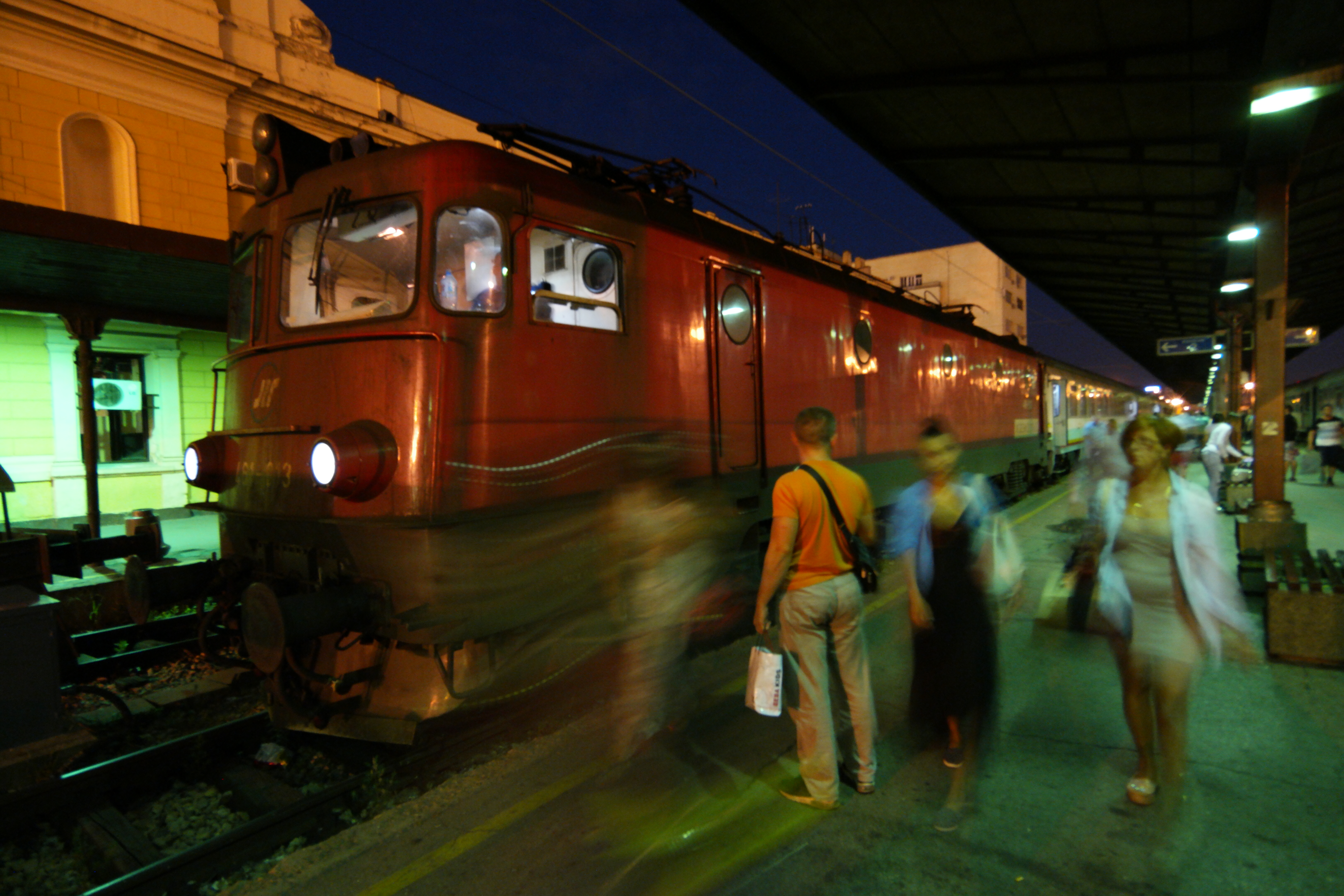
A ŽS 461 arriving at the Former Belgrade Main railway station, August 2016.

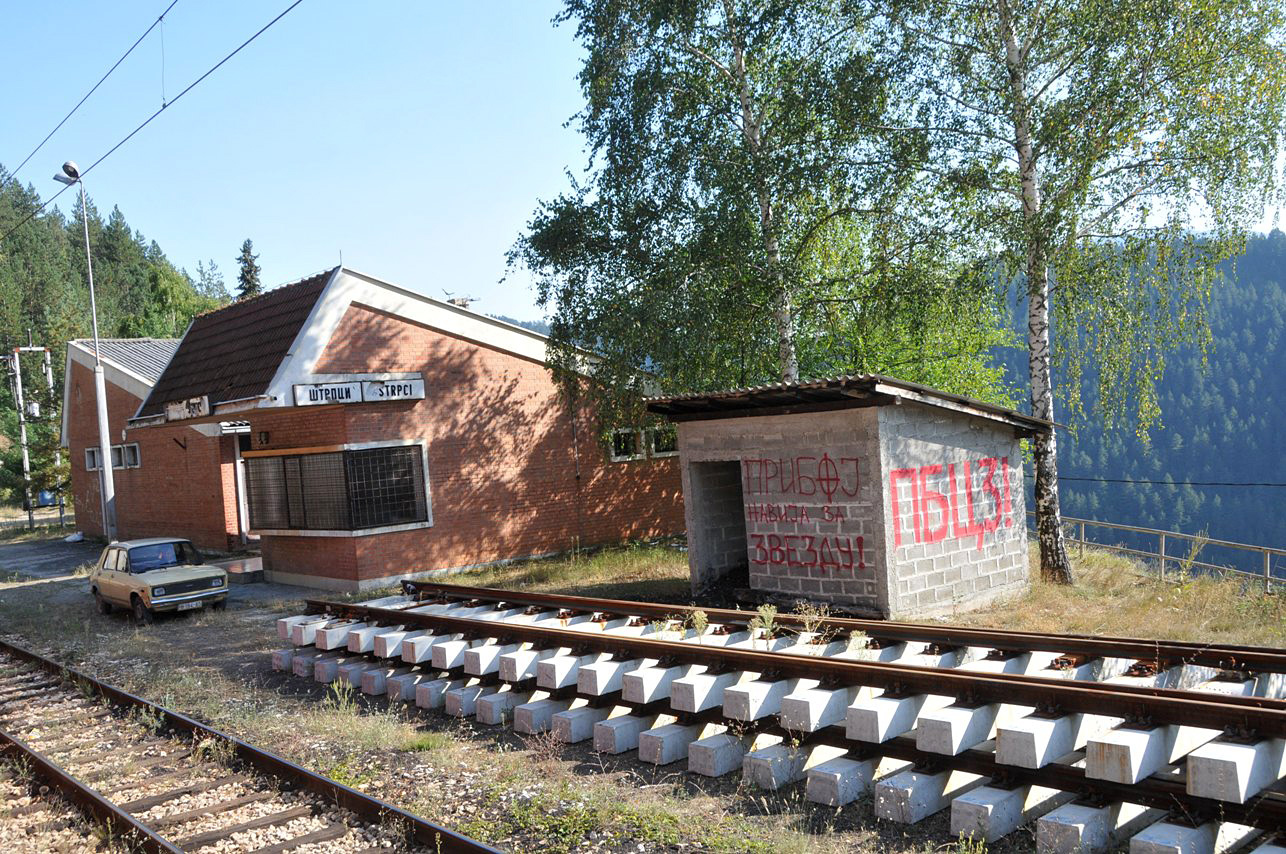
Štrpci railway station, on the small section in Bosnia and Herzegovina, August 2010.

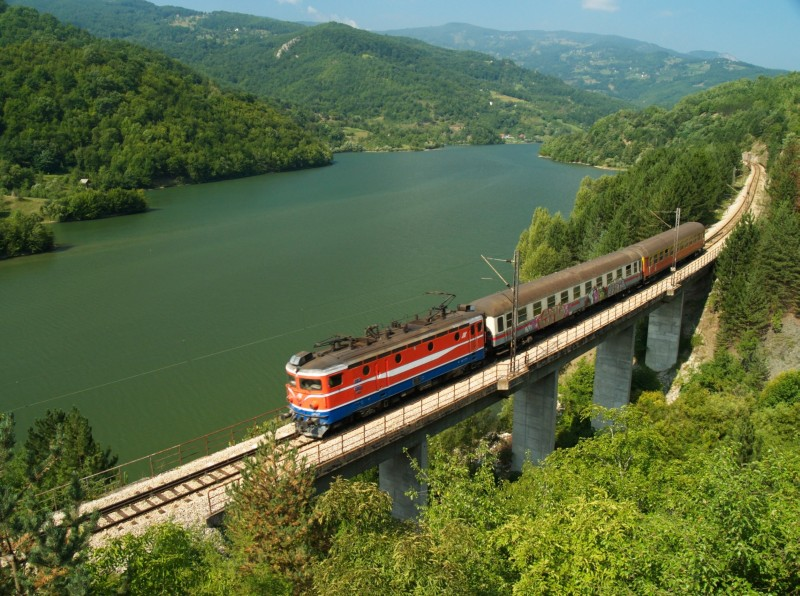
A ŽS 441 from Belgrade to Prijepolje near Priboj, over a reservoir.

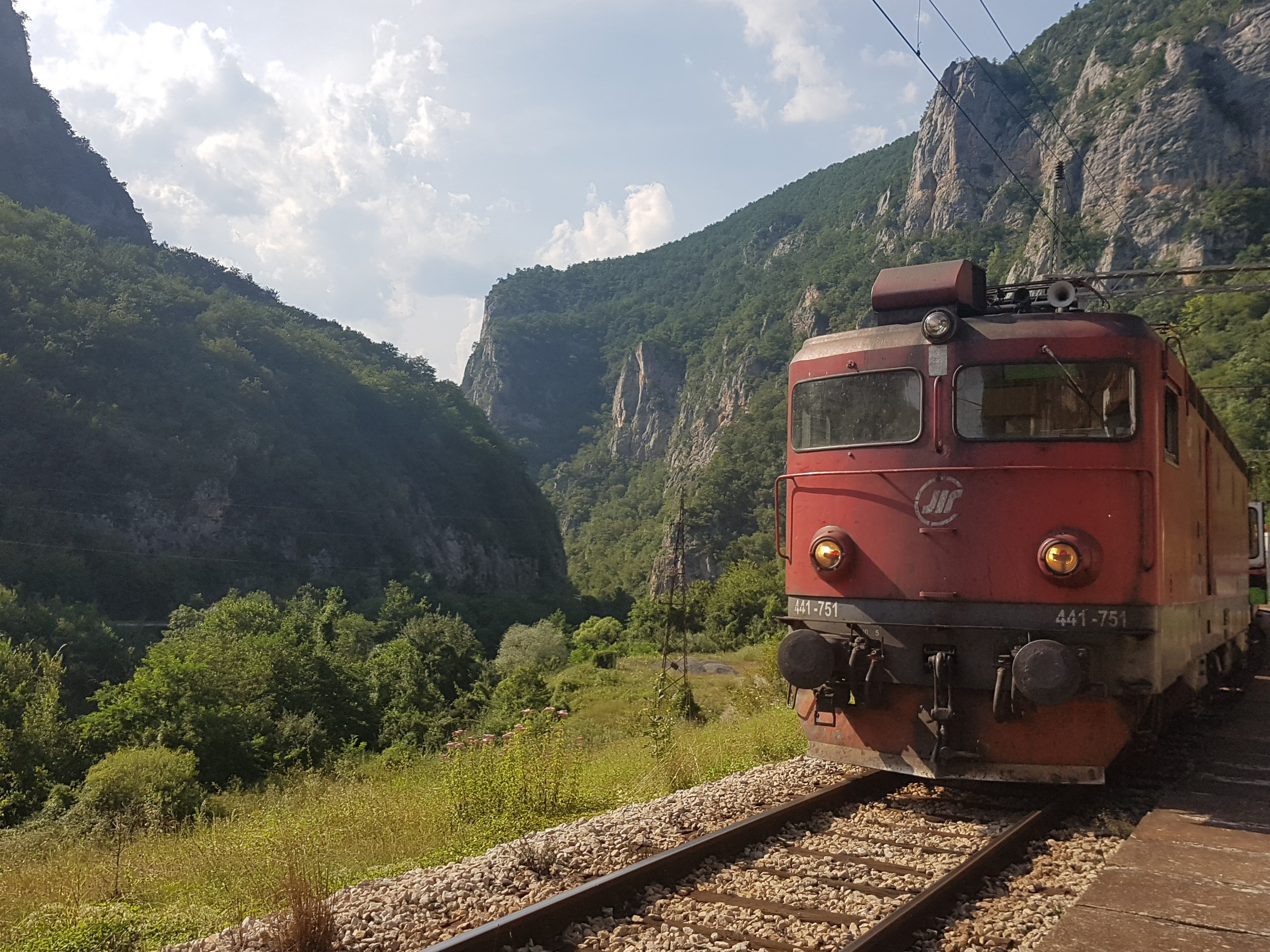
A ŽS 461 at Vrbnica on the border of Serbia and Montenegro, July 2018.

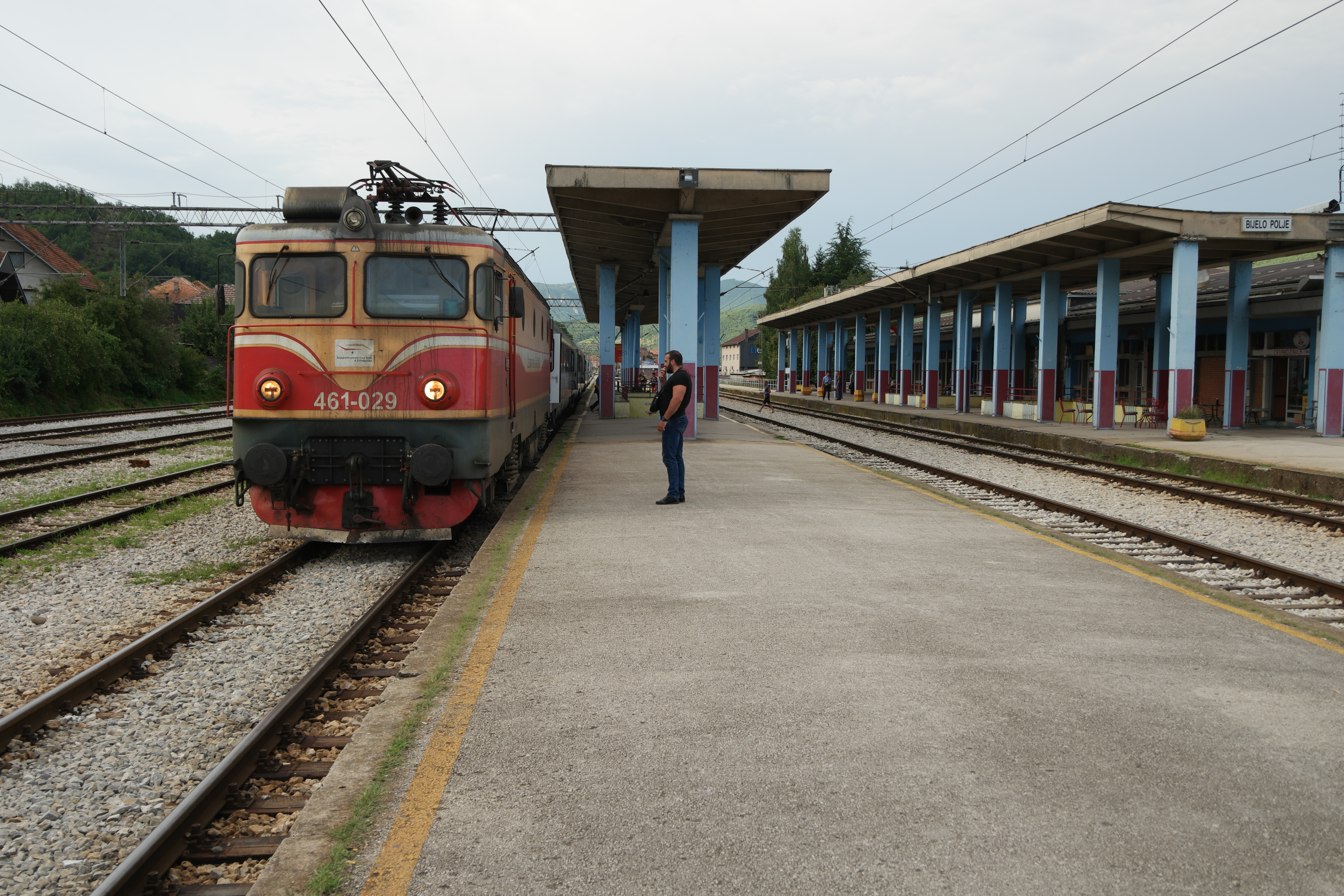
An ŽS 461 at Bijelo Polje railway station railway station, August 2016.

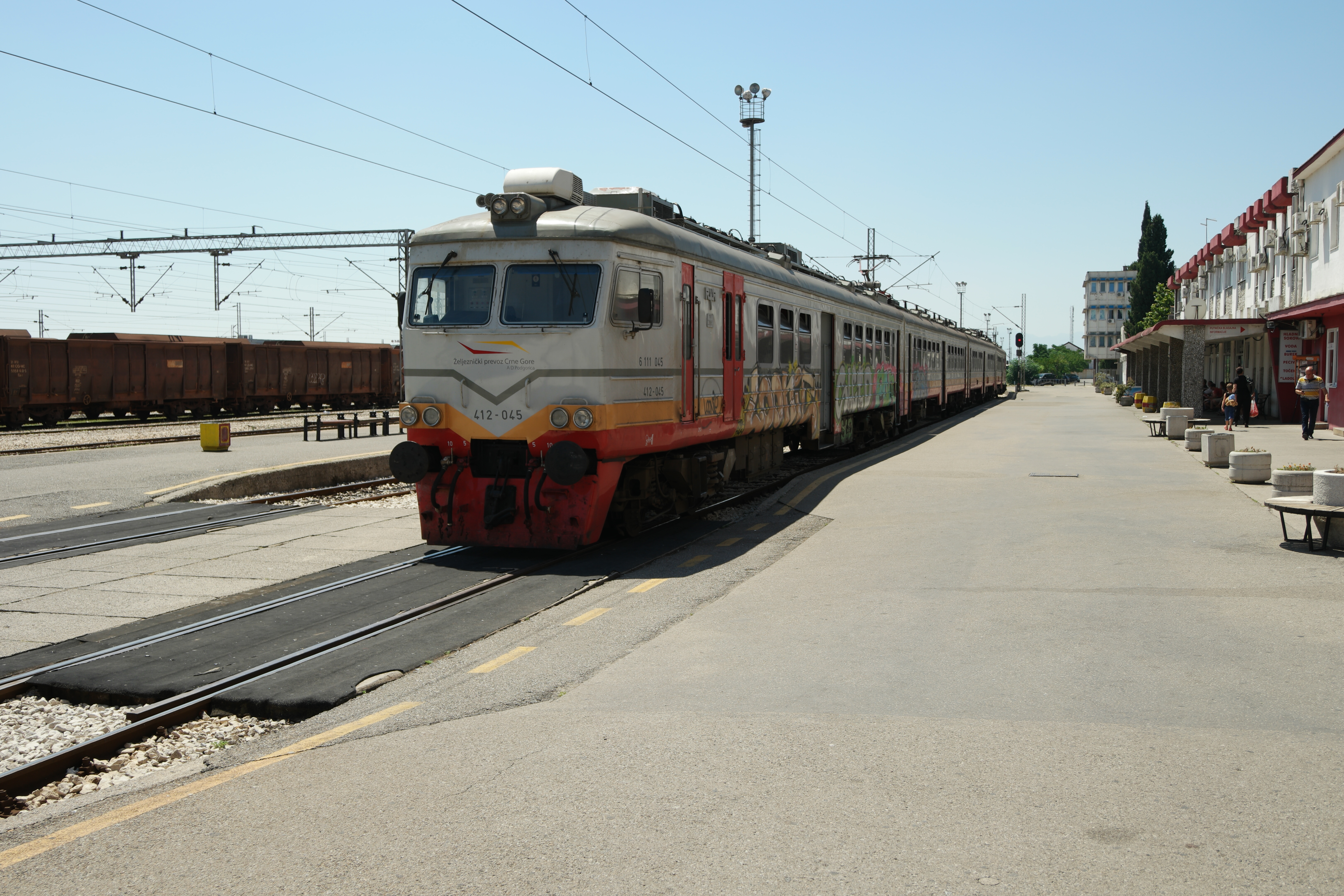
A ŽS 412 at Podgorica railway station, August 2016.

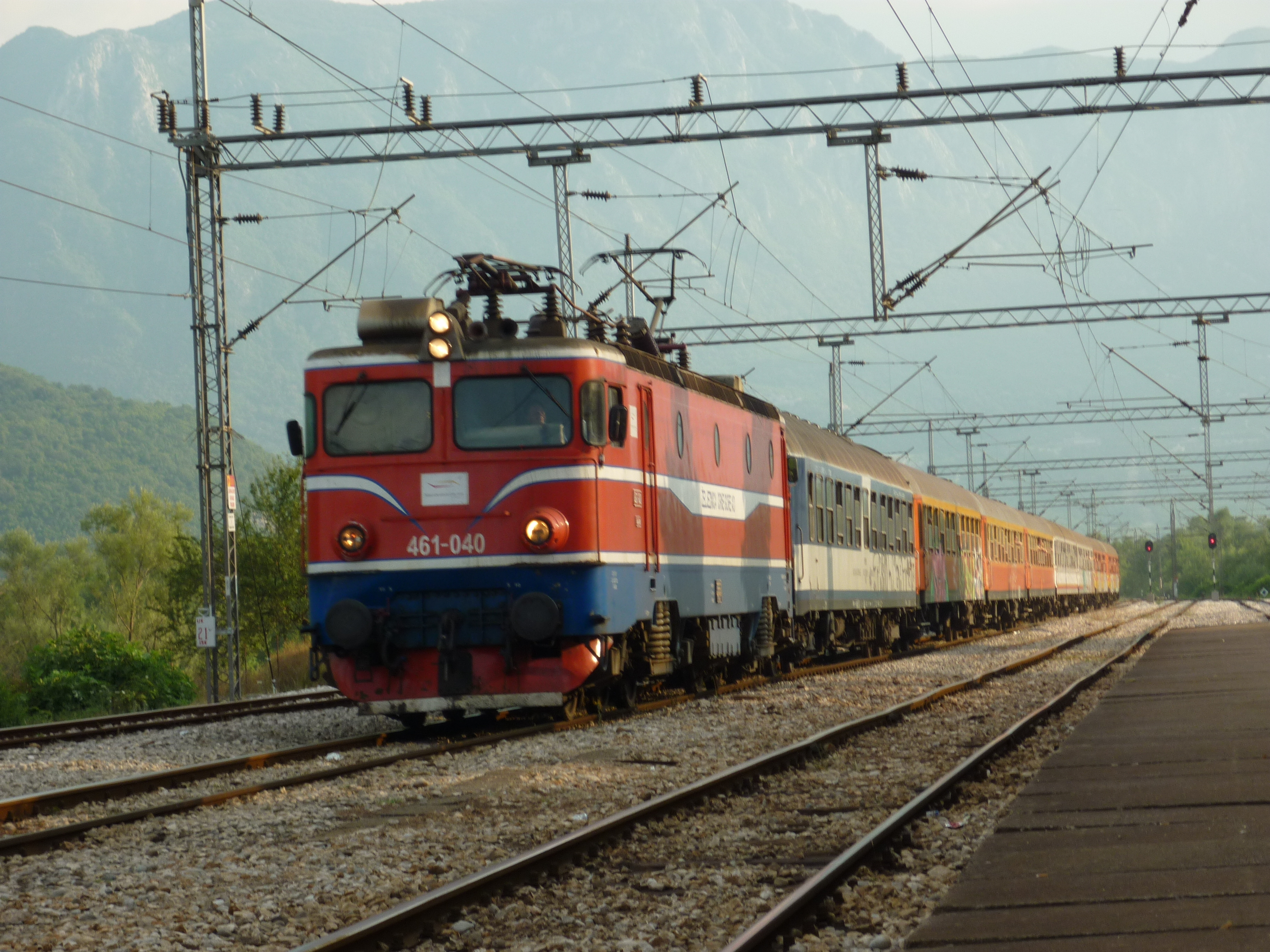
Montenegro railways former ŽS 461 passing through Virpazar, July 2010.

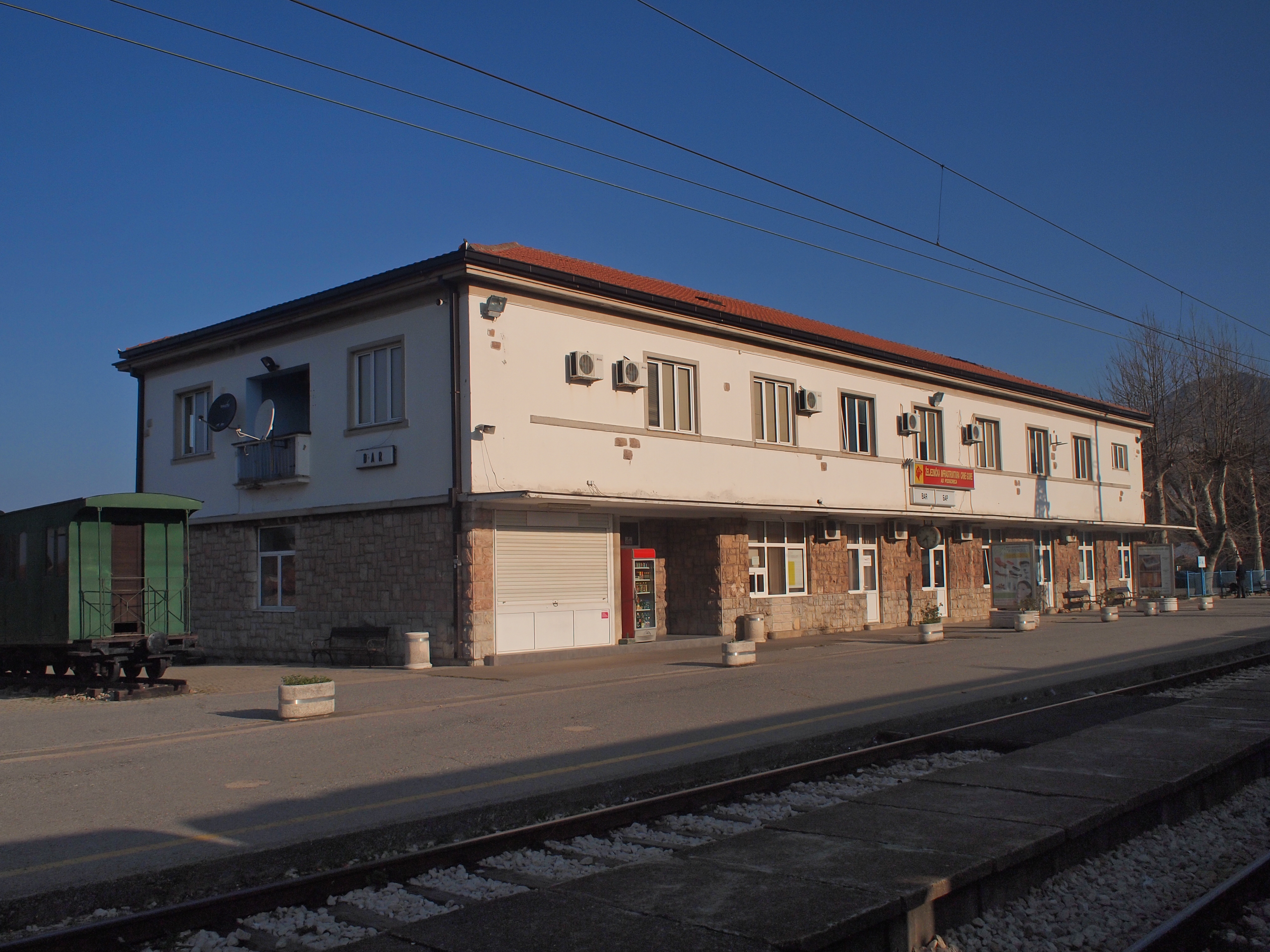
Bar railway station, at the end of the line, March 2014.

== See also ==
- Serbian Railways
- Rail transport in Montenegro
- Tito's Blue Train
- JŽ series 461 commonly operated over the Bar-Belgrade line. Based on a Swedish design.
- JŽ class 412/416 Latvian EMU
- CAF Civity EMU
- JŽ 661 Shunter/Montecargo
- JŽ 644 Shunter/Montecargo
- JŽ 744 (none of them is active) Shunter/Montecargo
- JŽ D66/761s (DB Class V 200 based engines) of Tito's Blue Train.
- JŽ 666s (EMD JT22CW-2s) of Tito's Blue Train
