= Royal train =

Train for the use of the monarch or other members of the royal family

A royal train is a set of railway carriages dedicated for the use of the king or other members of a royal family. Most monarchies with a railway system employ a set of royal carriages. If the monarch is an emperor the proper term is imperial train.

== Australia ==
The various government railway operators of Australia have operated a number of royal trains for members of the royal family on their numerous tours of the country.

== Austria-Hungary ==
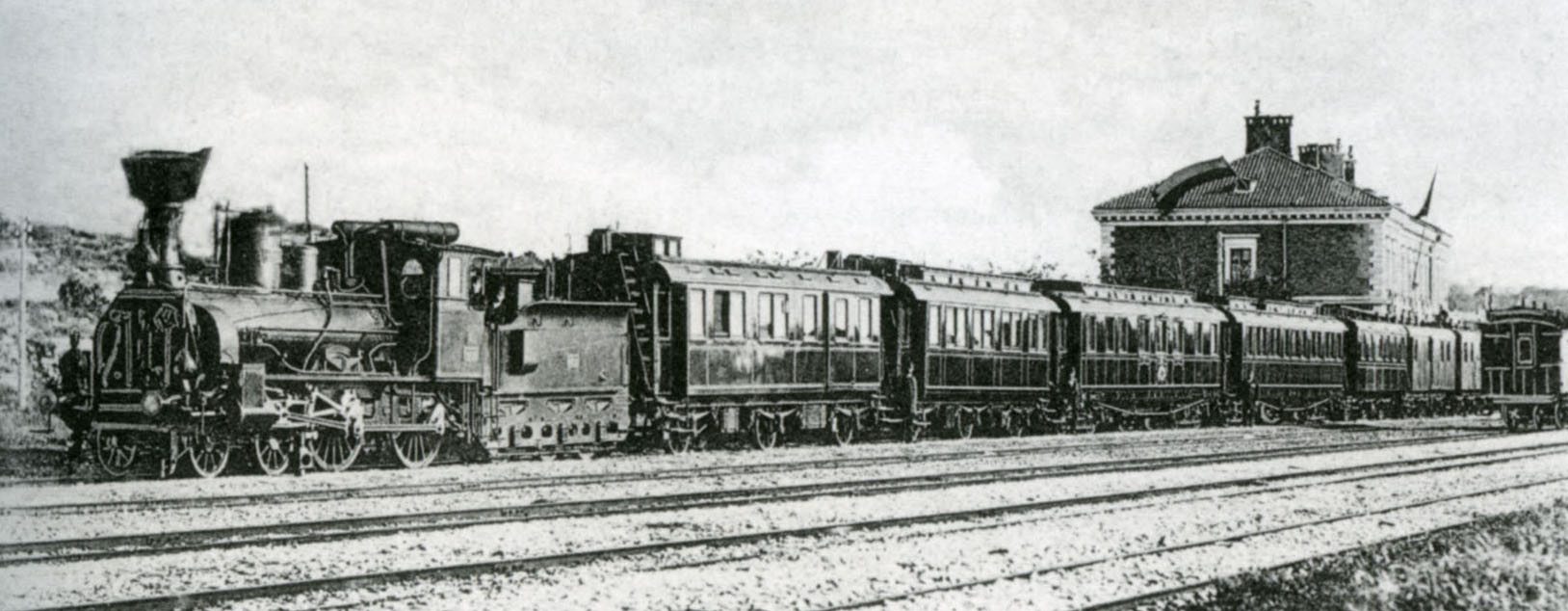
k.u.k. Hofsalonzug at Pula train station, 1899

The imperial and royal court used the k.u.k. Hofsalonzug (Imperial and Royal Court Saloon Train). Various versions existed under the rule of Emperor Franz Joseph I of Austria. Many of the cars were built by Ringhoffer in Bohemia. The cars were operated and maintained by the Imperial Royal Austrian State Railways. Two cars have survived, one is the dining car kept at the Technical Museum in Prague, and the other is the car of Empress Elisabeth of Austria, which is kept at the Technical Museum in Vienna.

== Belgium ==
=== Historic use ===
Some of the historic royal coaches are still preserved, two of which are on display at the Train World museum at Schaerbeek. From the royal coaches that served for King Leopold II and King Albert I are preserved the three most important royal coaches. From the royal coaches that served for King Leopold III and King Baudouin the following are preserved: the drawing room coach (with private rest compartment for the king), the dining coach (with big and private dining compartment and kitchen) and the sleeping coach for the king and queen (with small drawing room, sleeping compartments, bathing compartments with bathtub and compartments for the staff).

=== Modern use (from 2000) ===
For rail transport during visits of heads of state to Belgium, there is a possibility of using a first-class SNCB I11 coach with seats partially removed and a set of armchairs put in the middle of the coach. This arrangement was used for the first time on 30 May 2002 during the state visit of Queen Margrethe II of Denmark, for a trip from Bruges to Brussels-South, and a second time during the state visit of Queen Beatrix of the Netherlands on 22 June 2006 for a trip from Schaerbeek to Liège-Guillemins.

In October 2019, the royal family used a converted 1st class train to visit Luxembourg. They departed from the Brussels-Luxembourg railway station, to not hinder the busy train network around Brussels.

== Canada ==
Royal trains have been employed to transport members of the Canadian royal family on numerous tours prior to the 1960s, after which the Canadian Royal Flight was predominantly used.

- 1860 – Grand Trunk Railway: Prince of Wales (later as King Edward VII)
- 1901 – Canadian Pacific Railway: Duke of York (later as King George V)
- 1906 – Canadian Pacific Railway: Prince Arthur, Duke of Connaught and Strathearn
- 1939 – Canadian Pacific Railway and Canadian National Railway: King George VI and Queen Elizabeth

== Denmark ==
Denmark’s oldest royal coach dates back to 1854 and known as JFJ S (I) (Jysk-Fynske Jernbaner); the S stands for "Salonvogn" which is the Danish classification for all the royal cars up to the modern day. It was gifted to King Frederik VII by Peto, Brassey & Betts at the inauguration of the railway between Flensborg and Tønning (now in German Southern Schleswig), and as a result of the Second Schleswig War it was stranded on the Prussian side of the border but returned to Denmark in 1865 in a barge. It was rebuilt several times first in 1883 where it was fitted with a vacuum brake, gaslighting and Mays heating system. It was rebuilt again in 1898 from a 3-axle to 2-axle car and classified Danish State Railways DSB SB 2, and 1903 reclassified for the last time as DSB S 2 and used as an inspection car until 1934 when it was withdrawn from service. In 1935 its wooden coach body was sold to greengrocer Møller and used as a summer house in Hurup Thy until 1983 when it donated to the DJK (Dansk Jernbane-Klub) Danish railway club. In 1985 it was given to the Aalholm collection at Aalholm Castle, and in 2011 it came to the Danish Railway Museum in Odense where it sits on display as an unrestored coach body to show what several other coaches looked like before restoration.

Since then, the Danish royal family has had a succession of royal coaches. For her 60th birthday in 2000, Queen Margrethe II of Denmark received a new royal coach with a drawing room, sleeping compartments and kitchen. She used this coach for her state visit to Belgium, travelling the night of 27–28 May 2002 from Denmark to Brussels-South and returning from there to Denmark on the evening of 30 May 2002. The coach and the accompanying sleeping car for the staff were hooked to normal trains, except for the part from Aachen to Brussels, where it ran as a special train to allow for the arrival on a reserved platform where the press were waiting.

== Ethiopia ==
Emperor Menelik II was known to use a special first class saloon when travelling on the Franco-Ethiopian Railroad. In 1935, Emperor Haile Selassie of Ethiopia received two carriages from the Société Franco-Belge in Raismes. Another two from the Decauville works were commissioned in 1954. As of its last use in 1973, prior to the Emperor's overthrow in a coup d'etat the following year, the imperial train consisted of two locomotives, a baggage car with a diesel generator, four imperial carriages for the emperor and his family (lounge, sleeping compartments, offices, kitchen and restaurant), two first class salon-sleeper cars for guests of the royal family and government officials, and two second passenger cars. Today the cars are held in storage in the obscure Railway Museum in the yards of Legehar train station, but as of the early 2000s were kept in good condition and are occasionally open for public viewing.

== Germany ==
=== Before 1918 ===
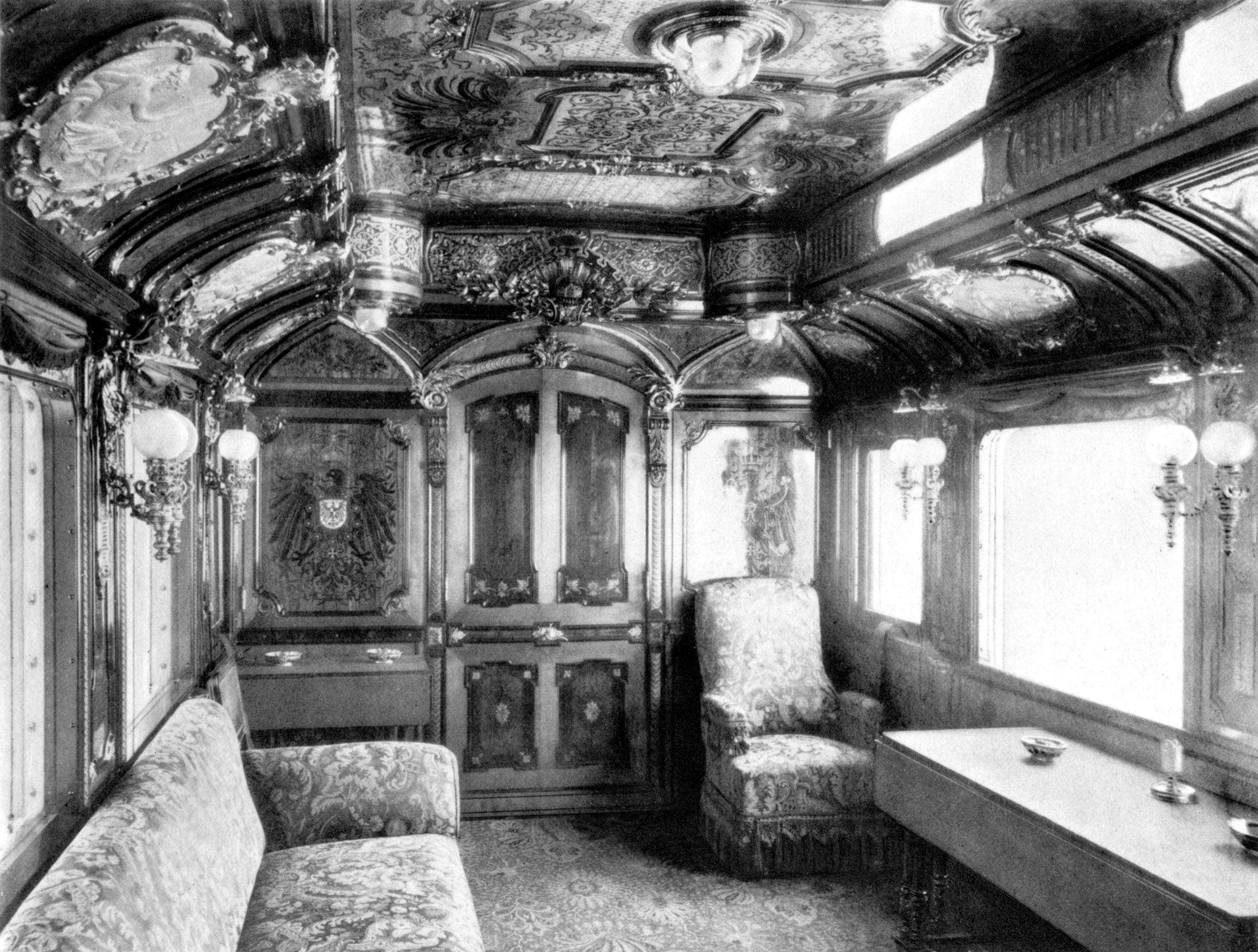
Saloon No. 1 of Kaiser Wilhelm II, 1890s

Germany consisted of more than 30 states – most of them monarchies – when railways came into existence. In the beginning, royalty used first class coaches or first class compartments within public coaches and trains. So Prince Frederick of Prussia (later German Emperor) travelled in a first class compartment in 1851 when the train derailed in the vicinity of Gütersloh.

But soon most of these kings, grand dukes and princes possessed their own private coaches or trains. In other cases the railway companies provided such coaches and rented them to royalty. Complementary to those private coaches and trains were private reception rooms in the station buildings and in some cases even private railway stations for the exclusive use of these privileged few. A well-preserved example is Potsdam Park Sanssouci railway station, a railway station for the use of Emperor Wilhelm II near his summer palace, the New Palace in Potsdam.

==== Prussia ====
King Frederick William IV of Prussia purchased a set of royal coaches in 1857. They ran on two and three axles and were painted in a chestnut brown. None of these have survived. After 30 years of use they became technically outdated, so in 1889 the new emperor, Wilhelm II, who was always very interested in engineering and technological developments started to order new coaches. Until the end of his reign in 1918 there were about 30 coaches. These ran on bogies with either two or three axles and were painted in bright blue and ecru which contrasted significantly with ordinary coaches of the day which usually were painted green, grey or brown; only during World War I the imperial coaches were they painted green. The private car of the emperor is on display in the German Museum of Technology, Berlin, the private car of the empress in the museum of former Linke-Hofmann-Busch GmbH (today: Alstom Transport Deutschland GmbH) who built the coach.

==== Other states ====
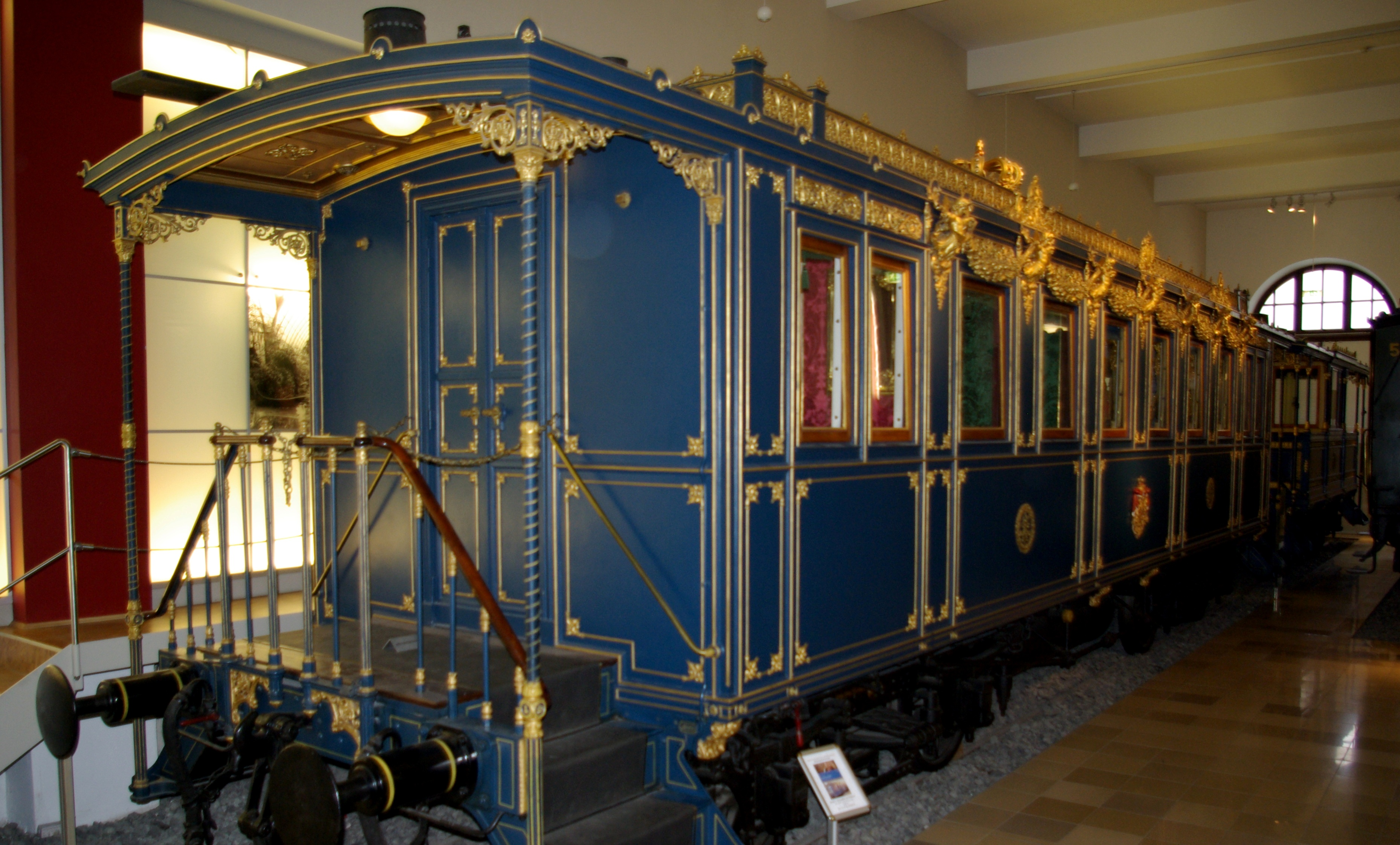
Saloon of King Ludwig II of Bavaria (foreground) and terrace-car (background), second half of the 1860s; preserved in Nuremberg Transport Museum

The kings of Saxony, Wurttemberg and Bavaria possessed their own trains. Two royal coaches of a most splendid design used by King Ludwig II of Bavaria are preserved in the Nuremberg Transport Museum, the king's personal coach as well as a terrace-coach, by half open-air. The Weimar Republic inherited about 100 of these royal cars, a number far larger than necessary for the president and government. So no new cars were built but some of the old ones remained in use. Others were used in luxury trains or in ordinary services, especially dining cars, or as sleepers. Many of them were also converted to departmental vehicles.

== Japan ==
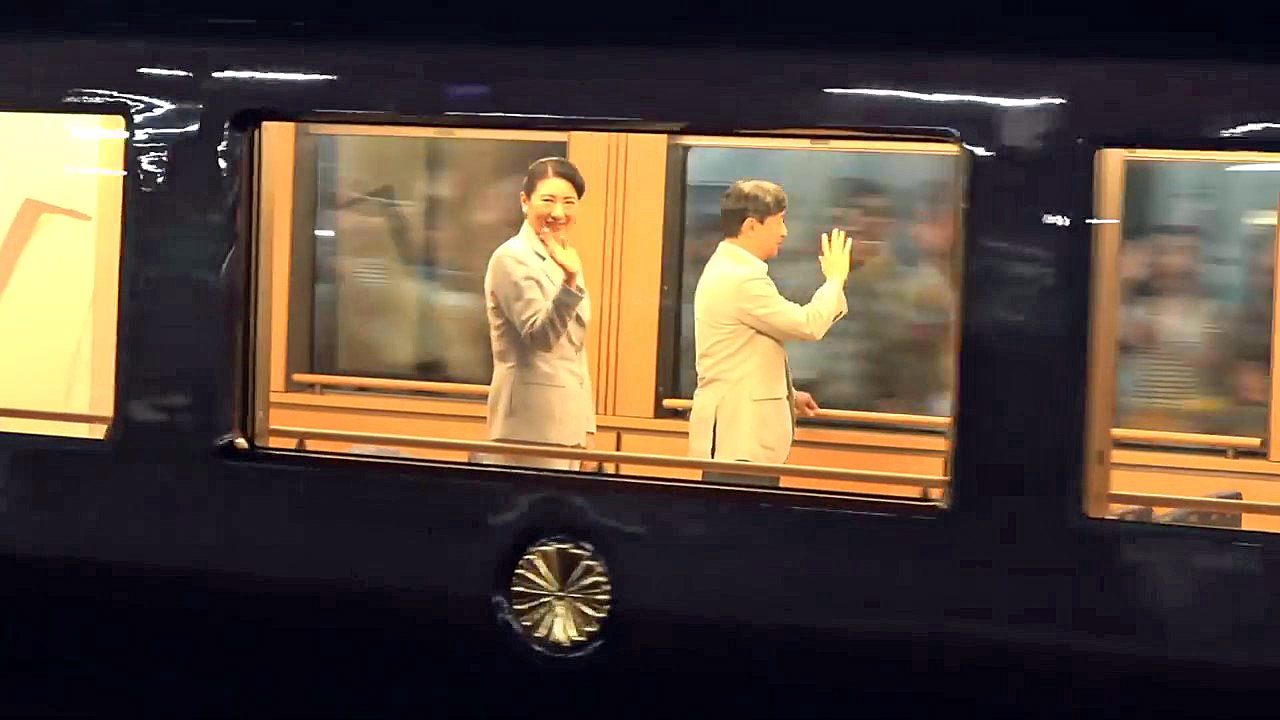
Emperor Naruhito and Empress Masako riding (2019)

In Japan, trains for the emperor, the empress, or the empress dowager are called Omeshi Ressha (お召し列車), literally meaning "trains that they use", albeit using an extremely polite word for "use". Trains for the other members of the imperial family are called Gojōyō Ressha (御乗用列車), meaning "trains to ride" in slightly more common language. However, both Omeshi Ressha and Gojōyō Ressha refer to a non-scheduled service solely operated for the imperial family. Dedicated imperial carriages were owned by Japanese National Railways (JNR), and these came under the control of the East Japan Railway Company (JR East) following privatization. The dedicated locomotive-hauled set was retired in the 2000s and replaced by the specially built E655 series EMU, which can also be used as a VIP charter trainset.

When the emperor must travel on the Shinkansen or private railways, other trainsets may be used for Omeshi Ressha service, such as the Kintetsu 50000 series EMU for visits to Ise Grand Shrine. These trainsets are otherwise operated regularly for passenger service, but as is the case with the Kintetsu 50000 or the N700 Series Shinkansen, may have carriages retrofitted with bulletproof windows to accommodate the emperor.

Additionally, when travelling to Ise, an additional carriage is reserved solely for the transport of the Three Sacred Treasures as they must accompany the emperor.

Under Emperor Akihito, imperial trains were used less and less: the emperor generally travelled by air, or regular scheduled trains with a reserved carriage. In this case, bulletproof carriages were used where available. Imperial trains were still operated occasionally, but they mainly functioned as a cordial reception area for state guests, rather than transportation of the imperial family.

== Morocco ==
The Moroccan royal train was composed of SPV-2000 railcars produced by Budd Company in the US and delivered in the early 1980s. The royal train consists of two self-propelled cars. After King Hassan II died, his successor, King Mohammed VI, stopped using the royal train.

== The Netherlands ==
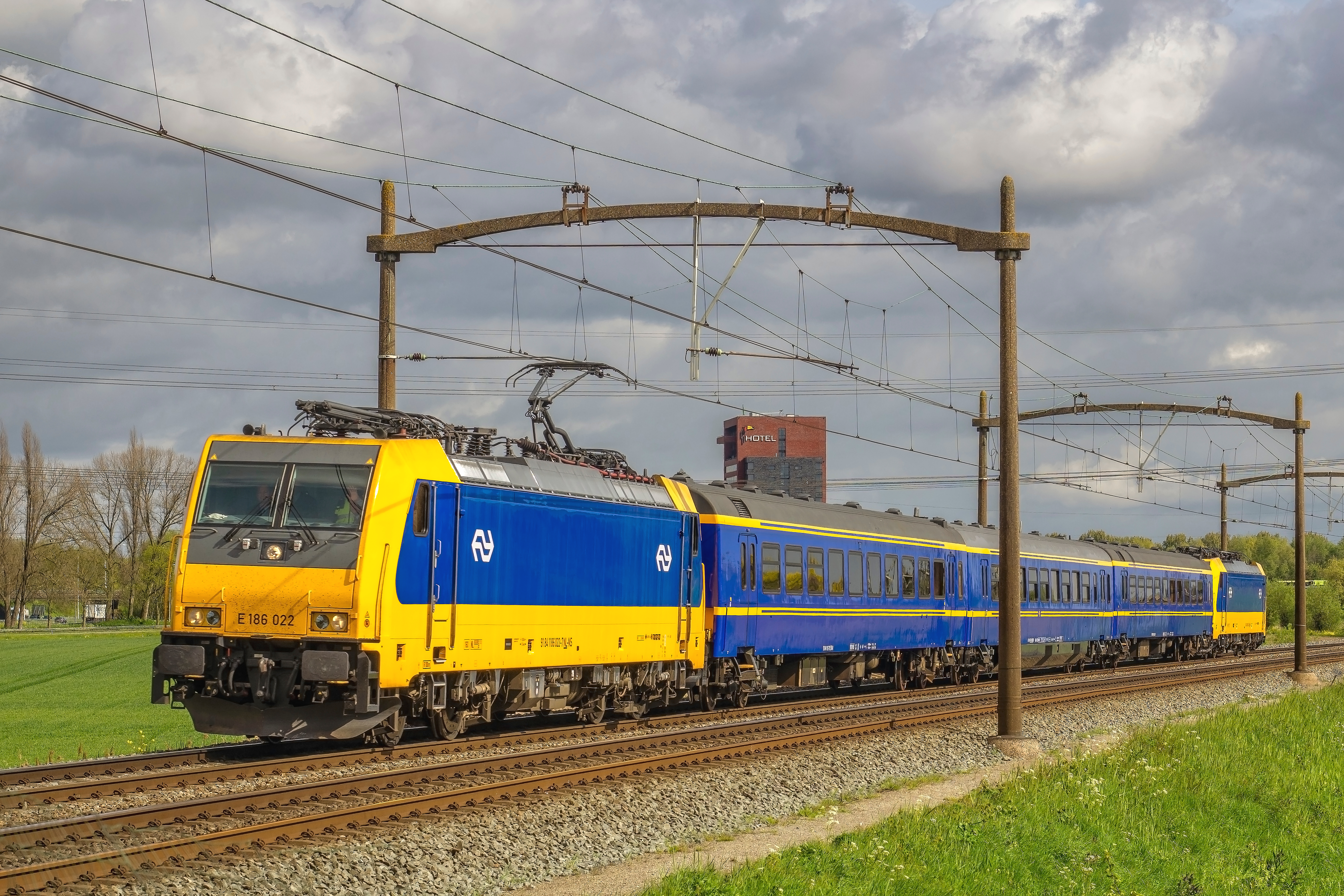
Dutch royal train south of Dordrecht in 2017

The Dutch State Railways (NS) uses a single royal carriage to transport the king and his family. It was ordered by the Dutch royal family in 1991, and construction was finished in 1993. It replaced a previous two-carriage royal train built in 1930, which is currently on display in the Dutch Railway Museum. In 2012 two more carriages were added to the royal train. These former first class passenger carriages were slightly modified and painted blue for use in the royal train. However, they are not available for international use, unlike the royal carriage itself, which is an International Coach Regulations carriage allowed in 16 different countries. When the king travels by train, a single (diesel) locomotive travels ahead to explore the tracks. The train itself is composed of two ordinary locomotives of the Dutch State Railways (head and tail of the train), the royal carriage itself, and, since 2012, the two slightly modified first class passenger carriages for staff, press and other guests. Before 2012, instead of the two extra carriages, two ordinary first class passenger carriages were added. Usually those carriages were the most luxurious type NS had available.

== New Zealand ==
The Royal Trains were special train carriages used by the New Zealand Railways during royal visits to New Zealand between 1901 and 1954.

== Norway ==
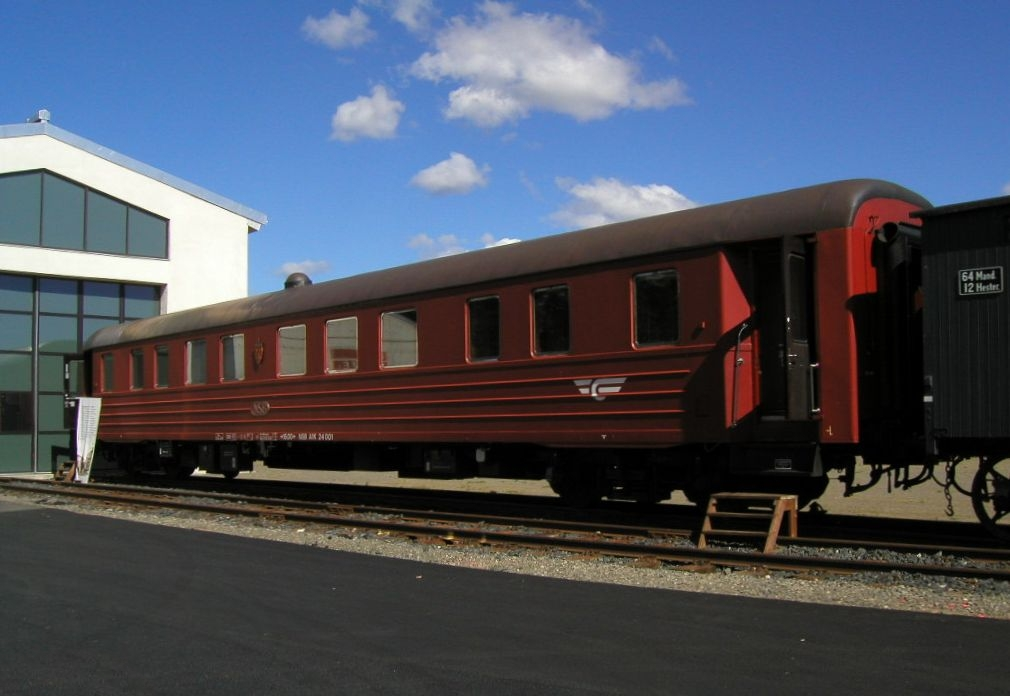
The former royal carriage A1 24001 outside the Norwegian Railway Museum

The Norwegian Royal Train is a train carriage used by the Norwegian royal family and maintained by the Norwegian Railway Museum. The current carriage was introduced in 1994 in connection with the Lillehammer Olympics and replaced a carriage from 1962. The current carriage contains a main sleeping compartment with dressing room and adjoining bathroom, two guest compartments, guest bathroom, kitchen, guard compartments and a combined dining and conference room.

The carriage is pulled by ordinary railway locomotives and most often ordinary passenger carriages for press and other guests are added.

== Romania ==
The Romanian Royal Train was ordered by King Ferdinand I of Romania in 1926 to Ernesto Breda/Construzioni Meccaniche plants in Milan. It was delivered in 1928, one year after King Ferdinand's death. It was subsequently used by Queen Marie of Romania, King Michael I of Romania, Queen-Mother Elena of Romania and King Carol II of Romania.

The train is composed of one steam-engine locomotive (under restoration, for the moment) and five railway cars: the Dining Car, the King's Car, the Queen's Car, the Guests Car and the Royal House Personnel's Car.

On 3 January 1948 King Michael I and his mother, Queen Elena, were forced into exile by the newly installed Communist authorities. After a thorough luggage search for valuables, the King left Romania (from Sinaia) for Austria, in the Royal Train, with tightly closed windows and under strict supervision. The royal family was in exile until 1997, when the post-1989 government of Victor Ciorbea revoked their loss of citizenship.

During the communist era, the train was used occasionally by the communist rulers of Romania, especially by Gheorghe Gheorghiu-Dej.

In recent years, the Royal Train was gradually renovated by an NGO (the old steam locomotive is still under renovation and cannot be used).

On 15 October 2012, ownership of the train line reverted from the state to the ownership of King Michael I. Starting in 2012, the Royal Train is annually used by the Romanian royal family (Crown Princess Margareta, the eldest daughter and heir of King Michael) for public events, mainly trips with political and symbolic significance as well as travelling between the Balkan countries. For example, since 2013, the train has made regular trips. The first one was on 1 December (celebration of National Union of Romania) one the route Sinaia, Bușteni, Predeal, Brașov, Codlea, Făgăraș, Avrig and Sibiu and it was met with huge public appreciation and participation at stops; another trip was in remembrance of the royal family, Parliament and Government retreat from Bucharest to Iași in World War I, during the German occupation of Bucharest. The trips are met with great political and public enthusiasm as well as anticipation.

King Michael I of Romania was given a state funeral on 16 December 2017. At the conclusion of the ceremonies in Bucharest, the coffin was taken from Băneasa Railway Station to Curtea de Argeș Railway Station on board the Royal Train for burial in Curtea de Argeș.

== Russian Empire ==
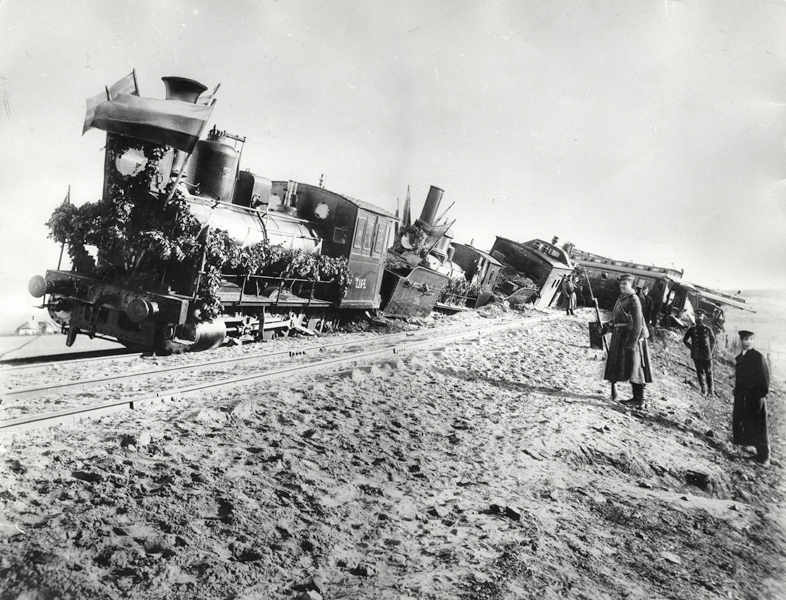
Alexander III's train derailed at Borki, 1888

The late Romanov Tsars traveled by rail extensively over the expanse of their empire.

The catastrophic derailment of the Russian Royal Train on 17 October 1888 killed 21 people, however Alexander III, along with his wife and children, survived. After this accident, a so-called Temporary Imperial Train was composed of several surviving cars of the wrecked train, with the addition of several converted passenger cars of the Nikolayevskaya Railway. The emperor also had at his disposal a standard gauge Imperial Train, used for traveling to Europe; this train set was purchased by the Russian Railway Ministry from Chemins de fer de Paris à Lyon et à la Méditerranée in the 1870s, and was deemed to be technologically obsolescent.

Accordingly, new standard-gauge and broad-gauge trains for the use of the Imperial Court were constructed. The new broad-gauge Imperial Train for domestic travel became ready in time for the coronation of Nicholas II in 1896. Initially the train consisted of 7 cars, purpose-built at the Aleksandrovsky Railway Factory in St Petersburg. Later, the size of the train was increased to 10 cars. When the Royal family moved from one palace to another, as much as twenty cars were required just for their luggage. One of the best known aspects of the refurbished train was the Tsar's personal bathroom which boasted a bathtub that would not spill water no matter which direction the train was turning. The old "temporary" train in the meantime was transferred for use of Empress Dowager Maria Feodorovna.

The Russian Empire itself came to an end with Nicholas II's abdication in 1917 while aboard his Imperial Train at Dno. The train itself was later moved to Alexandria Park in the 1930s and used as a museum exhibition. It was later captured by the Nazis, who stripped it of much of its piping, plumbing and wiring and looted any items of value during the Second World War. In 1954, the Politburo ordered all remnants of the Imperial Train to be dismantled.

== South Africa ==
From 5 February to 10 April 1934, Prince George, Duke of Kent, toured South Africa in a special train known as The White Train.

The three-month-long British royal family tour of South Africa in 1947 saw the ordering of eight ivory-painted air-conditioned saloons from Britain, three of which were built to Blue Train sleeping car standards, while the remaining five were special saloons for use by the royal family and Field Marshal Jan Smuts, the South African prime minister.

After the tour the Blue Train type saloons were painted in matching livery to serve on the Blue Train, while the remaining special saloons became part of the White Train used exclusively by the governor-general and later the president of South Africa. Part of the Royal Train is preserved in the Outeniqua Transport Museum, George, South Africa, with a SAR Class "GL" 2351 "Princess Alice" Garrett steam locomotive that actually was used to haul the White Train in 1947.

== Sweden ==
Sweden's first royal train was put into service in 1874 for the use of King Oscar II. It consisted of five cars: an audience (meeting) car, a dining car, a saloon car, a sleeping car for the King and another sleeping car for Queen consort Sophia. In 1891 the cars were converted to bogie-cars and put together two and two: The King's sleeping car was joined with the saloon car; the Queen's sleeping car was joined with the dining car. The audience car was not converted. The different cars were rebuilt, refurbished and replaced continuously over the years, and some of them are now on display at the Swedish Railway Museum in Gävle. The last royal train car to be built was in 1931 for King Gustav V. It was used on the King's many trips from Sweden to Nice in southern France as a through coach connected to regular trains. The King's royal car remained in use for several of his successors and was also used by the present King Carl XVI Gustaf and his family on their trips to the mountains in northern Sweden, as a through coach connected to regular trains. In the year 2001 the last royal car was taken out of regular service and is now on display at the Swedish Railway Museum, however it has been put back into service for special occasions since; the museum is connected by rail to the regular network and some of the cars on display can rather easily be brought back to service.

== United Kingdom ==
Queen Victoria was the first British monarch to travel by train, on 13 June 1842, when she travelled on the Great Western Railway (GWR), which ran the line between London Paddington and Windsor (for Windsor Castle). She famously quoted, when the train was recording 30 mph (48 km/h), "This is too fast for a person to travel". Soon, other major British railway companies had their own carriage(s) dedicated for use by the royal family or other dignitaries.

In 1948, upon the formation of British Railways, the individual regions continued to maintain their own royal train carriages. A single "Royal Train" was only formed in 1977 as a response to the demands of the Silver Jubilee of Elizabeth II. This train has been maintained since the privatisation of British Rail by DB Cargo UK at Wolverton Works, although the royal family has travelled on ordinary service trains more frequently in recent years to minimise costs. In 2025, it was announced that the Royal Train would be decommissioned before its maintenance contract ends in early 2027. The Keeper of the Privy Purse described the move as part of a broader effort toward "fiscal discipline" and modernising royal transport, with King Charles III supporting the decision.

== Non-royal official trains ==
Rail transport, in the form of special presidential trains, have been widely used by the leaders of countries that are/were not monarchies, while private rail cars, whether attached to regular passenger trains or not, were once used by the very rich in many countries. Presidents of the United States often traveled in presidential railcars and Soviet leaders had special trains. (One of Leonid Brezhnev's rail cars is preserved at the Pokrovsk Station in Engels City and Volodymyr Shcherbytsky's car in Kyiv.) Leaders of North Korea, starting from Kim Il-Sung, had their own fleet of private trains. In Yugoslavia, Josip Broz Tito had the Blue Train. In the Philippines, Ferdinand Marcos had the Presidential Carriage (PC) 286. This unit was decommissioned in 1986, but in 2020 this carriage was planned for refurbishment.

== See also ==
- Air transports of heads of state and government
- Official state car
- North Korean leaders' trains
- Royal waiting room
- Royal yacht

== Literature ==
- Malevinsky, P (П.Малевинский) (1900), Императорский ширококолейный поезд для путешествий по России постройки 1896 - 1897 гг. Составлено под руководством Временного Строительного Комитета по постройке Императорских поездов инженером П. Малевинским (Imperial broad-gauge train for travel in Russia, constructed in 1896-1897. Compiled by Engineer P. Malevinsky under the guidance of the Temporary Construction Committee for the Construction of Imperial Trains) (PDF) (in Russian), МПС России (Russia's Ministry of the Means of Transportation) (Individual illustrations from this book can also be found at this page: Императорский ширококолейный поезд для путешествий по России)
