= Presidential train =

A presidential train is an official train used by a country's president. They include:

- Taeyangho armoured train (North Korea)
- Tito's Blue Train (Yugoslavia)
- Presidential Railcars (The United States of America)

== See also ==
- Luxury train
- Royal train
