= Krauss-Maffei ML 2200 C'C' =

German diesel-hydraulic locomotives

Krauss-Maffei ML 2200 C'C' JŽ D 66 / JŽ 761 Krauss-Maffei ML 3000 C'C' DB V 300 001 / DB 230 001
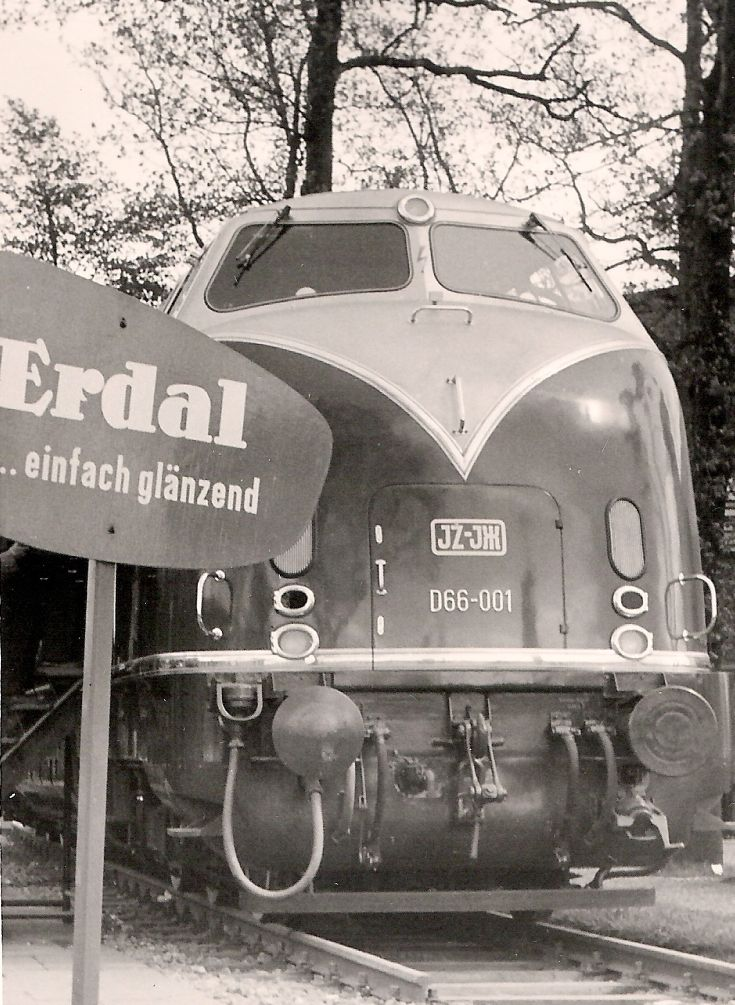
- ML-2200 Jugoslav railways JZ D-66 (April 1957)
Type and origin
- Power type: Diesel
- Builder: Krauss-Maffei
- Serial number: ML 2200 C'C' (Jugoslavia): JŽ D 66-001 "Dinara"; JŽ D 66-002 "Kozara"; JŽ D 66-003 "Sutjeska" later: JŽ 761 001-003; ML 3000 C'C' (Hungary): MÁV M 61 2001 (1960); Deutsche Bundesbahn: V 300 001 (1963-1968), 230 001 (after 1968)
- Build date: 1957
- Total produced: 4
- Rebuild date: 1958 (Conversion of ML 2200 C'C' to ML 3000 C'C')
- Number rebuilt: 3
Specifications
- Configuration
  - UIC: C′C′
- Gauge: 1,435 mm (4 ft 8 1/2 in) standard gauge
- Length: 20.270 m (66 ft 6 in)
- Loco weight: 96 t (94 long tons; 106 short tons) (ML 2200 C'C'); 104 t (102 long tons; 115 short tons) (ML 3000 C'C')
- Fuel type: diesel fuel
- Prime mover: Maybach (2 of)
- Engine type: V12 diesel
- Cylinders: 12
- Transmission: Mekydro hydraulic
- Loco brake: Air
- Train brakes: Air
Performance figures
- Maximum speed: ML 2200 C'C' : 120 km/h (75 mph); ML 3000 C'C' : 140 km/h (87 mph)
- Power output: ML 2200 C'C' : 2 × 1,200 hp (890 kW); ML 3000 C'C' : 2 × 1,500 hp (1,100 kW)
- Tractive effort: 336 kN
Career
- Retired: JZ 1991, DB 1975
- Scrapped: DB: 1980

The diesel-hydraulic locomotive ML 2200 C'C' was a 6 axle variant of the DB Class V 200 series of locomotives, which were built for Yugoslav State Railways (JDŽ) by manufacturer Krauss-Maffei.

The JDŽ bought three units, which it initially named D 66, later these were named JŽ series 761

A fourth engine was rebuilt as ML 3000 C'C', which was eventually purchased by the Deutsche Bundesbahn and numbered V 300 001 (after 1968 as 230 001).

== Background, design and production ==
In 1955, the German Federal Railways (Deutsche Bundesbahn), together with the company Krauss-Maffei, took the DB Class V 200 locomotive V 200 005 on a demonstration journey to Turkey, Greece, and Yugoslavia.

The result of this was that the interest of the JDŽ in the V 200 was awakened, and in 1956 ordered three locomotives; however, on Yugoslav railways the axle load limit was 16 t; so Krauss-Maffei designed the ML 2200 C'C', a six axle version of the V 200 with correspondingly lower axle loads. (Note: Two bogies each of three axles, making the axle load ~ 2/3 of the V 200) This was the version that the JDŽ procured. Additionally, a more efficient cooling system than in the V 200 was installed, as Yugoslavia has a warmer climate than Germany.

The main frame was welded, the basic construction and design was like that of the DB Class V 200: In the engine room the 2 Maybach MD650 engines of 1,100 hp each were located, one over each bogie, each bogie being driven by a separate hydraulic transmission, Maybach Mekydro K104. The cooling system was located between the diesel engines. Compared to a V 200 the length increased by 1.77 m, from 18.5 m to 20.27 m. The weight was 96 tonnes, giving an axle load of 16 tonnes. Maximum speed was lower than the V 200 at 120 km/h.

The factory numbers of the three locomotives were 18368 to 18370. All the machines were painted blue and white. JZ D 66-001 was exhibited at the Hanover Fair in the spring of 1957 and transferred to Yugoslavia in May, being delivered to Belgrade on 27 May 1957, on the president's 65th birthday.

== Operations ==
After a short introductory period, the locomotives were chartered for the "Blue Train" the government chartered train the president Josip Broz Tito used. When not used on presidential train duties, the locomotives also hauled express trains. The locomotives were named: D66-001 was "Dinara", D66-002 "Kozara", and D66-003 "Sutjeska". The names were written in silver letters on the side walls of engines. In the 1978, the presidential locomotives were replaced by four EMD JT22CW-2.

After Tito's death in 1980, the locomotives were moved from Belgrade to the depot at Subotica where they worked as ordinary locomotives, finally being stopped in 1991.

In 1998, the locomotives were in a dilapidated condition, and by 2007 were located in Topčider (a suburb of Belgrade), where they are part of a railway museum there: the former Yugoslavian government of Yugoslavia built a special building in Topčider for them.

== The fourth ML 2200 C'C' ==
Further orders did not come from Yugoslavia as it lacked the financial means to do so. Nevertheless, Krauss-Maffei built of its own accord a ML 2200 C'C' in 1957, ready for purchase, painted in blue and cream. On the front was the Krauss-Maffei logo and on the side walls "KRAUSS-MAFFEI A.G". Its serial number was 18 416. This machine was from September to October 1957 tested on the Semmering Railway in Austria.

Thus, for operations on the Bundesbahn performance measurements were available; the locomotive worked scheduled passenger trains and freight trains of up to 612 tonnes weight. The findings from these trips led to the development of the Krauss-Maffei ML 4000 C'C'.

=== ML 3000 C'C' ===
In tests on the Black Forest Railway in October 1957, it was found that the maximum speed of the locomotives was not sufficient; this prompted Krauss-Maffei to set about rebuilding the locomotive. The rebuild took place from October 1957 to May 1958, after which the locomotive received the designation ML 3000 C'C'. Specifically more powerful engines were installed of the type MD 12 V 538 TB 10 Maybach MD655 producing 1,500 hp each. Because of the increased power output, a new transmission was also required, this being the Maybach Mekydro K184U transmission.

It was painted in cream and red with a white band on the vehicle frame. After completion in July 1958, it was used on the Black Forest Railway and later on the Mittenwaldbahn (Mittenwald railway), and on the Allgäubahn (the Munich to Allgäu and Lindau lines), as well as the Austrian Semmeringbahn.

In September 1960, the locomotive was trialled by Hungarian Railways, during which it was numbered M 61 2001.

=== DB Class V 300 001 ===
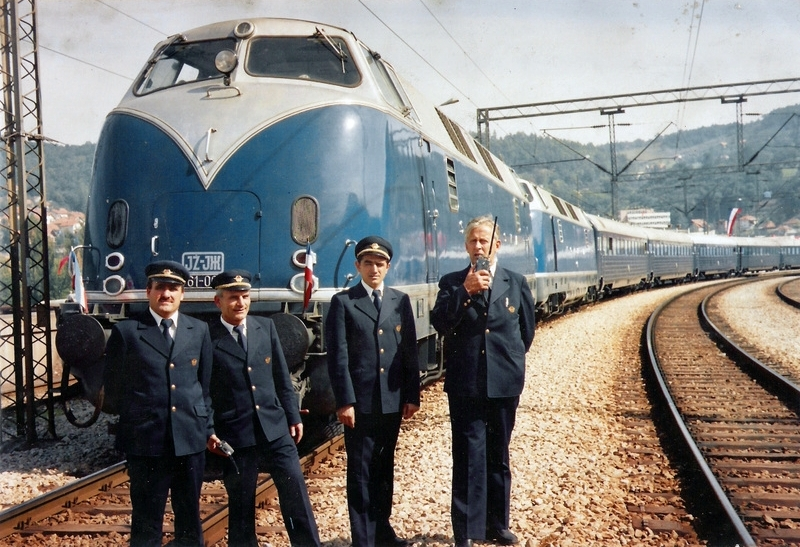
JŽ D66/761 locomotives of Tito's Blue Train at the opening of the Belgrade-Bar railway in 1976.

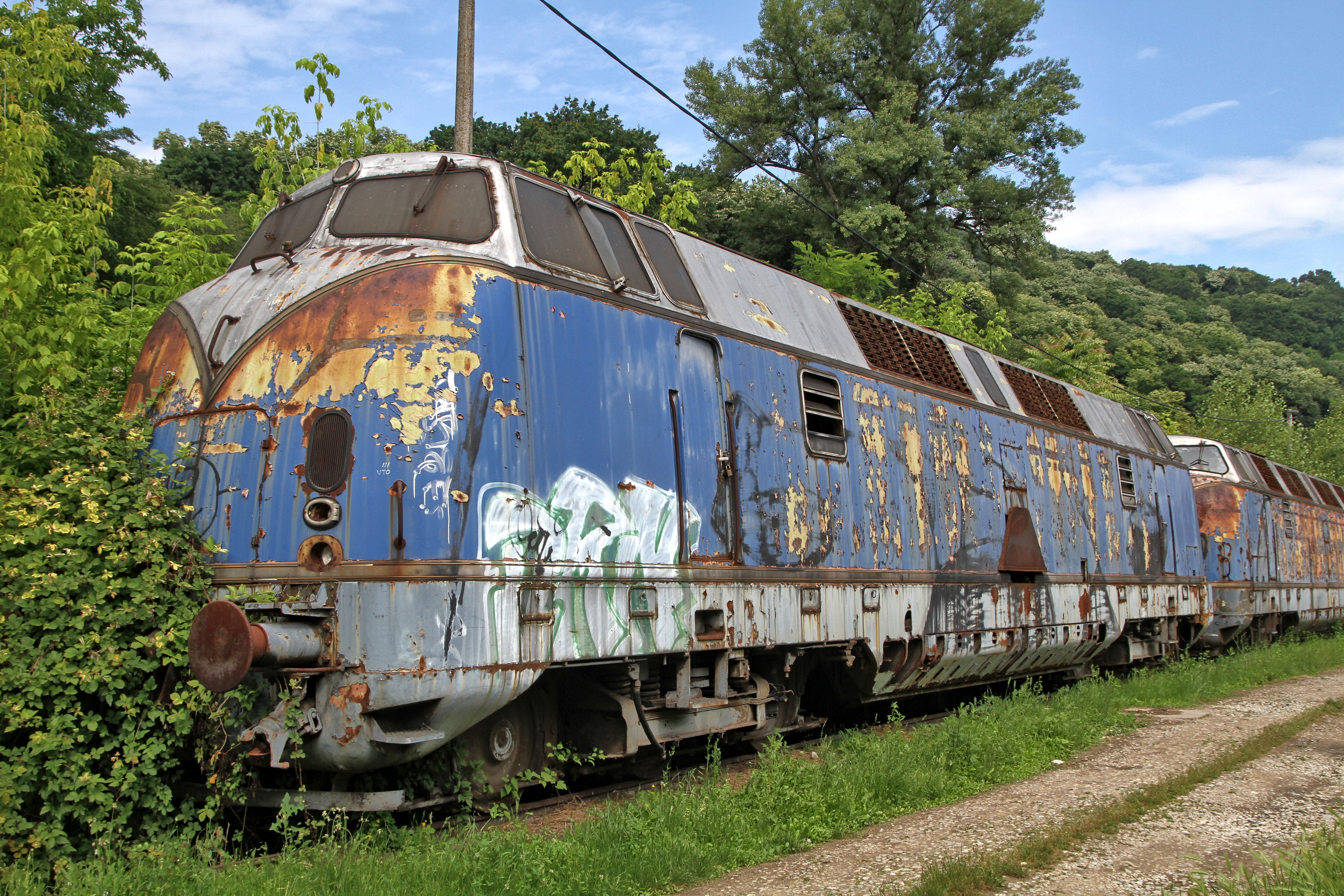
JŽ D66/761 as it looks stored at Topčider. (2016)

In January 1963, the fourth engine was leased by the Deutsche Bundesbahn, who numbered it V 300 001, but was initially otherwise unchanged. The DB purchased the locomotive on 17 April 1964. At this point, it received the same red-grey livery colour the V 200s carried, as well as the characteristic 'V' on the nose.

It was initially used in express and freight service, and based at the engine shed at Hamm. From 1968 onwards, with the DB's change in numbering locomotives, the unit was reclassified as 230 001.

In August 1970, it was based at the engine shed at Hamburg-Altona, working on daily express trains on the Marschbahn in Westerland in Schleswig-Holstein.

Withdrawal came in August 1975, and in 1977 it was sold to the Italian locomotive dealer Bulfone in Udine. Although it performed capably, the unit's length restricted it from some branch lines, thus after about a year it was brought back to Germany in late 1978 as the Italian sale was cancelled.

The locomotive was scrapped in 1980, at the Layritz company in Penzberg.

== See also ==
- JŽ class 11 steam locomotives that were replaced by the JŽ 761.
- JŽ 666 (EMD JT22CW-2) locomotives that replaced the JŽ 761.
- Rail transport in Montenegro
- Serbian Railways
- Tito's Blue Train
