= Taeyangho armoured train =

State train of North Korea

Taeyangho
- A train of Kim Jong Un hauled by two Russian TEP70 locomotives in Vladivostok, Russia (April 2019)
- Type: Armoured train
- Place of origin: North Korea

Service history
- In service: c. 1950 – present
- Used by: Democratic People's Republic of Korea

Production history
- Designer: Korean State Railway
- Manufacturer: Korean State Railway
- No. built: 6

Specifications
- Length: 310 m (1,017.06 ft) (10 car); 443 m (1,453.41 ft) (15 car); 576 m (1,889.76 ft) (20 car)
- Diameter: 762 mm gauge 1,435 mm gauge 1,520 mm gauge
- Crew: 100+
- Passengers: 100+
- Armor: Classified bulletproof windows Classified explosion-proof flooring
- Secondary armament: 2x machine gun
- Engine: 2x reinforced armoured China Railways DF8 locomotive
- Maximum speed: 60 km/h (37 mph)

Since the establishment of North Korea, all three of its leaders—Kim Il Sung, Kim Jong Il and Kim Jong Un—have been known to use high-security private trains as their preferred method of domestic and international travel. The train is officially called Taeyangho (Korean: 태양호; 'sun'), unofficially called the Moving Fortress and is likened to an Air Force One on rails.

== History ==
Trains have historically been used by many global leaders and royalty, but particularly military leaders, due to their high speed, security and ability to accommodate extensive office and personal facilities within one mobile location. The Kim family have used the trains when visiting army units and factories or travelling abroad.

Kim Jong Il's preference for the railroad transport was initially believed to be due to his fear of flying. However, Thae Yong-ho later clarified that Kim was distrustful and repulsed by North Korea's aging fleet of Russian aircraft. Recognizing the inefficiency and limitations of train travel, Kim repeatedly sought to acquire a used Boeing aircraft and later explored the possibility of obtaining an Airbus. In pursuit of this goal, he even attempted to establish diplomatic relations with France, but all such efforts ultimately failed, leaving him reliant on his armored train for travel.

In December 2011, it was reported by North Korean television that Kim Jong Il died while on a train during a domestic trip.

== Taeyangho ==
Over the years multiple trains – all called Taeyangho – were needed for security reasons. The trains have between 10 and 15 carriages, although the current train configuration is 20 armoured carriages excluding locomotives. It is unknown what model or type the locomotives and passenger cars are, although it is strongly hinted to be China's DF8s and 25G rolling stocks respectively. If true, the most recent train length (i.e. 2 locomotives with 20 cars) would be around 576 m (1,889.76 ft). The train has bulletproof glass and reinforced walls and floors to protect against explosives. Likewise, the train is heavily armed, with heavy weapons reportedly on board that range from at least two confirmed machine gun emplacements, to surface-to-air missiles and anti-tank guided missiles.

Some carriages are only used by the leader, like a bedroom and bathroom carriage, and others are troop sleeper carriages carrying security guards and medical staff. In 2001 the train included one residential carriage (named the headquarters carriage), a luxury restaurant carriage, and several transport carriages that contained two armoured Mercedes cars as well as an emergency helicopter that is likely to be an illegally obtained American MD 500C. In 2023, additional carriages were identified, including an office carriage for Kim Jong Un's work place, several gun and anti-aircraft carriages that house the aforementioned weapons, and a receptionist carriage for guests.

The train also had satellite communication system with satellite dish connecting all the carriages.

Parts of the interior of the trains are only known from the images and videos when a state leader was traveling. The interior of the receptionist carriage has completely changed since 1989 when it was brown. While meeting Chinese officials in 2018, the receptionist carriage had a wide white interior which was ringed with pink couches. In 2023 the receptionist carriage looked similar but with a blue-colored floor instead of a wooden floor.

There are conference rooms, with long tables and TV screens. The office carriage had a desk and chair; a map of China and the Korean peninsula on the wall behind it. Footage from 2020 showed a carriage decorated with flower-shaped lighting and zebra-printed fabric chairs.

== Operations ==
The trains are usually hauled by two power units. It was reported in 2009 that Kim Jong Il made use of a fleet of six personal trains, which are made up of 90 armored luxury railcars. Each armoured train has modern communications equipment, such as satellite phones, enabling the leader to obtain briefings and issue orders while traveling.

Security measures were increased after a 2004 explosion in Ryongchon near the border with China. The explosion, which was believed to have been caused by a train laden with oil and chemicals hitting power lines, occurred three hours after one of Kim's trains had passed through the area. This led to rumors that it might have been an assassination attempt.

After a train journey is confirmed, around 100 security officers check the route and stations in advance for possible dangers. A Mil Mi-4 helicopter is known to scout ahead to identify further threats forward. The area around the journey is cleared 24 hours before the three-train set travels. The electricity is turned off at stations so that other trains cannot run.

Now limited to 60 km/h (37 mph) due to the heavy weight, the Taeyangho travels with two additional auxiliary security armoured trains.

== Travels abroad ==
=== Kim Il Sung ===
Trains also have been used for travel abroad, with direct connection to China, and onward to Russia with a gauge-change. Kim Il Sung travelled regularly abroad by train until he died in 1994. Kim Il Sung's longest train journey took place in 1984 when he visited almost every socialist country in Eastern Europe. The train ride went via China, through the Soviet Union, with stops in Poland, East Germany, Czechoslovakia, Hungary, Yugoslavia, Bulgaria and Romania. The rest of the trip went through the Soviet Union, again.

When traveling to Russia the train wheels must be changed somewhere around the border because Russia has different rail gauges. A second train accompanied Kim's carrying bogies of the other gauge needed.

=== Kim Jong Il ===
On Kim Jong Il's visit to Russia in 2001, the train was reported to have had 22 carriages. According to Russian statesman Konstantin Pulikovsky, life on board was reported to be luxurious. Guests could choose at the luxury restaurant from Korean, Chinese, Japanese, Russian and French dishes. There were regular stops to stock up on live lobster and Bordeaux and Beaujolais wine flown in from Paris. Guests were entertained by singing female conductors. In April 2010, North Korea watchers inferred an unannounced visit to China by Kim, based on the supposed sighting of his train in the Chinese border city of Dandong; soon, however, it was learned that the train in question was just a regular cargo train, and Kim remained in North Korea. In August 2011, Kim Jong Il visited Ulan-Ude, Russia, roughly 4,500 kilometres (2,800 mi) by train from Pyongyang. In Ulan-Ude, he met Russian President Dmitry Medvedev.

=== Kim Jong Un ===
In March 2018, the Kim family's train was reportedly sighted in Beijing, which, along with heightened security around the Chinese government's Diaoyutai State Guesthouse led to speculation that Kim Jong Un and his wife Ri Sol-ju were visiting China. This was confirmed when they met with General Secretary of the Communist Party Xi Jinping and his wife Peng Liyuan. This marked the first time that North Korea's leader had left the country since taking power in 2011.

In February 2019, Kim travelled by train to the Hanoi Summit, where he met with US President Donald Trump for talks about denuclearization of the Korean Peninsula and lifting sanctions against North Korea. In April 2019, Kim took the train to meet with Russian President Vladimir Putin in Vladivostok.

In 2020, Kim travelled by train to visit a typhoon-hit area.

In September 2023, Kim's private train stopped at Khasan railway station to greet Russian officials on his way to another summit with Putin in the Russian Far East.

In September 2025, Kim traveled by train to attend the 2025 China Victory Day Parade, alongside his daughter Kim Ju Ae.

== Kim Il Sung's other rail vehicles ==
When providing "on-the-spot guidance" to the workers constructing Pyongyang Metro, Kim Il Sung used a special funicular-like vehicle to descend to a station under construction (it was riding in the inclined tunnel that was to be eventually used by the escalators), and a railbus to travel around the system. Both vehicles are now on display in the Pyongyang Metro Museum.

== See also ==
- Residences of North Korean leaders
- Rail transport in North Korea
- Trotsky's train
- Tito's Blue Train
- British Royal Train
- Presidential Railcars
