= MÁV Class 424 =

Class of 514 Hungarian 4-8-0 locomotives

MÁV class 424
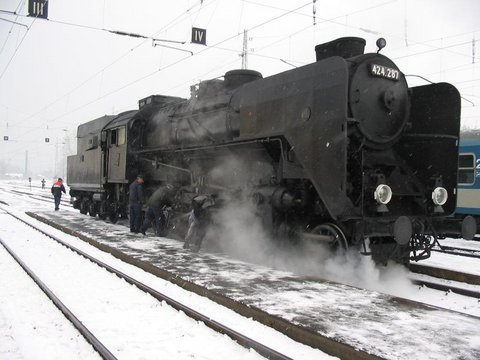
Type and origin
- Power type: Steam
- Builder: MÁVAG
- Build date: 1924–1958
- Total produced: 514
Specifications
- Configuration
  - Whyte: 4-8-0
  - UIC: 2′D h2
- Gauge: 1,435 mm (4 ft 8 1/2 in) standard gauge
- Driver dia.: 1,606 mm (63.23 in)
- Length: 20.79 m (68 ft 3 in)
- Loco weight: 83.2 tonnes (81.9 long tons; 91.7 short tons)
- Total weight: 137.7 tonnes (135.5 long tons; 151.8 short tons)
- Firebox
  - Grate area: 4.45 m^{2} (47.9 sq ft)
- Boiler pressure: 13 kg/cm^{2} (1.27 MPa; 185 psi)
- Heating surface: 162.6 m^{2} (1,750 sq ft)
- Superheater
  - Heating area: 68 m^{2} (730 sq ft)
- Cylinder size: 600 mm × 660 mm (23.62 in × 25.98 in)
Performance figures
- Maximum speed: 90 km/h

The MÁV class 424 is a class of Hungarian 4-8-0 steam locomotives with double-chimneys, and superheating. Its nicknames were "Buffalo" and "Nurmi" (after Paavo Nurmi, a famous Finnish runner well known in Hungary).

Locomotives of the same design operated in Yugoslavia as JŽ class 11.

Fifteen were supplied to North Korea as war aid during the Korean War; these kept their MÁV running numbers (424.006 through 424.020) in Korean State Railway service. These went to Záhony on the Hungarian–Soviet border under their own power, where they were disassembled and shipped via the USSR to China; in China they were reassembled and delivered to North Korea under their own power.

== Description ==
MÁVAG began to manufacture the Class 424 in 1924, with 2′D axle layout (4-8-0 in Whyte notation). It made its first test run between Budapest and Vác on 22 April 1924. The planning was led by Béla Kertész (1882–1970) locomotive constructor.

The 424 was a universal main line locomotive. It was used to haul heavy freight trains, stopping trains and express trains. The 424 locomotives are well known abroad as well. 514 examples had been built when production ended in 1958, of which 149 were for foreign orders. They remained in service until 1984, when steam engines were withdrawn in Hungary.

The 424s were coal burners by design. In the early 1960s some engines were converted to burn oil, but their performance did not increase enough to compete with the diesel equipment of that time, like NOHAB DSB engines and Soviet-made M62s.

== Preservation ==
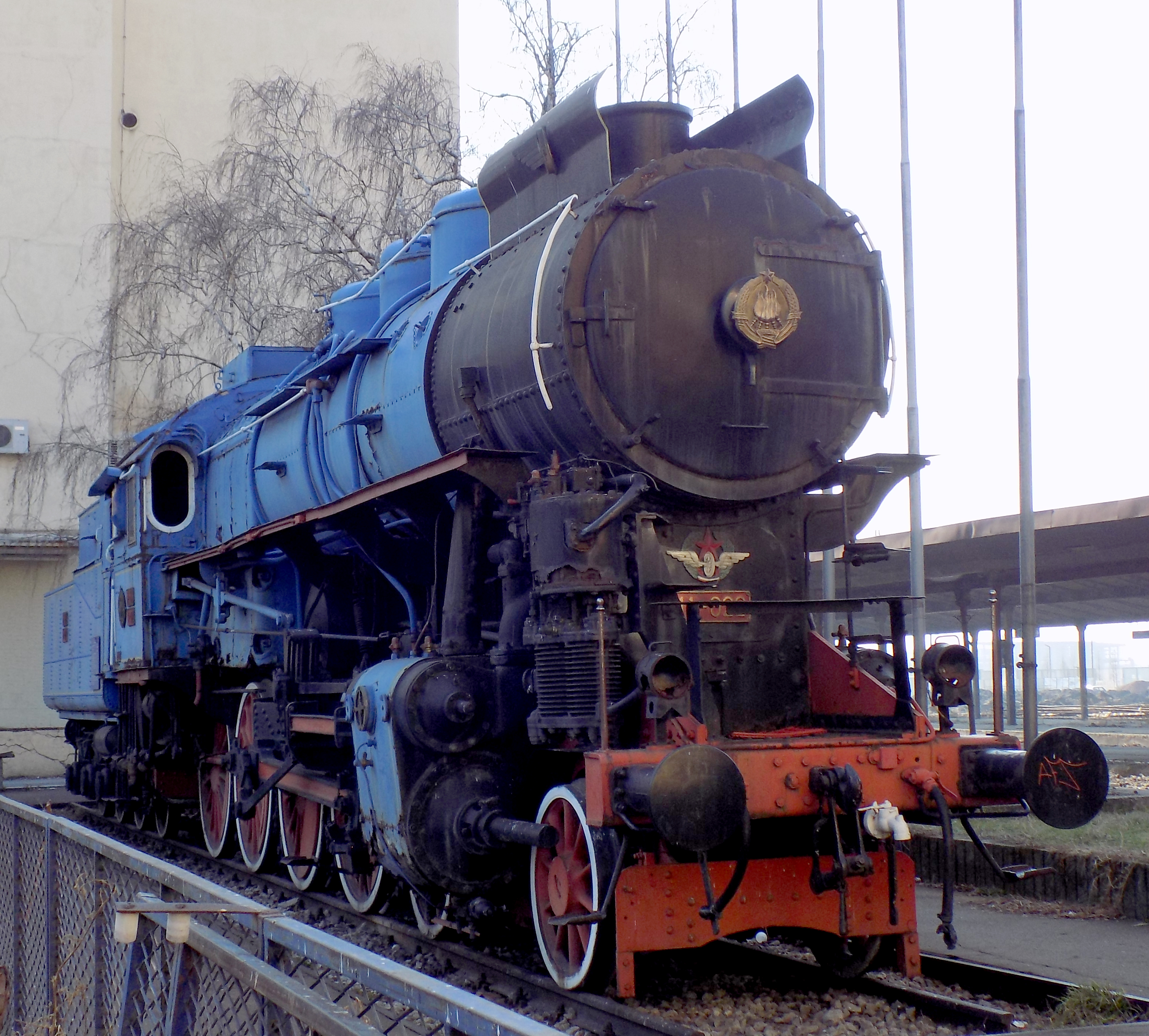
A JŽ class 11 (MÁV class 424) in Belgrade that was used for Tito's Blue Train.

=== Operational ===
Two working examples (424.009 and 424.247) were preserved and used for historical and excursion trains.

Number	Manufacturer	Built	Location	Image	Notes
424.009	MÁVAG	1924	Istvántelek Works, Budapest		
424.247	MÁVAG	1955	Istvántelek Works, Budapest		

=== Plinthed exhibits ===
A few engines are exhibited on static display.

- 424.001 was accommodated at the Zagreb Railway Station, lately moved to Budapest and displayed in front of the Museum of Transportation.
- 424.124 is exhibited on the main station of Dombóvár (in the county of Tolna, found in central Hungary). The vehicle shows the times of the socialist era, with the red star in the front of the water tank.
- 424.309 is exhibited on the main station of Nagykanizsa
- MÁV 424.320 is plinthed at Szolnok station.
- MÁV 424.353 is exposed on Tokaj Station, North-Est of Hungary.

== See also ==
- Tito's Blue Train
- Yugoslav Railways
- Hungarian Railways
- Serbian Railways
