= Tito's Blue Train =

Former state train of the Yugoslav president

Blue Train
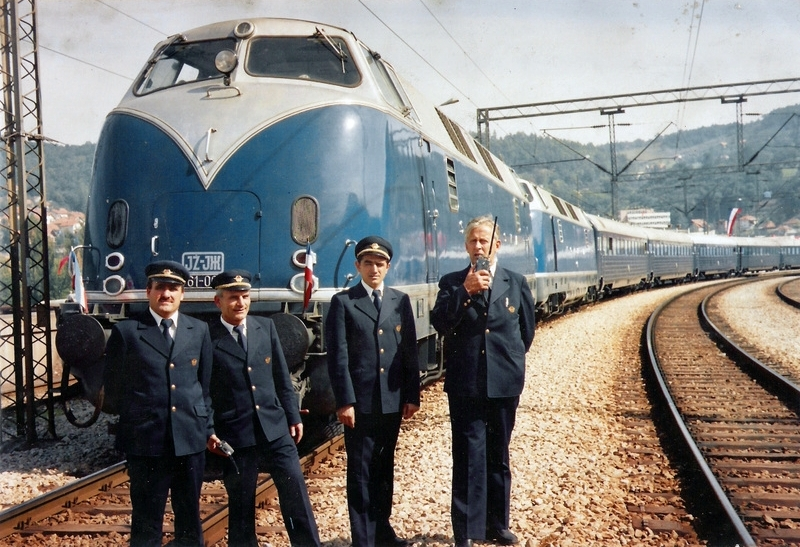
- The Blue train at the opening of the final section of the Belgrade–Bar railway with two JŽ D66/761s, its crew in the foreground, 28 May 1976.

Overview
- Service type: Passenger train
- First service: 1946 (service); 1956 (name)
- Current operator: Serbian Railways
- Former operator: Yugoslav Railways

Route
- Line used: Sarajevo–Ploče line Belgrade–Bar line

Technical
- Rolling stock: JŽ class 11; JŽ D66/761s; JŽ 666
- Track gauge: 1,435 mm (4 ft 8 1/2 in)
- Operating speed: 140 km/h (85 mph)

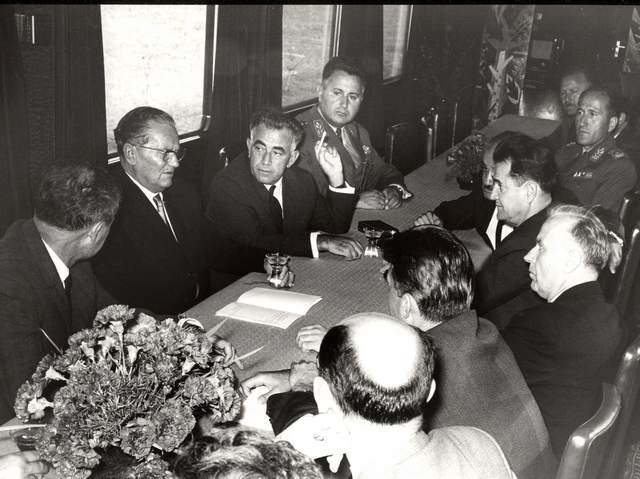
The conference car of Tito's Blue Train.

Tito's Blue Train (Serbian: Плави воз, romanized: Plavi voz; Croatian: Plavi vlak; Slovene: Modri vlak; Macedonian: Синиот воз, romanized: Siniot voz) is the popular name of the former state luxury train of Yugoslav Marshal Josip Broz Tito, president of the former Yugoslavia. More than 60 statesmen and world leaders traveled on the blue train during its service. Some of the surviving rolling stock is now operated as a tourist attraction on the 476-kilometre (296 mi) Belgrade–Bar railway, between Belgrade, capital of Serbia, and Bar, a coastal town in Montenegro.

== Tito's era ==
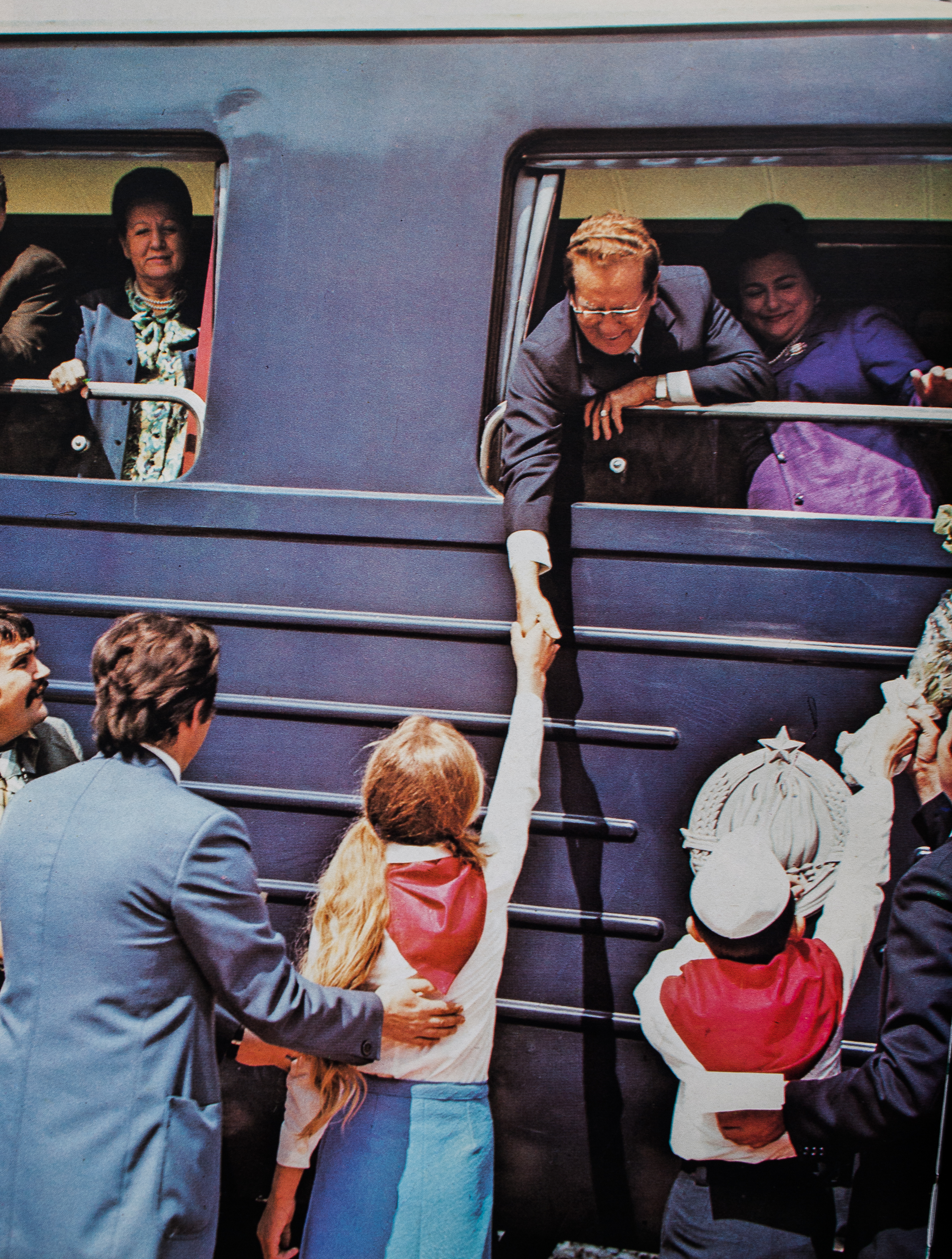
Tito and his wife onboard the Blue train during the opening of the Belgrade–Bar railway

Officially, a state train was first used by Tito in 1946. Blue-painted saloon carriages specially made for Tito and blue-painted locomotives were used as vehicles from 1956. The wagon construction factories GOŠA in Smederevska Palanka and Boris Kidrič in Maribor were commissioned to build the wagons. Fine woods (mahogany, walnut and cherry) were used for the interior, complete with Art Deco interior design features. In addition to Tito's saloon car with its cabinet room, the composition also had a dining car, as well as a covered transport vehicle. The operational station of the Plavi voz was and is the Topčider station in the prominent district of Dedinje, not far from Tito's Belgrade residence. Tito traveled over 600,000-kilometre (370,000-mile) on the Blue Train, traveling on the tracks through Yugoslavia but also outside of it to: France, Poland, Austria, Hungary, Romania, Bulgaria, Greece and the USSR. It was also used to take Tito and his wife to the Brijuni islands in Croatia during the summer and hostings meetings with important foreign dignitaries. Among those who travelled on the train as Tito's guests were Haile Selassie, François Mitterrand, Yasser Arafat, Jawaharlal Nehru, Sukarno and, in October 1972, Queen Elizabeth II. After Tito's death the train transported his coffin from Ljubljana to Belgrade.

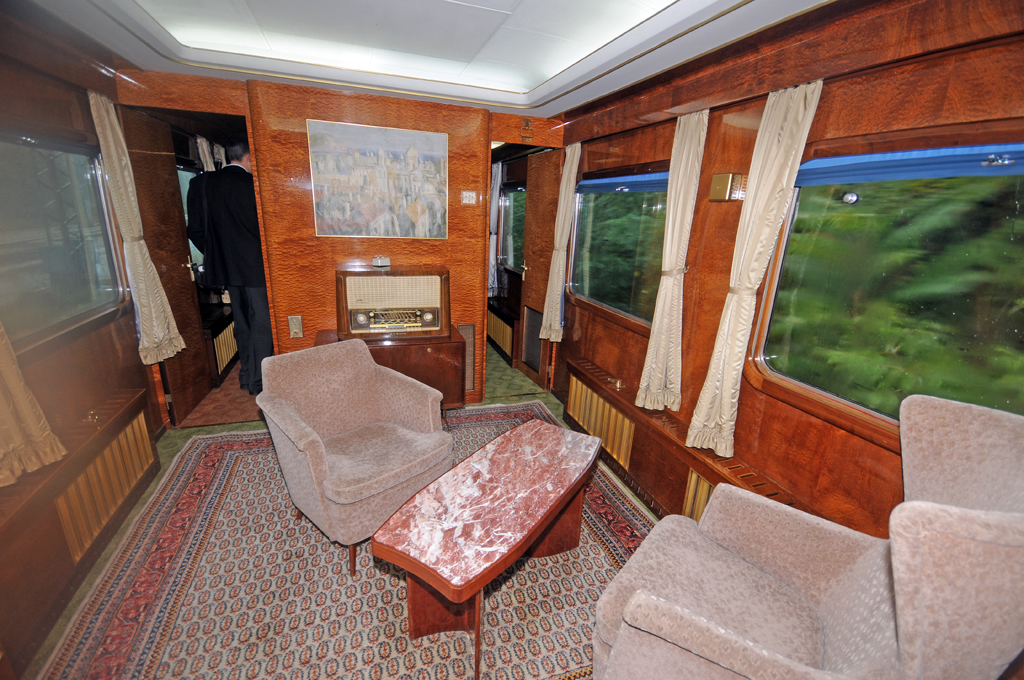
The lounge on Tito's Blue Train.

== Train compositions ==
The Blue Train has a formal lounge with a dining room, three lounge cars with apartments, a kitchen, a restaurant and a special closed baggage car for transporting cars. It has a total of 92 places, and the full capacity of the sleeping cars is 90 beds. The interior of the train is made mostly of wood. Mahogany, pear and walnut were used, and the lounges and corridors were decorated with inlays.

=== Kola restaurant (series WR, 88-69) ===
This car, consisting of a dining room with 28 seats, a lounge with 8 seats, a bar and kitchen, had a maximum traffic speed of 140 km/h. "NO" exchange mode; as a result the unit can travel only in the Blue train set. The cars have a sound system (internal, which is two-channel and external) and telephone installations. The car is heated by steam.

=== Salon apartments (Salon series, 89-69) ===
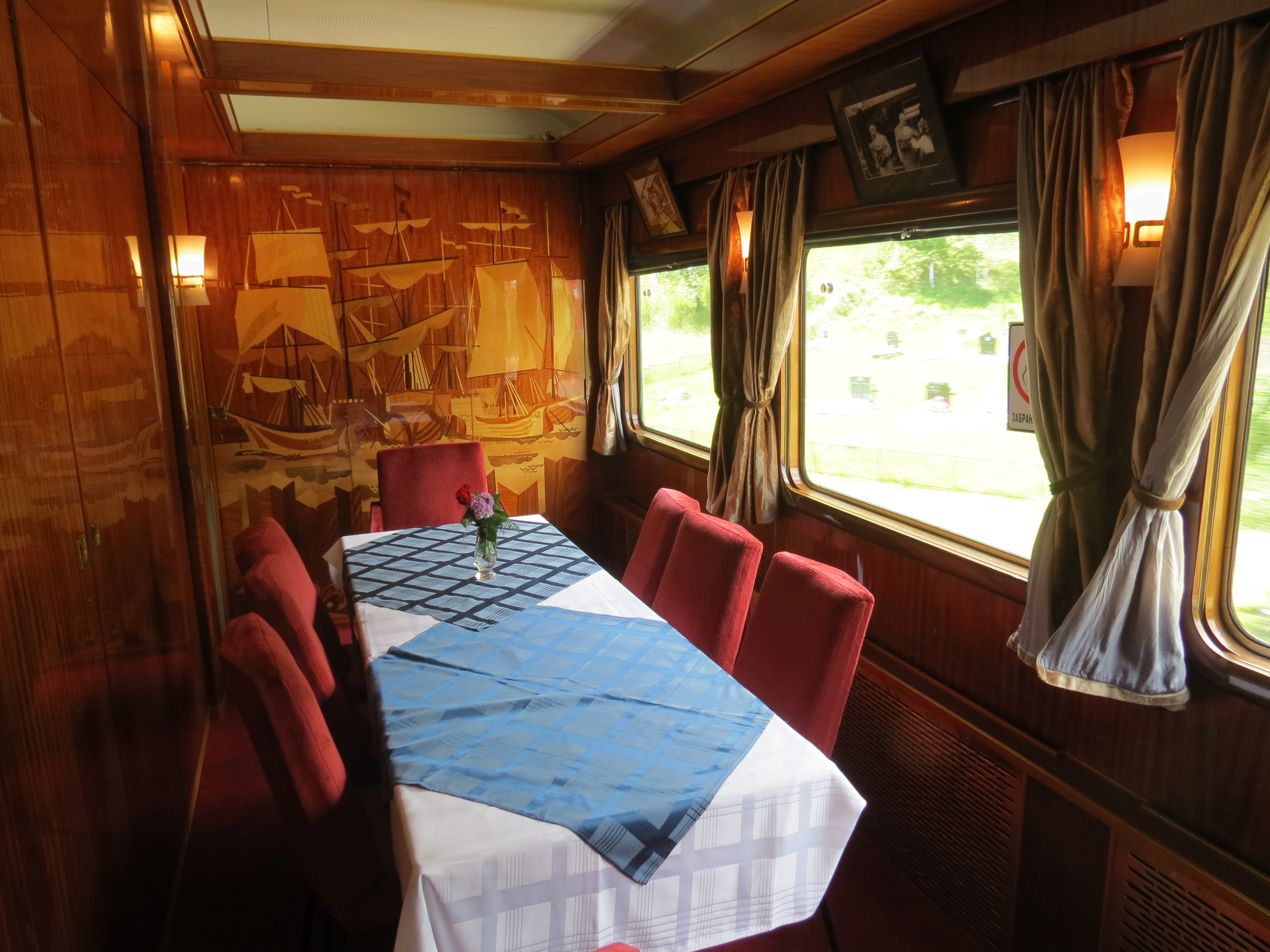
8 seat Salon car, with conference table

The first round was Josip Broz's salon - apartment. They are air-conditioned and consist of two suites with one bed each, a study, a bathroom, a lounge area, two armchairs, and a wardrobe with a “annexe” lined walls in silk wallpaper used by the president’s “companion”. The other cars have two luxurious and four double beds, a work cabinet, a bathroom, a lounge for eight people and a kitchenette. They are air-conditioned. The maximum speed of these cars is 140 km/h (85 mph). "NO" exchange mode. They can travel only in the Blue train set. The cars have a sound system (internal, which is two-channel and external) and telephone installations, and steam heated.

=== Formal salon – dining room (Salon series, 89-69) ===
These saloon cars are air-conditioned. The banquet hall has a capacity of 28 seats, while the lounge area has 10 armchair seats. The cars are equipped with a full-channel sound system and a cinema projector. The car's maximum speed is 140 km/h (85 mph). "NO" exchange mode. They can travel only in the Blue train set. The cars also have telephone installations. The car is heated by steam.

=== Kola – kitchen (series SK, 88-69) ===
The cars of the SK series are kitchen cars and must be coupled with energy cars from the Blue Train. Meal preparation capacity is 300 meals. They can travel only in the Blue train set. The circuit is powered by electricity 3 x 300 volts, 50 Hz, and heated by steam. The cars are equipped with telephone and sound system installations (internal, which is two-channel and external). The maximum traffic speed is 140 km/h (85 mph). "NO" exchange mode.

=== Cars for transporting cars (series MD, 98-30) ===
Cars of the MD series are closed single-deck luggage cars for transporting cars. They are equipped with devices for washing the car during the trip. It can travel in regular trains. The capacity of the MD car is 4 cars. The maximum permitted height of vehicles that can be loaded is 1.75 meters. The car has a through-line electric heating system, its own HAGENUK heating, two or one extra bed for the car companion. The maximum speed 140 km/h (85 mph). "NO" exchange mode.

=== Salon cars (Salon series, 09-80) ===
The capacity of the car is ten double beds and one single (6 cabins). They have a lounge area, a vacuum toilet, a bathroom in the main cabin, a kitchen. The cars are air-conditioned. The maximum speed of these cars is 160 km/h. "RIC" exchange mode. Circuit type "Z". It can travel in regular trains. The cars are not part of the Blue Train. They have a 56 kW MERCEDES diesel generator and a HAGENUK multi-system car heating device with the option of choosing a heating source: electricity, oil or steam.

=== Staff ===
In addition to rolling stock, the staff in the Special Train Service was also necessary to efficiently operate the special train. It numbered from 20 to 32 workers with a tendency to reduce them in accordance with the modernization of work and the transfer of some jobs to the then ŽTO.

=== Locomotives ===
The first dedicated locomotives for the Blue Train were three repainted JŽ class 11 4-8-0; one of them is now preserved in Belgrade. They were replaced by three Krauss-Maffei ML 2200 C'C' purchased from West Germany. These were classified as JŽ D66/761 engines and were based on DB Class V 200.

In 1978, four Electro-Motive Division EMD JT22CW-2 locomotives, designated as ŽS series 666, were acquired by Yugoslav Railways for use with the train, hence their all-blue livery. All four are no longer operational and stored, awaiting full overhaul. They were named after World War II battles:

- 001 – Dinara
- 002 – Kozara
- 003 – Sutjeska
- 004 – Neretva
Locomotives of Tito's Blue Train

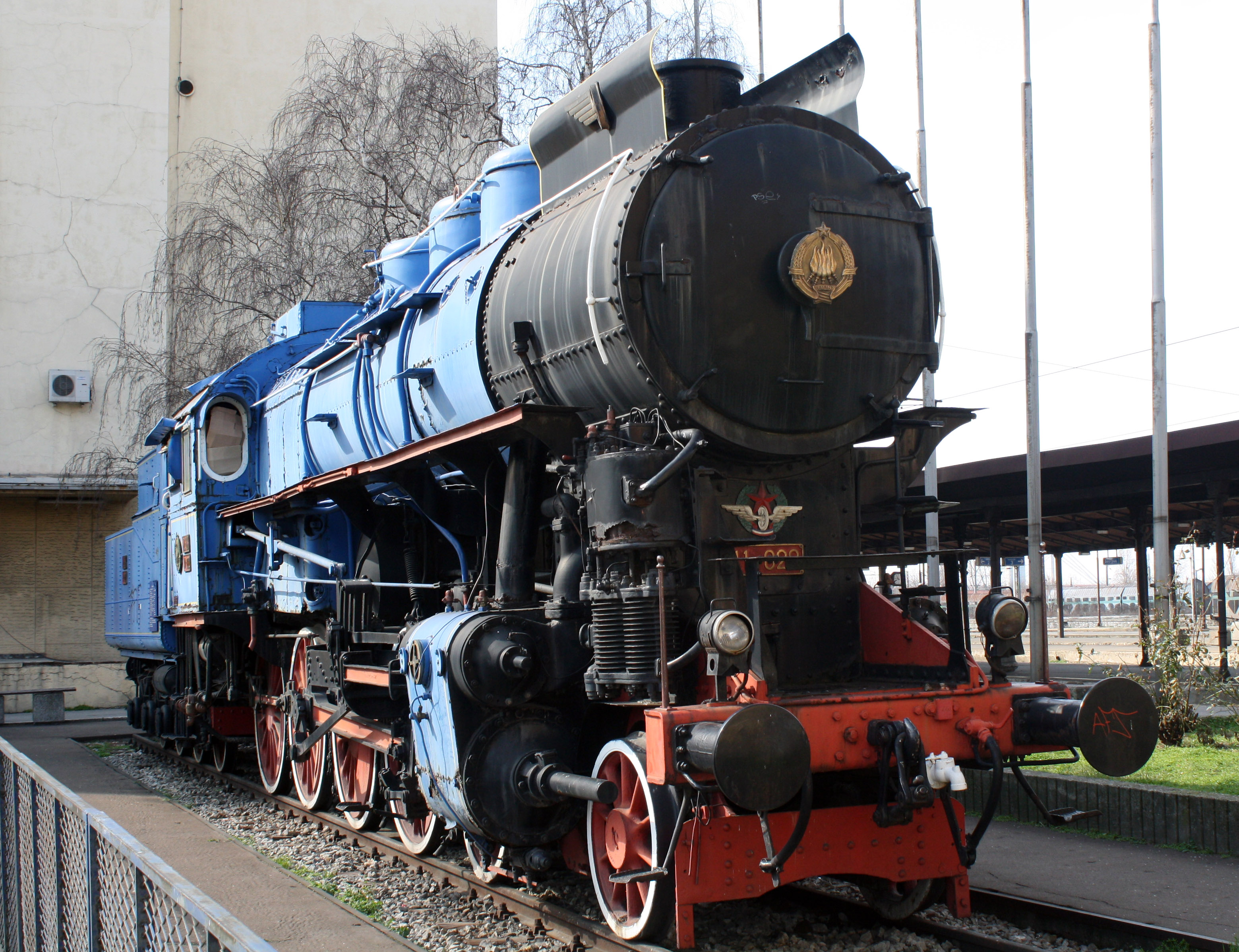
A JŽ class 11 in that was used for Tito's Blue Train, on display in front of the former Belgrade central station.

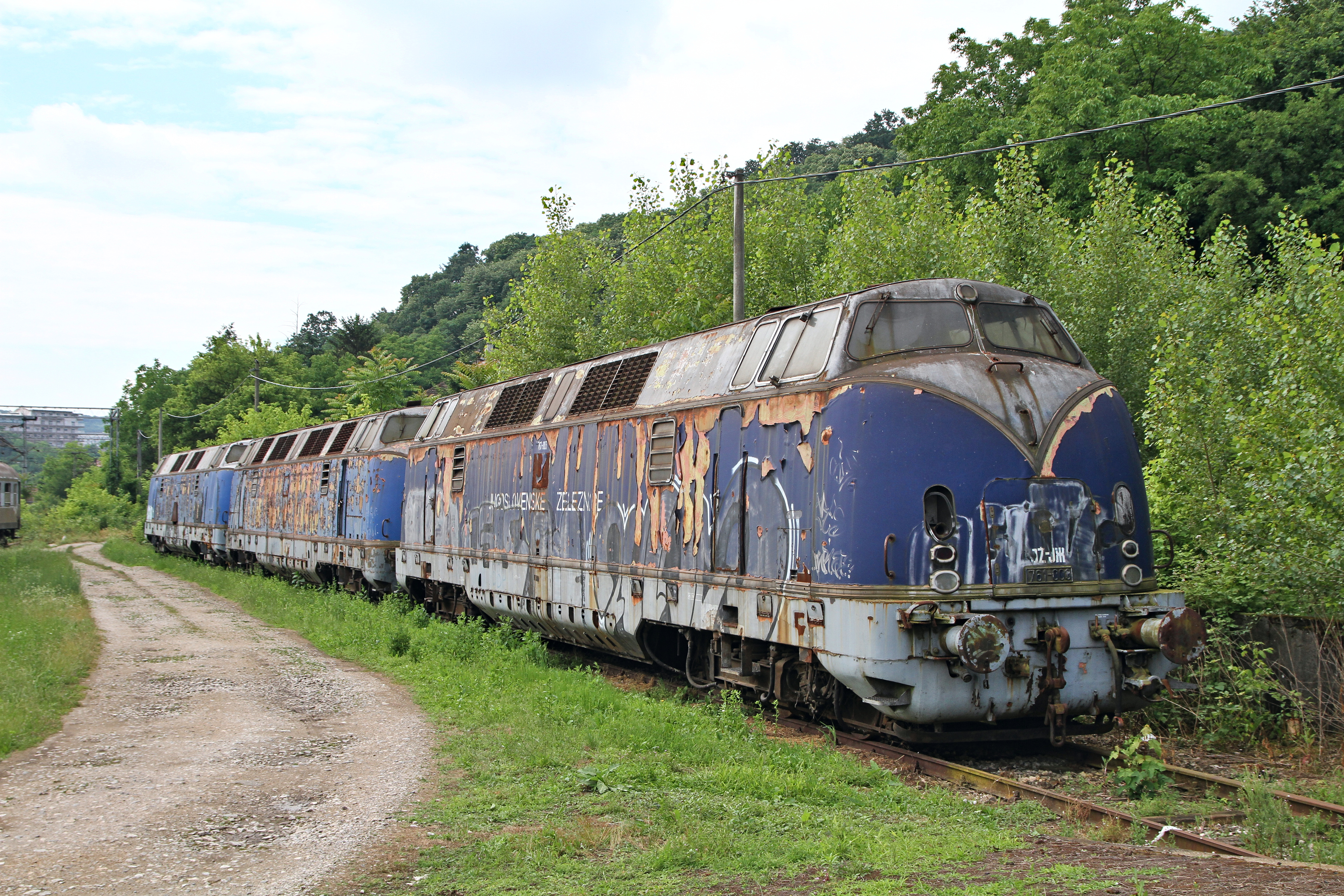
JŽ D66/761s (DB Class V 200 based engines) of Tito's Blue Train.

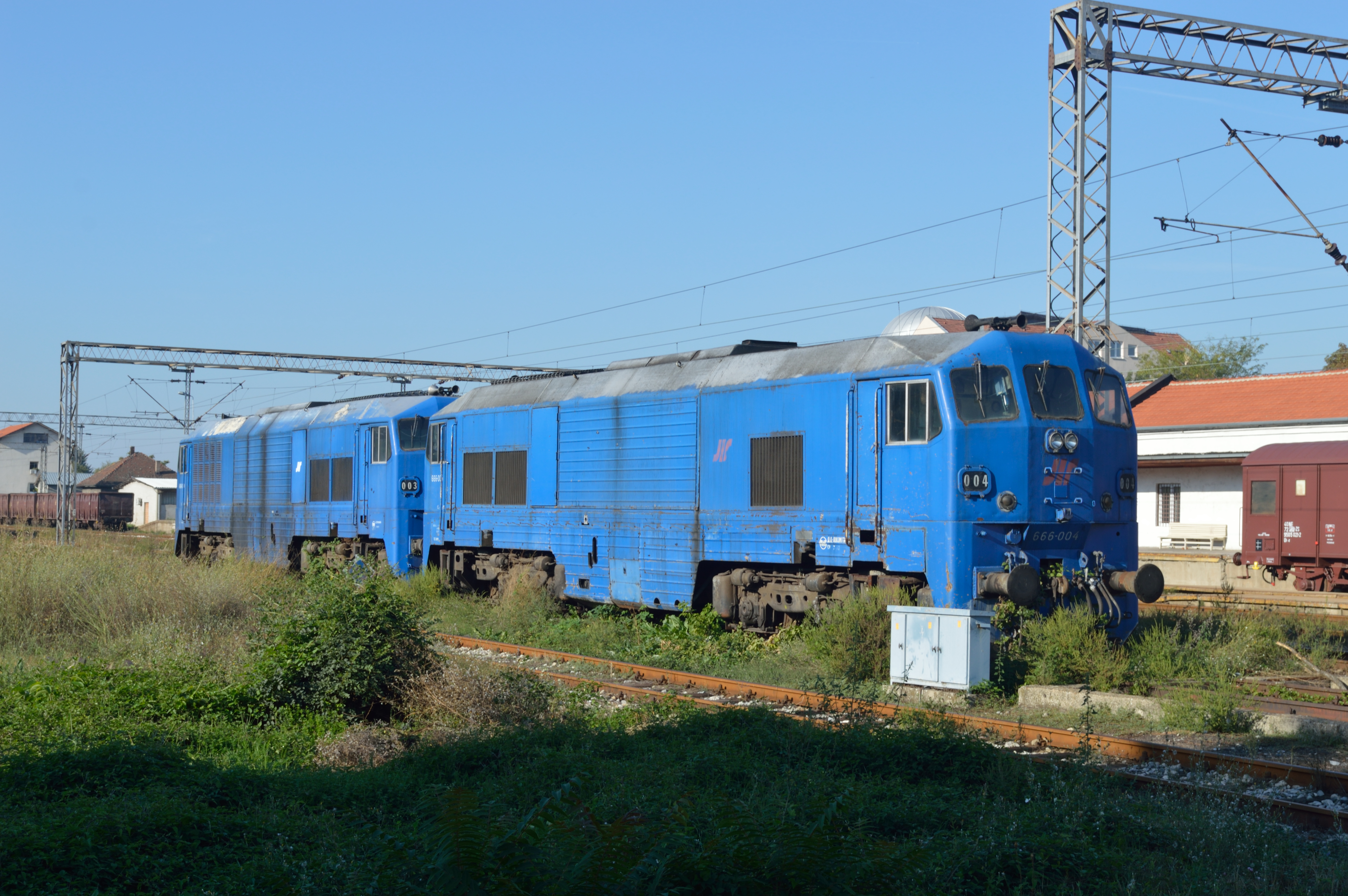
JŽ 666 (EMD JT22CW-2) locomotives 666.003 and 666.004.

=== Self-propelled railcar ===
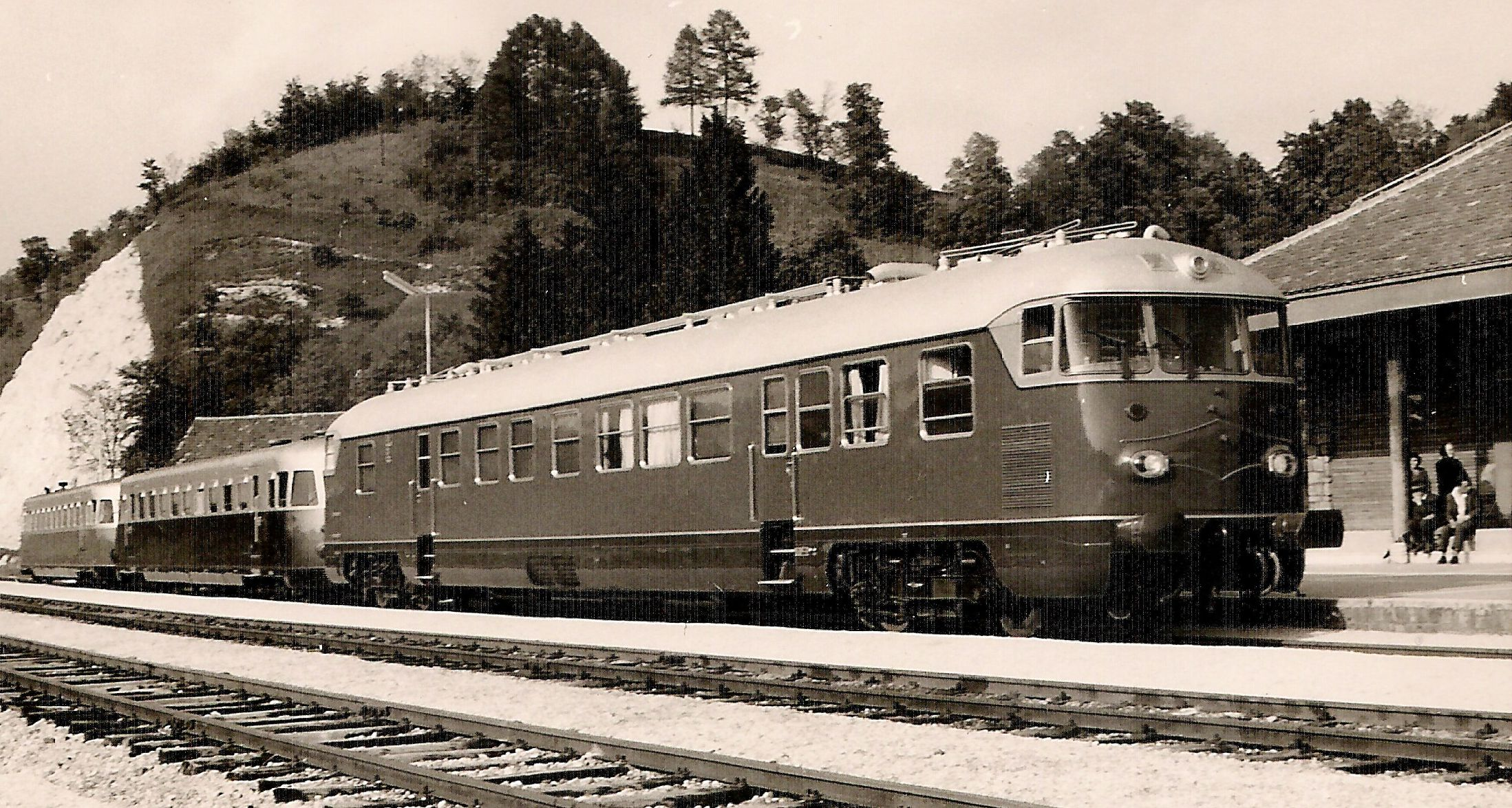
TDiesel engine train.

The Blue Train includes a self-propelled motor saloon and an apartment-type saloon trailer with air conditioning, built in Germany in 1961 and extended in 1962 in Maribor. The capacity of the self-propelled salon is six cabins (12 double beds); the salon has a kitchen, its own heating source and the possibility of electric heating from a diesel generator. The train has two independent diesel engines and develops a speed of 120 km/h.

== After Tito ==
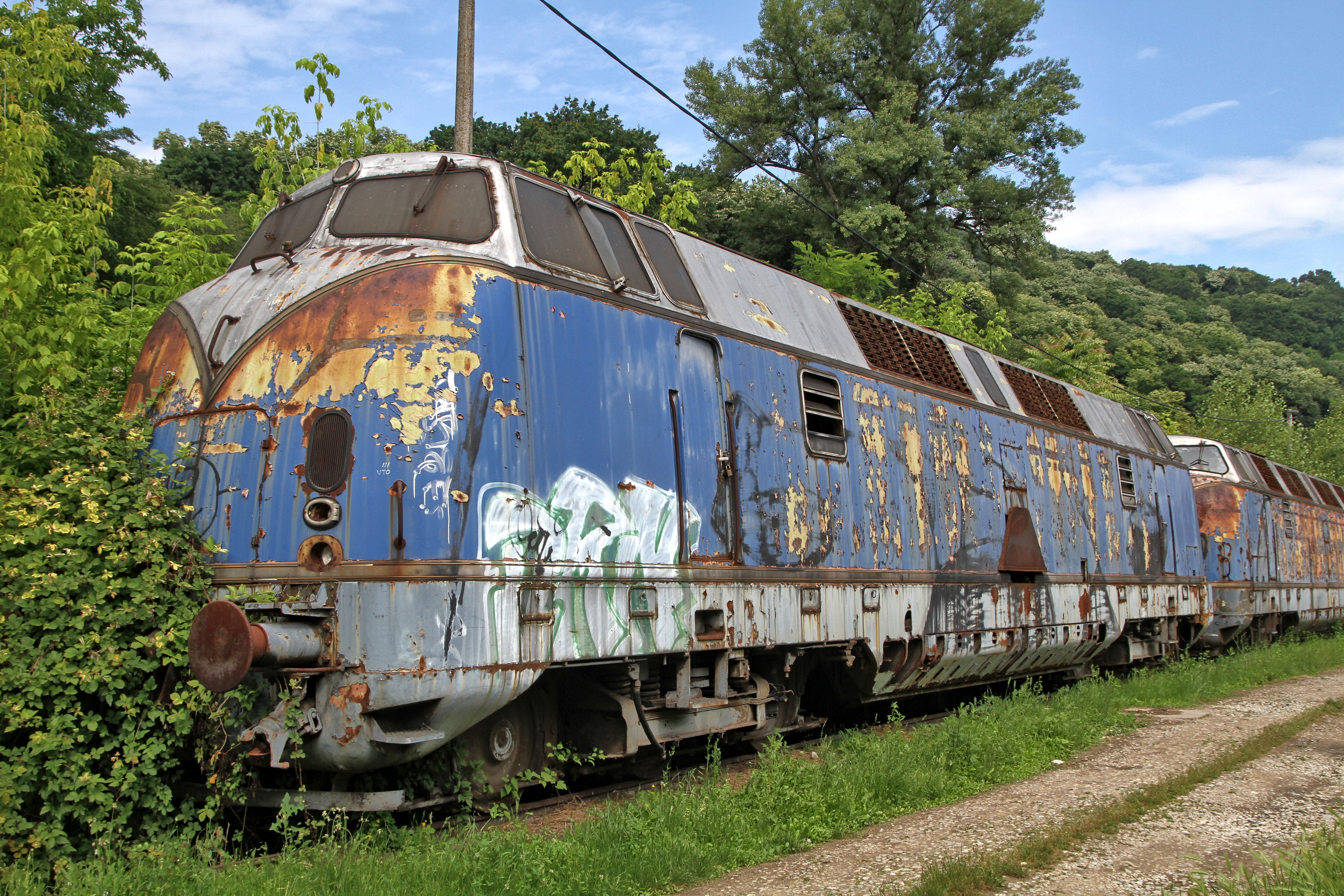
JŽ D66/761 as it looks stored at Topčider, (2016)

The train carried Tito with his wife Jovanka for the last time to transfer Tito's body from Ljubljana via Zagreb to Belgrade on 5 May 1980. In the days between the death of the president and the state funeral, Yugoslav media showed crowds of citizens standing along the train's route in Slovenia, Croatia and Serbia to pay their respects.

The Blue Train's last official state tour was conducted under President Slobodan Milošević during the celebration of the 600th anniversary of the Battle of the Field of Blackbirds on 28 June 1989 by taking the Blue train to Gazimestan, where Milošević delivered his Gazimestan speech. After that, the Plavi voz was no longer used as a symbol of a state and power insignia for official public events. In the years that followed, as Yugoslavia broke up, the Blue Train was left in siding sheds at the Topčider depot in Belgrade, and the locomotives were used to haul freight and passenger trains. The carriages sat unused until 2004, when they were opened to members of the general public, and domestic and foreign tourists began to visit them. For the first time, ordinary people had the opportunity to see for themselves the previously unattainable luxury of the train, which had been used by more than sixty foreign statesmen and state delegations. Since 2007, parts of Blue train have been used for tourist trips. Since the end of 2009, one composition with a saloon wagon has been running on the Belgrade–Bar railway line every day. Some of the non-functioning carriages and rolling stock can be visited for a fee.

== Gallery ==
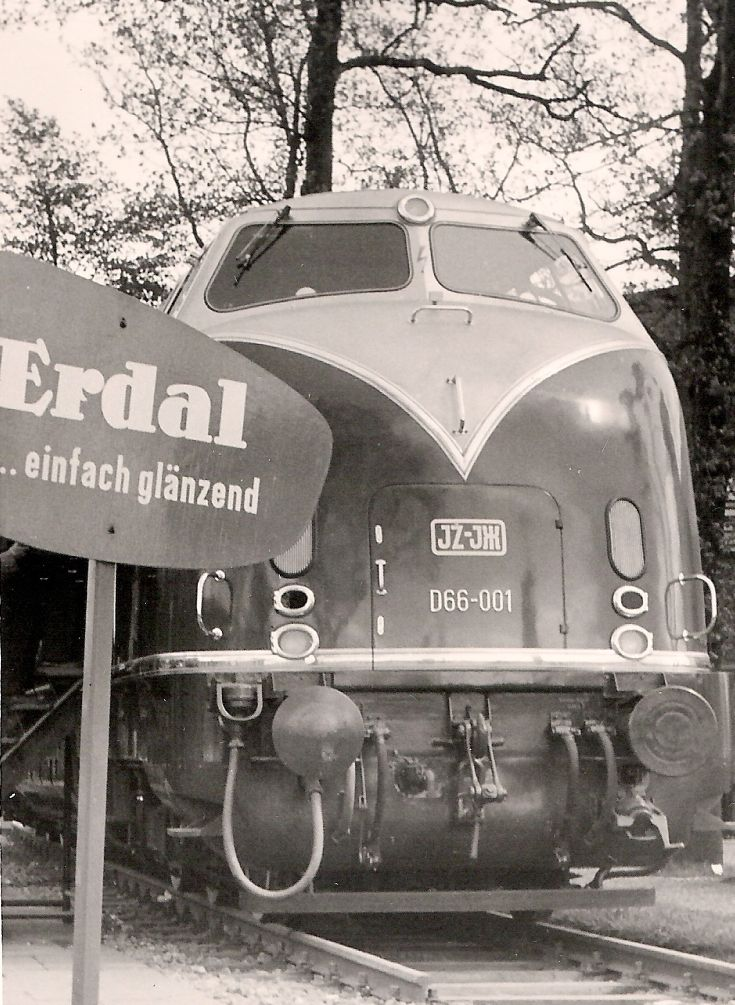
Six-axle Krauss-Maffei diesel locomotive ML 2200 CC for the Yugoslav State Railways, April 1957

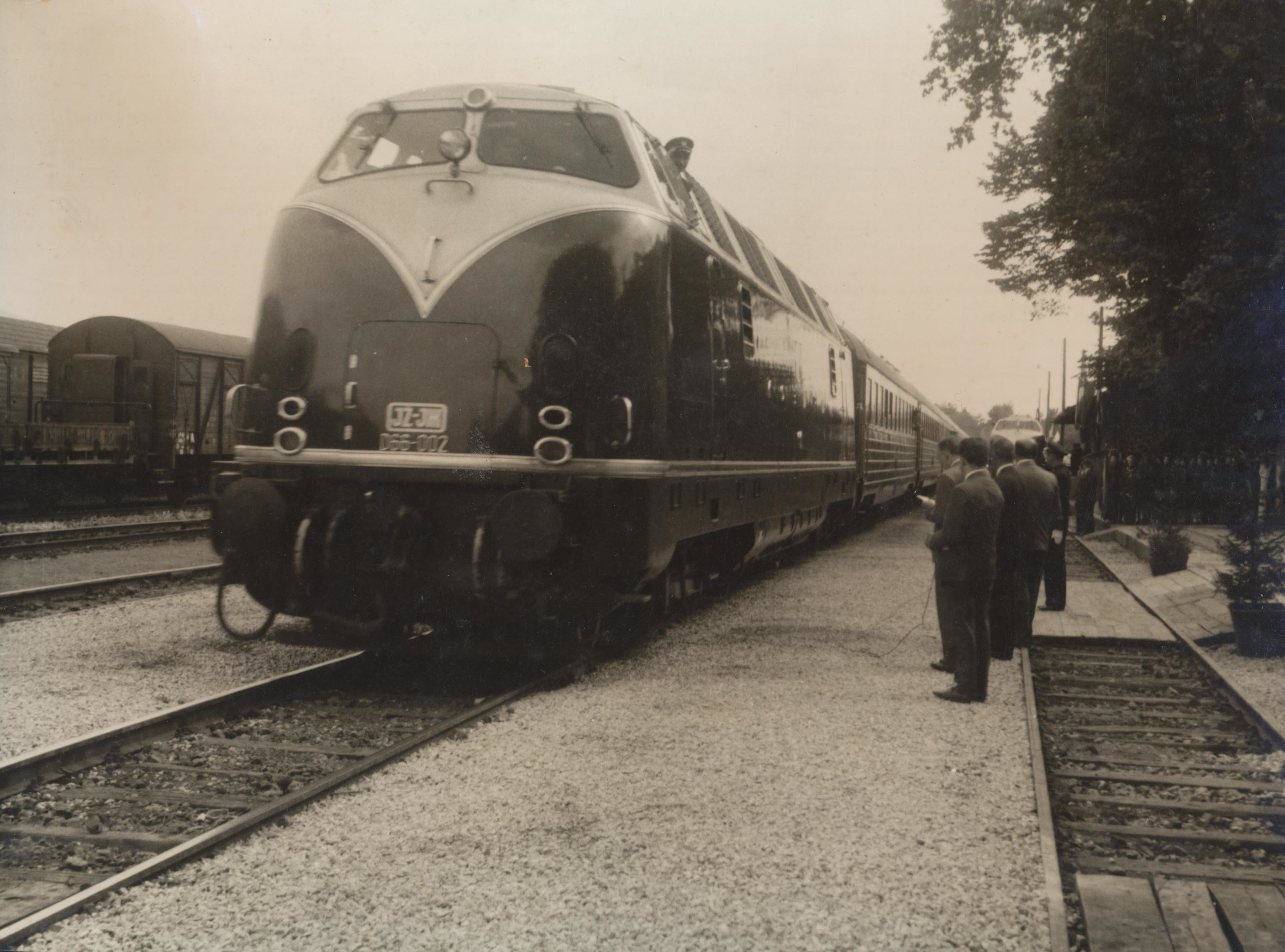
Blue train in Pirot, 29 September 1965.

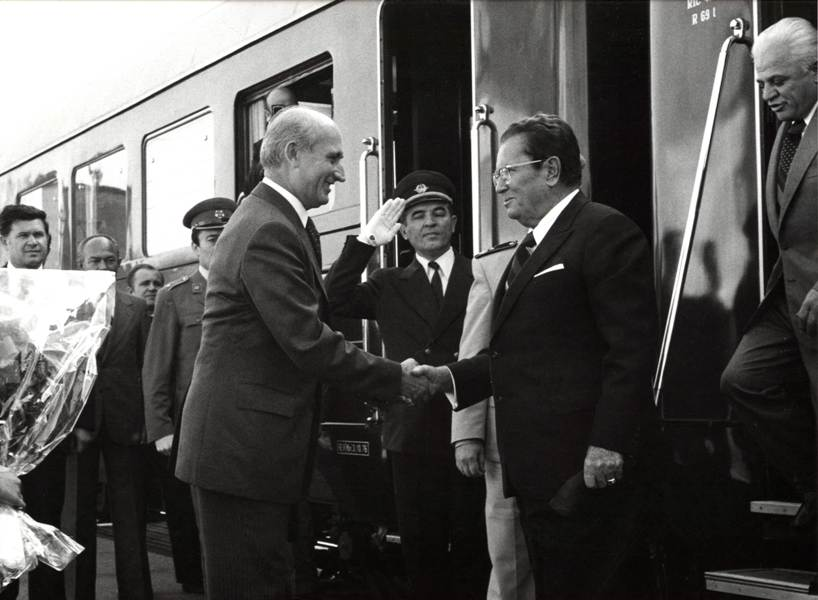
Major Nandor at the reception of President Tito, Šid 30 September 1977

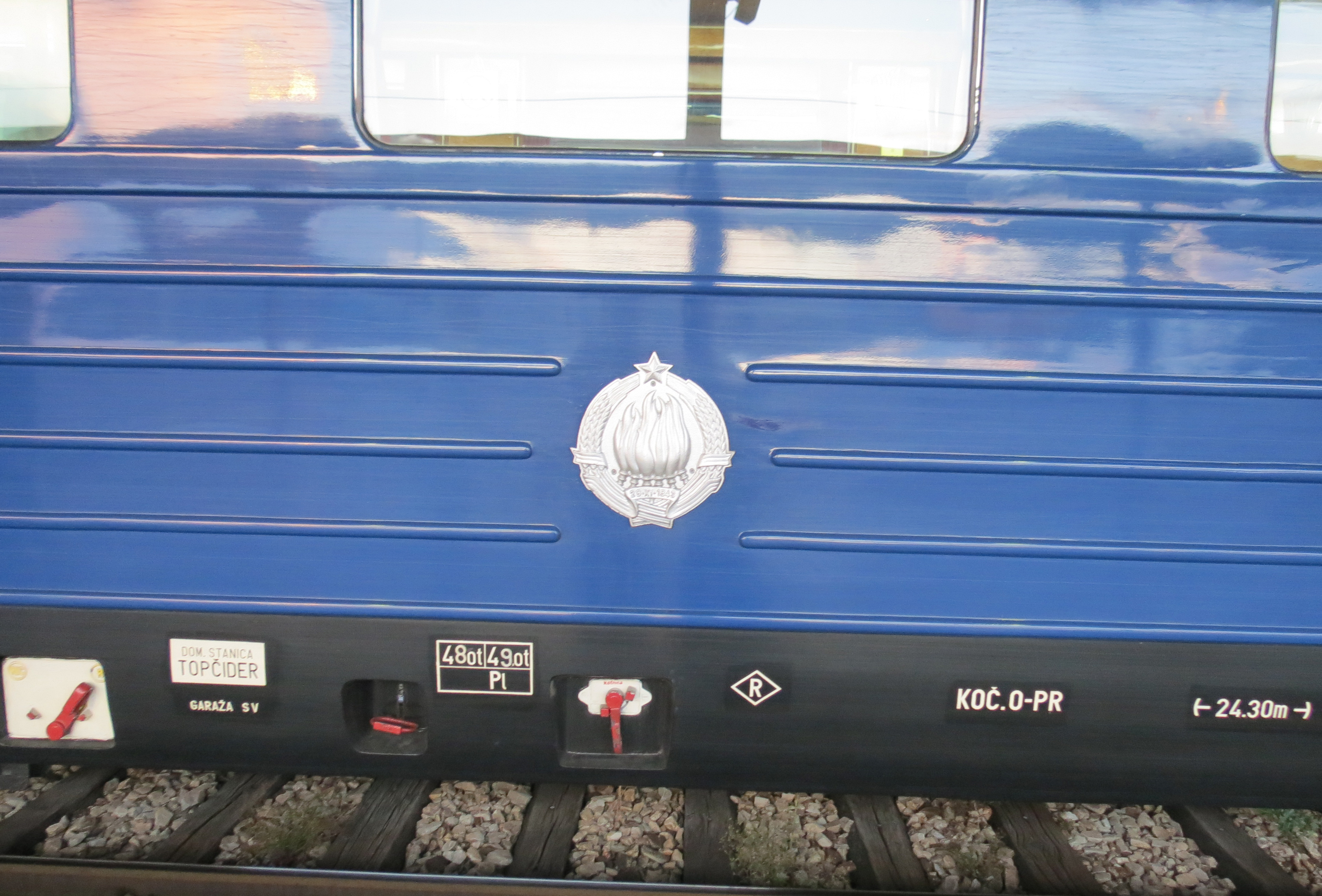
Crest of the SFRJ

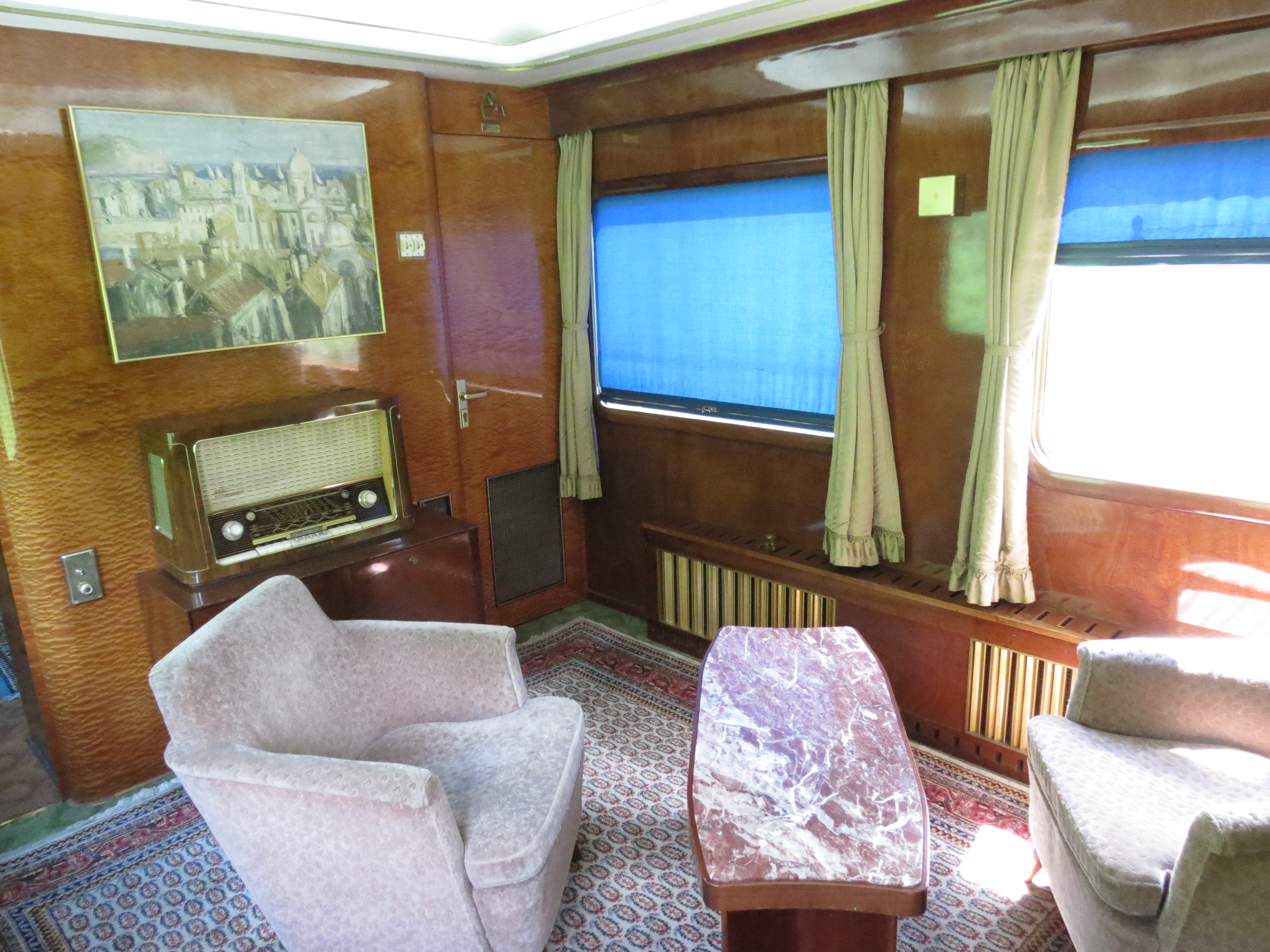
Small private salon

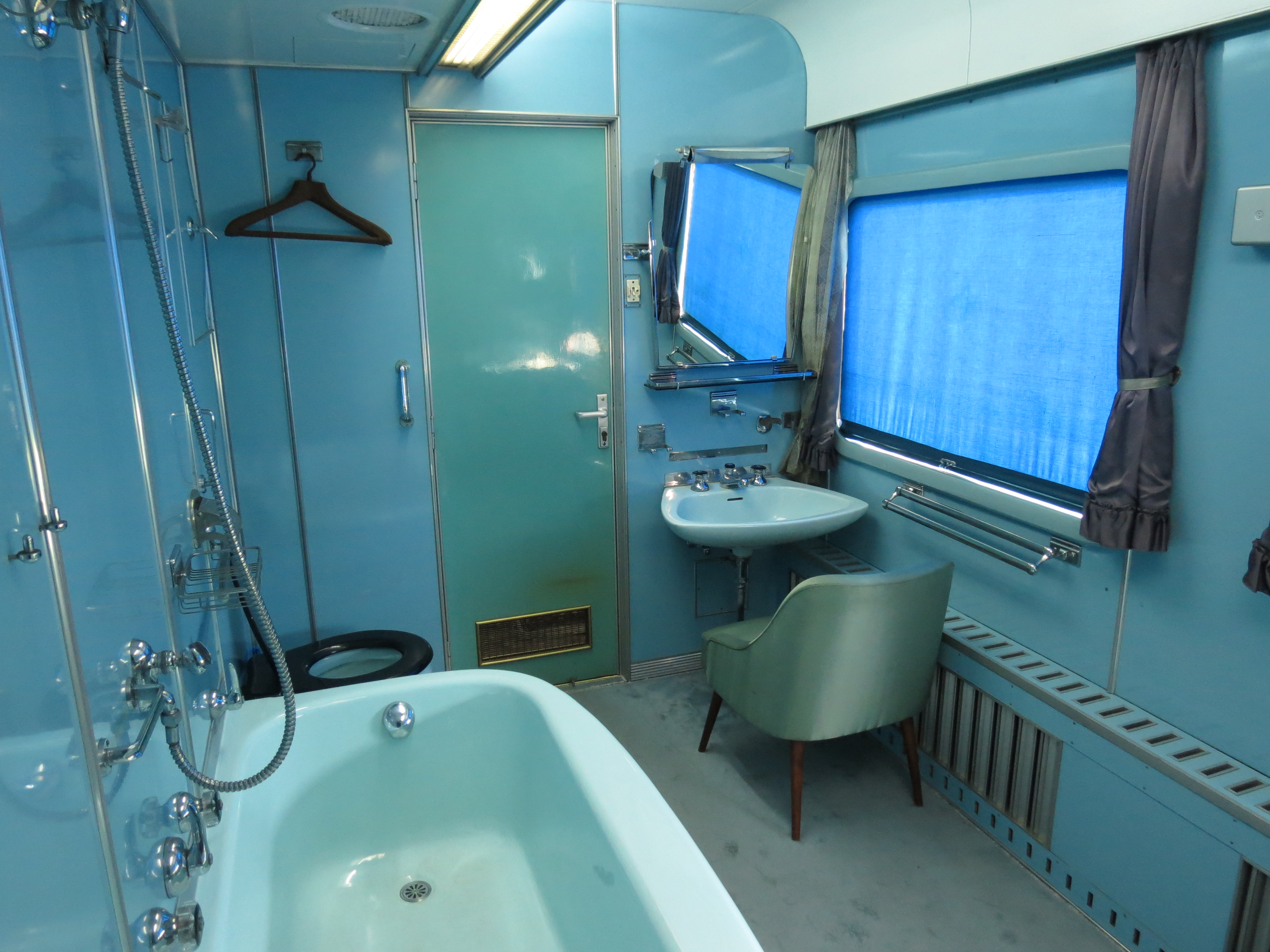
Bathroom

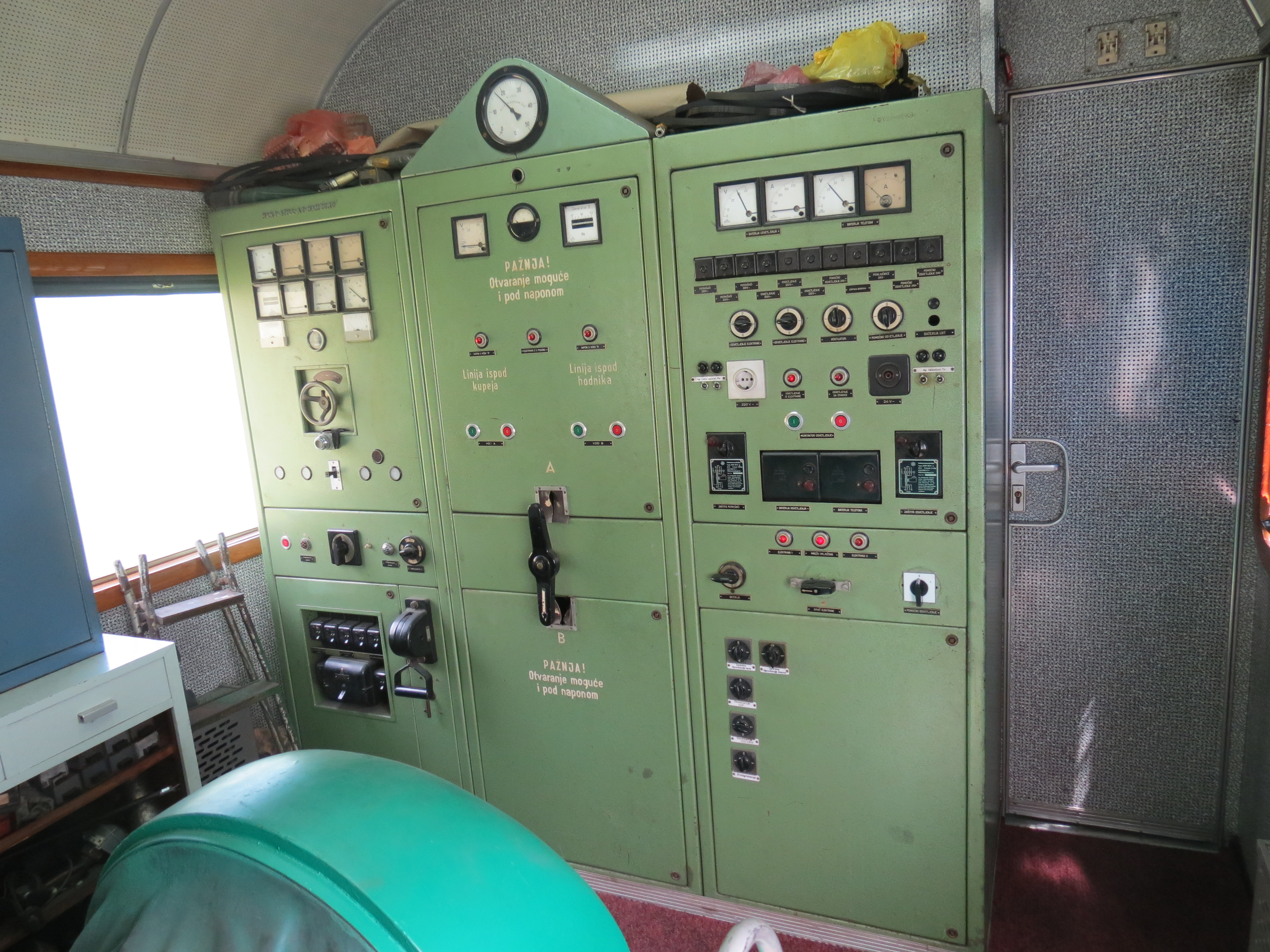
Engine room

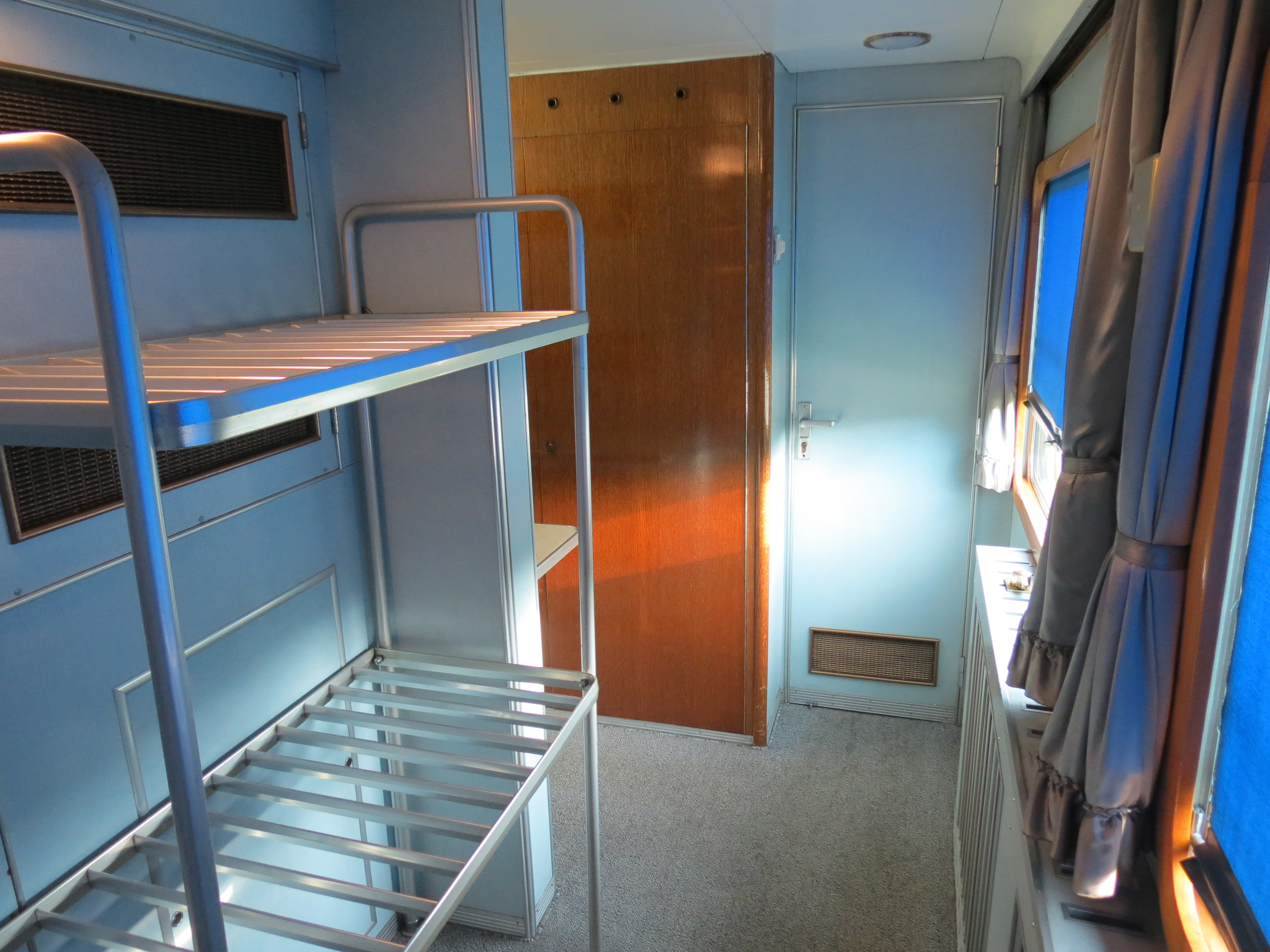
Storage cabin

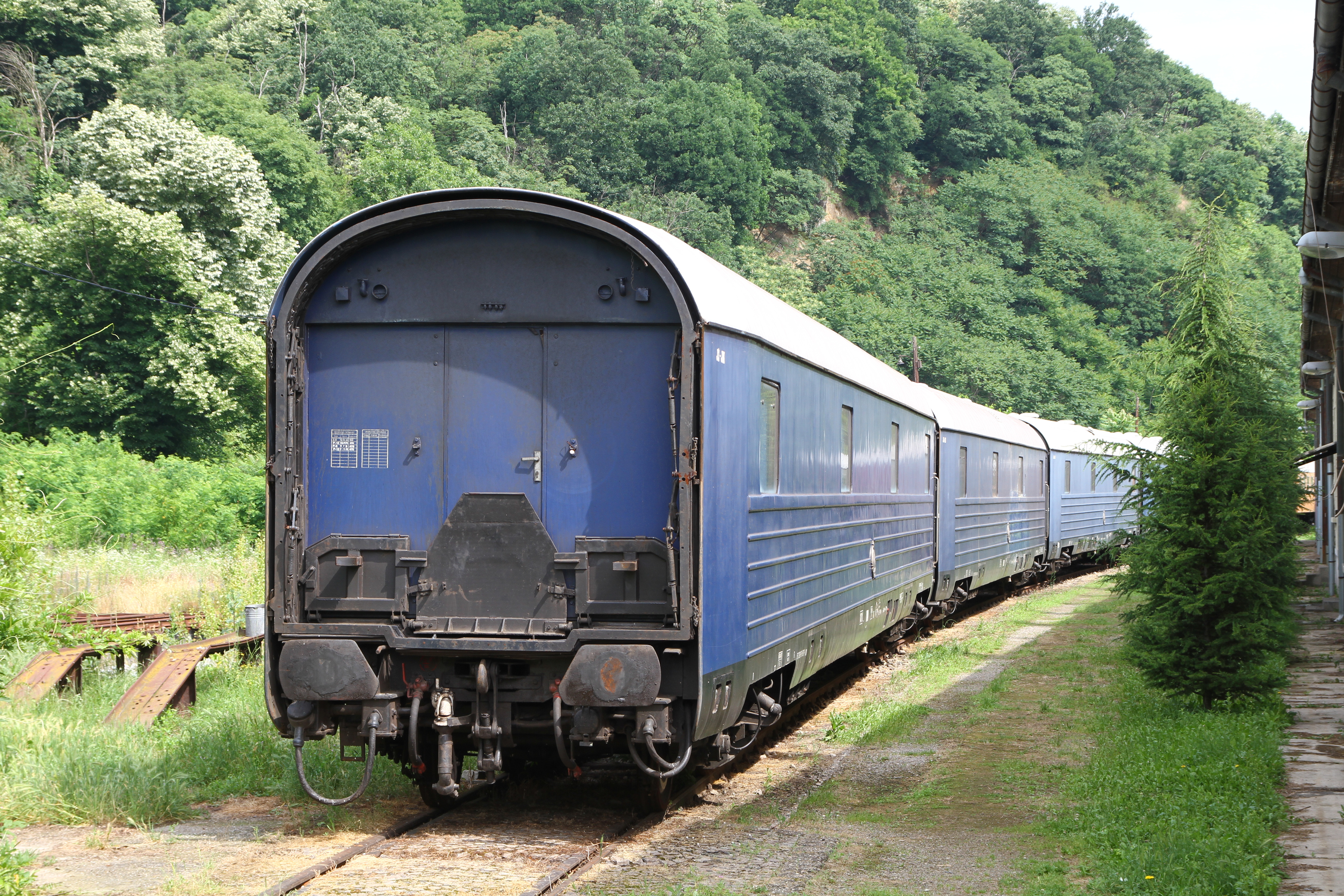
Units in storage at the Topčider depot in Belgrade

== See also ==
- Belgrade-Bar railway
- JŽ class 11
- JŽ D66/761s (DB Class V 200 based engines) of Tito's Blue Train.
- JŽ 666 (EMD JT22CW-2)
- Rail transport in Montenegro
- Serbian Railways
- Presidential train (disambiguation)
