= Komarnica Dam =

Proposed dam in Montenegro

- Location within Montenegro
- Official name: Брана Комарница
- Country: Montenegro
- Coordinates: 43°0′54.28″N 18°56′25.56″E
- Purpose: Power
- Status: Proposed; suspended construction
- Owners: Elektroprivreda Crne Gore: 51% Elektroprivreda Srbije: 49% (initially)
- Operator: Elektroprivreda Crne Gore

Dam and spillways
- Type of dam: Arch dam
- Impounds: Komarnica river
- Height (foundation): 171 m (561 ft)
- Length: 211.4 m (694 ft)
- Width (crest): 5 m (16 ft)
- Dam volume: not finalized

Reservoir
- Creates: Komarnica Lake

Power Station
- Type: Conventional
- Annual generation: 213 GWh

The Komarnica Dam (Montenegrin: Брана Комарница, Brana Komarnica) is a proposed concrete arch dam in the canyon of the Komarnica river in Montenegro.

The dam would create the Komarnica Lake, which would be the 5th largest reservoir in Montenegro behind the Slansko Lake as of reservoir size projections. The dam would be connected to the Mratinje Dam by the same river (essentially, as the Komarnica and Piva rivers are connected), laying around 45 km downstream in the Piva river, essentially reusing the already used water for power.

The dam is set to be completed by around 2032, although this number is unguaranteed due to the amount of delays there has been with the construction of the dam.

== Controversy ==
The dam's construction has been delayed multiple times by various environmental groups along with the EIA (Environmental Impact Assessment) due to its potential to threaten endangered and protected species such as wolves, bears, Balkan chamois, otters, stone crayfish, golden eagles, rock partridges, and corncrakes living in the canyon and reducing the biodiversity of the Komarnica and the Dragišnica national park. Officially, the dam project also violates Article 4(7) of the EU Water Framework Directive, possibly hindering the accession of Montenegro to EU membership.

Other critics also say the dam has a lack of justification, due to Montenegro already having an unstable electricity supply due to extreme seasonality with hydropower plants, with it sometimes being a net exporter of electricity due to the seasonal abundance of electricity while also being heavily reliant on imports during winters. One of the other critical arguments is also one arguing that upkeeping a seasonal power plant is a waste of time, money, and other resources, wanting more stable power sources such as coal.

== See also ==
- List of power stations in Montenegro
- Hydroelectric power stations in Montenegro
- Mratinje Dam
