= Lazar Sočica =

Military commander & political leader

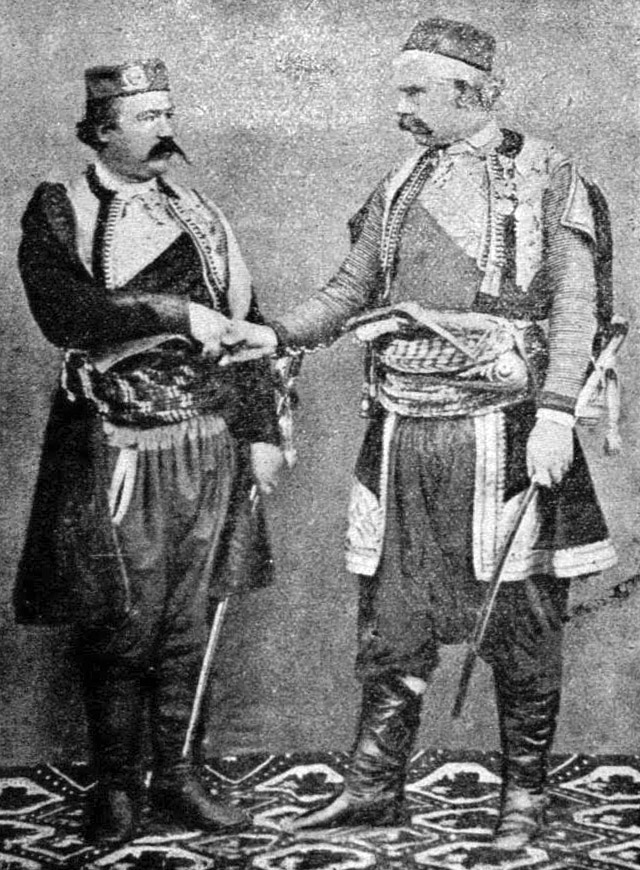
Lazar Sočica and Kuči chieftain Marko Miljanov shaking hands.

Lazar Sočica (Serbian Cyrillic: Лазар Сочица; 1838 – 1910) was Piva chieftain, Montenegrin vojvoda, military commander and political leader, from the Old Herzegovina region.

Lazar's father Risto died in 1848, and his mother then remarried to vojvoda Šćepan Lješević in Drobnjaci clan. Lazar's uncle, Abbot Teodosije, then took Lazar as an orphan and accepted him into the Piva Monastery with the intention of teaching him literacy. From the age of 14, he took part in all the main battles against the Turks, starting in 1850s. During the battles between 1858 and 1862, Lazar met the Montenegrin Prince Danilo in Cetinje. Later, he opened the first stores in his hometown of Plužine, procured goods from coastal and Gacko traders, also organizing the export of cattle. He soon became the richest man and chieftain in Piva region, which enabled him to be independent in his military activities, even from Prince Nikola I, who proclaimed him vojvoda. Lazar Sočica was one of the most prominent leaders of the Herzegovinian uprising of 1875–77. When the area of Piva officially belonged to Montenegro by the decision of the Berlin Congress in 1878, Lazar Sočica remained the most influential military and political figure in the region.

Sočica was also one of the founders of People's Party (1906), the first political party in Montenegrin history. When the first Constitution of Montenegro was proclaimed in 1905, Lazar, along with the Montenegrin political and military elite, supported the democratization of Montenegro, opposing the absolutist rule of Prince Nikola I, for which he was suspected and prosecuted, and was even sentenced to prison by the Cetinje's Higher Court in 1908. Sočica fell ill during his imprisonment. He died in 1910 in his hometown of Plužine. He had 17 children, but most died during the wars, young-aged. His son Risto "Mujo" Sočica was also an influential political figure and the Ban of the Zeta banovina during the Kingdom of Yugoslavia.
