= Komarnica =

Komarnica is a geographic name that may refer to:

- Komarnica (river), in northern Montenegro
- Komarnica dam, a proposed dam in Montenegro
- Komarnica, Cerkvenjak, a village near Cerkvenjak, northeastern Slovenia
- Komarnica, Šavnik, a village near Šavnik, central Montenegro
- Komarnica, Croatia, a village near Staro Petrovo Selo, eastern Croatia
- Komarnica Ludbreška, a village near Sveti Đurđ, northern Croatia
