= Kecojević =

Kecojević (Serbian Cyrillic: Кецојевић) is a Serbian and Montenegrin surname. It is the name of a brotherhood in Piva, Montenegro, which has origin in the Ivanišević brotherhood from Stari Vlah. The slava of the family is St. John the Baptist (Jovanjdan).

- Ivan Kecojević, Montenegrin footballer
- Simo Kecojević, Montenegrin Serbian revolutionary
- Sćepan Kecojević, Montenegrin Serbian revolutionary
- Nenad Kecojević, Serbian-Montenegrin footballer
- Branko Kecojević, Yugoslav footballer
- Ivan Kecojević (19th century), from Pirni Dol, was the tallest man (210 cm) in Montenegro.
