= Mujo Sočica =

Serbian politician

Risto Sočica
- Ристо Сочица
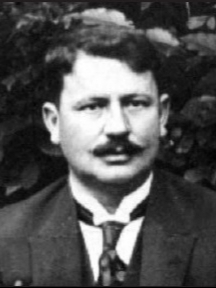

4th Ban of Zeta Banovina
- In office 23 April 1934 – 13 August 1936
- Monarchs: Alexander I Peter I
- Regent: Paul
- Preceded by: Aleksa Stanišić
- Succeeded by: Petar Ivanišević

Personal details
- Born: Plužine, Principality of Montenegro
- Party: Yugoslav Radical Union
- Parent: Lazar Sočica
- Occupation: Lawyer, senator, politician and military
- Nickname: Mujo L. Sočica

Military service
- Allegiance: Kingdom of Montenegro
- Branch/service: (Kingdom of Montenegro) Montenegrin Army
- Years of service: 1913
- Battles/wars: Battle of Bregalnica

Risto Sočica (Serbian Cyrillic: Ристо Сочица), better known as Mujo L. Sočica (Serbian Cyrillic: Мујо Л. Сочица) was a Montenegrin and Serbian politician and lawyer, from the Old Herzegovina region. He is the son of the Lazar Sočica, notable Montenegrin vojvoda and the chieftain of the Piva clan.

In the Second Balkan War, Risto Sočica, leading a battalion from Piva region, took part in a significant battle of Bregalnica as part of the Montenegrin division, in 1913, which was the largest battle of the war. After the Podgorica Assembly in 1918 and the unification of Montenegro with Kingdom of Serbia, Mujo Socica was appointed as the head of the Nikšić district of the newly formed province of Montenegro (later Zeta), within the Kingdom of Serbs, Croats and Slovenes. In 1932 he was elected senator of Kingdom of Yugoslavia. Between 1934 and 1936, Mujo Sočica served as Ban of Zeta.
