= List of power stations in Montenegro =

This article lists all power stations in Montenegro.

== Coal ==
Station	Town	Coordinates	Capacity (MW)	Years
Pljevlja Power Station	Pljevlja	43°20′2.3″N 19°19′37″E	225	1982-

== Hydroelectric ==
Station	Town	Coordinates	Capacity (MW)	Years
Mratinje Dam	Plužine	43°16′20″N 18°50′33″E	360	1975-
Perućica Power Station	Nikšić	42°40′18″N 18°59′43″E	307	1960-

== Wind power ==
Station	Municipality	Coordinates	Capacity (MW)	Years	Ref
Krnovo Wind Farm	Nikšić	42°53′02″N 19°05′49″E	72	2017-	
Možura Wind Farm	Bar−Ulcinj	41°59′32″N 19°10′11″E	46	2019-	
Gvozd Wind Farm	Nikšić	42°52′N 19°15′E	54	2025-	

== Solar power ==
Station	Municipality	Coordinates	Capacity (MW)	Years	Ref
Rooftop solar systems (distributed generation)	Various	-	~50+ (cumulative)	2020s–present	
Briska Gora Solar Park (planned)	Ulcinj	41°58′N 19°12′E	250–300	Planned	
Krupac Floating Solar Project (proposed)	Nikšić	42°44′N 18°59′E	40	Feasibility study	

== See also ==
- List of power stations in Europe
- List of largest power stations in the world
- Elektroprivreda Crne Gore
