= Plužine Municipality =

Plužine Municipality Opština Plužine Општина Плужине
- Municipality
- Flag Coat of arms

- Plužine Municipality in Montenegro
- Country: Montenegro
- Seat: Plužine

Area
  - Total: 854 km^{2} (330 sq mi)

Population (2023)
  - Total: 2,177
  - Density: 2.55/km^{2} (6.60/sq mi)
- Postal code: 81435
- Area code: +382 40
- ISO 3166 code: ME-15
- Car plates: PŽ
- Climate: Cfb
- Website: www.pluzine.me

Plužine Municipality (Serbian Cyrillic: Opština Plužine / Општина Плужине) is one of the municipalities in Northern Montenegro. The administrative center is the town of Plužine. According to the 2023 census, it has a population of 2,177.

== Geography and location ==
The municipality of Plužine is the seventh largest municipality in Montenegro, but also the municipality with the lowest population density, after the Šavnik Municipality. The municipality is located in the northwest of Montenegro, being part of the Piva region, named after the Piva river. The region is close to the border with Bosnia and Herzegovina (more precisely, the Herzegovina region), with crossings through the towns of Gacko and Foča.

=== City Assembly (2022–2026) ===
| Party | Seats | Local government |
|---|---|---|
| SNP | 17 / 30 | Government |
| ZBCG (NSD) | 6 / 30 | Opposition |
| DCG | 4 / 30 | Opposition |
| DPS | 2 / 30 | Opposition |

== Demographics ==
The town of Plužine is the administrative centre of the Plužine municipality, which in 2011 had a population of 3,235. The town of Plužine itself had 1,341 residents.

Historical population
| Year | Pop. | ±% p.a. |
|---|---|---|
| 1948 | 8,030 | — |
| 1953 | 8,952 | +2.20% |
| 1961 | 9,164 | +0.29% |
| 1971 | 9,078 | −0.09% |
| 1981 | 6,254 | −3.66% |
| 1991 | 5,247 | −1.74% |
| 2003 | 4,295 | −1.65% |
| 2011 | 3,246 | −3.44% |
| 2023 | 2,177 | −3.27% |

Ethnic groups (1991 census):

- Montenegrins (91.61%)
- Serbs (6.63%)

Ethnic groups (2003 census):

- Serbs (63.92%)
- Montenegrins (29.79%)

Ethnic groups (2011 census):

- Serbs (60.78%)
- Montenegrins (31.77%)

== Gallery ==
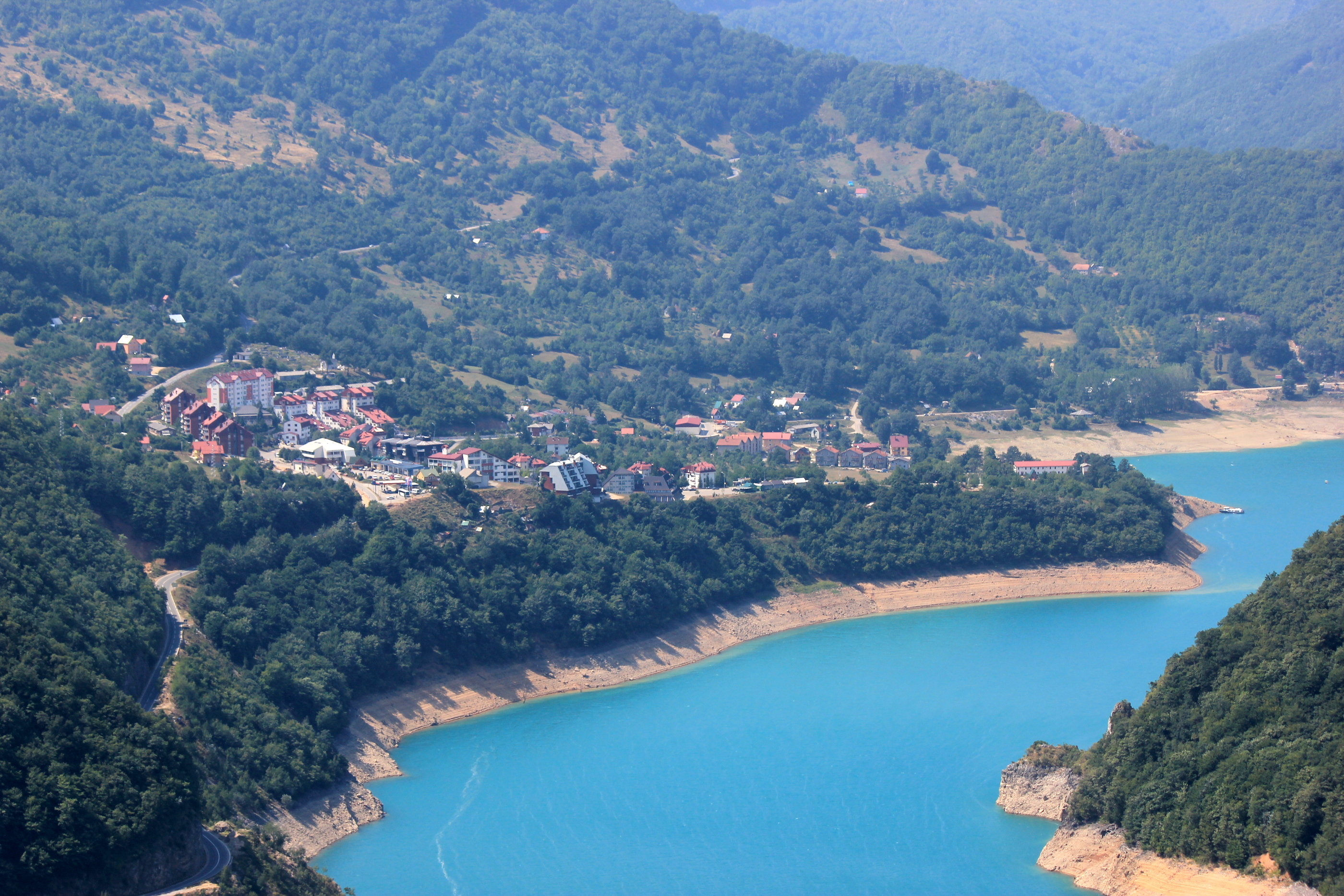
Town of Plužine

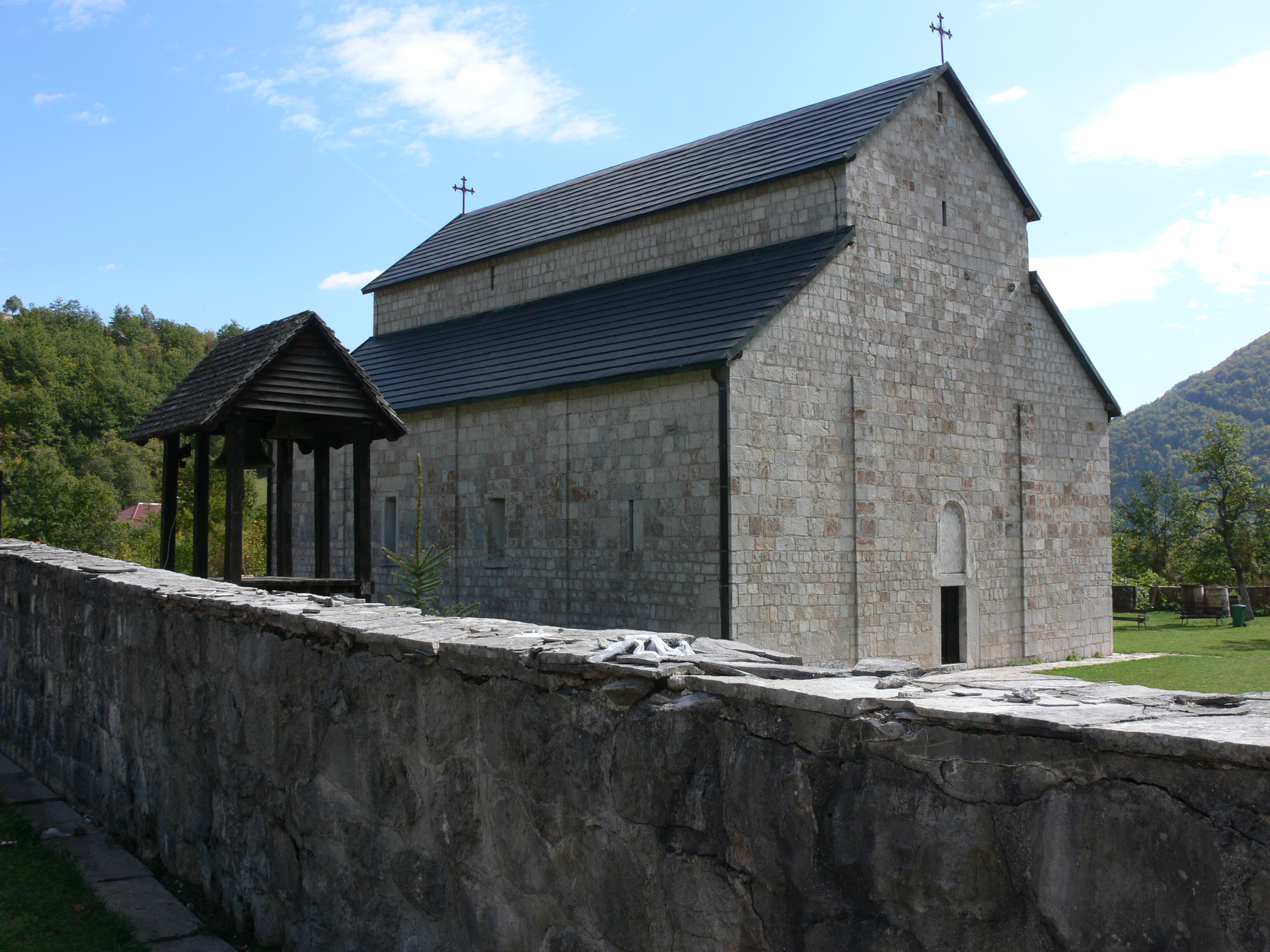
Piva Monastery

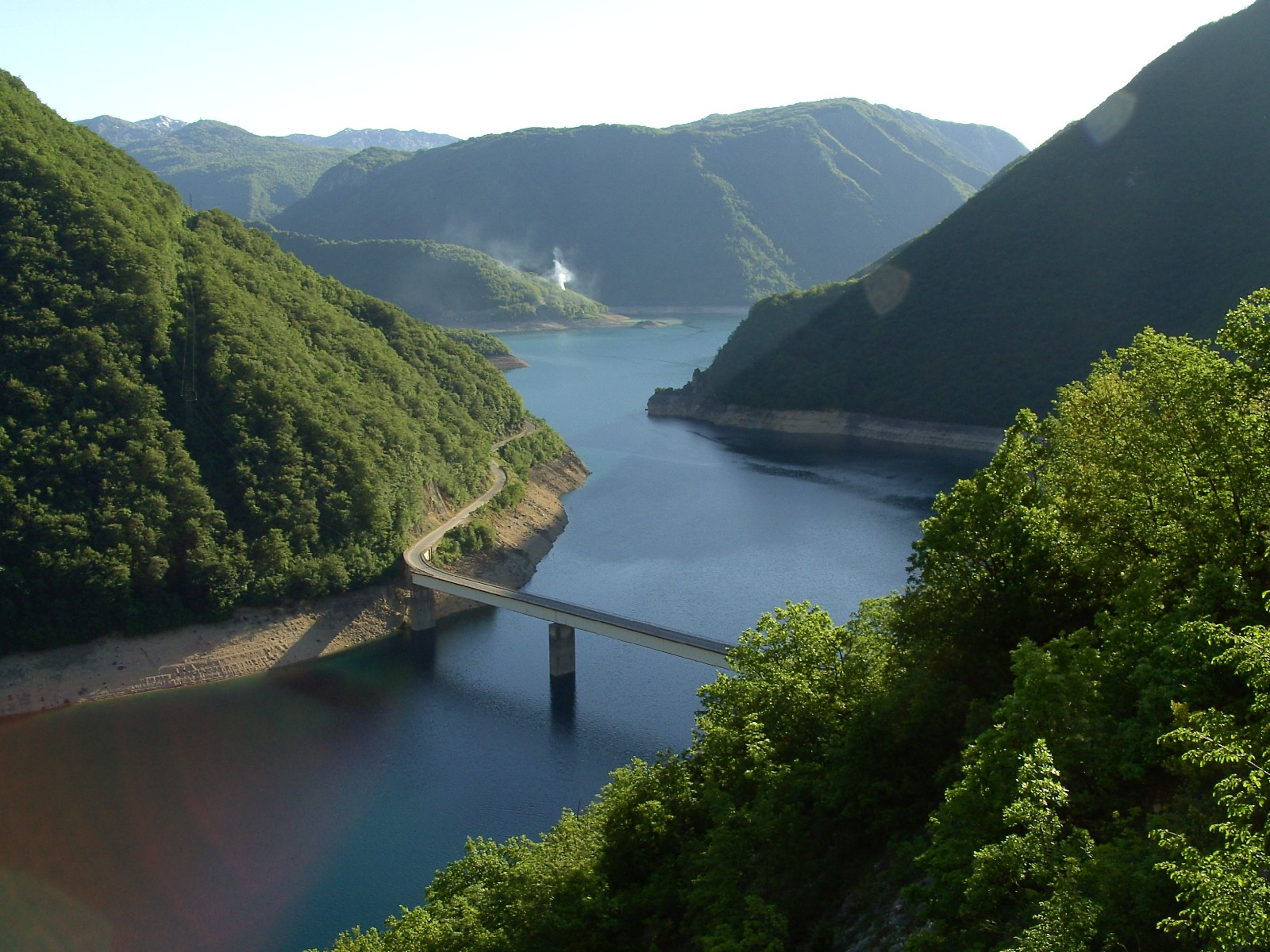
Piva River

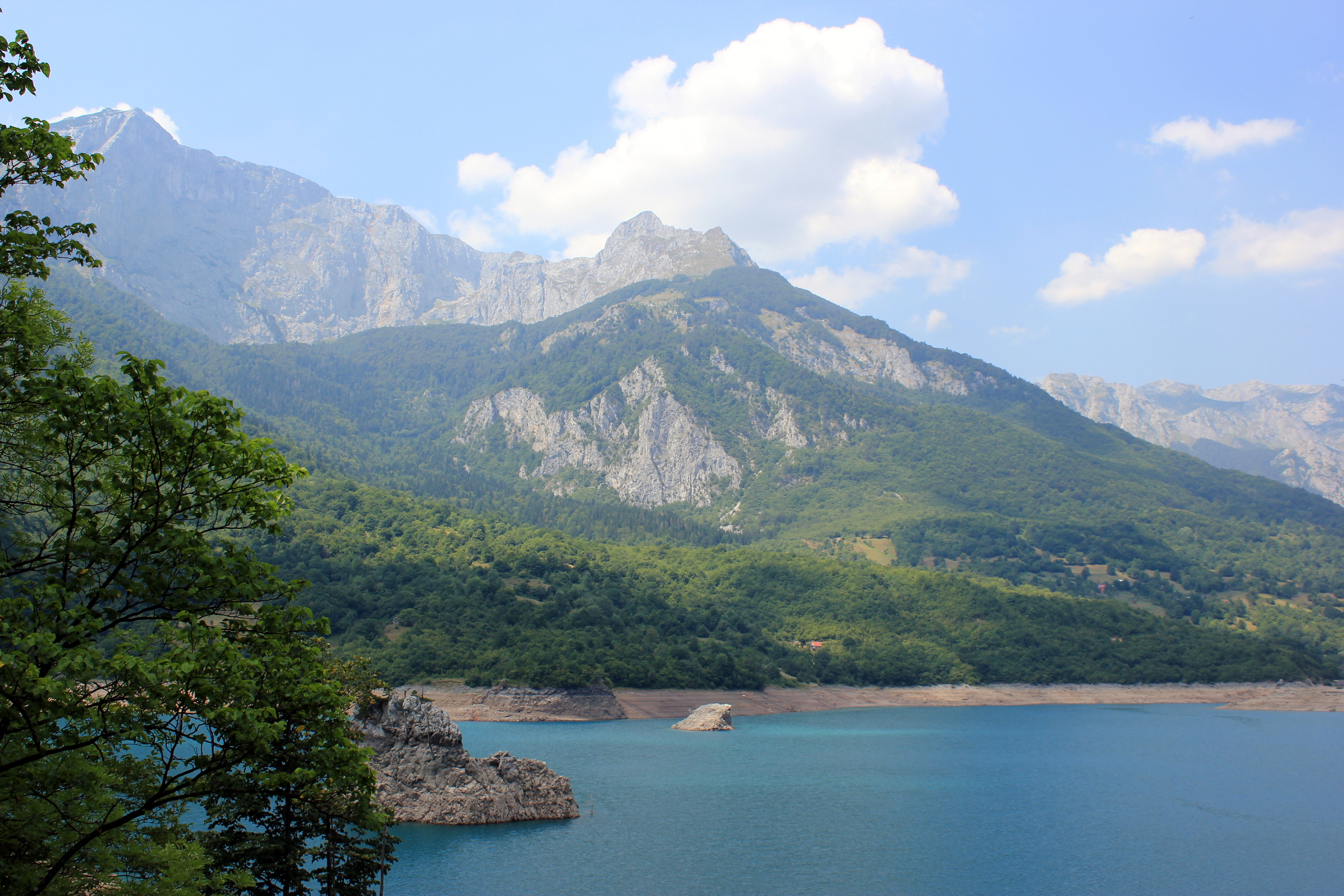
Piva Mountain and Lake

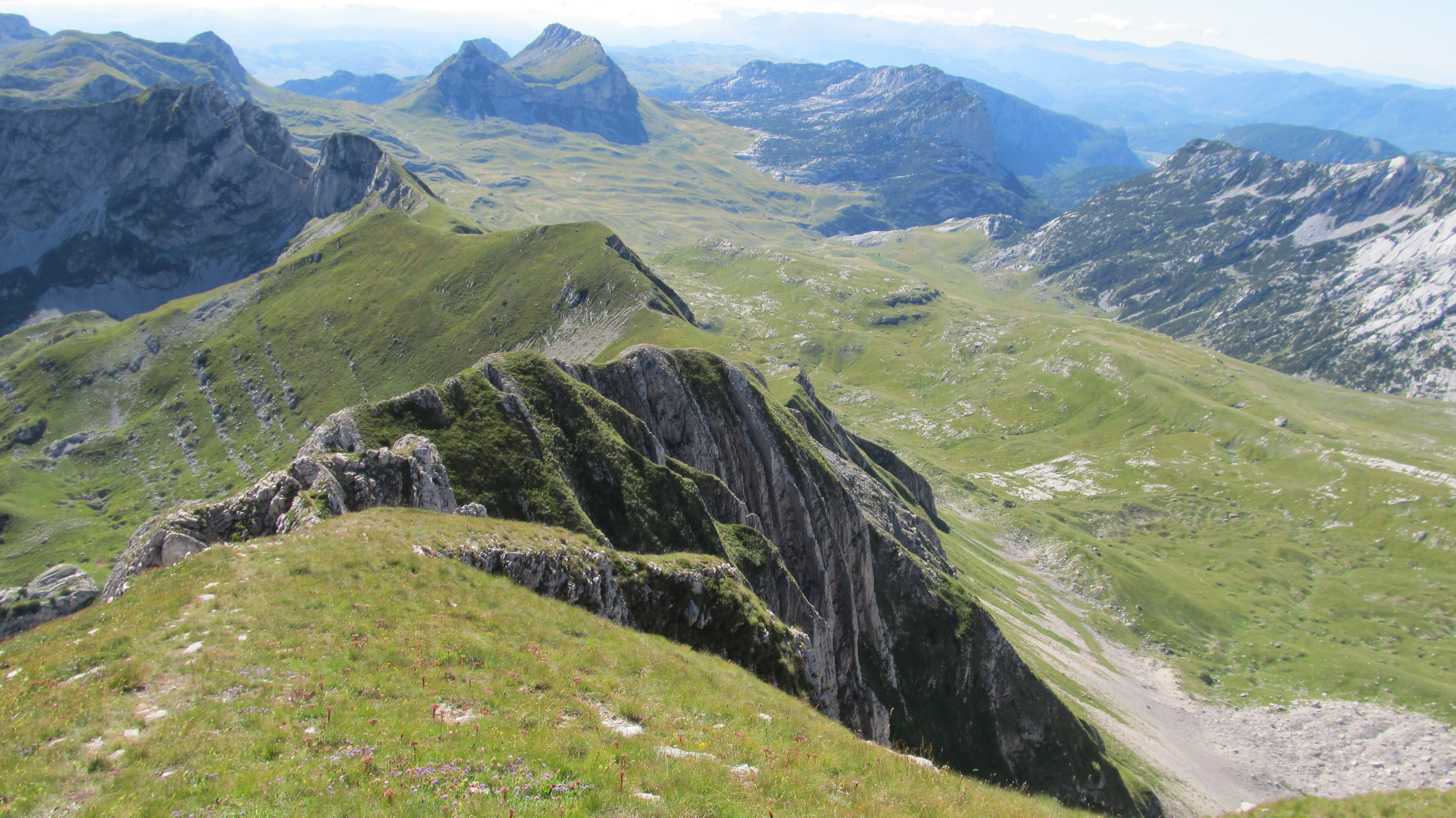
Prutaš, Durmitor

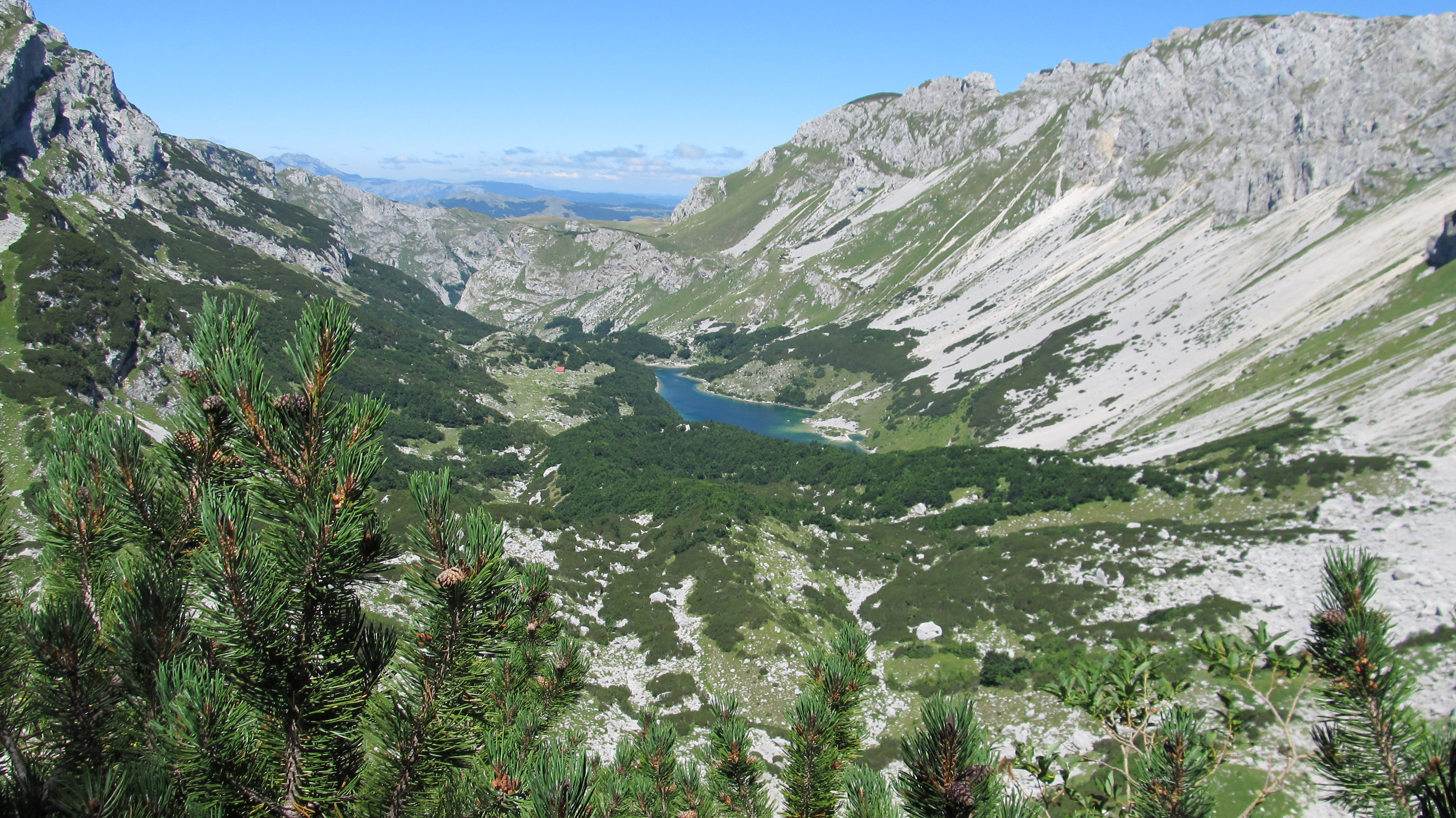
Durmitor massif

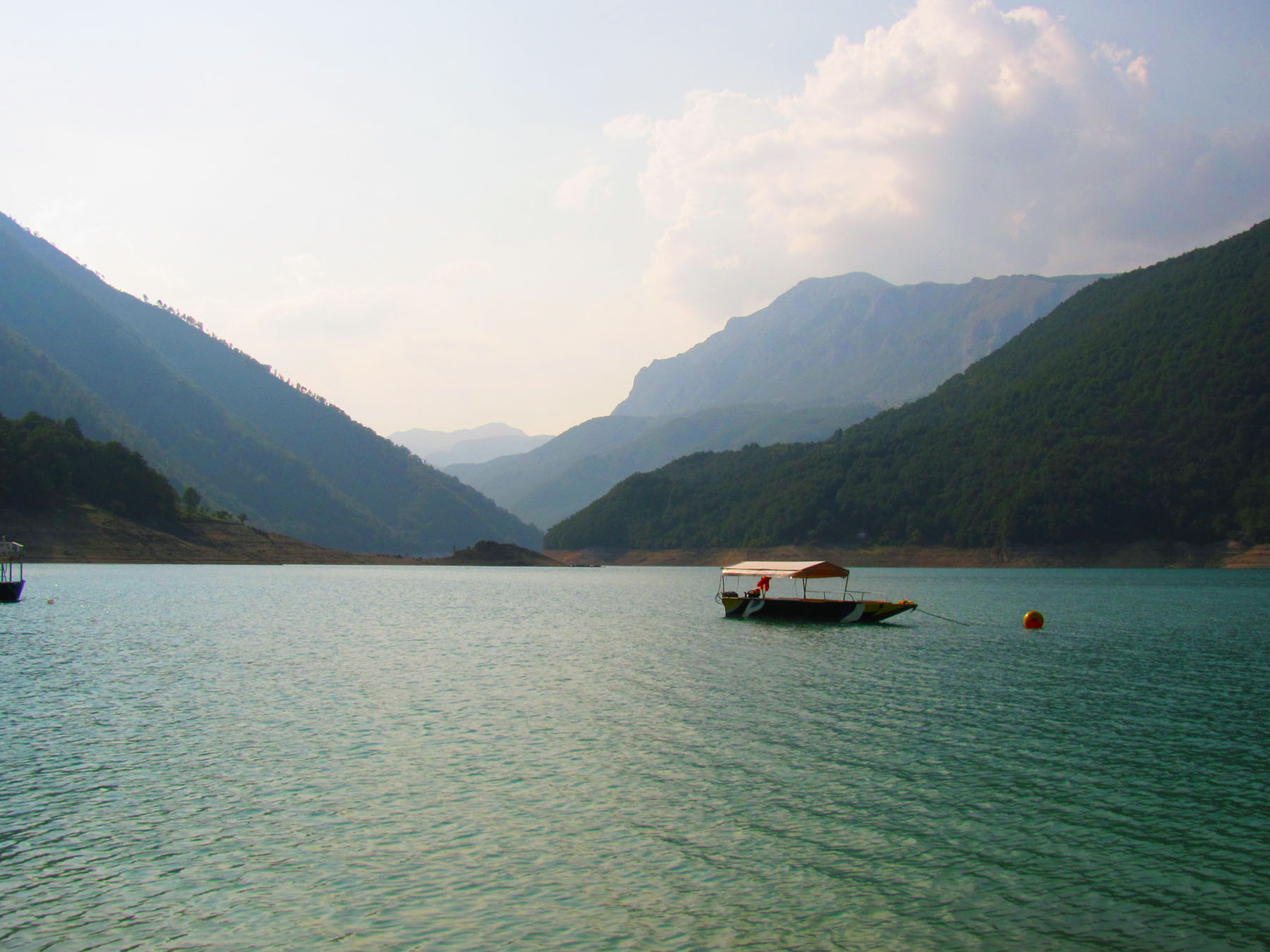
Piva lake near Plužine

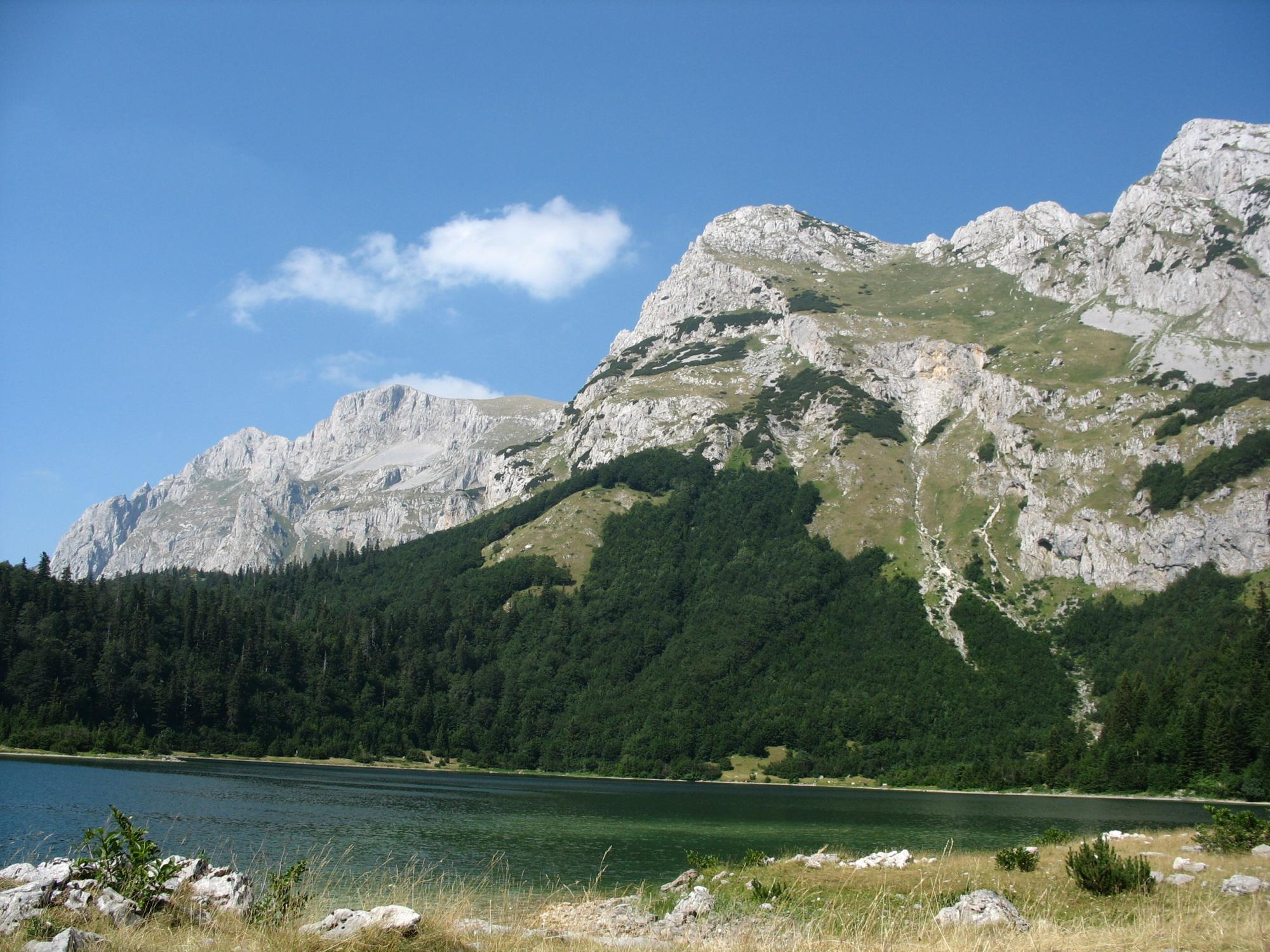
Trnovac lake, Maglić
