= Pljevlja Power Station =

Coal-fired power plant in Montenegro

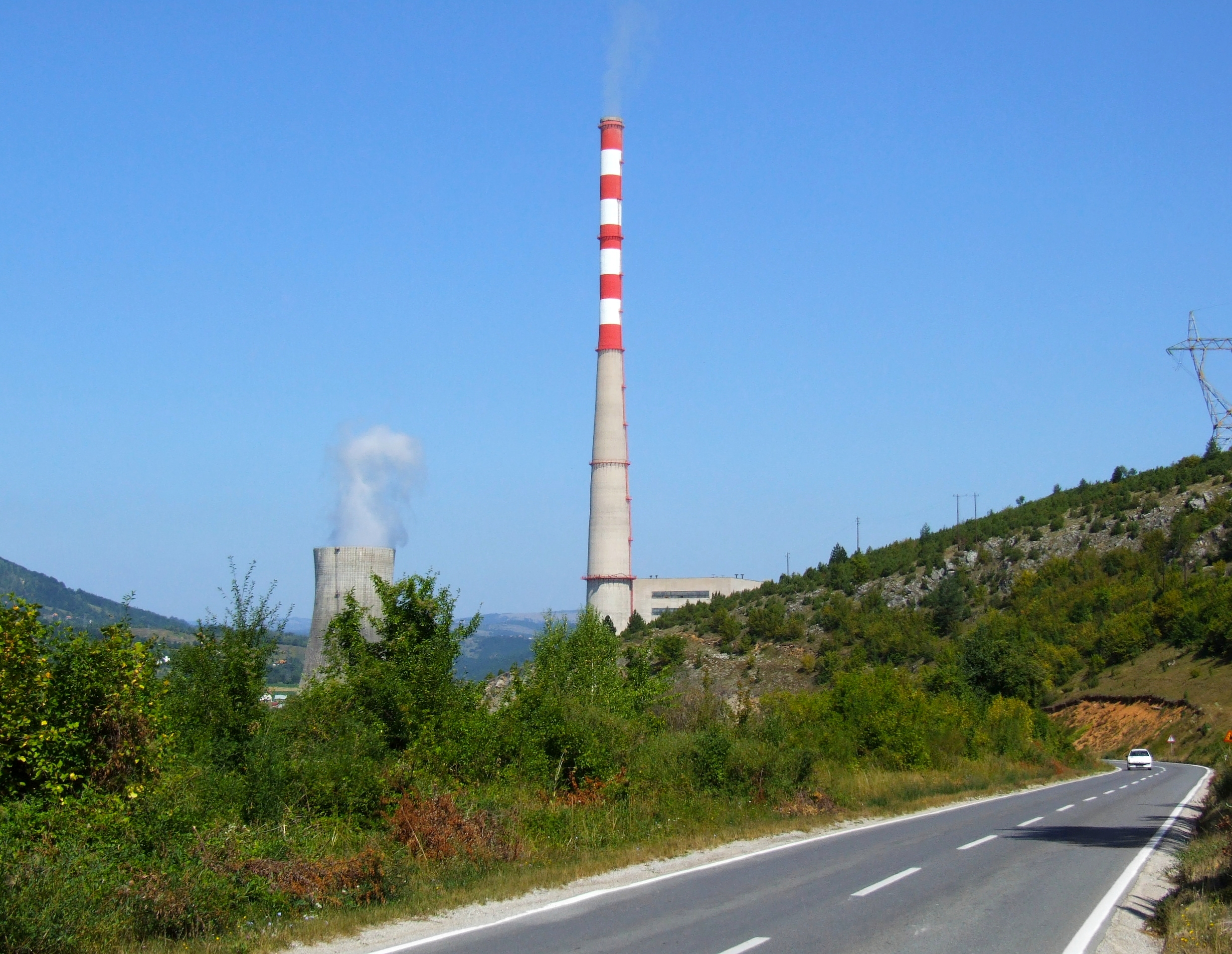
- View on Pljevlja Power Station, August 2012
- Official name: Pljevlja Power Station
- Country: Montenegro
- Location: Pljevlja
- Coordinates: 43°20′02″N 19°19′37″E
- Status: Operational
- Commission date: 21 October 1982; 44 years ago
- Owner: Elektroprivreda Crne Gore
- Operator: Elektroprivreda Crne Gore

Thermal power station
- Primary fuel: Coal

Power generation
- Units operational: 1
- Nameplate capacity: 225 MW (2024)
- Annual net output: 1,338 GWh (2024)

External links
- Commons: Related media on Commons

Pljevlja Power Station is a coal-fired power station located near Pljevlja, Montenegro. It is owned and operated by the Elektroprivreda Crne Gore. With generation capacity of 225 MW, it generates around 1,338 GWh annually (as of 2024), which covers 41.9% of Montenegro's electricity needs.

The plant went into service in 1982 and is the only coal-fired power station in Montenegro. The chimney of the power plant is 250 meters tall.

The majority of fuel is supplied from two surface mines located within the Pljevlja coal mine and operated by "Rudnik uglja a.d. Pljevlja". The older mine is Potrlica, where mining began in 1952. A newer mine, Sumani I, supplies lesser-quality lignite coal. The power plant's water cooling source is the accumulation of Otilovići situated on river Ćehotina some 8 kilometres (5.0 mi) from the power plant, and connected to it by the asphalt road.

== History ==
Pljevlja Power Station began operation in 1982, with the first synchronization of the network carried out on 21 October 1982. It was the first Montenegrin condensing power plant designed with two units of 210 MW. Accumulations as well as all ancillary, technical and administrative management facilities (except for decarbonization and recirculation cooling system) were designed for two blocks. However, only one block was built.

The power station burns coal produced in Pljevlja coal mine, which has a guaranteed calorific value of 9,211 kilojoules per kilogram (2,201 kcal/kg). In the first period, the coal was provided from Juniper coal mine. It was built on the altitude of 760 metres (2,490 ft). Since it started operating, it has produced 25.23984 TWh of electricity.

In 2009 and 2010 important projects were carried out related to environmental and technological stabilization of objects: replacement of electro filter system; replacement of control systems and management; replacement of divorce 6 and 0.4 kV auxiliary consumption; replacement of generator excitation system and the installation of the generator switch. These works increased the capacity of the plant from 210 MW to 225 MW.

== Ownership ==
The power plant is owned by Elektroprivreda Crne Gore, a state-owned electricity company of Montenegro. More than 99% of the ownership is held by Elektroprivreda Crne Gore, while less than 1% is owned by small shareholders.

== Expansion ==
There is a plan to build a second unit which will eventually replace the existing one. TEP - II is designed to use best available techniques (BAT), which include all the measure for reducing waste gas emissions, including the emissions of SO_{2}, NO_{x} and dust. Because of the higher energy efficiency, CO_{2} emissions will be lower than in the existing state. There is also the thermal station with maximum power of 75 MW which will provide thermal energy for district heating center, which will reduce air pollution from individual furnaces.

The investment is estimated to be €366 million. There is an ongoing procedure for the selection of a company which will construct it. Of nine companies which submitted preliminary offers, there are now three shortlisted – China's CMEC, Powerchina Hubei Electric Power Survey & Design Institute and Skoda Praha, a CEZ subsidiary from the Czech Republic.

=== Financing ===
In January 2018, more than a year after the withdrawal of the Czech Export Bank from financing the project, Skoda Praha did not find financing for the project, as it was obliged to do under the contract.

Elektroprivreda Crne Gore (EPCG) and the Government have emphasized their commitment to moving forward with the project and promised to make a proposal on an alternative solution for carrying out the project by the end of January 2018.

== Ecological reconstruction ==
The ongoing environmental reconstruction, led by Elektroprivreda Crne Gore (EPCG), represents the primary focus of investments in the energy sector. The main objective is to reduce emissions of sulfur oxides, nitrogen oxides, and particulate matter to levels below 200 mg/m³. These parameters are defined by the Large Combustion Plants Directive, and compliance with them is imperative for the survival of the thermal power plant on the European energy market and for avoiding sanctions from the Energy Community.

The installation of flue gas desulfurization (FGD) and denitrification systems is a key component of the project, which is valued at several tens of millions of euros. In addition to its environmental benefits, the reconstruction also includes the district heating of the city of Pljevlja. This system will enable the use of heat from the electricity generation process for district heating, leading to the shutdown of numerous individual heating units in the city that have for decades been the main cause of severe air pollution during the winter months.

== See also ==
- List of power stations in Montenegro
