= Lake Piva =

Lake in Montenegro

Lake Piva Pivsko jezero
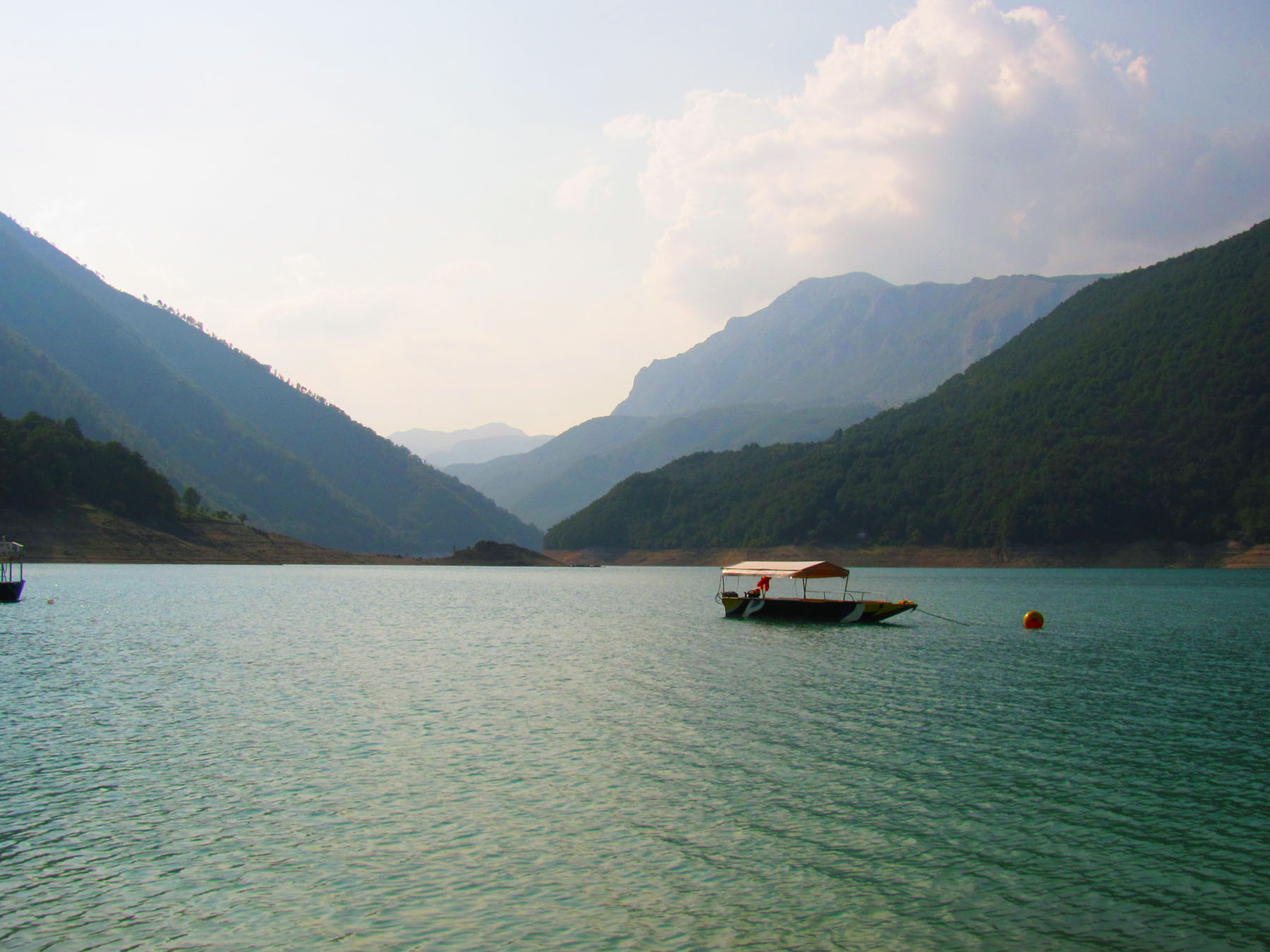

- Location within Montenegro
- Interactive map of Lake Piva; Pivsko jezero
- Location: Plužine Municipality
- Coordinates: 43.164°N 18.862°E
- Primary inflows: Piva
- Primary outflows: Piva
- Basin countries: Montenegro
- Max. length: 45 km (28 mi)
- Max. width: 0.7 km (0.43 mi)
- Surface area: 12.5 km^{2} (4.8 sq mi)
- Max. depth: 188 m (617 ft)
- Surface elevation: 675 m (2,215 ft)
- Settlements: Plužine

Lake Piva (Montenegrin: Пивско језеро, Pivsko jezero) is a reservoir in Montenegro. It is the largest lake entirely within the country, located in the northwest, in Plužine Municipality. The surface of the lake is 12.5 km², the length is 45 km, and the maximum depth is 188 m. The elevation is 675 m above sea level.

The artificial lake is the result of the construction of Mratinje Dam on the Piva River. On the bottom of the lake there is the old town Plužine; Piva Monastery was also there, but it has been relocated. The new location of the monastery is 8 km from Plužine, and 3.5 km away from the original location of the monastery. The relocation has started in 1969 and finished in 1982. The old confluence of the Komarnica into the Piva was submerged as well.
