= Goransko =

Goransko Горанско
- Town
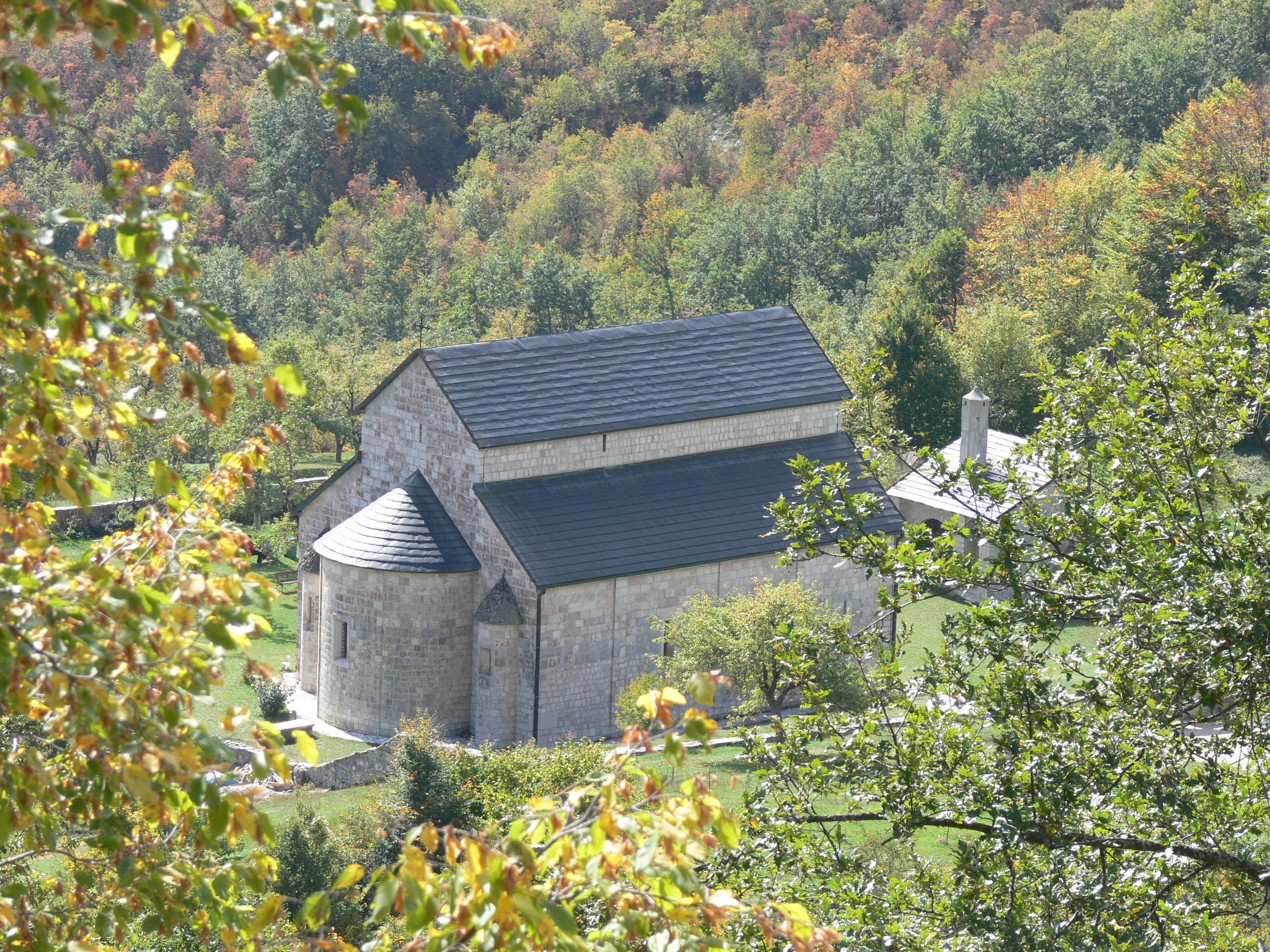
- Piva Monastery

- Location within Montenegro
- Coordinates: 43°07′10″N 18°49′49″E
- Country: Montenegro
- Municipality: Plužine

Population (2011)
  - Total: 272
- Time zone: UTC+1 (CET)
  - Summer (DST): UTC+2 (CEST)

Goransko (Montenegrin: Горанско) is a small town in the municipality of Plužine, Montenegro.

== Demographics ==
According to the 2003 census, the town has a population of 334 people. Piva Monastery was rebuilt here in 1982.

According to the 2011 census, its population was 272.

Ethnicity in 2011
Ethnicity	Number	Percentage
Serbs	183	67.3%
Montenegrins	81	29.8%
other/undeclared	8	2.9%
Total	272	100%
