= Simo Kecojević =

Serbian freedom fighter

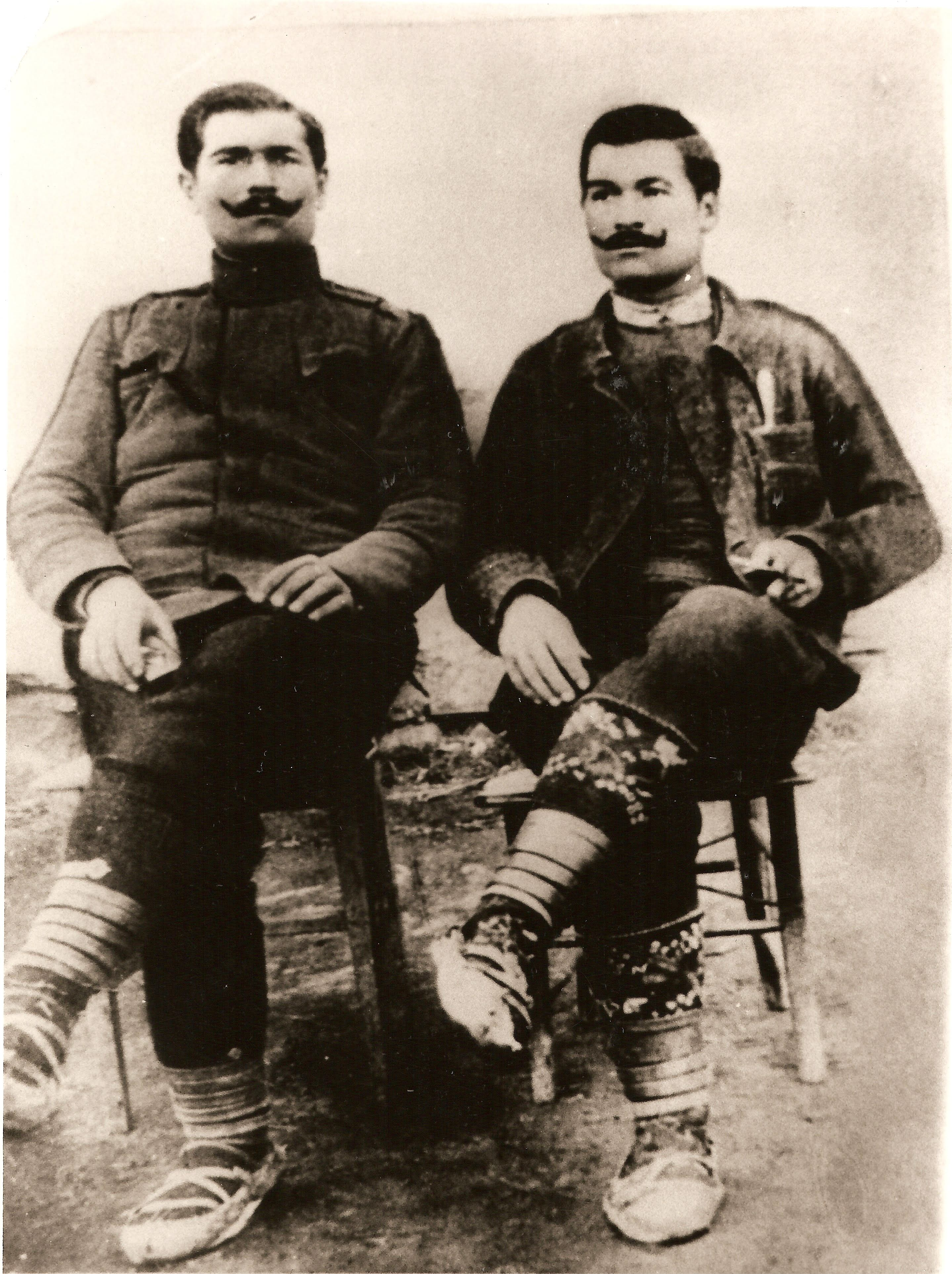
Twin brothers Sćepan (left) and Simo (right) Kecojević

Simo Kecojević (Serbian Cyrillic: Симо Кецојевић; 1888–1953) was a Serbian freedom fighter, having participated in the irregular guerrilla forces in the Kosovo Vilayet between 1910 and 1912, then as regular soldier in the Balkan Wars, World War I and World War II.

== Life ==
=== Early life ===
Simo Kecojević and his twin brother Sćepan were born in Boričje, Piva, Principality of Montenegro (in today's Plužine, Montenegro), in 1888, the sons of Milovan Kecojević and Cvijeta (née Živković). The family moved to the Kingdom of Serbia in 1895.

=== Balkan Wars and World War I (1910–1918) ===
Kecojević was actively involved in all wars that Serbia (and later Yugoslavia) waged from 1910 to 1945. Between 1910 and 1912, he and his twin brother Sćepan participated in the irregular guerrilla forces in the Kosovo Vilayet which sought to join the region with Serbia. Simo, under the nom de guerre Simče Kecalov, was appointed the vojvoda (commander, "duke") of Prizren (today in Kosovo), while his brother was appointed vojvoda of Prilep (today in Republic of Macedonia).

During the First Balkan War (1912–1913), the brothers served as infantry in the Morava Division (nicknamed "The Iron Regiment"), under lieutenant-colonel Vlada Ristić.

Serbian general Radomir Putnik personally awarded Simo with the Bravery Medal for his action in combat during World War I. The brothers were also well-known leaders of the Toplica Rebellion (1917). His brother Sćepan was killed by Bulgarians in Varna while escaping from prison in 1917.

=== Between the world wars ===
Between the wars, Kecojević worked as a farmer and was an active member of the Democratic Party.

=== World War II and retirement ===
During World War II, Kecojević was initially a vojvoda of the Chetniks in southern Serbia until late 1941, after a disagreement with Kosta Pećanac, when he joined the Yugoslav Partisans and served as a commander of a battalion in Gajtan.

Kecojević died in 1953 in Srpski Miletić, Serbia.

== See also ==
- List of Chetnik voivodes
