= Otilovići =

Otilovići Отиловићи
- Village
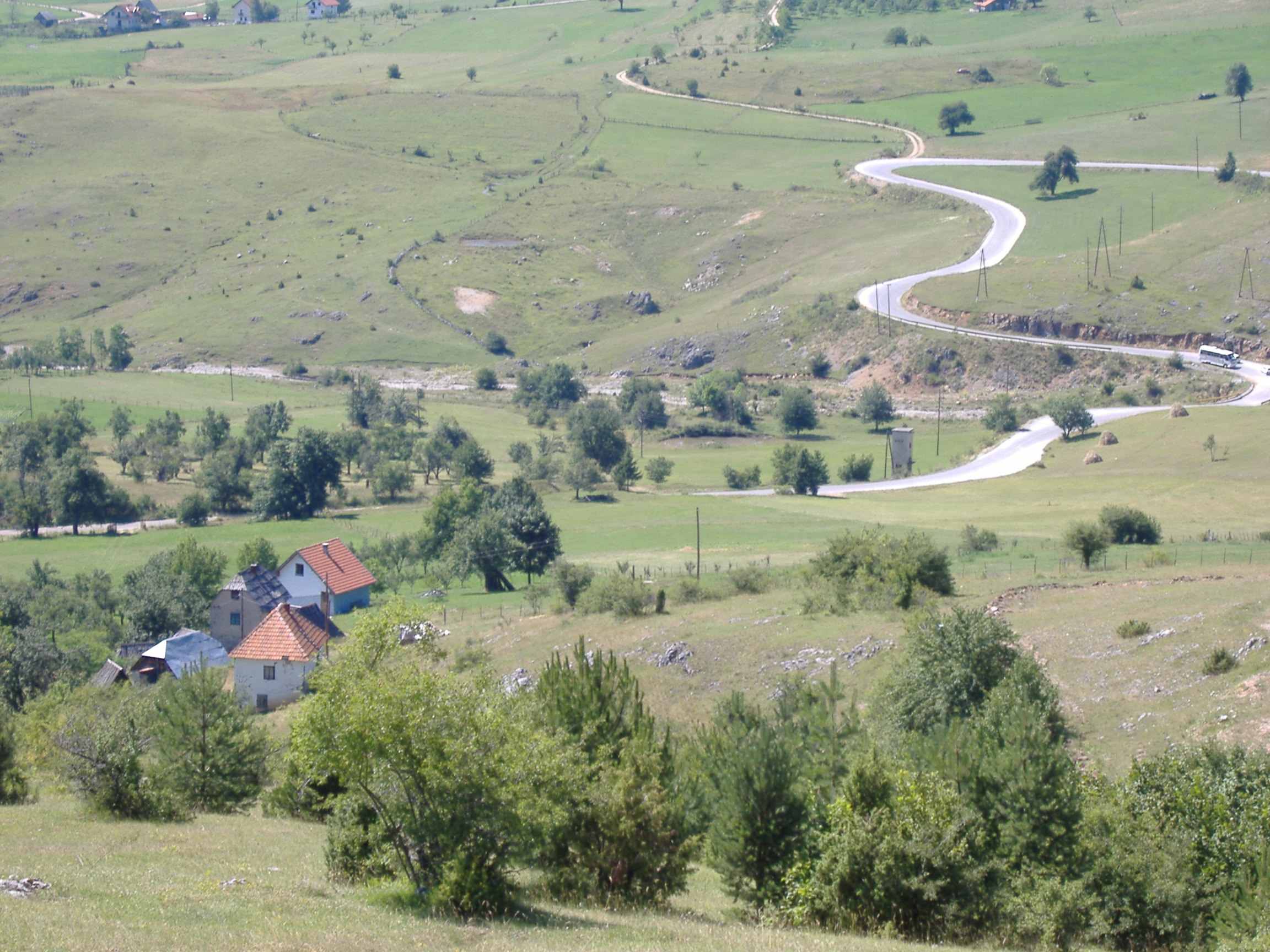
- View on Otilovići, July 2006

- Location within Montenegro
- Country: Montenegro
- Region: Northern
- Municipality: Pljevlja

Population (2011)
  - Total: 245
- Time zone: UTC+1 (CET)
  - Summer (DST): UTC+2 (CEST)

Otilovići (Montenegrin Cyrillic: Отиловићи) is a village in the municipality of Pljevlja, Montenegro.

== Demographics ==
According to the 2003 census, the village had a population of 233 people.

According to the 2011 census, its population was 245.

Ethnicity in 2011
Ethnicity	Number	Percentage
Serbs	154	62.9%
Montenegrins	70	28.6%
other/undeclared	21	8.6%
Total	245	100%

== Reservoir ==
On the territory of Otilovići, there is a reservoir created by the damming of river Ćehotina, for the purpose of providing the water cooling source to the thermal power plant TPP Pljevlja. The reservoir is located some 8 kilometres (5.0 mi) from the power plant and is connected by the asphalt road.
