= Strahinja of Budimlje =

Strahinja of Budimlje (c. 1555-after 1620) was a Serbian priest and icon and fresco painter of the Byzantine style who lived and worked in the mid-sixteenth and early seventeenth century.

Strahinja of Budimlje is known by the work he did in the Piva Monastery, Đurđevi stupovi, Church of St. Nicholas, Brezova (1619-1620), Gradište Monastery, Morača Monastery, Reževići Monastery, Monastery of the Holy Trinity of Pljevlja (1595) and other monasteries and churches. He was a prolific painter whose Byzantine style had Western influence.
