= Pljevlja coal mine =

Open-pit coal mine in Montenegro

- Rudnik uglja Pljevlja
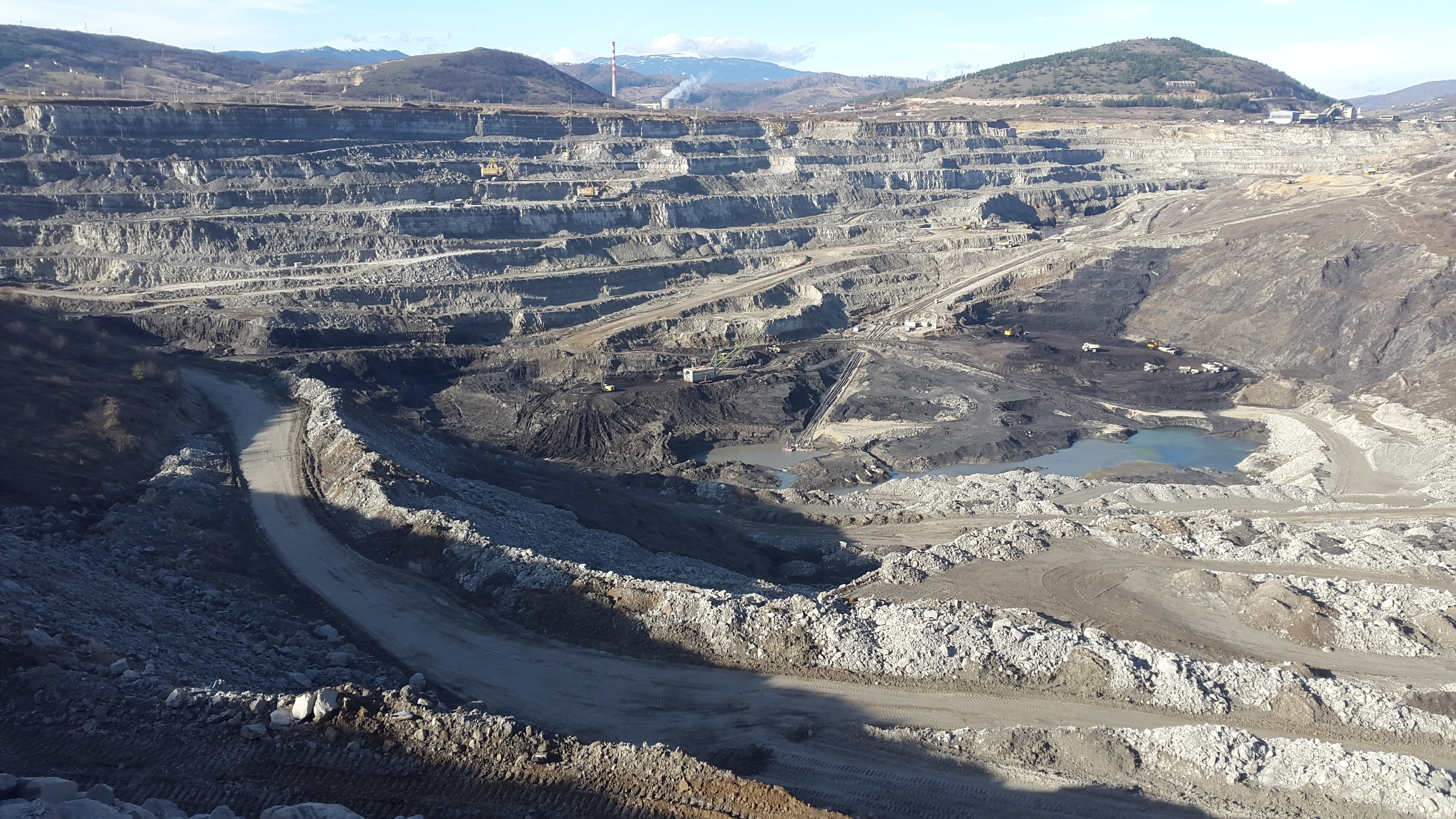
- View on Potrlica open-pit mine site, February 2016

- Location within Montenegro
- Location: Pljevlja, Montenegro; 43°20′24″N 19°22′20″E
- Products: Coal mining
- Production: 1.62 million tonnes of coal (2024)
- Opened: 1952; 74 years ago
- Company: Elektroprivreda Crne Gore
- Website: www.rupv.me

Pljevlja coal mine is an open-pit coal mining complex operated by Elektroprivreda Crne Gore. It is located near the town of Pljevlja, Montenegro. As of 2024, it produced 1.62 million tonnes of coal. The most of its mined coal is used for the electricity production at Pljevlja Power Station.

== History ==
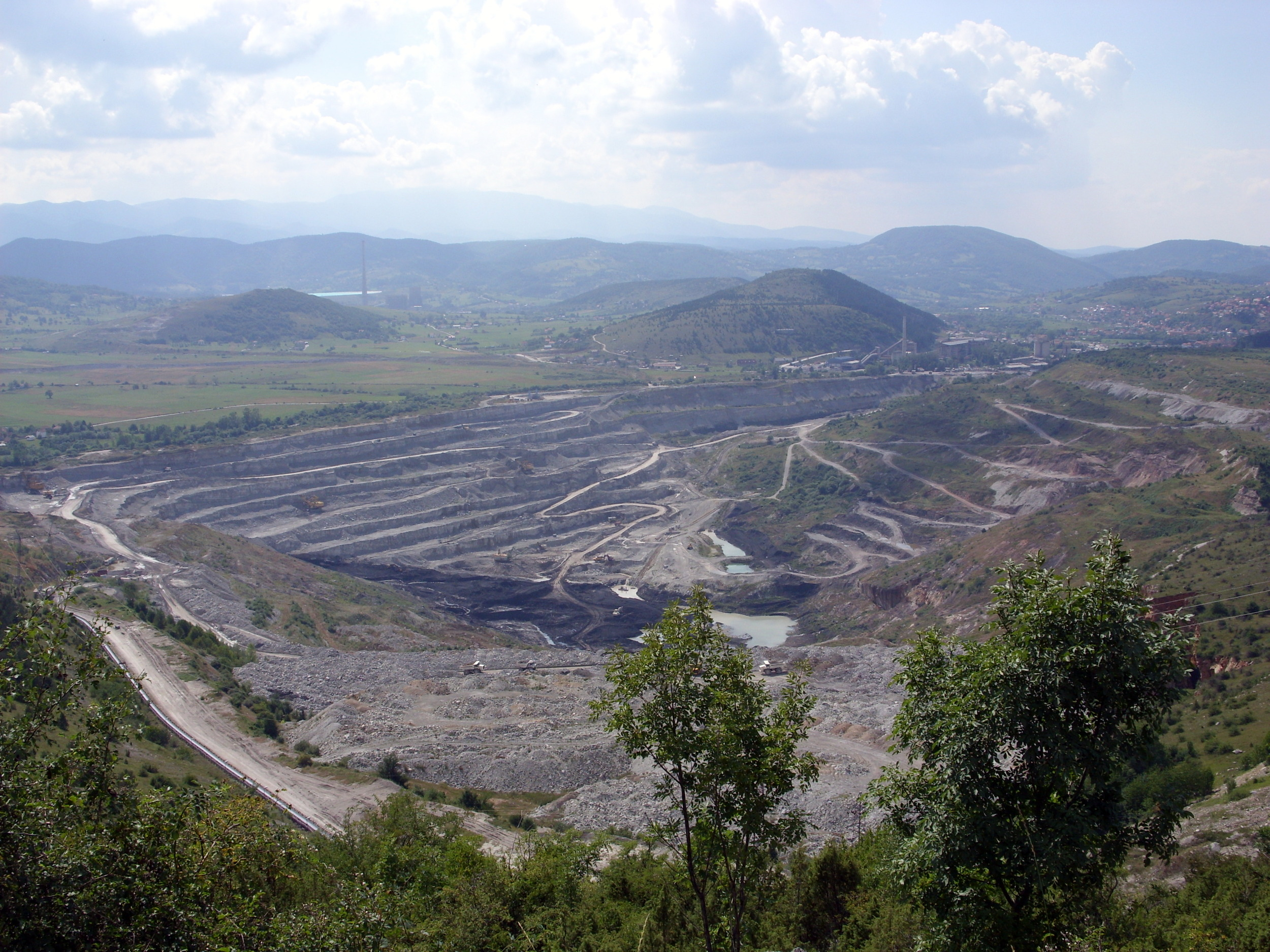
Aerial view on Pljevlja coal mine, July 2008

The first significant coal production in Pljevlja began in 1952, when the District People's Committee established the Enterprise for Coal Exploration and Production, which is the precursor to today's Pljevlja coal mine. That year, a total of 37 employees extracted 16,200 tons of coal. Between 1954 and 1964, the mine made substantial investments in modernization, including the construction of a coal separation plant in Potrlica with an annual capacity of 400,000 tons. The highest annual production level was reached in 1985, with an output of 2.7 million tons of lignite.

From 1972, the mine operated as a "working organization" comprising five "basic organizations of associated labor," and, following the establishment of "Borovica", a total of six of these, along with two "working communities". From 1990, it operated as a "socially-owned enterprise," subsequently evolving into the socially-owned enterprise "Coal Mine Pljevlja," and later becoming a "public enterprise" with full liability, headquartered in Pljevlja. As part of the ownership transformation on 18 October 1999, the coal mine began operating as a joint-stock company.

From 1952 until the end of 2012, a total of 62.7 million tonnes of coal was produced and sold. Of this amount, 36.7 million tonnes were supplied to the Pljevlja Power Station, while 26 million tonnes were delivered to the broader regional market - including industrial and municipal thermal power plants and heating plants, the industrial sector, and general consumer use (which, for a certain period, also included significant quantities for the TPP Morava, located in Serbia), as well as for local general consumption.

== Ownership ==
The mine is owned and operated by "Rudnik Uglja a.d. Pljevlja", which is 100% owned by Elektroprivreda Crne Gore.
