= Potrlica =

- Village
- Location within Montenegro
- Country: Montenegro
- Municipality: Pljevlja

Population (2011)
  - Total: 22
- Time zone: UTC+1 (CET)
  - Summer (DST): UTC+2 (CEST)

Potrlica (Serbian Cyrillic: Потрлица) is a small village in the municipality of Pljevlja, Montenegro. An opet-pit mine of the Pljevlja coal mine is located on the territory of the village.

== Demographics ==
According to the 2003 census, the village had a population of 27 people.

According to the 2011 census, its population was 22.

Ethnicity in 2011
Ethnicity	Number	Percentage
Serbs	12	54.5%
Montenegrins	7	31.8%
other/undeclared	3	13.6%
Total	22	100%
