= Piva (tribe) =

Piva (Serbian Cyrillic: Пива, pronounced [pîʋa]) is a historical region in Montenegro, which existed as a Montenegrin tribe also known as Pivljani (Пивљани, pronounced [pîʋʎaːni]). It is situated in the northwestern highlands of Montenegro, bordering Bosnia and Herzegovina. The Piva River flows through the region. The regional center is the town of Plužine.

== History ==
=== Ottoman period ===
Piva was a nahiya of the Ottoman Empire, mentioned in the 1476–78 defter. It was earlier mentioned in the Chronicle of the Priest of Duklja (c. 1300–10) as one of ten counties in the province of Podgorje, and in the St. Stephen Chrysobull of Serbian king Stefan Milutin (r. 1282–1321). It was part of Sanjak of Herzegovina during Ottoman rule.

The Serbian Orthodox Piva Monastery has stood in Piva since the 16th century. It has produced four Patriarchs of the Serbian Orthodox Church.

=== Modern ===
Under Prince Nicholas I of Montenegro and the Congress of Berlin recognition, in 1878 the Piva together with the Serb Herzegovinian tribes of Banjani, Nikšići, Šaranci, Drobnjaci and a large number of the Rudinjani formed the Old Herzegovina region of the new Montenegrin state.

During the Second World War, people of the region fought in both the Serbian royalist Chetnik and communist Partisan resistance movements, which fought against each other.

The tribe has since the arrest of Radovan Karadžić, the wartime Bosnian Serb president and member of the neighbourly Drobnjak tribe of Petnjica (from which the Serbian language reformer Vuk Karadžić also descends), petitioned for Tadić's excommunication from the tribe because of Karadžić's arrest. The arrest is seen as directly bad behavior against the Serbian people and from the Piva against the Drobnjak tribe, who had never before had any problems, and it is because of this Tadić's actions have been condemned.

== Notable people ==
- Bajo Pivljanin (d. 1685), Venetian guerilla leader, born in Piva
- Stojan Čupić (1765–1815), Serbian revolutionary, born in Piva
- Arsenije Loma (1778-1815), one of the leaders of the First Serbian Uprising
- Simo and Sćepan Kecojević, soldiers, born in Boričje, Plužine
- Radoman Božović, Prime Minister of Serbia 1991–93, born in Šipačno, Plužine
- Patriarch Makarije Sokolović
- Patriarch Savatije Sokolović
- Lazar Sočica, Military commander
- Patriarch Gerasim
