= Elektroprivreda Crne Gore =

Elektroprivreda Crne Gore AD
- Type: State-owned enterprise
- Traded as: MNSE: EPCG
- Industry: Electricity
- Founded: 1910
- Headquarters: Nikšić, Montenegro
- Area served: Montenegro
- Key people: Zdravko Dragaš (CEO)
- Products: Electric power production
- Services: Sale of electric power
- Revenue: 240,057,791€
- Operating income: 22,156,935 euro (2019)
- Net income: 21,928,832 €
- Total assets: 1,224,472,319 €
- Owner: Government of Montenegro (88.66%)
- Number of employees: 1,031
- Website: www.epcg.com

Elektroprivreda Crne Gore AD is an integrated electricity company located in Niksić, Montenegro. The company is listed at Montenegro Stock Exchange with majority of shares owned by the government. Rest of the shares are traded at the Montenegro Stock Exchange.

The company's operations engage electricity generation, distribution and supply. In March 2009, the transmission system was split from the company, forming the separate transmission system operator company, Crnogorski Elektroprenosni Sistem.

Elektroprivreda Crne Gore owns two large and seven small hydroelectric power plants, and one coal-fired thermal plant. The Perućica hydroelectric power plant as a capacity of 307 MW and the Piva hydroelectric power plant has a capacity of 342 MW. The Pljevlja Thermal Plant has a capacity of 210 MW. A 100 MW solar plant is under construction, and a floating solar plant is planned for the Slano artificial salt lake.

== History ==
The electrification of Montenegro began in the first decade of the 20th century. The debt tradition has begun for almost a century after only 28 years since the construction of the world's first electric power plant, which was built by famous American inventor T. A. Edison in New York. With that, Montenegro was ranked in the line, at that time, of rare European and world countries whose towns were illuminated by electricity.

Everything started on August 19, 1910, when, in connection with the crowning of Nikola I Petrović, in Cetinje, the first electric power station in Montenegro was put into operation. In today's context, it was a mini power plant, with two diesel engines, power of 110 kW. Over the years, power has doubled to 220 kW. The power plant served to illuminate Cetinje Royal Palace, Zetski dom, the main street of the city, and several houses of the more prominent Montenegrins. It has become the basis for the development of one of the most important economic entities in Montenegro, Elektroprivreda Crne Gore. The power plant worked for 50 years, 450,000 hours continuously - 12 years without malfunction. It was erected and equipped, then, by the renowned firm Emanuel Kraus from Trieste. The building and facilities of the "Montenegrin Electric Company", as originally called the Cetinje power plant, are preserved and, because of their exceptional importance, they were placed under the protection of the Law as a cultural monument, in order to be transformed into the EPCG museum on November 13, 1976, with a proposal to grow in the Technical Museum of Montenegro. The date of commissioning of the electric power station, August 19, is celebrated as the day EPCG AD Niksic.

Shortly after the commissioning of the Cetinje mini-power plant, other power plants started to open in Montenegro, and other towns and citizens in Montenegro started to enjoy the advantages of electricity brought by them - Bar in 1913, Kotor in 1916, Herceg Novi in 1925, Podgorica and Niksic in 1927, Risan in 1928, Kolasin in 1929, Ulcinj in 1930, Zelenika in 1935, Perast in 1936, in Pljevlja in 1937, in Tivat in 1939 and so in a row.

== Hydroelectric ==
By the construction of hydroelectric power plants, which are now called small or distribution, the first and the second phase of the development of the electric power system of Montenegro has been completed. Again, Cetinje was the first. In its vicinity was built, in 1937, HE "Podgor" power 250 kW, which still generates electricity. After it was built: "Rijeka Mušović" in 1950, a power of 1.36 MW (1360 kW), "Waterfall of the Zeta" in 1952, a power of 1.2 MW and a yearly production of 6000 GWh, "Rijeka Crnojevića", also in 1952. 754 kW (only 160 kW) and "Head of the Zeta" (1955) with a power of 4.5 MW, which is the only one underground. From the small hydroelectric power plants today there are also "Left Rijeka" and "Savnik", and the total power of small HPPs is 8.5 MW.

The third stage of development begins with the construction of a large HPP "Perućica", which was commissioned in the first phase of its construction in 1960. By completing its second and third phases, Montenegro made significant surpluses of electricity. Sixteen years later, Mratinje Dam was built, with the highest dam in the Balkans, that is, one of the highest in Europe (220 m).

== Thermal power plant ==
Commissioned in 1982, Pljevlja Power Station was designed as the first unit of a broader development plan that was never fully implemented. The generator has a capacity of 225 MW, and the facility uses lignite supplied from the nearby coal mine. Over the decades, the power station has undergone several phases of revitalization aimed at maintaining operational reliability and improving boiler efficiency under changing market conditions.

== Electric network ==
In addition to the production facilities, Elektroprivreda Crne Gore has built a significant electrical network of various voltage levels with transmission lines, substations and other facilities, as well as a diluted distribution network in all populated areas of Montenegro. The distribution and transmission network followed the development and improvement of production facilities.

== Wind power ==
In June 2023 EPCG obtained €82m finance to build the Gvozd wind farm which will generate 54.6 MW.

== See also ==
- List of power stations in Montenegro
