= Komarnica (river) =

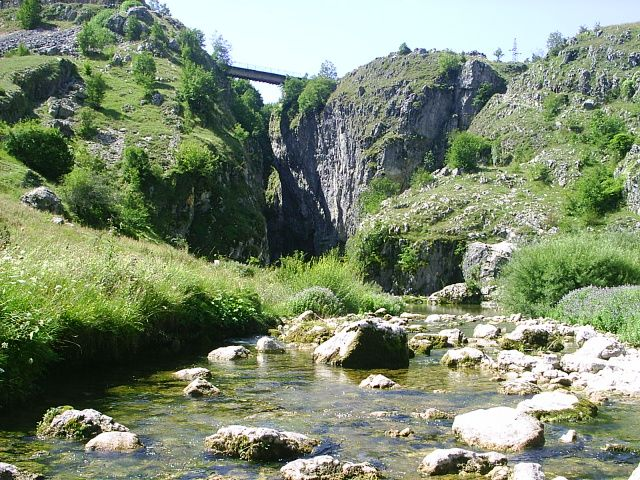

Location
- Country: Montenegro

Physical characteristics
- Mouth: Lake Piva
  - coordinates: 43°06′26″N 18°50′52″E

Komarnica (Cyrillic: Комарница) is a river in northern Montenegro.

The river canyon is one of the 32 Emerald sites nominated by the country in 2011 under the Bern Convention. Parts of the canyon are protected as a nature park Dragišnica and Komarnica nature park.

It rises under Mount Durmitor and flows to the south, by the eponymous village of Komarnica. South of the village of Duži it receives the river Pridvorica from the left, which had arisen in nearby Šavnik from the confluence of a number of other rivers and streams, including the Bukovica, Šavnik and Bijela. Komarnica then turns to the northwest and flows into the Lake Piva, which drains into the river Piva.
