= Mratinje Dam =

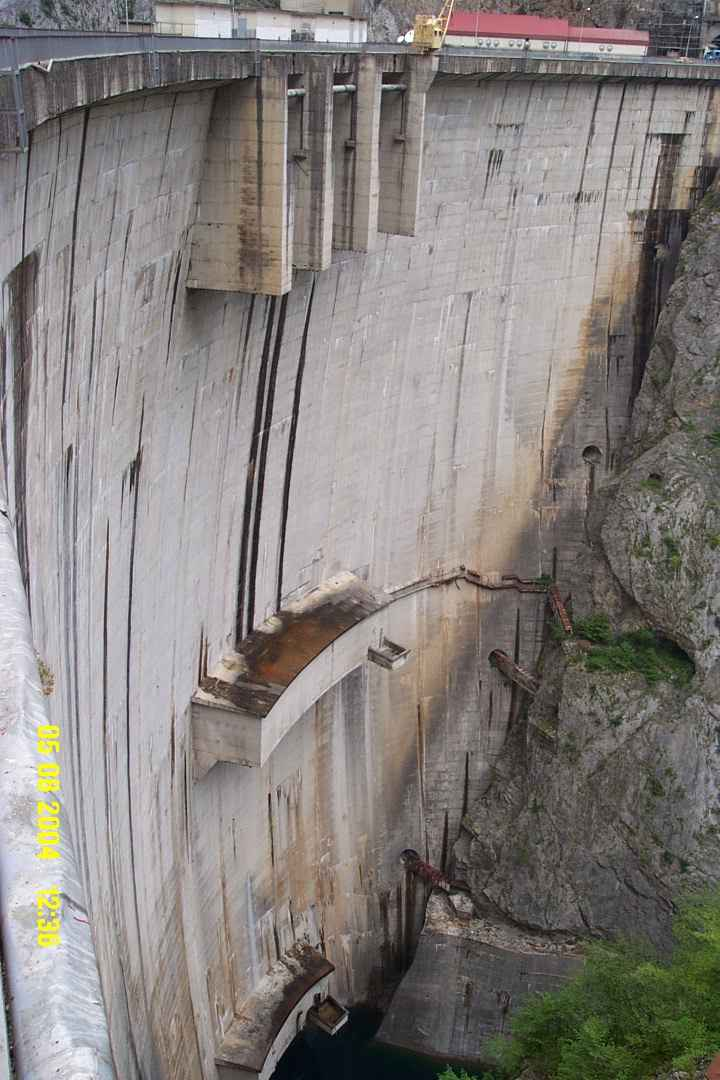

- Location within Montenegro
- Country: Montenegro
- Coordinates: 43°16′20″N 18°50′30″E
- Status: In use
- Construction began: 1971
- Opening date: 1976
- Owner: Elektroprivreda Crne Gore

Dam and spillways
- Type of dam: Arch, double-curvature
- Impounds: Piva River
- Height: 220 m (722 ft)
- Length: 268 m (879 ft)
- Width (crest): 4.5 m (15 ft)
- Width (base): 45 m (148 ft)
- Dam volume: 732,940 m^{3} (25,883,532 ft^{3})

Reservoir
- Creates: Piva Lake
- Total capacity: 880,000,000 m^{3} (710,000 acre⋅ft)
- Catchment area: 1,757.7 km^{2} (679 sq mi)
- Surface area: 12 km^{2} (5 sq mi)

Power Station
- Turbines: 3 x 120 MW
- Installed capacity: 360 MW

The Mratinje Dam (Montenegrin: Брана Мратиње, Brana Mratinje) is a concrete arch dam in the canyon of the Piva River in Montenegro.

The dam was completed in 1975 with designs by Energoprojekt. Its construction resulted in the flooding of the Piva Canyon and the creation of the Piva Lake, which, with its 12.5 km², is the second largest lake in Montenegro.

The dam is 220 metres (720 ft) high, one of the highest in Europe. The dam is 268 metres (879 ft) long and 4.5 metres (15 ft) thick at the crest, while it is 30 metres (98 ft) long and 36 metres (118 ft) thick at the base. The foundations go as deep as 38 metres (125 ft) into the ground. 820,000 cubic metres (1,070,000 yd^{3}) of concrete and 5,000 tonnes of steel were built into the dam.

The hydroelectric power station at Mratinje is capable of producing 860 gigawatt-hours per annum. It has three turbines and generators, each with a generation capacity of 120 MW. The associated Piva Hydroelectric Power Station has an installed capacity of 342 MW and operates as a peak-load facility.

The location of the 16th century Piva Monastery was flooded by the lake, so while the dam was built, the monastery was broken into pieces and moved to a higher ground, 3.5 km away. It was reconstructed in the original way.
