= Piva Monastery =

Serbian Orthodox monastery near Plužine, Montenegro

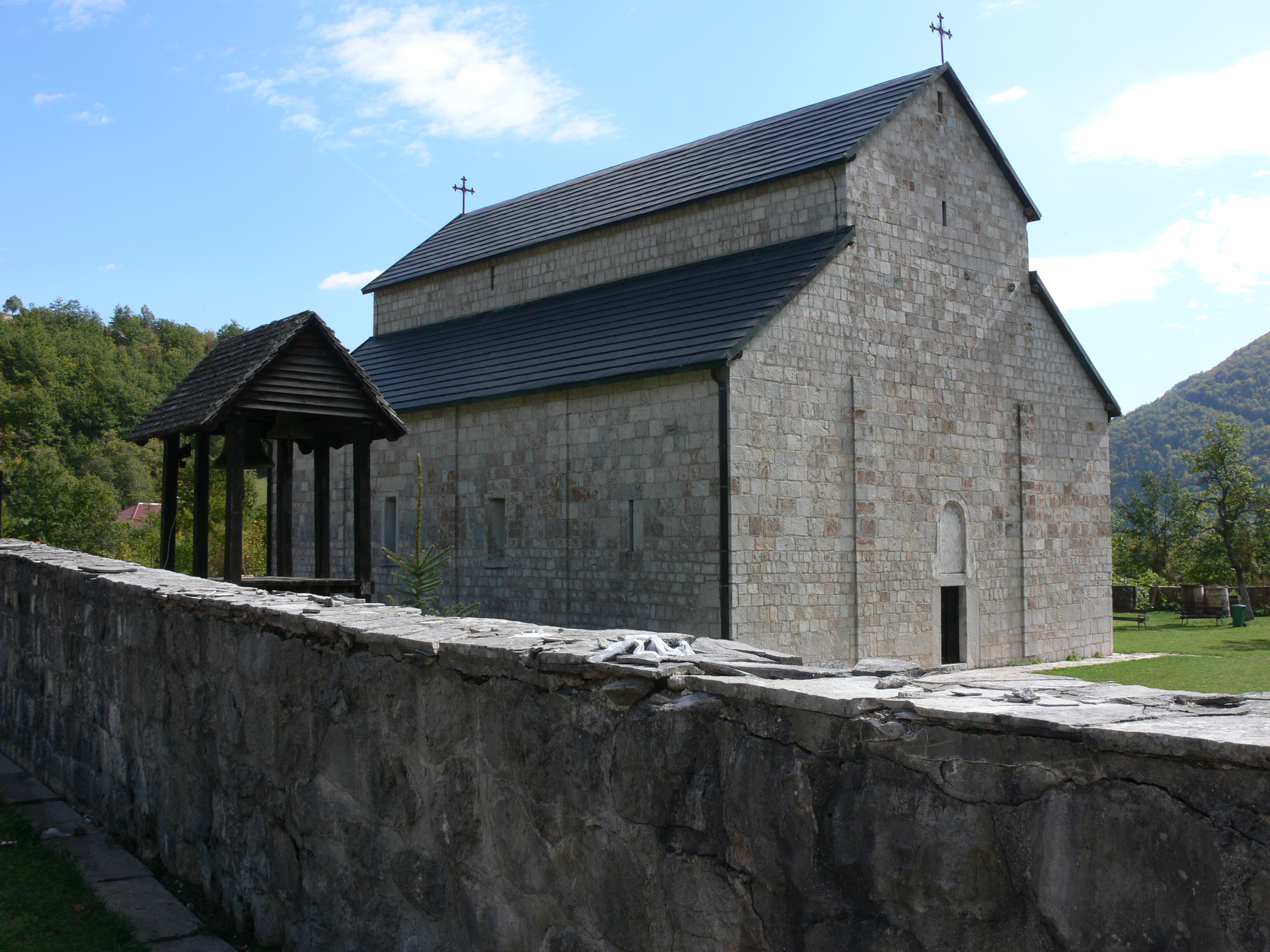
- Piva Monastery

- Location of Piva Monastery

Religion
- Affiliation: Serbian Orthodox Church
- Leadership: Herzeg Metropolitan Savatija
- Status: Active

Location
- Location: Piva, Montenegro, Montenegro
- Coordinates: 43.11°N 18.8186°E

Architecture
- Completed: Original 1573, relocated in 1982
- Materials: Stone

The Piva Monastery (Serbian: Манaстир Пивa, romanized: Manastir Piva) is located in Piva, Montenegro near the source of the Piva River in northern Montenegro. Built between 1573 and 1586, it was rebuilt in another location in 1982. It is the largest Serbian Orthodox church constructed during the Ottoman occupation in the 16th and 17th centuries. Noted for its frescoes, the monastery's treasures also include ritual objects, rare liturgical books, art, objects of precious metals and a psalm from the Crnojevići printing press (1493–96), which was the first in the Balkans. These are displayed in the monastery's museum.

== History ==
Founded in 1573, or 1575, and completed in 1586 through the expenditures of the Metropolitan bishop of Zachlumia, Herzegovina, and the Littoral Savatije Sokolović, who later became the Serbian Orthodox patriarch, the monastery church is dedicated to the Dormition of the Theotokos. The construction workers were brothers named Gavrilo and Vukašin.

Piva Monastery is included within the Eparchy of Budimlja and Nikšić. In 1982, a new reservoir, created by the Piva Hydro Electric Project, required moving the monastery. Stone by stone it was moved to the village of Goransko near Lake Mratinje.

== Geography ==
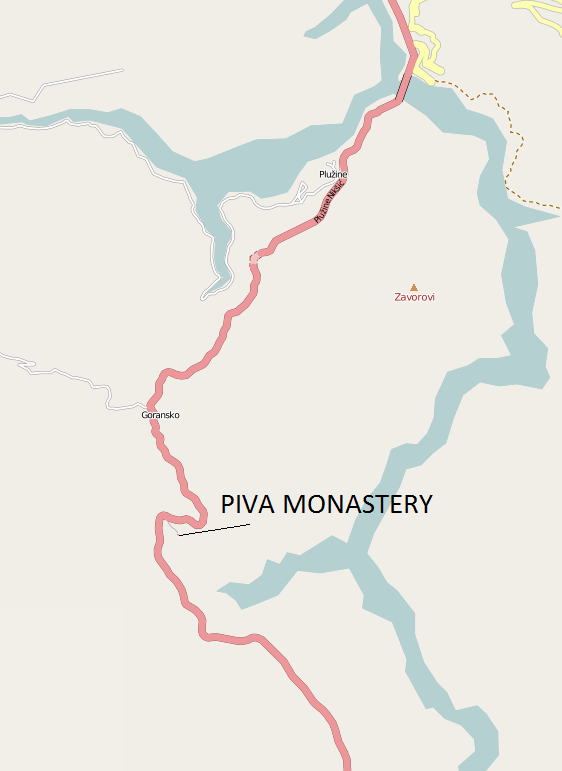
Location in relation to the Piva River, E-762 road, and villages of Goransko and Plužine

Piva Monastery is located in the village of Piva, just south of Goransko in northern Montenegro. It is accessible along the E-762 road, on the way to Foča. It lies approximately 55 kilometres (34 mi) from Nikšić and is 7 kilometres (4.3 mi) south of Plužine.

The monastery was originally located at the source of the Piva River, approximately 3 kilometres (1.9 mi) away from and 100 metres (330 ft) below the junction of the proposed Mratinje Dam, a hydroelectric plant. Begun in 1969 and completed in 1982, the monastery was moved to its current position, which included the removal and replacement of over 1000 fresco fragments, covering 1,260 square metres (13,600 sq ft).

== Architecture and fittings ==
Piva is a small stone structure. Its construction includes three naves with a taller middle nave. There is no cupola. The monastery contains archives, a library, and a treasury with 183 books and nearly 280 other items reported in 1991, including ritual objects, rare liturgical books, art and objects of precious metals. Also featured is a psalm from the Crnojevići printing press (1493–1496), which was the first printing press in the Balkans. It is dated to 1494 and was discovered by chance among other papers in the library of the monastery.

Much of the church was decorated by Greek painters between 1604 and 1606 and contains many frescoes. However, the upper porch area was painted by a local priest Strahinja of Budimlje; this included Akathist to the Mother of God. Other parts of the church, dating from 1626, were painted by Kozma who also painted many of the icons on the iconostasis. The icons of St. George and the Dormition of the Virgin are dated to about 1638–1639. The artist Zograf Longin painted the throne icons of the Mother of God, Christ and Assumption of the Mother of God. Piva, Morača and Mileševa monasteries have been described as "breathtaking medieval masterpieces that store ancient writings and works of art".

== Conservation ==
The church has been provided with drainage arrangements to prevent seepage of water inside the church so that the frescoes are protected from effects of humidity. In 2008, the U.S. Embassy at Podgorica provided $22,200 for the reconstruction of the drainage system.

== Gallery ==
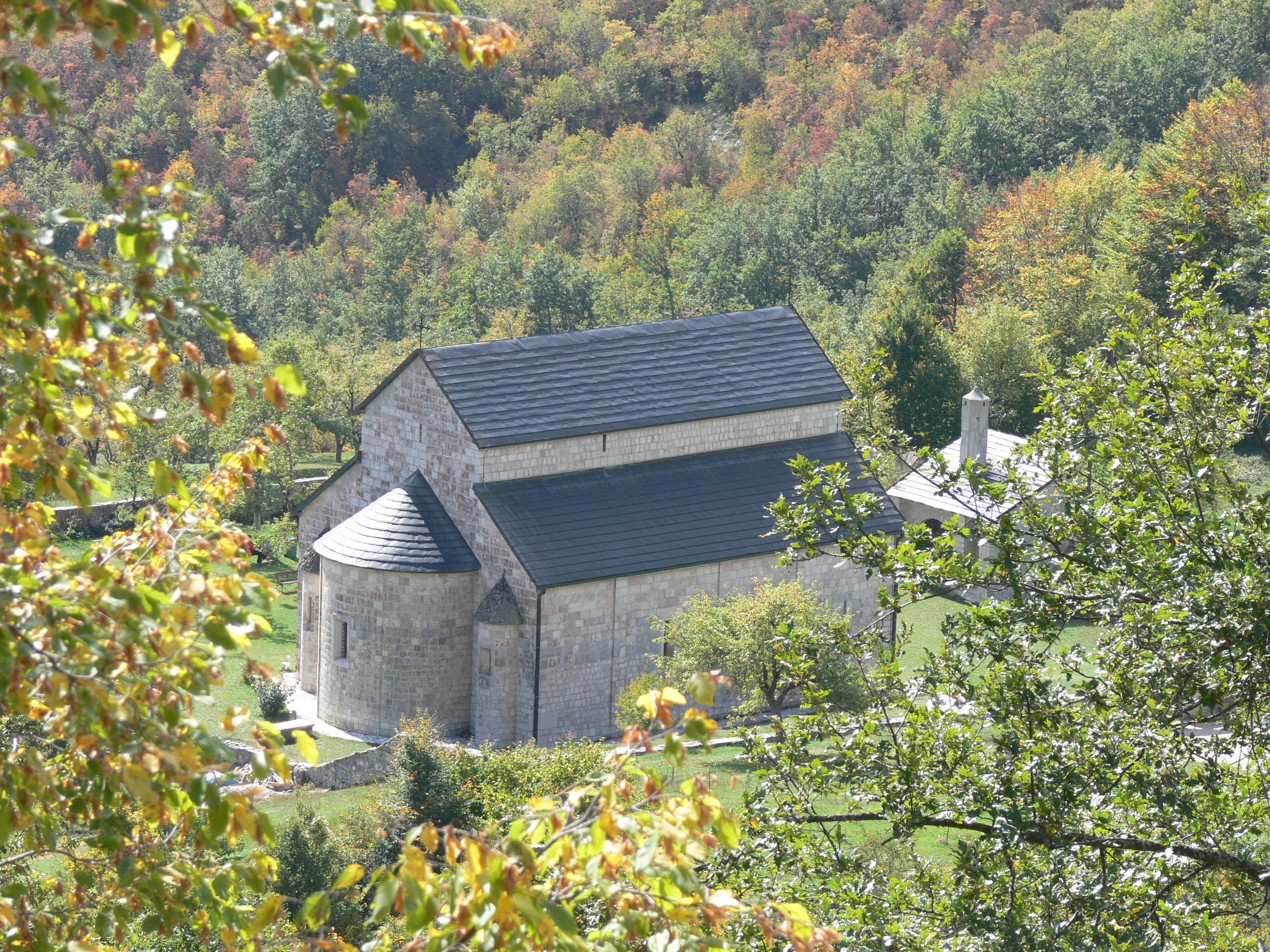
Monastery church

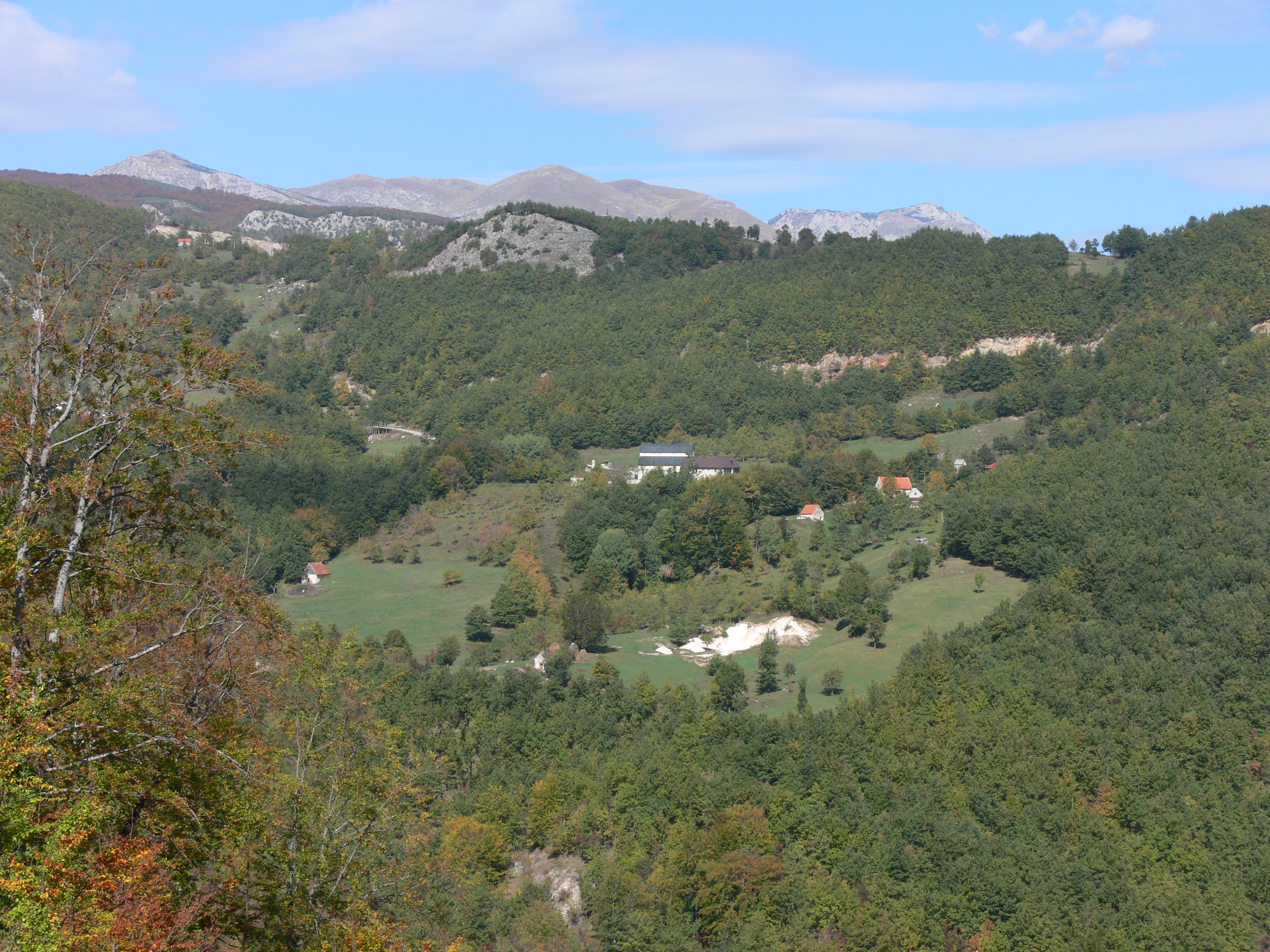
Aerial view

== See also ==
- List of Serbian Orthodox monasteries
