= Plužine =

Town and municipality in Northern Montenegro

Plužine Плужине
- Town and municipality
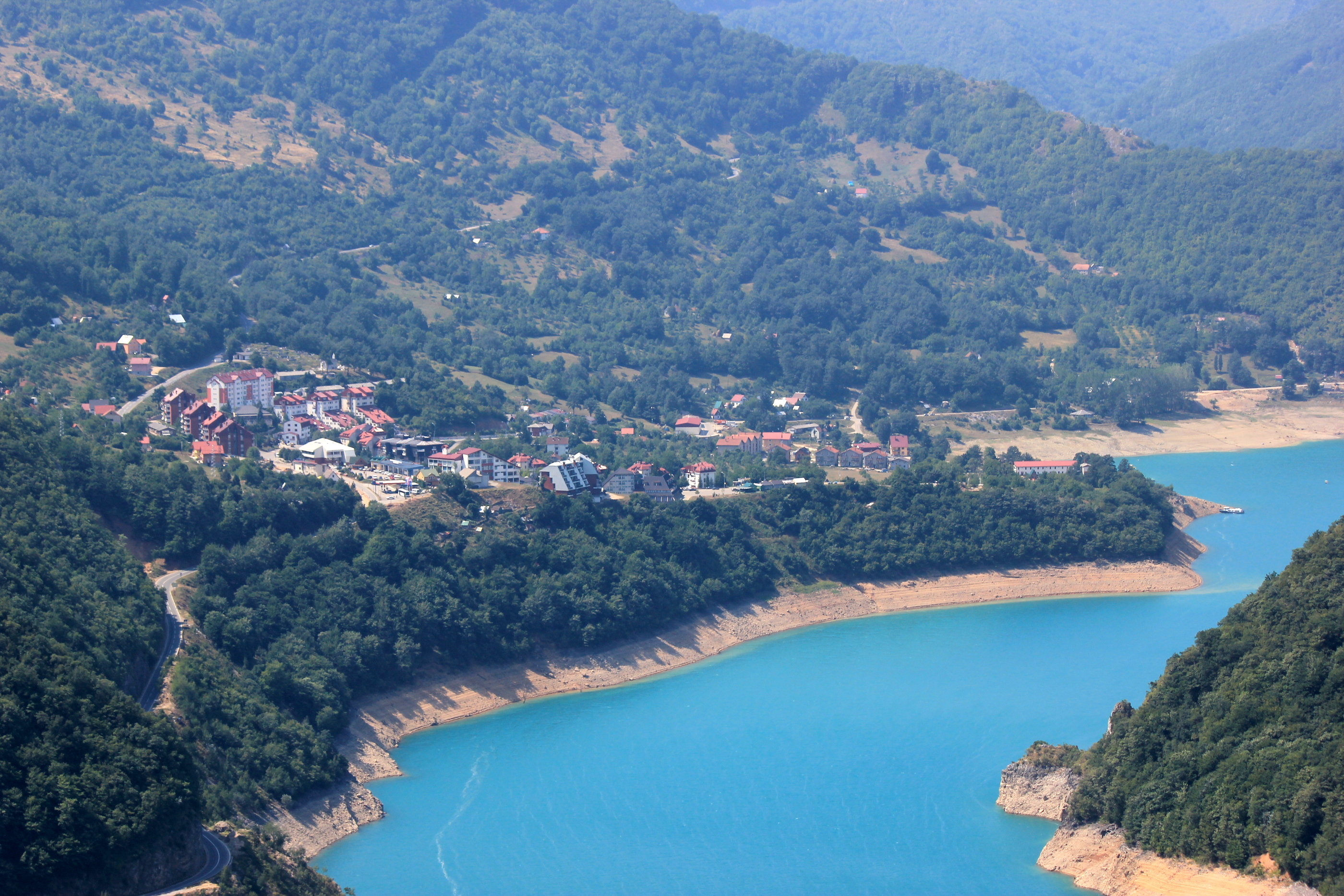

- Flag Coat of arms

- Location within Montenegro
- Coordinates: 43.15°N 18.83°E
- Country: Montenegro
- Region: Northern
- Municipality: Plužine
- Founded: 14th century
- Settlements: 43

Government
  - Type: Mayor-Assembly
  - Mayor: Slobodan Delić (SNP)

Area
  - Town and municipality: 854 km^{2} (330 sq mi)

Population (2011 census)
  - Density: 5/km^{2} (13/sq mi)
  - Urban: 1,102 ▼
  - Rural: 1,099 ▼
  - Municipality: 2,232 ▼
- Time zone: UTC+1 (CET)
  - Summer (DST): UTC+2 (CEST)
- Postal code: 81435
- Area code: +382 40
- ISO 3166-2 code: ME-15
- Car plates: PŽ
- Climate: Cfb
- Website: www.pluzine.me

Plužine (Montenegrin Cyrillic: Плужине, pronounced [plûʒinɛ]) is a town in Montenegro in the Northern Region. In 2023 it had a population of 1,102.

== Location ==
The municipality of Plužine is the seventh municipality in Montenegro in terms of area. The municipality is located in the north-west of Montenegro, along the border of Bosnia and Herzegovina. The town is located near the Piva lake (Pivsko) in the northwestern mountainous region of Montenegro, close to the Durmitor National Park area. Plužine is the administrative centre of the Plužine Municipality and also the unofficial centre of the Piva region, named after the Piva River and the historical tribe of Piva (Pivljani).

== Population ==
Plužine is the administrative centre of the Plužine municipality, which in 2023 had a population of 2,232. The town of Plužine itself had 1,102 citizens.

== History ==
Historically, it is the region of Old Herzegovina and is located in the central parts of Old Herzegovina. It was annexed by Montenegro after the Berlin Congress in 1878.

=== Historical population ===
Population of the Town of Plužine:

- 1981 - 730
- 1991 - 1,453
- 2003 - 1,494
- 2011 - 1,341
- 2023 - 1,102

=== Ethnic composition ===
Ethnic groups (1991 census):

- Montenegrins (91.61%)
- Serbs (6.63%)

Ethnic groups (2003 census):

- Serbs (63.92%)
- Montenegrins (29.79%)

Ethnic groups (2011 census):

- Serbs (65.65%)
- Montenegrins (27.79)

== International relations ==
=== Twin towns — Sister cities ===
Plužine is twinned with:

- Kraljevo, Serbia
- Ljubljana, Slovenia

== Transport ==
The town is close to the border crossing with Bosnia and Herzegovina (Herzegovina region) for the town of Gacko and Foča.

Plužine is located on a road connecting central Montenegrin cities Podgorica and Nikšić with central Bosnia and Herzegovina.

== Gallery ==
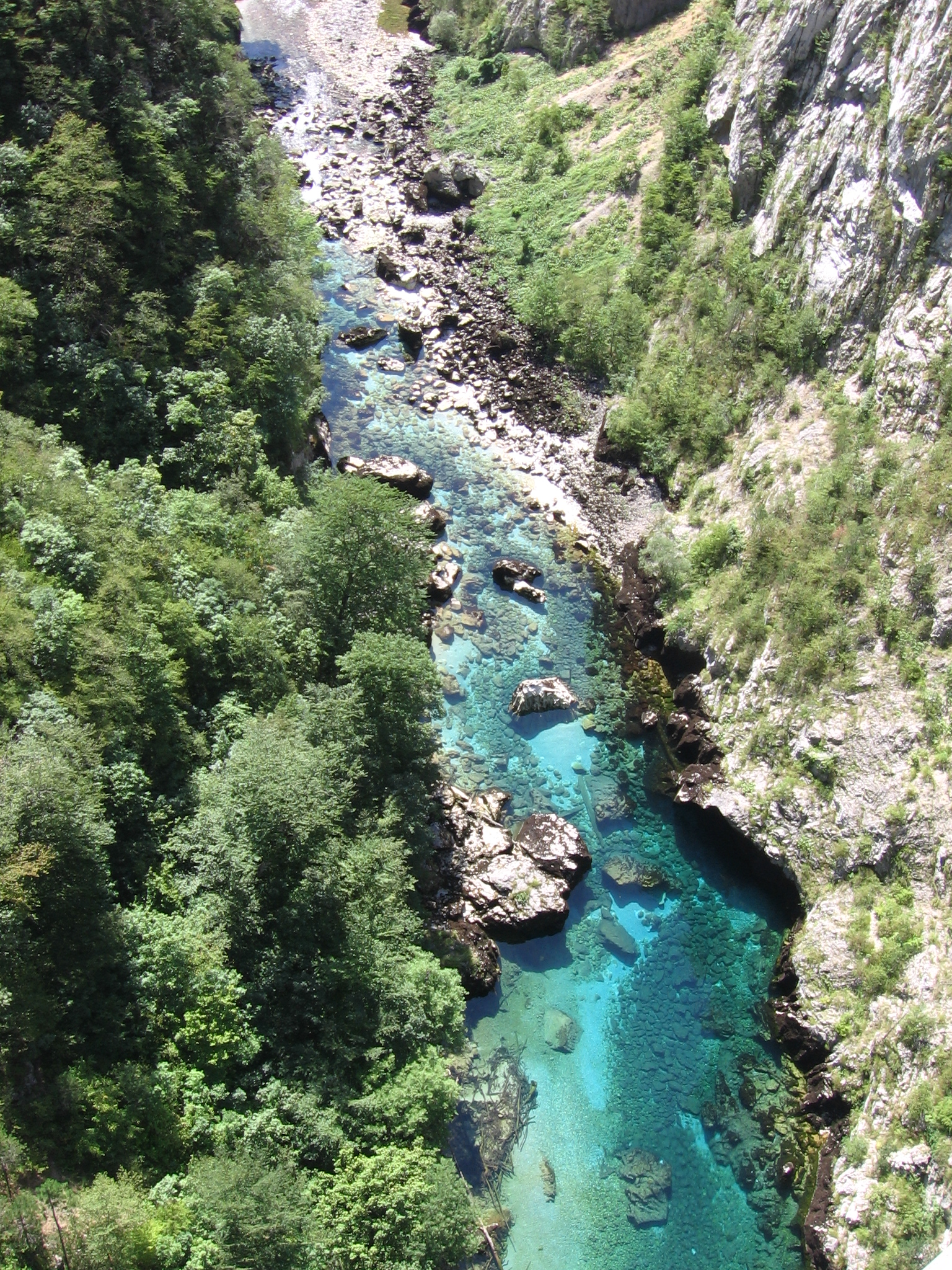
Piva river

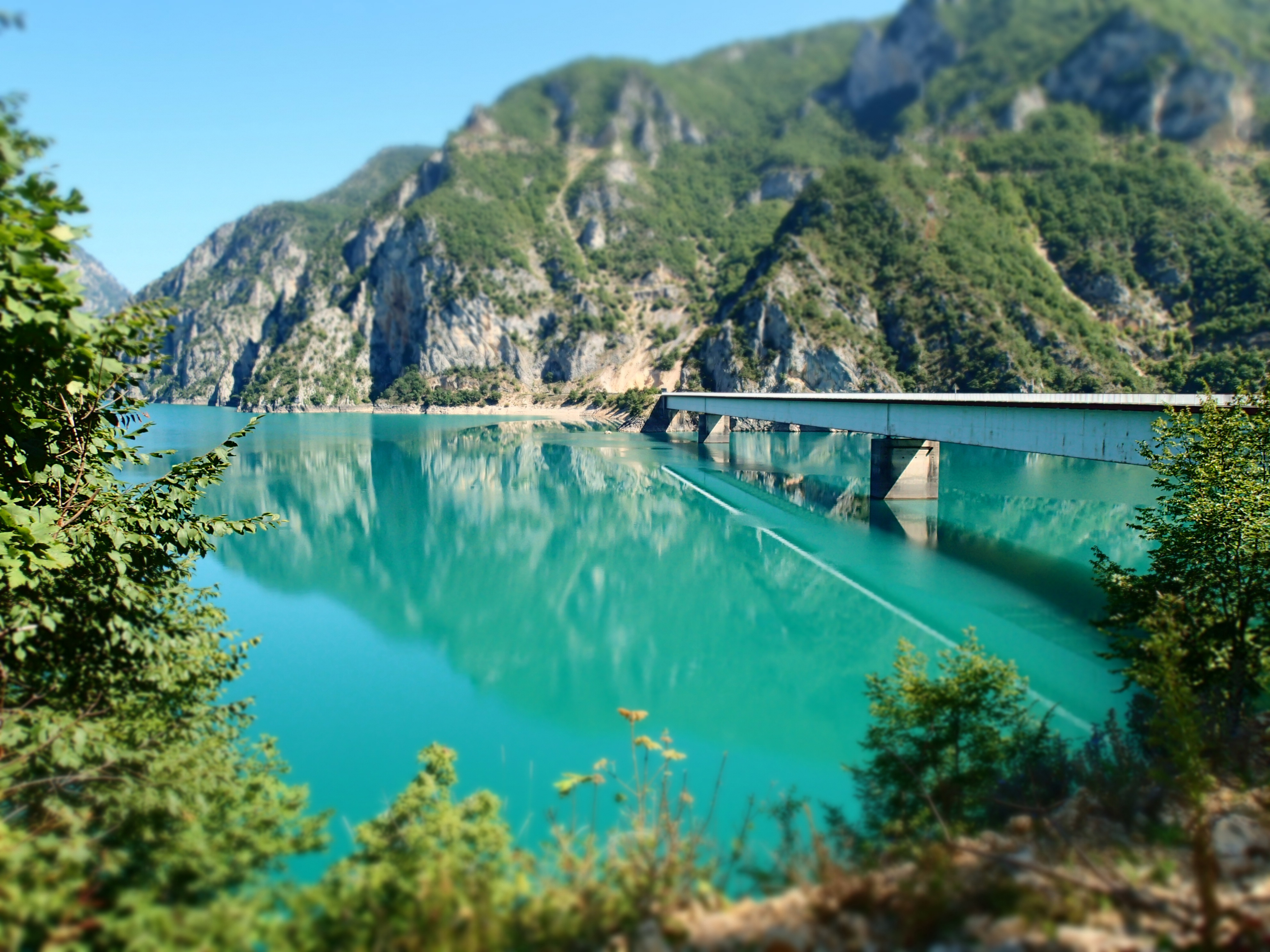
Lake Piva bridge

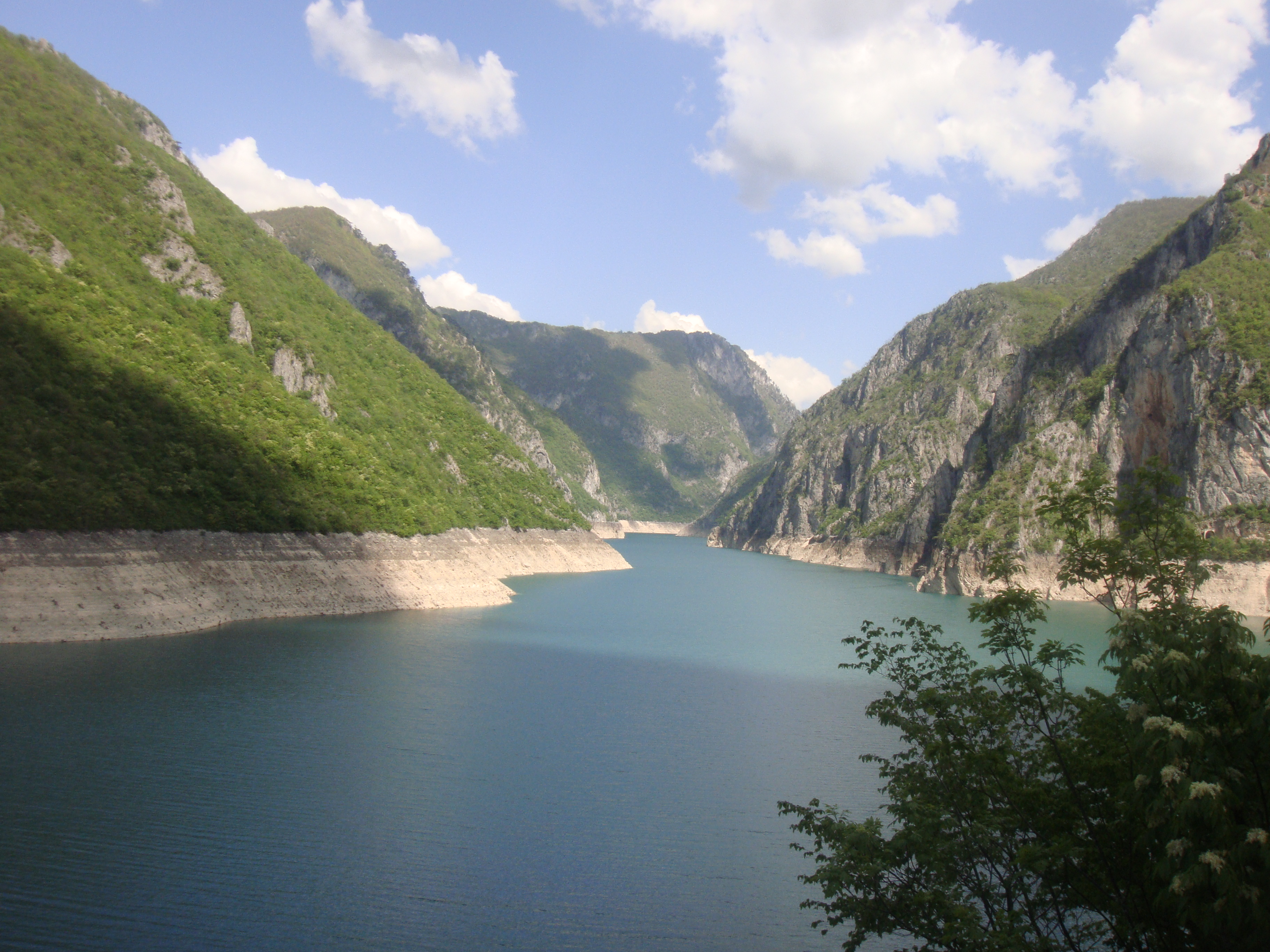
Piva lake

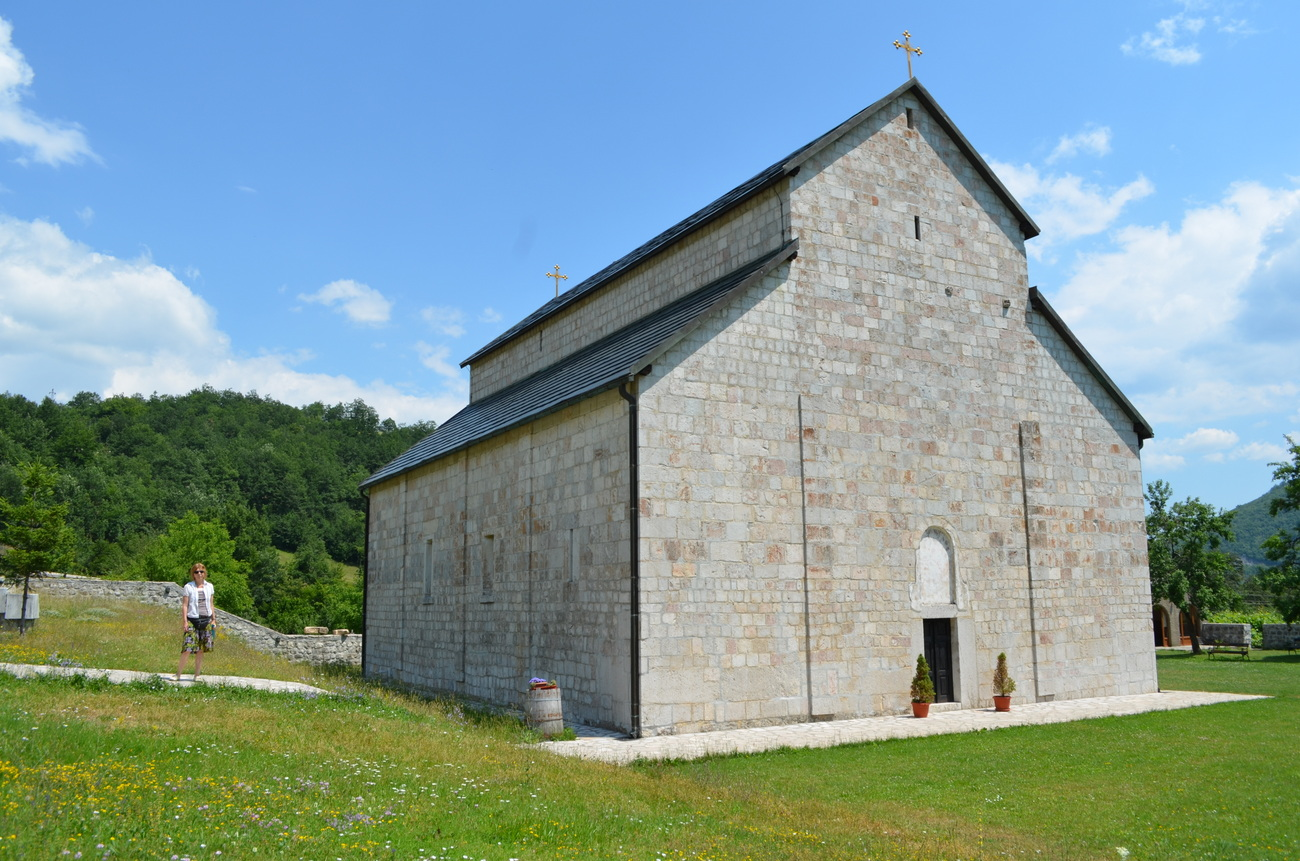
Piva Monastery
