= Piva (Drina) =

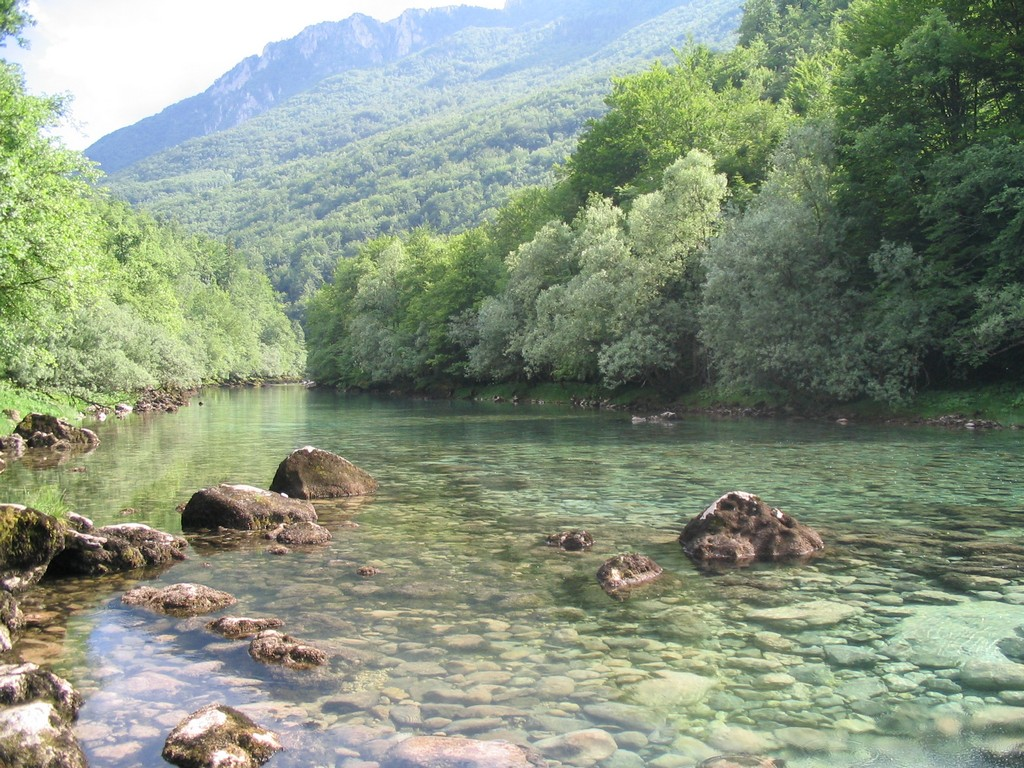

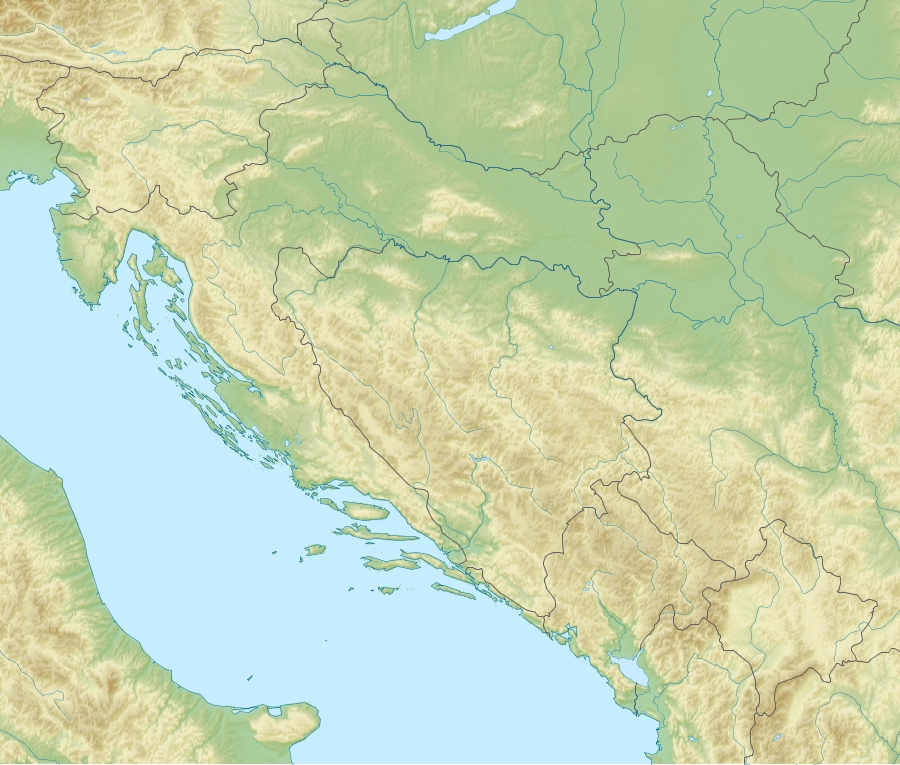
- Location within Dinaric Alps

Location
- Country: Montenegro, Bosnia and Herzegovina

Physical characteristics
- Mouth
  - location: Drina
  - coordinates: 43.3484°N 18.8396°E
- Length: 35 km (22 mi) 120 km (75 mi) as part of the system Tušina→Bukovica→Komarnica→Piva
- Basin size: 1,784 km^{2} (689 sq mi)

Basin features
- Progression: Drina→ Sava→ Danube→ Black Sea

The Piva (Cyrillic: Пива, pronounced [pîʋa]) is a river in Montenegro and Bosnia and Herzegovina. The river runs through Montenegro for most of its course length, and in its last three kilometres marks the border between the two countries.

== Course ==
The Piva emerges from the Sinjac wellspring (Cyrillic: Сињац; etymologically sinjac is derivative of sinji/sinje/sinja, rooted in proto-Slavic, and means having a blue tinge, bluish color, gray, gray-blue, so Sinjac could be translated in modern as Serbo-Croatian: Plavac), which is also simply called Wellspring of Piva (transl. Vrelo Pive; Cyrillic: Врело Пиве), situated near the Piva Monastery below Golija mountain. After a kilometer or so, and before the artificial Lake Piva was formed, the waters from the spring rushed into the river Komarnica, thus creating the Piva river for the next 34 km.

The canyon is cut between the mountains of Bioč, Volujak, Maglić, and Pivska Planina. It is 33 km long and up to 1,200 m deep. The river supplies the power station at Mratinje Dam (342 MW), which dammed the canyon in 1975. The dam is 220 m high, one of the highest in Europe, and creates Lake Piva, second-largest in Montenegro (12.5 km^{2}, altitude 675 m, 188 m deep), which flooded the old location of the monastery of Piva from the 16th century, so the monastery was moved to the new one. The Vrbnica river flows from the left into the lake.

After the dam, the Piva continues straight to the north, meets the Tara at Šćepan Polje on the border with Bosnia and Herzegovina, and creates the Drina.

The Piva belongs to the Black Sea drainage basin with its own drainage area of 1784 km^{2} and is not navigable.

== Headwaters ==
Komarnica is part of an 86-kilometre-long river system Tušina→Bukovica→Pridvorica→Komarnica, which all feed into the Piva, so the latter is nicknamed "the river with five names". Measured from the source of the Tušina river, the river would be 120 km long.

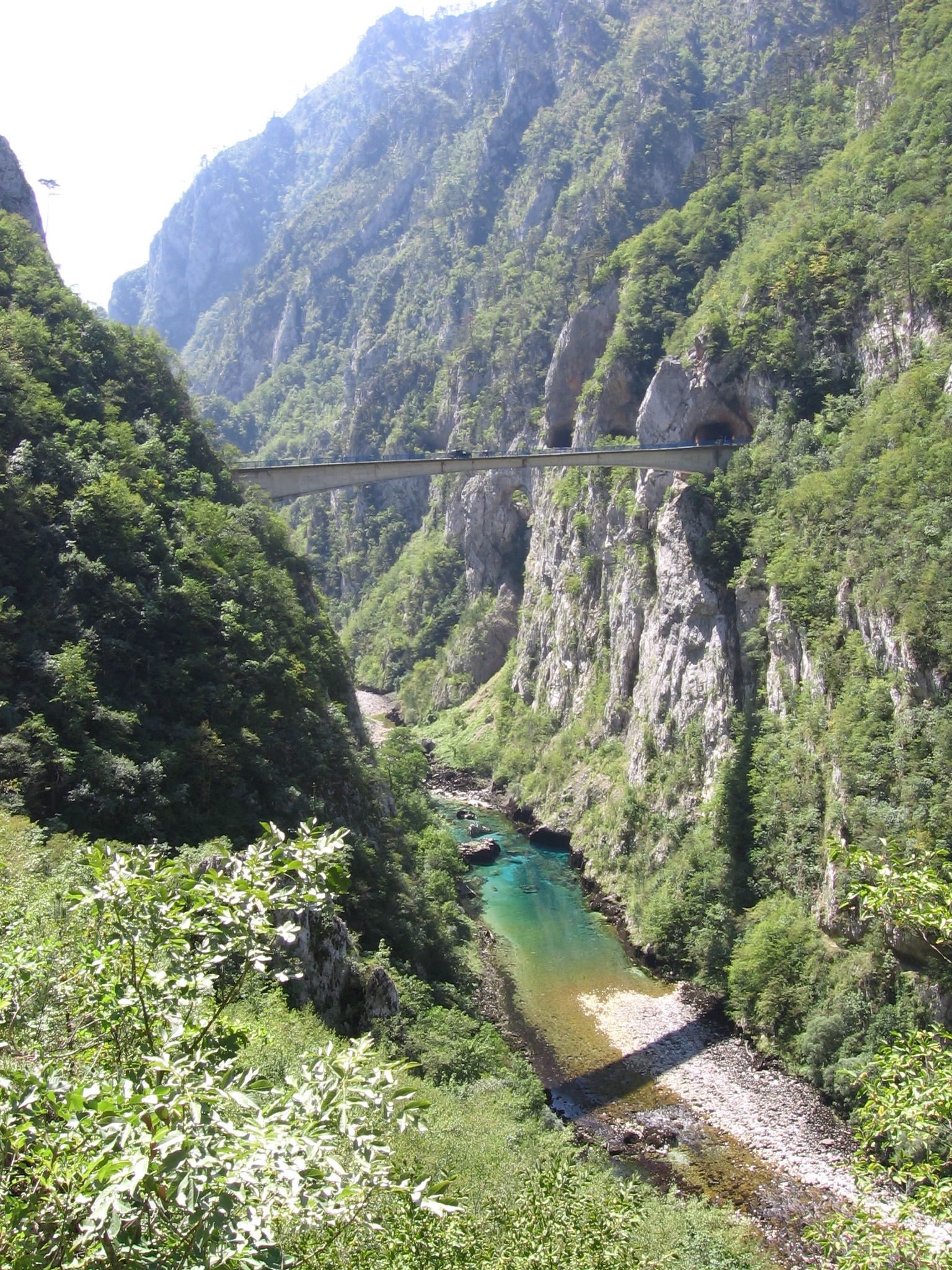
Bridge over the Piva river, canyon just downstream from Mratinje dam

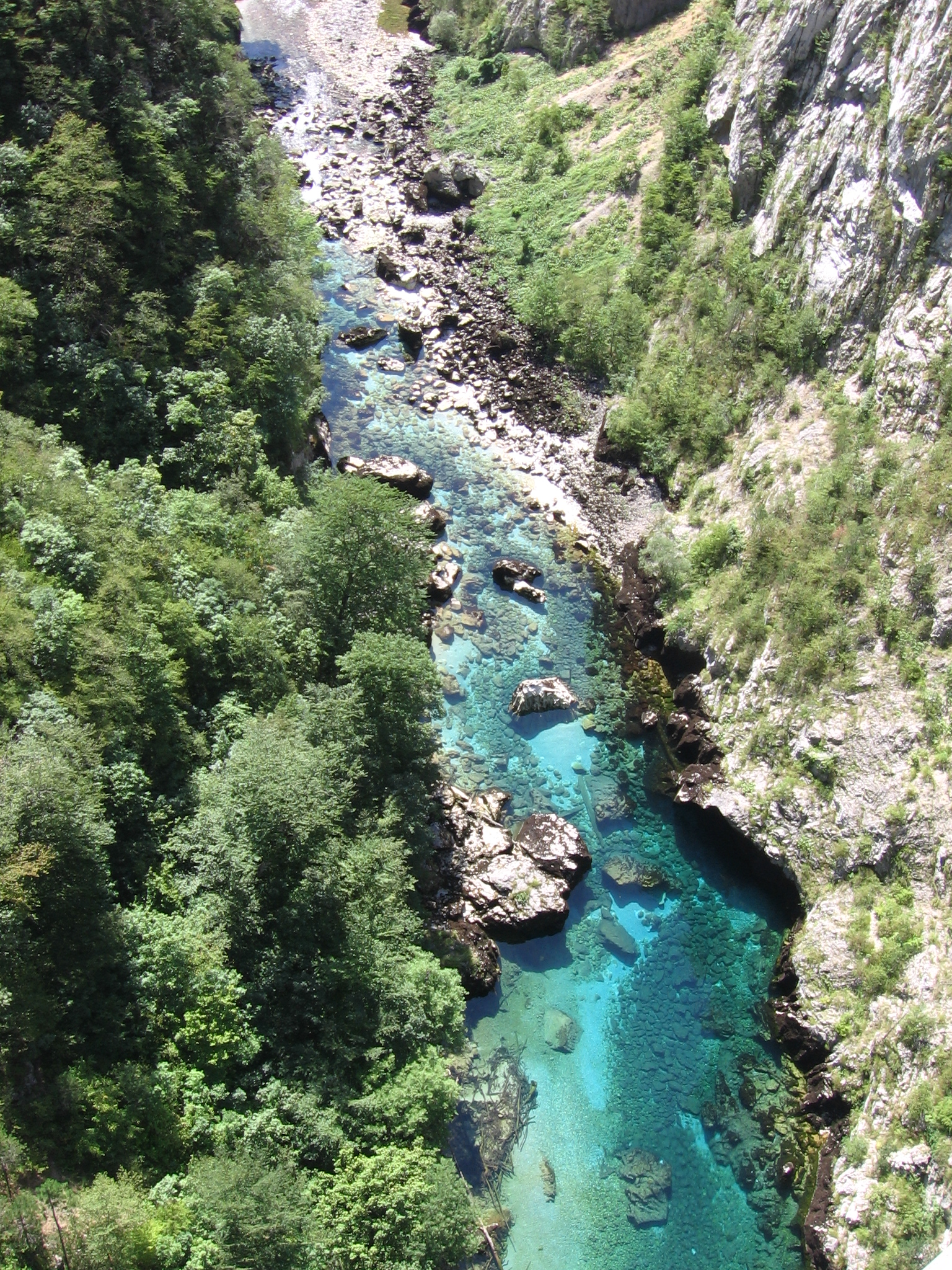
Piva river, canyon view from the same bridge (above photo)

The Tušina originates from the mountain Sinjajevina in the Uskoci region of central Montenegro, just few kilometers away from the source of another important Montenegrin river, Morača. The river flows to the west, between the Sinjajevina and Lola mountains, next to the villages of Krnja Jela, Bare, Boan, and Tušina. It receives the Bukovica river from the north, and continues further under that name. After the river passes the regional center of Šavnik and the villages of Gradac and Pridvorica in the region of Drobnjaci, the stream is also referred to as Pridvorica, until it receives the Komarnica from the north near Duži, when it takes the name Komarnica.

The Komarnica continues between the mountains of Vojnik and Treskavac, in an almost uninhabited area, and enters the high Piva Plateau, where it turns north. The course there is flooded by the reservoir of the Lake Piva, near to where it used to receive from the right outflow of the Piva spring, and enters the deep Piva canyon.

== Piva Plateau ==
Pivska Površ (Cyrillic: Пивска Површ) is a high limestone plateau in the drainage area of Piva, between the mountains of Durmitor, Maglić, Lebršnik, Golija, and Vojnik. The plateau is 55 km long and 30 km wide, with an average altitude of 1200 m; its highest point is 2159 m. The flow of Komarnica-Piva divides it in two regions: western, Pivska Župa (Cyrillic: Пивска Жупа), and eastern, Pivska Planina (Cyrillic: Пивска Планина). The area is characterized by many limestone features, like cavities (called vrtača, вртача), deep pits and excavations, and extremely sparse population (some 20 smaller settlements in Pivska Župa and 15 in Pivska Planina). Livestock breeding is developed though, especially sheep.

== See also ==
- Tara (Drina)
- Drina

== Sources ==
- Mala Prosvetina Enciklopedija, Third edition (1985); Prosveta; ISBN 86-07-00001-2
- Jovan Đ. Marković (1990): Enciklopedijski geografski leksikon Jugoslavije; Svjetlost-Sarajevo; ISBN 86-01-02651-6
