= List of rivers of Montenegro =

This is a list of rivers in Montenegro.

- Bijela
- Bistrica
- Bukovica
- Bojana
- Cijevna
- Ćehotina
- Grnčar
- Ibar
- Komarnica
- Lim
- Lještanica
- Ljuboviđa
- Ljuča
- Morača
- Mrtvica
- Ospanica
- Piva
- Ribnica
- Rijeka Crnojevića
- Sitnica
- Šavnik
- Tara
- Trebišnjica
- Veruša
- Vrmoša
- Zeta
- Željeznica

== Gallery ==
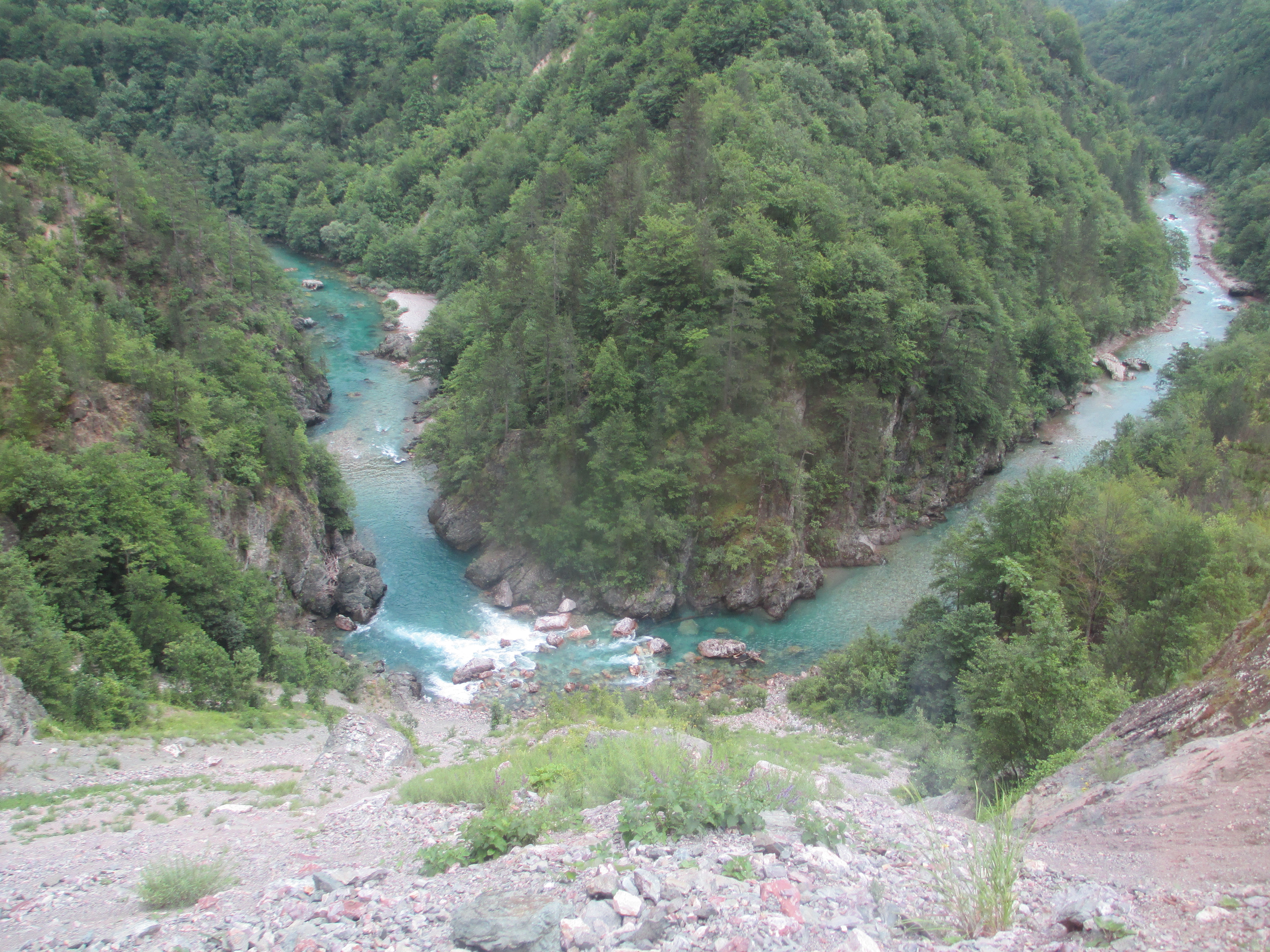
Tara

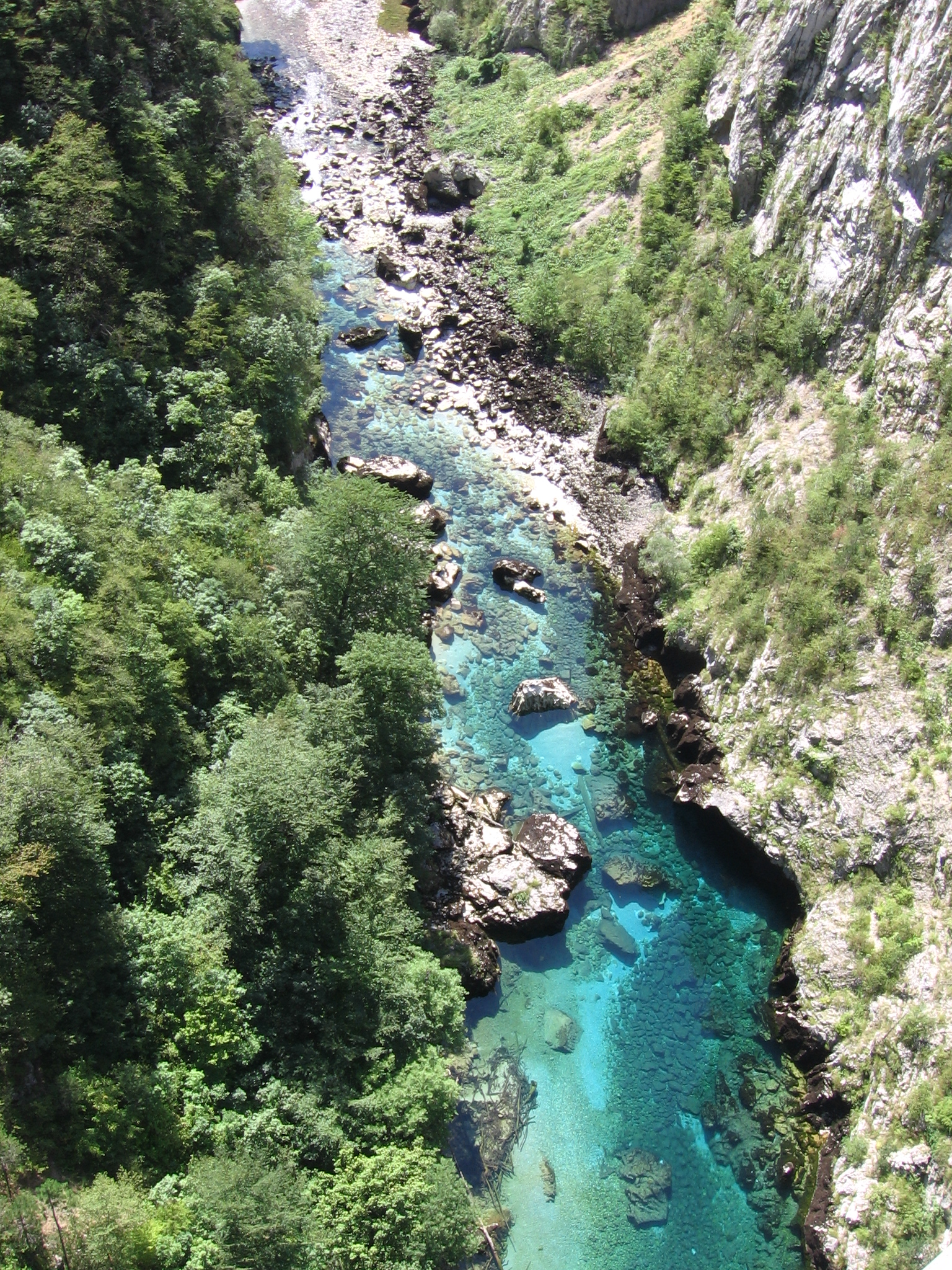
Piva

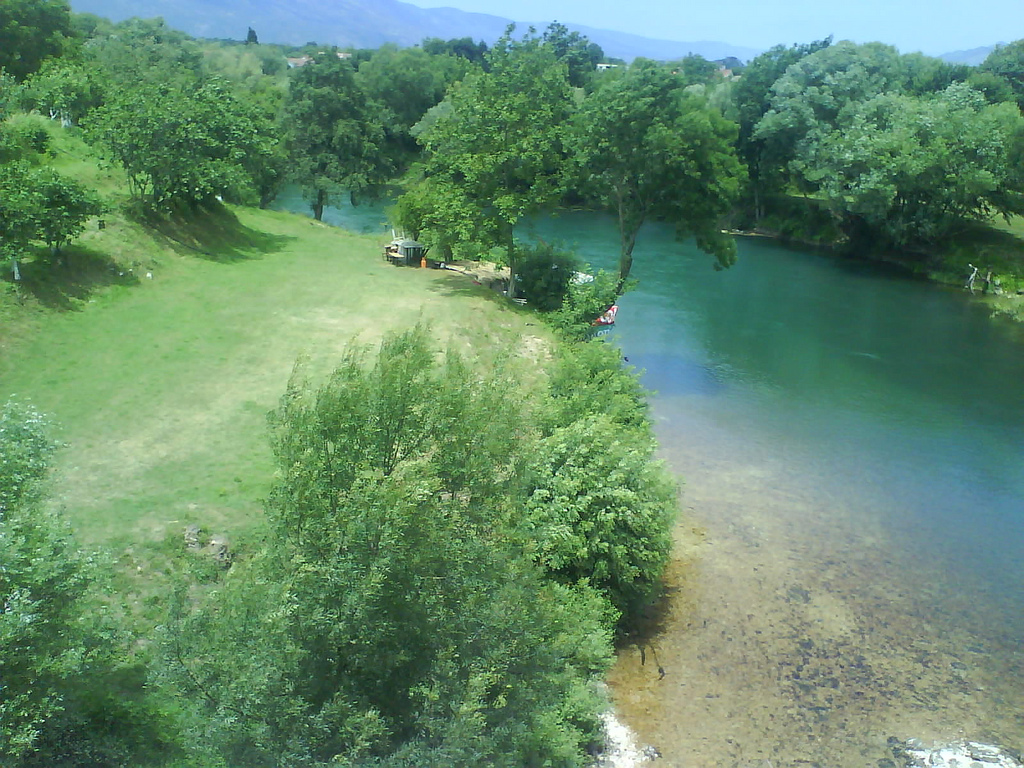
Zeta

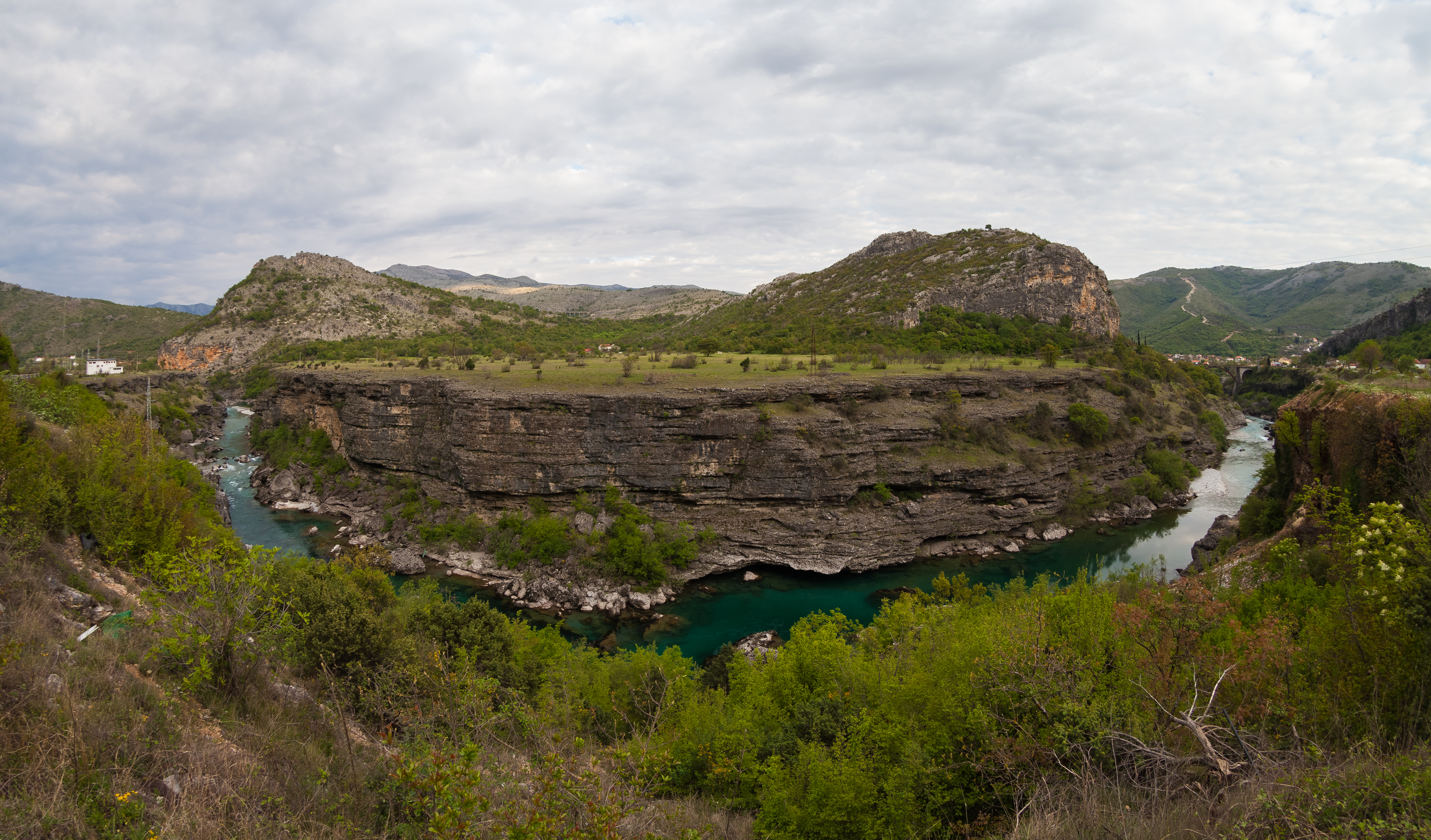
Morača

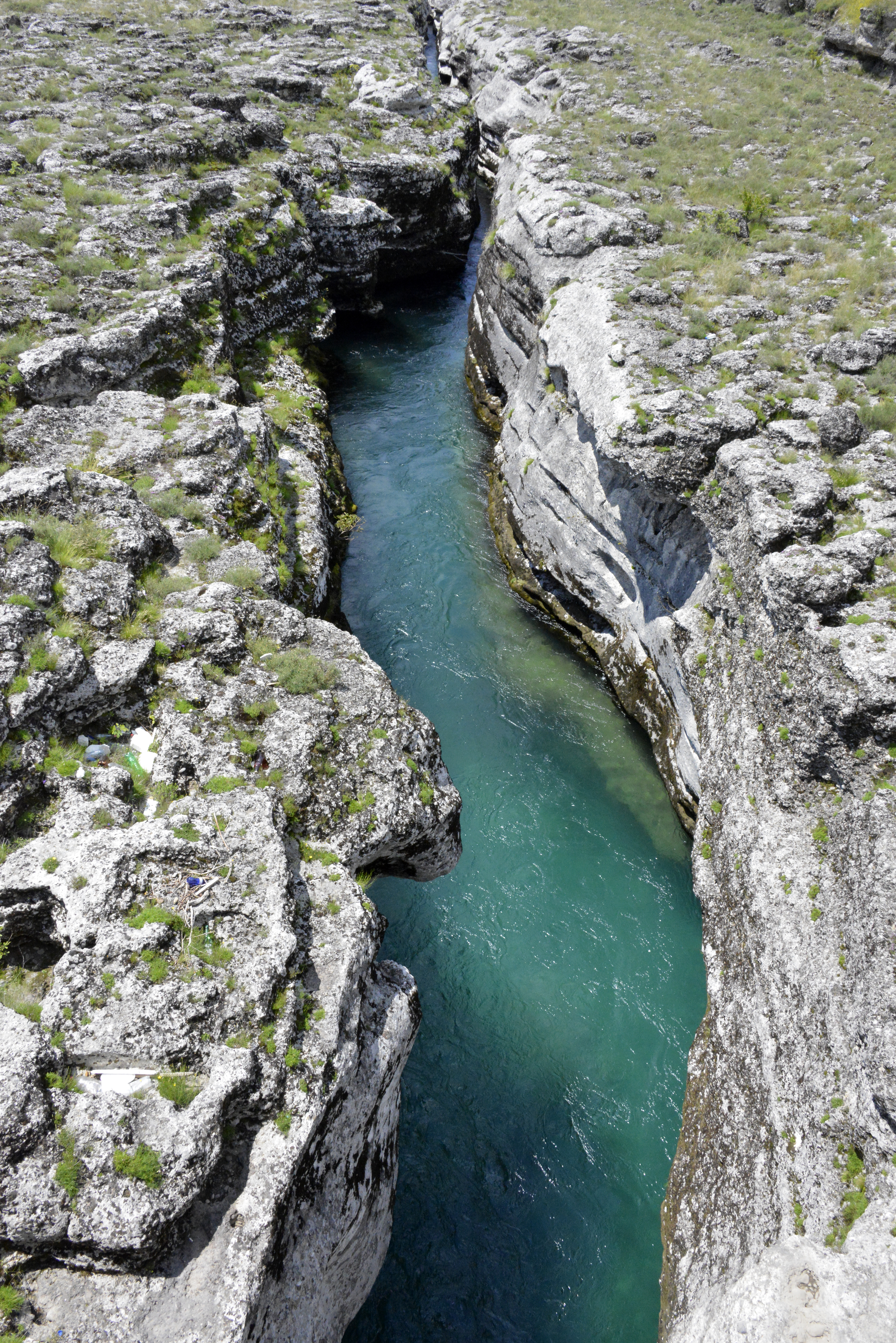
Cijevna

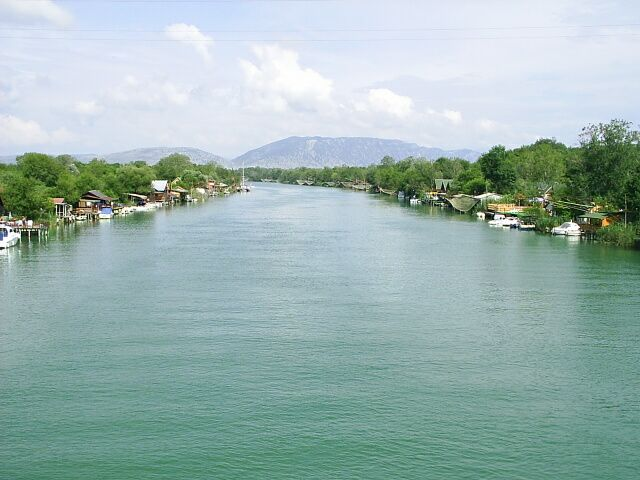
Bojana

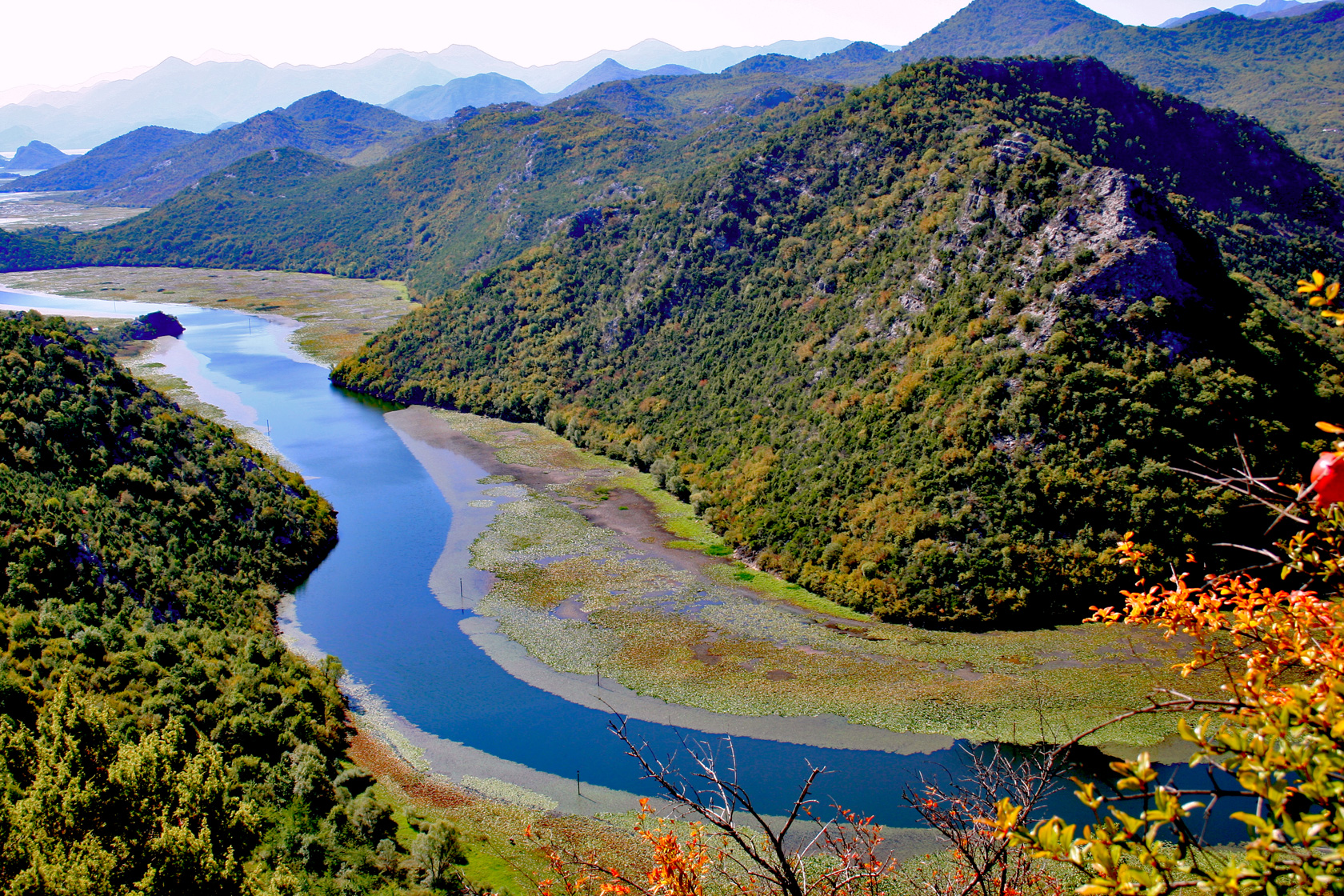
Rijeka Crnojevića

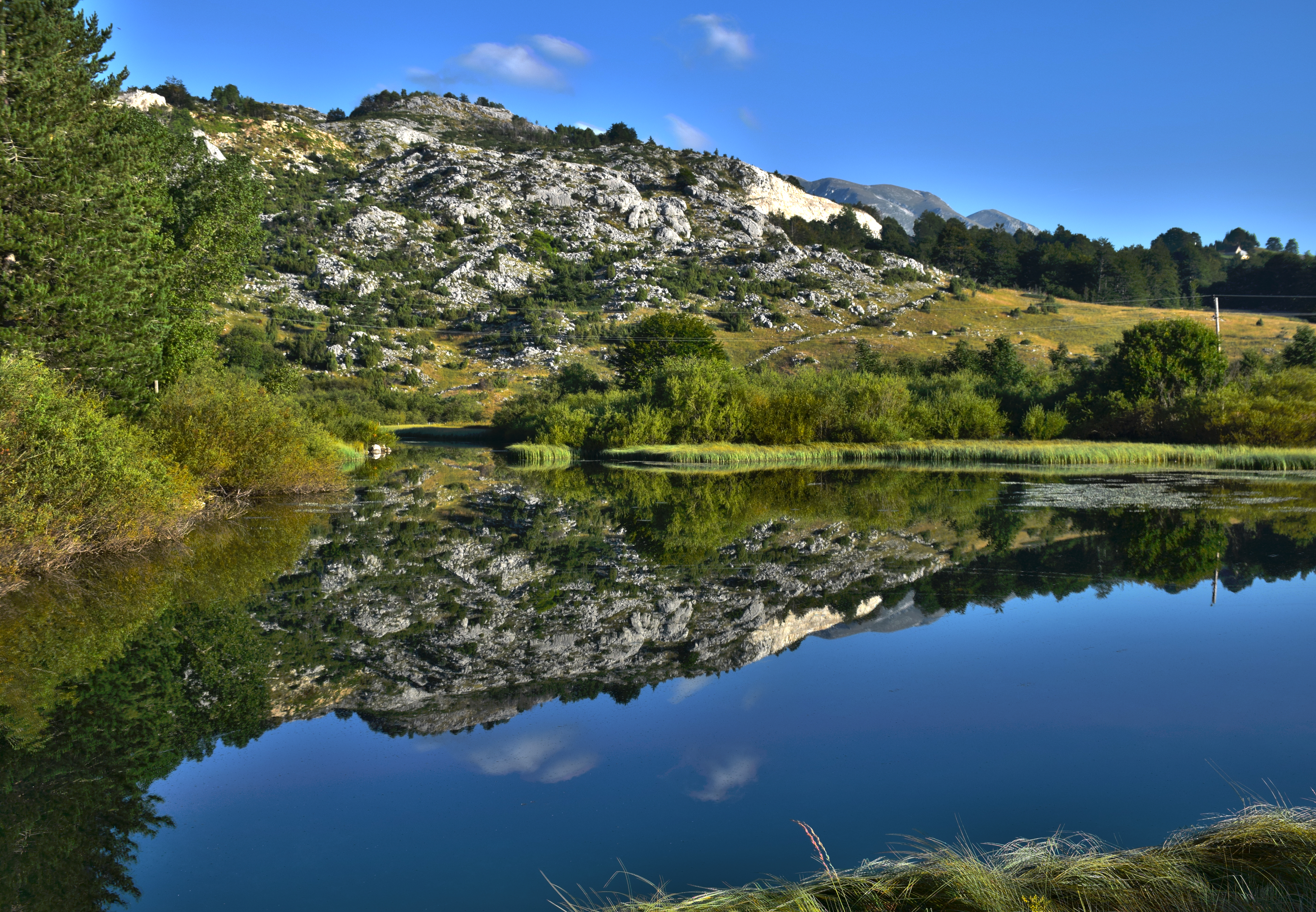
Bukovica
