= R20 =

R20 may refer to:

== Roads ==
- R-20 regional road (Montenegro)
- Small Ring, Brussels, a ring road in Belgium

== Other uses ==
- Chloroform, a refrigerant
- HMCS Crusader (R20), a destroyer of the Royal Canadian Navy and Royal Navy
- R20: Harmful by inhalation, a risk phrase
- R20 battery, a dry cell battery
- R20 Regions of Climate Action, a nonprofit environmental organization
- R20 series, preferred numbers in industrial design
- Renault 20, a French executive car
- Small nucleolar RNA R20
- The LMT R-20 Rahe is an assault rifle of EDF made by LMT
- Toyota TownAce (R20), a Japanese van
- USS R-20 (SS-97), a 1918 submarine of the United States Navy
