= R21 =

R21, R-21 or R.21 may refer to:

== Military ==
- R-21 (missile), a Soviet submarine-launched ballistic missile
- HMAS Melbourne (R21), an aircraft carrier of the Royal Australian Navy
- HMS Chivalrous (R21), a destroyer of the Royal Navy
- USS R-21 (SS-98), a submarine of the United States Navy
- Yugoslav destroyer Kotor

== Roads ==
- R-21 regional road (Montenegro)
- R21 (South Africa)
- R21 highway (Russia)

== Science and medicine ==
- Dichlorofluoromethane, a refrigerant
- R21: Harmful in contact with skin, a risk phrase
- R21/Matrix-M a Malaria vaccine
- Small nucleolar RNA R21

== Other uses ==
- R21 (New York City Subway car)
- Kwanyama dialect
- Renault 21, a French family car
- Tumansky R-21, a Soviet turbojet engine
