= Podmalinsko Monastery =

Serbian Orthodox monastery near Šavnik, Montenegro

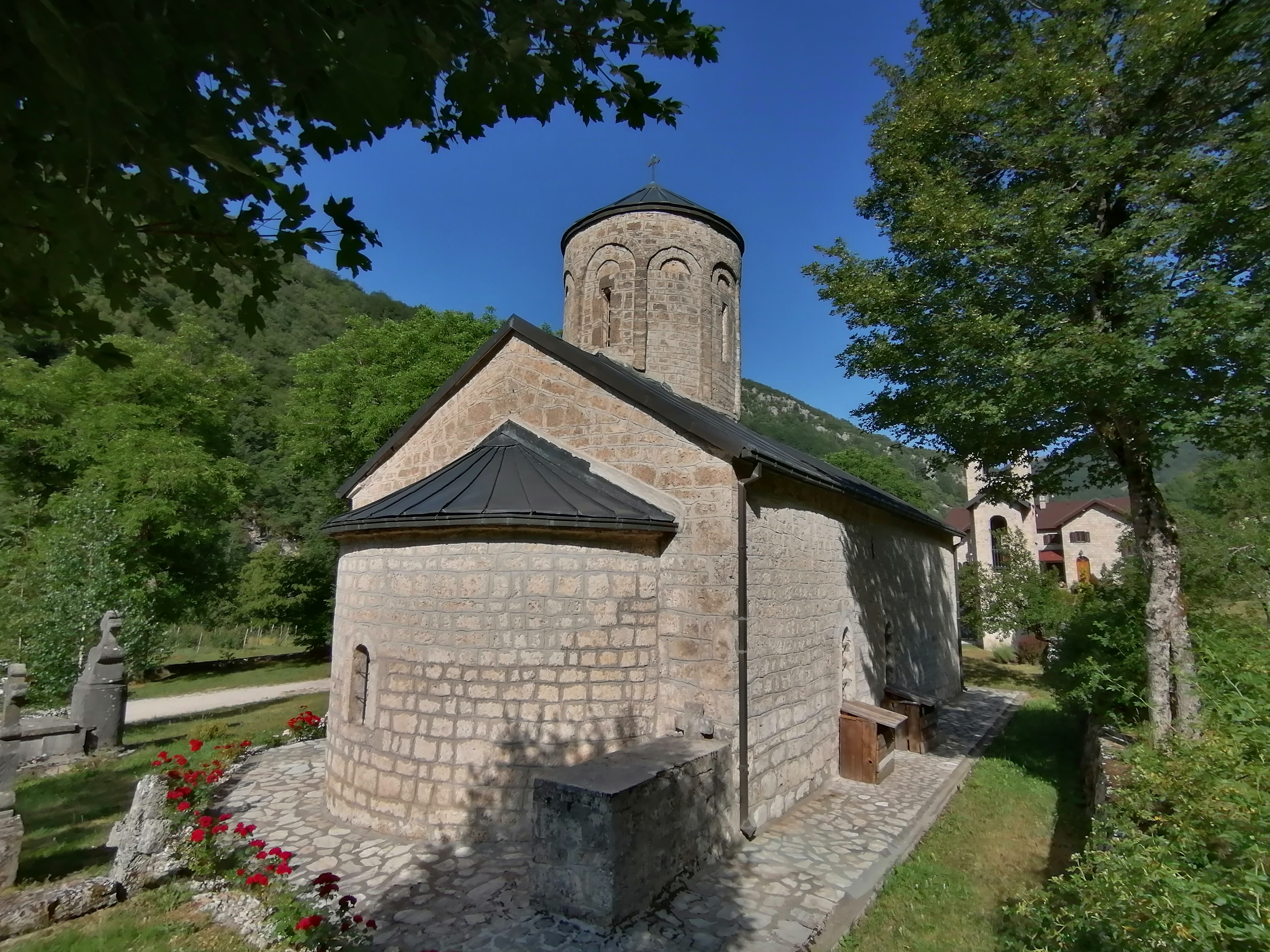

- Location within Montenegro

Religion
- Affiliation: Serbian Orthodox Church
- Ecclesiastical or organizational status: Eparchy of Budimlja and Nikšić

Location
- Location: in the valley of river Bukovica near village Tušina, Šavnik, central Montenegro
- State: Kingdom of Serbia, modern-day Montenegro
- Interactive map of Podmalinsko Monastery
- Coordinates: 42.9554°N 19.1587°E

Architecture
- Founder: Stephen Uroš I of Serbia
- Completed: about 1252

Specifications
- Length: 16.5 m
- Width: 7.5 m
- Materials: a local limestone called siga

Website
- http://www.eparhija.me/manastir-podmalinsko

The Podmalinsko Monastery (Serbian: Манастир Подмалинско, romanized: Manastir Podmalinsko), also known as the Tušinski Monastery, is a Serbian Orthodox monastery near Šavnik in modern-day Montenegro (then Kingdom of Serbia).

== Etymology ==
The name of the monastery is derived from the name of the village Malinsko on the hill Kravica, on the other side of the river Bukovica. It means beneath (Serbian: под, pod) Malinsko. The monastery was also referred to as Tušinski Monastery after the nearby village Tušina.

== Location and buildings ==
The monastery is situated in the valley of the river Bukovica, next to its right bank, between the villages of Malinsko and Tušina in the region traditionally belonging to Drobnjaci and to Uskoci.

The church of the monastery is dedicated to St. Michael. St. Michael was slava of Nemanjić family. North of the church there are ruins of the various buildings that once belonged to this monastery and small graveyard with the grave of Mirko Aleksić, a notable voivode of Malinsko who cut off the head of Smail-aga Čengić, killed by unknown Montenegrin fighter in 1840 on Mletičak plateau near the monastery.

== History ==
It is believed to be built by Stephen Uroš I of Serbia around 1252. According to the legend, he built this monastery right after Stefan Vukanović Nemanjić built Morača Monastery. People were lined along 20 kilometres (12 mi) route between the stone mine in Tušina village and the construction site of Morača Monastery. When the building of the Morača Monastery was completed the stones that remained in the hands of the lined people were returned to place near the mine and used to build Podmalinsko Monastery. The monastery was destroyed and rebuilt many times in its history. The monastery was gathering place of the members of Drobnjaci tribe who traditionally held meetings there, last time in 1840 to decide to inform Njegoš about their intention to kill Smail-aga Čengić. After this event Ottomans plundered Drobnjaci and destroyed the monastery.

== Gallery ==
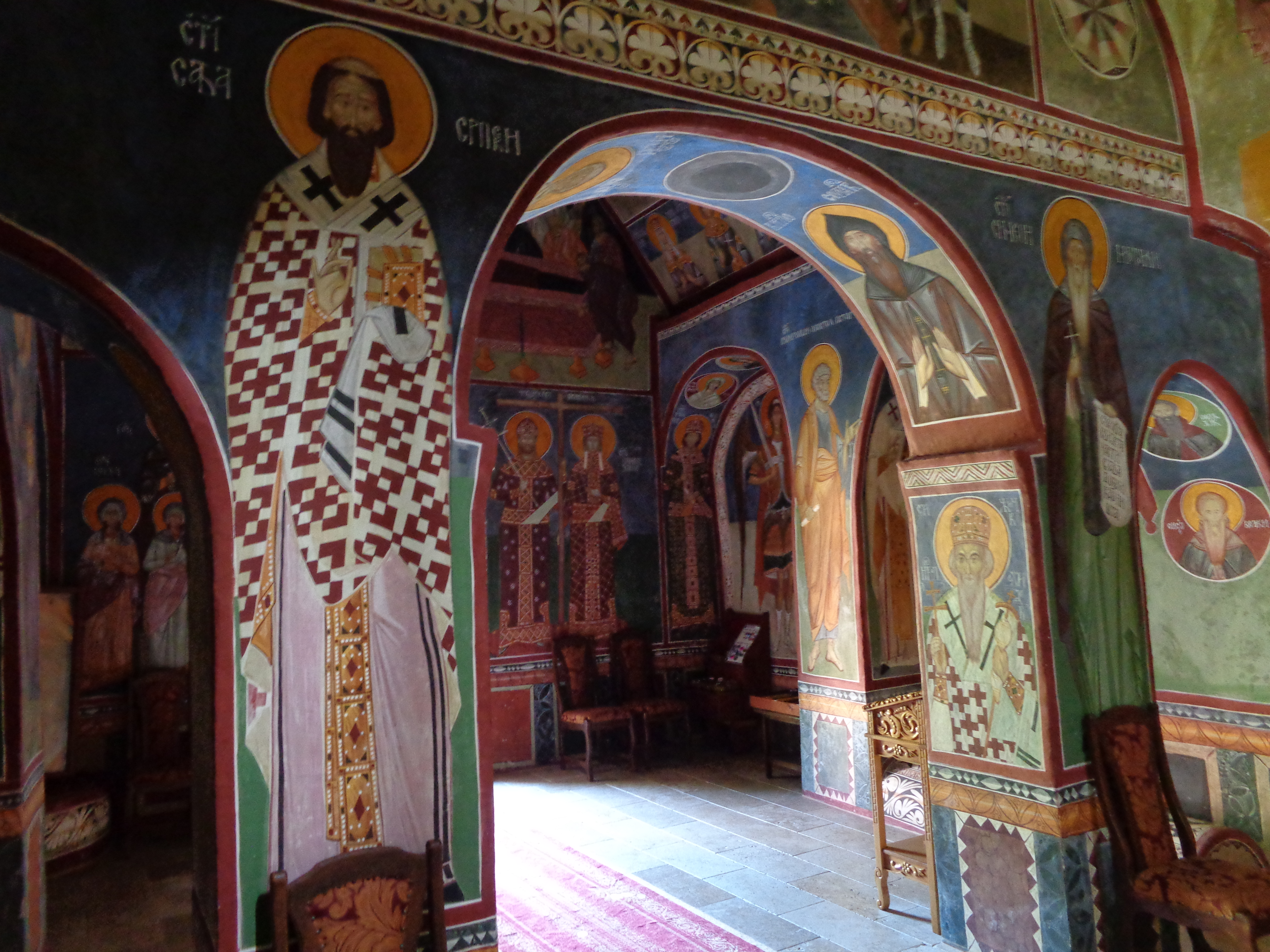

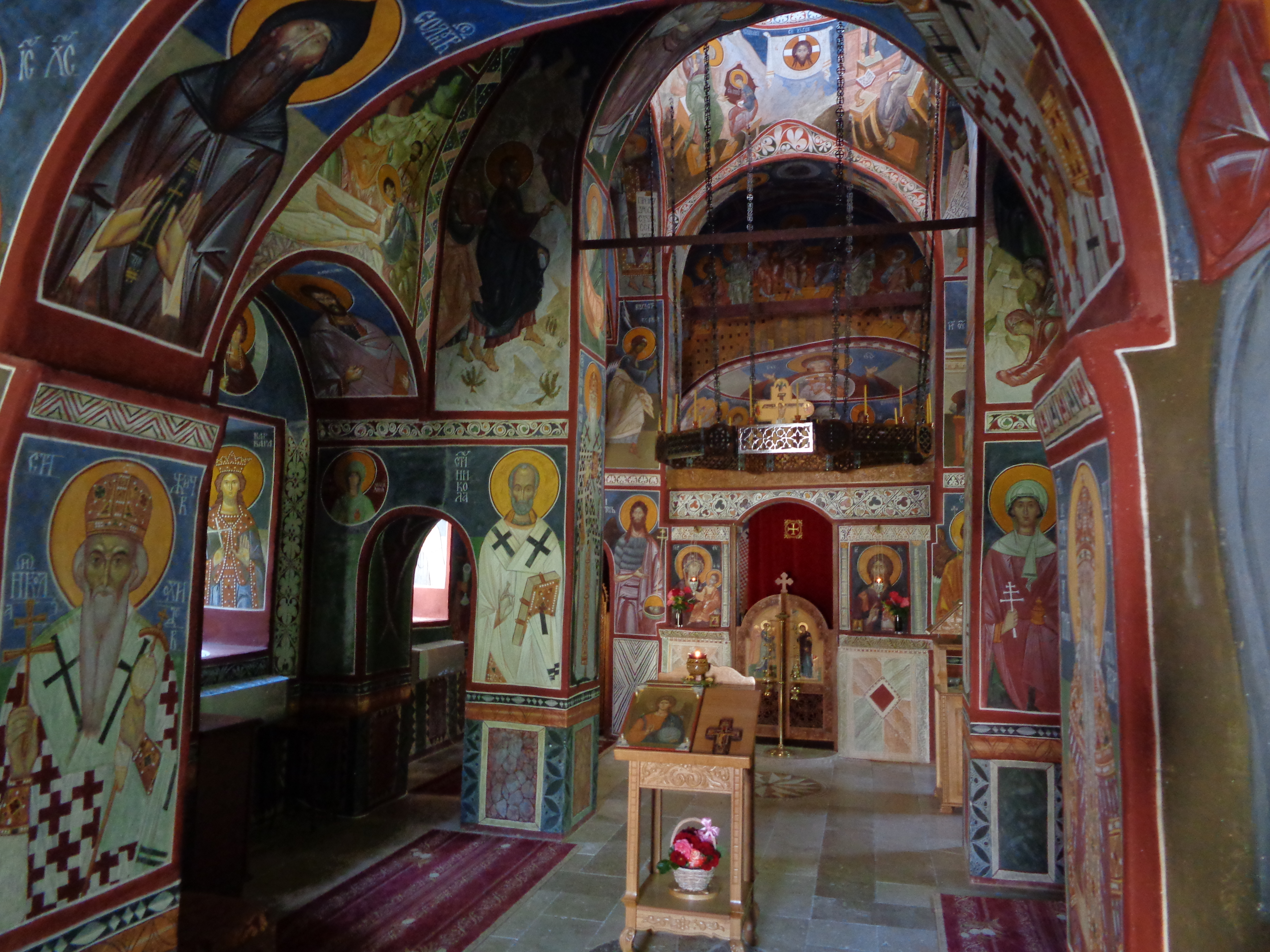

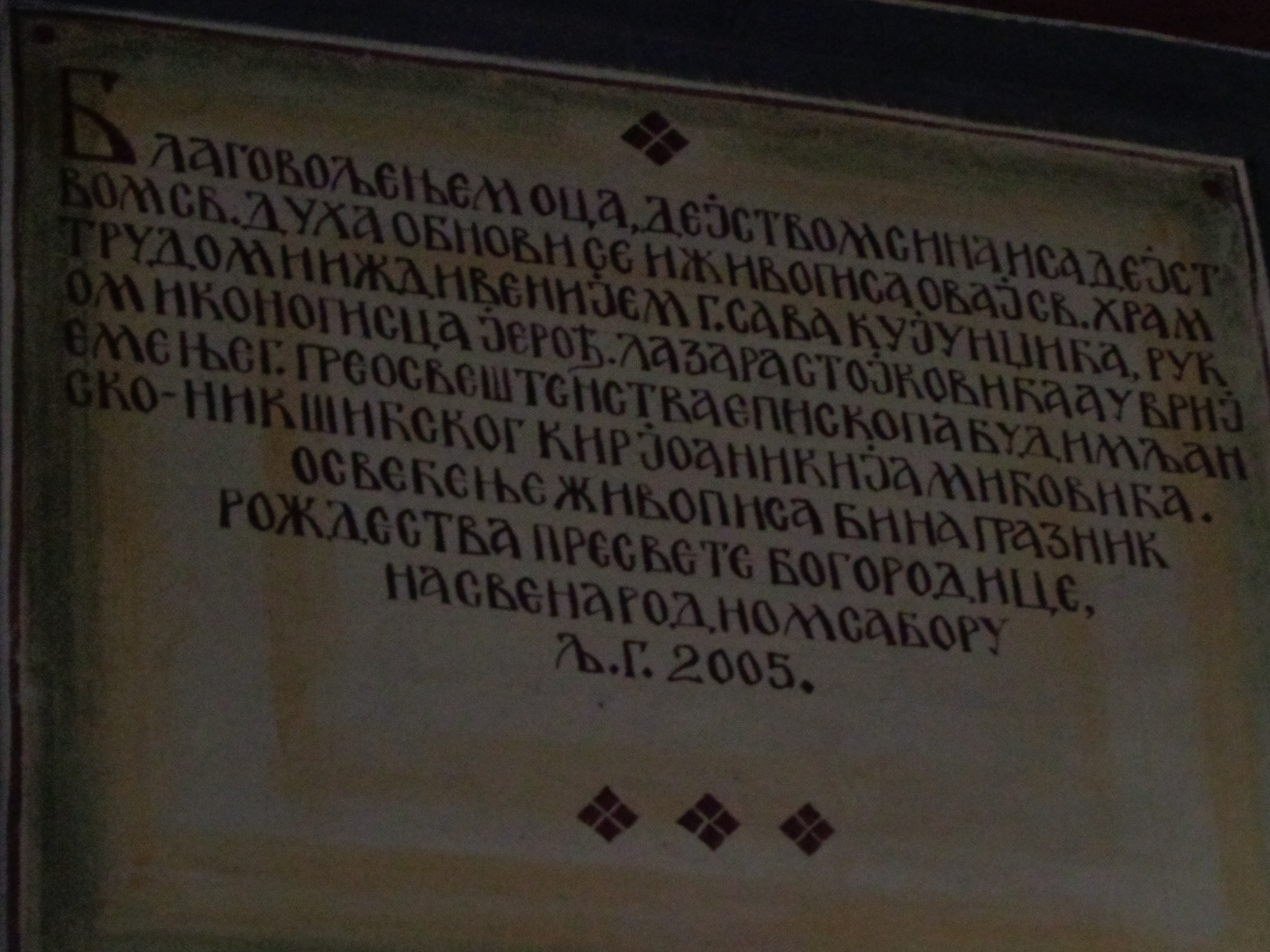

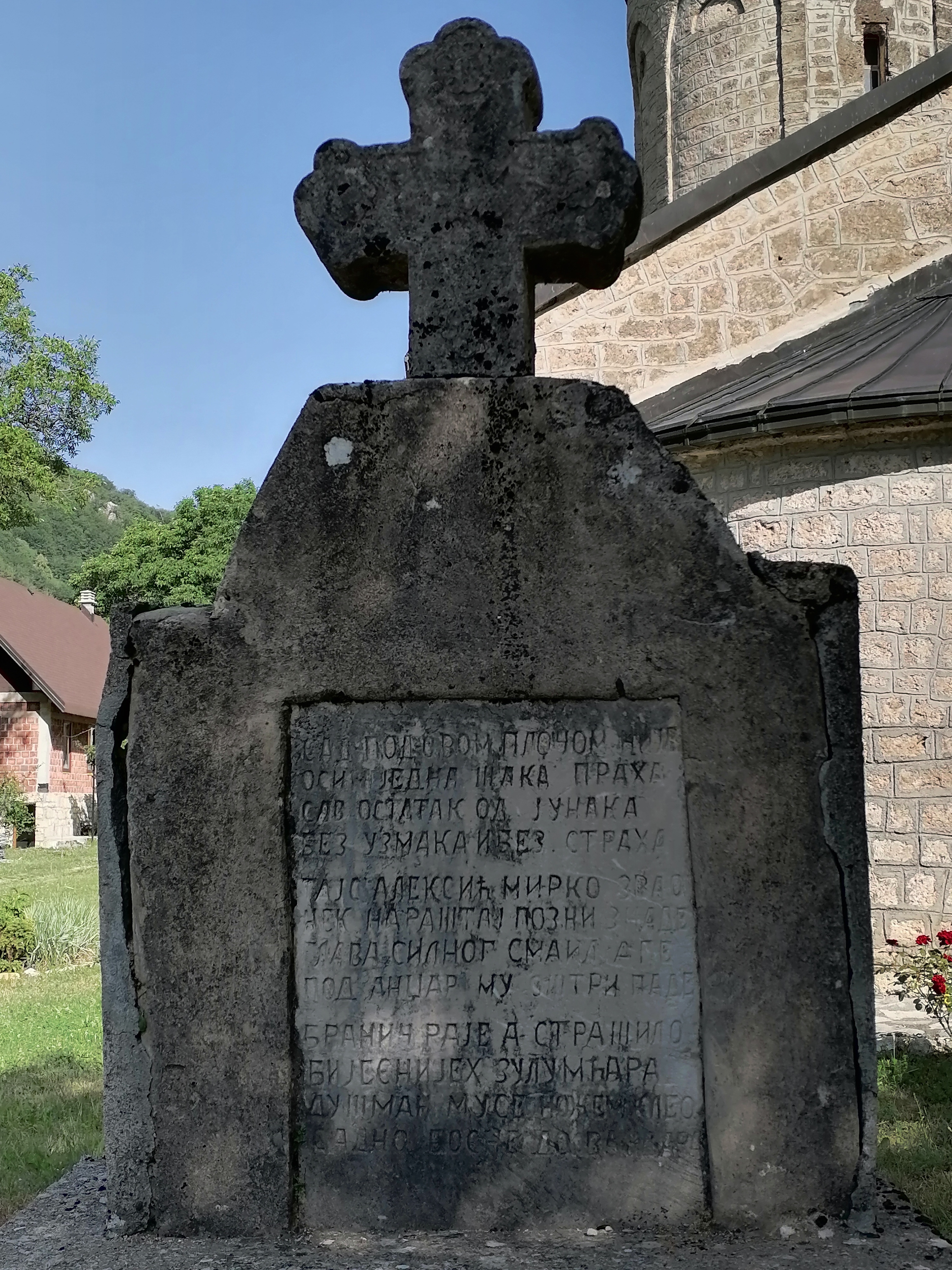

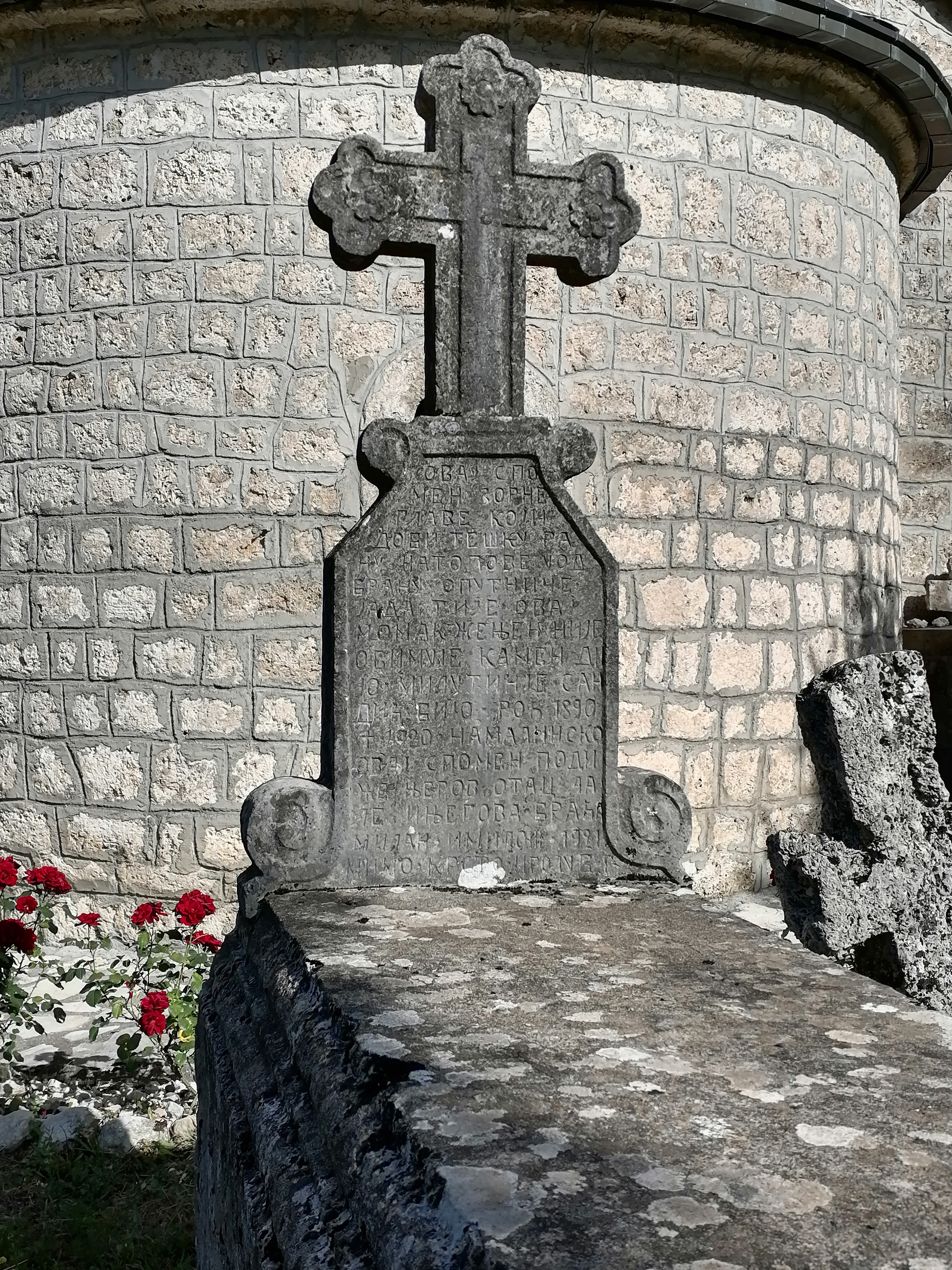

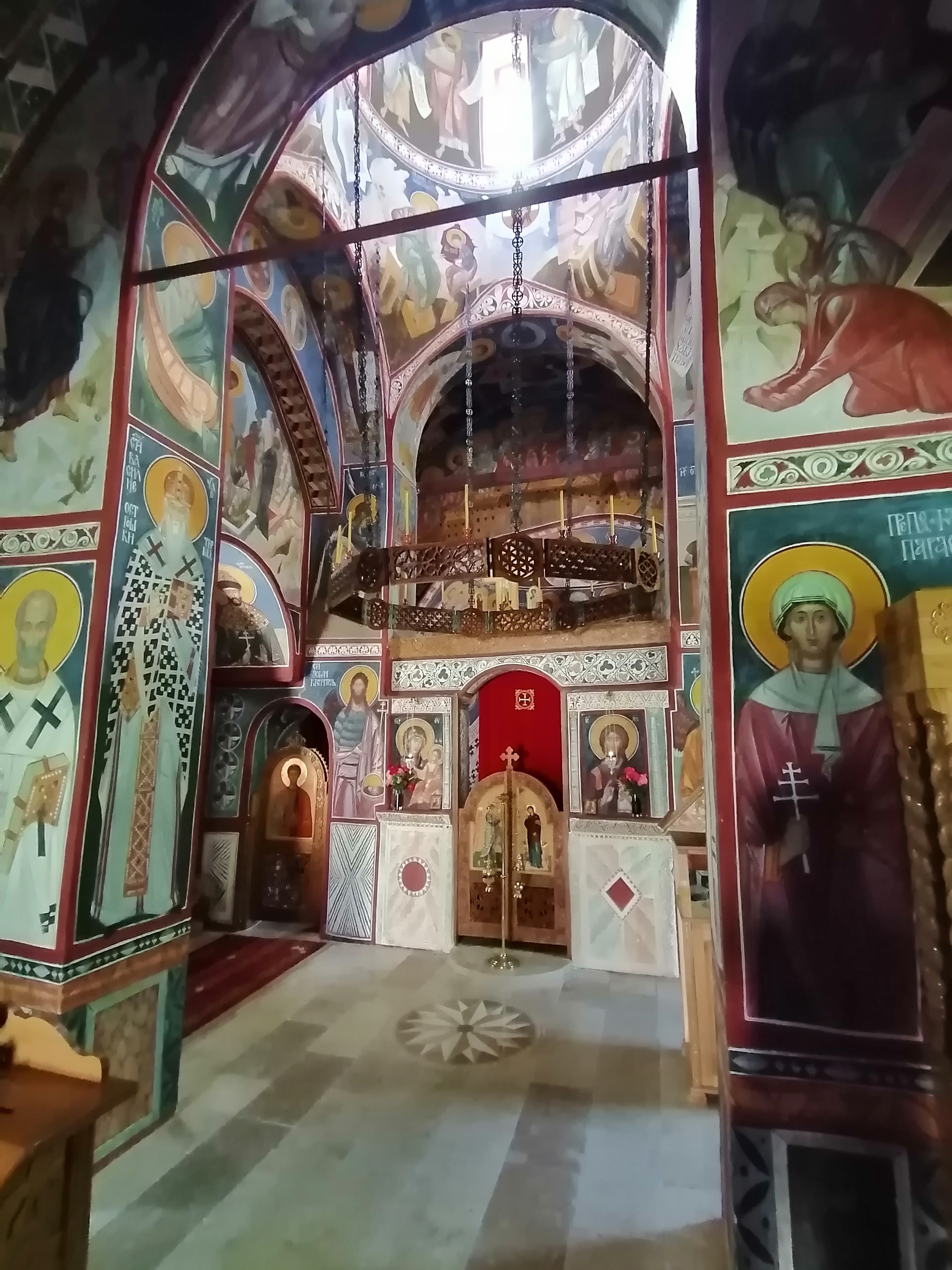

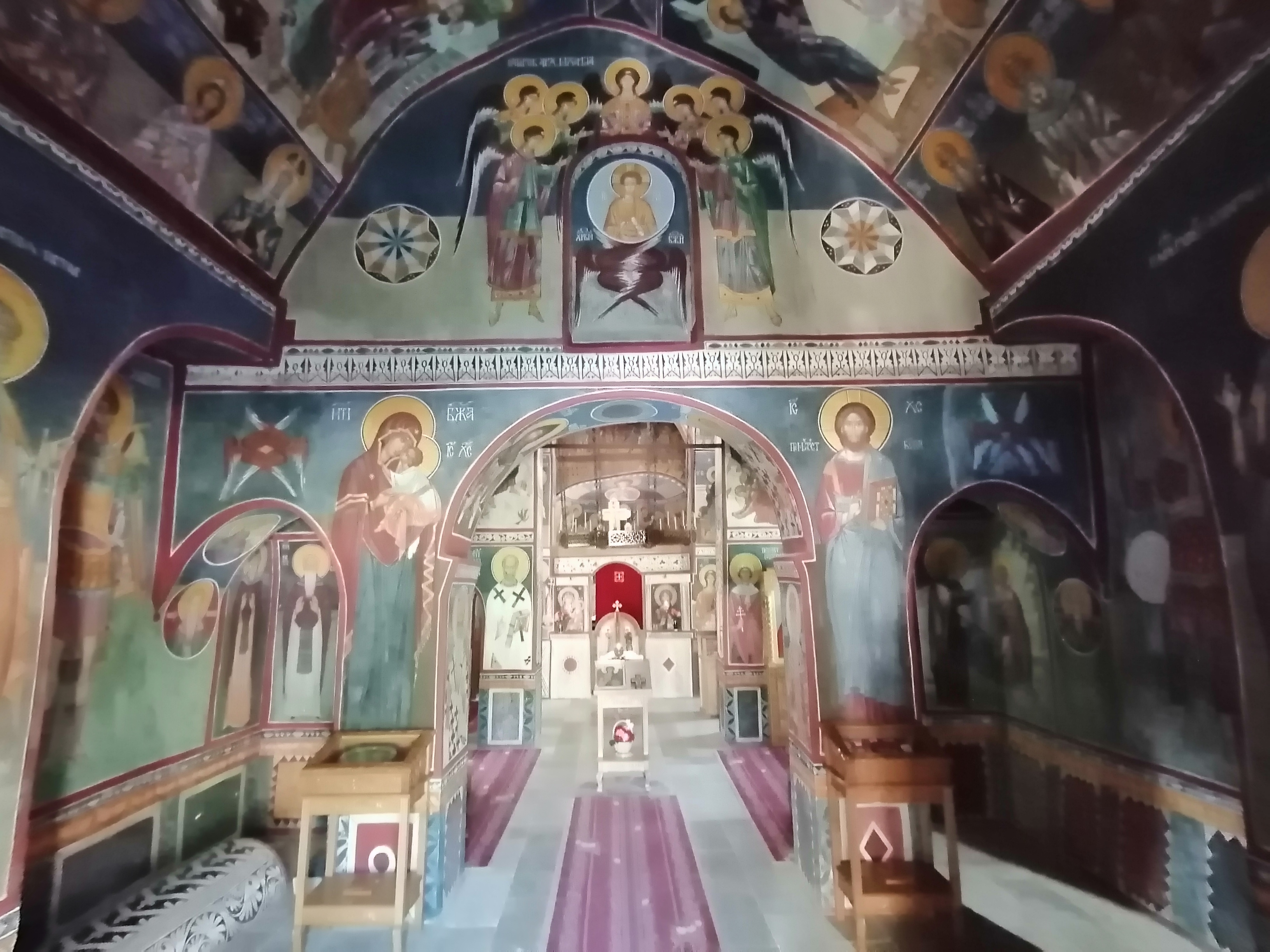

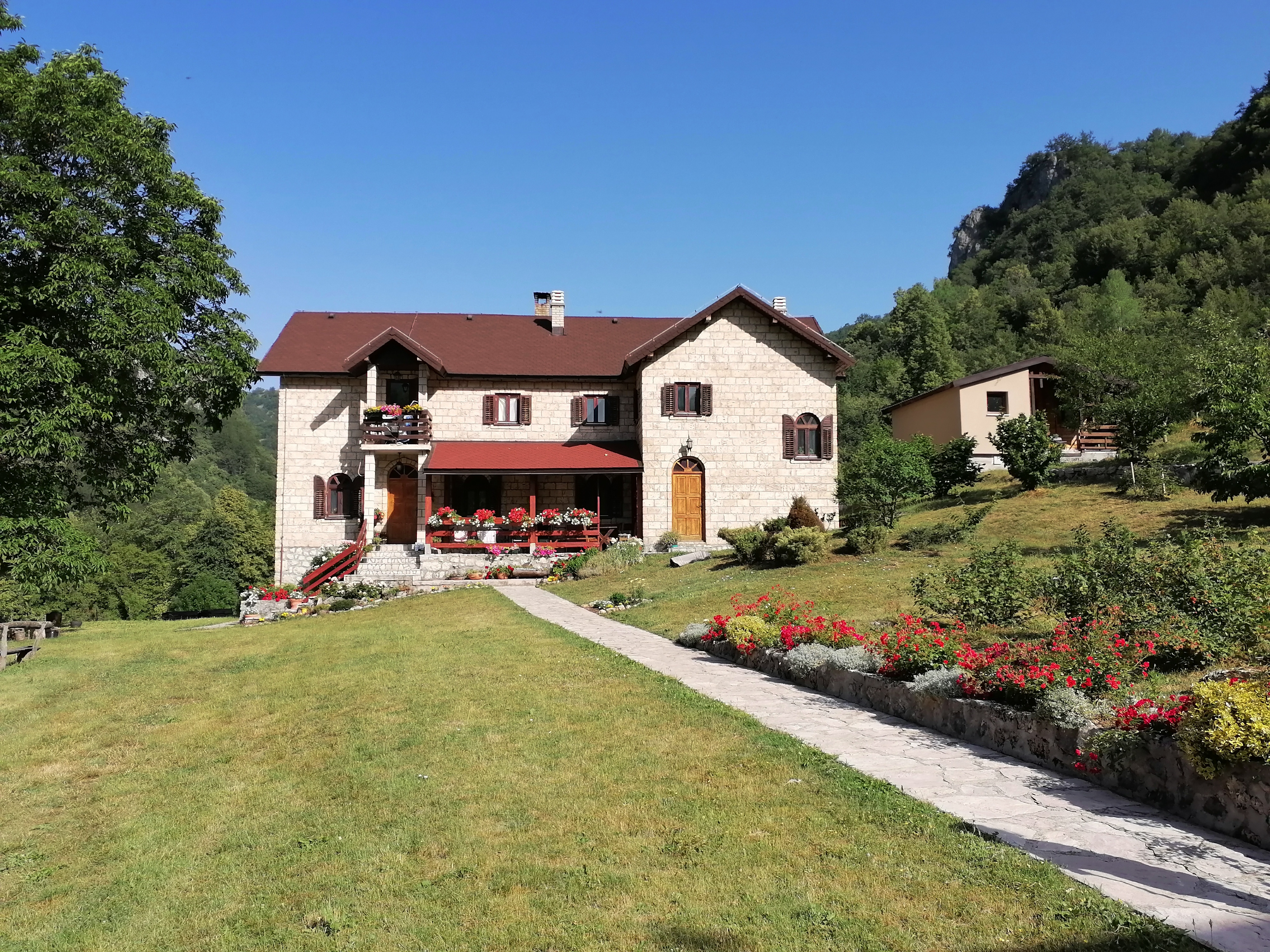

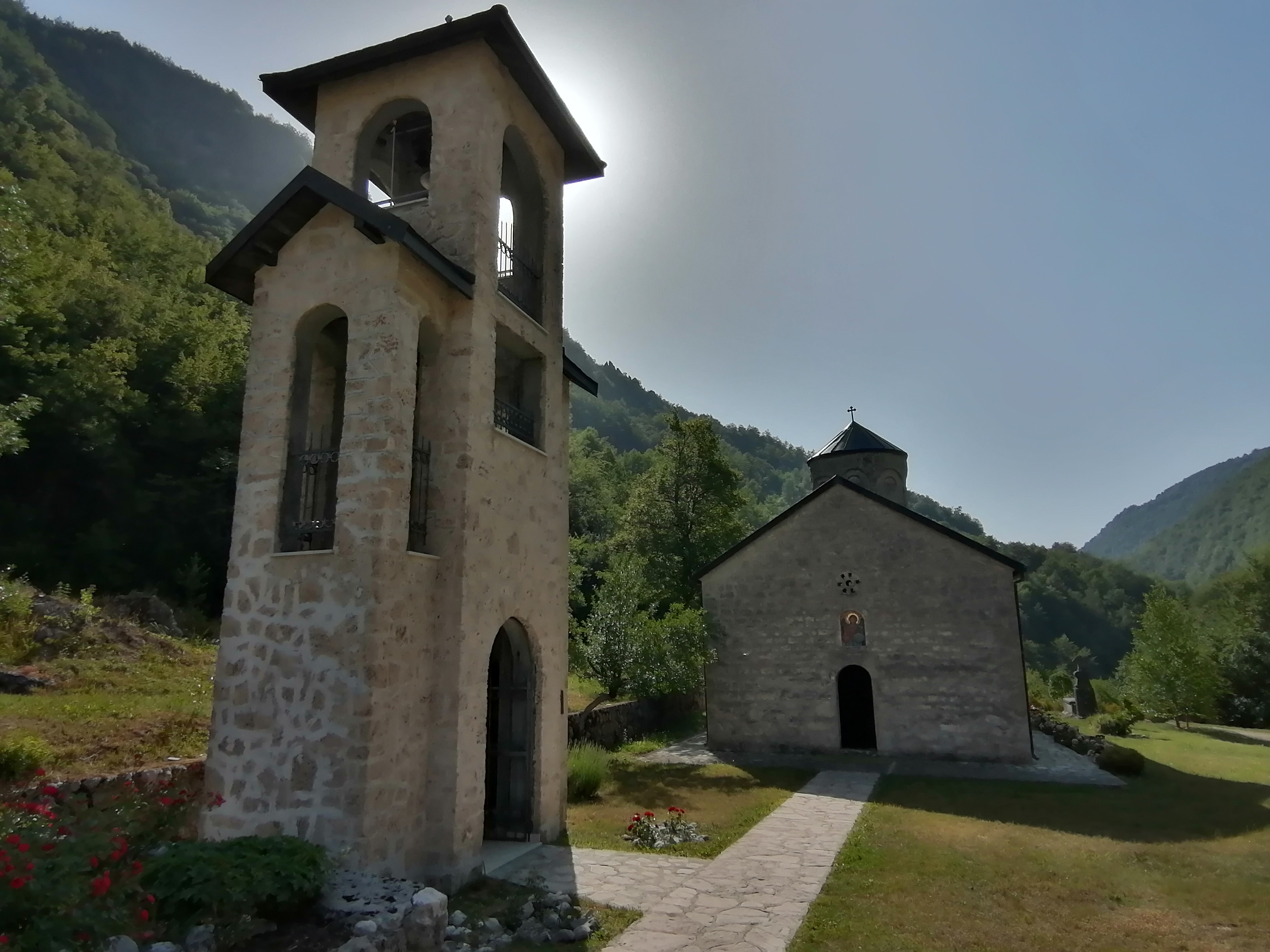

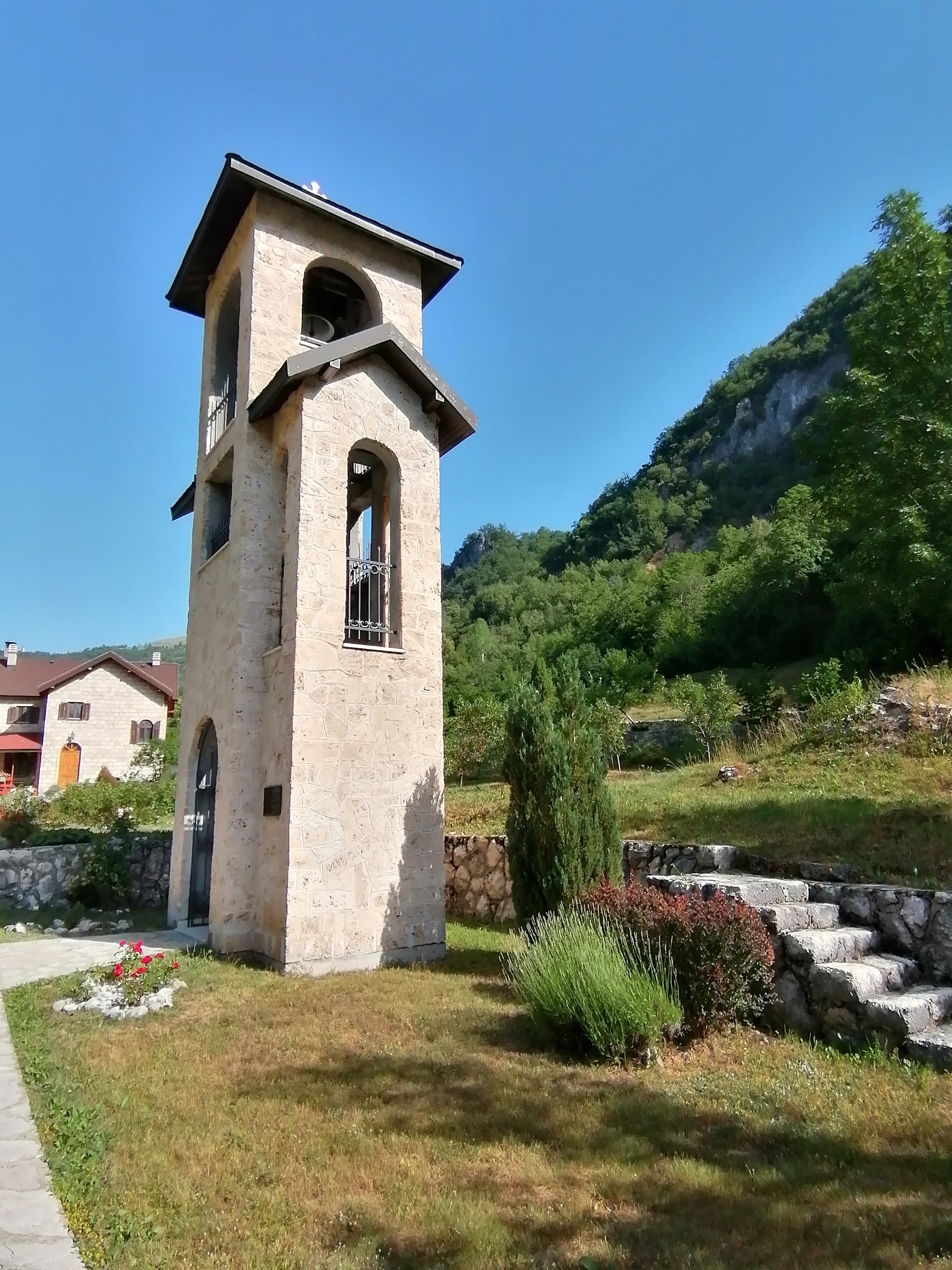

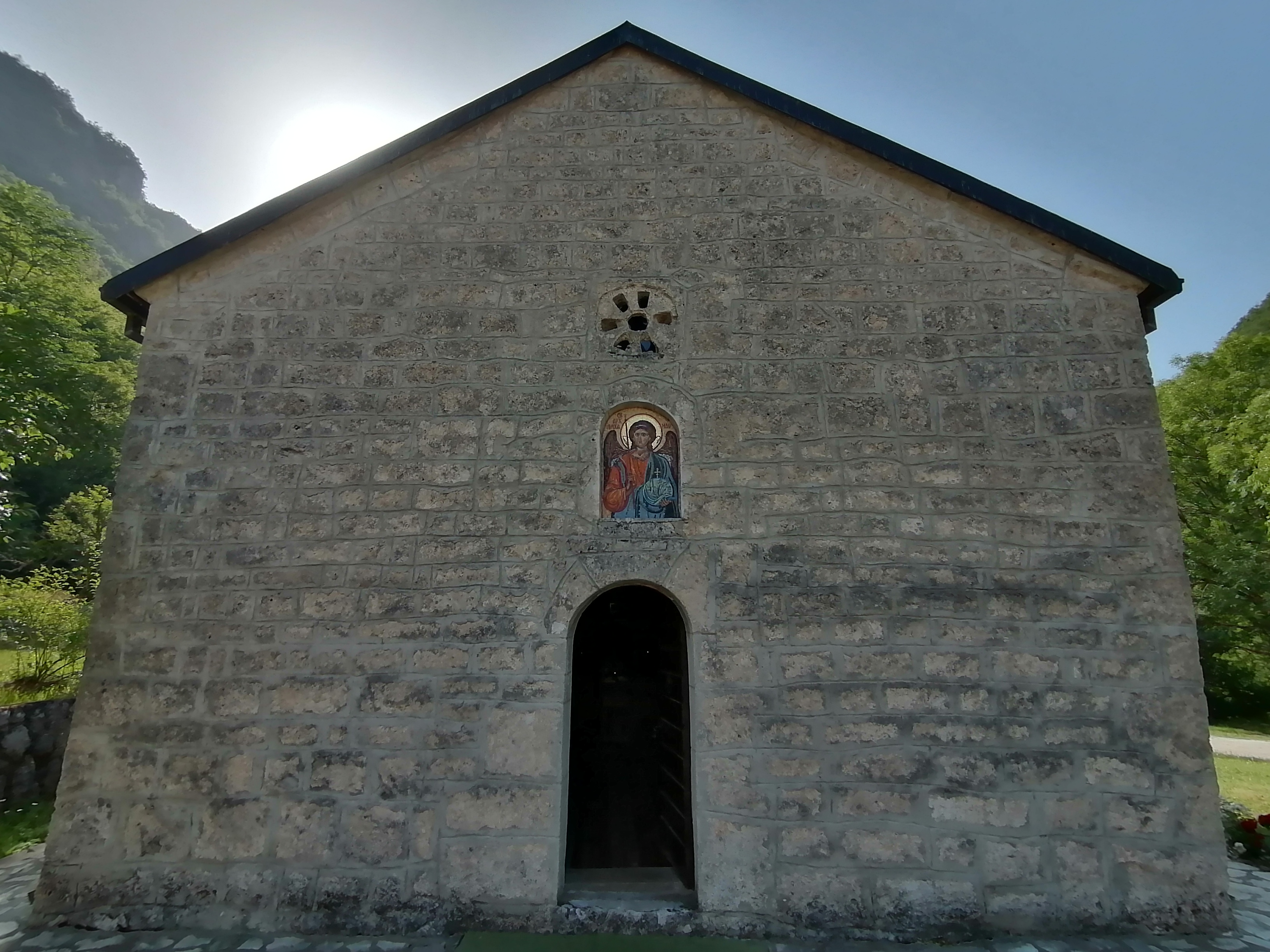

== See also ==
- List of Serb Orthodox monasteries
