= R-20 regional road (Montenegro) =

Road in Montenegro

R-20 regional road
- Regionalni put R-20

Route information
- Length: 37.6 km (23.4 mi)

Major junctions
- North end: M-6 in Virak
- R-21 in Tušina
- South end: M-6 in Šavnik

Location
- Country: Montenegro
- Municipalities: Žabljak, Šavnik

Highway system
- Transport in Montenegro; Motorways
← R-19	→ R-21

R-20 regional road (Montenegrin: Regionalni put R-20) is a Montenegrin roadway.

== History ==
Before building of Šavnik-Žabljak section of M-6 highway, this road was main connection between these two cities.

In January 2016, the Ministry of Transport and Maritime Affairs published bylaw on categorisation of state roads. With new categorisation, R-20 regional road was created from municipal road that connected Tušina and Žabljak, and part of R-18 regional road between Tušina and Šavnik.

== Major intersections ==
Municipality	Location	km	mi	Destinations	Notes
Žabljak	Virak	0.0	0.0	M-6 – Pljevlja, Šavnik	
Šavnik	Tušina	23.3	14.5	R-21 – Kolašin, Podgorica	
Šavnik	Šavnik	37.6	23.4	M-6 – Nikšić, Žabljak	
1.000 mi = 1.609 km; 1.000 km = 0.621 mi
