= R-21 regional road (Montenegro) =

Road in Montenegro

R-21 regional road
- Regionalni put R-21

Route information
- Length: 40 km (25 mi)

Major junctions
- East end: M-2 in Mioska
- West end: R-20 in Tušina

Location
- Country: Montenegro
- Municipalities: Kolašin, Šavnik

Highway system
- Transport in Montenegro; Motorways
← R-20	→ R-22

R-21 regional road (Montenegrin: Regionalni put R-21) is a Montenegrin roadway.

This road serves as the shortest connection between Šavnik and Kolašin.

== History ==
In 1975, a tunnel under the Semolj was started. It would have been 1750 m long, and 420 m were excavated before the work was stopped the same year.

In January 2016, the Ministry of Transport and Maritime Affairs published bylaw on categorisation of state roads. With new categorisation, part of R-18 regional road between Tušina and Mioska was renamed as R-21 regional road.

== Major intersections ==
Municipality	Location	km	mi	Destinations	Notes
Kolašin	Mioska	0.0	0.0	M-2 – Kolašin, Podgorica	
Šavnik	Semolj	25.3	15.7	Mountain pass Semolj 1580 MASL	
Šavnik	Boan	38.9	24.2	No major intersection	
Šavnik	Tušina	40.0	24.9	R-20 – Šavnik, Žabljak	
1.000 mi = 1.609 km; 1.000 km = 0.621 mi
