= Šavnik Municipality =

Šavnik Municipality Opština Šavnik Општина Шавник
- Municipality
- Flag Coat of arms

- Šavnik Municipality in Montenegro
- Country: Montenegro
- Seat: Šavnik

Area
  - Total: 553 km^{2} (214 sq mi)

Population
  - Total: 2,947
  - Density: 5.33/km^{2} (13.8/sq mi)
- Postal code: 81450
- Area code: +382 40
- ISO 3166 code: ME-18
- Car plates: ŠN
- Climate: Cfb
- Website: www.savnik.me

Šavnik Municipality (Montenegrin: Opština Šavnik / Општина Шавник) is one of the municipalities of Montenegro. The municipality is located in Northern Montenegro. The administrative center is the small town of Šavnik.

== Geography and location ==
Šavnik is located at the confluence of three rivers — Bukovica, Bijela and Šavnik, at an altitude of 840 meters. The municipality is located in the northwestern region of Montenegro, in the Drobnjaci region, named after the local clan of Drobnjaci. The population of the town and municipality of Šavnik has since been in a slow, but steady decline. Most of the residents have been migrating to Nikšić and southern Montenegro, and Šavnik is often a synonym for a poor and deteriorating town. Šavnik is situated on the regional road between Nikšić (45 km) and Žabljak (15 km), and it is its only link to the rest of Montenegro.

== Municipal parliament ==
The municipal parliament consists of 30 deputies elected directly for a four-year term.

Party / Coalition	Seats	Local government
DPS – SD	19 / 30	Government
DF – SNP	8 / 30	Opposition
DCG – DEMOS	3 / 30	Opposition

== Population ==
The town of Šavnik is the administrative centre of the Šavnik municipality, which has 1,569 residents. The town of Šavnik itself has a population of 364. Šavnik municipality has the smallest population of all municipalities of Montenegro. The town of Šavnik is also the seat of municipality in Montenegro with fewest residents.

Ethnic groups (2023 census):
- Montenegrins (50,54%)
- Serbs (46,85%)

== Gallery ==
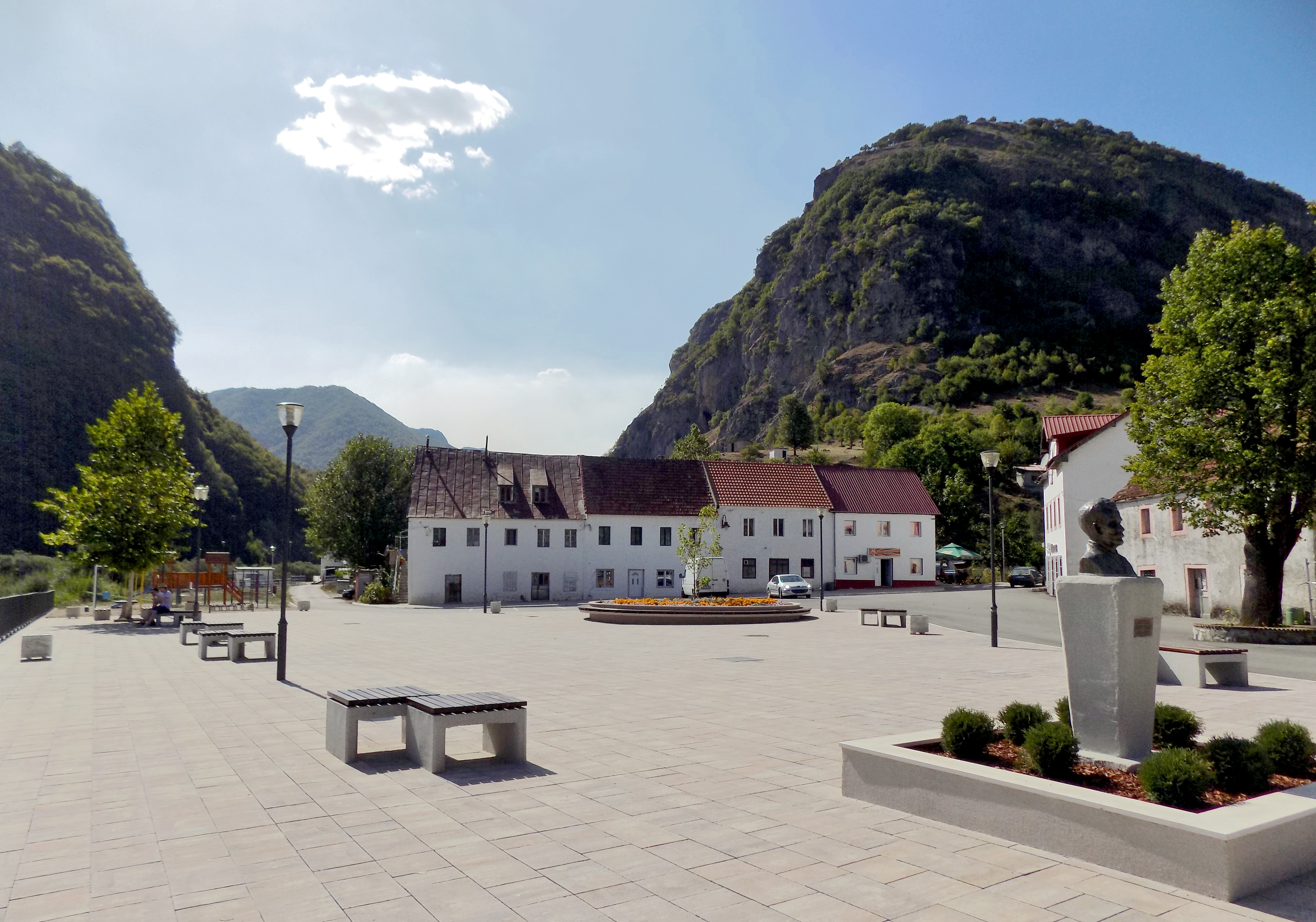
Town of Šavnik

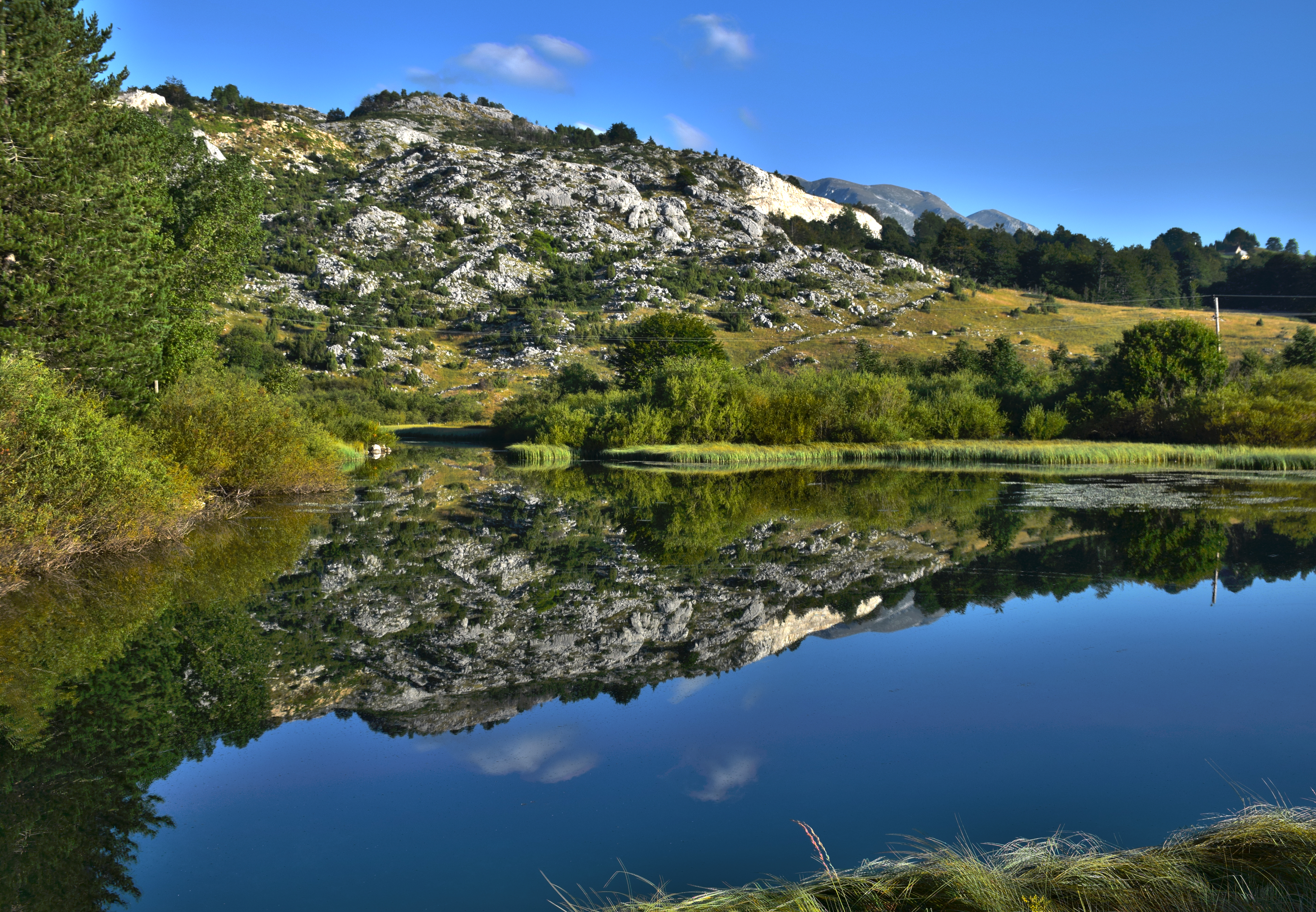
Bukovica river

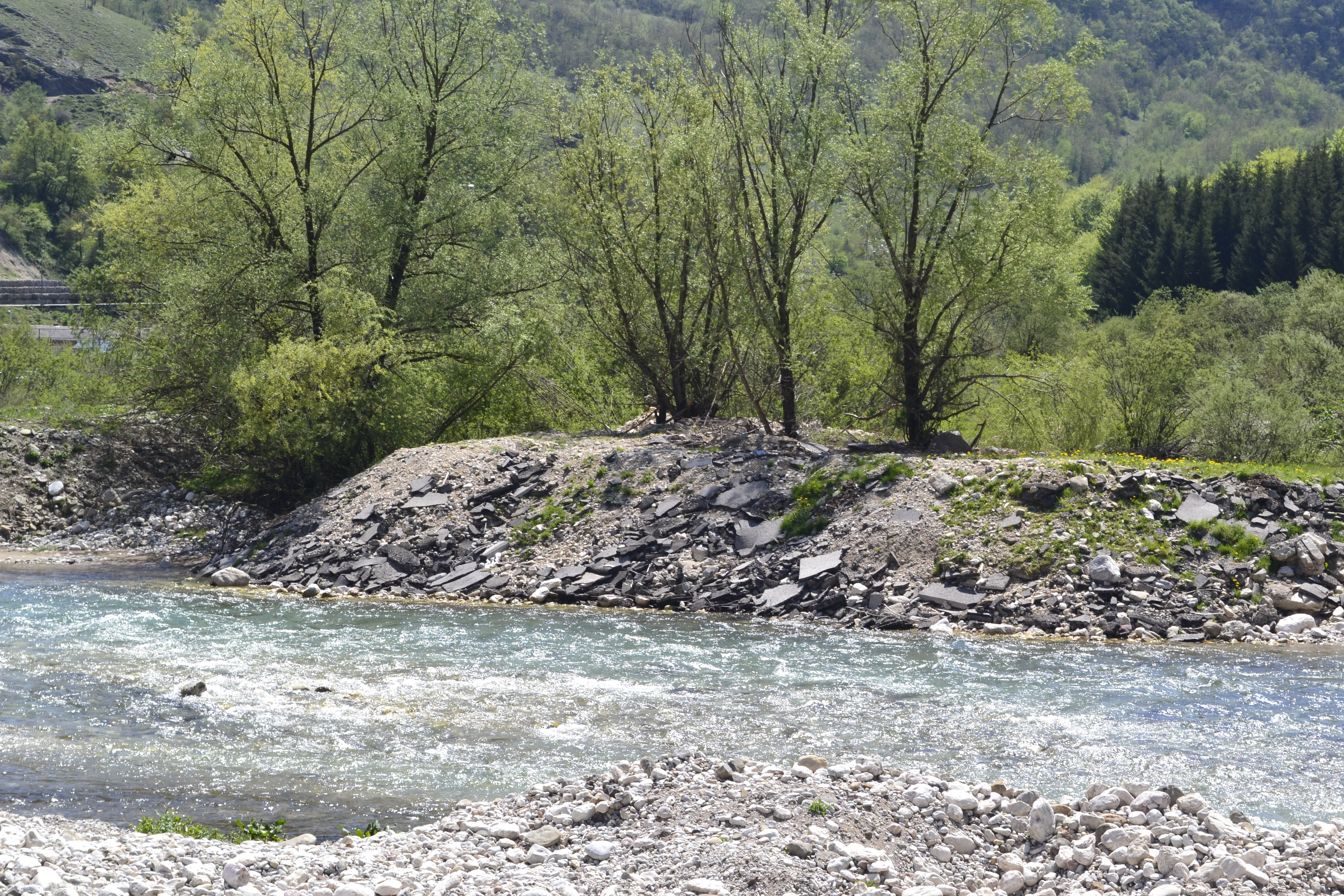
Šavnik river

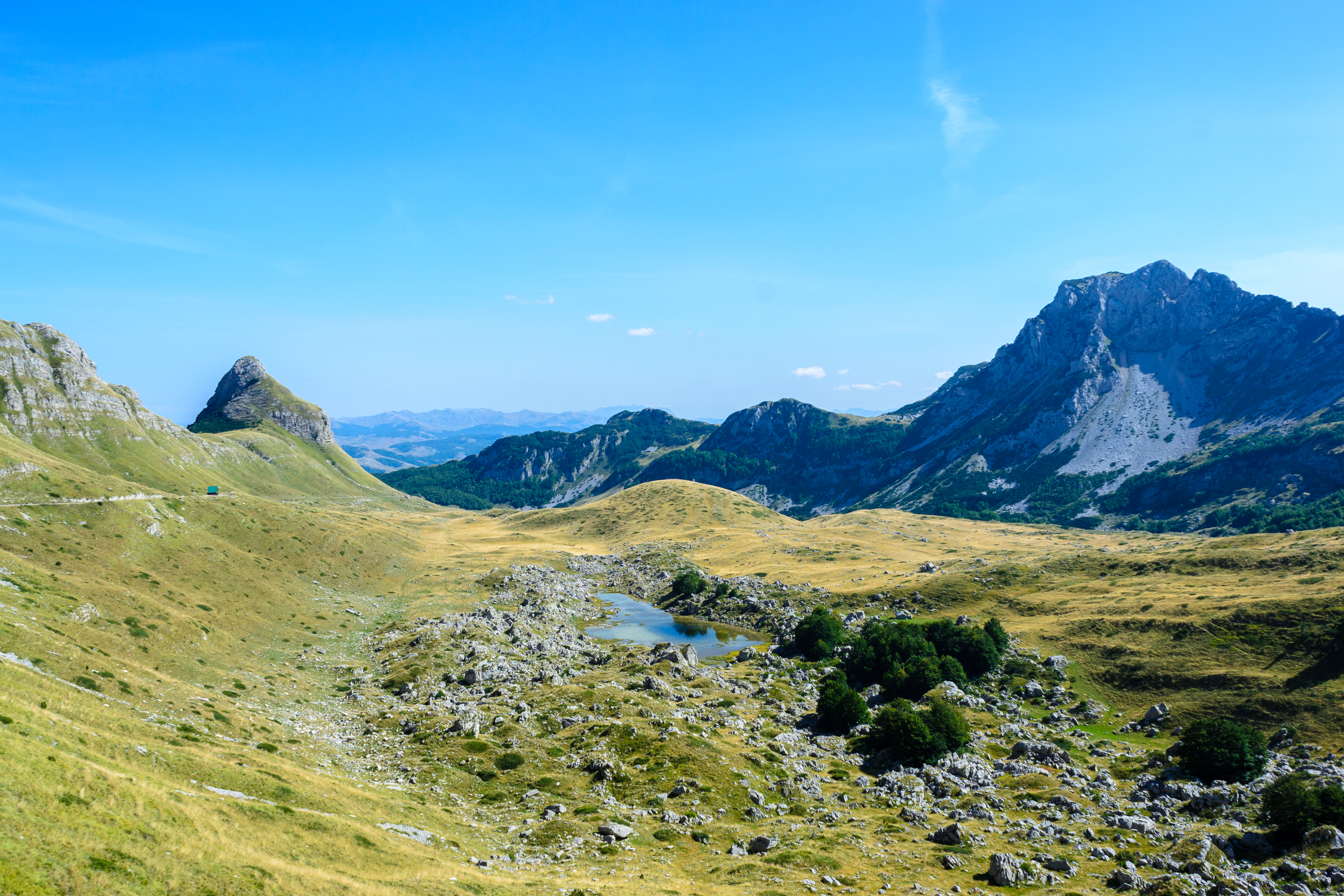
Durmitor
