= Tušina =

Location
- Country: Montenegro

Physical characteristics
- Source
  - coordinates: 42.91558°N 19.29530°E
- Mouth
  - location: Bukovica
  - coordinates: 42.9503°N 19.1686°E

Basin features
- Progression: Bukovica→ Komarnica→ Piva→ Drina→ Sava→ Danube→ Black Sea

The Tušina (Serbian Cyrillic: Тушина) is one of the five rivers in the municipality of Šavnik, Montenegro. It is made of many streams that meet under Somina and Krnja Jela mountains. It is 10 km long. It is one of the tributaries of the Bukovica.
