= Šavnik (river) =

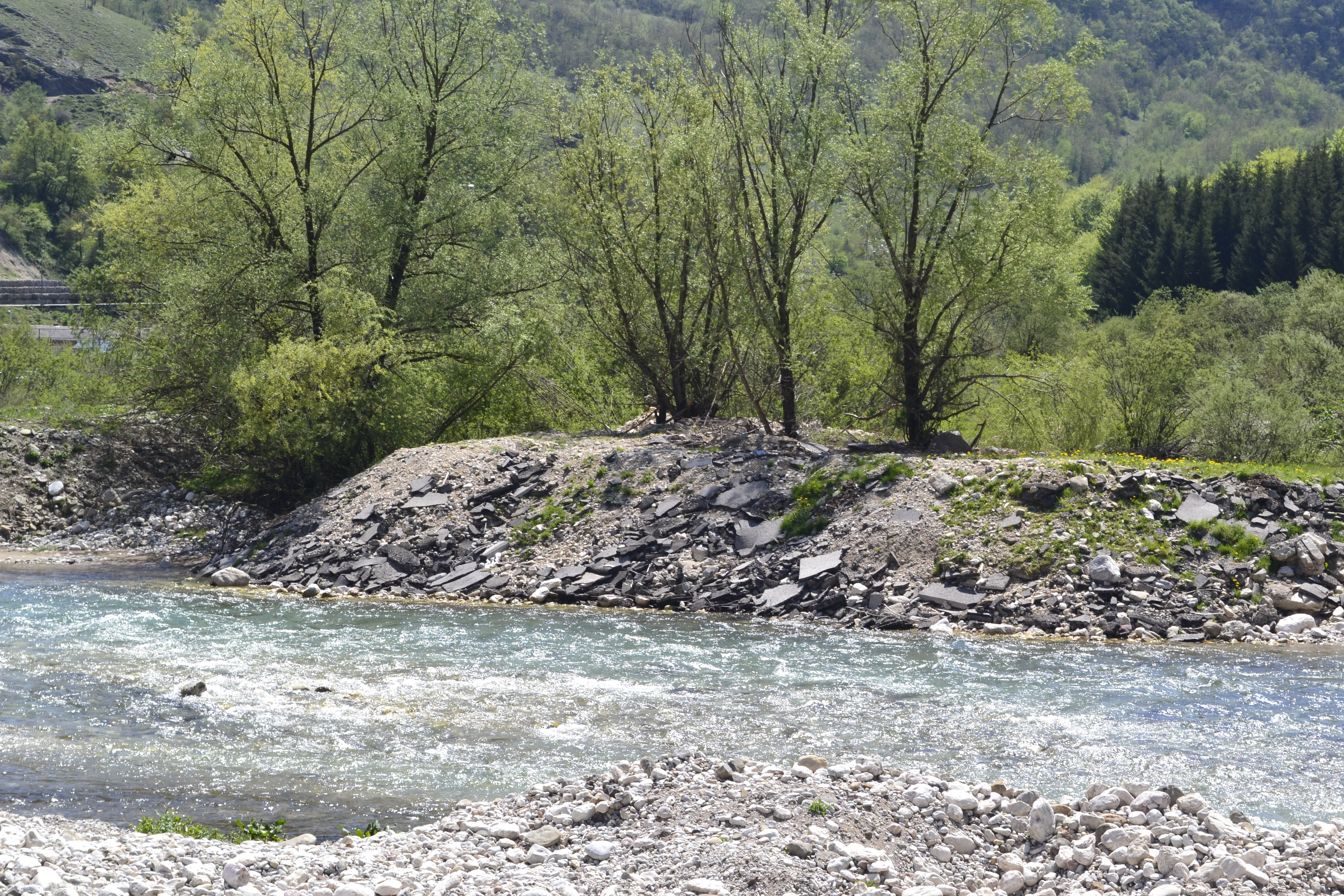

Location
- Country: Montenegro

Physical characteristics
- Mouth
  - location: Bukovica
  - coordinates: 42.9563°N 19.0935°E

Basin features
- Progression: Bukovica→ Komarnica→ Piva→ Drina→ Sava→ Danube→ Black Sea

The Šavnik (Montenegrin Cyrillic: Шавник, pronounced [ʃǎv̞niːk]) is a river in Montenegro. It originates in northern Montenegro below Mount Pogledina. It is 1.5 km (0.93 mi) long and has one small power station.

Flowing through the town of Šavnik, it is one of the tributaries of the Bukovica within the Black Sea drainage basin.
