= Šavnik =

Town and municipality in Northern Montenegro

Šavnik Шавник
- Town and municipality
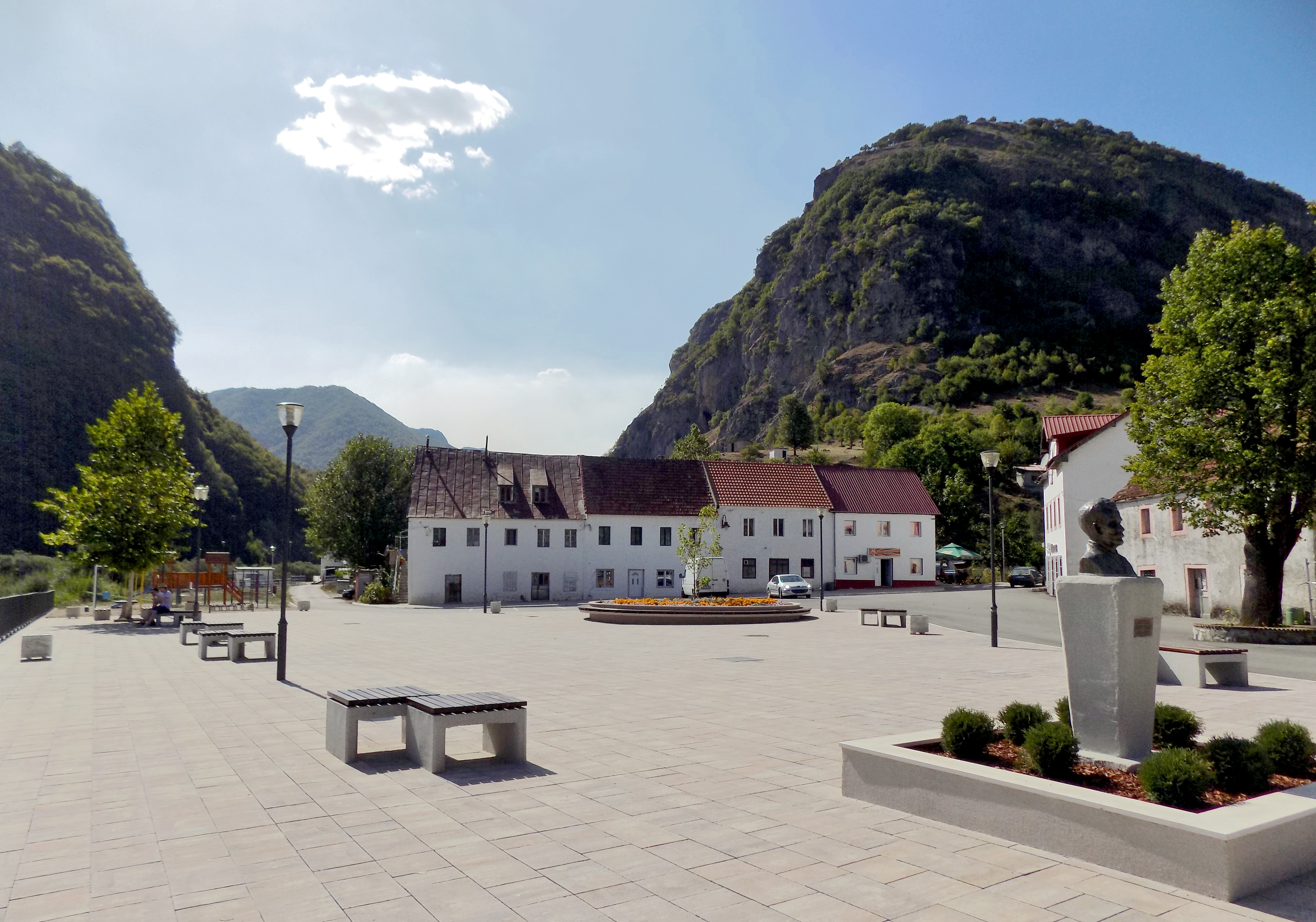
- Main town square in Šavnik

- Flag Coat of arms

- Location within Montenegro
- Coordinates: 42.95°N 19.10°E
- Country: Montenegro
- Region: Northern
- Municipality: Šavnik
- Established: 1861
- Settlements: 27

Government
  - Type: Mayor-Assembly
  - Mayor: Jugoslav Jakić (DPS)

Area
  - Town and municipality: 553 km^{2} (214 sq mi)

Population (2023 census)
  - Density: 5.3/km^{2} (14/sq mi)
  - Urban: 364 ▼
  - Rural: 1,224 ▼
  - Municipality: 1,588 ▼
- Time zone: UTC+1 (CET)
  - Summer (DST): UTC+2 (CEST)
- Postal code: 81450
- Area code: +382 40
- ISO 3166-2 code: ME-18
- Car plates: ŠN
- Climate: Cfb
- Website: www.savnik.me

Šavnik (Cyrillic: Шавник, pronounced [ʃǎv̞niːk]) is a town in Montenegro in the northern region and administrative center of the Šavnik Municipality. It is located at the confluence of three rivers - the Bukovica, Bijela and Šavnik, at an altitude of 840 meters. It is the lowest lying settlement in the municipality.

== History ==
Unlike most settlements in the area, which date back several centuries, Šavnik is relatively new, founded only in 1861. It was populated by migrants from other parts of Montenegro and Herzegovina, mostly craftsmen, merchants, riflers and blacksmiths, which were needed by local farmers. The area was overgrown with willows, which the newly formed town was named after (šavice – willow branches or seams, which were used as a roof covering).

Before the construction of first houses on the site of today's town, there were two mills on Šavnik River. The first three houses that were built in Šavnik were a tavern with a shop, rifle repair shop and a blacksmith shop. The town quickly became a center for the Drobnjaci region, and incorporated a post office, school, primary court, and military post.

Industrialization during the SFR Yugoslavia era mostly bypassed Šavnik, so did all major transit road or rail links, and the economy of the town went into stagnation. Population of Šavnik and the entire municipality has since been in slow but steady decline. Most of the residents are migrating to Nikšić and southern Montenegro, and Šavnik is often a synonym for a poor and deteriorating town. The new road Risan - Nikšić - Šavnik - Žabljak (P5), and proximity of Žabljak as a main mountain tourist resort in Montenegro may boost Šavnik's economic prospects.

== Population ==
Šavnik is the administrative centre of Šavnik municipality, which in 2023 had a population of 1,588. The town of Šavnik itself has 364 residents.

Population of Šavnik:

- 1981 - 633
- 1991 - 821
- 2003 - 571
- 2011 - 472
- 2023 - 364

Ethnic groups (2003 census):

- Montenegrins – ~59%
- Serbs – ~30%
- Others – ~11%

== Transport ==
Šavnik is situated on a regional road between Nikšić (45 km) and Žabljak (15 km), and it is its only link with the rest of Montenegro.

== Gallery ==
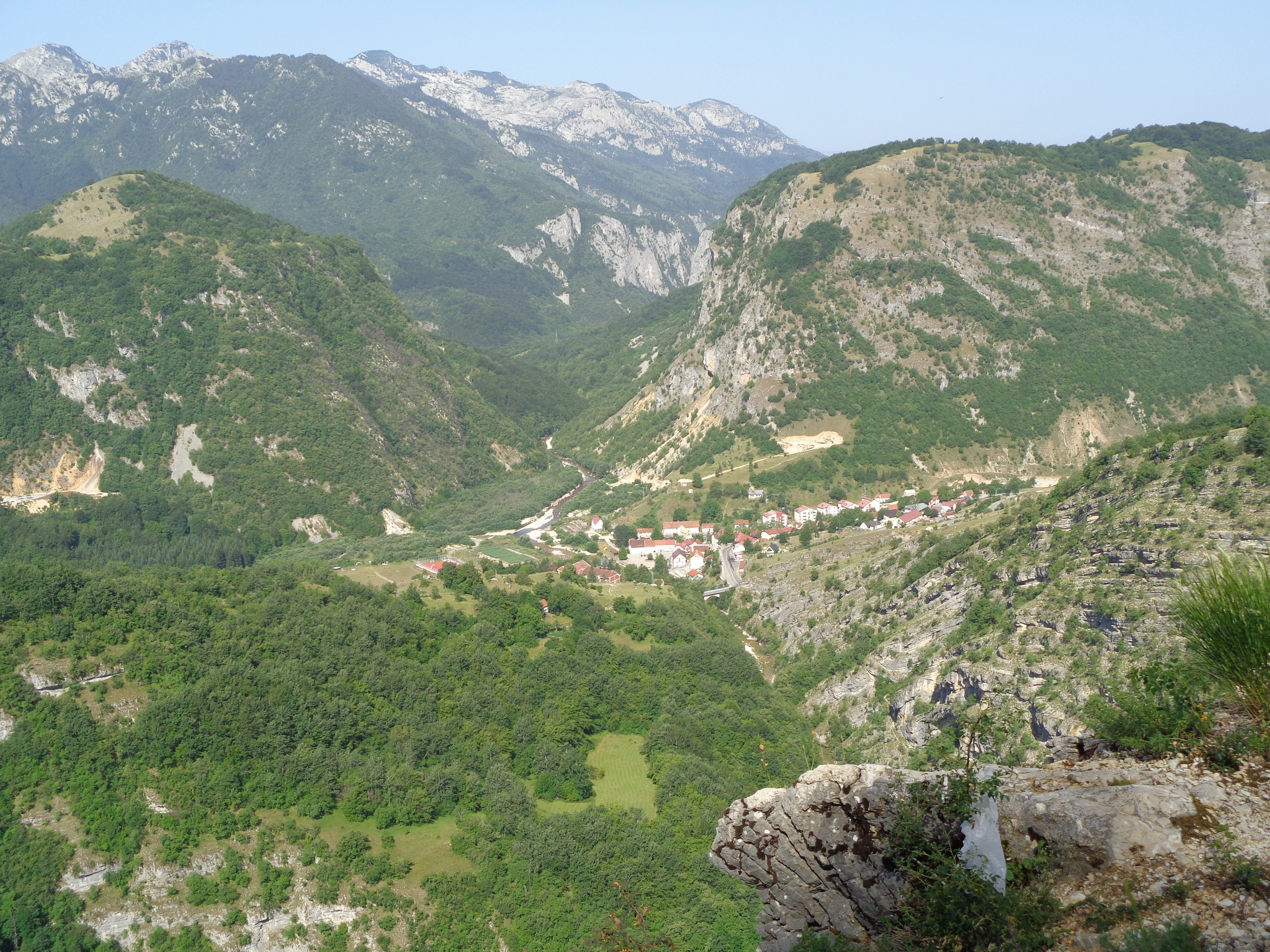

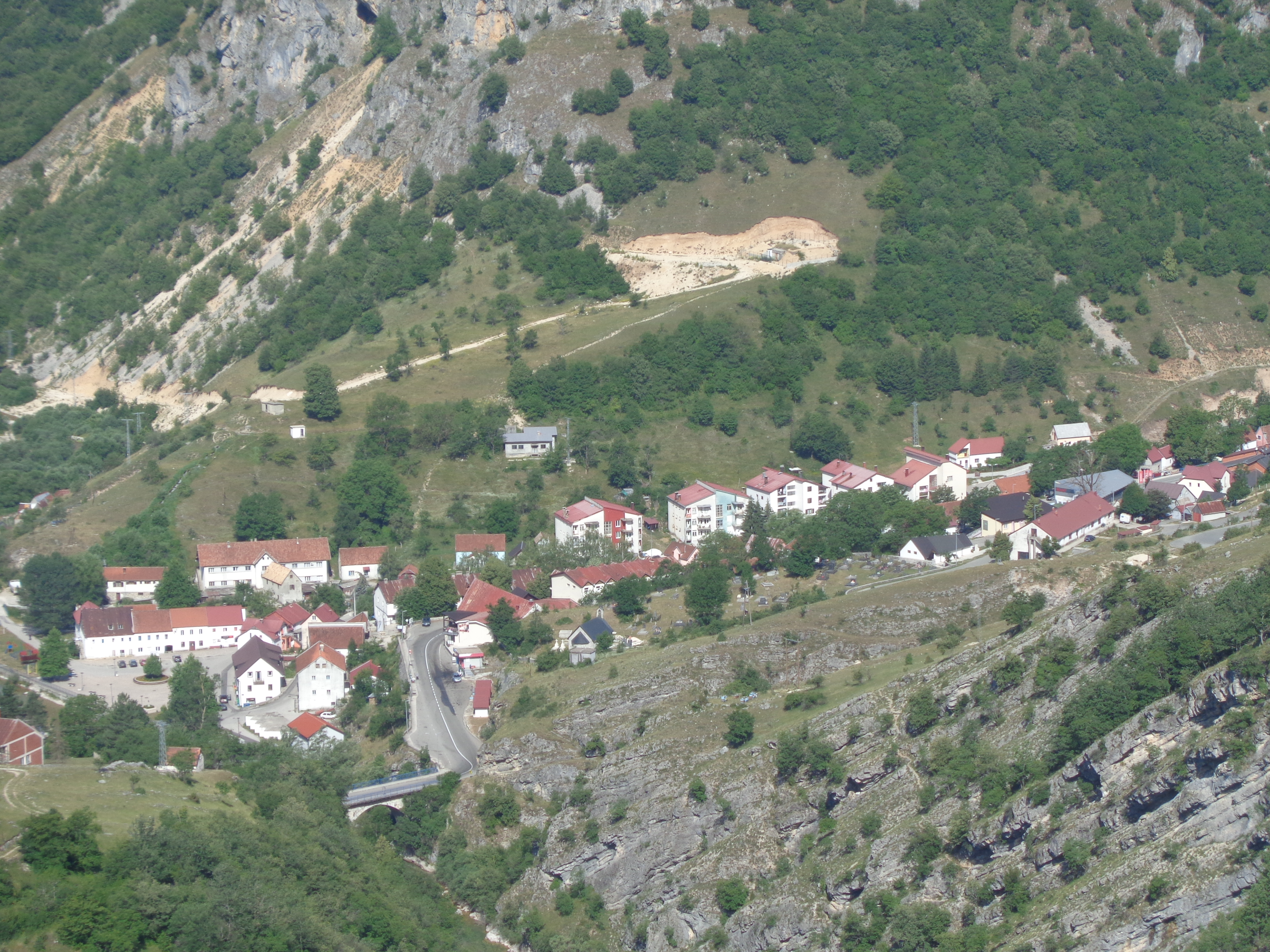

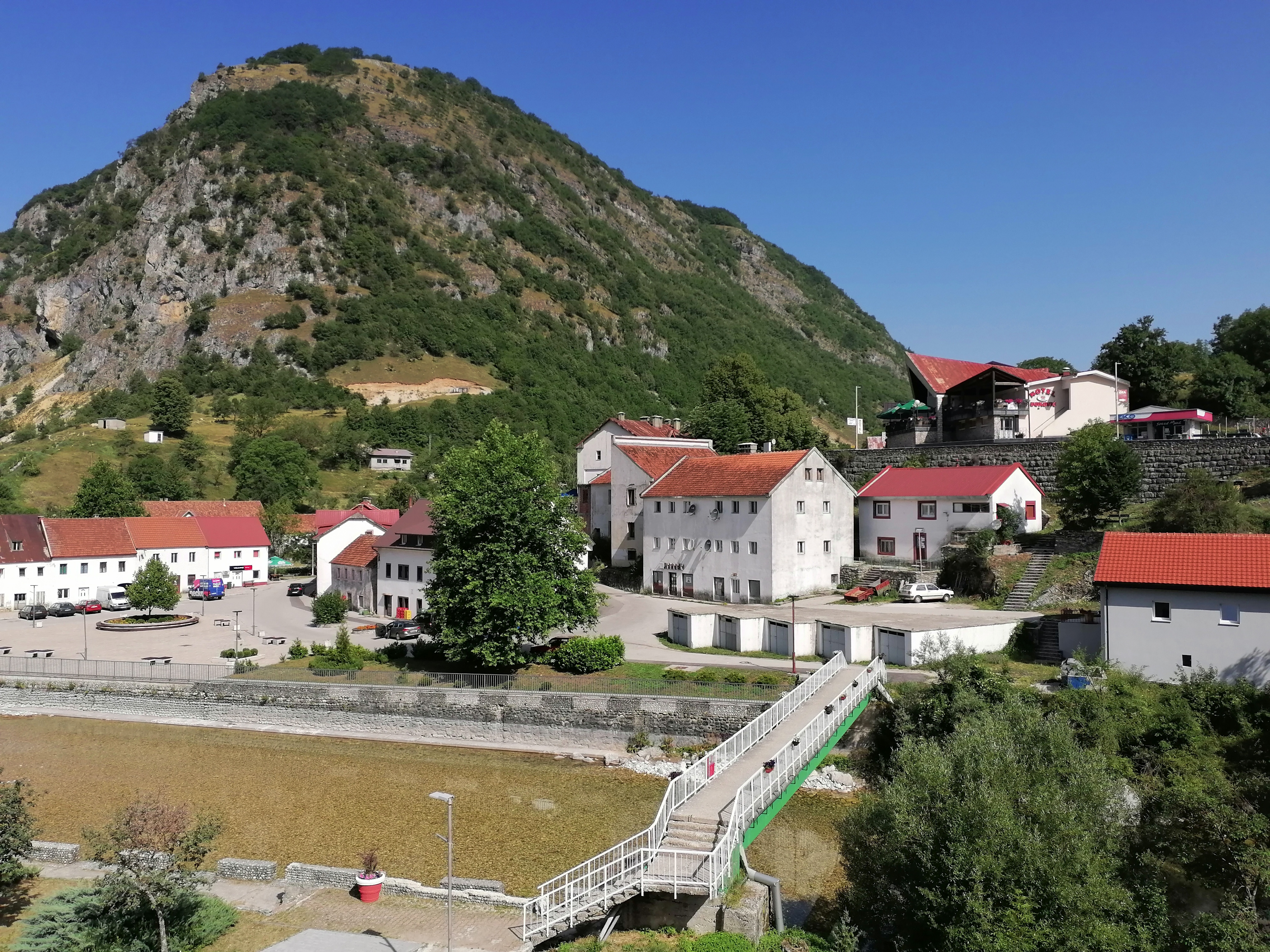

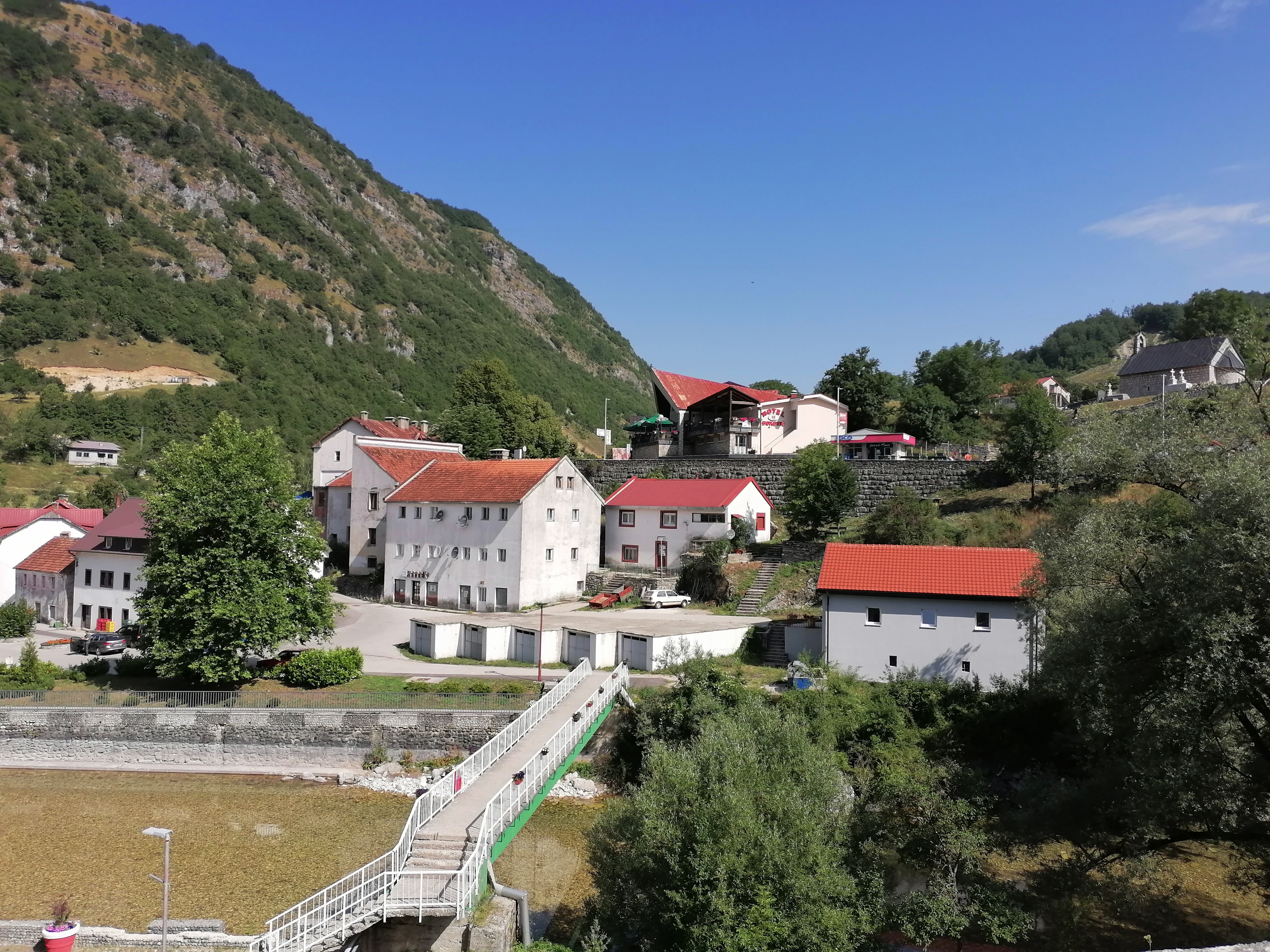

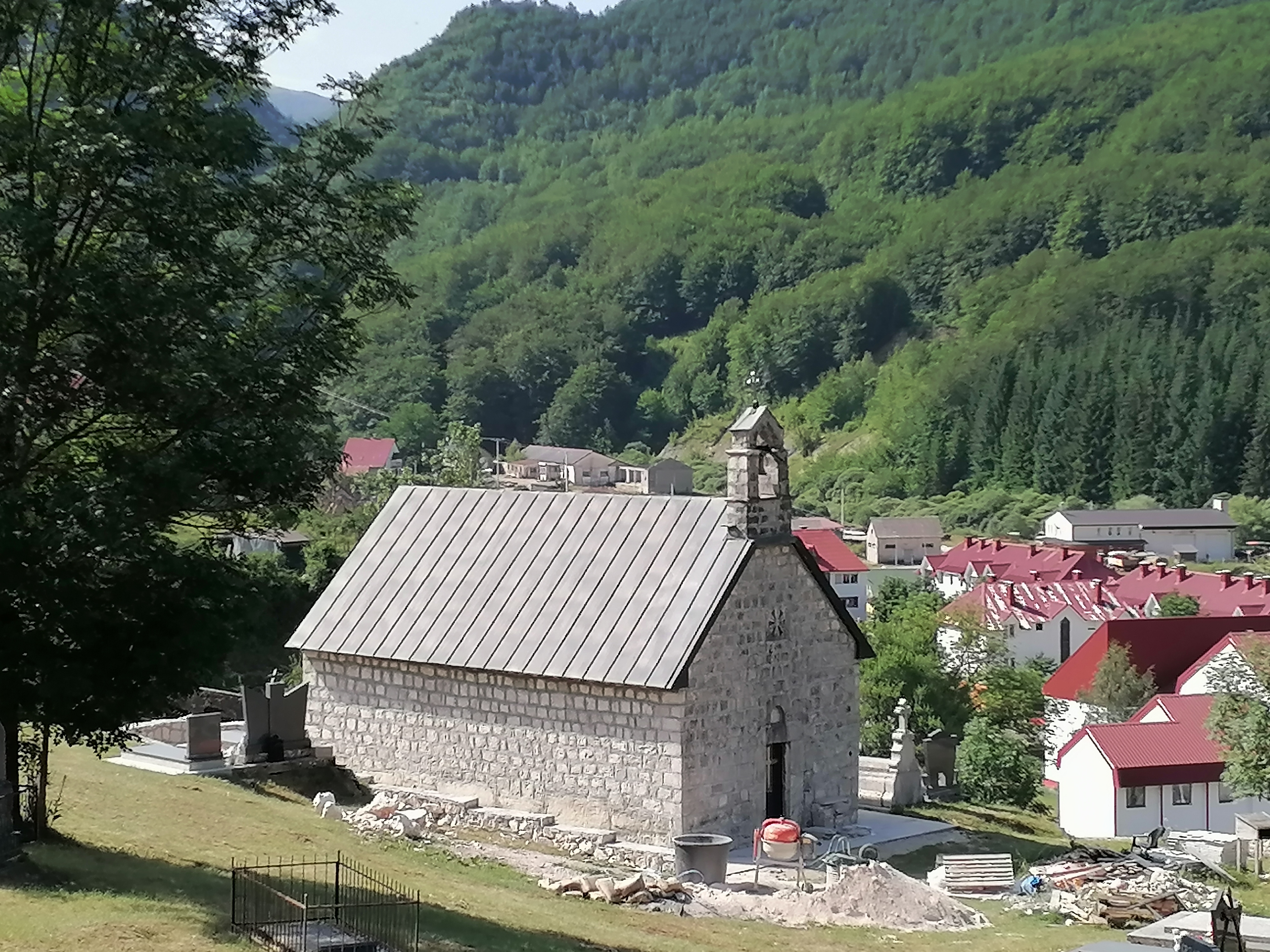
