= Bukovica (Komarnica) =

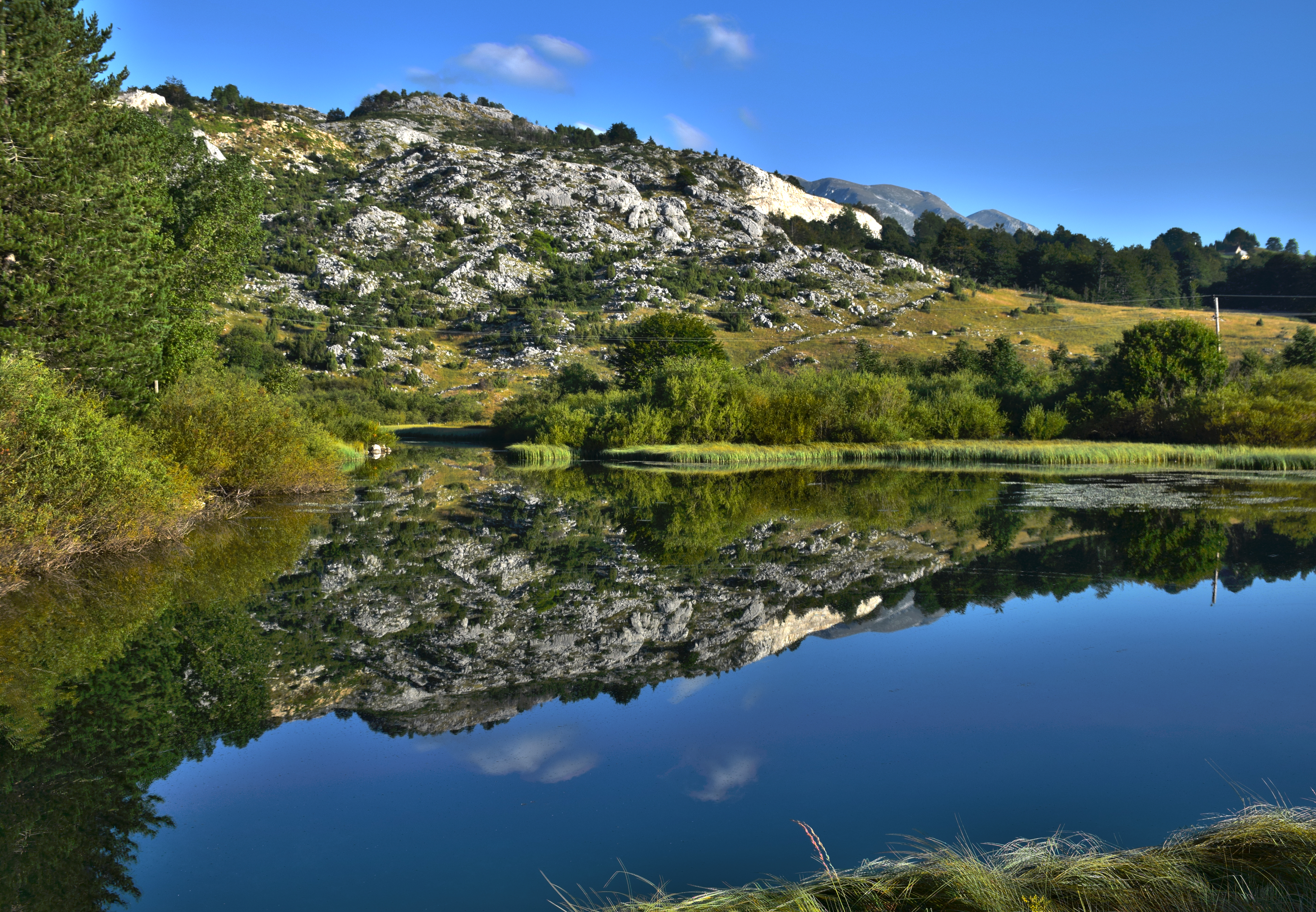

Location
- Country: Montenegro

Physical characteristics
- Source
  - location: Ranisava mountain
- Mouth
  - location: Komarnica (river)
  - coordinates: 42°58′25″N 19°01′54″E

Basin features
- Progression: Pridvorica→ Komarnica→ Piva→ Drina→ Sava→ Danube→ Black Sea

The Bukovica (Montenegrin: Буковица) is the longest river in the municipality of Šavnik, Montenegro. It rises under the Ranisava mountain, passes through the town Šavnik where it merges with a number of other rivers, including the Šavnik and the Bijela, and becomes the Pridvorica, which soon flows into the Komarnica near the village of Duži. It is 42 km long.
