= Barno Lake =

Lake in Montenegro

- Serbo-Croatian: Барно језеро / Barno jezero
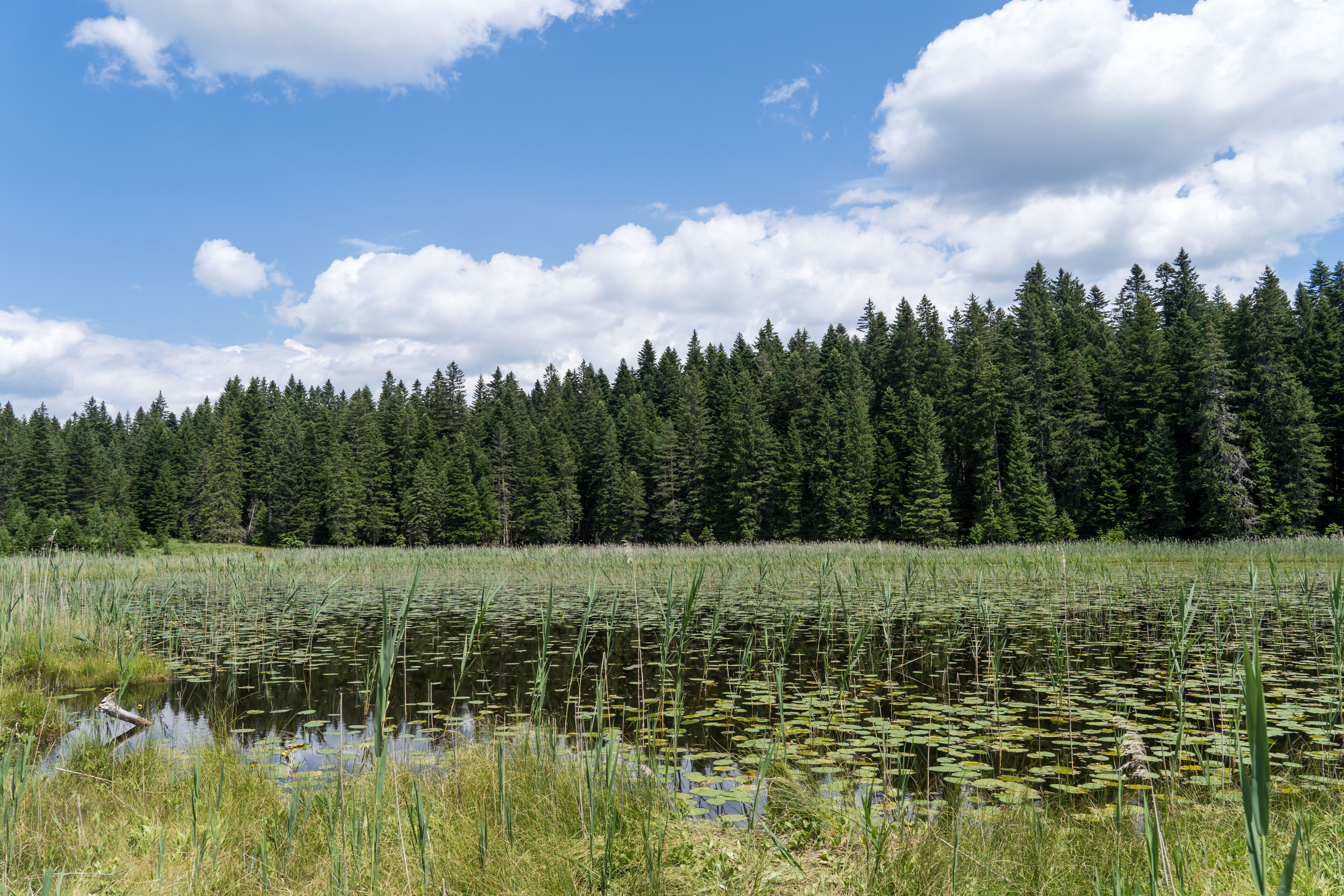
- Location in Durmitor National Park
- Location: Durmitor National Park, Montenegro
- Coordinates: 43.1570034°N 19.0924995°E
- Type: Glacial lake
- Basin countries: Montenegro
- Max. depth: 1 m (3 ft 3 in)
- Surface elevation: 1,489 m (4,885 ft)

Barno Lake (Serbo-Croatian: Барно језеро, romanized: Barno jezero) is a small glacial lake situated within Durmitor National Park in Montenegro at an altitude of 1,489 meters. It is one of the park's 18 glacial lakes, collectively known as the "Mountain Eyes" (Gorske Oči).

== Geography and ecology ==
Barno jezero is characterized as a small lake with a maximum depth of only one meter. Its shores are overgrown with dense marsh and water vegetation, and it is surrounded by a coniferous forest. The area can be boggy, particularly after rain. The lake is situated in a marshy area near a peat bog, which contributes to its unique ecosystem and often results in darker water. It is located between Velika Poljana and the village of Pitomine on the east side, and the village of Bosača on the west side.

The lake is a seasonal feature, with its size changing according to the time of year. During the summer, the water is often not visible.

== In popular culture ==
According to local folk tales, the water of Barno jezero is believed to have healing properties, especially for treating skin diseases.

== Tourism and access ==
The lake is accessible via a hiking trail. It is featured on the "Three Lakes Circuit," an intermediate-level, approximately 10 km hiking route that also connects Black Lake and Zminje Lake. It is the closest lake to the popular Black Lake (Serbo-Croatian: Црно језеро, romanized: Crno jezero).
