= Jablan Lake =

Glacial lake in Montenegro

- Jablan Jezero / Jаблан Jезеро (Serbo-Croatian); Мало Језеро / Malo Jezero (Serbo-Croatian)
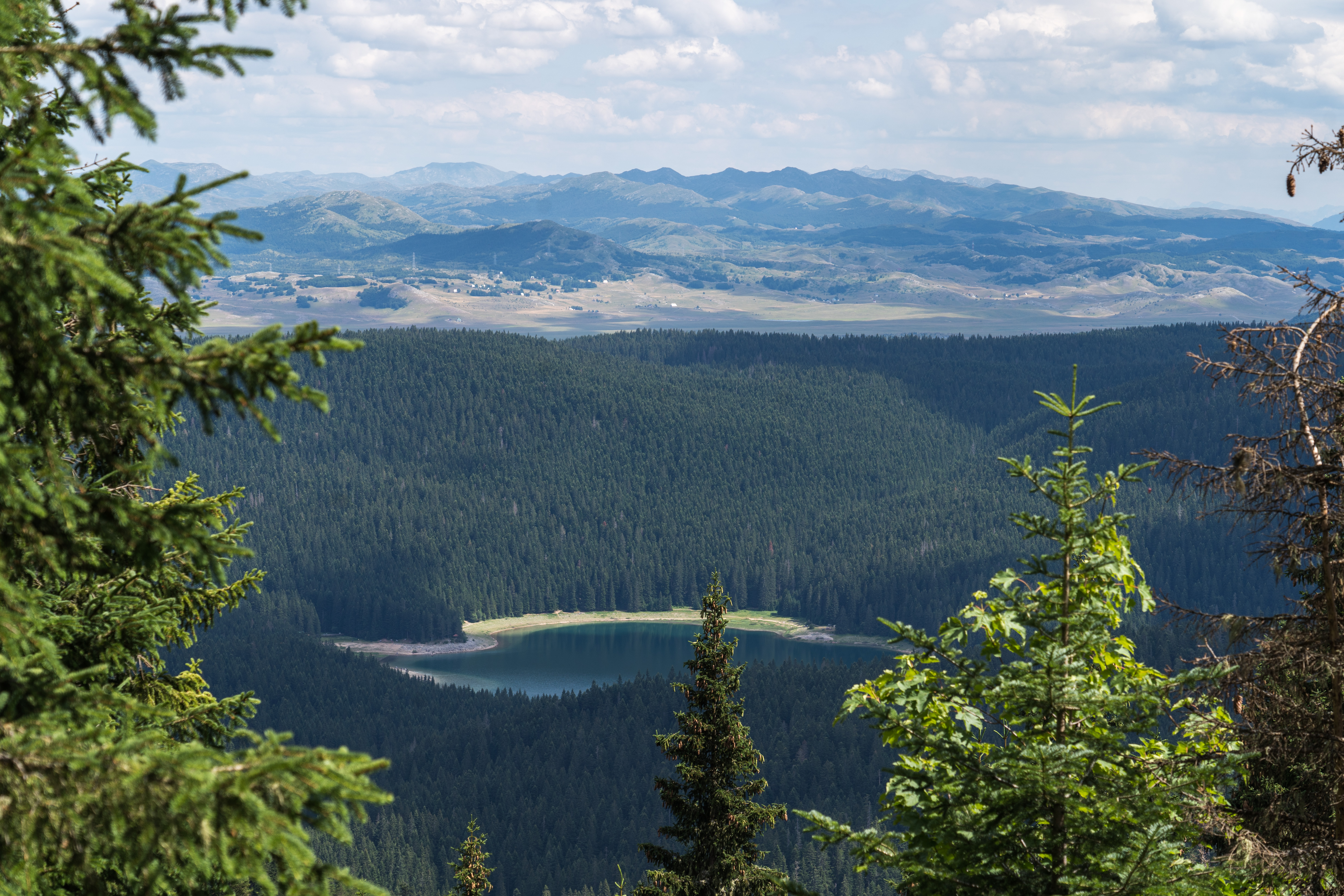
- Interactive map of Jablan Lake
- Location: Durmitor National Park, Montenegro
- Coordinates: 43.1670809°N 19.0609179°E
- Type: Glacial lake
- Basin countries: Montenegro
- Max. length: 240 m (790 ft)
- Max. depth: 8.5 m (28 ft)
- Surface elevation: 1,791 m (5,876 ft)

Jablan Lake (Serbo-Croatian: Jablan Jezero / Јаблан Језеро), also known as Malo Jezero (meaning "Small Lake"), is a glacial lake located within Durmitor National Park in Montenegro. Situated at an altitude of approximately 1,791 meters, it is considered one of the "Mountain Eyes" (Gorske oči) of Durmitor. The lake’s name is linked to the word for ash tree ("jablan"), though the surrounding area is characterized by coniferous forests and alpine meadows.

== Geography and Hydrology ==
The lake is roughly 240 meters long with a maximum depth of 8.5 meters, making it larger and deeper than some other glacial lakes on the Durmitor massif. The water level is highest in spring and early summer, often dropping significantly by late summer.

== Hiking and Access ==
Jablan Lake is a popular destination for hiking, offering a more secluded experience compared to the park's more frequented sites like Black Lake.
The two main trailheads are:

- From Bosača: A short, accessible hike (approx. 2.1 km one way) starting near the Momčilov Grad restaurant on the panoramic road.
- From Žabljak/Black Lake: A longer, full-day loop trek (approx. 14–15 km total) that passes through the villages of Pitomine and Bosača, and can include viewpoints at Crvena Greda and Zminje Lake.
