= List of lakes of Montenegro =

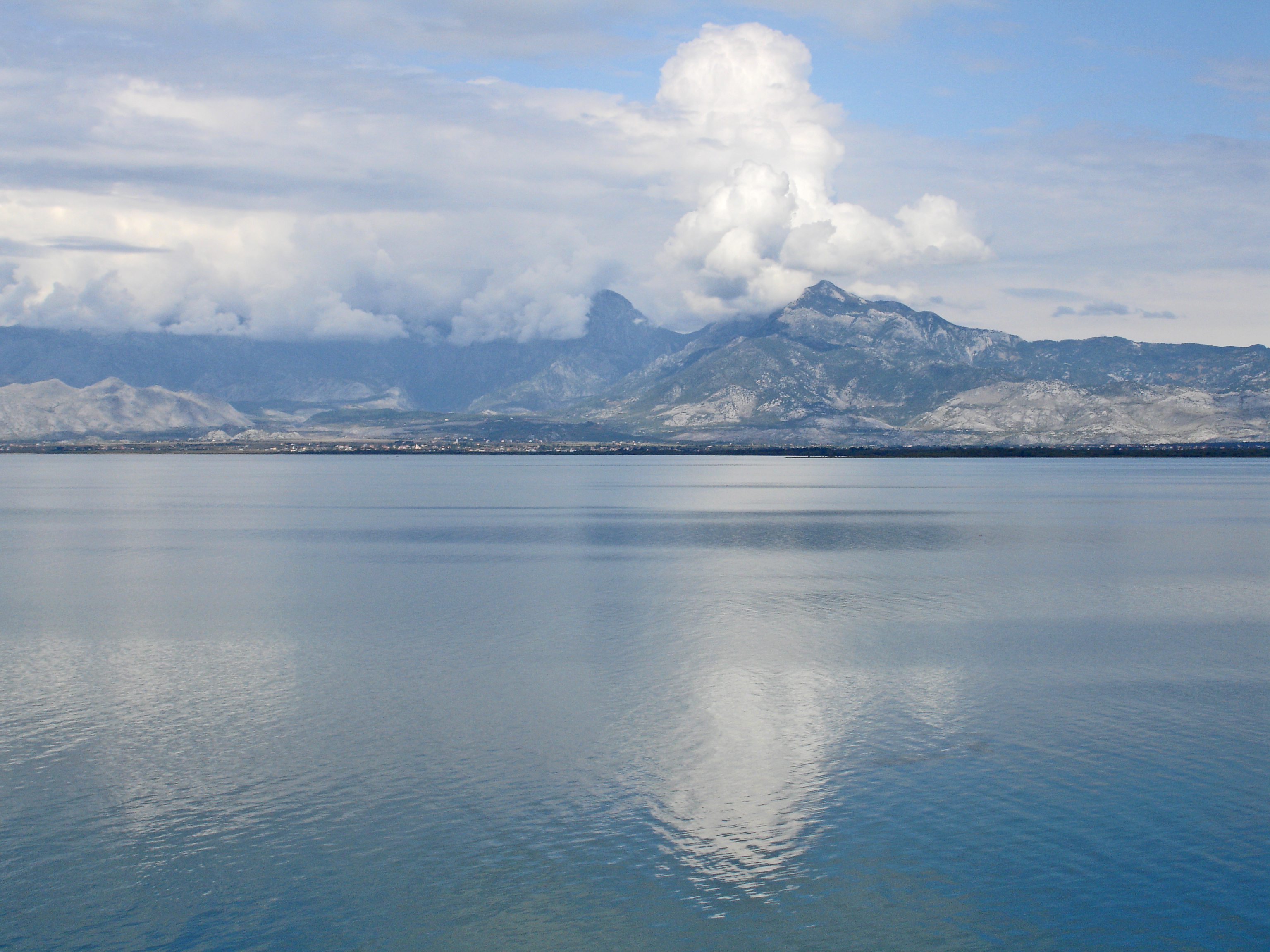
Skadar Lake

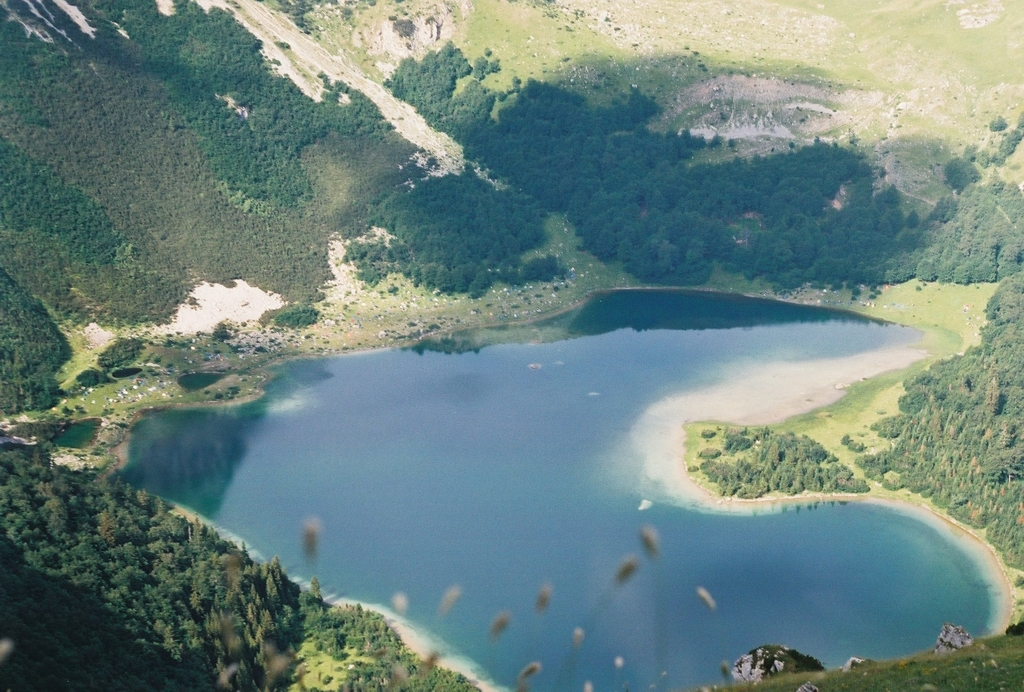
Trnovačko Lake

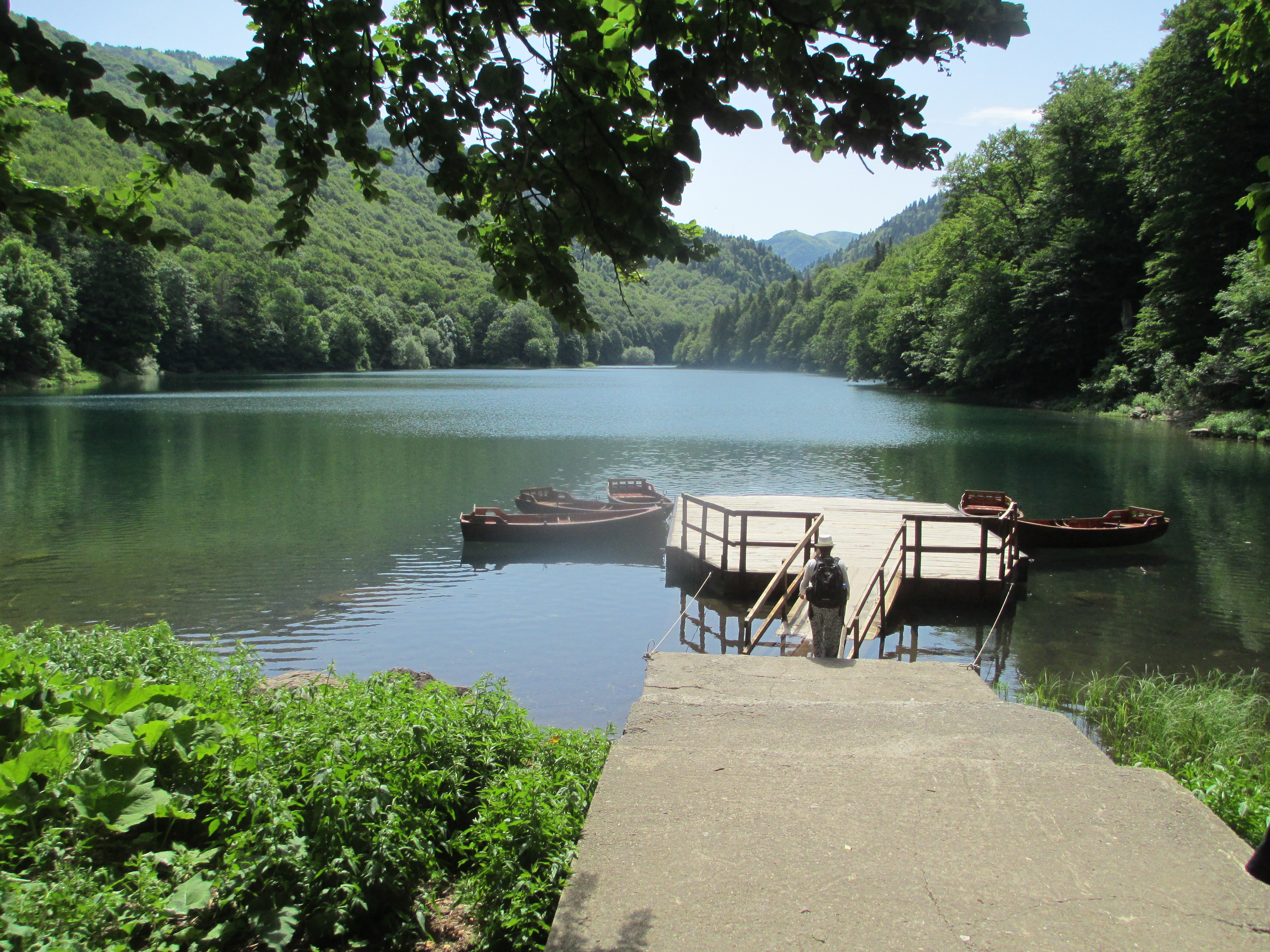
Lake Biograd

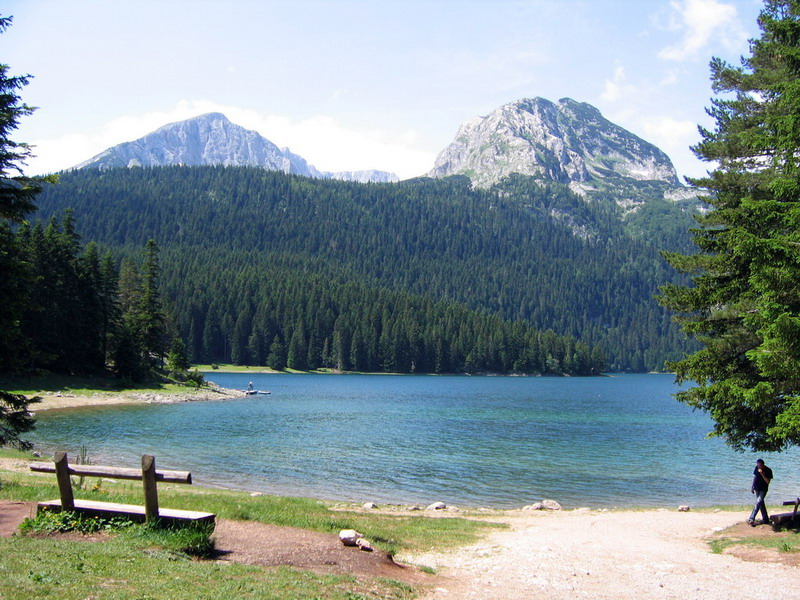
Black Lake

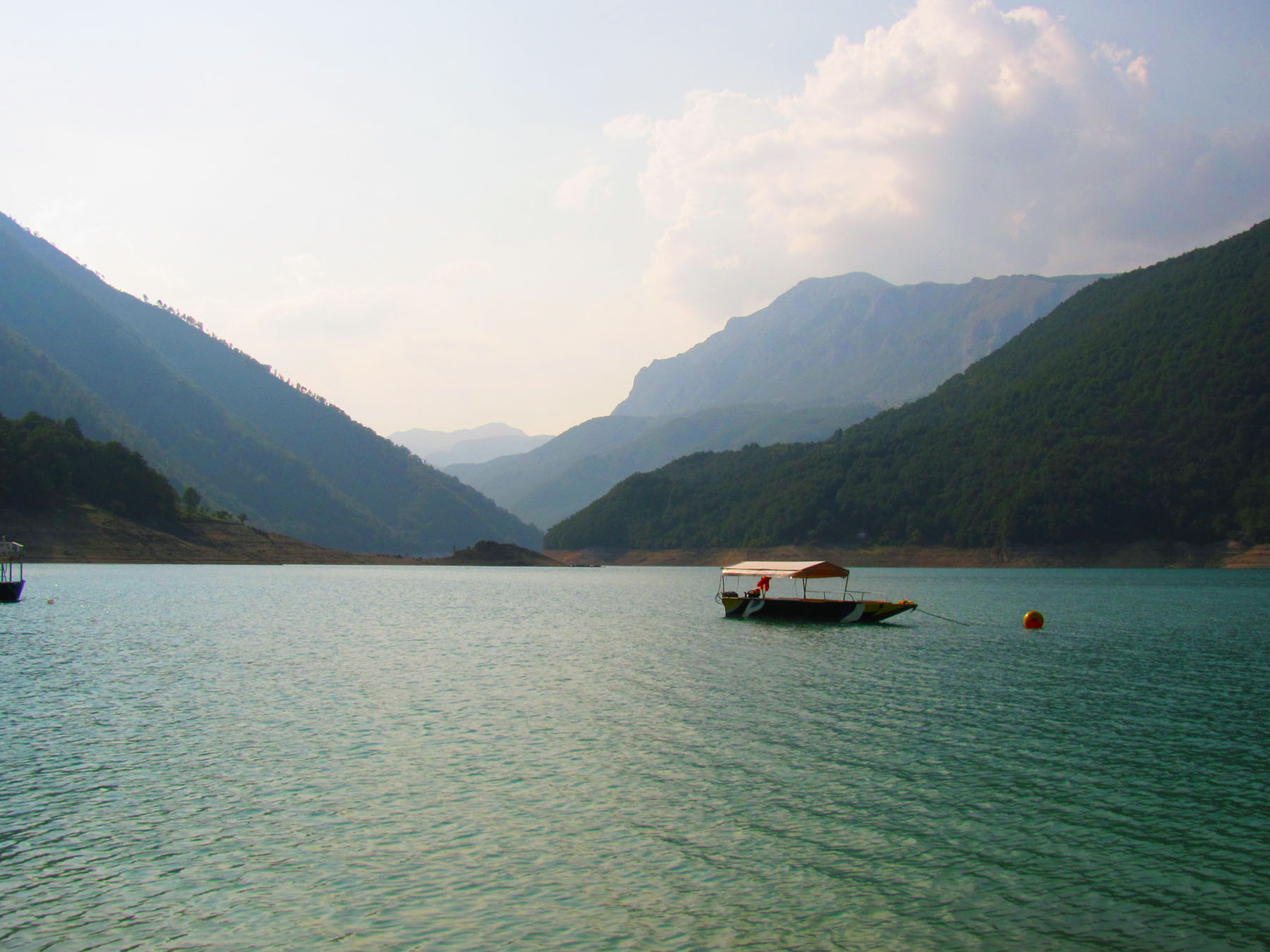
Lake Piva

The following is a list of lakes in Montenegro.

- Lake Bileća (Bilećko jezero) - Only partly in Montenegro, with most of the lake in Bosnia and Herzegovina.
- Lake Biograd (Biogradsko jezero)
- Black Lake (Crno jezero) - Glacial lake near Žabljak on Durmitor.
- Lake Grahovo (Grahovsko jezero)
- Lake Hrid (Hridsko jezero) - at Prokletije National park
- Lake Kapetan (Kapetanovo jezero) - Glacial lake, 20 km east of Nikšić.
- Lake Krupac (Krupačko jezero) - Artificial lake near Nikšić.
- Lake Liverovići (Jezero Liverovići) - Artificial lake near Nikšić.
- Lake Manito (Manito jezero) - Glacial lake, 20 km east of Nikšić, near Lake Kapetan and smaller of two.
- Lake Pešići (Pešića jezero), on Bjelasica
- Lake Piva (Pivsko jezero) - Biggest artificial lake in Montenegro.
- Lake Plav (Plavsko jezero) - Glacial lake, near Plav, between Prokletije and Visitor.
- Lake Rikavac (Rikavačko jezero), on Žijovo mountain (Kuči)
- Lake Rujište (Jezero Rujište) - in Biševo, Rožaje.
- Lake Skadar (Skadarsko jezero/Liqeni i Shkodres) - 2/3 in Montenegro, rest of it in Albania.
- Lake Slano (Slano jezero) - Artificial lake near Nikšić.
- Lake Sušica (Sušičko jezero), on Durmitor mountain
- Lake Šas (Šasko jezero/Liqeni i Shasit)
- Lake Šiš (Šiško jezero), on Bjelasica mountain
- Lake Trnovac (Trnovačko jezero)
- Lake Visitor (Visitorsko jezero)
- Vražje Lake (Lake Vrag) - Glacial lake near Žabljak.
- Lake Zminica (Zminičko jezero) - Glacial lake near Žabljak.
- Lake Zogaj (Zogajsko jezero/Liqeni i Zogajve) - Crastic lake near Ulcinj.

== See also ==
- Geography of Montenegro
