= Streptomyces durmitorensis =

Scientific classification
- Domain: Bacteria
- Kingdom: Bacillati
- Phylum: Actinomycetota
- Class: Actinomycetes
- Order: Streptomycetales
- Family: Streptomycetaceae
- Genus: Streptomyces
- Species: S. durmitorensis

Binomial name
- Streptomyces durmitorensis Savic et al. 2007

Type strain
- CIP 108995, DSM 41863, JCM 16011, MS405

Species of bacterium

Streptomyces durmitorensis is a bacterium species from the genus of Streptomyces which has been isolated from soil from the Durmitor National Park in Serbia and Montenegro.

== See also ==
- List of Streptomyces species
