= Valovito Lake =

Glacial lake in Montenegro

- Valovito Jezero / Валовито језеро (Serbo-Croatian)
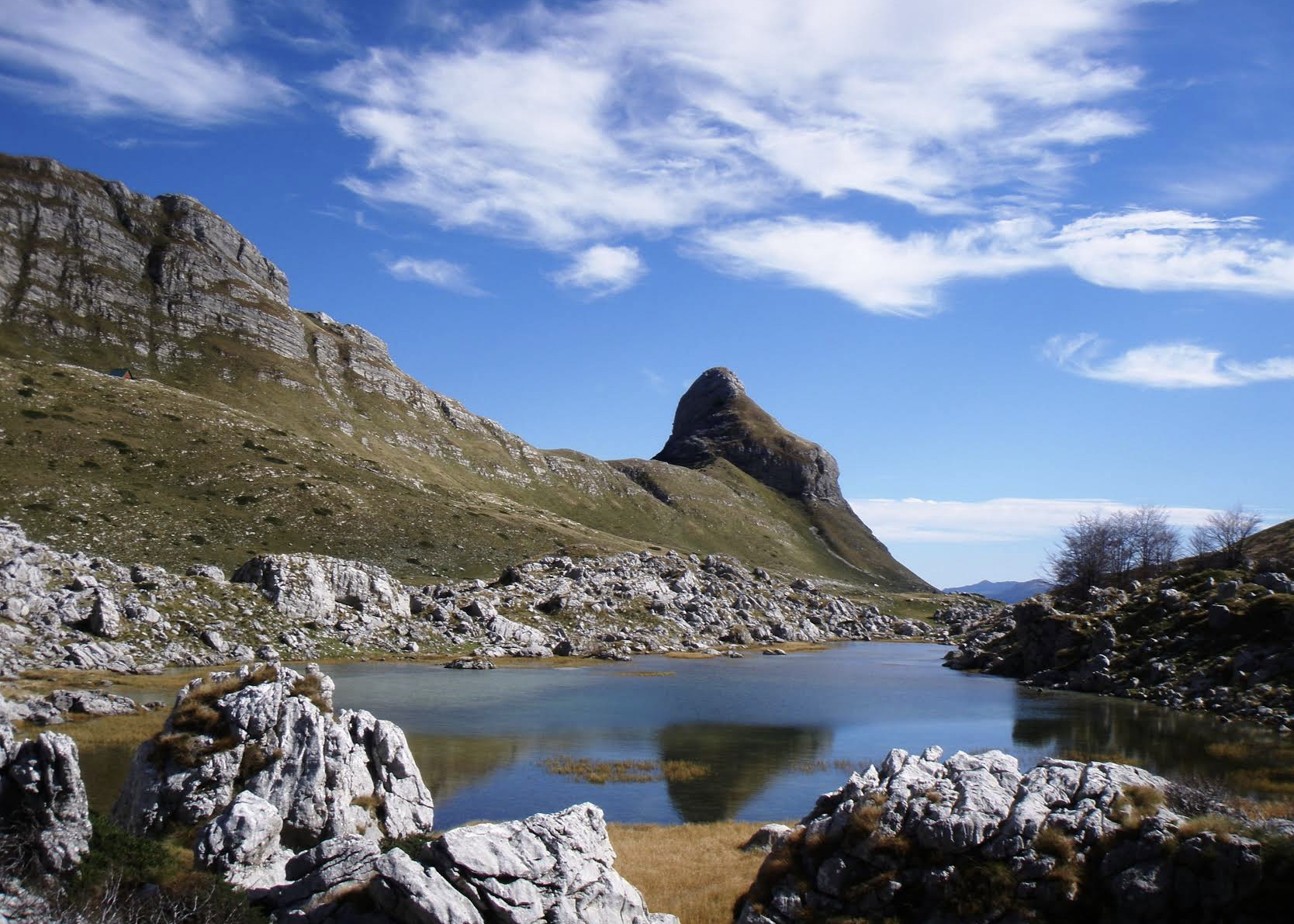
- Location in Durmitor National Park
- Location: Durmitor National Park, Montenegro
- Coordinates: 43°05′47″N 19°03′57″E
- Type: Glacial lake
- Primary inflows: Precipitation and springs
- Primary outflows: Evaporation
- Basin countries: Montenegro
- Max. length: 225 m (738 ft)
- Max. width: 85 m (279 ft) (max)
- Surface area: 11,600 m^{2} (125,000 sq ft)
- Average depth: 0.9 m (2 ft 11 in) (avg, summer)
- Max. depth: 3.5 m (11 ft)
- Surface elevation: 1,705 m (5,594 ft)

Valovito Lake (Serbo-Croatian: Valovito jezero / Валовито језеро) is one of the smallest glacial lakes in Durmitor National Park, Montenegro. It is situated in the Pošćenska valley at an elevation of 1,705 meters above sea level. It lies directly below the road from Žabljak to Trsa, between the peak of Stožina and the Sedlo mountain pass.

== Hydrology and Etymology ==
The lake is of glacial origin and is fed by several springs. Its basin retains water, which is lost primarily through evaporation. Lake's average depth in summer is about 0.9 meters, with a maximum depth of 3.5 meters. However, water level fluctuations throughout the year can reach up to 80 cm. Due to climatic changes, the lake, which was once wider and deeper, is now under threat of disappearance. It is known for its clear water and its color, which varies with weather and light conditions, the shoreline is characterized by an abundance of stones and rocks, from which the lake derives its name: the Montenegrin word "val" or "vao" means an area with a large amount of fallen rocks. A smaller separate part of the lake, with a length of 37 m, a width of 22 m, and a depth of 0.7 m, is located nearby.

== Access and Tourism ==
The lake is located about 12.5 km from the center of Žabljak and is not served by public transport, requiring private vehicle or foot access. A notable landmark is the "Lomni do" konoba (a small roadside house) built above the lake, offering refreshments. It is also accessible by a direct, unmarked descent from the road near the konoba. A marked trail goes around approximately half of the lake's perimeter.
