= Vražje Lake =

Glacial lake in Montenegro

Coordinates: 43°05′03″N 19°08′44″E

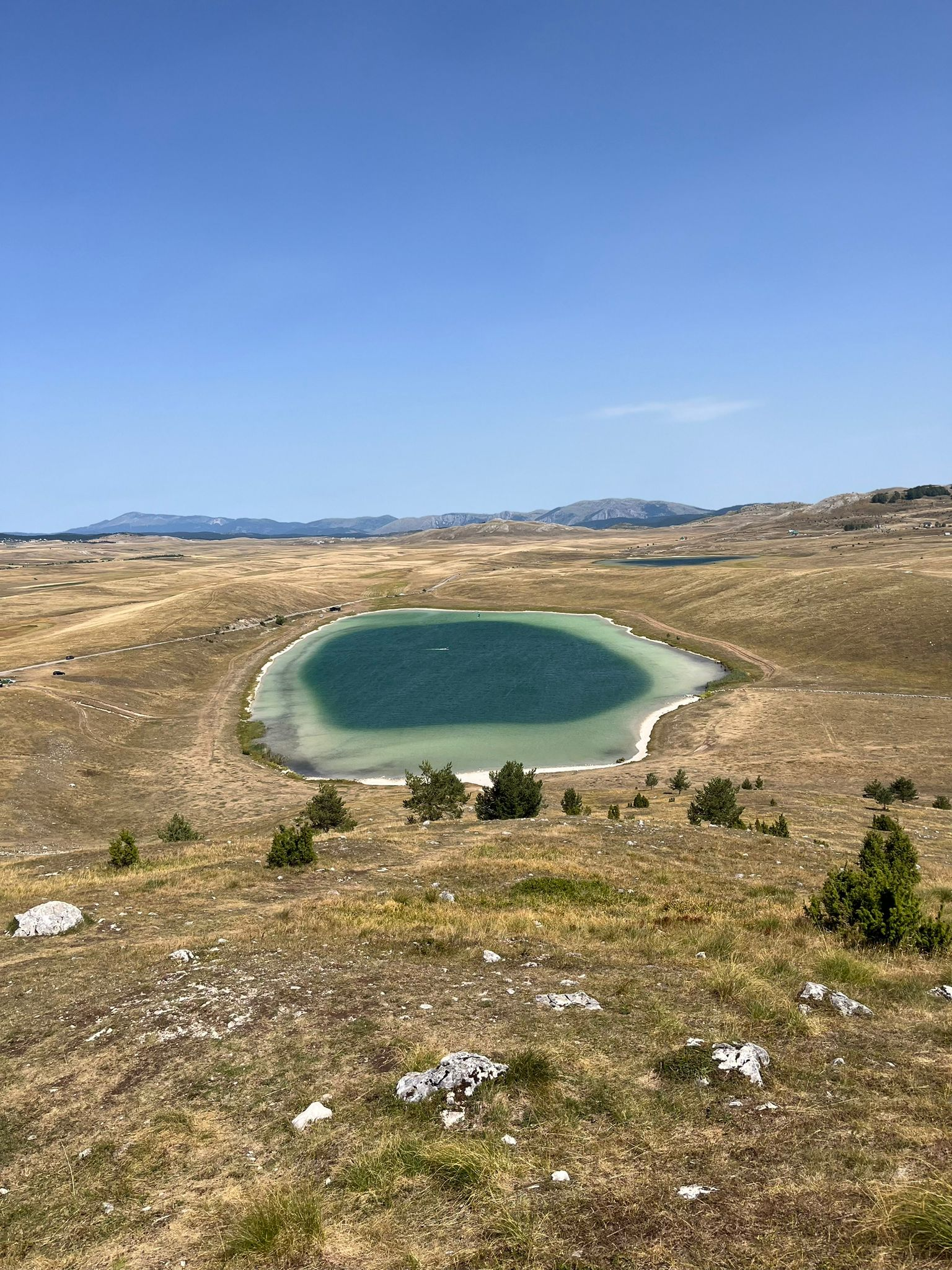
- Vražje Lake, near Žabljak
- Interactive map of Vražje Lake
- Location: Durmitor National Park, Montenegro
- Type: Glacial lake
- Primary inflows: Snowmelt and underground springs
- Primary outflows: Underground seepage
- Basin countries: Montenegro
- Max. length: 170 m (560 ft)
- Max. width: 220 m (720 ft)
- Surface area: 0.036 km^{2} (0.014 sq mi)
- Max. depth: 10–11 m (33–36 ft)
- Surface elevation: 1,411 m (4,629 ft)
- Frozen: In winter

Vražje Lake (Вражје језеро, meaning "Devil's Lake") is a small glacial lake located in Durmitor National Park, near the town of Žabljak, in northern Montenegro. It lies on the Jezerska plateau, about 12 km southeast of Žabljak, along the old road to Nikšić.

== Geography ==
The lake is situated at an elevation of about 1,411 metres above sea level. It covers an area of roughly 0.036 km², with a length of 170 metres and a width of 220 metres. The maximum depth reaches around 10–11 metres. Vražje Lake is of glacial origin and is fed mainly by snowmelt and underground springs. During summer, water temperatures can reach 17–20 °C, while in winter the lake often freezes.

== Ecology and tourism ==
The lake is part of Durmitor National Park, a UNESCO World Heritage Site. It is a popular site for walking, photography, and seasonal swimming, though the water remains relatively cold. Local authorities regulate access to preserve the fragile alpine ecosystem.

== Legends and name ==
The name "Vražje" translates as "Devil's". According to local legend, the devil once built a crystal palace at the bottom of the lake, and the waters occasionally reflect otherworldly colours. The lake’s shifting hues have also contributed to its reputation as a mysterious place.

== Gallery ==
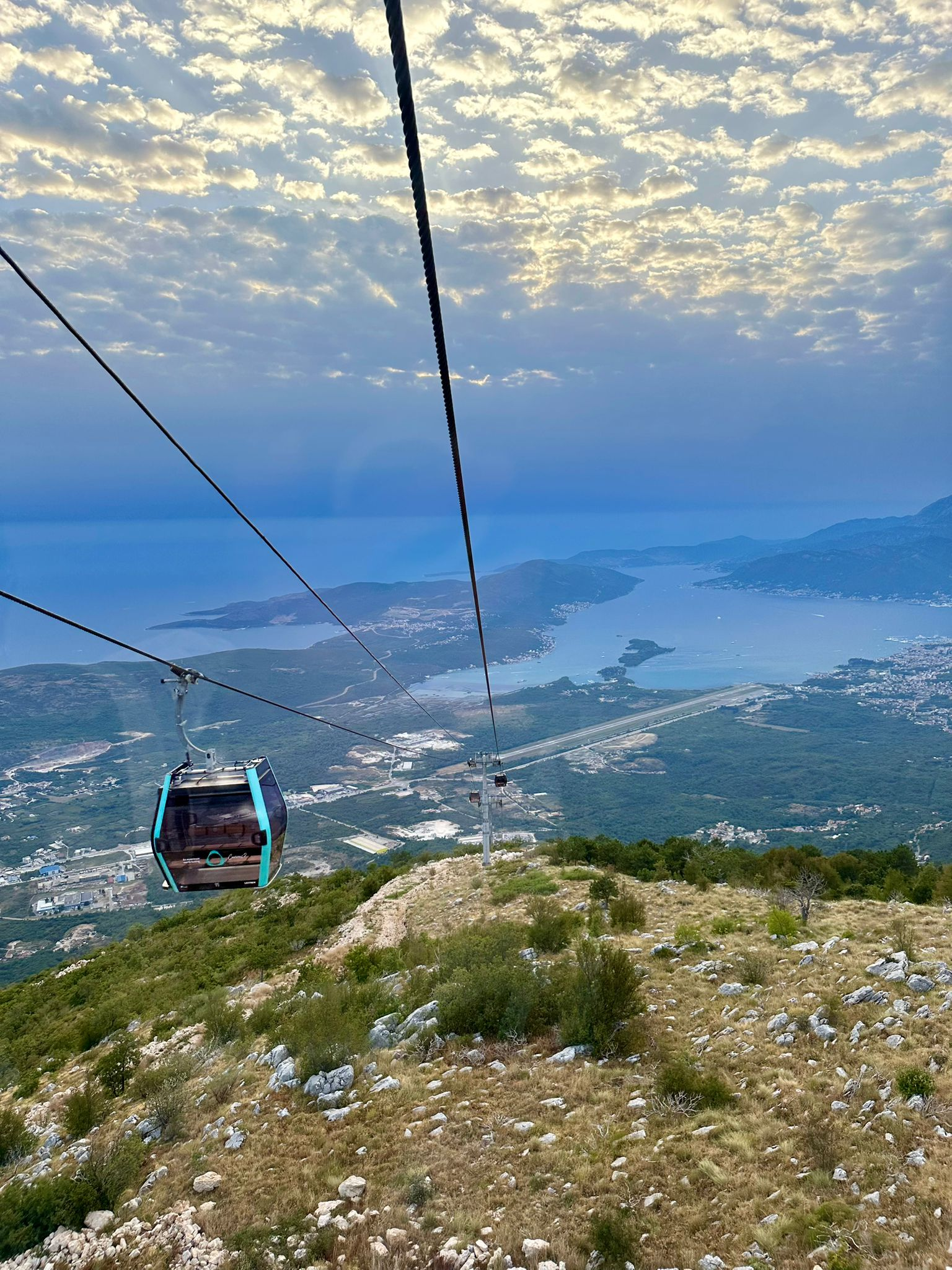
Aerial lift near Vražje Lake

== See also ==
- Black Lake (Montenegro)
- Durmitor
- List of lakes of Montenegro
