= Lake Pošćenje =

- Pošćensko Jezero / Пошћенско језеро (Serbo-Croatian)
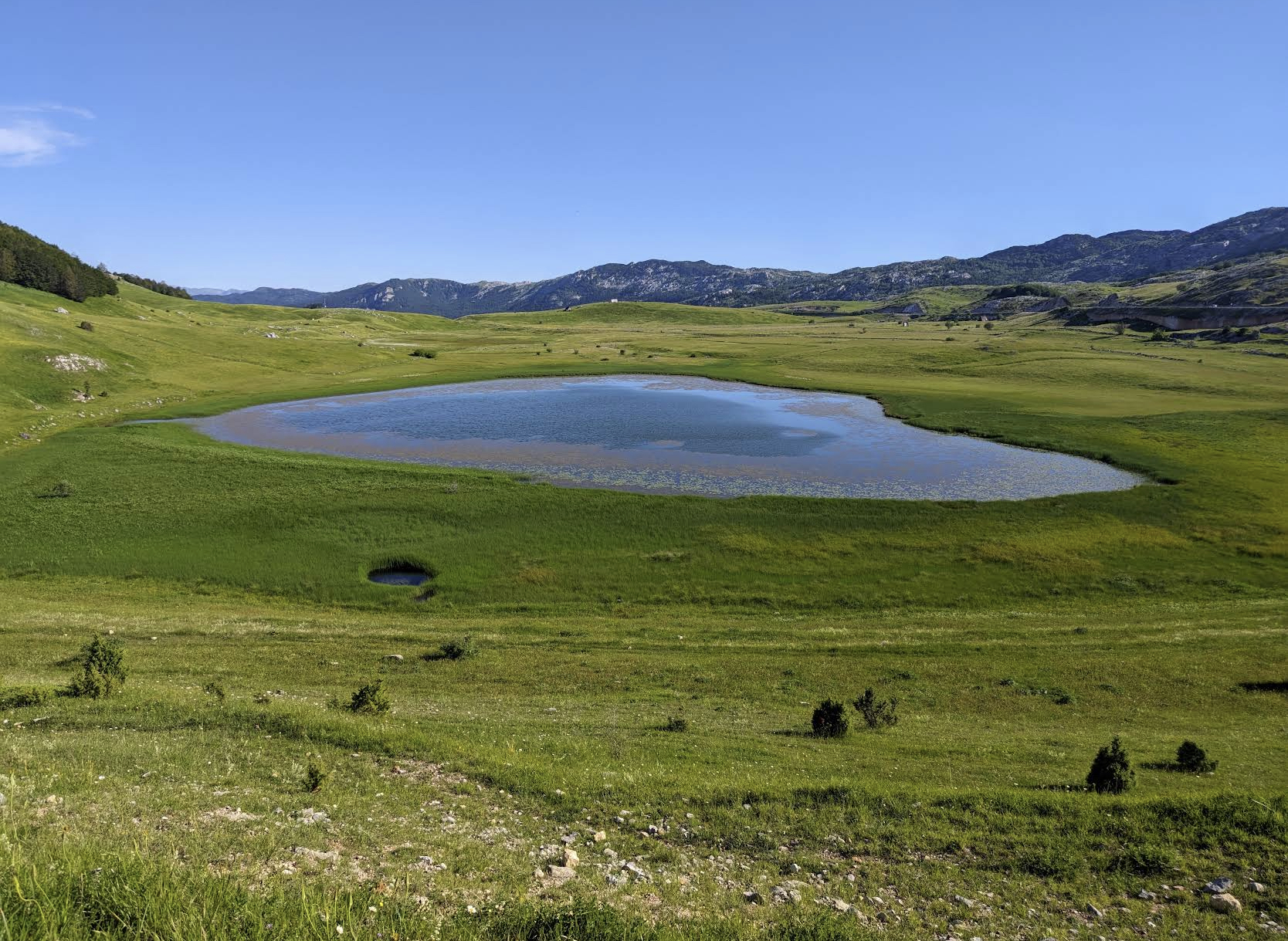
- Location in Durmitor National Park
- Location: Durmitor National Park, Montenegro
- Coordinates: 43°05′28″N 19°06′34″E
- Type: Glacial lake
- Primary inflows: Precipitation and three small springs
- Primary outflows: Strijеževica stream (periodic)
- Basin countries: Montenegro
- Max. length: 215 m (705 ft)
- Max. width: 155 m (509 ft)
- Surface area: 15,300 m^{2} (165,000 sq ft)
- Average depth: 1 m (3 ft 3 in) (average)
- Max. depth: 3.8 m (12 ft)
- Water volume: 15,000 m^{3} (530,000 cu ft)
- Shore length^{1}: 700 m (2,300 ft)
- Surface elevation: 1,495 m (4,905 ft)
- ^{1} Shore length is not a well-defined measure.

Lake Pošćenje (Serbo-Croatian: Pošćensko jezero / Пошћенско језеро) is a glacial lake situated in the southeastern foothills of the Durmitor massif within Durmitor National Park, Montenegro The lake lies in an area known as the Pošćenski Kraj, which is permanently inhabited. It is located approximately 7.5 km from Žabljak and is easily accessible, with a macadam road from Žabljak to Trsa passing by the lake.

== Geography and Hydrology ==
Lake Pošćenje lies at an elevation of 1,495 meters. Its basin was formed by glacial erosion and is dammed by morainic material, classifying it as an intermorainic lake. The lake's formation is also influenced by the Durmitor dislocation, a tectonic line. The lake has a length of 215 meters, a width of 155 meters, and a shoreline of approximately 700 meters during low summer water levels, covering an area of 15,300 m². Depths increase regularly from the shore towards the center, with a maximum depth of 3.8 meters and an average depth of less than 1 meter. The lake's volume is about 15,000 m³. A significant portion of the lake basin is covered by vegetation, including a belt of water lilies.

The lake is fed by precipitation and three springs with a combined flow of about 10 liters per second. Its outflow is the periodic Strijеževica stream, which has carved a narrow valley. During rainy periods in July, the stream's discharge can reach 15 l/s, but it often dries up by late summer. The lake's water level is highest during spring snowmelt and lowest in late summer due to increased evaporation and decreased inflow. The lake freezes over from early December until the end of February.

The water transparency in the central part of the lake reaches up to 3 meters. The surface water can warm to 20 °C in summer. Chemical analysis shows a relatively low dry residue content (95 mg/l), an almost neutral pH (7.3), and increased hardness and alkalinity compared to other Durmitor lakes, attributed to the limestone composition of the catchment and the presence of flysch. The magnesium content is also notably high (18.9 mg/l). Due to dense and partially decaying vegetation, the water can have an unpleasant taste during warm summer days, indicating the lake is in an advanced stage of evolution towards becoming a marsh.

== Name Origin ==
The area around the lake is named after the village of Pošćenje near Šavnik, from where the inhabitants who settled this area originated. Near that village, there are two small water bodies also known as Pošćenska jezera.
