= Bobotov Kuk =

Mountain in Montenegro

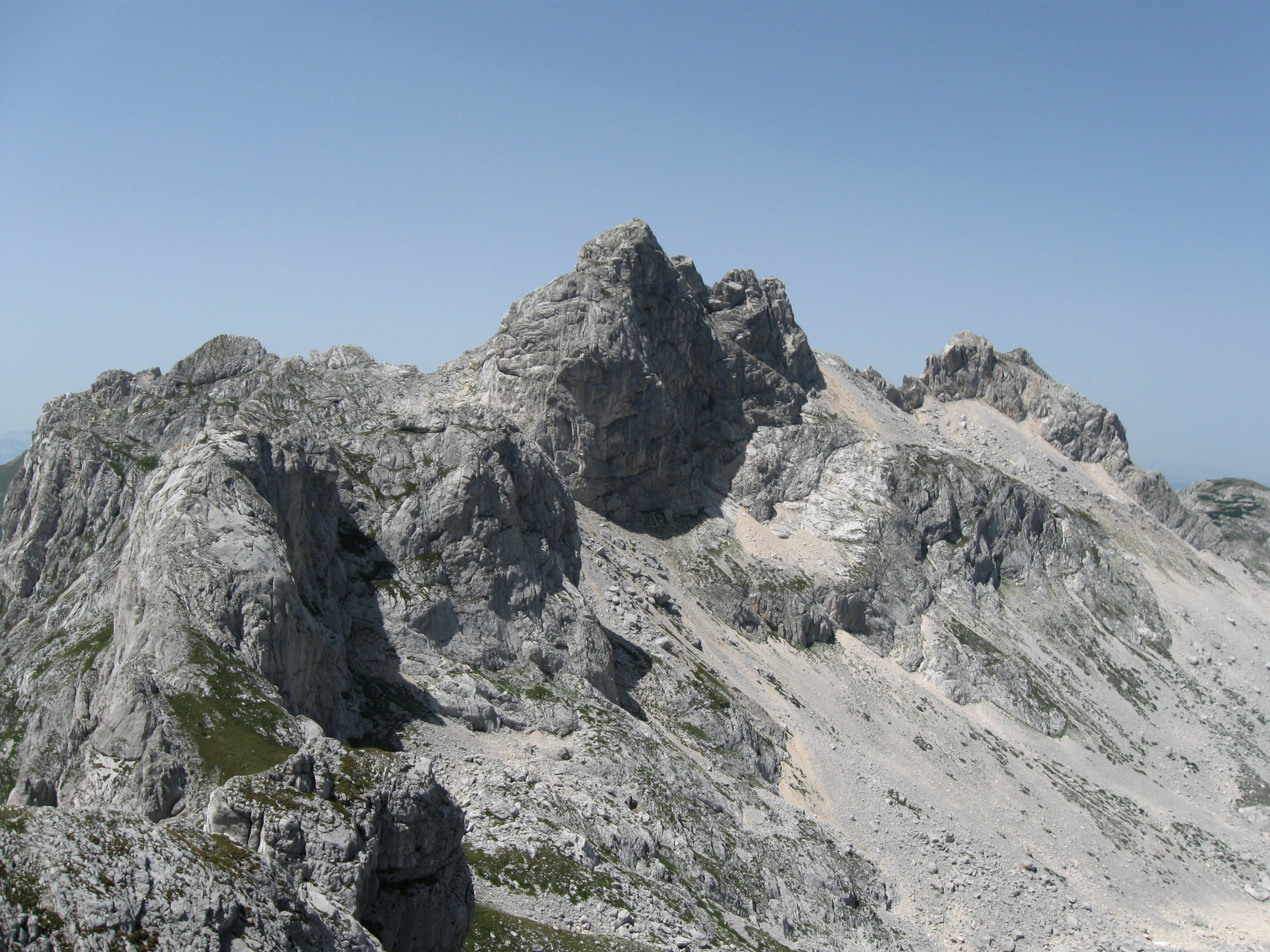
- View of Bobotov Kuk from Minin Bogaz (from the east)

Highest point
- Elevation: 2,523 m (8,278 ft)
- Prominence: 1,480 m (4,860 ft)
- Isolation: 92.77 km (57.64 mi) to Maja e Madhe
- Coordinates: 43°07′41″N 19°02′05″E

Geography
- Location within Montenegro
- Location: Montenegro
- Parent range: Durmitor (Dinaric Alps)

Bobotov Kuk (Montenegrin: Боботов Кук) is a peak in northern Montenegro. At 2,523 m (8,278 ft), it is the highest peak in the Durmitor mountain range and had been thought to be the highest point in Montenegro. New surveys have shown there are three higher peaks on the border with Albania. Most Montenegrin mountains are visible from Bobotov Kuk, among them Lovćen (above the Adriatic Sea), Kopaonik and Tara (in Serbia), Maglić (in Bosnia and Herzegovina).

The first recorded ascent of Bobotov Kuk was in 1883 by an Austrian cartographer, Oscar Baumann. The first organized mountaineering group from Zagreb came to Durmitor in 1926. In 1931 two Austrians completed the first winter ascent to Bezimeni vrh.

== Peak and surroundings ==
The northern and eastern sides of the compact summit pyramid, which is around 200m high, rise above steep scree slopes that descend into a large rocky basin, Valoviti Do, at around 2000 to 2100m. This basin is strewn with huge boulders and partially covered with snow the whole summer. The western side of Bobotov Kuk is most impressive. Together with Bezimeni Vrh and Djevojka peaks, Bobotov Kuk (which is between them) form a large mountain wall and a type of natural amphitheatre. This wall is around 400m high and almost 2 km wide. Below this well are immense scree slopes, equally high, that descend steeply towards the bottom of the Skrka valley in Durmitor National Park, which contains both Veliko Skrcko Jezero (1686m) and Malo Skrcko Jezero (1711m) lakes. This is reputed to be the most beautiful part of the Durmitor Mountain Range. On the south side, Bobotov Kuk drops steeply towards the basin of Zeleni Vir (2028m) lake. Zeleni Vir is found at the bottom of an amphitheater, about which a wall made up of the peaks Bobotov Kuk, Lucin Vrh, Minin Bogaz (2387m) stretch. South of the lake is Zupci (2309m), a string of cliffs that resemble the teeth of some dangerous dinosaur. The lower 300m of this side of Bobotov Kuk is mix of steep rocky terrain with much grass and scree. Above it is the summit pyramid.

== History ==
Due to its isolated position, wild surroundings and volatile history of the continued struggle for Montenegrin liberation, Durmitor and its highest peak were not discovered (either scientifically or touristicly) until the mid-1800s. The first scientist was Ami Boué who wrote about the geology of Durmitor in his book ‘Geological Excursion in Turkish Europe’ in 1840. In 1883 Bobotov Kuk was first climbed by O. Baumann. Those were years of more intensified scientific research of the Durmitor region. In 1895 German geographer Kurt Hussert wrote the first book about the physical geography of Durmitor. At the end of the 19th century, Serbian botanist Josif Pančić discovered many endemic and rare floral species in the region. Extraordinary karst phenomena on Durmitor were first described by Serbian scientist Jovan Cvijić, who later became known for his "Das Karstphanomen" dissertation from 1893. The volatile early history of the 20th century prevented further research. The first organized mountaineering group visited Durmitor in 1926. They were members of Sljeme club from Zagreb, Croatia. In the same year the first ascents of the eastern face of Bobotov Kuk were achieved. In 1931, two Austrians, Bauer and Obersteiner, climbed the first winter ascent via NW ridge of Bezimeni Vrh and some other peaks. In 1933 a group of Slovenian climbers first ascended the highest faces of the Durmitor range, those of Bezimeni Vrh and Bobotov Kuk above Skrka valley. A team of Slovenians also ascended the first winter climbs on the faces of highest peaks of Durmitor in 1940.

An Italian Army report from June 12, 1943 confirms that a combined German-Italian-Bulgarian unit reached the summit and raised the flags of all three armies, on June 5th or 6th.

Only after the II World War did Durmitor become a well known destination for tourists, hikers, climbers and skiers.

== Climbing Bobotov Kuk ==
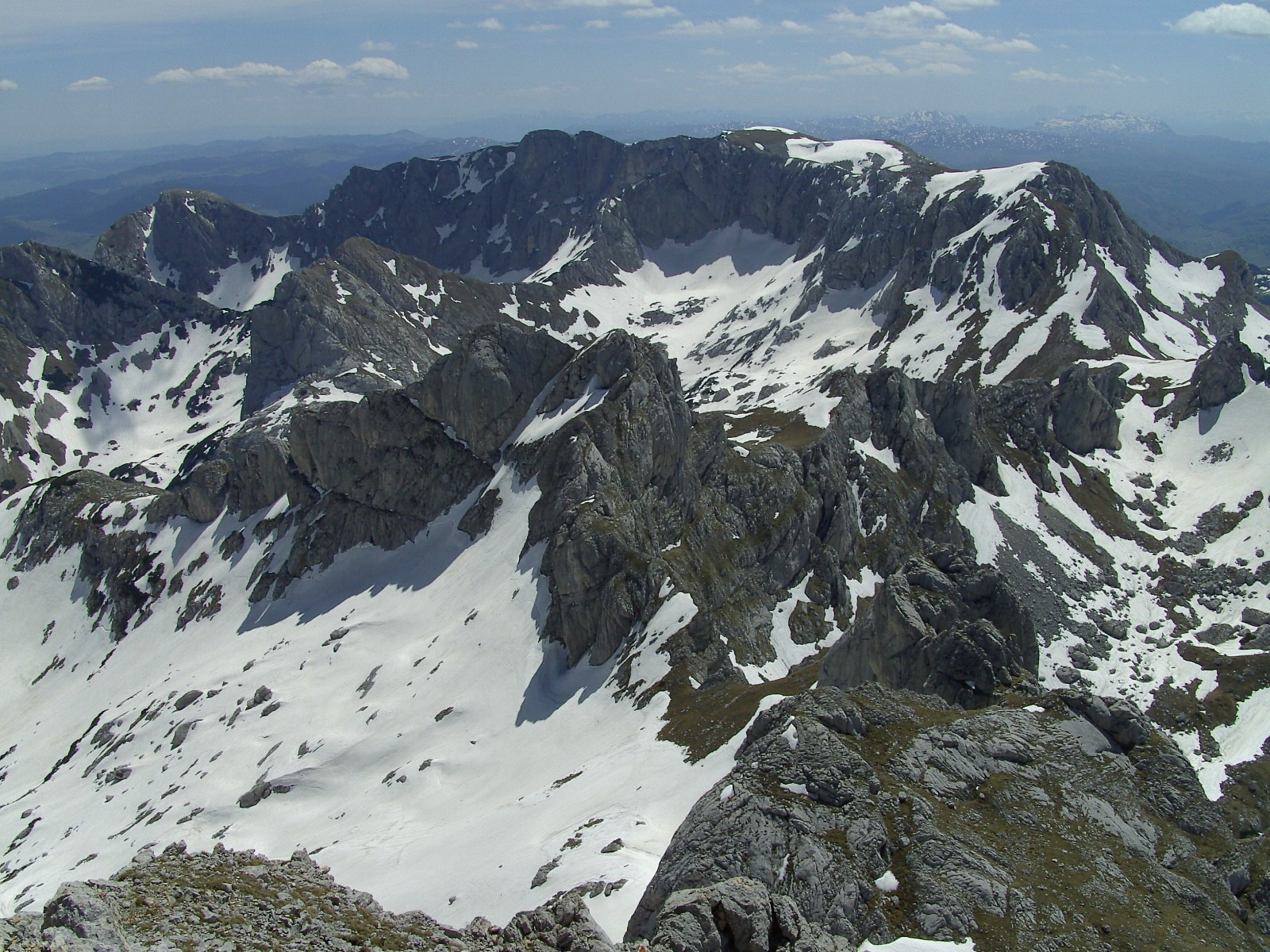
Northeast part of the Durmitor mountains with Medjed and Savin Kuk

The point of departure is from the resort town Zabljak. The route to the peak is marked with signposts and trail markings. It is approximately a ten-hour round trip as long as a moderate pace is maintained. The outward walk consists of approximately four to five hours hiking until the last ascent where it is a scramble to just below the peak. From there, climbers are directed to a slightly perilous path that winds its way up to the summit. Climbers should be aware that this is a strenuous hike, appropriate only for fit hikers.
