= Zeleni Vir =

- Zeleni Vir/Зелени вир (Serbo-Croatian)
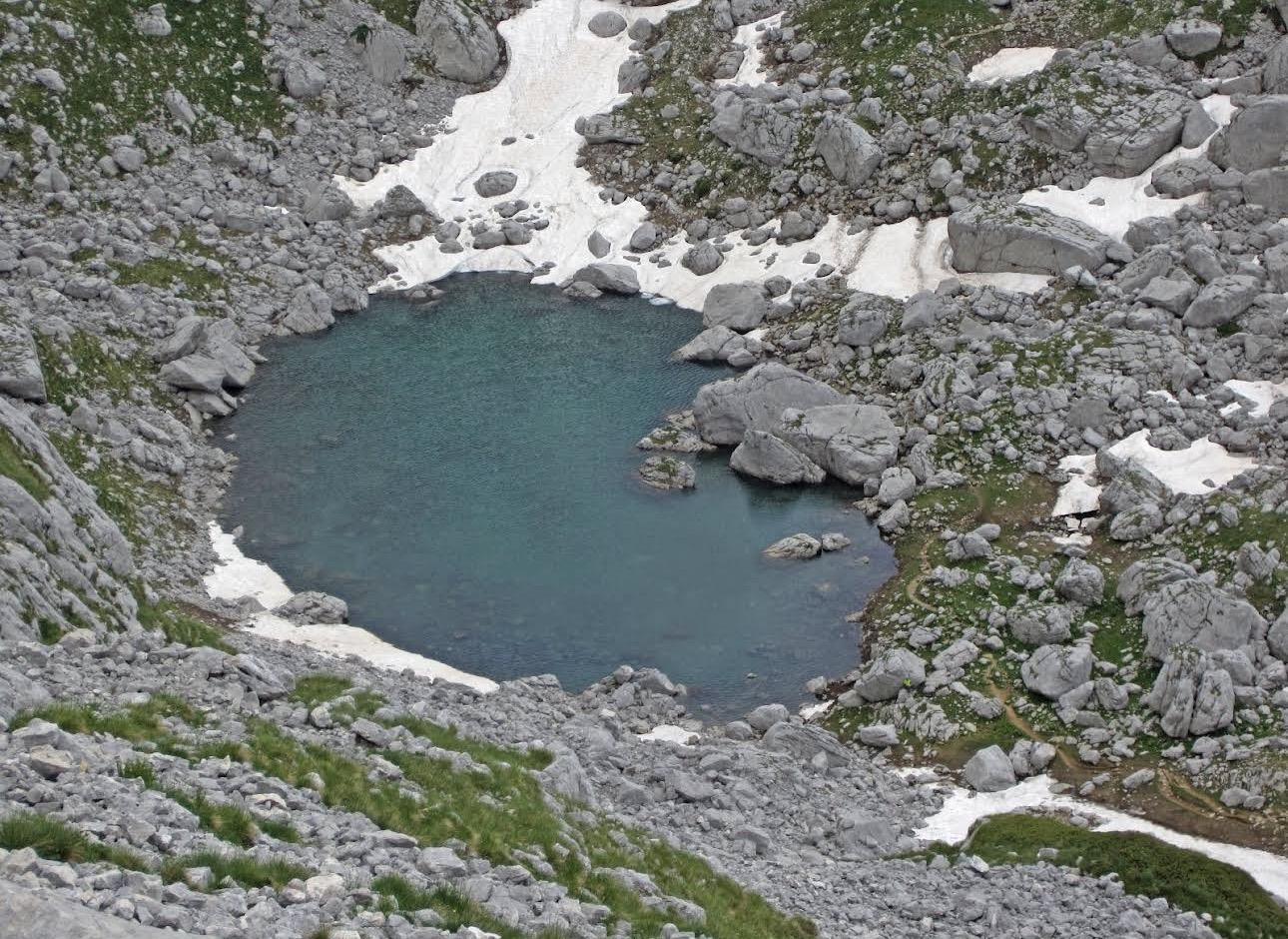
- Location in Durmitor National Park
- Location: Durmitor National Park, Montenegro
- Coordinates: 43°07′21″N 19°02′22″E
- Type: Periodic lake / Local depression
- Primary inflows: Precipitation and snowmelt
- Primary outflows: Infiltration and evaporation
- Basin countries: Montenegro
- Max. length: 50 m (160 ft)
- Max. width: 40 m (130 ft)
- Max. depth: 2 m (6 ft 7 in)
- Surface elevation: 2,028 m (6,654 ft)

Zeleni Vir (Serbo-Croatian: Zeleni Vir/Зелени вир) is a small periodic lake situated in the central part of Durmitor Massif within Durmitor National Park, Montenegro. Located at an elevation of 2,028 meters, it is found approximately 1 kilometer from Montenegro's highest peak, Bobotov Kuk.

== Geography and Hydrology ==
Zeleni Vir is a lenticular water body with a length of 50 meters, a width of 40 meters, and a maximum depth of 2 meters. The lake's water supply is dependent on precipitation and seasonal snowmelt. The spring near the lake is known to dry up during hot summer periods and may not refill until the following year. During dry seasons, the lake bed can be nearly empty.

== Hiking and Access ==
Zeleni Vir is a notable landmark on the popular hiking route to the summit of Bobotov Kuk (2,523 m). The most common trailhead is at the Sedlo mountain pass (1,907 m), which is accessible by car or taxi from Žabljak. The trail starts from Sedlo (near the Sedlena Greda Mountain), initially crossing grassy meadows before a steady ascent leads to the lake. Hikers pass through the valley of Surutka, which has a reliable water source. Zeleni Vir is located just off the main trail, and the best views are from the opposite side of the path. Beyond it, the trail continues with a steeper ascent toward theVelika Previja pass (2,351 m), where it converges with the route from Žabljak, before the final climb to the summit of Bobotov Kuk.
