= Stožina =

Mountain in Montenegro

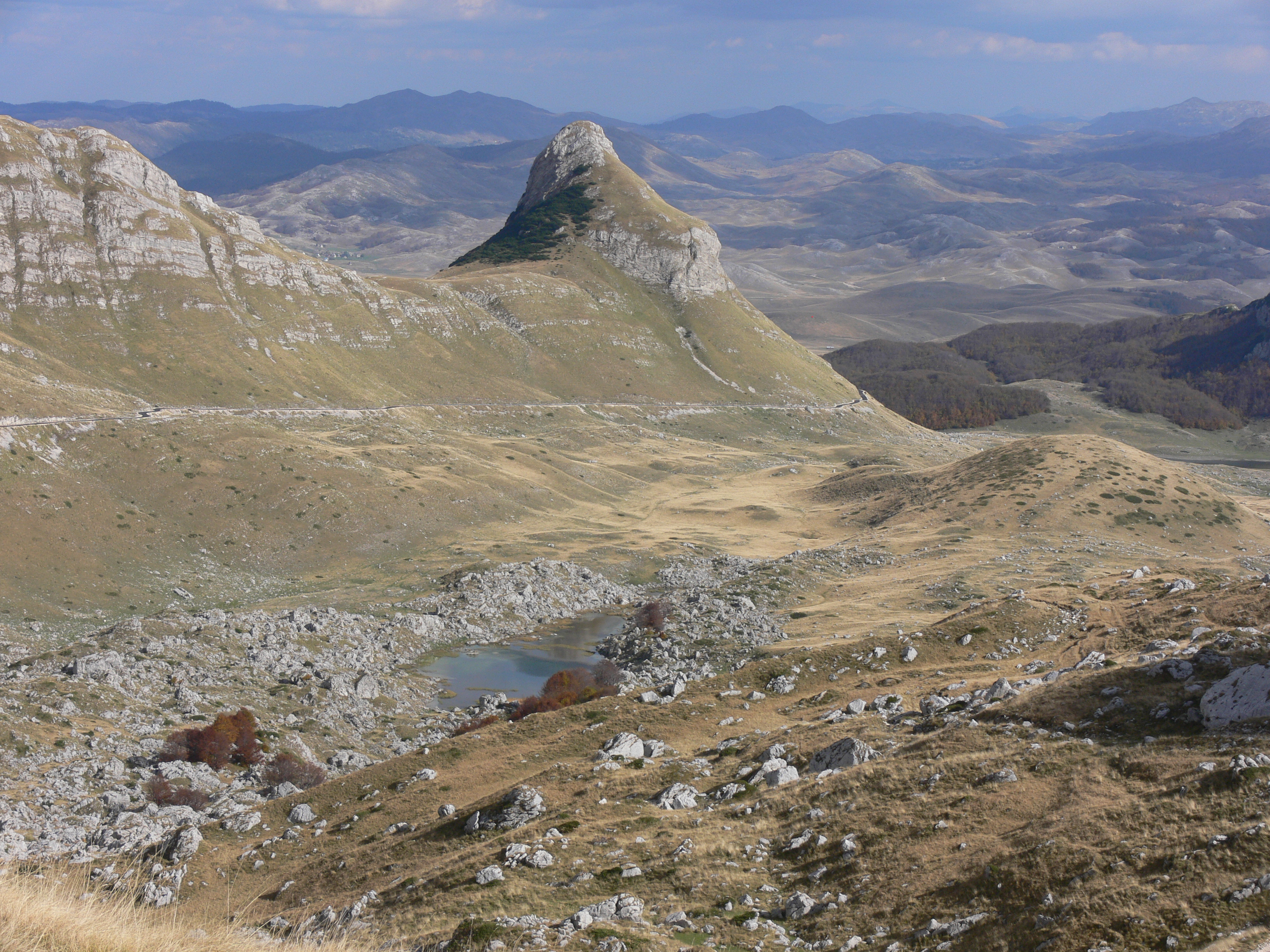

Highest point
- Elevation: 1,908 m (6,260 ft)
- Coordinates: 43°05′36″N 19°04′45″E

Geography
- Location within Montenegro
- Location: Montenegro
- Parent range: Durmitor (Dinaric Alps)

Stožina is a peak in the Durmitor mountain range in northern Montenegro. At 1,908 m (6,260 ft), it is not among the highest peaks in the range, but due to its iconic shape and location, it has become a well-known symbol of the area and the Durmitor National Park.
