= Zminje Lake =

Glacial lake in Montenegro

- Zminje Jezero / Змиње језеро (Serbo-Croatian)
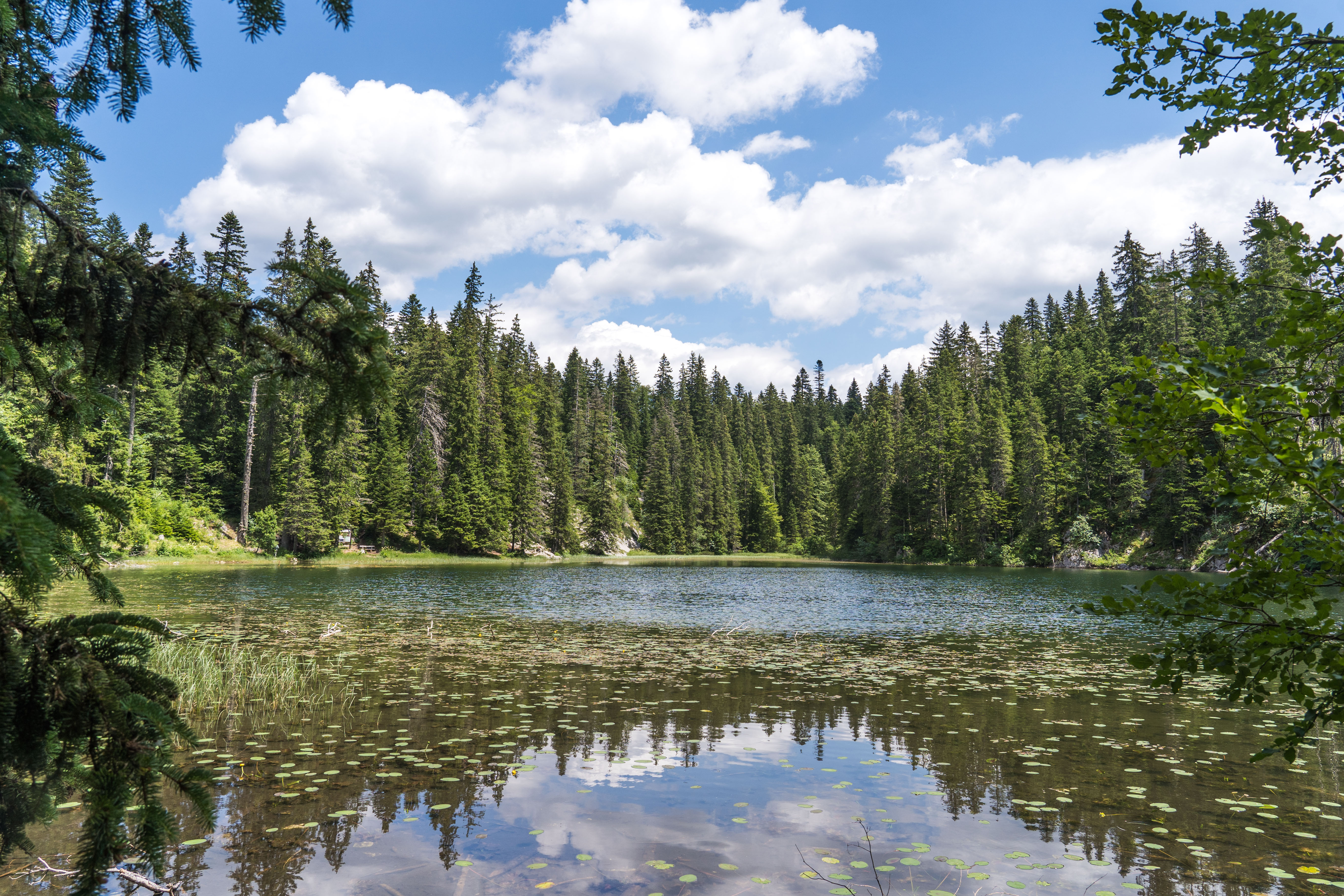
- Location in Durmitor National Park
- Location: Durmitor National Park, Montenegro
- Coordinates: 43.1554516°N 19.0701279°E
- Type: Glacial lake
- Primary inflows: Three small springs, precipitation and snowmelt
- Primary outflows: Sinking into a ponor and evaporation
- Basin countries: Montenegro
- Max. length: 230 m (750 ft)
- Max. width: 123 m (404 ft) (max)
- Surface area: 0.0167 km^{2} (0.0064 sq mi) (summer)
- Average depth: 2.5 m (8 ft 2 in) (avg)
- Max. depth: 7.7 m (25 ft)
- Water volume: 41,773 m^{3} (1,475,200 cu ft)
- Surface elevation: 1,495 m (4,905 ft) – 1,520 m (4,990 ft)

Zminje Lake (Serbo-Croatian: Zminje Jezero / Змиње језеро), meaning the Snake Lake, is a small glacial lake located in the Durmitor National Park in Montenegro. It is situated at the headwaters of the Mlinski Creek, below the slopes of Crvena Greda Mountain. The lake is surrounded by a dense, centuries-old forest of spruce and other conifers.

== Geography and Hydrology ==
The lake basin is of glacial origin, with its formation also influenced by tectonic activity and karst processes due to the underlying limestone terrain.
Water levels fluctuate seasonally, with high water in spring and autumn, but amplitudes are small as a ponor (sinkhole) at the lake's edge acts as a natural regulator. The lake is fed by three small springs, precipitation, and snowmelt. The water is cold, with surface temperatures around 11–15 °C in summer, and is characterized by high purity, a dark green color, and good transparency up to 4.2 meters.

== Name and Legend ==
The name "Zminje Jezero" translates to "Snake Lake". According to local legend, the area was once full of snakes. An early winter supposedly caused them to freeze and disappear, and when the snow melted, the lake formed, with the surrounding forest reflecting in the water like snakeskin. Other explanations suggest the name comes from the snake-like appearance of tree roots or branches on the shore, or from a historical abundance of snakes in the area.

== Tourism and Access ==
Zminje Lake is a popular hiking destination from Žabljak, reachable in about 1.5 to 2 hours on a trail. A well-marked trail (route 102) also connects it to the Black Lake, taking about 60–80 minutes. The trail follows the Mlinski Creek, past the ruins of old watermills. The lake can also be accessed by car via a forest road near the village of Bosača, followed by a short 5–7 minute walk.
