= Pitomine =

Pitomine Питомине
- Village
- Location within Montenegro
- Coordinates: 43.155311°N 19.099659°E
- Country: Montenegro
- Region: Northern
- Municipality: Žabljak

Population (2011)
  - Total: 128
- Time zone: UTC+1 (CET)
  - Summer (DST): UTC+2 (CEST)

Pitomine (Montenegrin Cyrillic: Питомине) is a village in the municipality of Žabljak, Montenegro.

== Demographics ==
According to the 2011 census, its population was 128.

Ethnicity in 2011
Ethnicity	Number	Percentage
Montenegrins	81	63.3%
Serbs	38	29.7%
other/undeclared	9	7.0%
Total	128	100%
