= Durmitor =

Massif in northwestern Montenegro

- Дурмитор
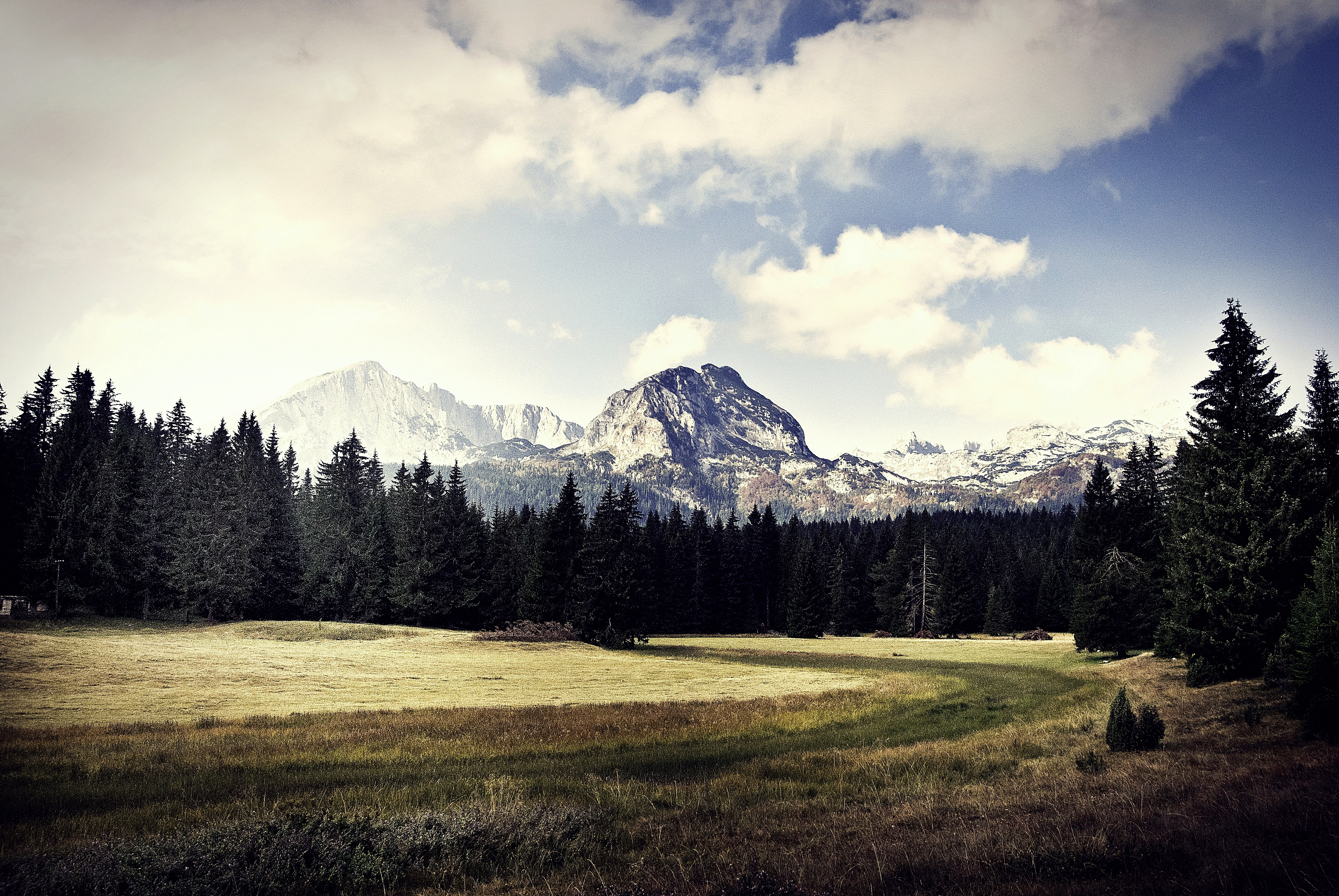

Highest point
- Elevation: 2,523 m (8,278 ft)
- Coordinates: 43°07′41″N 19°02′05″E

Geography
- Location within Montenegro
- Location: Montenegro
- Parent range: Dinaric Alps

Climbing
- First ascent: 1883

Durmitor (Montenegrin: Дурмитор, pronounced [durmǐtɔr] or [dǔrmitɔr]) is a massif located in northwestern Montenegro. It is part of the Dinaric Alps. Its highest peak, Bobotov Kuk, reaches a height of 2,523 meters (8,278 ft).

The massif is limited by the Tara River Canyon on the north, the Piva River Canyon on the west, and by the Komarnica River Canyon on the south. To the east, the Durmitor opens to a 1,500 m (4,921 ft) high plateau, called Jezerska površ (Plateau of Lakes). Mount Sinjavina is located to the east of the Jezerska površ plateau. The Durmitor is for the most part located in the Žabljak municipality.

The massif gives its name to the national park that comprises it. Durmitor National Park was founded in 1952 and designated as a World Heritage Site in 1980.

== Peaks ==
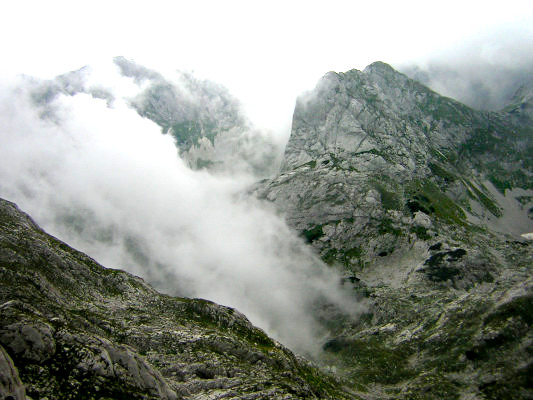
View of Durmitor near Minin Bogaz

The massif has 48 peaks above 2,000 meters (6,562 ft). Highest peaks are:

- Bobotov kuk 2,523 m (8,278 ft)
- Bezimeni vrh (Nameless Peak) 2,487 m (8,159 ft)
- Šljeme 2,455 m (8,054 ft)
- Istočni vrh Šljemena (East Peak of Sljeme) 2,445 m (8,022 ft)
- Soa / Đevojka 2,440 m (8,005 ft)
- Milošev tok 2,426 m (7,959 ft)
- Bandijerna 2,409 m (7,904 ft)
- Rbatina 2,401 m (7,877 ft)
- Lučin vrh 2,396 m (7,861 ft)
- Prutaš 2,393 m (7,851 ft)
- Minin bogaz 2,387 m (7,831 ft)
- Planinica 2,330 m (7,644 ft)
- Kobilja glava 2,321 m (7,615 ft)
- Savin Kuk 2,313 m (7,589 ft)
- Šupljika 2,310 m (7,579 ft)

== Lakes ==
Durmitor features 18 glacial lakes, scattered over mountain massif and Jezerska Površ plateau. The lakes add significantly to the beauty of the mountain, and have been nicknamed Gorske Oči, or "mountain eyes".

- Black Lake
- Veliko Škrčko Lake
- Malo Škrčko Lake
- Zeleni Vir
- Jablan Lake
- Valovito Lake
- Vir u Lokvicama
- Srablje Lake
- Modro Lake
- Suva Lokva
- Zminje Lake
- Barno Lake
- Pošćensko Lake
- Zabojsko Lake
- Vražje Lake
- Riblje Lake
- Miloševa Lokva
- Sušičko Lake

== Name ==
Durmitor National Park
- IUCN category II (national park)
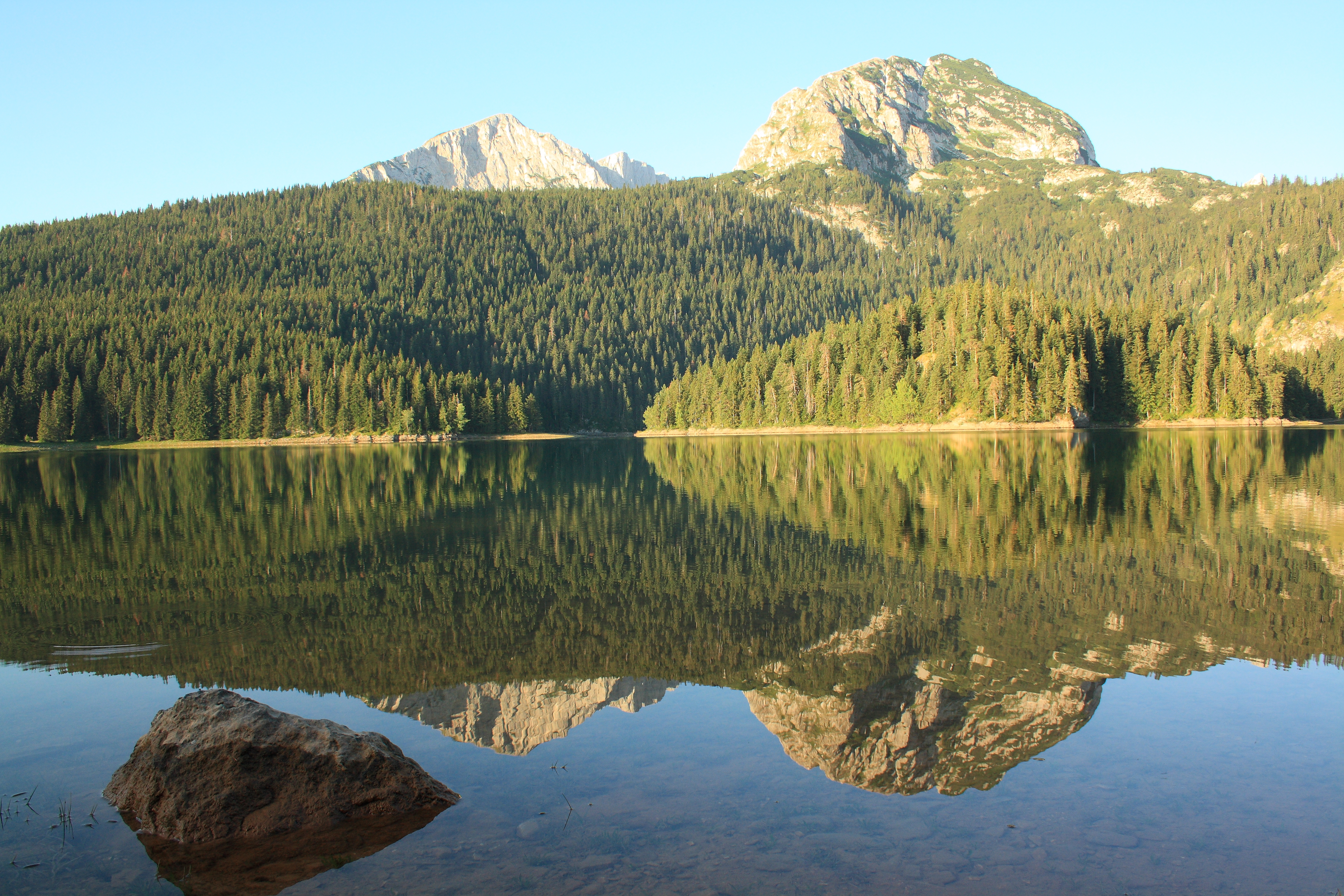
- Peaks of Durmitor Mt. over the Black Lake
- Interactive map of Durmitor National Park
- Location: Montenegro
- Nearest city: Žabljak
- Coordinates: 43.153198375177084°N 19.0368730920165°E
- Area: 32,100 ha (124 sq mi)
- Established: 1952
- Governing body: public
- World Heritage site: 1980
- Website: http://www.durmitornp.com/ ; https://nparkovi.me/parks/durmitor

One theory of the name Durmitor is that it is derived from Romanian, meaning 'sleeping place' (cognate with English dormitory) and was given by Romanian settlers in the middle age. There are similarly named mountains, such as Visitor (cf. visător 'dreamer') and Cipitor (cf. ațipitor 'sleeper') across the former Yugoslavia.

Another theory is that the name was given by the Celts, and the meaning would be anything from 'water from the mountain' to 'ridged mountain'. Considering the duration of time that the ancient Celts spent around these part and the Tara River (Tara is a Celtic goddess, as well), its name being of Celtic origin, it is very possible that Durmitor is a name of similar origin. Zeta river also has a Celtic origin name ("Loved one").

== National park ==
Durmitor National Park
UNESCO World Heritage Site
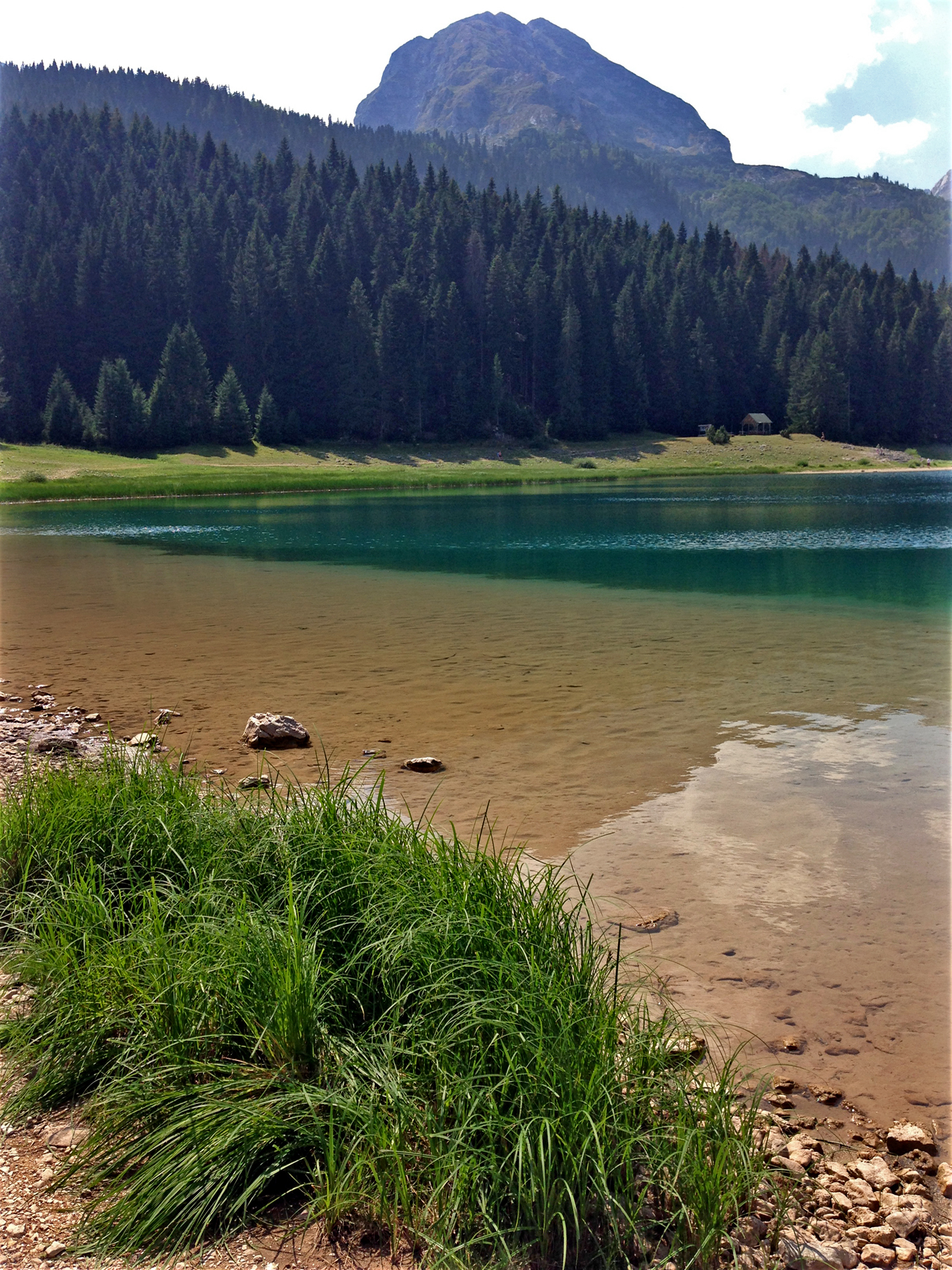

- Location within Montenegro
- Location: Montenegro
- Criteria: Natural: (vii)(viii)(x)
- Reference: 100bis
- Inscription: 1980 (4th Session)
- Extensions: 2005
- Area: 32,100 ha (79,000 acres)
- Coordinates: 43.153198375177084°N 19.0368730920165°E

Durmitor National Park, created in 1952, includes the massif of Durmitor, the canyons of Tara, Sušica and Draga rivers and the higher part of the canyon plateau Komarnica, covering an area of 390 square kilometers (150 sq mi). It is the largest protected area in Montenegro, and it was inscribed on the list of UNESCO World Heritage Sites in 1980.

At 80 kilometers (50 mi) long and 1,300 meters (4,300 ft) deep, the Tara River Canyon in Durmitor National Park is the deepest gorge in Europe.

== Tourism ==
Durmitor mountain is the centre of Montenegrin mountain tourism. The tourist facilities are concentrated around the town of Žabljak. In winter, the main activities on Durmitor are skiing and snowboarding. In summer, the activities shift to hiking, mountaineering and recreational tourism. Water sports are also practiced in the area. Some of the most prominent attractions of Durmitor mountain are 18 glacial lakes, the best known of which is the Black Lake and the mountain peak Stožina.

In December 2025, a fatal ski lift accident occurred at the Savin Kuk peak on Durmitor, killing one, and seriously injuring a second tourist. The authorities have opened an investigation.

== Gallery ==
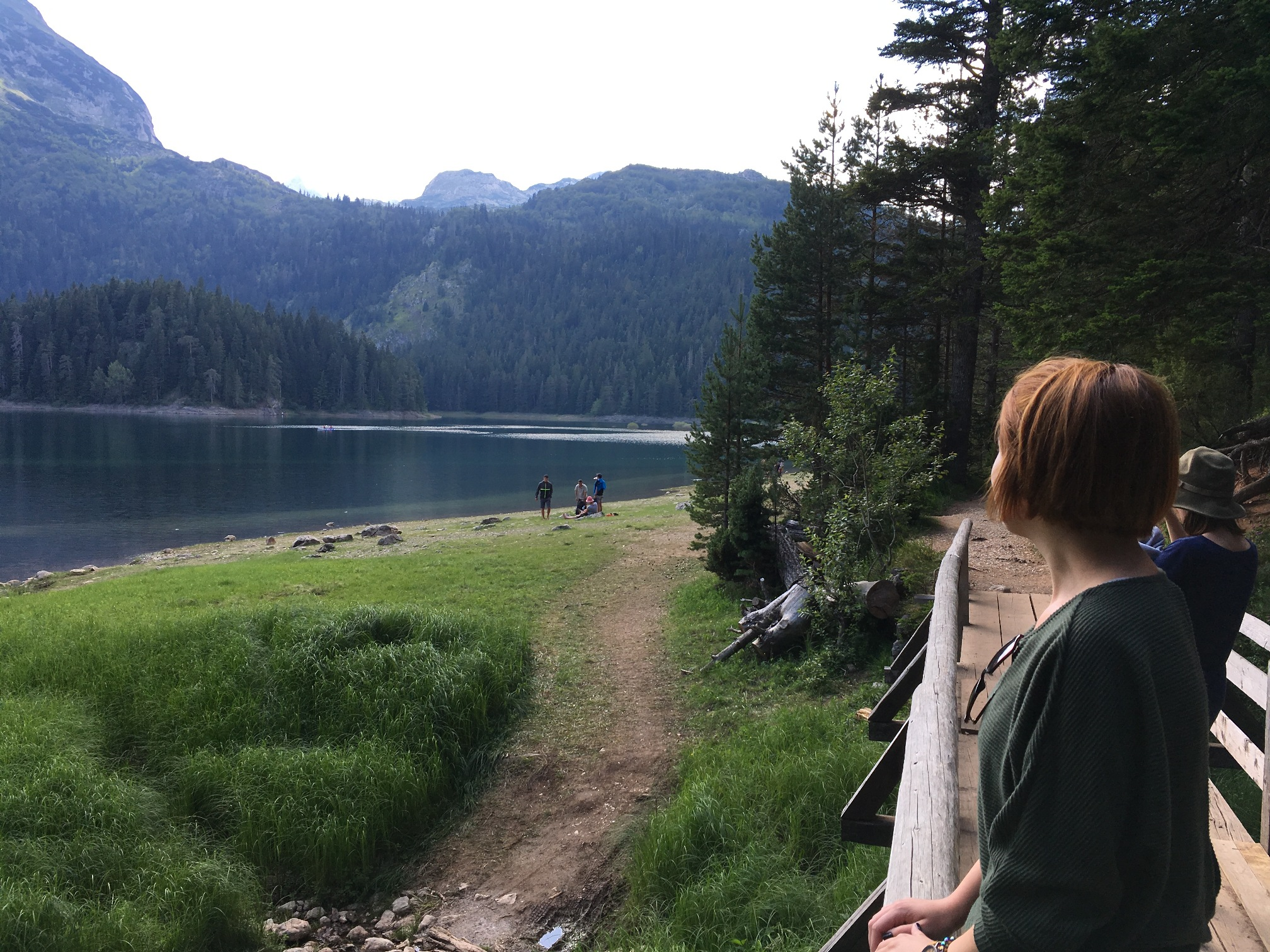
Durmitor national park

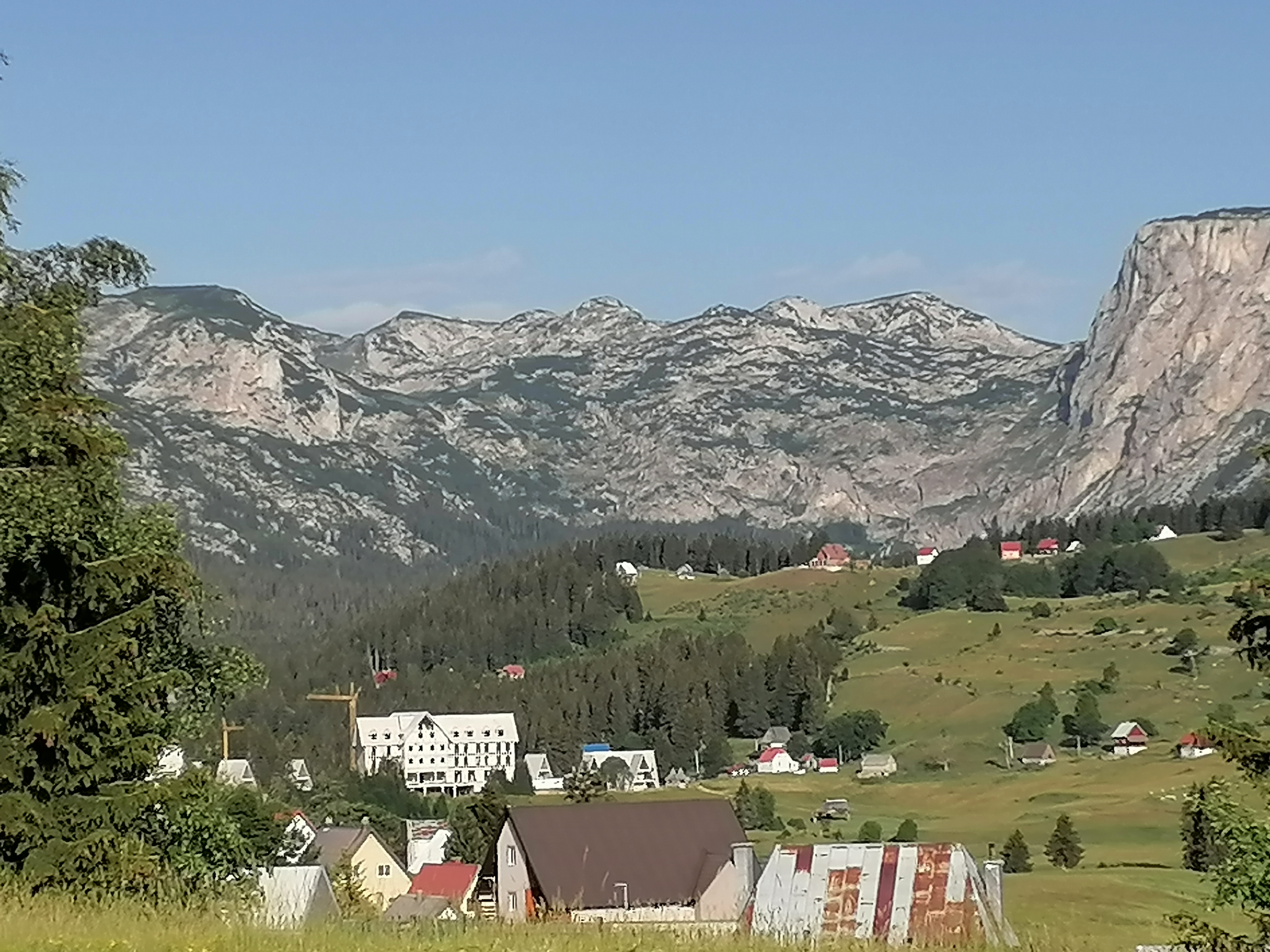

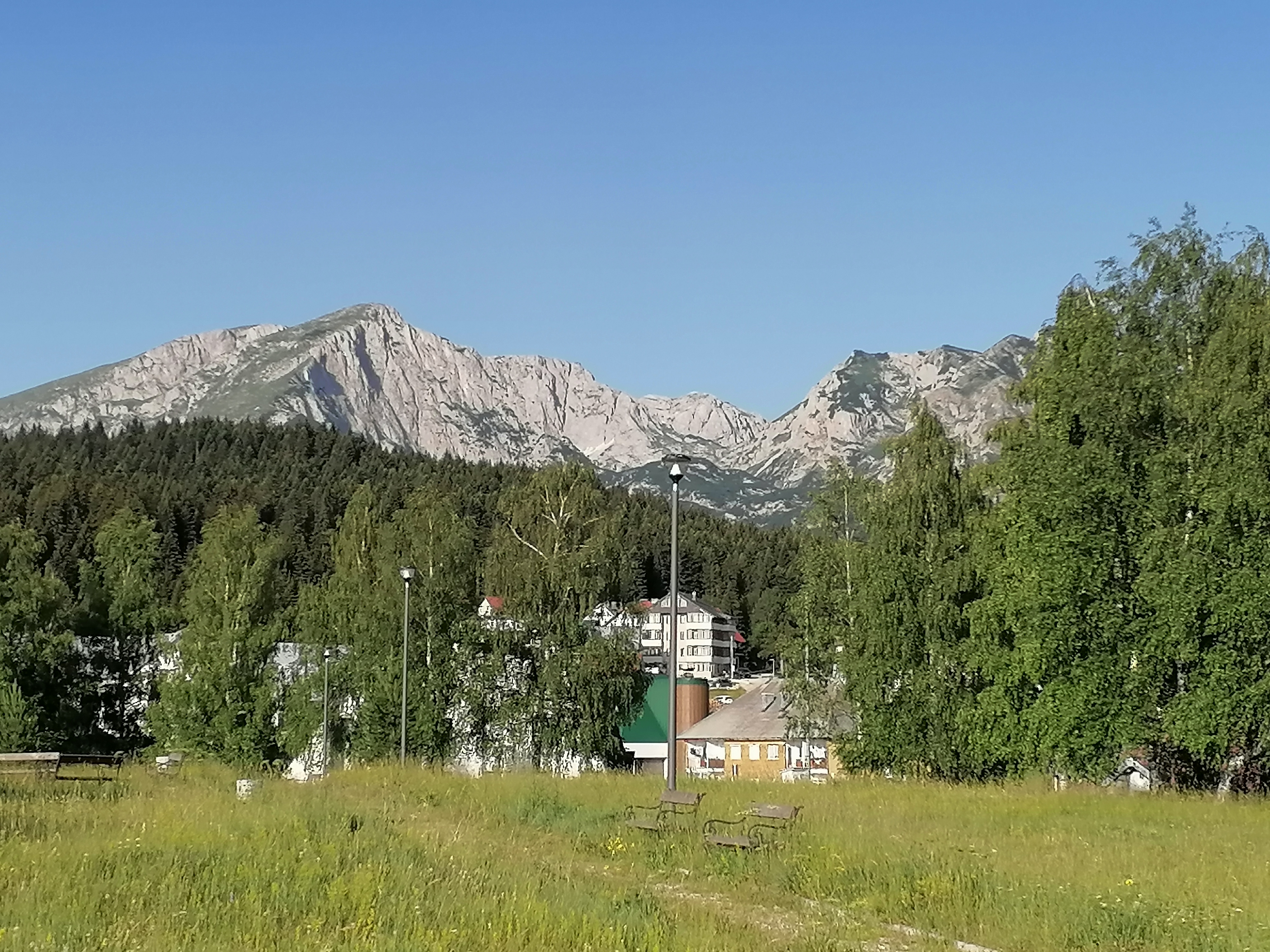

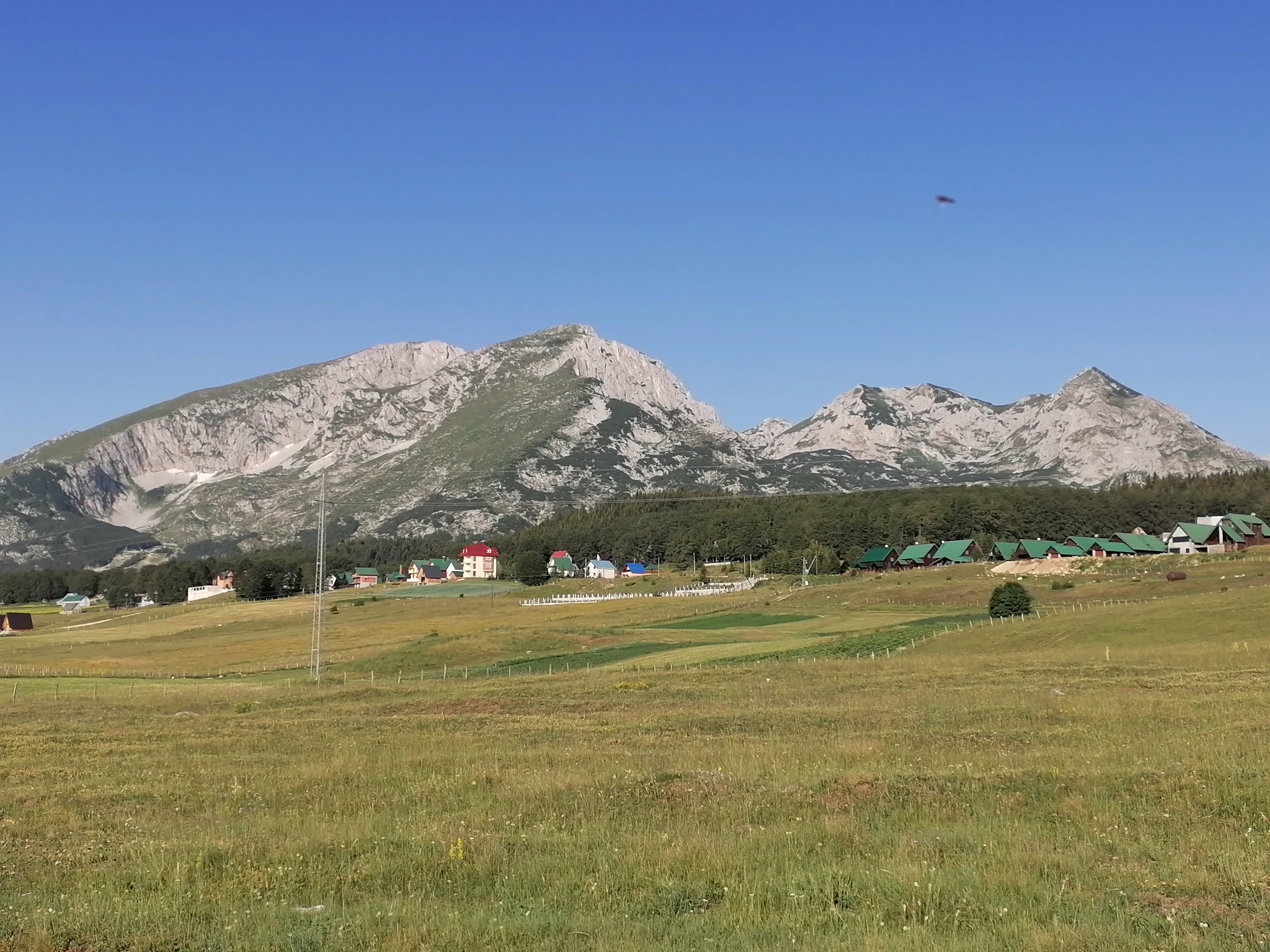

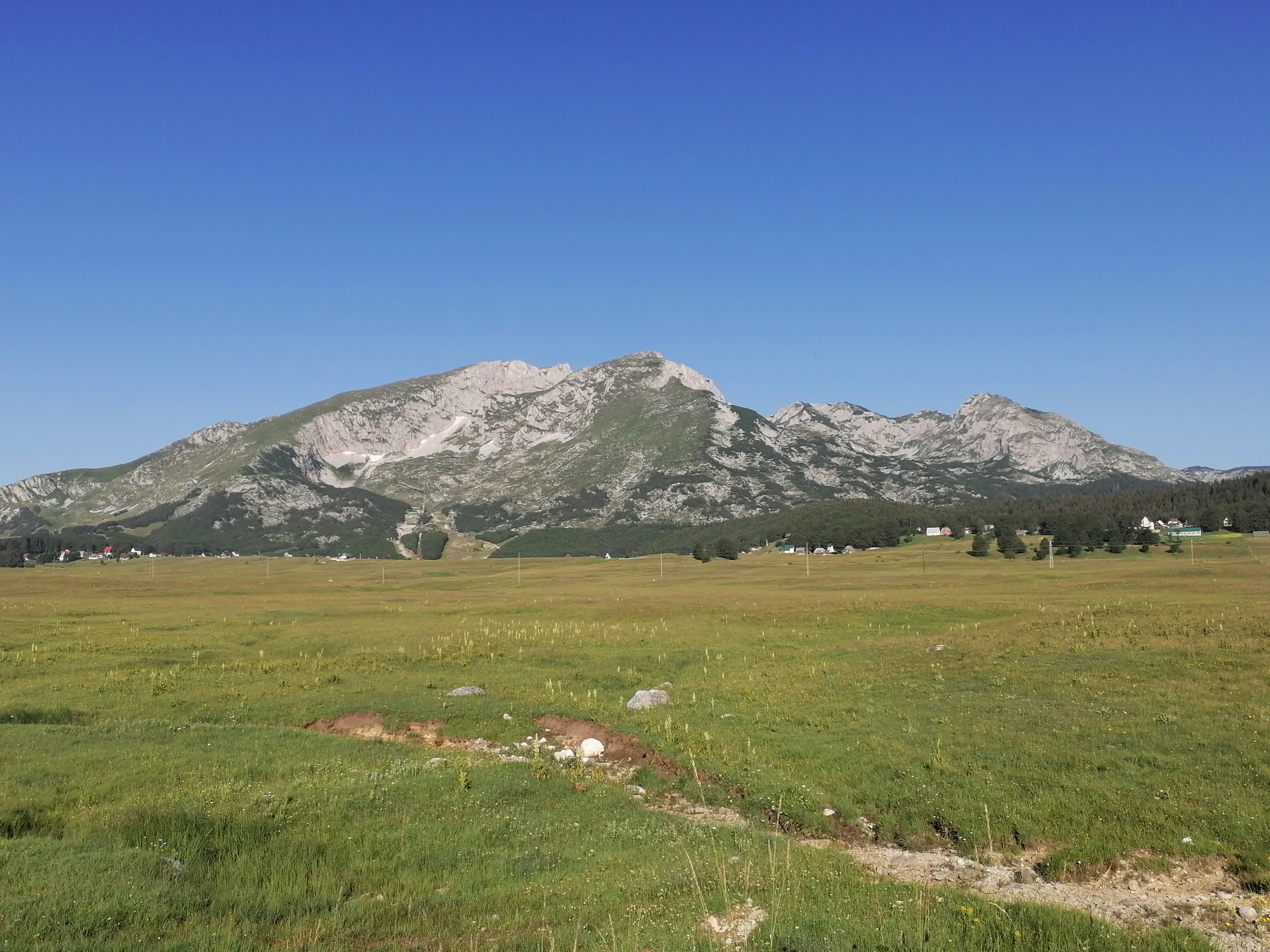

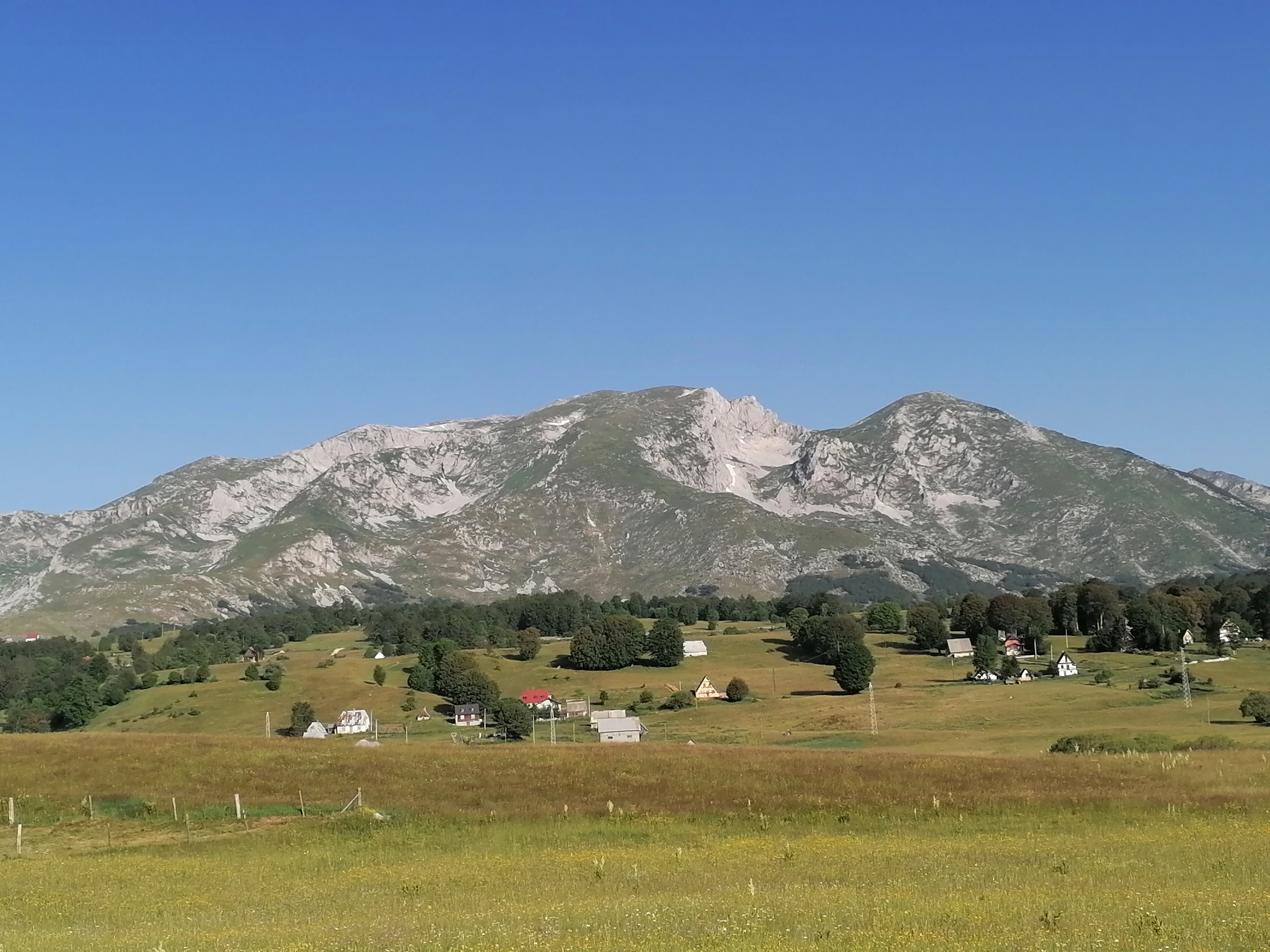

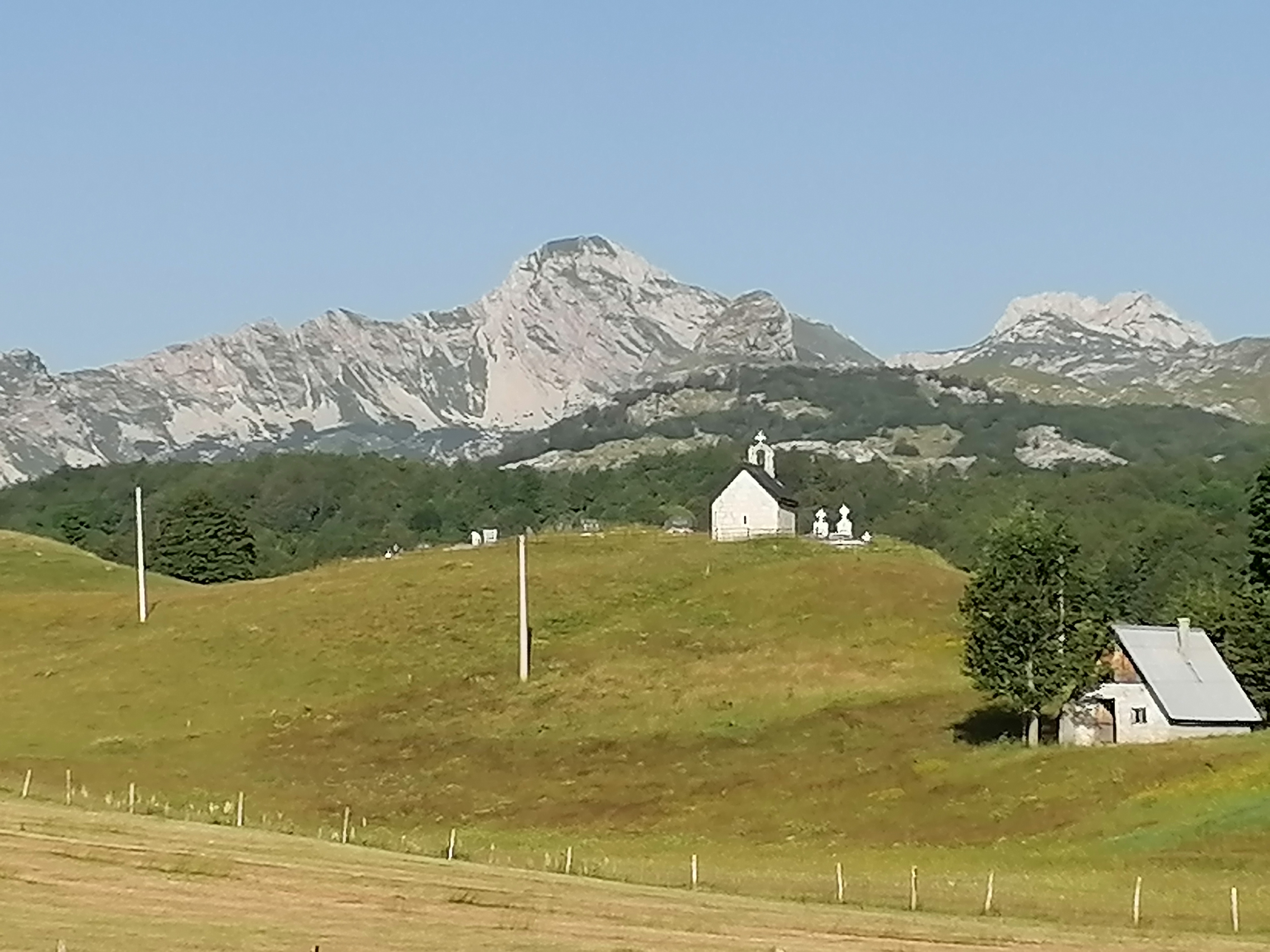

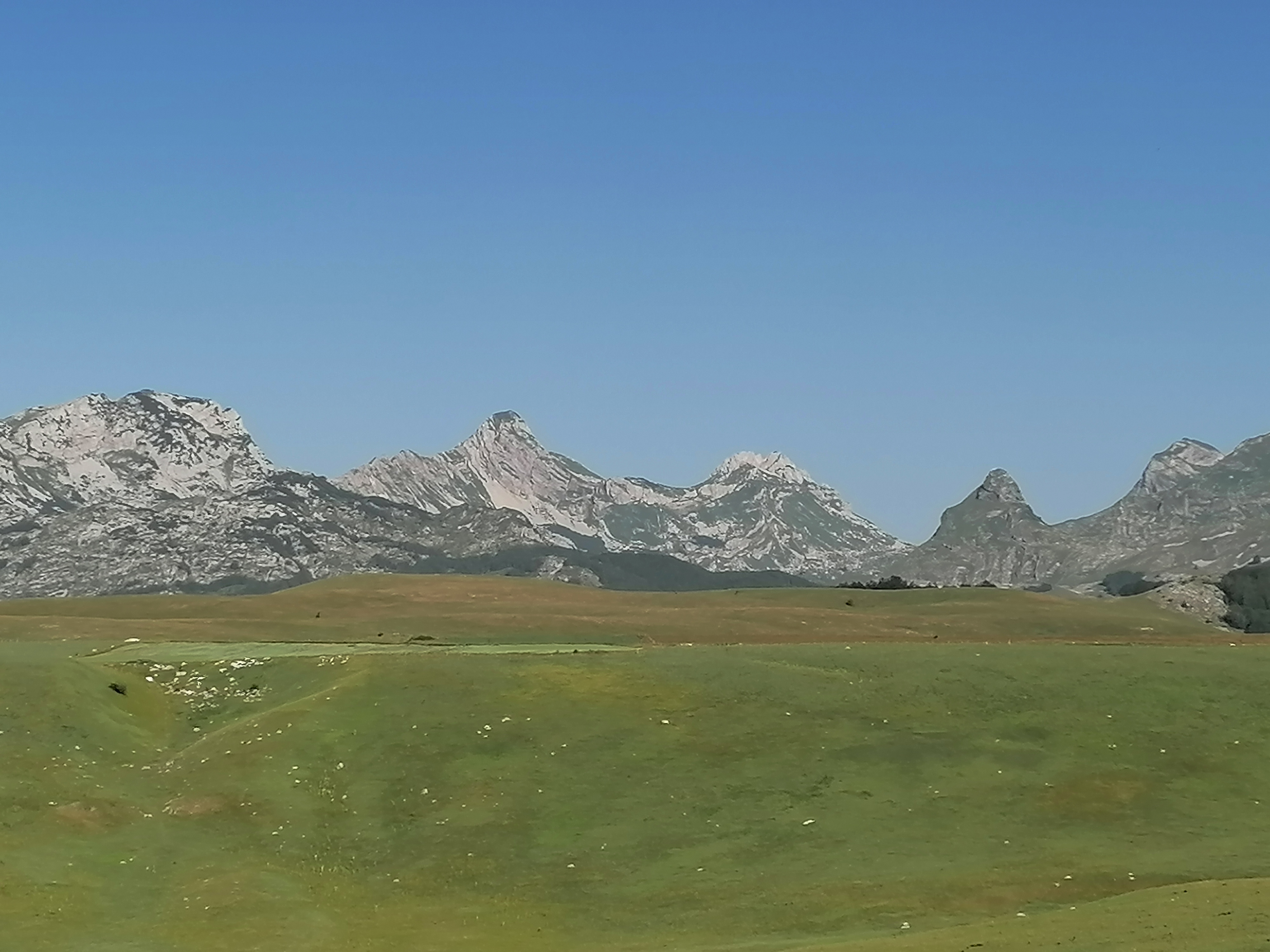

== Bibliography ==
=== Alpinism ===
- Poljak, Željko (February 1959). "Durmitor". Kazalo za "Hrvatski planinar" i "Naše planine" 1898—1958 (PDF). Naše planine (in Croatian). Vol. XI. p. 25. ISSN 0354-0650.

=== Biology ===
- Šašić, Martina; Nahirnić, Ana; Tarmann, Gerhard M. (2016-12-31). "Zygaenidae (Lepidoptera) in the Lepidoptera collections of the Croatian Natural History Museum". Natura Croatica: Periodicum Musei Historiae Naturalis Croatici. 25 (2): 233–248. doi:10.20302/NC.2016.25.19. eISSN 1848-7386.
