= Black Lake (Montenegro) =

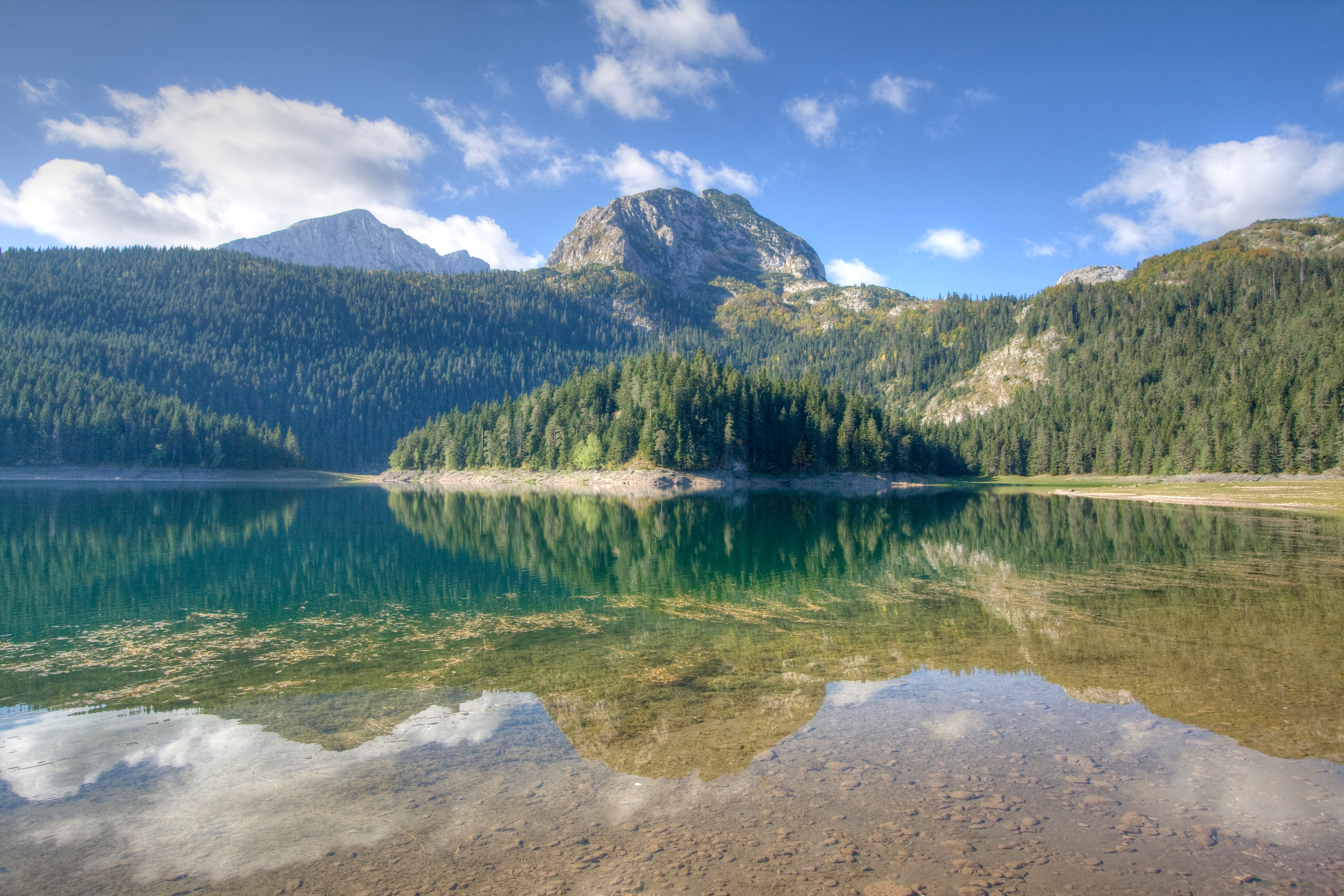
- Black Lake with Međed Peak

- Location within Montenegro
- Location: Žabljak, northern Montenegro
- Coordinates: 43°08′36″N 19°05′15″E
- Type: glacial lake
- Basin countries: Montenegro
- Surface area: Total: 0.515 km^{2} (0.199 sq mi); Big Lake: 0.338 km^{2} (0.131 sq mi); Little Lake: 0.177 km^{2} (0.068 sq mi)
- Max. depth: Little Lake: 49.1 m (161 ft); Big Lake: 24.5 m (80 ft)
- Surface elevation: 1,416 m (4,646 ft)

Black Lake (Montenegrin: Црно језеро, Crno jezero) is a lake in the Municipality of Žabljak in northern Montenegro. It is a glacial lake, located on Mount Durmitor, at an elevation of 1,416 m. It is 3 km from the town of Žabljak.

== Geography ==
Black Lake lies at the foot of Međed Peak and has an area of 0.515 square km. The lake consists of two smaller lakes: Big Lake (Veliko jezero) and Little Lake (Malo jezero). The lakes are connected by a narrow strait that dries up during the summer, creating two separate bodies of water.

- Big Lake has an area of 0.338 square km, maximum depth of 24.5 m, maximum length of 855 m, and maximum width of 615 m.
- Little Lake has an area of 0.177 square km, maximum depth of 49.1 m, maximum length of 605 m, and maximum width around 400 m.

The maximum length of Black Lake is 1,155 m. Little Lake actually has a greater volume because it is deeper.

Black Lake is filled by numerous mountain streams, the best known being Mlin Creek. Other streams have no name because they appear periodically, when snow from Mount Durmitor is melting. What is very rare/unusual is that the water flow between the two lakes reverses periodically. In summer, the water from Big Lake flows into Little Lake, and in winter from Little Lake into Big Lake. The subterranean effluents of the lake fork off into two rivers, Tara and Piva.

== Tourism ==
Black Lake is the premium tourist attraction of the Durmitor area. It is the largest and the best known of 18 glacial lakes on the mountain. The lake is easily accessible, as it is within walking distance from the center of the town of Žabljak.

A 3.5 km walking path circles around the entire lake, and it is a popular destination for recreation and hiking. NB. The path is crossed by streams in two places which can be challenging to cross. Many mountain trails lead from it to other smaller lakes around Žabljak. The Katun restaurant is located on the shore of the lake and serves traditional Montenegrin dishes.

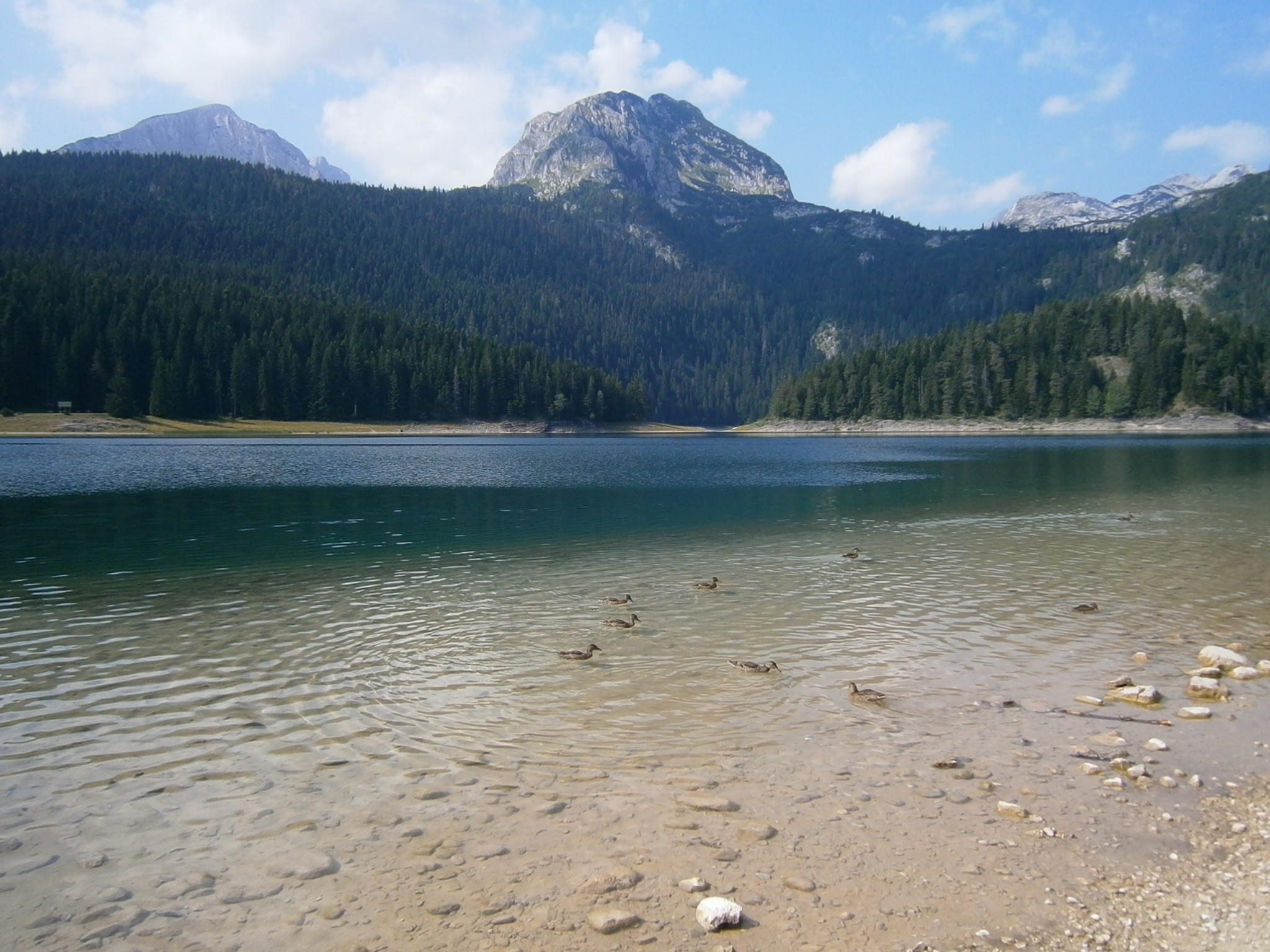
Big Lake

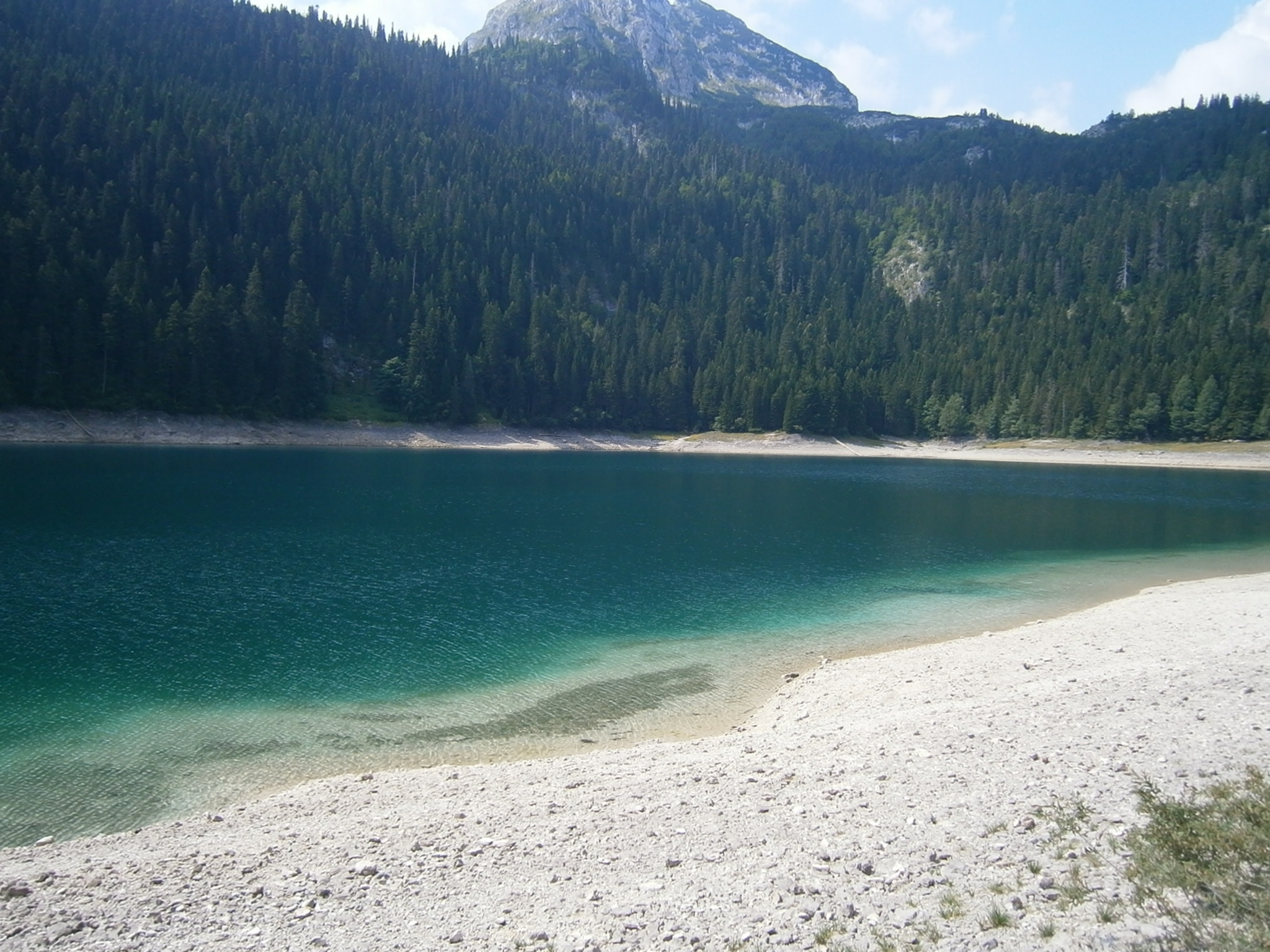
Little Lake

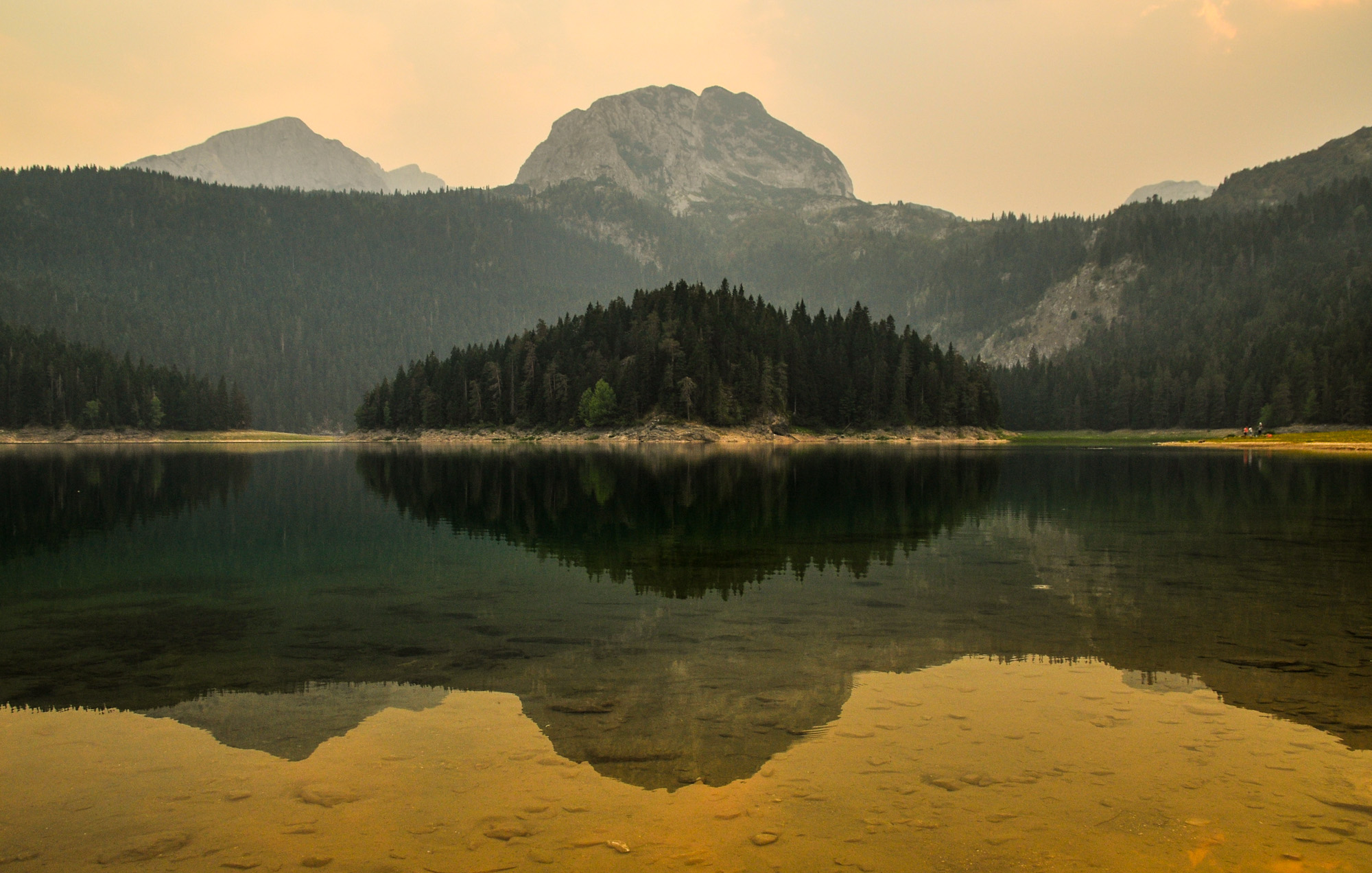
Black Lake
