= Škrčko Lakes =

Glacial lakes in Montenegro

- Шкрчка језера/Škrčka jezera (Serbo-Croatian)
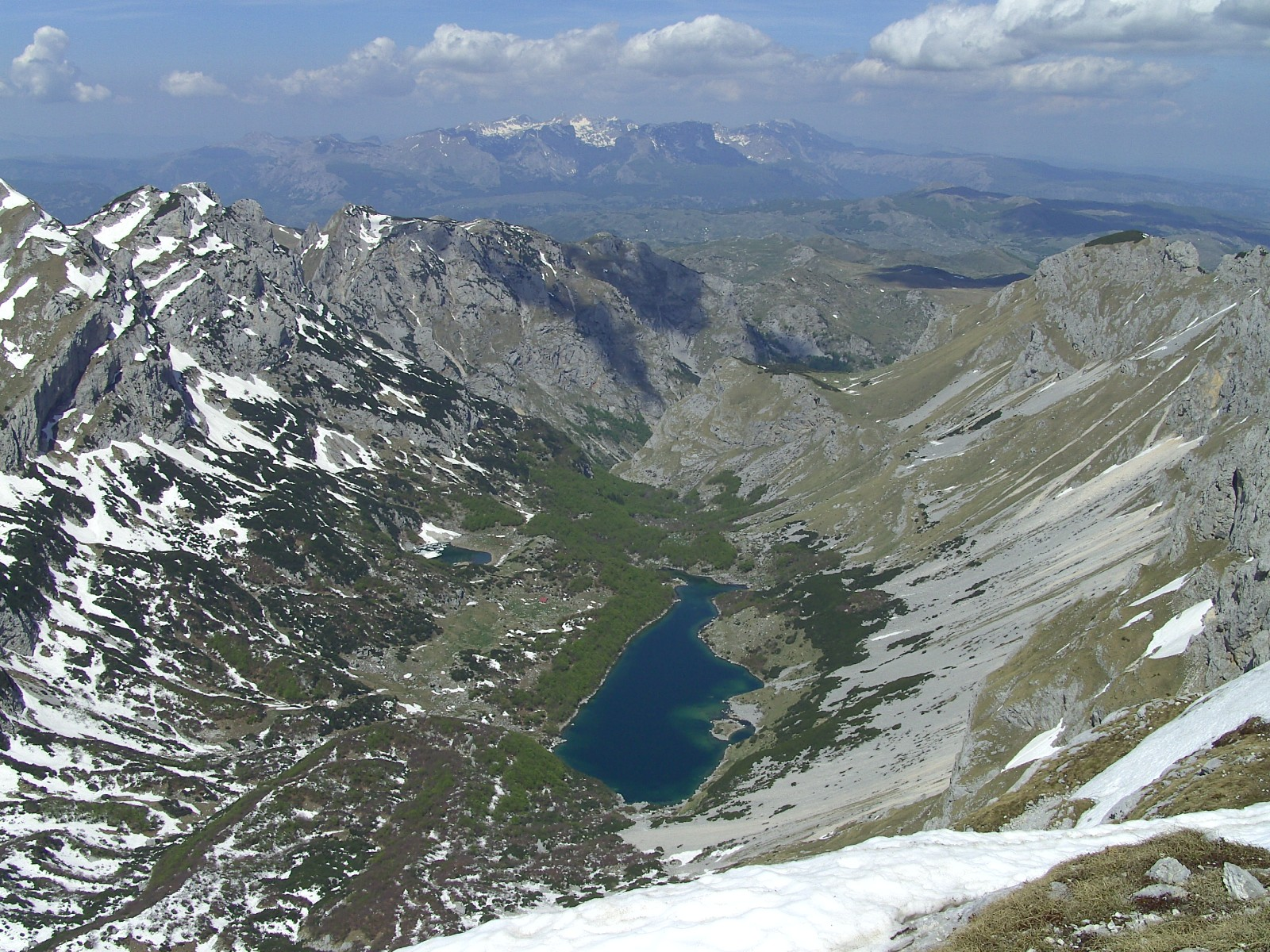
- Malo Škrčko Lake on the left, Veliko Škrčko Lake on the right
- Interactive map of the lakes
- Location: Durmitor National Park, Montenegro
- Coordinates: 43.1349221°N 19.0118304°E,
- Type: Glacial lakes
- Max. depth: 17.2 m (56 ft) (Veliko); 15.2 m (50 ft) (Malo)
- Water volume: 334,940 m^{3} (11,828,000 cu ft) (Veliko); 56,800 m^{3} (2,010,000 cu ft) (Malo)
- Surface elevation: 1,686 m (5,531 ft) (Veliko); 1,711 m (5,614 ft) (Malo)

The Škrčko Lakes (Serbo-Croatian: Шкрчка језера / Škrčka jezera) are two glacial lakes located in the Sušica Canyon within Durmitor National Park in northern Montenegro.

== Geography ==
The Škrčko Lakes lie in the Sušica Canyon, which is surrounded by some of Durmitor's highest and most dramatic peaks, including Bobotov Kuk, Bezimeni vrh, and Prutaš. Veliko Škrčko Lake is situated at an altitude of 1,686 metres, while Malo Škrčko Lake lies slightly higher at 1,711 metres, located directly at the foot of Prutaš Peak.

The basin of Malo Škrčko Jezero represents the deepest southwestern part of the Škrčko cirque and is partially dammed by moraine material on its northern side.

== Tourism and access ==
The Škrčko Lakes are a popular hiking destination within Durmitor National Park and are accessible via several trails. The most common approach is via the hike to Prutaš Peak from Dobri Do at Šarban, followed by a steep descent into the valley. Access to the Dobri Do trailhead is by car via the Durmitor Ring Road, approximately a 40-minute drive (19 km) from Žabljak. This full-day circuit is approximately 12.7 km, takes around 7 hours, and involves an elevation gain of about 1,140 m. An alternative and easier dedicated trail to the lakes starts at the same Dobri Do trailhead but proceeds directly to the Škrčko Ždrijelo pass and then descends into the valley, bypassing the summit of Prutaš. This route is often described as one of the easier hikes in Durmitor.

The lakes are also the terminus of the scenic Sušica Canyon Trail, which starts at Lake Sušica and passes the Skakala Waterfall. Furthermore, the Škrčko Lakes lie on the route of the long-distance Via Dinarica trail.

Between the two lakes stands the Planinarski dom Škrka, a basic mountain hut for hikers with freshwater spring is behind it.
