= Pruta =

Pruta (Hebrew: פרוטה) is the Hebrew term for a low-value coin, and it may refer to:

- Halachic prutah
- Israeli pruta

Prutas may refer to:

- Prutaš, a peak of the Durmitor massif in Montenegro
- Lake Prūtas, a lake on the Belarus–Lithuania border
