= Lake Sušica =

Seasonal lake in Montenegro

- Сушичко Jезеро / Sušičko Jezero (Montenegrin)
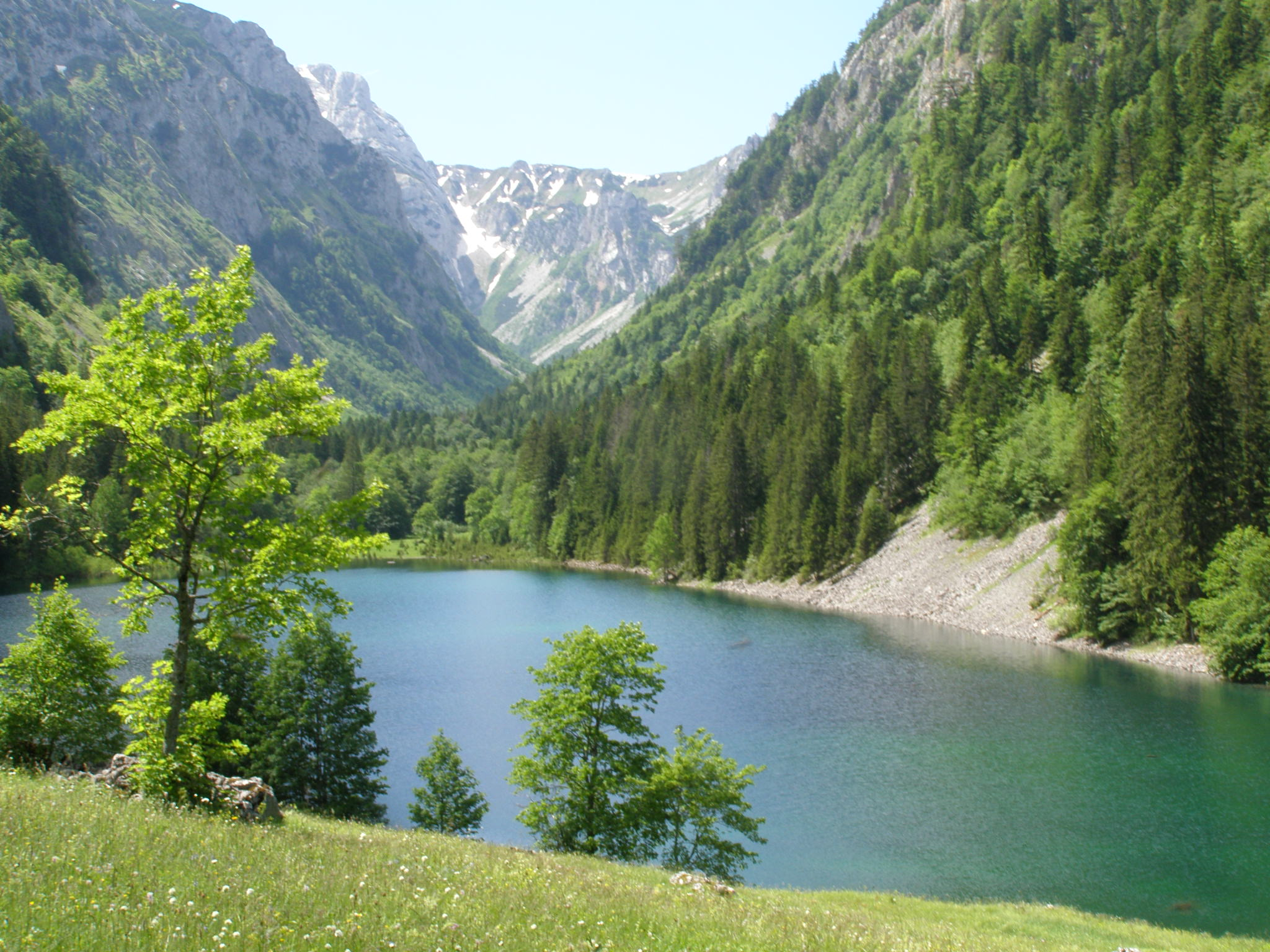
- Interactive map of the lake
- Location: Durmitor National Park, Montenegro
- Coordinates: 43°10′51″N 19°00′01″E
- Type: Seasonal glacial lake
- Max. length: c. 450 m (1,480 ft) (when full)
- Max. width: c. 200 m (660 ft) (when full)
- Surface area: c. 0.07–0.08 km^{2} (0.027–0.031 sq mi) (when full)
- Average depth: c. 4–5 m (13–16 ft)
- Max. depth: c. 7 m (23 ft)
- Water volume: c. 220,000 m^{3} (7,800,000 cu ft) (when full)
- Surface elevation: 1,140 m (3,740 ft)

Lake Sušica (Montenegrin: Сушичко језеро / Sušičko jezero) is a seasonal glacial lake located in the Sušica Canyon within Durmitor National Park in northern Montenegro.

== Geography ==
Lake Sušica lies at an altitude of 1,140 metres in the Sušica Canyon, which forms the western border of Durmitor National Park. The canyon itself, carved by intense glacial erosion, extends for approximately 14–15 km before intersecting with the Tara River canyon.

The lake is fed by the Sušica River and snowmelt from the Durmitor massif. When full, typically in spring, the lake is roughly elliptical, measuring about 350–450 metres in length and up to 200 metres in width, with an area of 70,000–80,000 m² and a volume of approximately 220,000 m³. The average depth is 4–5 metres, with some pockets reaching up to 7 metres.

With the progression of summer, lake's water infiltrates the ground through ponors (sinkholes) in the lakebed, causing the lake to dry up entirely and reveal a flat floor covered in verdant vegetation, which is used for haymaking. This cycle has led the Sušica River (and by extension, the lake) to be named from the word "suša", meaning drought.

== Tourism ==
The lake serves as the trailhead for the popular Sušica Canyon Trail, which leads hikers through beech forests, past the Skakala Waterfall, and up to the Škrčko Lakes valley, home to the renowned Veliko Škrčko Jezero. This trail is part of the long-distance Via Dinarica route.

Access to the lake is by car via the Durmitor Ring Road from Žabljak, a journey of about 24 km that takes roughly an hour due to narrow, winding mountain roads. There is a parking area and a hiker's hut (Sušica Hut) at the site. The nearest settlement is the small hamlet of Mala Crna Gora.
