= Motički Gaj =

Motički Gaj Мотички Гај
- Village
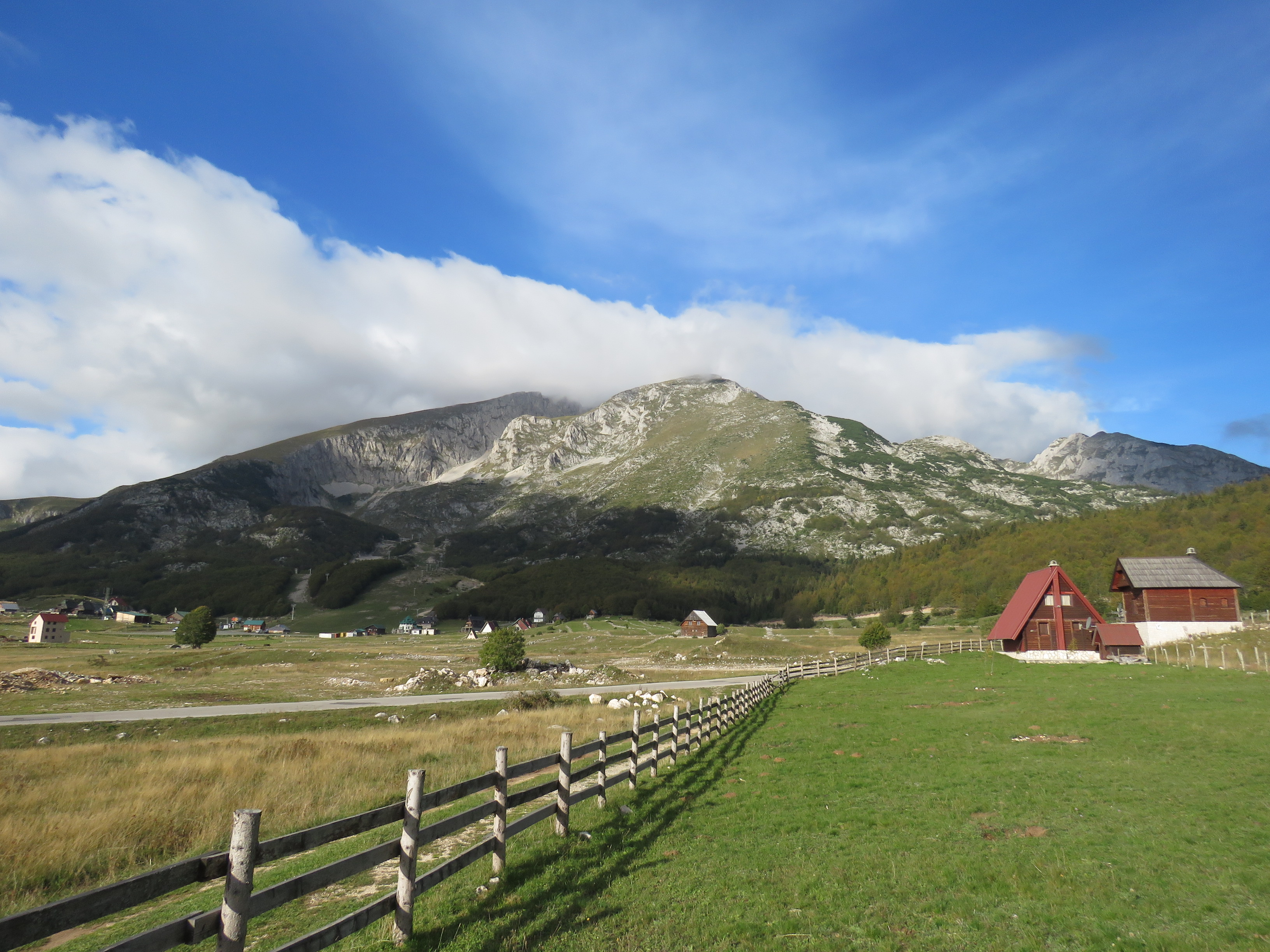
- Motički Gaj overlooking Savin Kuk

- Location within Montenegro
- Coordinates: 43.132091°N 19.111297°E
- Country: Montenegro
- Region: Northern
- Municipality: Žabljak

Population (2011)
  - Total: 156
- Time zone: UTC+1 (CET)
  - Summer (DST): UTC+2 (CEST)

Motički Gaj (Montenegrin Cyrillic: Мотички Гај) is a village in the municipality of Žabljak, Montenegro.

== Demographics ==
According to the 2011 census, its population was 156.

Ethnicity in 2011
Ethnicity	Number	Percentage
Serbs	75	48.1%
Montenegrins	70	44.9%
other/undeclared	11	7.1%
Total	156	100%
