= Prutaš =

Mountain peak in Montenegro

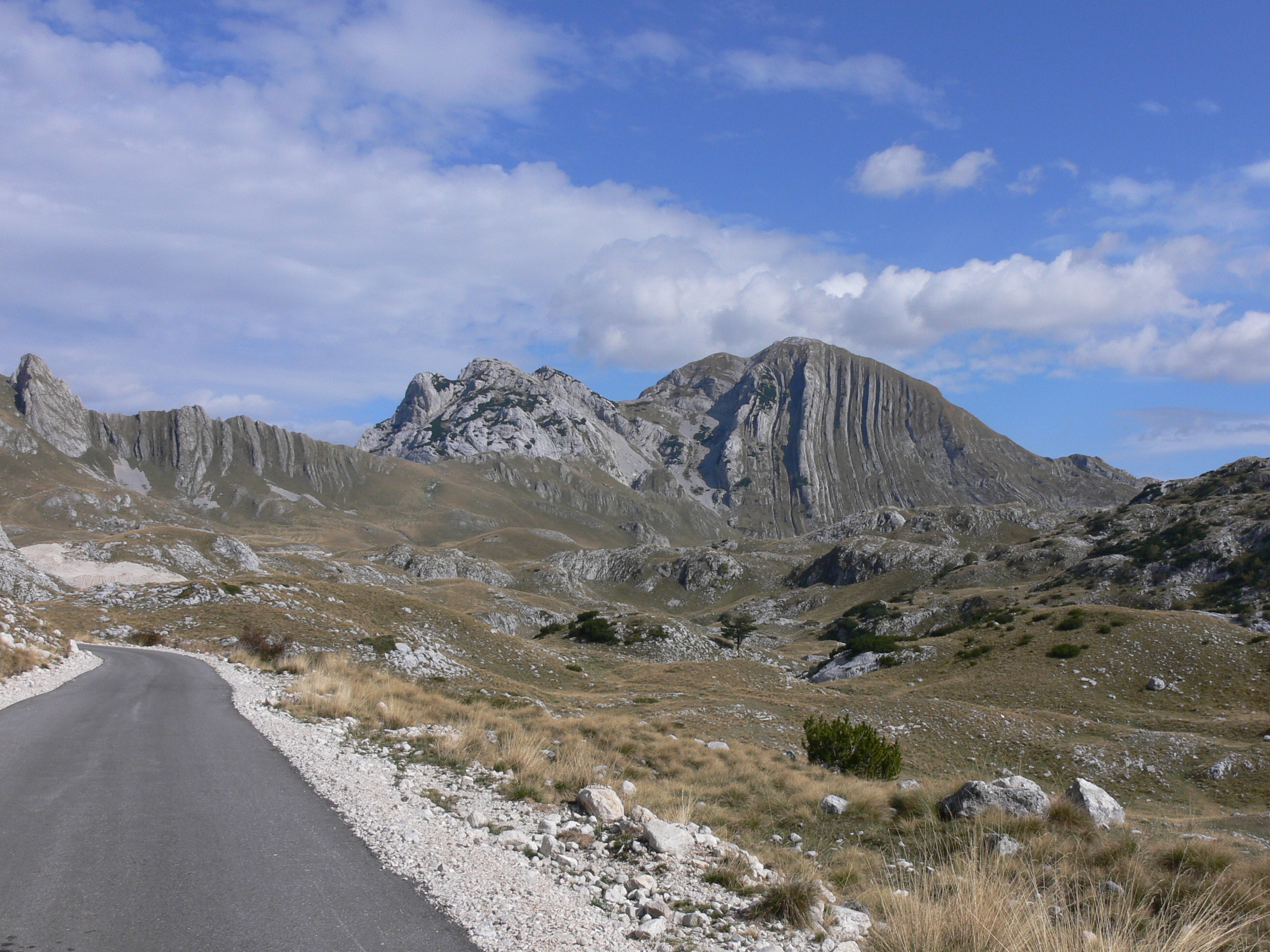

Highest point
- Elevation: 2,393 m (7,851 ft)
- Prominence: 318 m (1,043 ft)
- Isolation: 2.46 km (1.53 mi)
- Coordinates: 43°07′37″N 19°00′05″E

Naming
- English translation: Mountain of twigs
- Language of name: Serbo-Croatian

Geography
- Location: Durmitor National Park, Montenegro
- Parent range: Dinaric Alps

Prutaš is a mountain peak in Durmitor Massif with an elevation of 2,393 meters (7,851 ft). It is noted for its distinctive appearance characterized by vertical sedimentary rock layers and is considered one of the premier viewpoints in the Durmitor National Park.

== Etymology ==
The name "Prutaš" derives from the Montenegrin word "Prutovi," meaning twigs or branches referring to its unique, streaked facade of layered cliffs that resemble stacked twigs.

== Geography and Description ==
To the north of the Prutaš is the peak Gruda (2,302 m), from which it is separated by the Ilin Do pass (2,230 m). Together, Prutaš and Gruda form the southern end of the crest defining the western side of the Sušica Canyon. Its notable 700-meter-high north face dominates the Škrka Lakes Valley to the northeast, which contains Big Lake Škrka and Small Lake Škrka.

The vista from the summit encompasses the highest peaks of Durmitor, including Bobotov Kuk (2,523 m) and Bezimeni Vrh (2,487 m), which form part of the "Soa Nebeska" (Altar of the Sky) wall, the Sušica Canyon, the Škrka Lakes Valley, and on clear days, distant ranges and the Adriatic Sea.

== Hiking and Access ==
Prutaš is a popular hiking destination with multiple ascent routes.

- The Dobri Do/Šarban route (southern approach) is the most commonly used and considered moderate. It is an 8 km out-and-back hike with approximately 700 meters of elevation gain, taking about 4–5.5 hours.
- The Todorov Do route (western approach) is shorter (approx. 1.7 km one-way) but significantly steeper and more difficult.

The trailheads are accessible via the P14 road (part of the Durmitor Ring Road), approximately a 40-minute drive from Žabljak.

== Legend ==
A local legend explains the mountain's origin. It tells of a handsome shepherd named Todor who lived in the valley below. Mountain fairies, jealous of his love for a mortal woman named Ružica, invited him to dance on the condition he brought no weapons. Todor accidentally brought his shepherd's knife. Enraged, the fairies threw him from the clouds; where he fell, he created the nearby peak Gruda.

The village shepherds, seeking revenge, wove a giant ladder from branches ("prutovi") to reach the fairies' abode. They found the fairies sleeping, tied their magical golden hair to a large black stone, and pushed it off the mountain. The fairies' hair was torn out, robbing them of their power, and they fled into a cave. The branches of the ladder and the shepherds' sticks petrified over time, forming the characteristic layered cliffs of Prutaš, while the fairies' hair is said to have become the golden grasses or flowers on its slopes.
