= Durmitor Ring =

Scenic mountain road loop in Montenegro

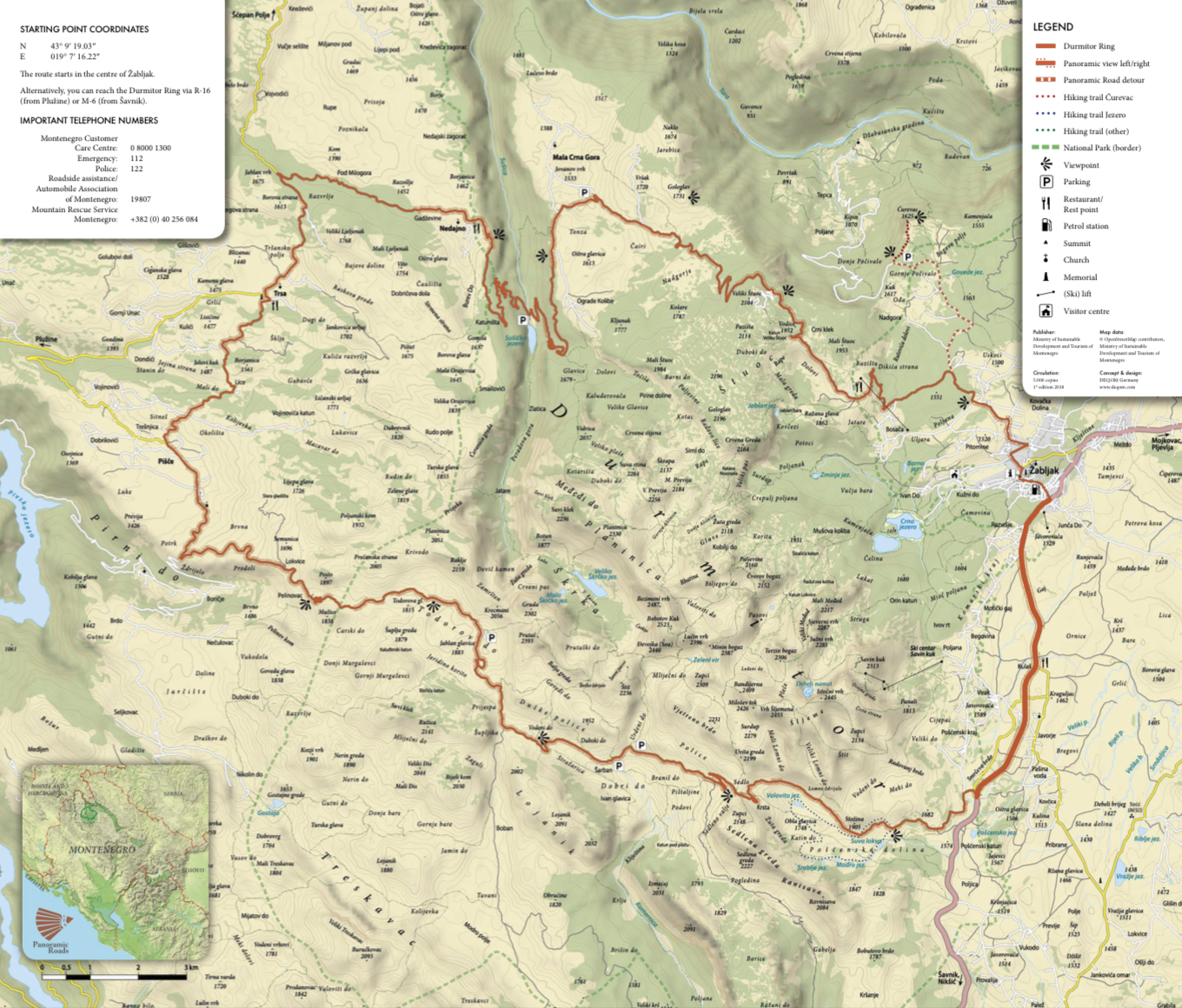

Route information
- Length: 76 km (47 mi)

The Durmitor Ring (Serbo-Croatian: Durmitorski Prsten) is a scenic mountain road loop in northern Montenegro, encircling parts of the Durmitor massif. It is designated as one of Montenegro's official "Panoramic Roads".

== Route description ==
The 76-kilometer (47-mile) loop begins and ends in the town of Žabljak, the highest town in the Balkans and the main gateway to Durmitor National Park. The road is fully paved but narrow, winding, and features steep inclines and descents, reaching a maximum elevation of approximately 1,950 meters (6,400 feet) at the Štuoc mountain pass.

Key viewpoints and landmarks along the route include: the villages of Mala Crna Gora, Trsa, and Pišče; peaks like Ćurevac, Prutaš and Savin Kuk; mountains including Crvena Greda and Sedlena Greda; valleys like Tara River Canyon, Sušica Canyon and Pošćenska Valley, and crosses Sedlo Pass, the highest road pass in Montenegro at 1,907 meters.

== Tourism and access ==
The road is primarily used for sightseeing and provides access to trailheads for hikes to peaks such as Bobotov Kuk, Prutaš, and Sedlena Greda. It is considered a difficult route for mountain biking, with 76 km of distance and significant elevation gain.

The recommended time to travel is between late May and October, as winter snow closes the road. The standard direction of travel is counter-clockwise, though the clockwise direction is recommended for campervans. The route is not suitable for large campers or vehicles longer than 7 meters and the only fuel station along the route is in Žabljak.

== Gallery ==
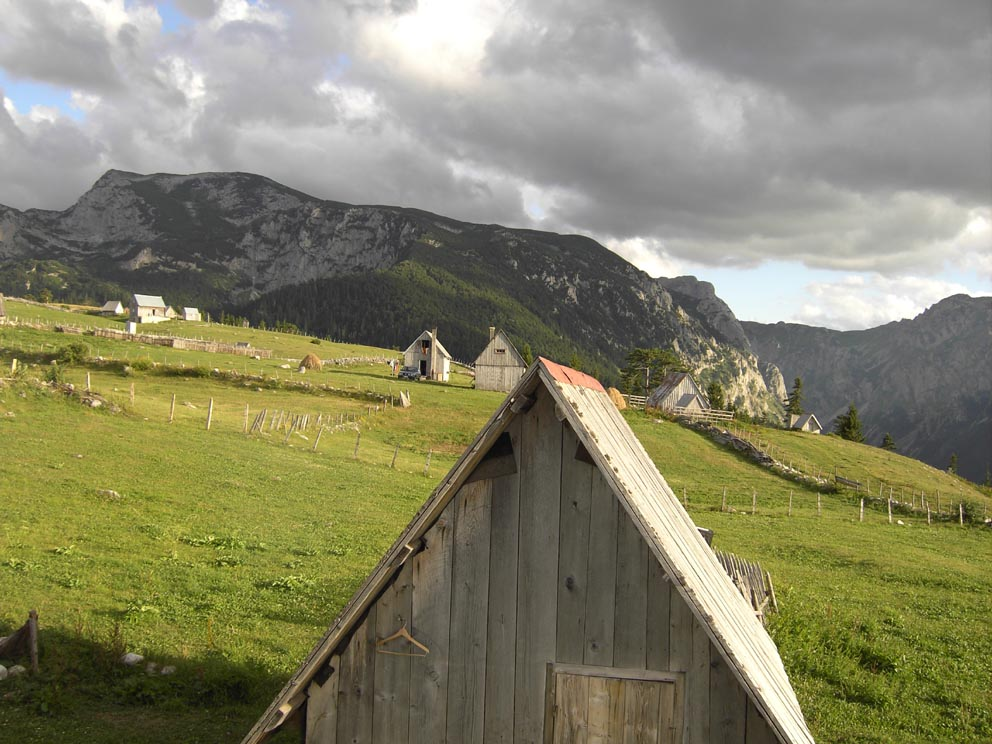
Mala Crna Gora

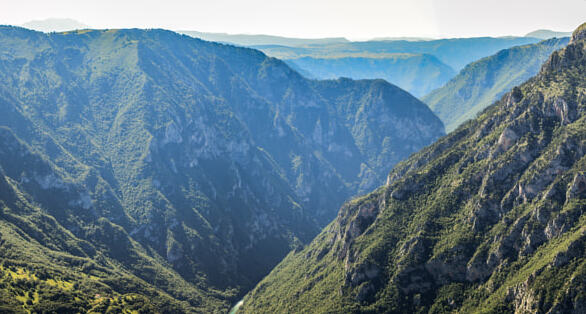
Čurevac Viewpoint of Tara River Canyon

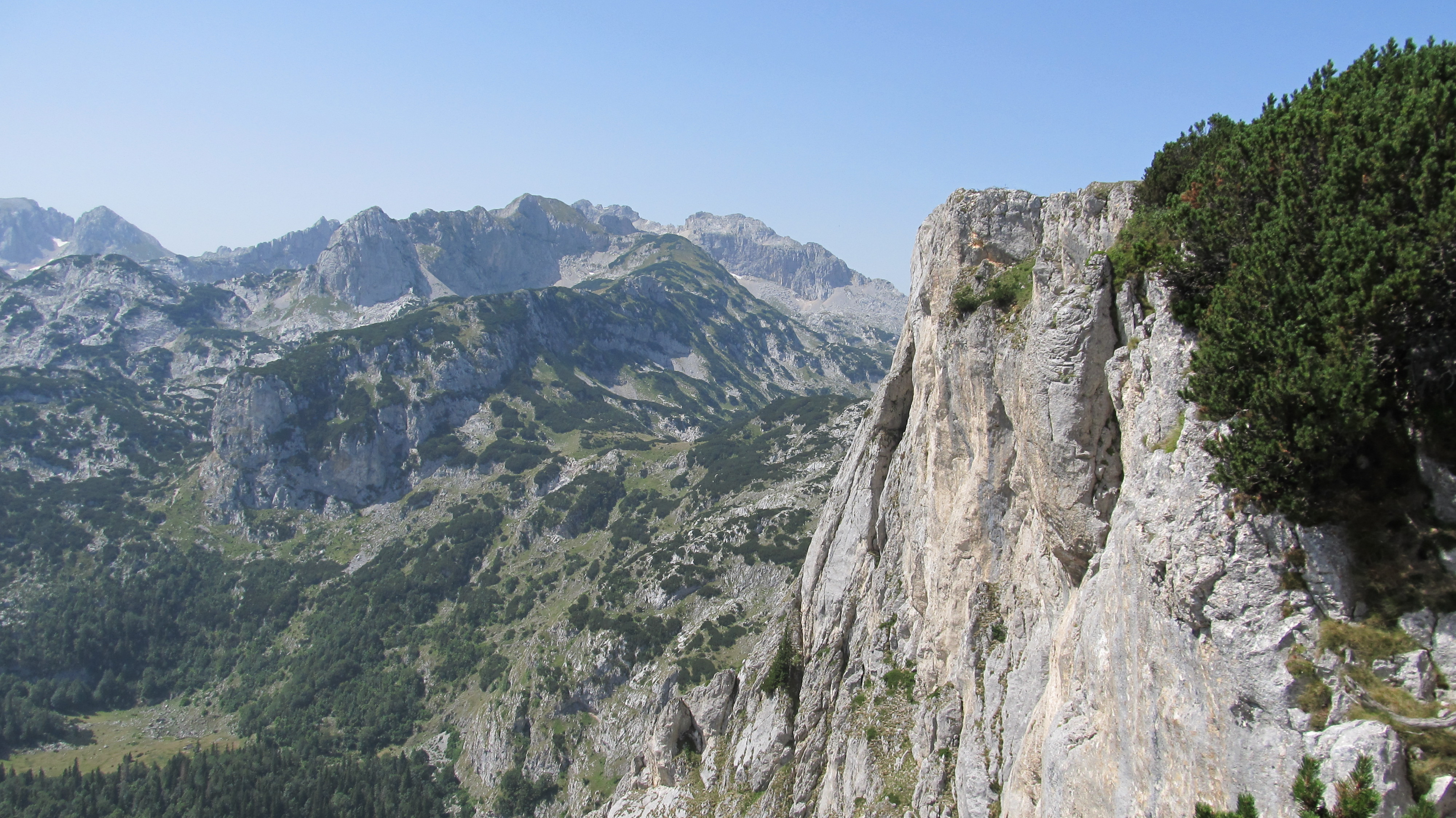
Crvena Greda Mountain

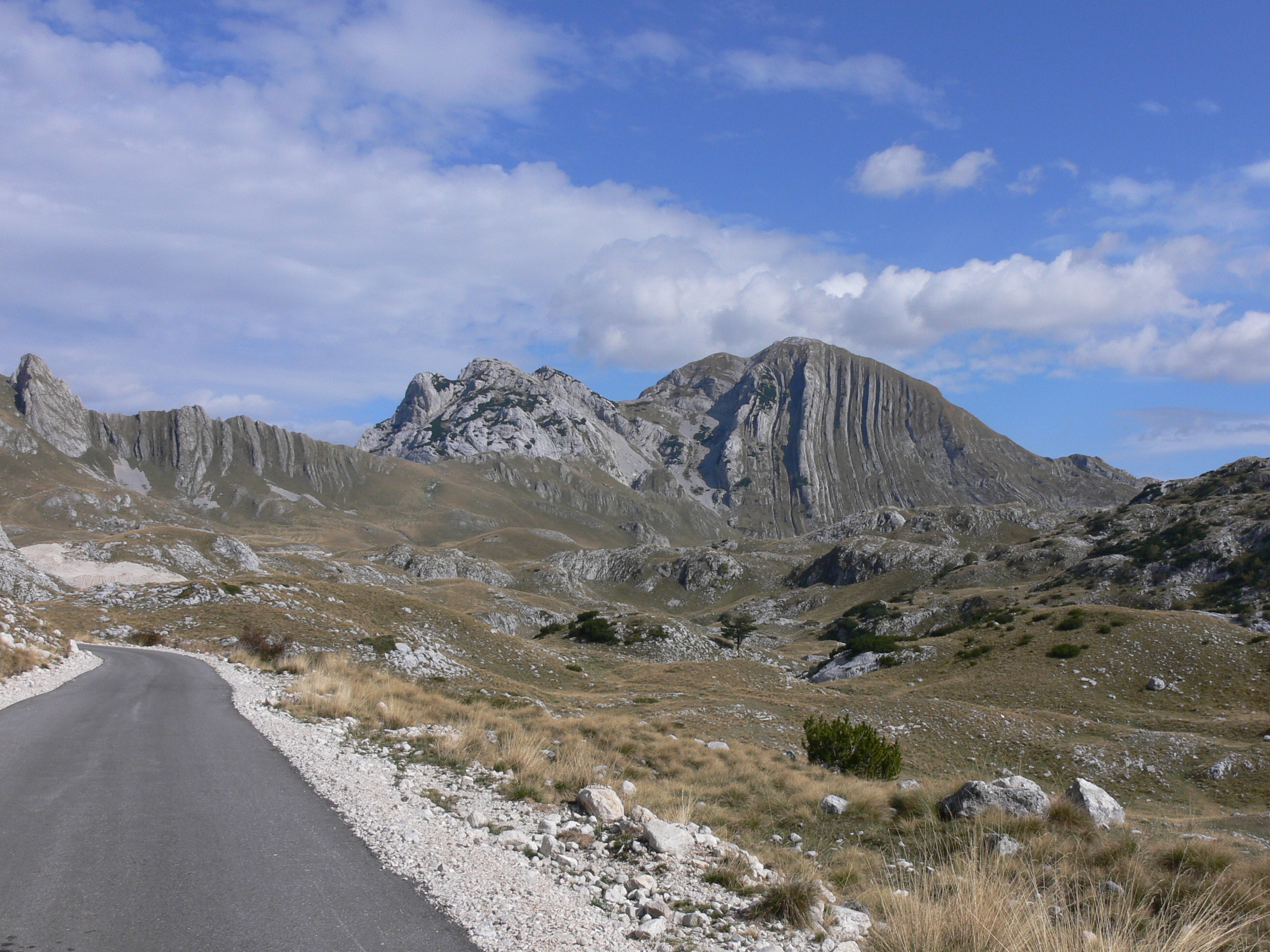
Prutaš

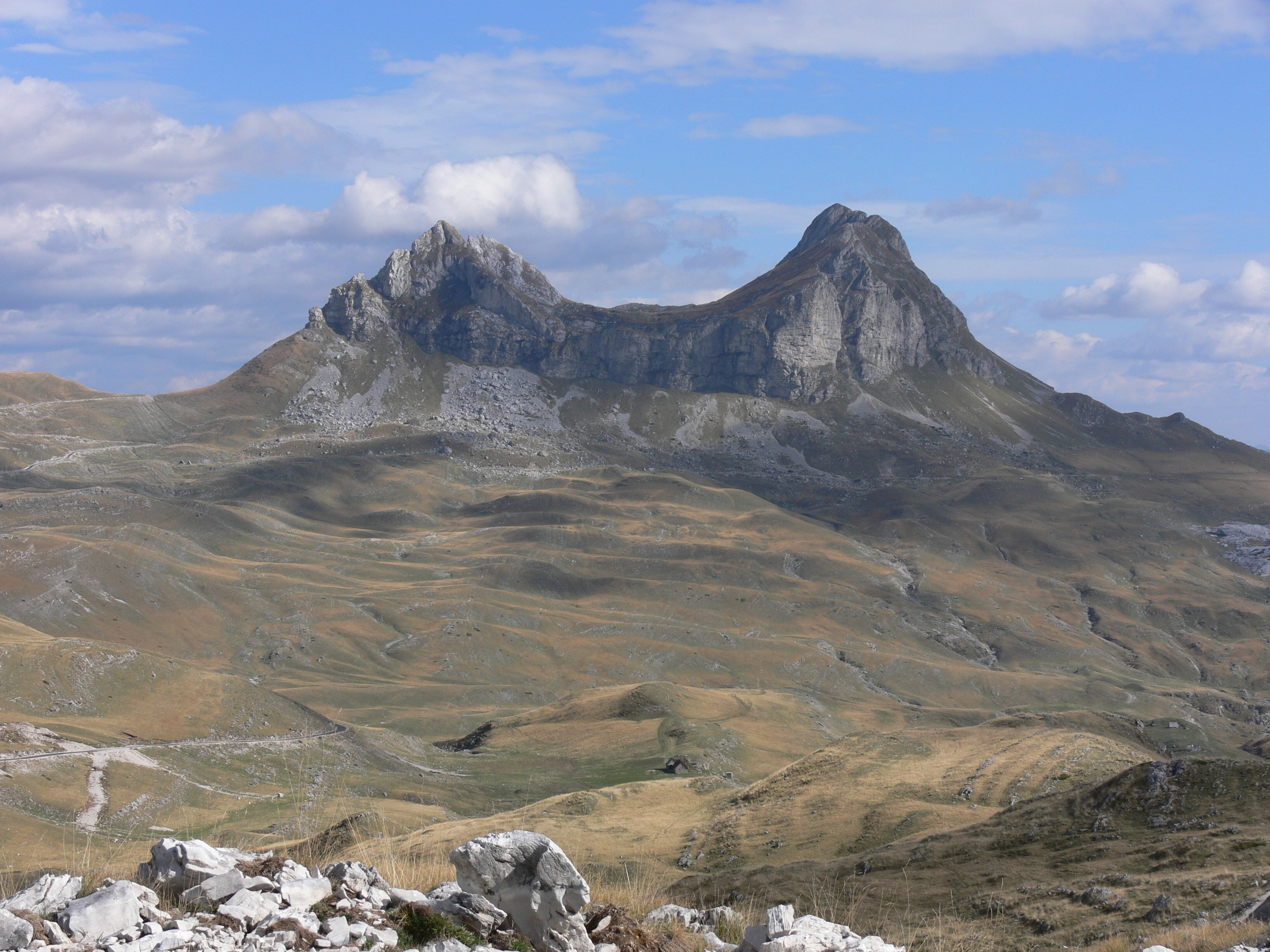
Sedlena Greda Mountain

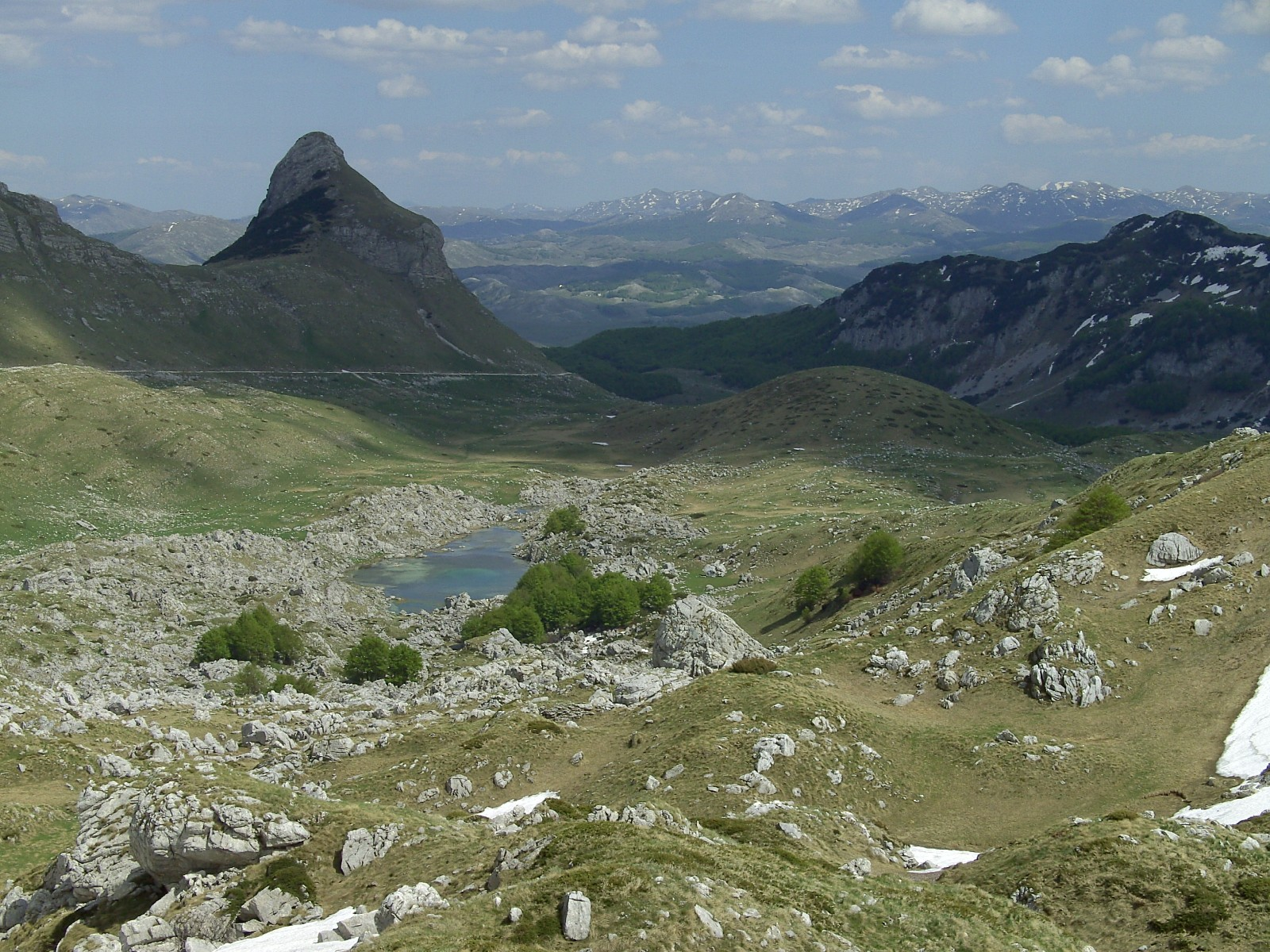
Poscenska dolina

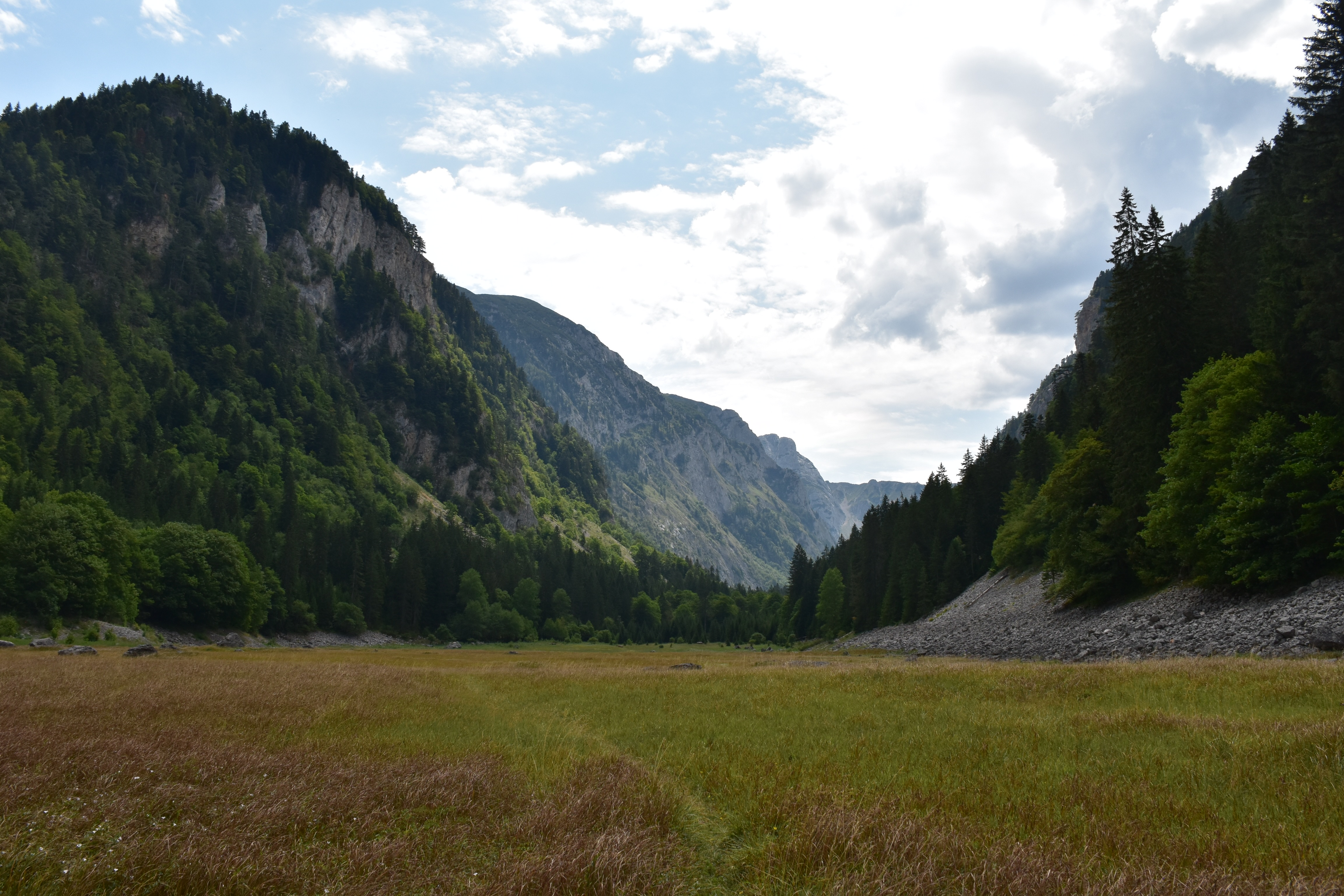
Sušica Canyon

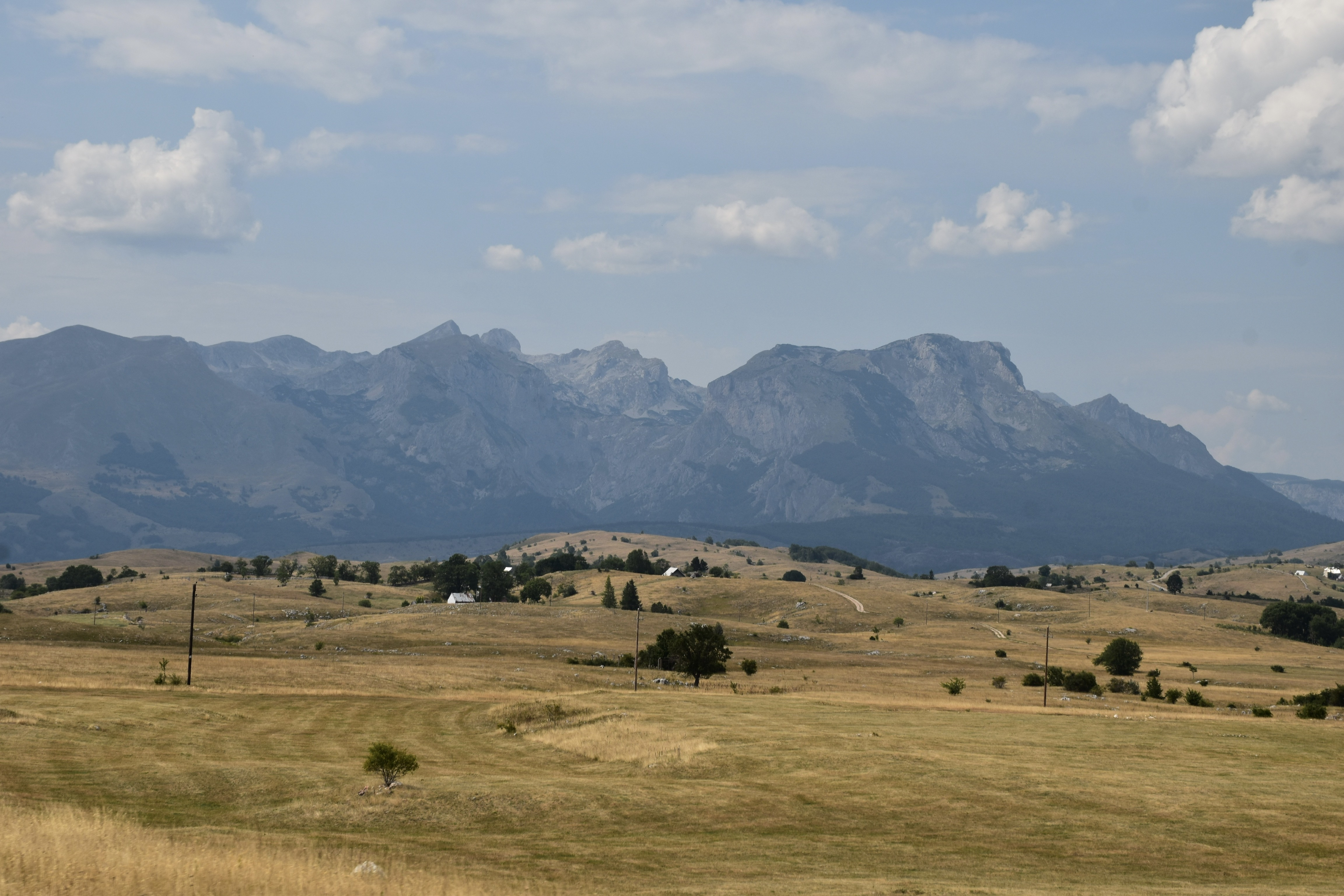

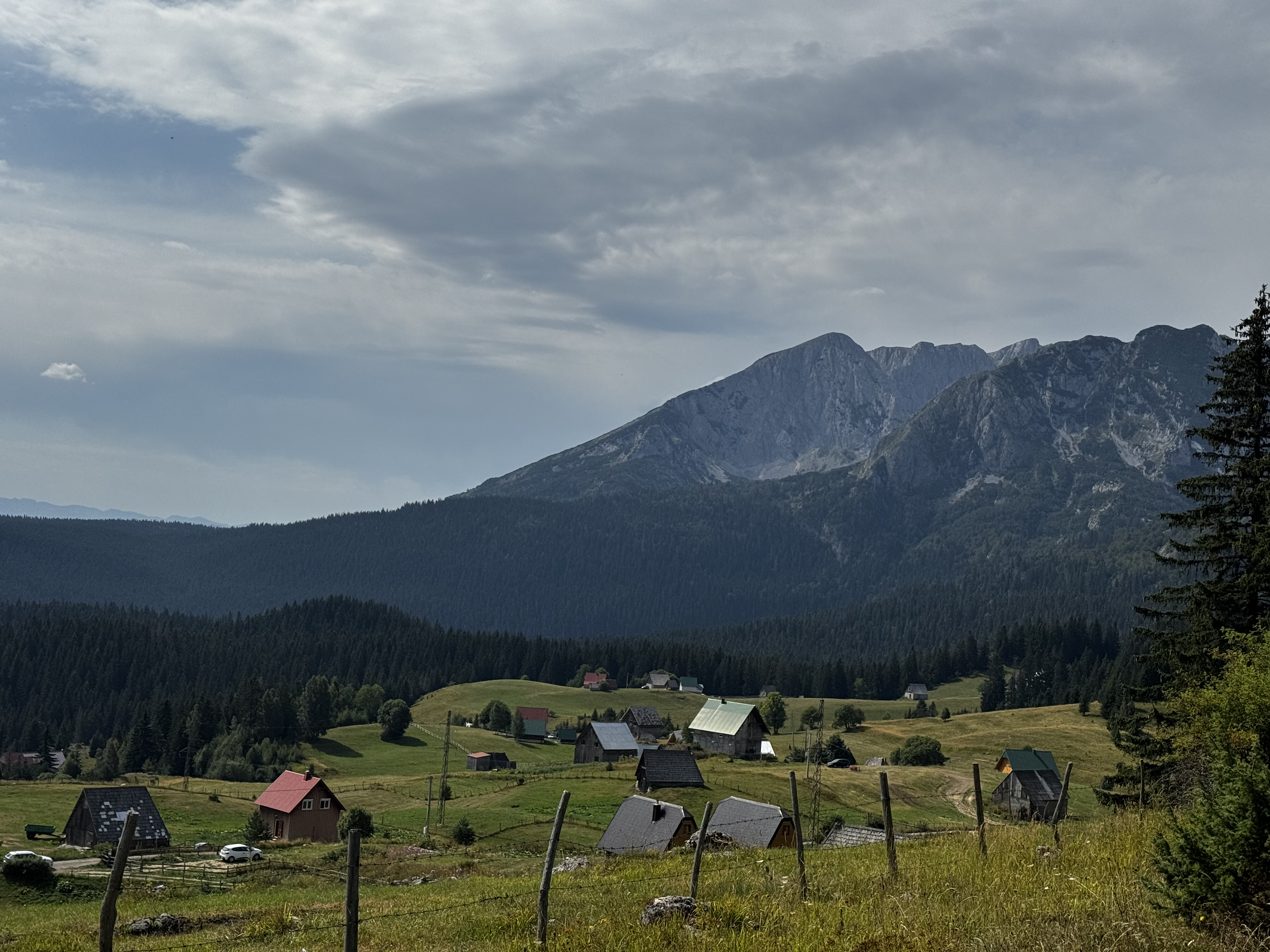

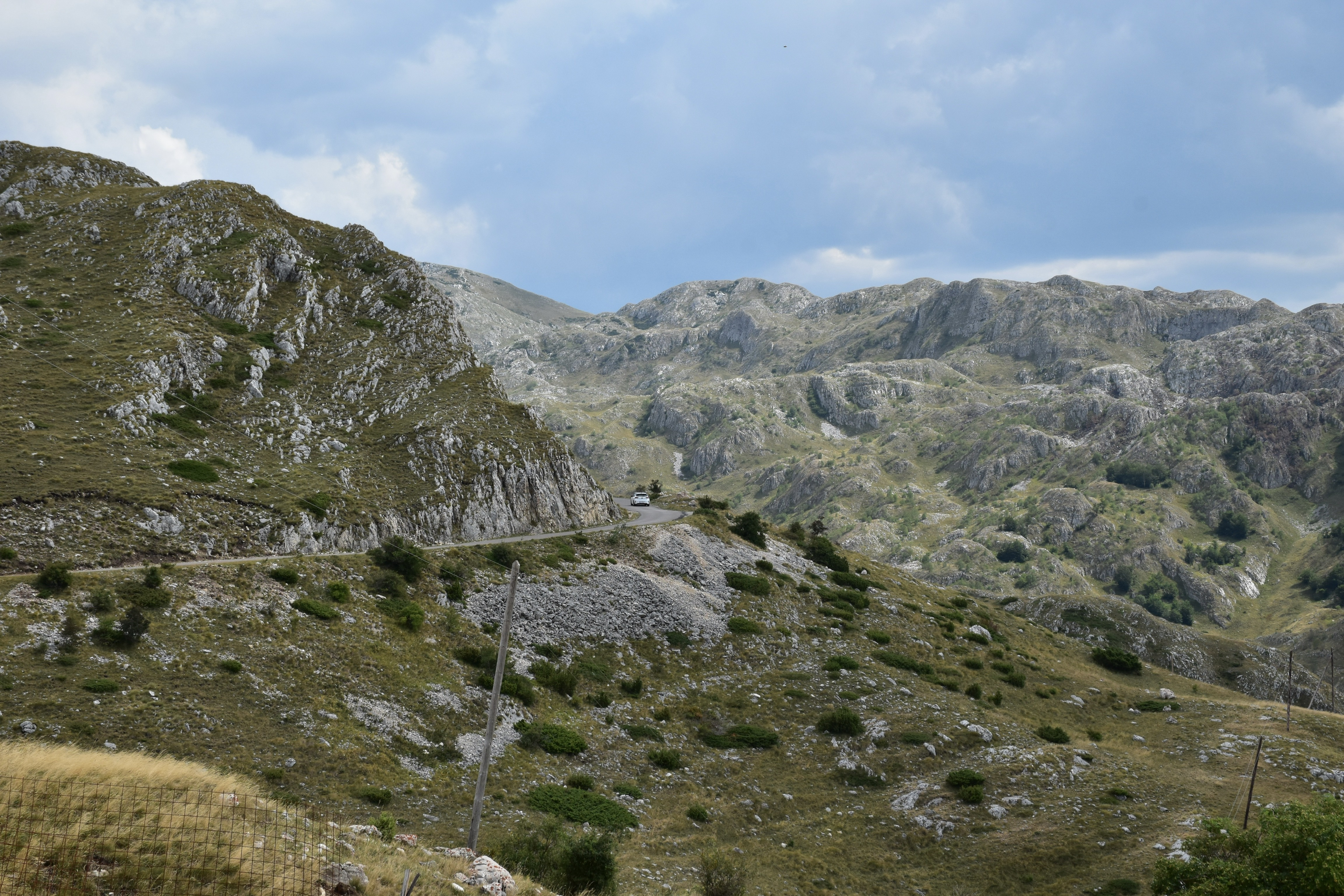
