= Savin Kuk =

Peak in Durmitor, Montenegro

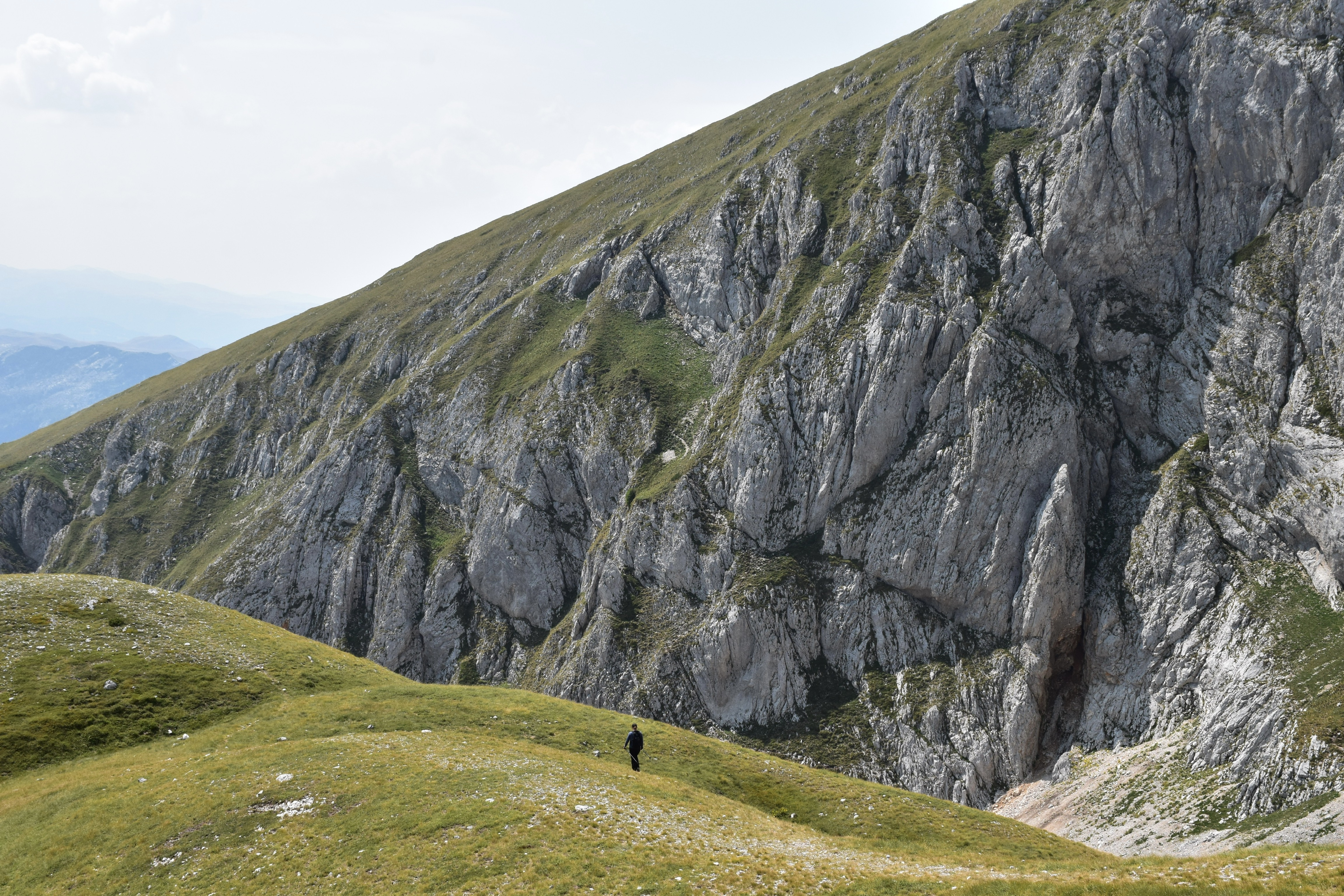
- View from the top

Highest point
- Elevation: 2,313 m (7,589 ft)
- Coordinates: 43°07′19.99″N 19°04′50.99″E

Geography
- Location: Žabljak Municipality, Montenegro
- Parent range: Durmitor (Dinaric Alps)

Savin Kuk is a peak located within Durmitor National Park in Montenegro. Its elevation is approximately 2,313 meters, making it the 14th highest peak of the Durmitor Massif. Its geological composition is primarily limestone.

The peak's name, Savin Kuk, derives from Saint Sava (Serbian: Sveti Sava), the founder of the Serbian Orthodox Church and a key figure in Serbian spiritual and national history. Born as Prince Rastko Nemanjić, the youngest son of Grand Prince Stefan Nemanja, he renounced his royal title in 1192 to become a monk on Mount Athos, where he took the monastic name Sava.

According to local tradition, Saint Sava frequently retreated to the Durmitor mountains for prayer and meditation, with Savin Kuk being his favored sanctuary. A popular legend recounts that while resting on the summit with a young disciple, Sava performed miracles to provide sustenance. When the disciple was hungry, Sava struck the ground with his staff, making the sign of the cross, and an onion grew from the earth. When the disciple was thirsty, Sava repeated the gesture, causing a fresh water spring to emerge from the ground.

This spring, known as Savina Voda ("Sava's Water," 2,212 m), is believed to possess holy and healing properties. Each year on Ilindan (St. Elijah's Day, August 2nd), pilgrims ascend to the spring either on foot or via the nearby chairlift from Žabljak to collect its water. The faithful believe the water grants health, spiritual peace, and protection from evil, and many attest that it remains fresh for an entire year when stored.

== Tourism ==
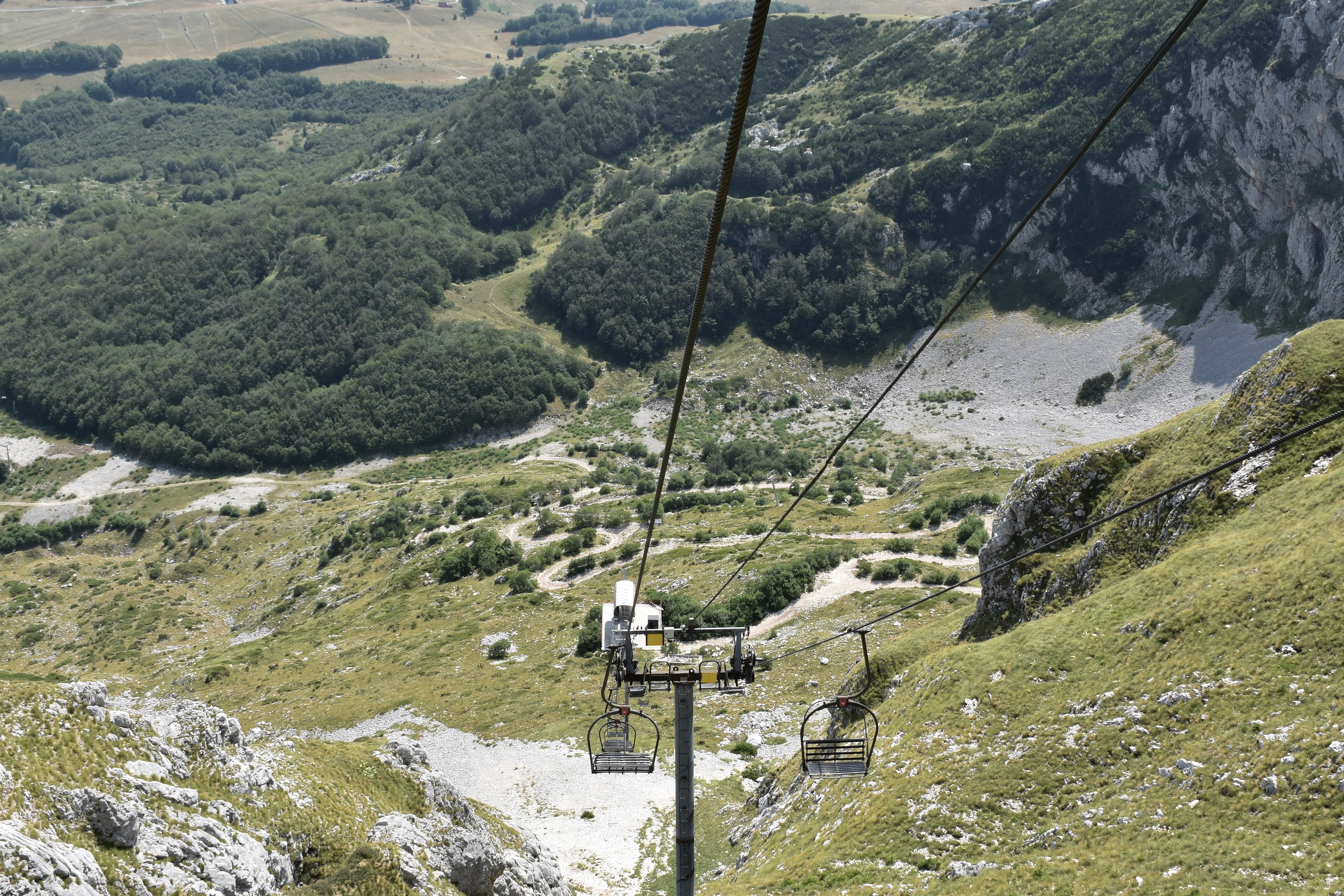
Savin Kuk Chairlift

The Ski Centar Savin Kuk located at the base in the village of Motički Gaj features a main chairlift reaching the summit, three surface lifts, and a network of groomed trails totaling approximately 3.5 kilometers with a vertical drop of about 750 meters. It offers skiing and snowboarding for all skill levels, equipment rental, a ski school, and on-mountain food services. The winter season typically runs from December to late March, while in summer, the chairlift operates for sightseers and hikers, providing access to high-altitude trails.

The main route to Savin Kuk starts at Black Lake in Zabljak and traces the ancient route that King Nikola I of Montenegro used in the early 1900s. The easiest route is to take the year-round cable car, though there are a few other options.

== Gallery ==
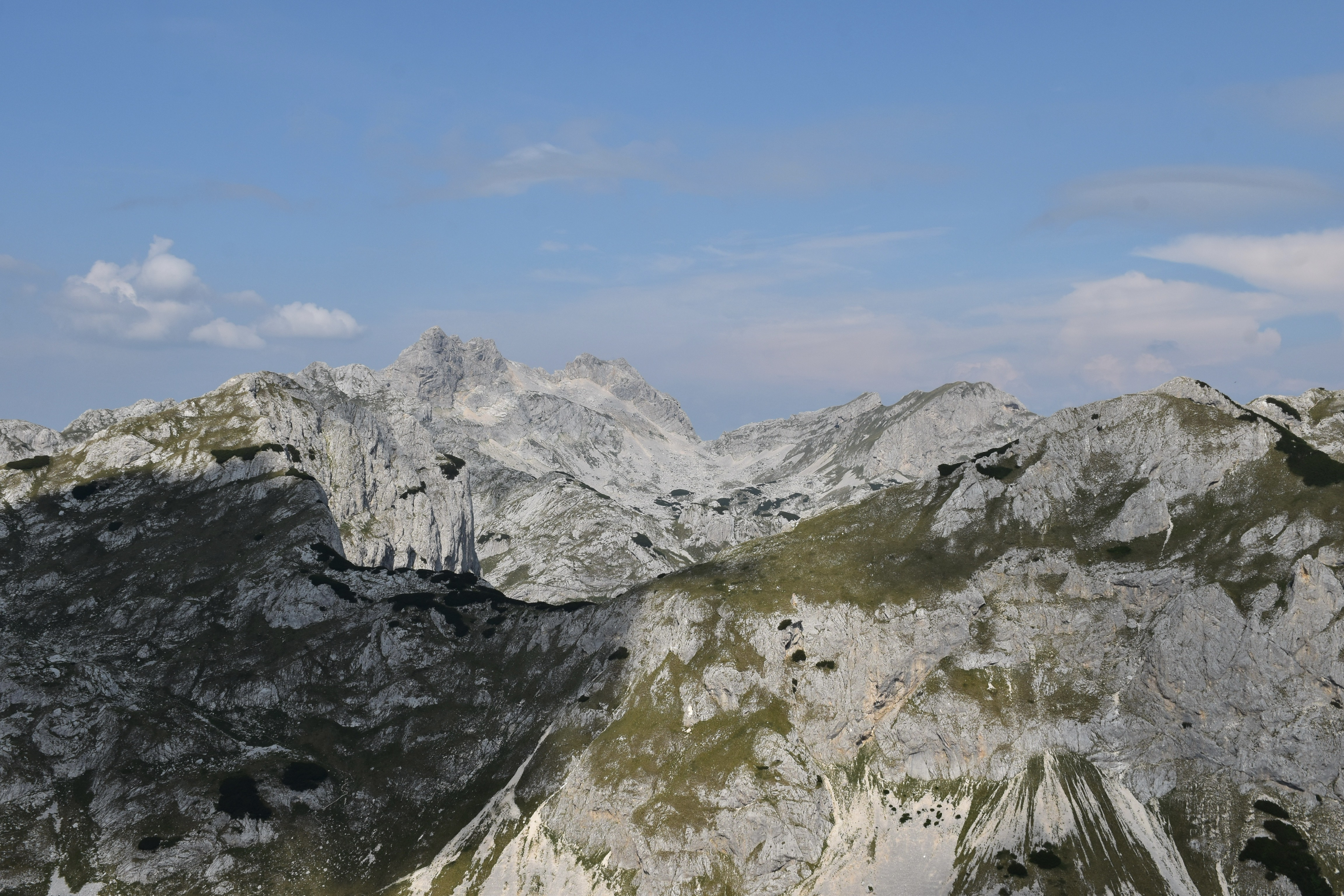
Bobotov Kuk View

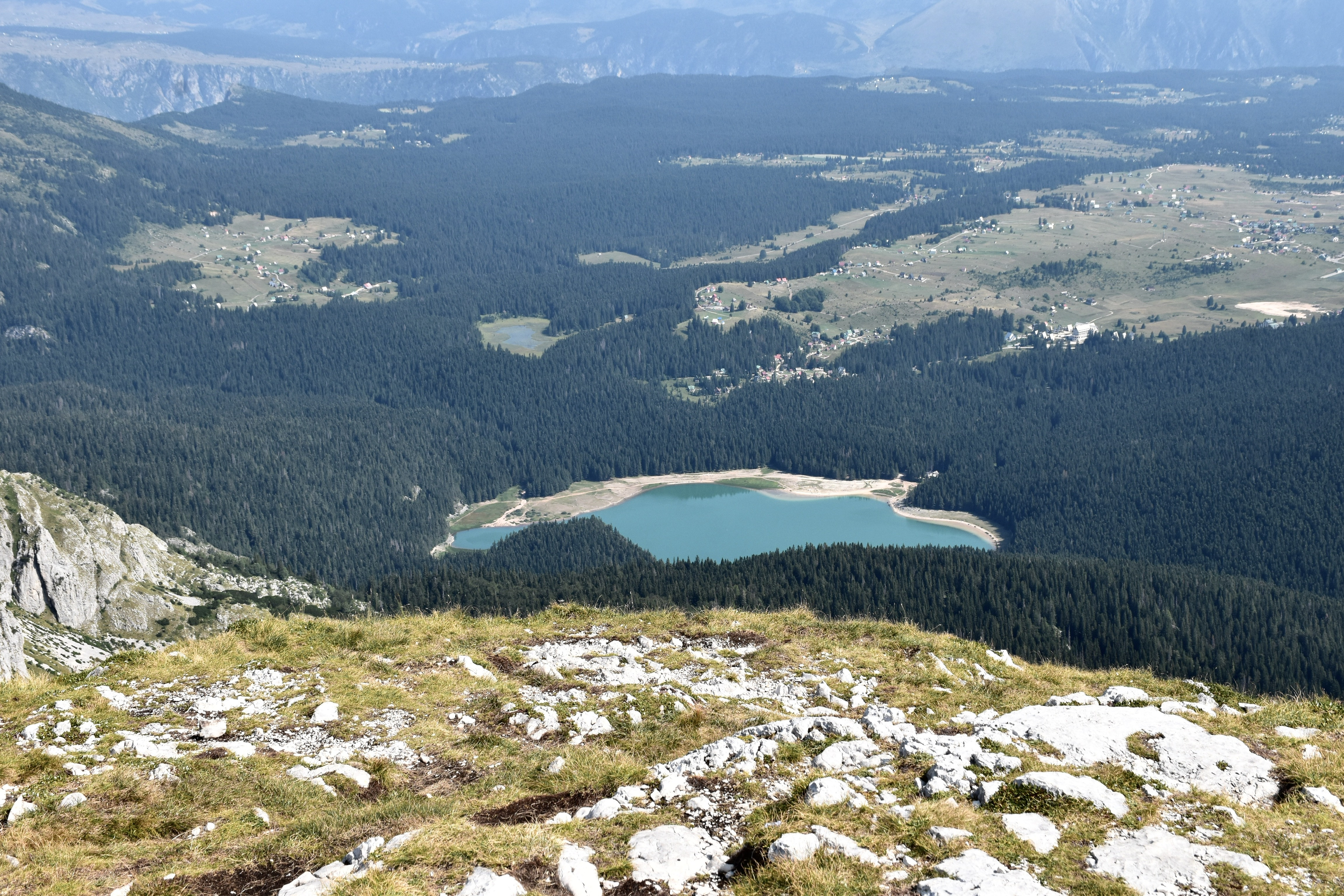
Crno Jezero View

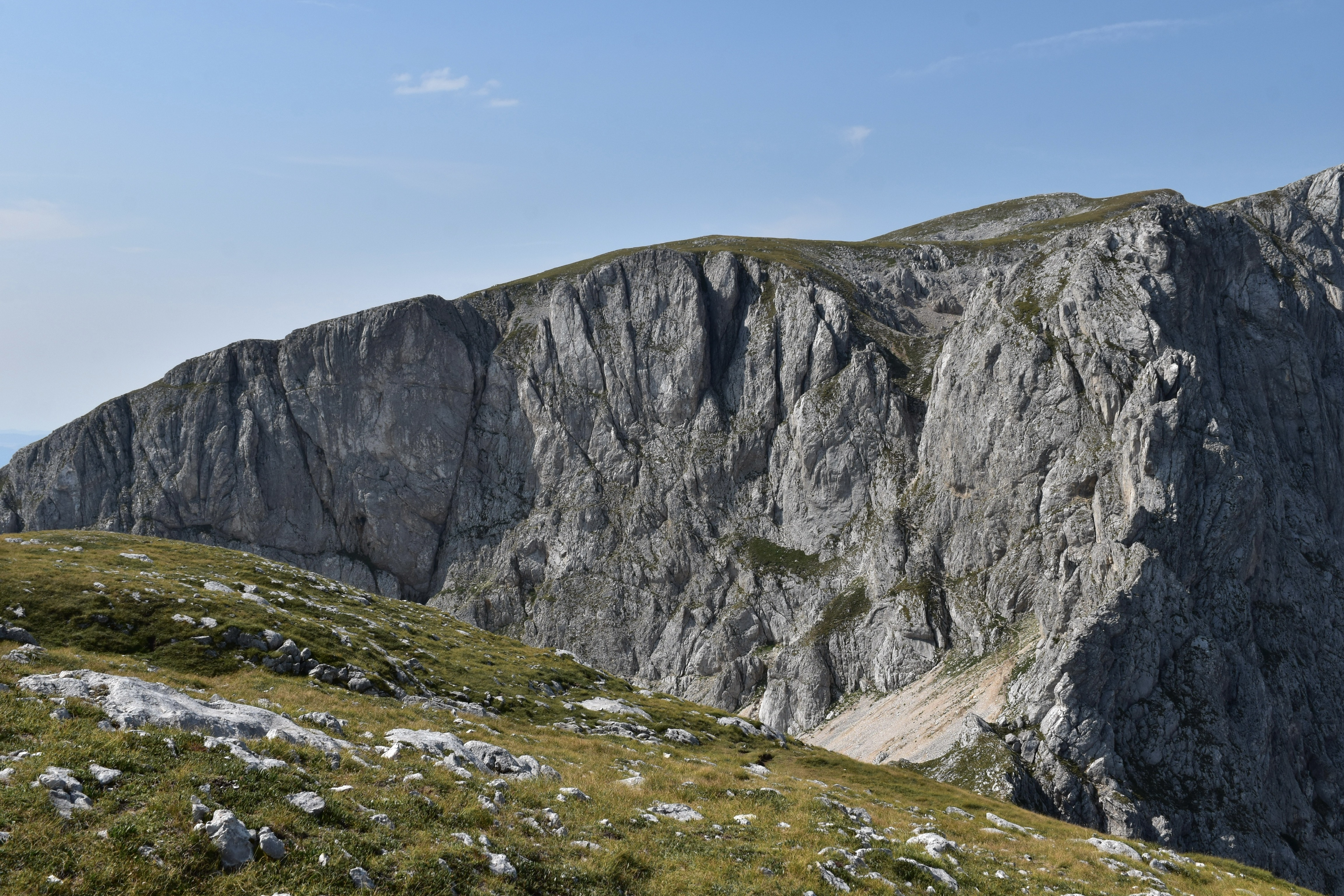
Savin Kuk Top View 1

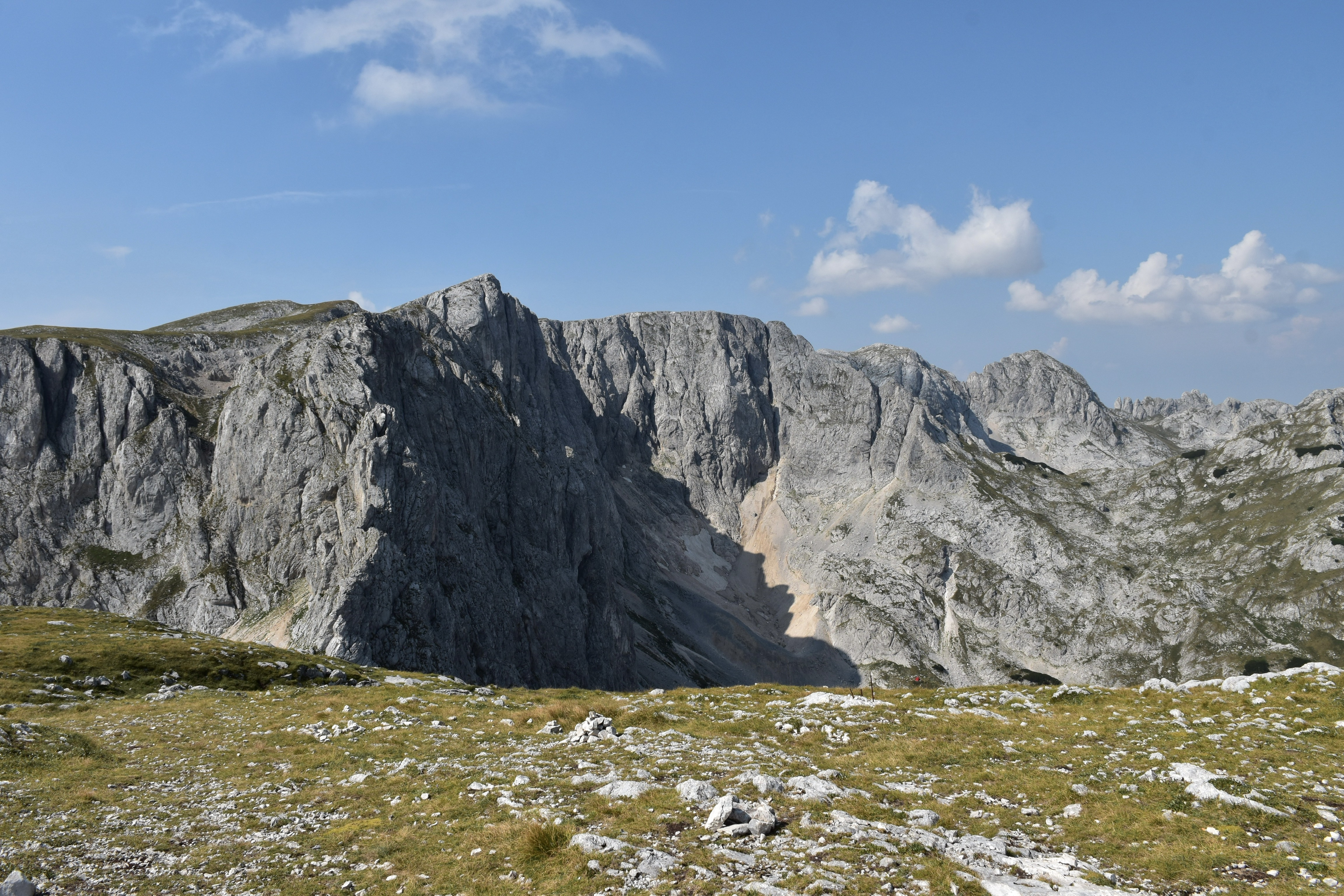
Savin Kuk Top View 2

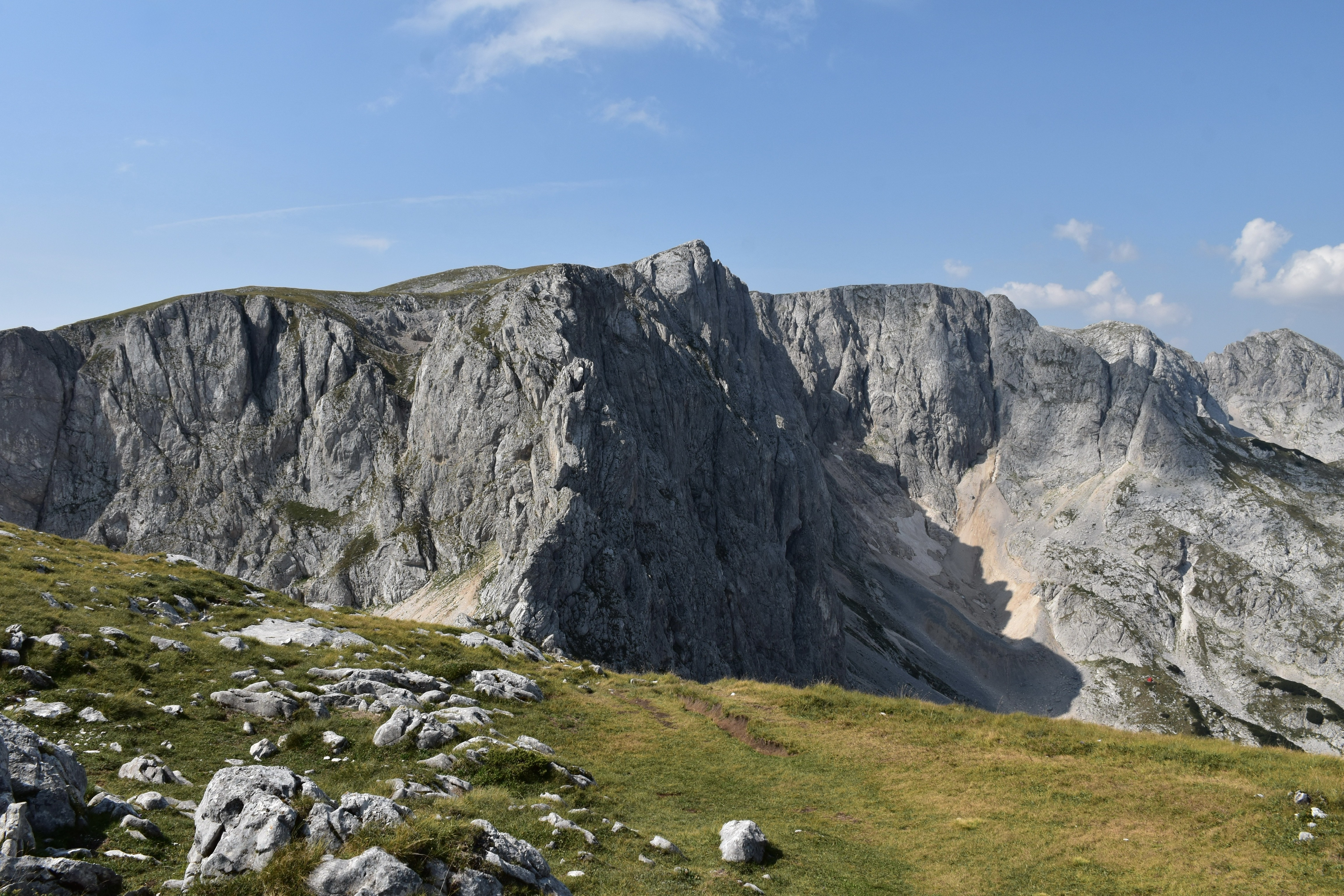
Savin Kuk Top View 3

== See also ==
- Durmitor
- Žabljak
- Bobotov Kuk
