= Via Dinarica =

Hiking trail in the western Balkans

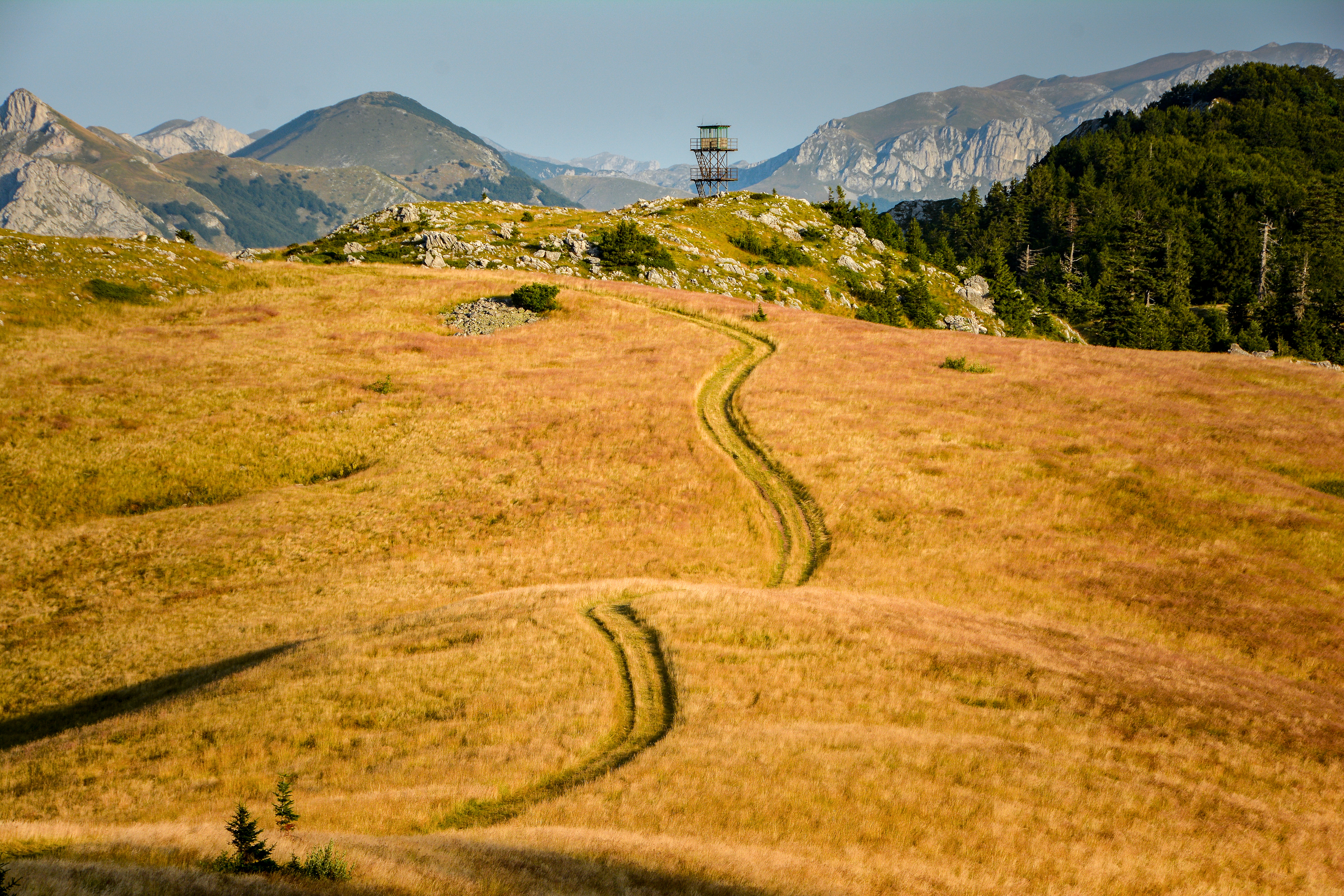
Landscape alongside the White Trail and Bosnia and Herzegovina's highest mountain Maglić.

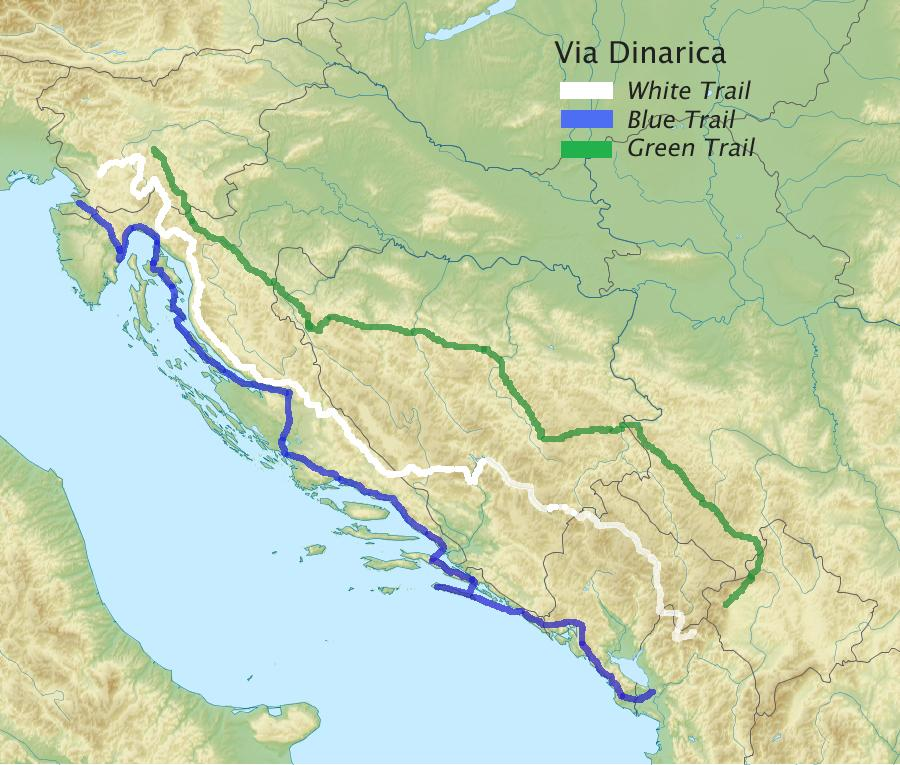
Trail map

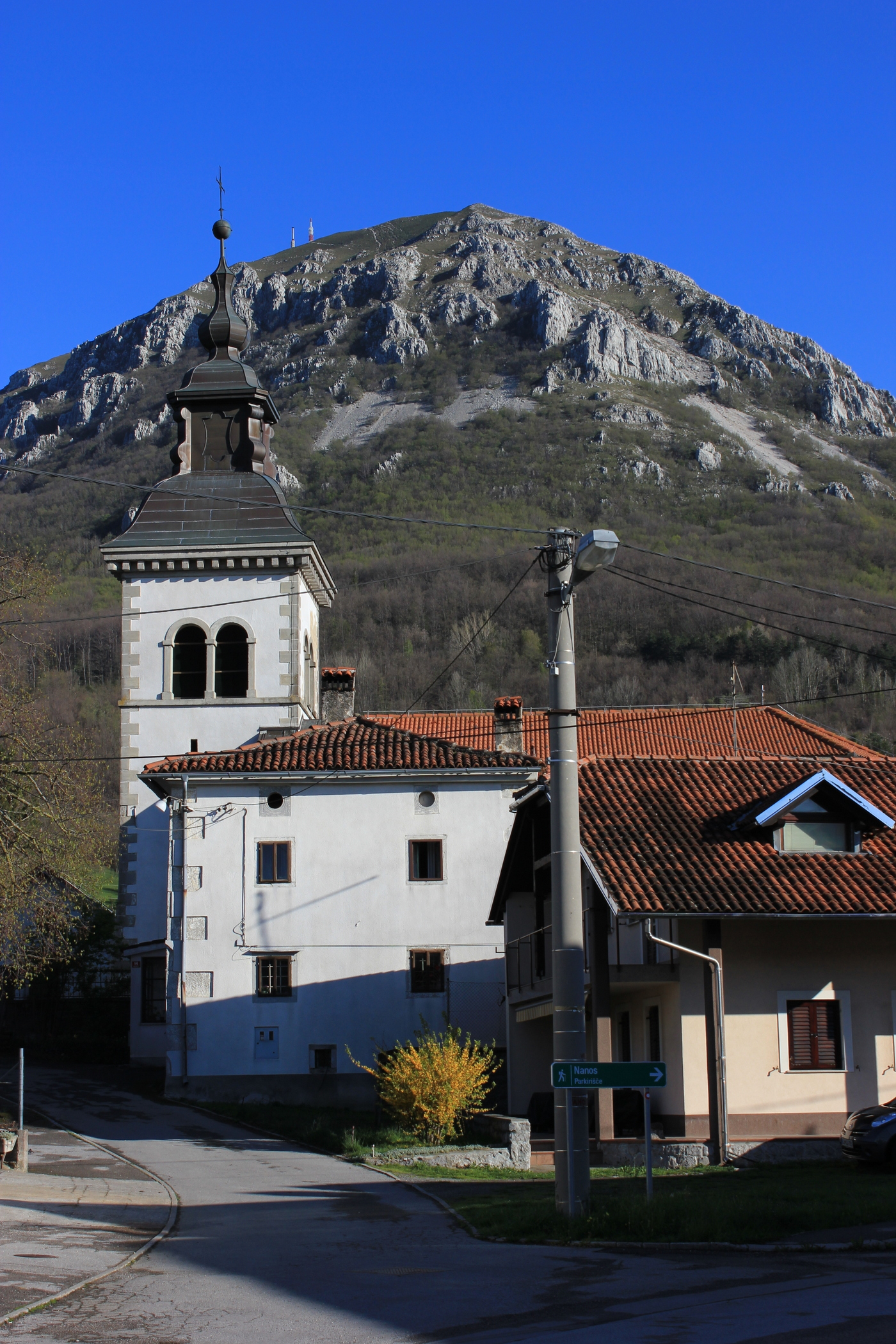
White Trail starts in Razdrto, Slovenia at the foot of the Nanos plateau (in the background).

The Via Dinarica is a network of long-distance hiking trails in the Dinaric Alps. It consists of the White Trail, Blue Trail and Green Trail. Via Dinarica connects the countries Slovenia, Croatia, Bosnia and Herzegovina, Montenegro, Serbia, Kosovo, and Albania.

The Via Dinarica project was launched in 2010 with the aim of promoting and developing tourism in the Western Balkans. The Green and Blue trails were under development as of 2020.

== White Trail ==
The White Trail (1,260.8 km) is the main route in Via Dinarica, and follows the main ridge of the Dinaric Alps. Along this route are the highest mountain peaks in each of the countries (except for Slovenia). The route starts in Razdrto at the foot of the Nanos plateau in Slovenia, and roughly follows the Croatian mountains of Velika Kapela, Velebit and Dinara. In Bosnia and Herzegovina, the trail passes through the Hercegovina region, and then through the mountains of Central Montenegro. The route ends in the Valbona valley in the Albanian Alps in Northern Albania.

== Blue Trail ==
The Blue Trail focuses on the coast of the Adriatic Sea, the islands, peninsulas and the somewhat lower mountains here.

== Green Trail ==
The Green Trail runs through the green and lush inland (for example the Lika region in Croatia and the central Bosnian regions) on the eastern slopes of the Dinaric Alps. The last part of the route also goes to western and south parts of Serbia, and ends in the western part of Kosovo.
