= Sušica Canyon =

Canyon in Durmitor, Montenegro

- Кањон Сушице/Kanjon Sušice (Serbo- Croatian)
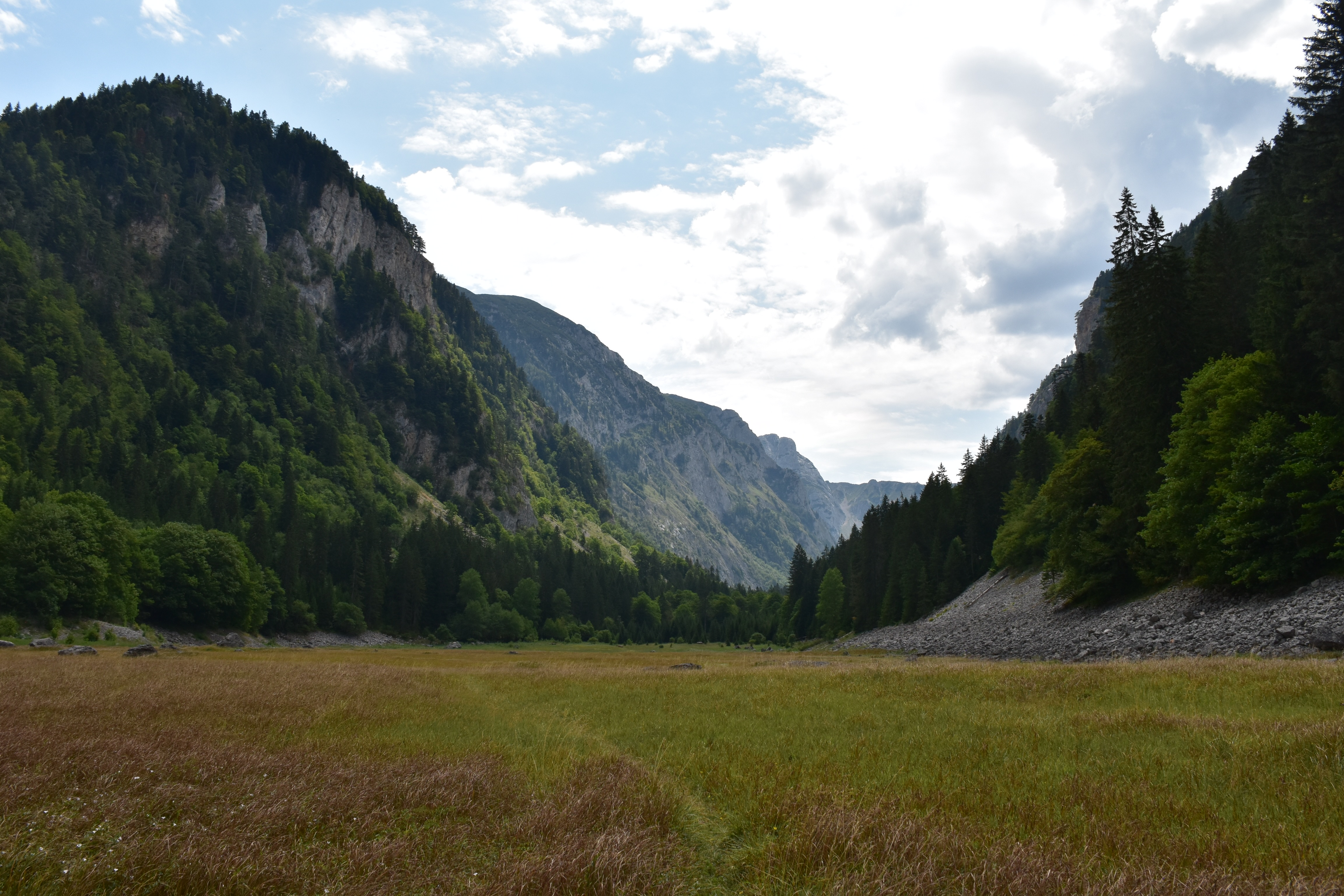
- View of Sušica Canyon (Sušičko Lake in August)
- Length: c. 14–15 km (8.7–9.3 mi) North-South
- Depth: up to 600 m (2,000 ft)

Geology
- Type: Glacial (U-shaped) valley / Canyon
- Age: Pleistocene

Geography
- Location: Žabljak Municipality, Montenegro
- Coordinates: 43.1852501°N 18.9995167°E
- Rivers: Sušica River

Location
- Interactive map of the canyon

Sušica Canyon (Serbo-Croatian: Кањон Сушице/Kanjon Sušice) is a canyon located on the western border of Durmitor National Park in northwestern Montenegro. It forms one of the five major canyons surrounding the Durmitor massif.

== Geography and geology ==
Sušica Canyon is a 14–15 km (8.7–9.3 mi) long canyon that delineates the natural western border of Durmitor National Park. The Sušica River, a tributary of the Tara River, originates at approximately 1,300 m (4,300 ft) above sea level and flows through the canyon before converging with the Tara at an altitude of about 512 m (1,680 ft). The canyon reaches depths of up to 600 m (2,000 ft).

It was carved by glacial erosion, the glacier that moved through the Sušica valley was approximately 10 km (6.2 mi) long and, during its most intensive phase, deposited moraine material at an altitude of 1,140 m (3,740 ft), creating the basin for Lake Sušica. The area features a mix of geological formations, including limestones, dolomites, and flysch.

== Tourism and access ==
The canyon is most easily accessed by car from the nearby town of Žabljak, following the scenic Durmitor Ring Road. The hike begins at the trailhead by the Sušica Hut, located near the Lake Sušica. The Sušica Canyon Trail itself is rated as easy to moderate, covering a round-trip distance of 13.2 km (8.2 mi) with an elevation gain of roughly 600 m (2,000 ft). The nearby villages of Mala Crna Gora and Nedajno are the closest settlements to the canyon.

== Biodiversity ==
The canyon's ecosystem hosts a variety of wildlife, including deer, bears, and rare birds. Its insect fauna is also notable; in 2010, a new species, Nonveiller’s Bright Bush-Cricket, was first described from the canyon.

== See also ==
- Durmitor National Park
- Tara River Canyon
- Žabljak
