= 2025–26 Montenegrin Third League =

Football league season

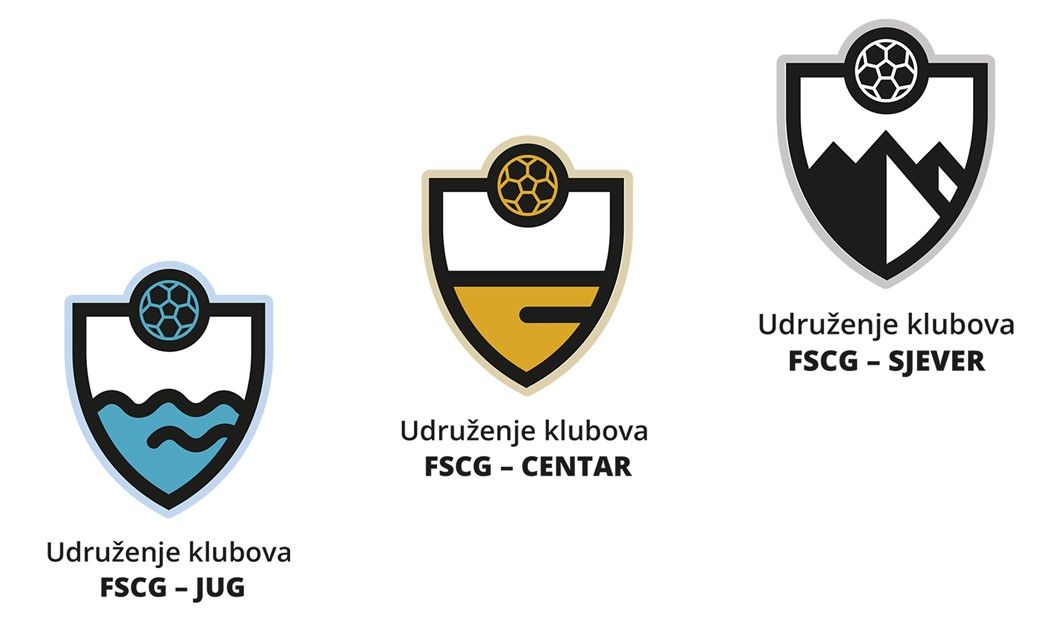
- Logos of the regional leagues (Sjever = North, Centar = Center, Jug = South)
- Season: 2025–26
- Dates: 30 August 2025 – (North) 6 September 2025 – (Center) 21 September 2025 – (South)
- Country: Montenegro
- Teams: 9 (North) 12 (Center) 7 (South)
- Biggest home win: Čelik 14-0 Zora (21 September 2025)
- Biggest away win: MKM 0–17 Zeta (25 October 2025)
- Highest scoring: MKM 0-17 Zeta (25 October 2025)
- All statistics correct as of 25 October 2025.

The 2025–26 Montenegrin Third League is the 20th season since the establishment of the Montenegrin Third League, the season began on 30 August 2025.

== Format of competition ==
For the 2025–26 season, the Third league is divided into three geographical regions. Nine teams participate in the North, twelve Center, and seven in the South. The new member of the Montenegrin Third League is Ibar who got relegated from the Montenegrin Second League the previous season and they will participate in the Northern League this season.

The teams who got promoted last season from the Montenegrin Third League to the Montenegrin Second League were Berane who were the champions of the North league in the 2024–25 season and Internacional who were the champions of the Central league.

Each team will play each other three times a season and depending on match schedule a team either plays one or two home games against a different team with the rest of the games being played away. At the end of the season the winners of each regional league will compete in a play-off against each other where each team will play each other once in a round-robin format. The winner will advance directly to the Second League, while the second and third-placed teams will play an additional play-off with the eighth and ninth-placed teams from the Second League.

== Teams ==
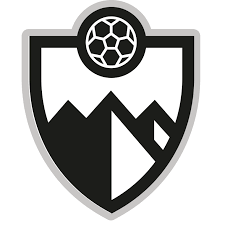
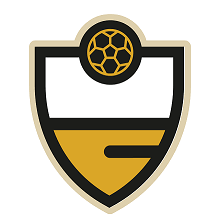
Montenegrin Third League logos

=== North ===
The following nine teams will participate in this season of the third league northern part:

Third league - North 2025–26

Team	Location	Stadium	Capacity
Borac	Bijelo Polje	Gradski	4,000
Brskovo	Mojkovac	Gradski	2,000
Gusinje	Gusinje	Gradski	1,500
Ibar	Rožaje	Bandžovo brdo	3,000
Komovi	Andrijevica	Prljanije	300
OFK Gusinje	Gusinje	Gradski	1,500
Petnjica	Petnjica	Gusare	1,000
Pljevlja	Pljevlja	Pod Golubinjom	5,140
Polimlje	Murino	Gradski	300

=== Center ===
The following twelve teams will participate in this season of the third league central part:

Team	Location	Stadium	Capacity
Balkan Eagles	Tuzi	Stadion Tuško Polje	2,000
Čelik	Nikšić	Stadion Željezare	2,000
Drezga	Piperi	Stadion Drezge	100
Karioke	Podgorica	Kamp FSCG	1,050
Ilarion	Golubovci	Ilarion Field	1,000
MKM	Podgorica	Ilarion Field	1,000
OFK Titograd	Ljajkovići	Kamp FSCG	1,050
Onogošt	Nikšić	Auxiliary Stadium of FK Sutjeska Nikšić	
Stari Aerodrom	Podgorica	FK Budućnost Training camp	
Zabjelo	Podgorica	Stadion FK Zabjelo	750
Zeta	Golubovci	Trešnjica	4,000
Zora	Spuž	Spuž City Stadium	1,700

=== South ===
The following seven teams will participate in this season of the third league southern part:

Third league - South 2025–26

Team	Location	Stadium	Capacity
Adrenalin	Kotor	Auxiliary Stadium of FK Bokelj	
Budva	Budva	Lugovi	1,500
Cetinje	Cetinje	Obilića poljana	2,000
Balkan	Bar	SRC Topolica	2,500
Orjen	Zelenika	Opačica	650
Sloga Bar	Bar	Topolica	2,500
Sloga Radovići	Radovići	Radovići	300

== League tables ==
=== North ===
Pos	Team	Pld	W	D	L	GF	GA	GD	Pts	
1	Brskovo	13	11	2	0	48	12	+36	35	Qualification for the 2. CFL play-offs
2	Ibar	12	8	3	1	36	8	+28	27	
3	Polimlje	12	8	0	4	29	17	+12	24	
4	Petnjica (Note: Petnjica were deducted 1 point after hostile behavior in the game against FK Ibar, Ibar were awarded a 3-0 victory.)	13	7	2	4	28	15	+13	22	
5	Komovi	13	6	2	5	31	19	+12	20	
6	Borac	12	6	0	6	37	20	+17	18	
7	OFK Gusinje	13	3	1	9	26	42	−16	10	
8	Pljevlja (Note: Pljevlja were deducted 3 points after not playing their game against Polimlje, Polimlje were awarded a 3–0 victory)	12	2	0	10	16	56	−40	3	
9	Gusinje (Note: Gusinje were deducted 3 points after not playing their game against Pljevlja, Pljevlja were awarded a 3–0 victory)	12	0	0	12	5	67	−62	−3	

Updated to match(es) played on 13 November 2025. Source: Football Association of Montenegro (in Montenegrin)
Rules for classification: 1) Points; 2) Head-to-head points; 3) Head-to-head goal difference; 4) Head-to-head goals scored; 5) Goal difference; 6) Goals scored; 7) Draw.

=== Center ===
Pos	Team	Pld	W	D	L	GF	GA	GD	Pts	
1	Balkan Eagles	11	10	1	0	50	8	+42	31	Qualification for the 2. CFL play-offs
2	Zabjelo	11	9	0	2	69	7	+62	27	
3	Zeta	11	8	1	2	61	9	+52	25	
4	Čelik	11	8	1	2	47	13	+34	25	
5	Ilarion	11	7	1	3	28	15	+13	22	
6	Stari Aerodrom	11	5	1	5	28	22	+6	16	
7	Drezga	11	5	1	5	41	36	+5	16	
8	Onogošt	11	4	0	7	14	27	−13	12	
9	Titograd	11	4	0	7	18	41	−23	12	
10	Zora	11	1	1	9	15	88	−73	4	
11	MKM	11	0	2	9	8	65	−57	2	
12	Karioke	11	0	1	10	7	55	−48	1	

Updated to match(es) played on 16 November 2025. Source: Football Association of Montenegro (in Montenegrin)
Rules for classification: 1) Points; 2) Head-to-head points; 3) Head-to-head goal difference; 4) Head-to-head goals scored; 5) Goal difference; 6) Goals scored; 7) Draw.

=== South ===
Pos	Team	Pld	W	D	L	GF	GA	GD	Pts	
1	Budva	9	8	1	0	38	7	+31	25	Qualification for the 2. CFL play-offs
2	Balkan	8	6	0	2	42	10	+32	18	
3	Sloga Stari Bar	8	6	0	2	33	7	+26	18	
4	Orjen	9	5	1	3	25	19	+6	16	
5	Sloga Radovići	9	3	0	6	13	18	−5	9	
6	Adrenalin (Note: Adrenalin were deducted 1 point for fielding an ineligible player in the match against Sloga Radovići, Sloga Radovići were awarded a 3-0 win. The match originally ended 0-0.)	9	1	0	8	6	56	−50	2	
7	Cetinje	8	0	0	8	3	43	−40	0	

Updated to match(es) played on 16 November 2025. Source: Football Association of Montenegro (in Montenegrin)
Rules for classification: 1) Points; 2) Head-to-head points; 3) Head-to-head goal difference; 4) Head-to-head goals scored; 5) Goal difference; 6) Goals scored; 7) Draw.

== Results ==
=== North ===
==== First and second round ====
Home \ Away	BOR	BRS	GUS	IBA	KOM	OFK	PET	POL	PLJ
Borac	—	2–4	8–0	0–2		6–2	0–1	1–2	
Brskovo	3–2	—		3–3	3–1	3–0	4–0	4–1	9–1
Gusinje	0–5	0–8	—	0–6	0–5		0–4	2–6	
Ibar		0–1		—	2–1	5–0	3–0 (Note: Ibar were awarded a 3-0 victory, the match originally ended 1-2 (in favour of FK Petnjica).)	3–1	5–0
Komovi	2–0	0–2	5–1	1–1	—	4–0			2–0
OFK Gusinje	3–4		5–2	0–0	2–5	—	2–1	1–3	10–2
Petnjica		1–1	7–0		1–1	0–0	—	3–0	3–1
Polimlje	0–1		5–0		3–1	4–1	1–0	—	3–0 (Note: Polimlje were awarded the 3-0 win after Pljevlja forfeited the match.)
Pljevlja	1–8	1–3	3–0 (Note: Pljevlja were awarded a 3-0 win after FK Gusinje forfeited the match.)		4–3		2–4		—

Updated to match(es) played on 13 November 2025. Source: Football Association of Montenegro (in Montenegrin)
Legend: Blue = home team win; Yellow = draw; Red = away team win.
For upcoming matches, an "a" indicates there is an article about the rivalry between the two participants.

=== Center ===
==== First and second round ====
Home \ Away	FKB	ČEL	DRE	KAR	ILA	MKM	TTG	ONO	STA	ZAB	ZET	ZOR
Balkan Eagles	—		5–0	7–1			3–2	2–1				13–0
Čelik	3–3	—	3–2	4–0			6–0		2–1			14–0
Drezga			—	8–1					4–4	1–9	0–5	12–1
Karioke		1–3		—	1–4	2–2		1–2	1–5			0–3
Ilarion		1–3	3–0		—	3–0				2–1	2–2	
MKM	0–8	0–7	2–6			—	0–3			0–10	0–17	
Titograd			1–2	2–0	2–1		—	0–2	2–3			6–4
Onogošt		0–4	2–6		0–2	2–1		—		0–8	0–2	
Stari Aerodrom					1–3	5–1		1–0	—	1–3	1–2	
Zabjelo	0–2	4–0		11–0			8–0			—	2–1	
Zeta	0–1	2–1		7–0			12–0				—	11–2
Zora					0–6	2–2		0–5	3–6	0–13		—

Updated to match(es) played on 16 November 2025. Source: Football Association of Montenegro (in Montenegrin)
Legend: Blue = home team win; Yellow = draw; Red = away team win.
For upcoming matches, an "a" indicates there is an article about the rivalry between the two participants.

=== South ===
==== First and second round ====
Home \ Away	ADR	BAL	BUD	CET	ORJ	SRD	SSB
Adrenalin	—	0–12	1–11			1–4	1–5
Balkan		—	0–4	14–2	6–0		2–1
Budva	4–1	3–0	—	3–0 (Note: Budva were awarded a 3-0 win after Cetinje did not arrive to the match at the scheduled time.)	3–3		3–1
Cetinje	0–2	0–4		—	0–9	0–3	
Orjen	3–0 (Note: Orjen were awarded a 3-0 win after Adrenalin did not arrive to the match at the scheduled time.)		1–3	5–1	—	1–0	
Sloga Radovići	3–0 (Note: Sloga Radovići were awarded a 3-0 win after Adrenalin fielded an ineligible player, the match originally ended 0-0.)	0–4	0–4		2–3	—	1–2
Sloga Stari Bar	14–0			3–0	4–0	3–0	—

Updated to match(es) played on 23 November 2025. Source: Football Association of Montenegro (in Montenegrin)
Legend: Blue = home team win; Yellow = draw; Red = away team win.
For upcoming matches, an "a" indicates there is an article about the rivalry between the two participants.

== See also ==
- Montenegrin Third League
- Montenegrin Second League
- Montenegrin First League
- 2025–26 Montenegrin Second League
