= List of football clubs in Montenegro =

Football clubs in Montenegro are organized under the Football Association of Montenegro (FSCG), which governs three national league tiers: the Montenegrin First League, the Montenegrin Second League, and the Montenegrin Third League. Below the FSCG, three territorial sub-associations cover the Central, South, and North regions of the country, and every club is a member of both the FSCG and its respective regional sub-association.

== Active clubs ==
During the season 2018–19, overall 44 Montenegrin football clubs play in Montenegrin First League, Montenegrin Second League and Montenegrin Third League.
First and Second League have 10 members, while in three groups of Third League are playing 29 teams.

=== Clubs by region ===
Below the Football Association of Montenegro (FSCG), there are three territorial sub-associations, founded by FSCG—its Football Associations of Central, South, and North regions. Every single club is a member of FSCG and their territorial sub-association.

==== Central region ====
| Club | Town | League | Founded |
|---|---|---|---|
| FK Adria | Podgorica | 3rd | 2016 |
| Bratstvo | Zeta | 3rd | 1975 |
| FK Budućnost | Podgorica | 1st | 1925 |
| FK Crvena Stijena | Podgorica | 3rd | 1938 |
| FK Čelik | Nikšić | 3rd | 1957 |
| FK Dečić | Tuzi | 2nd | 1926 |
| FK Drezga | Piperi | 3rd | 1972 |
| FK Gorštak | Kolašin | 3rd | 1927 |
| FK Iskra | Danilovgrad | 1st | 1919 |
| FK Karioke | Podgorica | 3rd | 2003 |
| FK Kom | Podgorica | 2nd | 1935 |
| OFK Mladost 1970 | Podgorica | 2nd | 1970 |
| FK Polet | Nikšić | 3rd | 2000 |
| FK Ribnica | Podgorica | 3rd | 1974 |
| FK Sutjeska | Nikšić | 1st | 1927 |
| OFK Titograd | Podgorica | 1st | 1951 |
| FK Zabjelo | Podgorica | 3rd | 1962 |
| FK Zeta | Golubovci | 1st | 1927 |

==== South region ====
| Club | Town | League | Founded |
|---|---|---|---|
| FK Arsenal | Tivat | 2nd | 1914 |
| FK Bokelj | Kotor | 2nd | 1922 |
| FK Cetinje | Cetinje | 3rd | 1975 |
| OFK Grbalj | Radanovići | 1st | 1995 |
| FK Hajduk | Bar | 3rd | 2009 |
| FK Igalo | Igalo | 2nd | 1929 |
| FK Lovćen | Cetinje | 1st | 1913 |
| FK Mornar | Bar | 1st | 1923 |
| FK Otrant | Ulcinj | 2nd | 1921 |
| OFK Petrovac | Petrovac | 1st | 1969 |
| FK Sloga | Stari Bar | 3rd | 1926 |
| FK Sloga | Radovići | 3rd | 1968 |

==== North region ====
| Club | Town | League | Founded |
|---|---|---|---|
| OFK Borac | Bijelo Polje | 3rd | 2015 |
| FK Berane | Berane | 2nd | 1920 |
| FK Brskovo | Mojkovac | 3rd | 1932 |
| FK Fair Play | Bijelo Polje | 3rd | 2010 |
| FK Gusinje | Gusinje | 3rd | 1933 |
| FK Ibar | Rožaje | 3rd | 1938 |
| FK Jedinstvo | Bijelo Polje | 2nd | 1922 |
| FK Jezero | Plav | 1st | 1948 |
| FK Polimlje | Murino | 3rd | 1934 |
| FK Komovi | Andrijevica | 3rd | 1934 |
| FK Napredak | Berane | 3rd | 1994 |
| FK Petnjica | Petnjica | 3rd | 1977 |
| FK Pljevlja | Pljevlja | 3rd | 1997 |
| FK Rudar | Pljevlja | 1st | 1920 |

== Former clubs ==
During the past, many clubs that existed for some time were dissolved, temporarily closed, merged with another club or today have only teams that participate in youth leagues.

== See also ==
- Montenegrin First League
- Montenegrin Second League
- Montenegrin Third League
- Montenegrin Cup
- Montenegrin Regional Cups
