= 2008–09 Montenegrin Cup =

Tournament details
- Country: Montenegro
- Teams: 30

Final positions
- Champions: Petrovac (1st title)
- Runners-up: Lovćen

Tournament statistics
- Matches played: 43
- Goals scored: 85 (1.98 per match)

The 2008–09 Montenegrin Cup was the third season of the Montenegrin knockout football tournament. The winner of the tournament received a berth in the second qualifying round of the 2009–10 UEFA Europa League. The defending champions were Mogren, who beat Budućnost in the final of the 2007–08 competition. The competition featured 30 teams. It started on 17 September 2008 and ended with the final on 13 May 2009.

== First round ==
The 14 matches were played on 17 and 18 September 2008.

Team 1	Score	Team 2
Bokelj	0–1	Rudar
Jezero	2–0	Bratstvo
Zabjelo	0–4	Zeta
Zora	0–1	Dečić
Blue Star	0–0 (2–4 p)	Sutjeska
Kom	3–1	Arsenal
Berane	1–1 (5–6 p)	Lovćen
Pljevlja	0–1	Petrovac
Jedinstvo	3–0	Čelik
Sloga	0–2	Otrant
Cetinje	1–0	Ibar
Ribnica	0–2	Mornar
Mladost	1–0	Grbalj
Napredak	0–3	Crvena Stijena
Mogren	bye	
Budućnost	bye	

== Second round ==
The first legs were played on 22 October and the second legs were played on 5 November 2008.

Team 1	Agg.	Team 2	1st leg	2nd leg
Lovćen	3–1	Jezero	2–0	1–1
Rudar	3–2	Mladost	2–1	1–1
Zeta	2–4	Jedinstvo	2–2	0–2
Crvena Stijena	0–5	Mogren	0–2	0–3
Petrovac	5–0	Otrant	2–0	3–0
Mornar	2–1	Kom	2–0	0–1
Cetinje	0–2	Sutjeska	0–0	0–2
Budućnost	6–0	Dečić	4–0	2–0

== Quarter-finals ==
The first legs were played on 26 November and second on 10 December 2008.

=== Summary ===
Team 1	Agg.	Team 2	1st leg	2nd leg
Budućnost	3–1	Mornar	3–1	0–0
Sutjeska	1–1 (3–4 p)	Lovćen	1–0	0–1
Mogren	1–3	Petrovac	1–2	0–1
Jedinstvo	0–6	Rudar	0–1	0–5

=== First legs ===
26 November 2008	Budućnost	3–1	Mornar	Podgorica
13:00 CET	Ajković 22'; Bećiraj 58', 65'	Report	Mirković 14'	Stadium: Podgorica City Stadium; Referee: Željko Radunović

26 November 2008	Sutjeska	1–0	Lovćen	Nikšić
13:00 CET	Todorović 5'	Report		Stadium: Gradski stadion Referee: Dražen Petrić

26 November 2008	Mogren	1–2	Petrovac	Budva
13:00 CET	Zec 90'	Report	Divanović 22'; Lopičić 78'	Stadium: Stadion Lugovi; Referee: Vojin Vojinović

26 November 2008	Jedinstvo	0–1	Rudar	Golubovci
13:00 CET		Report	Ranđelović 80'	Stadium: Stadion Trešnjica; Referee: Milovan Milačić

=== Second legs ===
10 December 2008	Lovćen	1–0 (1–1 agg.) (4–3 p)	Sutjeska	Cetinje
13:00 CET	Nikolić 30'	Report		Stadium: Stadion Obilića poljana Referee: Ranko Spasojević

10 December 2008	Petrovac	1–0 (3–1 agg.)	Mogren	Petrovac
13:00 CET	Kačinario 90'	Report		Stadium: Stadion pod Malim brdom Referee: Nikola Dabanović

10 December 2008	Rudar	5–0 (6–0 agg.)	Jedinstvo	Pljevlja
13:00 CET	Useni 21'; Ranđelović 40', 84'; Nedović 69'; Ivanišević 90'	Report		Stadium: Gradski stadion Referee: Miloš Bošković

12 December 2008	Mornar	0–0 (1–3 agg.)	Budućnost	Bar
13:00 CET		Report		Stadium: Stadion Topolica; Referee: Pavle Radovanović

== Semi-finals ==
The first legs were played on 15 April and second on 29 April 2009.

=== Summary ===
Team 1	Agg.	Team 2	1st leg	2nd leg
Budućnost	2–2 (a)	Lovćen	1–2	1–0
Rudar	0–0 (3–5 p)	Petrovac	0–0	0–0

=== First legs ===
15 April 2009	Rudar	0–0	Petrovac	Rožaje
16:00 CEST		Report		Stadium: Stadion Bandžovo Brdo; Referee: Ranko Spasojević

15 April 2009	Budućnost	1–2	Lovćen	Podgorica
20:00 CEST	Bećiraj 87'	Report	Mešter (??), 75'	Stadium: Podgorica City Stadium; Referee: Željko Mićović

=== Second legs ===
29 April 2009	Lovćen	0–1 (2(a)–2 agg.)	Budućnost	Cetinje
16:30 CEST		Report	Vukčević 54'	Stadium: Stadion Obilića poljana Referee: Nikola Dabanović

29 April 2009	Petrovac	0–0 (0–0 agg.) (5–3 p)	Rudar	Petrovac
16:00 CEST		Report		Stadium: Stadion pod Malim brdom Referee: Jovan Kaluđerović
	Penalties
	Dragićević (penalty scored); Divanović (penalty scored); Lakić (penalty scored); Mikijelj (penalty scored); Lopičić (penalty scored)		(penalty scored) Useni; (penalty scored) Ivanišević; (penalty scored) Reljić; (penalty missed) Ranđelović

== Final ==
13 May 2009
20:15 CEST

Lovćen	0–1 (a.e.t.)	Petrovac
		Rotković 118'

Podgorica City Stadium, Podgorica
Attendance: 4,000
Referee: Pavle Radovanović
