= 2024–25 Montenegrin Second League =

Montenegrin Second League
- Season: 2024–25
- Dates: 12 August 2024 – 24 May 2025
- Champions: Mladost (2nd title)
- Promoted: Mladost
- Relegated: Ibar

The 2024–25 Montenegrin Second League (also known as 2.CFL) was the 19th season since the establishment of the Montenegrin Second League. The season began on 10 August 2024.

== Format of competition ==
A total of nine teams participate this edition of the Second League. The new members are Rudar and Mladost, who were relegated from 2023–24 Montenegrin First League, and winners of Montenegrin Third League playoffs - Ibar. Third League play-off finalists Budva and Zeta were both suspended for match fixing in the last match of the play-off round, which saw both teams advance following a controversial 3–3 draw (reducing the number of Second League teams by one).

At the end of the season, the winner is automatically promoted to Montenegrin First League and the 2nd and 3rd-placed teams play promotion play-offs. Due to changes in the Montenegrin Third League play-off round, in which only the first placed team goes directly in Second league and due to the fact that nine clubs participate in the Second League for the 2024—25 season, at the end of the season no club is directly relegated, while the eighth and ninth placed plays play-off with the second and third placed teams of Third League play-off round.

== Teams ==
The following nine clubs compete this season.

Locations of the 2024–25 teams

Club	City	2024–25 position	Stadium	Floodlights
Grbalj	Radanovići	4th	Stadion Donja Sutvara (1,500)	No
Ibar	Rožaje	1st in Third League – North	Bandžovo Brdo Stadium (3,000)	Yes
Igalo	Igalo	5th	Stadion Solila (1,600)	No
Iskra	Danilovgrad	6th	Braća Velašević Stadium (2,500)	Yes
Kom	Podgorica	7th	Stadion Zlatica (1,200)	Yes
Lovćen	Cetinje	8th	Stadion Sveti Petar Cetinjski (5,192)	Yes
Mladost	Podgorica	9th in First League	DG Arena (4,300)	Yes
Podgorica	Podgorica	3rd	DG Arena (4,300)	Yes
Rudar	Pljevlja	10th in First League	Stadion pod Golubinjom (5,140)	Yes

== League table ==
Pos	Team	Pld	W	D	L	GF	GA	GD	Pts	Promotion or qualification
1	Mladost (C, P)	32	21	7	4	54	24	+30	70	Promotion to the Montenegrin First League
2	Rudar	32	17	9	6	56	31	+25	60	Qualification for the Montenegrin First League play-off
3	Lovćen	32	14	9	9	50	38	+12	51	Qualification for the Montenegrin First League play-off
4	Igalo	32	13	9	10	52	35	+17	48	
5	Iskra	32	11	9	12	37	36	+1	42	
6	Grbalj	32	9	10	13	33	49	−16	37	
7	Podgorica	32	7	12	13	42	54	−12	33	
8	Kom (O)	32	7	7	18	28	54	−26	28	Qualification for the Montenegrin Second League play-off
9	Ibar (R)	32	6	6	20	23	54	−31	24	Qualification for the Montenegrin Second League play-off

Source: Football Association of Montenegro (in Montenegrin)
Rules for classification: 1) Points; 2) Head-to-head points; 3) Head-to-head goal difference; 4) Head-to-head goals scored; 5) Goal difference; 6) Goals scored; 7) Draw.
(C) Champions; (O) Play-off winners; (P) Promoted; (R) Relegated

== Results ==
Home \ Away	GRB	IBA	IGA	ISK	KOM	LOV	MLA	POD	RUD	GRB	IBA	IGA	ISK	KOM	LOV	MLA	POD	RUD
Grbalj	—	2–0	0–2	0–2	1–0	0–4	0–2	1–0	2–5	—	2–1	1–1	1–1	3–0	2–2	0–2	4–3	1–1
Ibar	0–1	—	0–2	0–1	2–0	1–1	1–1	3–1	1–2	2–0	—	0–0	0–0	2–1	0–1	1–2	0–1	0–4
Igalo	0–1	3–2	—	1–0	3–0	2–0	2–4	2–2	1–1	2–0	5–0	—	0–1	8–0	2–1	0–2	3–2	2–2
Iskra	3–1	1–0	1–2	—	3–0	0–2	0–3	1–1	0–2	1–1	4–2	1–2	—	3–1	1–2	0–1	4–0	0–2
Kom	0–1	1–0	1–1	1–1	—	1–3	0–1	0–4	1–0	1–1	4–1	1–0	0–0	—	0–0	2–4	3–0	4–1
Lovćen	1–0	1–2	1–0	2–0	3–0	—	1–1	1–4	2–3	1–1	4–0	1–1	3–4	2–1	—	2–2	1–5	2–0
Mladost	2–0	2–0	1–0	3–0	1–0	1–0	—	1–1	1–1	2–1	4–0	2–0	1–0	2–2	0–3	—	2–0	0–0
Podgorica	2–2	0–0	1–1	1–1	0–0	3–1	0–2	—	0–3	1–1	0–1	2–2	1–1	0–2	1–1	2–1	—	2–1
Rudar	1–1	1–1	1–0	0–0	1–0	0–0	3–0	5–2	—	4–1	2–0	3–2	0–2	2–1	0–1	2–1	3–0	—

Source: Football Association of Montenegro (in Montenegrin)
Legend: Blue = home team win; Yellow = draw; Red = away team win.
For upcoming matches, an "a" indicates there is an article about the rivalry between the two participants.

== Montenegrin Second League play-off ==
The eighth and ninth-placed teams (Kom and Ibar) each faced the third and second-placed teams of the 2024–25 Montenegrin Third League (Sloga Bar and Internacional) for the final two places in the 2025–26 Montenegrin Second League.

=== Summary ===
Team 1	Score	Team 2
Internacional	0–0 (5–3 p)	Ibar
Kom	3–1	Sloga Bar

=== Matches ===
28 May 2025
17:00 CEST

Internacional	0–0	Ibar
	Report
Penalties
Ćorović (penalty scored); Mujović (penalty scored); Šoć (penalty scored); Obradović (penalty scored); Dajević (penalty scored)	5–3	(penalty scored) Terzić; (penalty scored) Hodžić; (penalty scored) Vlaović; (penalty missed) Šekularac

Gradski stadion, Bijelo Polje
Attendance: 300
Referee: Nikola Vođević
28 May 2025
19:00 CEST

Kom	3–1	Sloga Bar
Sili 2'; Mihaljević 72', 90+6'	Report	Habibović 52'

Stadion pod Vrmcem, Kotor
Attendance: 120
Referee: Davor Božović

== See also ==
- Montenegrin Second League
- 2024–25 Montenegrin First League
- 2024–25 Montenegrin Third League (srwiki)
