= 2014–15 Montenegrin Second League =

Montenegrin Second League
- Season: 2014–15
- Champions: Iskra
- Promoted: Iskra; Dečić
- Relegated: Zabjelo; Arsenal
- Matches: 198
- Goals: 475 (2.4 per match)
- Top goalscorer: Sava Gardašević (Dečić) (19 goals)

The 2014–15 Montenegrin Second League (Serbian: Druga Crnogorska Liga / Друга црногорска лига) was the ninth season of the competition as the second top football league in Montenegro. The league played its first games of the season on August 17, 2014 and its final matches were played on May 30, 2015.

== Format of competition ==
Twelve teams participate in this league. The top team directly qualifies for the Montenegrin First League while the second and third teams contest in a two matches playoff against the 11th and 12th team from the First League. The two bottom-placed teams are relegated to the Third League, to be replaced by the two winners of the Third League promotion play-off.

== Teams ==
Locations of the 2014–15 teams

The following 12 clubs competed in this season.

| Club | City | Finishing in 2013–14 | Stadium |
|---|---|---|---|
| Arsenal | Tivat | 5th | Stadion u Parku (4,000) |
| Bratstvo | Podgorica | 11th | Stadion Bratstva (200) |
| Cetinje | Cetinje | 7th | Stadion Obilića Poljana (5,000) |
| Dečić | Tuzi | 12th in First League | Stadion Tuško Polje (3,000) |
| Ibar | Rožaje | 10th | Bandžovo brdo (4,000) |
| Igalo | Igalo | 9th | Solila (1,600) |
| Iskra | Danilovgrad | 1st in Third League - Central | Braća Velašević (2,000) |
| Jedinstvo | Bijelo Polje | 8th | Gradski stadion (5,000) |
| Jezero | Plav | 3rd | Stadion Pod Racinom (5,000) |
| Kom | Podgorica | 6th | Zlatica (1,000) |
| Radnički | Berane | 1st in Third League - North | Gradski stadion (11,000) |
| Zabjelo | Podgorica | 12th | Stadion Zabjela (1,000) |

== League table ==
| Pos | Team | Pld | W | D | L | GF | GA | GD | Pts | Promotion or relegation |
|---|---|---|---|---|---|---|---|---|---|---|
| 1 | Iskra (C, P) | 33 | 20 | 7 | 6 | 55 | 26 | +29 | 67 | Promotion to the First League |
| 2 | Dečić (Note: Dečić were deducted 1 point.) (O, P) | 33 | 20 | 6 | 7 | 58 | 28 | +30 | 65 | Qualification for the promotion play-offs |
| 3 | Igalo | 33 | 16 | 12 | 5 | 42 | 24 | +18 | 60 | Qualification for the promotion play-offs |
| 4 | Jedinstvo | 33 | 12 | 12 | 9 | 28 | 29 | −1 | 48 | |
| 5 | Radnički | 33 | 13 | 6 | 14 | 50 | 39 | +11 | 45 | |
| 6 | Kom | 33 | 9 | 13 | 11 | 35 | 38 | −3 | 40 | |
| 7 | Cetinje | 33 | 11 | 6 | 16 | 36 | 54 | −18 | 39 | |
| 8 | Ibar | 33 | 9 | 10 | 14 | 31 | 41 | −10 | 37 | |
| 9 | Jezero | 33 | 9 | 10 | 14 | 34 | 45 | −11 | 37 | |
| 10 | Bratstvo | 33 | 10 | 6 | 17 | 38 | 58 | −20 | 36 | |
| 11 | Zabjelo (Note: Zabjelo were deducted 1 point.) (R) | 33 | 10 | 7 | 16 | 38 | 46 | −8 | 36 | Relegation to the Third League |
| 12 | Arsenal (R) | 33 | 9 | 5 | 19 | 30 | 47 | −17 | 32 | Relegation to the Third League |

Source: Football Association of Montenegro (in Montenegrin),
Rules for classification: 1) Points; 2) Head-to-head points; 3) Head-to-head goal difference; 4) Head-to-head goals scored; 5) Head-to-head away goals scored; 6) Goal difference; 7) Goals scored; 8) Draw.
(C) Champions; (O) Play-off winners; (P) Promoted; (R) Relegated

== Results ==
The schedule consists of three rounds. During the first two rounds, each team played each other once home-and-away for a total of 22 games. The pairings of the third round were then set according to the standings after the first two rounds, giving every team a third game against each opponent for a total of 33 games per team.

=== First and second round ===
| Home \ Away | ARS | BRA | CET | DEČ | IBA | IGA | ISK | JED | JEZ | KOM | RAD | ZAB |
|---|---|---|---|---|---|---|---|---|---|---|---|---|
| Arsenal | | 1–2 | 0–1 | 2–5 | 2–0 | 1–3 | 0–1 | 0–1 | 2–1 | 0–3 | 1–0 | 0–0 |
| Bratstvo | 0–0 | | 0–2 | 1–3 | 2–0 | 0–0 | 2–3 | 0–1 | 1–1 | 0–2 | 4–0 | 3–3 |
| Cetinje | 1–0 | 1–1 | | 1–2 | 1–0 | 0–2 | 2–1 | 2–1 | 0–0 | 4–1 | 2–0 | 0–2 |
| Dečić | 2–0 | 3–1 | 3–1 | | 3–1 | 0–1 | 0–0 | 3–1 | 4–1 | 1–1 | 1–0 | 1–0 |
| Ibar | 1–1 | 1–1 | 1–0 | 2–1 | | 0–0 | 2–2 | 1–1 | 2–0 | 0–0 | 1–5 | 1–1 |
| Igalo | 3–1 | 3–1 | 1–1 | 3–1 | 2–1 | | 1–1 | 4–0 | 1–0 | 0–0 | 1–1 | 2–1 |
| Iskra | 5–0 | 6–1 | 1–1 | 2–1 | 1–0 | 1–0 | | 2–0 | 1–0 | 1–1 | 2–1 | 3–0 |
| Jedinstvo | 1–1 | 2–1 | 0–0 | 0–0 | 0–0 | 1–1 | 0–0 | | 1–0 | 3–1 | 1–0 | 2–1 |
| Jezero | 0–3 | 3–0 | 0–1 | 0–2 | 2–1 | 1–1 | 0–3 | 1–0 | | 1–1 | 1–0 | 0–0 |
| Kom | 1–1 | 4–1 | 3–0 | 0–0 | 2–0 | 0–1 | 3–0 | 0–0 | 0–0 | | 1–0 | 0–0 |
| Radnički | 4–0 | 3–1 | 3–1 | 0–4 | 0–0 | 2–2 | 3–0 | 2–0 | 1–2 | 3–3 | | 2–0 |
| Zabjelo | 0–3 | 0–1 | 2–0 | 3–0 | 0–4 | 1–0 | 0–2 | 1–0 | 0–2 | 3–1 | 0–1 | |

Source: Football Association of Montenegro (in Montenegrin)
Legend: Blue = home team win; Yellow = draw; Red = away team win.

=== Third round ===
| Home \ Away | ARS | BRA | CET | DEČ | IBA | IGA | ISK | JED | JEZ | KOM | RAD | ZAB |
|---|---|---|---|---|---|---|---|---|---|---|---|---|
| Arsenal | | | 3–0 | | | 0–1 | 3–2 | | | | 1–2 | 3–1 |
| Bratstvo | 1–0 | | | | 2–0 | | | | 1–3 | | 3–2 | 2–1 |
| Cetinje | | 4–0 | | | 0–1 | 1–2 | 0–2 | 1–1 | 5–4 | | | |
| Dečić | 2–0 | 2–0 | 5–1 | | | 2–1 | | | | | 1–0 | 2–0 |
| Ibar | 1–0 | | | 2–2 | | | | 2–1 | 1–2 | 3–0 | | |
| Igalo | | 0–2 | | | 0–1 | | 3–2 | 0–0 | 1–0 | 0–0 | | |
| Iskra | | 2–0 | | 1–0 | 2–0 | | | 1–0 | 3–0 | 0–1 | | |
| Jedinstvo | 1–0 | 2–1 | | 1–0 | | | | | | 1–0 | 0–0 | 3–1 |
| Jezero | 1–0 | | | 0–0 | | | | 2–2 | | 3–3 | | 2–2 |
| Kom | 0–1 | 0–2 | 1–0 | 1–2 | | | | | | | 0–1 | 1–6 |
| Radnički | | | 6–0 | | 4–1 | 0–1 | 1–1 | | 2–1 | | | |
| Zabjelo | | | 5–2 | | 1–0 | 1–1 | 0–1 | | | | 2–1 | |

Source: Football Association of Montenegro (in Montenegrin)
Legend: Blue = home team win; Yellow = draw; Red = away team win.

== Promotion play-offs ==
The 3rd-placed team (against the 10th-placed team of the First League) and the runners-up (against the 11th-placed team of the First League) will both compete in two-legged promotion play-offs after the end of the season.

=== Summary ===
| Team 1 | Agg. | Team 2 | 1st leg | 2nd leg |
|---|---|---|---|---|
| Mornar | 2–2 (9–8 p) | Igalo | 2–0 | 0–2 |
| Mogren | 1–7 | Dečić | 0–5 | 1–2 |

=== Matches ===
3 June 2015
17:30 CEST

| Mornar | 2–0 | Igalo |
|---|---|---|
| Kim Young-Seop 22'; B. Ivanović 89' |

Stadion Topolica, Bar
Attendance: 600
Referee: Milovan Milačić
7 June 2015
17:30 CEST

| Igalo | 2–0 (a.e.t.) | Mornar |
|---|---|---|
| Mrdak 16'; M. Kovačević 80' |
Penalties
| Koprivica (penalty scored); Đurković (penalty scored); Bigović (penalty scored); Vujović (penalty scored); Mrdak (penalty scored); Ćuković (penalty scored); Šćepanović (penalty scored); Mijata (penalty scored); Kovačević (penalty missed); Bumbar (penalty missed) | 8–9 | (penalty scored) Vojvodić; (penalty scored) Mrvaljević (penalty scored) Lalošević; (penalty scored) Pejović; (penalty scored) Karadžić; (penalty scored) Jovančov; (penalty scored) Marković; (penalty scored) Kim Young-Seop; (penalty missed) Kalezić; (penalty scored) Ivanović |

Stadion Solila, Igalo
Attendance: 1,500
Referee: Miloš Novović

2–2 on aggregate. Mornar won 9–8 on penalties.

3 June 2015
17:30 CEST

| Mogren | 0–5 | Dečić |
|---|---|---|
| | | Camaj 7'; I. Mijušković 32', 62'; Ramović 61'; N. Đurković 81' |

Stadion Lugovi, Budva
Attendance: 700
Referee: Mileta Šćepanović
7 June 2015
17:30 CEST

| Dečić | 2–1 | Mogren |
|---|---|---|
| Anđušić 24', 39' | | Poček 62' |

Stadion Tuško Polje, Tuzi
Attendance: 1,000
Referee: Miloš Savović

Dečić won 7–1 on aggregate.

== Top scorers ==
| Rank | Scorer | Club | Goals |
|---|---|---|---|
| 1 | (Montenegro) Sava Gardašević | Dečić | 19 |
| 2 | (Montenegro) Uroš Đuranović | Iskra | 18 |
| 3 | (Montenegro) Ivan Asanović | Radnički | 14 |
| 4 | (Montenegro) Fatmir Molabećirović | Ibar | 12 |
| 5 | (Montenegro) Aldin Adžović | Dečić | 11 |
| 5 | (Montenegro) Vuk Vulević | Radnički | 11 |
| 7 | (Montenegro) Miodrag Kovačević | Igalo | 10 |
| 7 | (Montenegro) Siniša Stanisavić | Bratstvo | 10 |
| 9 | (Montenegro) Ivan Maraš | Bratstvo | 8 |
| 9 | (Montenegro) Ivan Mijušković | Dečić | 8 |
