= OFK Federal =

- Full name: Omladinski Fudbalski Klub Federal
- Founded: 2010
- Dissolved: 2014
- Ground: Stadion Safari, Ulcinj, Montenegro
- Capacity: 500
- Coordinates: 41.907174°N 19.264703°E
- Director: Zoran Gojnić
- Manager: Xhemal Kaplanbegu
- League: Third League - South Region
Home colours

OFK Federal is a defunct Montenegrin football club based in the town of Ulcinj. OFK Federal played their matches at their Stadion Safari.

Federal started as a football club for juniors in 2008, but on 1 October 2010 they were officially registered as a club. In 2013, it was created the senior team and in 2014 the club was officially dissolved.

== Players ==
=== Final squad ===
As of 12 September 2013

Note: Flags indicate national team as defined under FIFA eligibility rules; some limited exceptions apply. Players may hold more than one non-FIFA nationality.

No.	Pos.	Nation	Player
—	DF	MNE	Dušan Bugarin
—		MNE	Zenel Radaj
—		MNE	Agon Kolari
—		MNE	Osman Mustafić
—		MNE	Driton Civlaku
—		MNE	Jakup Betuzi
—		MNE	Aljnion Sefa
—		MNE	Adi Alović
—		MNE	Arber Markashi
—		MNE	Andin Hoxha
—		MNE	Adnan Kalezić
—	MF	MNE	Đovalin Kočović
—		MNE	Rahman Beharović
—		MNE	Ardijan Hadžemović
—	FW	MNE	Fatmir Molabećirović

No.	Pos.	Nation	Player
—		MNE	Muharem Aličković
—		MNE	Semir Gurzaković
—	GK	MNE	Arben Mećikukić
—		MNE	Arijan Seniković (team captain)
—		MNE	Valjmir Perezić
—	MF	MNE	Adnan Alibegu
—		MNE	Osman Gurzaković
—		MNE	Amir Ramović
—		MNE	Mehmed Bisha
—		MNE	Bekim Ljuković
—	FW	MNE	Mario Kačinari
—	MF	MNE	Halil Dali Truma
—		MNE	Herodit Sinani
—		MNE	Ljuljzim Paljević

== Record ==
=== 2013-14 Montenegrin Third League ===
Round	Ground	Opponent	Score
1	H	FK Orjen Zelenika	3 - 1
2	A	FK Hajduk Bar	4 - 2
3	H	FK Sloga Bar	4 - 0
4	A	FK Sloga Radović	4 - 0
5	Free round		
6	A	FK Orjen Zelenika	3 - 0
7	H	FK Hajduk Bar	5 - 3
8	A	FK Sloga Bar	5 - 1
9	H	FK Sloga Radović	4 - 1
10	Free round		
11	H	FK Orjen Zelenika	2 - 0
12	A	FK Hajduk Bar	3 - 4
13	H	FK Sloga Bar	1 - 0
14	A	FK Sloga Radović	2 - 1
15	Free round		
16	A	FK Orjen Zelenika	2 - 1
17	H	FK Hajduk Bar	2 - 3
18	A	FK Sloga Bar	2 - 1
19	H	FK Sloga Radović	0 - 0
20	Free round		
21	H	FK Orjen Zelenika	0 - 0
22	A	FK Hajduk Bar	1 - 2
23	H	FK Sloga Bar	1 - 0
24	A	FK Sloga Radović	0 - 3
25	Free round		
26	A	FK Orjen Zelenika	5 - 1
27	H	FK Hajduk Bar	1 - 1
28	A	FK Sloga Bar	2 - 0
29	H	FK Sloga Radović	1 - 1
30	Free round		

=== 2013-14 Playoffs to Montenegrin Second League ===
Round	Ground	Opponent	Score
1	Free round		
2	H	FK Iskra Danilovgrad	1 - 0
3	A	FK Radnički Berane	0 - 2
4	Free round		
5	A	FK Iskra Danilovgrad	0 - 2
5	H	FK Radnički Berane	0 - 1

=== 2013 Kupa e Pavarsisë ===
Round	Ground	Opponent	Score
Semi-final	N	KS Flamurtari Vlorë	0 - 2
