= FK Budva =

Montenegrin football club

- Full name: Fudblaski klub Budva
- Short name: BUD
- Founded: 2015; 11 years ago
- Stadium: Stadion Lugovi
- Capacity: 1,500
- Coordinates: 42.286328°N 18.850715°E
- Manager: Milorad Malovrazić
- League: Montenegrin Third League
- 2024–25: 2nd of 7, Montenegrin Third League
Home colours

FK Budva (Montenegrin: Cyrillic: ФК Будва/Фудбалски клуб Будва, Latin: Fudbalski klub Budva pronounced [fûdbalskiː klûːb bûdʋa]) is an amateur association football club based in Budva, Montenegro. The club was founded in 2015 and plays its home matches at Stadion Lugovi.

== History ==
=== Early ages (2015–2020) ===
FK Budva was founded in 2015 by Vasilije Bubanja and Slavko Đukanović following the decline of FK Mogren. Driven by local enthusiasts and football lovers in Budva, the club started competing in the youth leagues of Montenegro. The goal of the new football club was to bring FK Budva up to the Montenegrin Second League and beyond. FK Budva was originally founded as a youth football team with seven different youth categories, but over time a senior team was established to compete in the 2020–21 Montenegrin Third League.

=== Montenegrin Third League (2020–present) ===
In 2020, FK Budva’s first senior team was formed to compete in the 2020–21 Montenegrin Third League South. During their first season in the Montenegrin Third League, Budva finished third behind Orjen and Cetinje. The 2021–22 season was an improvement for Budva. They held first place for much of the campaign, but the title-deciding match came on the final matchday against Otrant-Olympic. Budva needed only a draw to secure a place in the play-offs for the Montenegrin Second League, but Otrant-Olympic won 2–1 at Stadion Lugovi and later triumphed in the play-offs, earning promotion to the Montenegrin Second League along with OFK Nikšić. Budva finished in second place with 52 points, just one point behind Otrant-Olympic. The match between FK Budva and Otrant-Olympic broke the record for the highest attendance in the Montenegrin Third League, with over 1,000 spectators. In the 2022–23 season, Budva once again finished in second place, with Lovćen taking first. Lovćen went on to earn promotion to the Montenegrin Second League along with Internacional.

The logo of the Montenegrin Third League South

During the 2023–24 season, Budva won the Montenegrin Third League South, winning all 18 matches and finishing 17 points ahead of second-placed FK Akademija. One of Budva’s players, Deni Piranić, was the league’s top scorer with 18 goals, while his teammate Stefan Božović finished second with 17. Budva qualified for the Montenegrin Second League play-offs against Ibar and Zeta. Budva played their first match of the Montenegrin Second League play-offs against Ibar. The game ended 1–1 in regular time after goals from Vuk Dapčević (Ibar) and Marko Ćosić (Budva), with Ibar eventually winning 8–7 on penalties. In the last match of the play-offs, Zeta took a 3–0 lead against Budva, but by the 54th minute, Budva had managed to equalize. The match ended 3–3 at full time, and Budva won 4–2 in the penalty shootout, earning promotion to the Montenegrin Second League for the first time in their history. After the final play-off match of the 2023–24 season, concerns about the match were raised by spectators and officials. The Football Association of Montenegro launched an official investigation into Budva and Zeta. Following the investigation, Budva and Zeta were found guilty of match-fixing. Budva player Marko Stijepović was suspended from participating in any Montenegrin Third League matches for 18 months, and both Budva and Zeta were barred from earning promotion to the Montenegrin Second League the following season.

During the 2024–25 Montenegrin Third League, Budva finished in second place behind Sloga Stari Bar with 44 points. As of the 2025–26 season, Budva participates in the 2025–26 Montenegrin Third League South.

== Youth academy ==
The youth system of FK Budva plays a major role in the club. FK Budva is well known for its youth academy, which has over 200 members across seven different age groups, including U-19, U-17, U-16, U-14, U-12, and U-10. The club also offers free memberships to its youth academy. Notable graduates of the FK Budva academy include Ognjen Bakić, who has played for clubs such as Olimpija Ljubljana and Trabzonspor, and Strahinja Tešović, who has played for Rijeka. FK Budva’s youth team competes in leagues such as the U-17 Montenegrin Southern League, alongside the youth teams of Bokelj and Arsenal Tivat.

== Honours ==
- Montenegrin Third League
  - Winners (1): 2023–24

== Stadium ==
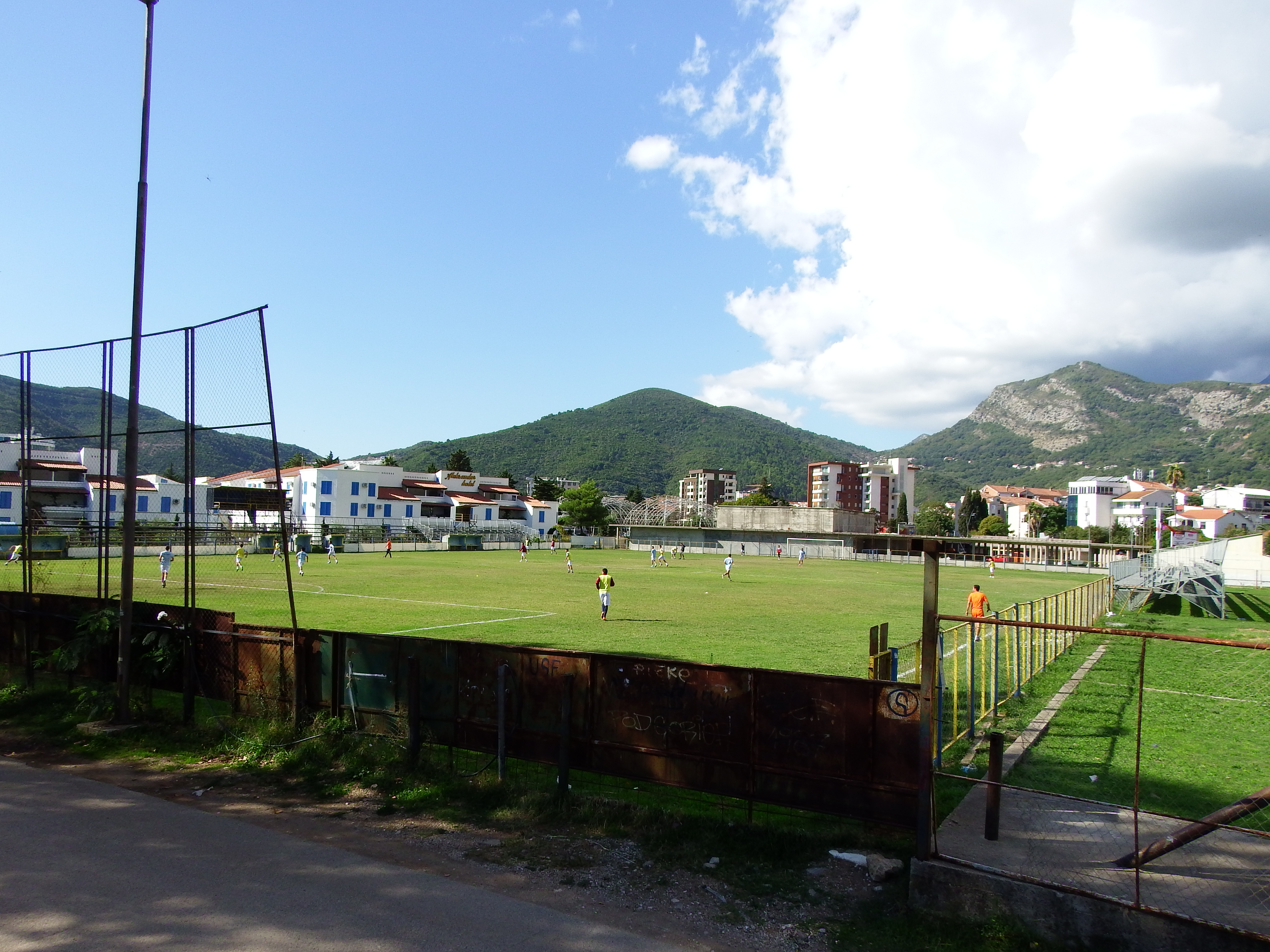
Stadion Lugovi

FK Budva play their home matches at Stadion Lugovi, located in Budva, Montenegro. The stadium was constructed in 1960 and last renovated in 1990. It has a total capacity of 1,500 spectators, with a west stand and an east stand, each accommodating 750. The pitch measures 110 × 70 metres (or 360 feet × 230 feet). Stadion Lugovi does not meet UEFA standards for hosting European competitions. Prior to its dissolution, FK Mogren also used Stadion Lugovi as its home ground.

== See also ==
- Montenegrin Third League
- Budva
- FK Mogren
- Stadion Lugovi
