= 2016–17 Montenegrin Second League =

Montenegrin Second League
- Season: 2016–17
- Dates: 14 August 2016 – 27 May 2017
- Champions: Kom
- Promoted: Kom
- Relegated: Radnički; Bratstvo; Grafičar
- Matches: 165
- Goals: 399 (2.42 per match)
- Top goalscorer: Stefan Milošević (Kom) (20 goals)
- Biggest home win: Kom 8–0 Čelik (2 October 2016)
- Biggest away win: Radnički 0–7 Berane (21 May 2017)
- Highest scoring: Kom 8–0 Čelik (2 October 2016) Berane 5–3 Radnički (25 March 2017) Radnički 2–6 Kom (8 April 2017)

The 2016–17 Montenegrin Second League was the eleventh season since the establishment of the Montenegrin Second League. The season ran from 14 August 2016 to May 2017.

== Format of competition ==
A total of 12 teams participate in this edition of the Second League. New members are FK Mornar Bar who was relegated from 2015–16 Montenegrin First League, and winners of Montenegrin Third League playoffs - FK Čelik Nikšić and FK Otrant-Olympic Ulcinj.

== Teams ==
Locations of the 2016–17 teams

The following 12 clubs competed in this season.

| Club | City | Finishing in 2015–16 | Stadium |
|---|---|---|---|
| Berane | Berane | 4th | Gradski stadion (11,000) |
| Bratstvo | Cijevna | 3rd | Stadion Bratstva (500) |
| Cetinje | Cetinje | 2nd | Stadion Obilića Poljana (2,000) |
| Čelik | Nikšić | 1st in Third League - Center | Stadion Željezare (2,000) |
| Grafičar | Podgorica | 7th | Camp FSCG (1,250) |
| Ibar | Rožaje | 8th | Bandžovo brdo (4,000) |
| Igalo | Igalo | 9th | Solila (1,000) |
| Jezero | Plav | 10th | Stadion pod Racinom (5,000) |
| Kom | Podgorica | 5th | Zlatica (1,000) |
| Mornar | Bar | 12th in First League | Topolica (2,500) |
| Otrant-Olympic | Ulcinj | 1st in Third League - South | Stadion Olympic (1,500) |
| Radnički | Berane | 6th | Gradski stadion (11,000) |

== League table ==
| Pos | Team | Pld | W | D | L | GF | GA | GD | Pts | Promotion or relegation |
|---|---|---|---|---|---|---|---|---|---|---|
| 1 | Kom (C, P) | 30 | 18 | 8 | 4 | 67 | 21 | +46 | 62 | Promotion to the First League |
| 2 | Ibar | 30 | 18 | 6 | 6 | 42 | 16 | +26 | 60 | Qualification for the promotion play-offs |
| 3 | Otrant-Olympic (Note: Otrant were deducted 1 point.) | 30 | 15 | 7 | 8 | 32 | 22 | +10 | 51 | Qualification for the promotion play-offs |
| 4 | Mornar | 30 | 13 | 10 | 7 | 37 | 21 | +16 | 49 | |
| 5 | Jezero | 30 | 12 | 8 | 10 | 34 | 26 | +8 | 44 | |
| 6 | Berane (Note: Berane were deducted 3 points.) | 30 | 12 | 8 | 10 | 46 | 43 | +3 | 41 | |
| 7 | Cetinje | 30 | 11 | 6 | 13 | 27 | 35 | −8 | 39 | |
| 8 | Igalo | 30 | 10 | 4 | 16 | 30 | 43 | −13 | 34 | |
| 9 | Čelik (Note: Čelik were deducted 4 points.) | 30 | 9 | 4 | 17 | 26 | 47 | −21 | 27 | |
| 10 | Radnički (R) | 30 | 6 | 6 | 18 | 31 | 68 | −37 | 24 | Relegation to the Third League |
| 11 | Bratstvo (R) | 30 | 4 | 7 | 19 | 27 | 57 | −30 | 19 | Relegation to the Third League |
| 12 | Grafičar (Note: Grafičar were excluded from the league for not showing up at two matches.) (R) | 0 | 0 | 0 | 0 | 0 | 0 | 0 | 0 | Relegation to the Third League |

Source: Football Association of Montenegro (in Montenegrin)
Rules for classification: 1) Points; 2) Head-to-head points; 3) Head-to-head goal difference; 4) Head-to-head goals scored; 5) Head-to-head away goals scored; 6) Goal difference; 7) Goals scored; 8) Draw.
(C) Champions; (P) Promoted; (R) Relegated

== Results ==
The schedule consists of three rounds. During the first two rounds, each team played each other once home-and-away for a total of 22 games. The pairings of the third round were then set according to the standings after the first two rounds, giving every team a third game against each opponent for a total of 33 games per team.

=== First and second round ===
| Home \ Away | BER | BRA | CET | ČEL | GRA | IBA | IGA | JEZ | KOM | MOR | OTR | RAD |
|---|---|---|---|---|---|---|---|---|---|---|---|---|
| Berane | — | 2–3 | 0–0 | 2–0 | 2–1 | 0–6 | 3–1 | 2–0 | 2–2 | 1–2 | 0–0 | 5–3 |
| Bratstvo | 1–2 | — | 0–2 | 2–4 | — | 0–1 | 1–0 | 2–2 | 0–0 | 1–1 | 0–0 | 0–0 |
| Cetinje | 0–1 | 2–1 | — | 0–1 | — | 1–0 | 0–1 | 0–1 | 0–3 | 0–0 | 1–1 | 4–0 |
| Čelik | 0–1 | 0–1 | 0–1 | — | 3–2 | 0–1 | 3–0 | 0–0 (Note: The match between Čelik and Jezero was not played because the home team did not appear, the official result is 0–3.) | 1–1 | 1–1 | 0–0 | 2–1 |
| Grafičar | — | 1–2 | 0–1 | — | — | — | 1–2 | — | — | 1–7 | 1–5 | 0–5 |
| Ibar | 1–1 | 3–0 | 0–1 | 3–1 | 2–1 | — | 2–1 | 1–0 | 0–0 | 1–1 | 3–0 (Note: The match was awarded to Ibar because Otrant-Olympic was fielded an ineligible player.) | 1–0 |
| Igalo | 0–0 | 2–1 | 4–0 | 0–1 | — | 0–1 | — | 2–0 | 1–5 | 0–2 | 1–3 | 1–4 |
| Jezero | 2–1 | 4–1 | 0–1 | 1–0 | 3–2 | 1–2 | 0–1 | — | 0–2 | 0–0 | 2–0 | 0–0 |
| Kom | 2–2 | 2–0 | 0–0 | 8–0 | 4–0 | 1–0 | 2–1 | 3–0 | — | 1–2 | 2–1 | 4–1 |
| Mornar | 1–1 | 4–0 | 2–0 | 2–0 | — | 0–0 | 0–1 | 0–1 | 0–4 | — | 0–1 | 1–1 |
| Otrant-Olympic | 2–0 | 1–1 | 0–2 | 1–0 | 3–1 | 1–1 | 0–0 | 1–0 | 0–0 | 1–0 | — | 2–0 |
| Radnički | 4–0 | 1–0 | 1–0 | 0–1 | 4–1 | 0–0 | 5–0 | 0–2 | 2–1 | 0–0 | 0–2 | — |

Source: Football Association of Montenegro (in Montenegrin)
Legend: Blue = home team win; Yellow = draw; Red = away team win.

=== Third round ===
| Home \ Away | BER | BRA | CET | ČEL | GRA | IBA | IGA | JEZ | KOM | MOR | OTR | RAD |
|---|---|---|---|---|---|---|---|---|---|---|---|---|
| Berane | — | 3–2 | 4–1 | — | — | — | 2–0 | 0–0 | 1–3 | — | — | — |
| Bratstvo | — | — | 1–2 | — | — | 0–1 | 0–0 | — | — | 0–1 | 1–4 | — |
| Cetinje | — | — | — | 3–0 | — | 1–2 | — | — | — | — | 0–3 | 2–2 |
| Čelik | 1–2 | 1–2 | — | — | — | — | — | 0–0 | 0–2 | — | — | 4–1 |
| Grafičar | — | — | — | — | — | — | — | — | — | — | — | — |
| Ibar | 2–1 | — | — | 3–1 | — | — | — | 1–2 | 1–0 | — | — | 2–0 |
| Igalo | — | — | 1–1 | 0–1 | — | 1–0 | — | — | — | 0–1 | 2–0 | — |
| Jezero | — | 2–0 | 1–2 | — | — | — | 1–1 | — | 1–1 | 2–2 | — | — |
| Kom | — | 5–1 | 2–0 | — | — | — | 2–0 | — | — | 2–0 | 0–2 | — |
| Mornar | 3–0 | — | — | 2–0 | — | 1–0 | — | — | — | — | 2–0 | 6–1 |
| Otrant-Olympic | 1–0 | — | — | 2–0 | — | 1–0 | — | 0–2 | — | — | — | 1–0 |
| Radnički | 0–7 | 2–4 | — | — | — | — | 0–6 | 0–4 | 2–6 | — | — | — |

Source: Football Association of Montenegro (in Montenegrin)
Legend: Blue = home team win; Yellow = draw; Red = away team win.

== Promotion play-offs ==
The runners-up and third-placed team in this season's league, Rudar Pljevlja and Petrovac respectively, will each pair off against the eighth and ninth-placed teams from the 2016–17 Montenegrin First League in the relegation play-offs, to be played over two legs. The draw was made on 29 May 2017. The two winners will play in next season's top-flight.

=== Summary ===
| Team 1 | Agg. | Team 2 | 1st leg | 2nd leg |
|---|---|---|---|---|
| Petrovac | 5–1 | Ibar | 4–0 | 1–1 |
| Otrant-Olympic | 1–3 | Rudar | 1–0 | 0–3 |

=== Matches ===
31 May 2017
17:30 CEST

| Petrovac | 4–0 | Ibar |
|---|---|---|
| Vučinić 37' (pen.); Kacić 45+3' (pen.), 61'; Pepić 64' | Report |

Stadion pod Malim brdom, Petrovac
Attendance: 400
Referee: Miloš Novović
4 June 2017
17:30 CEST

| Ibar | 1–1 | Petrovac |
|---|---|---|
| Pepić 65' | Report | Suzuki 76' |

Stadion Bandžovo Brdo, Rožaje
Attendance: 2,500
Referee: Jovan Kaluđerović

Petrovac won 5–1 on aggregate.

31 May 2017
17:30 CEST

| Otrant-Olympic | 1–0 | Rudar |
|---|---|---|
| Tachibana 14' | Report |

Stadion Olympic, Ulcinj
Attendance: 2,000
Referee: Jovan Kaluđerović
4 June 2017
17:30 CEST

| Rudar | 3–0 | Otrant-Olympic |
|---|---|---|
| Božović 31'; Melunović 53', 67' | Report |

Gradski stadion, Pljevlja
Attendance: 3,000
Referee: Miloš Novović

Rudar won 3–1 on aggregate.

== Top scorers ==
| Rank | Scorer | Club | Goals |
|---|---|---|---|
| 1 | (Montenegro) Stefan Milošević | Kom | 21 |
| 2 | (Montenegro) Miloš Đalac | Kom | 15 |
| 3 | (Montenegro) Božo Marković | Čelik | 13 |
| 4 | (Montenegro) Filip Ćipranić | Ibar | 12 |
| 4 | (Montenegro) Siniša Stanisavić | Jezero | 12 |
| 6 | (Montenegro) Halil Muharemović | Otrant-Olympic | 11 |
| 6 | (Montenegro) Božo Osmajlić | Berane | 11 |
| 8 | (Montenegro) Denis Džanović | Mornar | 10 |
| 8 | (Montenegro) Zoran Nišavić | Berane | 10 |
| 10 | (Ukraine) Yevgen Radionov | Radnički | 9 |
