= Montenegrin football league system =

The Montenegrin football league system is a series of connected leagues for club football in Montenegro. This system has hierarchical format with promotion and relegation between leagues at different levels.

== Present System ==
1	Montenegrin First League; 10 clubs		
2	Montenegrin Second League; 10 clubs		
3	Montenegrin Third League; North; 9 clubs	Montenegrin Third League; Central; 12 clubs	Montenegrin Third League; South; 7 clubs
