= 2025–26 Montenegrin Second League =

Football league season

Montenegrin Second League
- Season: 2025–26
- Dates: 18 August 2025 – 23 May 2026
- Matches: 95
- Goals: 230 (2.42 per match)
- Top goalscorer: 4 players (9 goals)
- Biggest home win: Otrant-Olympic 7–0 Internacional (16 August 2025); Rudar Pljevlja 7–0 Lovćen (8 November 2025)
- Biggest away win: Internacional 0–5 Kom (24 September 2025)
- Highest scoring: Otrant-Olympic 6–2 Rudar Pljevlja (12 October 2025); Otrant-Olympic 7–1 Podgorica (8 November 2025)
- Longest winning run: Grbalj; Otrant-Olympic; Rudar Pljevlja (3 games each)
- Longest unbeaten run: Berane (10 games)
- Longest winless run: Podgorica (9 games)
- Longest losing run: Internacional (6 games)
- All statistics correct as of 11 December 2025.

The 2025–26 Montenegrin Second League (also known as 2.CFL) was the 20th season since the establishment of the Montenegrin Second League. The season began on 18 August 2025

== Format of competition ==
A total of 10 teams participate in this edition of the Second league. The new members are Otrant-Olympic, who were relegated from the 2024–25 Montenegrin First League, and winners of the Montenegrin Third League playoffs - Berane and Internacional.

This is the 7th season that the Montenegrin Second League has 10 participants. At the end of the season the winners will get automatic promotion to the Montenegrin First League while the 2nd and 3rd placed will play in a promotion play-offs against the 9th and 8th placed teams in the Montenegrin First League, while the 9th and 10th placed teams will get relegated to the Montenegrin Third League

== Teams ==
The following 10 clubs compete this season of the second league:

Locations of the 2025-26 teams

Club	City	Finishing in 2024–25	Stadium	Floodlights
Berane	Berane	1st in Third League – North	Berane City Stadium (6,500)	Yes
Grbalj	Radanovići	6th	Stadion Donja Sutvara (1,500)	No
Igalo	Igalo	4th	Stadion Solila (1,600)	No
Internacional	Podgorica	1st in Third League – Center	Camp FSCG (1,250)	Yes
Iskra	Danilovgrad	5th	Braća Velašević Stadium (2,500)	Yes
Kom	Podgorica	8th	Stadion Zlatica (1,200)	Yes
Lovćen	Cetinje	3rd	Stadion Sveti Petar Cetinjski (5,192)	Yes
Otrant-Olympic	Ulcinj	10th in First League	Stadion Olympic (1,500)	No
Podgorica	Podgorica	7th	DG Arena (4,300)	Yes
Rudar	Pljevlja	2nd	Stadion pod Golubinjom (5,140)	Yes

== League table ==
Pos	Team	Pld	W	D	L	GF	GA	GD	Pts	Promotion, qualification or relegation
1	Otrant-Olympic (C, P)	36	23	5	8	81	31	+50	74	Promotion to the 1. CFL
2	Grbalj	36	21	4	11	63	42	+21	67	Qualification for the 1. CFL play-off
3	Iskra	36	17	13	6	51	34	+17	64	Qualification for the 1. CFL play-off
4	Berane	36	12	14	10	45	36	+9	50	
5	Kom	36	15	5	16	47	43	+4	50	
6	Lovćen	36	14	6	16	34	45	−11	48	
7	Podgorica	36	13	8	15	39	46	−7	47	
8	Rudar (O)	36	12	9	15	47	48	−1	45	Qualification for the Montenegrin Second League play-off
9	Igalo (R)	36	8	8	20	21	58	−37	32	Qualification for the Montenegrin Second League play-off
10	Internacional (R)	36	5	8	23	31	76	−45	23	Relegation to the Third League

Source: Football Association of Montenegro (in Montenegrin)
Rules for classification: 1) Points; 2) Head-to-head points; 3) Head-to-head goal difference; 4) Head-to-head goals scored; 5) Goal difference; 6) Goals scored; 7) Draw.
(C) Champions; (O) Play-off winners; (P) Promoted; (R) Relegated

=== Results ===
Home \ Away	BER	GRB	IGA	INT	ISK	KOM	LOV	OTR	POD	RUD
Berane	—	2–0	0–0	2–0	2–2	1–3	1–1	1–3	1–1	0–2
Berane	—									
Grbalj	2–1	—	2–0	3–0	3–1	4–1	2–0	1–0	3–1	1–1
Grbalj		—								2–1
Igalo	0–4	0–2	—	2–0	1–1	1–0	0–4	1–2	1–0	0–0
Igalo			—			2–1				
Internacional	0–0	1–1	1–1	—	0–3	0–5	0–1	0–1	2–0	1–2
Internacional				—						
Iskra	0–2	1–1	0–0	2–2	—	1–1	0–1	1–0	0–0	2–0
Iskra	2–2				—					
Kom	0–2	1–0	3–1	2–0	3–1	—	1–0	0–0	1–0	0–1
Kom						—				
Lovćen	0–4	0–2	0–1	2–1	1–2	0–2	—	0–3	0–1	1–0
Lovćen							—			
Otrant-Olympic	0–0	2–0	4–1	7–0	0–1	2–0	1–2	—	7–1	6–2
Otrant-Olympic				2–1				—		
Podgorica	0–0	1–0	1–0	1–1	0–1	0–0	0–1	1–3	—	2–2
Podgorica							1–0		—	
Rudar	0–0	2–1	4–0	3–2	0–1	0–3	7–0	2–1	4–0	—
Rudar										—

Updated to match(es) played on 11 December 2025. Source: Football Association of Montenegro (in Montenegrin)
Legend: Blue = home team win; Yellow = draw; Red = away team win.
For upcoming matches, an "a" indicates there is an article about the rivalry between the two participants.

== Montenegrin Second League play-off ==
The eighth and ninth-placed teams (Rudar and Igalo) each faced the third and second-placed teams of the 2025–26 Montenegrin Third League (Brskovo and Zeta) for the final two places in the 2026–27 Montenegrin Second League.

=== Summary ===
Team 1	Agg.	Team 2	1st leg	2nd leg
Igalo	1–1 (3–5 p)	Zeta	1–1	0–0
Brskovo	1–7	Rudar	1–2	0–5

=== Matches ===
29 May 2026
17:30 CEST

Igalo	1–1	Zeta
Vujović 37'	Report	Vujačić 78'

Stadion Solila, Igalo
Attendance: 30
Referee: Luka Pejović
29 May 2026
17:30 CEST

Brskovo	1–2	Rudar
Racković 47'	Report	Zečević 90+1'; Jovanović 90+7'

Gradski stadion, Mojkovac
Attendance: 350
Referee: Marko Ćupić

3 June 2026
17:30 CEST

Zeta	0–0 (a.e.t.)	Igalo
	Report
Penalties
	5–3

Stadion Trešnjica, Golubovci
Attendance: 1,500
Referee: Nikola Dabanović
3 June 2026
18:00 CEST

Rudar	5–0	Brskovo
Kečević 2'; Milić 15'; Jovanović 44'; Zečević 45+2'; Sekulić 84'	Report

Stadion pod Golubinjom, Pljevlja
Attendance: 400
Referee: Davor Božović

== Statistics ==
=== Top goalscorers ===
Rank	Player	Club	Goals
1	4 players		9
2	(Montenegro) Aleksandar Vujačić and (Serbia) Luka Sili	Otrant and Kom	8
3	(Serbia) Dejan Jovanović	Rudar	7
4	(Montenegro) Lazar Pajović	Grbalj	6

As of 11 December 2025

== See also ==
- 2025–26 Montenegrin First League
- 2025–26 Montenegrin Third League
