= Montenegrin Regional Cups =

Montenegrin football tournament

- Founded: 2006
- Region: Montenegro
- Teams: 24
- Most championships: North: Pljevlja (5); Central: Crvena Stijena (4); South: Arsenal Tivat (4)
- Website: http://www.sjevernaregija.me http://www.juznaregija.me http://www.srednjaregija.me
- 2025–26 Montenegrin Regional Cup

The Montenegrin Regional Cups (Montenegrin: Crnogorski regionalni kupovi) are the lower football competitions in which are participating members of Montenegrin Third League. There are three regional cups - Northern, Central and Southern (Montenegrin: Kup Sjeverne regije; Kup Srednje regije; Kup Južne regije). Finalists of every regional cup are qualifying for Montenegrin Cup.

== History ==
After the independence of Montenegro, Football Association of Montenegro founded Montenegrin Cup as a national cup competition. All the members of Montenegrin First League and Montenegrin Second League are directly qualifying for playing in Montenegrin Cup. Members of Montenegrin Third League are playing in Regional Cups, and six best clubs are qualifying for Montenegrin Cup's round one.

Since its establishing, Regional Cup is divided on three divisions - Northern, Southern and Central. Finalists of every division are playing in Montenegrin Cup.
Regional Cups are playing during the summer (August/September), just before the start of Montenegrin Cup season.

== Winners and finalists ==
Only teams from Third League (lower-rank in Montenegro) are playing in Regional Cups. Below is the list of winners and finalists by every single division.

=== Northern Region Cup ===
Since 2006, in the Northern Region Cup (Kup Sjeverne regije) are participating clubs from Third Montenegrin League - North. Every season, winner and runner-up of Regional Cup are qualified for Montenegrin Cup.

Season	Winner	Runner-up	Qualified for
2006	FK Komovi Andrijevica	FK Prvijenac Bijelo Polje	2006–07 Montenegrin Cup
2007	FK Pljevlja	FK Prvijenac Bijelo Polje	2007–08 Montenegrin Cup
2008	FK Pljevlja	FK Napredak Berane	2008–09 Montenegrin Cup
2009	FK Petnjica	FK Pljevlja	2009–10 Montenegrin Cup
2010	FK Petnjica	FK Polimlje Murino	2010–11 Montenegrin Cup
2011	FK Brskovo Mojkovac	FK Polimlje Murino	2011–12 Montenegrin Cup
2012	FK Pljevlja	FK Tekstilac Bijelo Polje	2012–13 Montenegrin Cup
2013	FK Tekstilac Bijelo Polje	FK Brskovo Mojkovac	2013–14 Montenegrin Cup
2014	FK Pljevlja	FK Polimlje Murino	2014–15 Montenegrin Cup
2015	FK Petnjica	FK Fair Play Bijelo Polje	2015–16 Montenegrin Cup
2016	FK Brskovo Mojkovac	FK Petnjica	2016–17 Montenegrin Cup
2017	FK Pljevlja	OFK Borac Bijelo Polje	2017–18 Montenegrin Cup
2018	FK Komovi	OFK Borac Bijelo Polje	2018–19 Montenegrin Cup
2019	FK Komovi	FK Petnjica	2019–20 Montenegrin Cup

=== Central Region Cup ===
Since 2006, in the Central Region Cup (Kup Srednje regije) are participying clubs from Third Montenegrin League - Central. Every season, winner and runner-up of Regional Cup are qualified for Montenegrin Cup.

Season	Winner	Runner-up	Qualified for
2006	FK Ribnica Podgorica	FK Iskra Danilovgrad	2006–07 Montenegrin Cup
2007	FK Ribnica Podgorica	FK Grafičar Podgorica	2007–08 Montenegrin Cup
2008	FK Zora Spuž	FK Blue Star Podgorica	2008–09 Montenegrin Cup
2009	FK Iskra Danilovgrad	FK Drezga	2009–10 Montenegrin Cup
2010	FK Crvena Stijena Podgorica	FK Gornja Zeta Golubovci	2010–11 Montenegrin Cup
2011	FK Blue Star Podgorica	FK Drezga	2011–12 Montenegrin Cup
2012	FK Kom Podgorica	FK Gorštak Kolašin	2012–13 Montenegrin Cup
2013	FK Crvena Stijena Podgorica	FK Ribnica Podgorica	2013–14 Montenegrin Cup
2014	FK Grafičar Podgorica	FK Čelik Nikšić	2014–15 Montenegrin Cup
2015	FK Zora Spuž	FK Podgorica	2015–16 Montenegrin Cup
2016	FK Podgorica	FK Gorštak Kolašin	2016-17 Montenegrin Cup
2017	FK Crvena Stijena Podgorica	FK Ribnica Podgorica	2017-18 Montenegrin Cup
2018	FK Crvena Stijena Podgorica	FK Ribnica Podgorica	2018-19 Montenegrin Cup
2019	OFK Mladost DG Podgorica	FK Gorštak Kolašin	2019-20 Montenegrin Cup

=== Southern Region Cup ===
Since 2006, in the Southern Region Cup (Kup Južne regije) are participying clubs from Third Montenegrin League - South. Every season, winner and runner-up of Regional Cup are qualified for Montenegrin Cup.

Season	Winner	Runner-up	Qualified for
2006	FK Otrant Ulcinj	FK Bijela	2006–07 Montenegrin Cup
2007	FK Mornar Bar	OFK Bar	2007–08 Montenegrin Cup
2008	FK Cetinje	FK Sloga Bar	2008–09 Montenegrin Cup
2009	FK Arsenal Tivat	FK Sloga Bar	2009–10 Montenegrin Cup
2010	FK Arsenal Tivat	FK Cetinje	2010–11 Montenegrin Cup
2011	FK Arsenal Tivat	FK Otrant Ulcinj	2011–12 Montenegrin Cup
2012	FK Sloga Radovići	FK Cetinje	2012–13 Montenegrin Cup
2013	FK Sloga Radovići	FK Hajduk Bar	2013–14 Montenegrin Cup
2014	FK Sloga Radovići	FK Hajduk Bar	2014–15 Montenegrin Cup
2015	FK Hajduk Bar	FK Sloga Bar	2015–16 Montenegrin Cup
2016	FK Hajduk Bar	FK Sloga Bar	2016–17 Montenegrin Cup
2017	FK Arsenal Tivat	FK Sloga Radovići	2017–18 Montenegrin Cup
2018	FK Hajduk Bar	FK Sloga Bar	2018–19 Montenegrin Cup
2019	FK Cetinje	FK Sloga Radovići	2019–20 Montenegrin Cup

== See also ==
- Montenegrin Cup
- Montenegrin Third League
- Football in Montenegro
- Montenegrin Republic Cup (1947-2006)
