= FK Radnički Berane =

- Full name: Fudbalski klub Radnički Berane
- Founded: 2012
- Ground: Gradski Stadion; Berane, Montenegro
- Capacity: 8,000
- President: Karmelo Marko Iritano
- Head Coach: Ivica Ćulafić
Home colours	Away colours

FK Radnički is a football club from Berane, Montenegro. The club was founded in 2012.

== History ==
Football club Radnički was founded at 2012 as a third team in the city, after FK Berane and FK Napredak. After only two seasons, FK Radnički won the trophy in the Third League - North, and after the playoffs against FK Iskra and OFK Federal, they gained historical promotion to the 2014–15 Montenegrin Second League.
FK Radnički spent three consecutive seasons in the Montenegrin Second League and played overall 93 games. In the 2016-17 season, due to lack of finances, the team finished at the bottom of the table, with relegation to the Third League.

== Honours and achievements ==
- Montenegrin Third League – 1
  - winners (1): 2013–14

== Current squad ==
Note: Flags indicate national team as defined under FIFA eligibility rules; some limited exceptions apply. Players may hold more than one non-FIFA nationality.

No.	Pos.	Nation	Player
—	GK	(Serbia) SRB	Nemanja Jevrić
—	MF	(Montenegro) MNE	Srđan Bošković (captain)
—	DF	(Montenegro) MNE	Stefan Lutovac
—	DF	(Montenegro) MNE	Nikola Tmušić
—	DF	(Montenegro) MNE	Aleksandar Raković
—	DF	(Montenegro) MNE	Vojin Jeknić
—	MF	(Montenegro) MNE	Aldin Kalač
—	MF	(Montenegro) MNE	Mladen Šoškić
—	MF	(South Korea) KOR	Kim Nam Gou

No.	Pos.	Nation	Player
—	DF	(Montenegro) MNE	Lazar Čantrić
—	MF	(Montenegro) MNE	Milovan Milović
—	MF	(Montenegro) MNE	Saša Medenica
—	MF	(Montenegro) MNE	Danilo Cvetković
—	FW	(Montenegro) MNE	Vuk Vulević
—	FW	(Montenegro) MNE	Zoran Nisavic
—	FW	(Ukraine) UKR	Evgen Radionov
—	FW	(Montenegro) MNE	Ivan Asanović

== Stadium ==
FK Radnički plays their home games on Berane City Stadium. It's the largest stadium in Northern Montenegro, with a capacity of 8,000 seats. Last renovation was finished in 2018, when stadium got the modern stand with seats, roofs, dressing rooms and offices under the UEFA standards.

== See also ==
- Berane
