= FK Bijela =

- Full name: Fudbalski klub Bijela
- Founded: 1946
- Ground: Stadion Bijela
- Capacity: 700
- League: Montenegrin Third League
- 2014–15: 5th

FK Bijela is a Montenegrin football club based in the town of Bijela, Herceg Novi municipality. During the past seasons, FK Bijela competed in the Montenegrin Third League – South Region, but currently, senior team is dissolved.

== History ==
FK Bijela was founded at 1946, under the name Bokeška pobuna, and few years later participated in the Montenegrin Republic League qualifiers as Primorac. During the seventies, the team is refounded, as a member of the Fourth League – South. They were among few sports teams in Bijela, including women basketball and water polo.

Most of their seasons, FK Bijela spent in the lower-rank competition. During the first decades, biggest result of the team were four title of regional, amateur-teams Nikša Bućin Cup (1986, 1988, 1992, 1995). Biggest success in history, FK Bijela made at the 2000–01 season, by winning the title of the Fourth League – South champion. That meant promotion to the Montenegrin Republic League, where they spent three consecutive seasons.

After Montenegrin independence, FK Bijela became a member of the Montenegrin Third League. In summer 2006, the team played in final of the Southern Region Cup, which gained them participation in the 2006–07 Montenegrin Cup. At first leg, FK Bijela hosted most-successful Montenegrin side FK Budućnost and lost 0–4. The match was attended by thousand supporters, which was the biggest attendance in the team's history.

Today, FK Bijela is not existing as a senior-team, but plays at younger-team leagues.

== Honours and achievements ==
- Montenegrin Fourth League – 1
  - winners (1): 2000–01

== Stadium ==
Stadium in Bijela was built soon after the foundation of FK Bijela. During 2000, following FK Bijela promotion to the Montenegrin Republic League, on stadium was built one stand, with capacity of 700 seats. In 2016, local authorities stated that they are planning a reconstruction of the stadium.

== See also ==
- Bijela
- Herceg Novi
- Montenegrin Third League
- Montenegrin Regional Cups
- Montenegrin clubs in Yugoslav football competitions (1946–2006)
