= Zdravko Dragićević =

Montenegrin footballer

Personal information
- Date of birth: 17 June 1986 (age 40)
- Place of birth: Podgorica, SFR Yugoslavia
- Height: 1.83 m (6 ft 0 in)
- Position: Forward

Team information
- Current team: Petrovac (manager)

Youth career
- –2003: Mogren

Senior career*
| Years | Team | Apps | (Gls) |
| 2003–2005 | Mogren | 54 | (7) |
| 2005–2006 | Obilić | 9 | (2) |
| 2006–2010 | Petrovac | 110 | (13) |
| 2010–2011 | Grbalj | 26 | (4) |
| 2011 | Persib Bandung | 1 | (0) |
| 2012 | Petrovac | 9 | (1) |
| 2012 | Balestier Khalsa | 11 | (3) |
| 2013−2014 | Petrovac | 14 | (1) |
| 2014 | Đồng Tâm Long An | 10 | (1) |
| 2015−2016 | Hoàng Anh Gia Lai | 9 | (1) |
| 2016–2019 | Grbalj | 132 | (12) |
| 2020 | FK Budva | 15 | (1) |
| Total | | 400 | (46) |

International career
| | Montenegro U21 | 1 | (0) |

Managerial career
- 2019–2023: FK Budva
- 2023: Petrovac (assistant)
- 2024–: Petrovac
- * Club domestic league appearances and goals

Zdravko Dragićević (born 17 June 1986) is a Montenegrin former footballer who played as a forward. After he finished his career, he worked as a coach.

== Career ==
Born in Montenegrin capital Podgorica, he started playing football at FK Mogren, he played for all selections of the Montenegrin national team, Dragićević played with FK Mogren, FK Obilić, OFK Petrovac, OFK Grbalj, Persib Bandung, Balestier Khalsa, Đồng Tâm Long An. And Hoàng Anh Gia Lai.
