= FK Ilarion =

Montenegrin football club

- Full name: Fudbalski klub Ilarion
- Founded: 2010; 15 years ago
- Stadium: Stadion FK Ilarion
- Chairman: Željko Vukićević
- Manager: Blagota Popović
- League: Montenegrin Third League
- 2024–25: Montenegrin Third League, 2nd of 11

FK Ilarion (Montenegrin: Cyrillic: ФК Иларион/Фудбалски клуб Иларион, Latin: Fudbalski klub Ilarion pronounced [fûdbalskiː klûːb ilarîon]) is an amateur association football club based in Zeta, Montenegro. The club was founded in 2010 and established its senior team in 2019, since then it has competed in the Montenegrin Third League — South. Ilarion plays its home matches at Stadion FK Ilarion, which has a capacity of 1,000 spectators.

== History ==
=== Early ages (2010–2019) ===
FK Ilarion was founded in 2010 as Fer-plej. Prior to 2019, the club did not have a senior team and competed only in youth categories. In 2019, a senior team was established to compete in the 2019–20 Montenegrin Third League season.

=== Montenegrin Third League (2019–present) ===
FK Ilarion made their debut as a senior team in the 2019–20 season of the Montenegrin Third League. However, in the middle of the 2019–20 season, the Montenegrin Third League was abandoned due to the COVID-19 pandemic. As a result, the Football Association of Montenegro decided that the tables would be stood as of the 17th round. Ilarion finished ninth that season with 7 points. The following season was better for Ilarion, as they finished in seventh place in the 2020–21 season of the Montenegrin Third League with 38 points. Ilarion continued to improve, finishing fifth in the 2021–22 season. One of Ilarion’s players, Vuk Lukić, was the top scorer of the Montenegrin Third League – Central region, with 30 goals. The 2022–23 season was worse for Ilarion, as they finished five places lower than the previous season, ending in tenth place with 27 points. In the 2023–24 season, Ilarion finished in fifth place with 36 points.

The 2024–25 season was by far FK Ilarion's best, as they finished in second place, which qualified them for the playoff for the title of the Montenegrin Third League – Central region alongside Zabjelo, Internacional, and Čelik. Ilarion were drawn against Zabjelo and lost 3–0 in the playoff semi-finals. As of the 2025–26 season, FK Ilarion competes in the Montenegrin Third League — Central region.

== Stadium ==
Ilarion play their home games at Stadion FK Ilarion, located in Zeta. The pitch measures 110 × 70 meters (360 feet × 230 feet) and has artificial grass. The stadium has a capacity of 1,000 spectators.

== List of seasons ==
In its existence as a senior team, FK Ilarion has played six seasons. Below is a list of all FK Ilarion seasons.

Season	League	Position	P	W	D	L	F	A	GD	Pts
2019–20	Montenegrin Third League	9	16	2	1	13	17	58	-41	7
2020–21	Montenegrin Third League	7	24	12	2	10	62	42	+20	38
2021–22	Montenegrin Third League	5	26	17	1	8	93	41	+52	52
2022–23	Montenegrin Third League	10	23	9	0	14	52	43	+9	27
2023–24	Montenegrin Third League	5	22	11	3	8	55	37	+18	36
2024–25	Montenegrin Third League	2	18	14	2	2	68	23	+45	44

== See also ==
- Montenegrin Third League
- Zeta Municipality
