= FK Obilić Herceg Novi =

- Full name: Fudbalski klub Obilić Herceg Novi
- Nickname: Vitezovi
- Founded: 2010
- Ground: Stadion u Sutorini; Herceg Novi, Montenegro
- Capacity: 150
- Chairman: Miro Lučić
- Manager: Brian Nenezić
- League: Montenegrin Third League
Home colours

FK Obilić Herceg Novi is a football club from the village Sutorina, Herceg Novi, Montenegro. They play in the Montenegrin Third League-South.

== History ==
The club was founded in 2010 under former Obilić from Zelenika, which existed since 1924 to 1941.

== Curiosity ==
In the season 2019/2020 the club had the first one not Balkan coach, Eugenio Sena (Italian), who has been part of First team staff.
