= FK Prvijenac =

FK Prvijenac is a Montenegrin football club from Bijelo Polje. The club was founded in 2000. The greatest success of his 4th place in the Montenegrin Third League (Northern region). His jerseys are orange.

The club plays at the Nedakuse stadium which has a capacity of 1000 spectators.
