= Aleksandar Mikijelj =

Montenegrin footballer

Personal information
- Full name: Aleksandar Mikijelj
- Date of birth: 5 February 1979 (age 47)
- Place of birth: Kotor, SFR Yugoslavia
- Height: 1.85 m (6 ft 1 in)
- Position: Defender

Senior career*
| Years | Team | Apps | (Gls) |
| 1996–1998 | Mogren | 21 | (6) |
| 1998–1999 | Budućnost Podgorica | 1 | (0) |
| 1999–2003 | Bokelj | 70 | (7) |
| 2003–2005 | Borac Čačak | 10 | (0) |
| 2005–2006 | Grbalj | 48 | (4) |
| 2006–2007 | Mogren | 69 | (7) |
| 2007–2008 | Bokelj | 15 | (0) |
| 2008–2012 | Petrovac | 99 | (4) |
| 2012–2015 | Bokelj | 18+ | (2+) |
- * Club domestic league appearances and goals

Aleksandar Mikijelj (Cyrillic: Александар Микијељ; born 5 February 1979) is a Montenegrin retired footballer, who finished his career with FK Bokelj.

== Club career ==
After starting his career at the most prestigious Montenegrin club FK Budućnost Podgorica, in 1999, he moved to his hometown club FK Bokelj to gain experience. In 2003, he moved to a Serbian SuperLiga club Borac Čačak. After spells in other Montenegrin clubs like FK Grbalj, FK Mogren and OFK Petrovac, since 2013 he is playing in the Montenegrin Second League club FK Bokelj.

== International career ==
In 2009, Mikijelj received calls to represent the Montenegro national football team, but did not made an appearance.
