= Bijela, Herceg Novi =

Coastal Town in Herceg Novi, Montenegro

Bijela Бијела
- Town
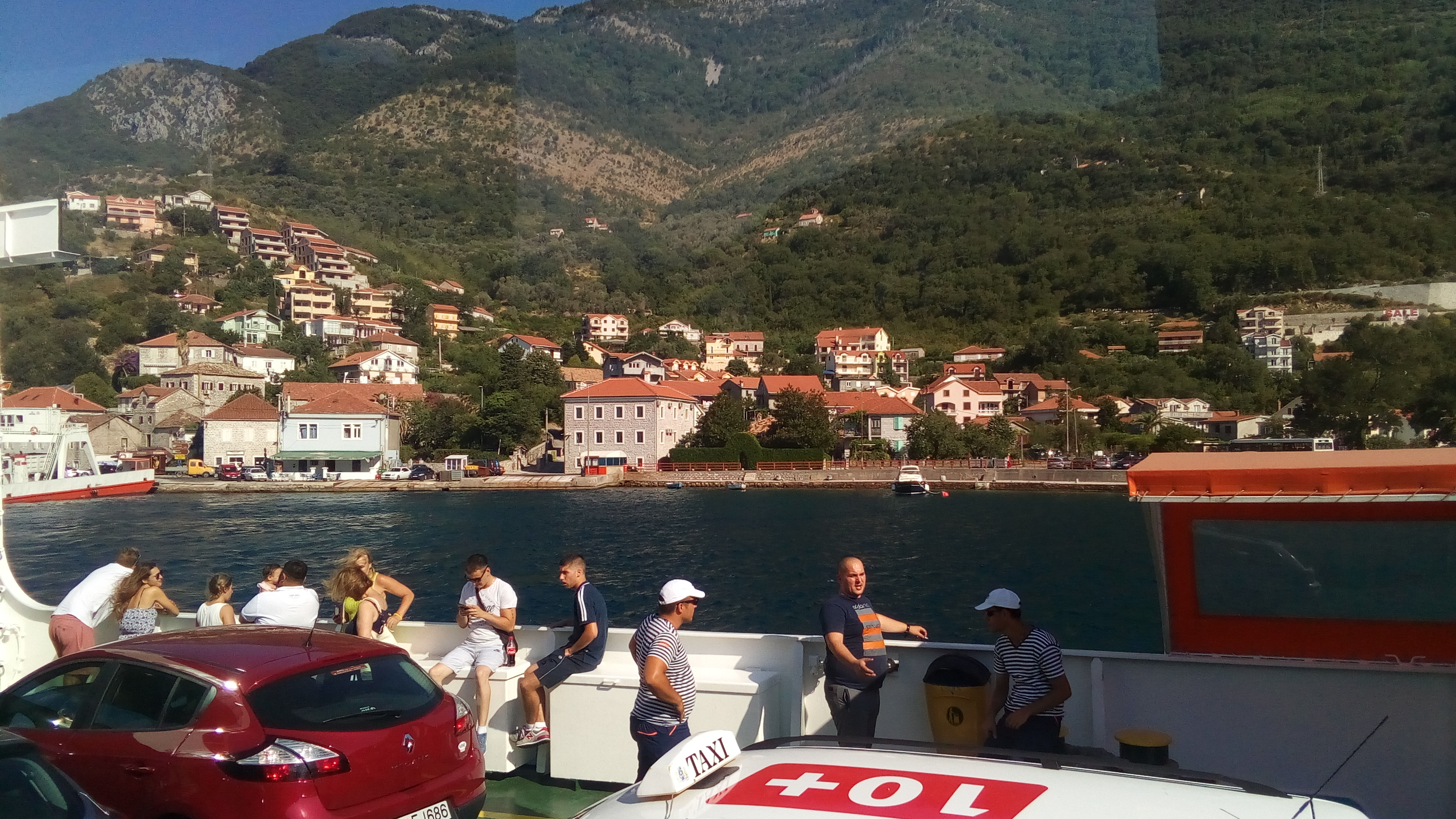

- Location within Montenegro
- Coordinates: 42°27′12″N 18°39′20″E
- Country: Montenegro
- Region: Coastal
- Municipality: Herceg Novi

Population (2011)
  - Total: 3,691
- Time zone: UTC+1 (CET)
  - Summer (DST): UTC+2 (CEST)
- Postal code: 85343
- Area code: +382 31
- Vehicle registration: HN

Bijela (Montenegrin Cyrillic: Бијела, pronounced [bîjɛlaː]) is a coastal town in the municipality of Herceg Novi, Montenegro. It is also located north of Herceg Novi, by the Verige strait in the Bay of Kotor.

The chronicler Andrija Zmajević claimed that the 16th-century Pope Sixtus V descended from a family originating in the area of Bijela. He also stated that the future Pope's father, Piergentile di Giacomo, was born in the village Bjelske Kruševice near Bijela and moved to Italy to escape the Ottoman conquest.

== Demographics ==
The population was 3,748 at the 2003 census and 3,691 at the 2011 census.

Ethnicity in 2011
| Ethnicity | Number | Percentage |
|---|---|---|
| Serbs | 1,645 | 44.6% |
| Montenegrins | 1,441 | 39.0% |
| Croats | 54 | 1.5% |
| Roma | 20 | 0.5% |
| Macedonians | 10 | 0.3% |
| Russians | 9 | 0.2% |
| Bosniaks | 8 | 0.2% |
| Slovenians | 8 | 0.2% |
| other/undeclared | 496 | 13.4% |
| Total | 3,691 | 100% |

== Bijela Adriatic Shipyard ==
Bijela was the home of the Jadransko brodogradilište Bijela, (Montenegrin: Јадранско бродоградилиште Бијела) ("Bijela Adriatic Shipyard"), the largest maintenance and repair shipyard dock in Montenegro. The remains of the bankrupt enterprise were sold off in 2020.

In December 2001 the turbo-electric car ferry Alexander the Great was towed to the shipyard in December 2001 to be converted into a cruise ship, but the project came to a halt and it was not until January 2005 that the ship was towed away.

== Sports ==
The local football club is FK Bijela, who played in Montenegro's third tier but currently only play in youth football. The club played their home games at Stadion Bijela.There is also a basketball Team Kk Bijela which competes is youth categoeries.
