= Stadion Lugovi =

Football stadium in Budva, Montenegro

Coordinates: 42.286328°N 18.850715°E

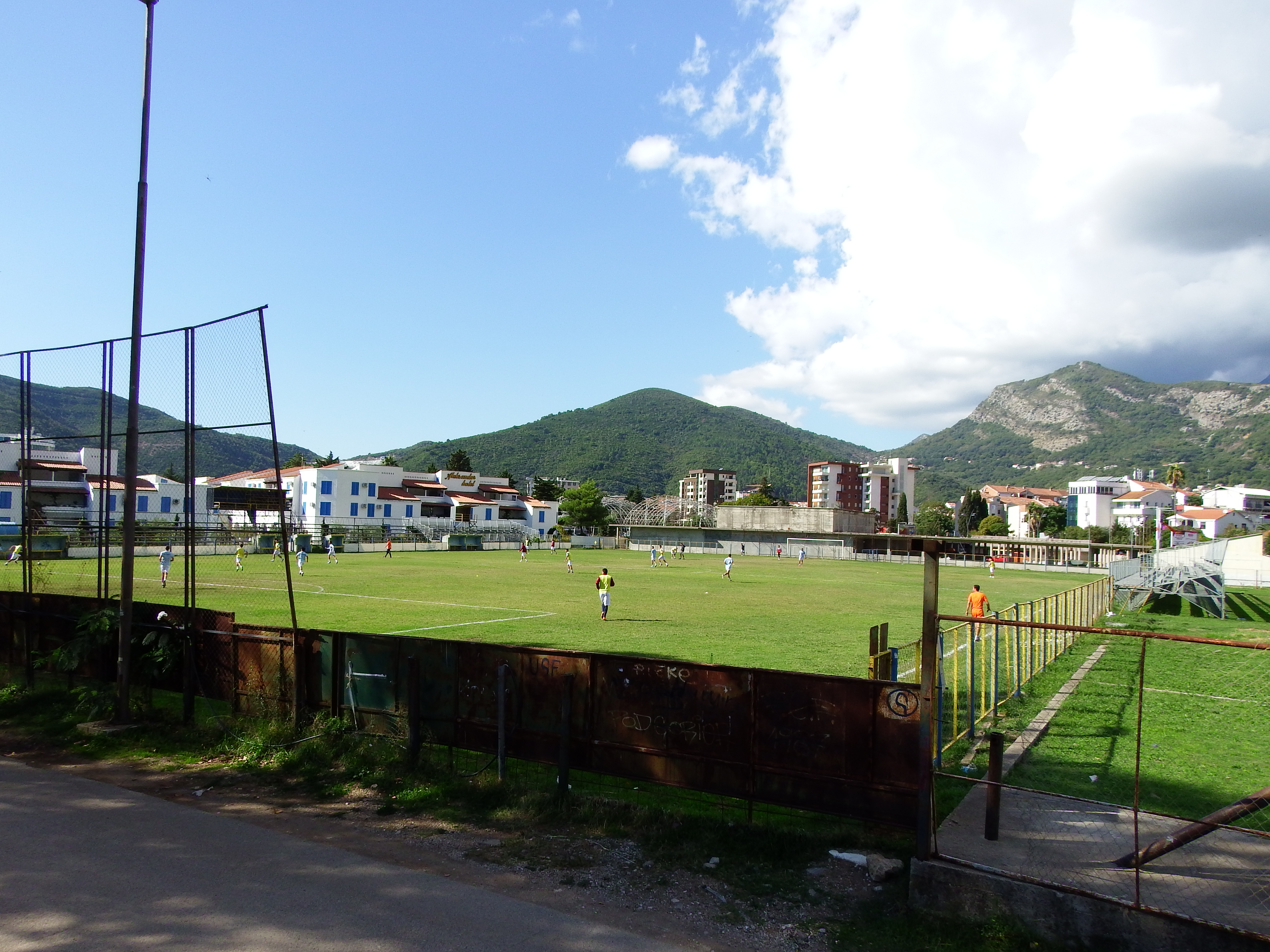
- Interactive map of Stadion Lugovi
- Full name: Stadion Lugovi
- Location: Budva, Montenegro
- Owner: Municipality of Budva
- Capacity: 1,500
- Surface: grass
- Field size: 110x70

Construction
- Built: 1960
- Renovated: 1990

Tenants
- FK Mogren, FK Budva

Stadion Lugovi is a football stadium in Budva, Montenegro. It is currently used mostly for football matches and is the home ground of FK Mogren and FK Budva. The stadium holds 1,500 people.

== History ==
The stadium was built in the 1960s and renovated at the start of the 1990s. It's situated near the main beach in Budva and it's the home ground of FK Mogren.
On the stadium exists two stands, both with capacity of 750 seats.
Plans of owner (Municipality of Budva) are to demolish the stadium, because it is in an attractive location.
In the meantime (2009-2010), city government built football pitches complex near the Jaz beach, 5 kilometers from Budva town center.

== Pitch and conditions ==
The pitch measures 110 x 70 meters. Stadium didn't met UEFA criteria for European competitions. International games at the territory of Budva municipality are playing at Stadion Pod Malim Brdom in Petrovac.

== Music concerts ==
From 2005, Stadion Lugovi hosted numerous music concerts during the summer season in Budva. Among many musicians, most attended was gig of David Guetta at July 29, 2011. Concert was attended by 6,000 spectators.

== See also ==
- FK Mogren
- Budva
- FK Budva
