= FK Sloga Radovići =

- Full name: Fudbalski klub Sloga Radovići
- Founded: 1968
- Ground: Stadion Krtoli
- Capacity: 500
- League: Montenegrin Third League
- 2015–16: 3rd

Fudbalski klub Sloga Radovići is a Montenegrin football club based in the coastal place Krtoli (Radovići) at Luštica peninsula, Municipality of Tivat. They currently compete in the Montenegrin Third League - South.

== History ==
FK Sloga was founded in 1968, as a member of the Fourth League - South inaugural season. FK Sloga was founded as a club at Luštica peninsula, with stadium in place Radovići - Krtoli.
During their complete history, FK Sloga played at the lowest-rank competition. From 1968 to 2006, the club participated in the Fourth League - South. Biggest success of that time, the club made in 1980, with the title of regional (coastal Montenegro), amateur-teams Nikša Bućin Cup winner.
After Montenegrin independence, since 2006, FK Sloga is a member of the Montenegrin Third League.
Main success in clubs' history, FK Sloga made at season 2014–15, when the team won the champions title in the Montenegrin Third League - South, failed to qualify to Second League in playoffs against Brskovo and Grafičar.
FK Sloga Radovići and Arsenal are the only football clubs in the Municipality of Tivat.

== Honours and achievements ==
- Montenegrin Third League – 1
  - winners (1): 2014–15
- Southern Region Cup – 3
  - winners (3): 2012, 2013, 2014

== Stadium ==
FK Sloga stadium is built at Krtoli village, during 1968. Except the field and club's building, there is small stand on one side, with capacity of 500 seats. Investments' company Luštica Development, a main sponsor of FK Sloga, stated they will reconstruct stadium during 2017.

== See also ==
- Tivat
- Montenegrin Third League
- Montenegrin clubs in Yugoslav football competitions (1946–2006)
