= Radovići, Tivat =

Radovići Радовићи
- Village
- Location within Montenegro
- Coordinates: 42.392944°N 18.670216°E
- Country: Montenegro
- Region: Coastal
- Municipality: Tivat

Population (2011)
  - Total: 515
- Time zone: UTC+1 (CET)
  - Summer (DST): UTC+2 (CEST)

Radovići (Montenegrin: Радовићи) is a village in the municipality of Tivat, Montenegro. It is located on the Luštica.

== Demographics ==
According to the 2011 census, it had a population of 515 people.

Ethnicity in 2011
Ethnicity	Number	Percentage
Serbs	220	42.7%
Montenegrins	125	24.3%
Croats	14	2.7%
Bosniaks	7	1.4%
other/undeclared	149	28.9%
Total	515	100%
