= FK Drezga =

- Full name: Fudbalski klub Drezga
- Founded: 1972
- Ground: Drezga Stadium, Piperi, Montenegro
- Capacity: 100
- Chairman: Milan Milutinović
- Manager: Milorad Malovrazić
- League: Third League
- 2024–25: Montenegrin Third League, 5th of 10
Home colours	Away colours

Fudbalski klub Drezga (English: Football Club Drezga) is a Montenegrin football club based in the village of Drezga in Piperi region of Podgorica. They currently compete in the Montenegrin Third League.

== History ==
FK Drezga was founded on 1972, as a team of Piperi region near Podgorica. At their first seasons, FK Drezga played in the Fourth League - Central region (lowest rank in SFR Yugoslavia). The club was dissolved at the end of the seventies.
During 1999, FK Drezga was reformed. Only two years later, Drezga won the champions title in the Fourth League - Central and gained historical promotion to the Montenegrin Republic League. They spent three consecutive seasons in the Republic League, with seventh place in the 2002-03 season as a best result.
After Montenegrin independence, FK Drezga became a member of the Montenegrin Third League. Two times, FK Drezga was a runner-up of the Central Region Cup (2009, 2011), which gave them an opportunity to participate in the Montenegrin Cup. For the first time in the 2009-10 Montenegrin Cup, FK Drezga made big surprise on first leg, winning on penalties against FK Ibar. They were eliminated in the Round of 16, against First League side OFK Petrovac (0-3; 0-4). In the 2011-12 season, FK Drezga was eliminated in the start of competition by FK Lovćen (1-3).

In the 2018-19 season, Drezga won the title in Third League - Central Region, winning promotion to the Montenegrin Second League.

== Honours and achievements ==
- Montenegrin Third League – 1
  - winners (1): 2018-19
- Montenegrin Fourth League – 1
  - winners (1): 2000-01
- Central Region Cup – 0
  - runner-up (2): 2009, 2011

== Players ==
=== Current squad ===
As of 25 October 2020

Note: Flags indicate national team as defined under FIFA eligibility rules; some limited exceptions apply. Players may hold more than one non-FIFA nationality.

No.	Pos.	Nation	Player
—	DF	MNE	Balša Bogićević
—	GK	MNE	Ognjen Bogićević
—	DF	MNE	Luka Božović
—	GK	MNE	Mladen Božović
—	MF	MNE	Goran Burzanović
—	DF	MNE	Matija Drinčić
—	DF	MNE	Simo Goranović
—	FW	MNE	Ivan Knežević
—	MF	MNE	Novak Kovačević
—		MNE	Kogoro Kubo
—	FW	MNE	Bojan Lazarević
—	FW	MNE	Aleksa Maraš
—		MNE	Milan Mirković
—		JPN	Shiden Nakazawa

No.	Pos.	Nation	Player
—	DF	MNE	Kenan Nikočević
—		MNE	Nikola Pavković
—	DF	MNE	Mihailo Petrović-Njegoš
—	FW	MNE	Deni Piranić
—	MF	MNE	Ognjen Raičković
—		MNE	Stefan Raicković
—	FW	MNE	Đorđe Saletić
—	MF	MNE	Jagoš Šćepanović
—	FW	MNE	Đorđije Spahić
—	MF	MNE	Ivan Tomašević
—	MF	MNE	Vladimir Vujisić
—	MF	MNE	Petar Vukčević
—	GK	MNE	Stojan Vukčević
—	MF	MNE	Željko Zlatičanin

== Stadium ==
FK Drezga plays their home games at Drezga Stadium. The stadium was built in 1960 and was renovated during 2000.

== See also ==
- Montenegrin Third League
- Football in Montenegro
- Montenegrin clubs in Yugoslav football competitions (1946–2006)
