= FK Orjen =

- Full name: Fudbalski klub Orjen Zelenika
- Founded: 1924
- Ground: Stadion Opačica; Herceg Novi, Montenegro
- Capacity: 650
- Chairman: Kristijan Markovic
- Manager: Milan Dakić
- League: Third League
Home colours	Away colours

FK Orjen is a Montenegrin football club based in the town of Zelenika, Herceg Novi municipality. They play in the Montenegrin Third League - South Region.

== History ==
Orjen was founded in 1924 and is named after the mountain Orjen , FK Orjen is the oldest sports society in Herceg Novi municipality. Until 1941, the team played in the Montenegrin football championship.
From 1946 to 1975, the team participated under the name FK Polet. The best results Orjen made was from 1970 to 1992, during that period, the team won three titles in the Fourth League - South (1970, 1973, 1991). At the same time, Orjen won four titles of regional Nikša Bućin Cup (1973, 1977, 1982, 1990).
FK Orjen played two years in the higher-ranked Montenegrin Republic League (third level of competition in SFR Yugoslavia), during the s1973-74 and 1991–92 seasons.

After Montenegrin independence, FK Orjen became a member of the Montenegrin Third League.

== Honours and achievements ==
- Montenegrin Fourth League – 3
  - winners (3): 1969–70, 1972–73, 1990–91

== Stadium ==
FK Orjen's stadium was built at Opačica in Zelenika hood in 1972. Apart from Orjen home games, during the winter, because of good climate and accommodation, the stadium is used for exhibition matches, tournaments, trainings and preparations of many football teams from the region (Montenegro, Serbia, Macedonia, Albania, Kosovo, Bosnia and Herzegovina and Croatia).

== See also ==
- Herceg Novi
- Montenegrin Third League
- Montenegrin Regional Cups
- Montenegrin clubs in Yugoslav football competitions (1946–2006)
