= FK Petnjica =

- Full name: Fudbalski klub Petnjica
- Founded: 1977; 49 years ago
- Ground: Gusare Stadium, Petnjica, Montenegro
- Capacity: 1,000
- League: Third League

FK Petnjica is a Montenegrin football club based in the town of Petnjica. They currently compete in the Montenegrin Third League - North Region.

== History ==
Football club Petnjica was founded on 29 June 1977, as a first sports' society in the Bihor region. During the same year, FK Petnjica became a member of the Montenegrin Fourth League - North. The club played two decades in the fourth-tier competition, but its work stopped in 1997 due to financial reasons.

In the next decade in 2006, the team was refounded under the same name. FK Petnjica became a member of the Montenegrin Third League and era of significant successes started in 2009. In the 2009–10 season, FK Petnjica won their first title of the Northern Region Cup winner, which gave them an opportunity for the first ever performance in Montenegrin Cup. In the First leg of national competition, FK Petnjica lost their game against top-tier side OFK Titograd (0–5). Next season, FK Petnjica won the title of Montenegrin Third League champion and, after the playoffs against FK Igalo (1-1, 0-0) and FK Blue Star (1–0, 1-1), gained historical promotion to the Montenegrin Second League. During the same season, FK Petnjica won another Northern Region Cup trophy, and played in the Montenegrin Cup against FK Mornar (0–2).

On their debut in the 2011-12 Second League, FK Petnjica didn't have success. The club finished in last place with 3 wins, 3 draws and 27 defeats. Most of their home games, FK Petnjica played on Berane City Stadium, due to fact that Gusare Stadium is renovated near the finish of the season.

Next seasons, FK Petnjica spent in the Third League, often among the strongest sides, but without an opportunity to make a comeback to the Second League. At the 2015–16 season, they won another Northern Region Cup, but lost against FK Bokelj (0–3) in the First leg of the Montenegrin Cup. A year later, as a finalist of the Regional Cup, FK Petnjica participated in the Montenegrin Cup again, but this time were eliminated by FK Kom (0–2) at the start of the competition.

== Honours and achievements ==
- Montenegrin Third League – 1
  - winners (1): 2010–11
- Northern Region Cup – 3
  - winners (3): 2009, 2010, 2015

== Stadium ==
FK Petnjica plays its home games at Gusare Stadium, near the main road between Petnjica and Berane. The stadium has one stand with an overall capacity of 1,000 seats.

== See also ==
- Petnjica
- Montenegrin Third League
- Montenegrin clubs in Yugoslav football competitions (1946–2006)
