= FK Partizan Bar =

- Full name: Fudbalski klub Partizan Bar
- Founded: 2009
- Ground: Stadion Topolica (small ground)
- Capacity: 1,000
- Manager: Viktor Trenevski
- League: Montenegrin Third League

Fudbalski klub Partizan Bar is a Montenegrin football club based in the town of Bar. They currently compete in the Montenegrin Third League - South.

== History ==
Club was founded at 2009 as FK Hajduk in Bar, and currently is the youngest football club in that coastal town. Since establishing, FK Hajduk is playing in the Montenegrin Third League - South.

FK Hajduk made best results in the Southern Region Cup by winning it two times. In 2016, the club were in financial trouble with club president Vasilije Milošević organising a fundraising event to keep Hajduk afloat. In August 2022. club was renamed to FK Partizan Bar.

== Honours and achievements ==
- Southern Region Cup – 2
  - winners (2): 2015, 2016

== Stadium ==
FK Hajduk plays its important home games at Stadion Topolica in Bar, whose capacity is 2,500 seats. The stadium is built at the coast of Adriatic Sea, near the city beach and Port of Bar. The stadium has floodlights, and except football, it's the main athletic field in Montenegro. For other matches, FK Hajduk is using a smaller stadium at Topolica Sports Complex, whose capacity is 1,000 seats.

== See also ==
- Bar
- Montenegrin Third League
