= FK Donje Luge =

FK Napredak
- Full name: Fudbalski klub Napredak
- Nickname(s): Luski Klub
- Ground: Gradski Stadion; Berane, Montenegro
- Capacity: 8,000
- League: Third League

FK Napredak is a Montenegrin football club based in the town of Berane. They currently compete in the Montenegrin Third League - North Region.
