= Montenegrin Third League =

- Founded: 2006
- Country: Montenegro
- Confederation: UEFA
- Number of clubs: 28 (2025–26, 3 regional leagues)
- Level on pyramid: 3
- Promotion to: Montenegrin Second League
- Domestic cup(s): Montenegrin Regional Cups, Montenegrin Cup
- Current champions: Berane, Internacional, Sloga Stari Bar
- Most championships: Pljevlja, Cetinje, Ibar (4 titles)
- Website: Centre North South
- Current: 2025–26 Montenegrin Third League

The Montenegrin Third League (Montenegrin: Treća crnogorska liga / Трећа црногорска лига) is the third and lowest-tier football league in Montenegro. It is headed by the regional unions of the Football Association of Montenegro (Union of the clubs - North, Union of the clubs - Center, Union of the clubs - South), under the Football Association of Montenegro. In the 2026–27 season, 29 teams participated divided into three regions. The top team from each region qualifies for the playoff from which the top team qualify for the Montenegrin Second League.

== Current season ==
For the 2026–27 season, Third league is divided in three geographical regions. Nine teams compete in the North, fourteen in the Center, and six in the South.

=== North ===
Third league - North 2026–27

The Third League - North is organised by Union of the clubs - North (covering municipalities of Pljevlja, Bijelo Polje, Berane, Rožaje, Plav, Petnjica, Gusinje, Mojkovac, Andrijevica, Žabljak, Šavnik and Plužine). For the 2026–27 season, there are nine teams competing in the North Region.

Team	Location	Stadium	Capacity
Akademija	Berane	Gradski	7,466
Borac	Bijelo Polje	Gradski	7,466
Brskovo	Mojkovac	Gradski	7,466
Gusinje	Gusinje	Gradski	7,466
Ibar	Rožaje	Bandžovo brdo	3,000
Komovi	Andrijevica	Prljanije	300
OFK Gusinje	Gusinje	Gradski	7,466
Petnjica	Petnjica	Gusare	1,000
Pljevlja	Pljevlja	Pod Golubinjom	5,140

=== Center ===
Third league - Center 2026–27

The Third League - Center is organised by Union of the clubs - Center (Montenegrin: Udruženje klubova - Centar - FSCG). The Central region includes the municipalities of Podgorica (capital city), Nikšić, Danilovgrad, Šavnik, Plužine, Kolašin and Tuzi.

There are 14 clubs competing in Montenegrin Third League - Center for the 2026–27 season.

Team	Location	Stadium	Capacity
Adria	Podgorica	Stari ribnjak	1,500
Crvena Stijena	Podgorica	Tološi	1,000
Čelik	Nikšić	Stadion Željezare	2,000
Drezga	Piperi	Stadion Drezge	100
Fans United	Podgorica	DG Arena	4,300
Internacional	Podgorica	Stadion Donji Kokoti	1,000
Karioke	Podgorica	Kamp FSCG	1,050
Ilarion	Golubovci	Ilarion Field	100
OFK Titograd	Ljajkovići	Kamp FSCG	1,050
Olympico	Golubovci	Trešnjica	4,000
Polet Stars	Nikšić	Sutjeska pitch	500
Ribnica	Podgorica	Kamp FSCG	1,050
Zabjelo	Podgorica	Stadion Zabjela	750
Zora	Spuž	Spuž City Stadium	1,700

=== South ===
Third league - South 2026–27

The Third League - South is organised by Union of the clubs - South (Montenegrin: Udruženje klubova - Jug - FSCG). The municipalities within Southern region include: Cetinje, Kotor, Herceg Novi, Tivat, Budva, Bar and Ulcinj.

For the 2026–27 season, there are six teams competing in the South region.

Team	Location	Stadium	Capacity
Adrenalin	Kotor	Vrmcem	425
Cetinje	Cetinje	Obilića poljana	2,000
Obilic	Sutorina	Sutorini	150
Orjen	Zelenika	Opačica	650
Sloga Bar	Bar	Topolica	2,500
Sloga Radovići	Radovići	Radovići	300

== History ==
Regional leagues as a lowest-tier competition in Montenegro, were founded in 1968. The format and system of competition has not changed. From 1968 to 2006, it was the fourth or fifth level of competition in SFR Yugoslavia, FR Yugoslavia and Serbia and Montenegro. Following Montenegrin independence (2006), regional leagues became the third tier in the organisation of domestic football competitions.
From 1968 until now, the league is divided on three regions - North (clubs from territories of Berane, Bijelo Polje, Gusinje, Mojkovac, Petnjica, Plav, Pljevlja, Rožaje and Žabljak) Center (Podgorica with Golubovci and Tuzi, Danilovgrad, Kolašin, Nikšić, Plužine and Šavnik) and South (Bar, Budva, Cetinje, Herceg Novi, Kotor, Tivat and Ulcinj).
At period 1961–2006, winners of three regional leagues were promoted to Montenegrin Republic League (3rd tier) or played Montenegrin football playoffs.

=== Champions (2006-) ===
After independence of Montenegro, regional leagues, with the same format and divisions, became Third League, and also a lowest tier of competition.
At the end of season, champions of each region qualifies for the playoff. Every season, two top teams from playoff are qualified for the Second League.
Below is the list of Montenegrin Third League champions.

Key

Promoted to 2.CFL via playoffs

Season	North	Center	South
2006–07	Tekstilac	Iskra	Otrant
2007–08	Polimlje	Ribnica	Mornar
2008–09	Gusinje	Zora	OFK Bar
2009–10	Pljevlja	Iskra	Cetinje
2010–11	Petnjica	Blue Star	Igalo
2011–12	Pljevlja	Zora	Arsenal
2012–13	Pljevlja	Kom	Cetinje
2013–14	Radnički	Iskra	Federal
2014–15	Brskovo	Grafičar	Sloga Radovići
2015–16	Polimlje	Čelik	Otrant
2016–17	Pljevlja	Podgorica	Arsenal
2017–18	Brskovo	Bratstvo	Arsenal
2018–19	Ibar	Drezga	Cetinje
2019–20	Berane	Mladost DG	Igalo
2020–21	Petnjica	Mladost DG	Cetinje
2021–22	Ibar	Nikšić	Otrant
2022–23	Ibar	Internacional	Lovćen
2023–24	Ibar	Zeta	Budva
2024–25	Berane	Internacional	Sloga Stari Bar
2024–25	Brskovo	Zeta	Budva

Full list of champions of regional leagues before 2006, is available on the page Montenegrin clubs in Yugoslav football competitions (1946-2006).

=== Complete team list ===
From 2006, 60 different teams played in Montenegrin Third League. This is the complete list of the clubs that took part in 17 seasons played from 2006–07 to 2022-23, ranked by champion titles won in the Third League.

Club	Town	Region	Ssn	First	Last	1st	2nd	3rd
Pljevlja	Pljevlja	North	17	2006–07	2022–23	4	6	2
Cetinje	Cetinje	South	12	2006–07	2023–24	4	2	1
Ibar	Rožaje	North	4	2018–19	2023–24	4	0	0
Arsenal	Tivat	South	6	2009–10	2017–18	3	3	0
Otrant	Ulcinj	South	6	2006–07	2021–22	3	1	0
Iskra	Danilovgrad	Center	5	2006–07	2013–14	3	0	1
Brskovo	Mojkovac	North	17	2006–07	2023–24	2	5	3
Zora	Spuž	Center	10	2007–08	2023–24	2	2	1
Polimlje	Murino	North	18	2006–07	2023–24	2	1	3
Petnjica	Petnjica	North	17	2006–07	2023–24	2	2	3
Igalo	Igalo	South	6	2006–07	2019–20	2	0	3
Mladost DG	Podgorica	Center	2	2019–20	2020–21	2	0	0
Drezga	Piperi	Center	14	2006–07	2023–24	1	3	0
Blue Star	Podgorica	Center	6	2006–07	2011–12	1	2	1
Sloga	Radovići	South	15	2009–10	2023–24	1	2	3
Bar	Bar	South	3	2006–07	2008–09	1	1	0
Čelik	Nikšić	Center	5	2014–15	2023–24	1	1	2
Nikšić	Nikšić	Center	4	2010–11	2021–22	1	1	0
Internacional	Podgorica	Center	2	2021–22	2022–23	1	1	0
Ribnica	Podgorica	Center	16	2006–07	2023–24	1	0	4
Tekstilac	Bijelo Polje	North	7	2006–07	2013–14	1	0	2
Gusinje	Gusinje	North	15	2008–09	2023–24	1	0	1
Grafičar	Podgorica	Center	9	2006–07	2014–15	1	0	0
Bratstvo	Cijevna	Center	5	2017–18	2021–22	1	0	0
Lovćen	Cetinje	South	3	2020–21	2022–23	1	0	0
Podgorica	Podgorica	Center	2	2015–16	2016–17	1	0	0
Radnički	Berane	North	2	2013–14	2017–18	1	0	0
Mornar	Bar	South	1	2007–08	2007–08	1	0	0
Kom	Podgorica	Center	1	2012–13	2012–13	1	0	0
Berane	Berane	North	1	2019–20	2019–20	1	0	0
Federal	Ulcinj	South	1	2013–14	2013–14	1	0	0
Zeta	Golubovci	Center	1	2023–24	2023–24	1	0	4
Partizan	Bar	South	13	2010–11	2022–23	0	4	4
Crvena Stijena	Podgorica	Center	14	2010–11	2023–24	0	4	3
Borac	Bijelo Polje	North	8	2016–17	2023–24	0	4	2
Polet	Nikšić	Center	10	2009–10	2022–23	0	2	1
Budva	Budva	South	4	2020–21	2023–24	1	2	1
Obilić	Sutorina	South	4	2012–13	2021–22	0	2	1
Orjen	Zelenika	South	8	2008–09	2023–24	0	1	2
Gorštak	Kolašin	Center	13	2006–07	2018–19	0	1	1
Akademija	Ulcinj	South	2	2022–23	2023–24	0	1	1
Zabjelo	Podgorica	Center	8	2015–16	2023–24	0	1	0
OFK Titograd	Podgorica	Center	2	2022–23	2023–24	0	1	0
Komovi	Andrijevica	North	18	2006–07	2023–24	0	0	2
Sloga	Bar	South	18	2006–07	2023–24	0	0	2
Bijela	Bijela	South	3	2006–07	2008–09	0	0	1
Adria	Podgorica	Center	5	2018–19	2022–23	0	0	1
Napredak	Berane	North	12	2006–07	2018–19	0	0	0
Prvijenac	Bijelo Polje	North	8	2006–07	2013–14	0	0	0
Fair Play	Bijelo Polje	North	6	2013–14	2018–19	0	0	0
E-Roma	Bijelo Polje	North	4	2009–10	2012–13	0	0	0
Titeks	Podgorica	Center	4	2007–08	2010–11	0	0	0
Karioke	Podgorica	Center	7	2016–17	2023–24	0	0	0
Mogren	Budva	South	2	2015–16	2016–17	0	0	0
Durmitor	Žabljak	North	2	2009–10	2010–11	0	0	0
Gornja Zeta	Zeta	Center	2	2009–10	2010–11	0	0	0
Ilarion	Zeta	Center	5	2019–20	2023–24	0	0	0
Olympico	Golubovci	Center	5	2020–21	2023–24	0	0	0
Sjeverna Zvijezda	Bijelo Polje	North	1	2015–16	2015–16	0	0	0
Spuž	Spuž	Center	2	2020–21	2021–22	0	0	0
OFK Gusinje	Gusinje	North	2	2022–23	2023–24	0	0	0
Fans United	Podgorica	Center	1	2023–24	2023–24	0	0	0
Balkan	Bar	South	1	2023–24	2023–24	0	0	0
Note: As of the end of 2023–24 season

League or status for 2022–23 season
2022–23 Montenegrin First League
2022–23 Montenegrin Second League
2022–23 Montenegrin Third League
No longer exists

Ssn = Number of seasons; First = First season in Third League; Last = Last season in Third League; 1st = finishing as a champion of region; 2nd = finishing as a runner-up; 3rd = finishing as a third-placed team

=== Final placement by season ===
==== North ====
Since its establishing, in Montenegrin Third League - North participated overall 18 different teams. Most successful participants are FK Pljevlja, who won four titles. Except that, FK Pljevlja made the biggest win in some Montenegrin official men football competition - on season 2012-13, they defeated FK E-Roma 26-1 (14-0). During the same game, FK Pljevlja player Alen Pajević scored seven goals, which was all-time record in Montenegrin Third League, until season 2022-23 when Aleksandar Krstović scored nine goals for Zora Spuž against Adria in 18–0 win.
Among the other title winners in Third League - North are FK Ibar (3), FK Brskovo (2), FK Polimlje (2), FK Petnjica (2), FK Berane (1), FK Gusinje (1), FK Tekstilac (1) and FK Radnički (1).
Two teams, FK Komovi and FK Polimlje, participated in all the seasons of Third League - North.

Club	07	08	09	10	11	12	13	14	15	16	17	18	19	20	21	22	23	24
Berane	-	-	-	-	-	-	-	-	-	-	-	-	-	1	-	-	-	-
Borac	-	-	-	-	-	-	-	-	-	-	3	2	4	2	2	5	3	2
Brskovo	7	3	6	8	2	2	2	3	1	-	2	1	3	4	6	2	5	4
Durmitor	-	-	-	7	6	-	-	-	-	-	-	-	-	-	-	-	-	-
E-Roma	-	-	-	10	10	9	10	-	-	-	-	-	-	-	-	-	-	-
Fair Play	-	-	-	-	-	-	-	11	8	8	9	8	10	-	-	-	-	-
Gusinje	-	-	1	-	3	4	4	9	7	4	5	7	8	8	5	7	8	9
OFK Gusinje	-	-	-	-	-	-	-	-	-	-	-	-	-	-	-	-	7	6
Ibar	-	-	-	-	-	-	-	-	-	-	-	-	1	-	-	1	1	1
Komovi	6	6	5	9	9	8	7	4	4	5	4	3	6	5	7	3	4	5
Napredak	8	5	8	6	5	7	8	8	5	7	8	9	9	-	-	-	-	-
Petnjica	5	4	7	2	1	-	5	5	3	3	6	5	2	3	1	8	6	7
Pljevlja	3	2	2	1	-	1	1	2	2	2	1	4	5	7	4	4	2	3
Polimlje	2	1	4	3	4	3	9	7	6	1	7	6	7	6	3	6	9	8
Prvijenac	4	7	9	5	7	5	6	10	-	-	-	-	-	-	-	-	-	-
Radnički	-	-	-	-	-	-	-	1	-	-	-	10	-	-	-	-	-	-
Sjeverna Zvijezda	-	-	-	-	-	-	-	-	-	6	-	-	-	-	-	-	-	-
Tekstilac	1	-	3	4	8	6	3	6	-	-	-	-	-	-	-	-	-	-

07 = season 2006/07

==== Center ====
Overall 25 different clubs played in Montenegrin Third League - Central region since its establishing (2006–07). Most trophies won FK Iskra with three titles. Except them, among the champions were FK Zora (2), OFK Mladost DG (2) FK Kom (1), FK Ribnica (1), FK Podgorica (1), FK Grafičar (1), FK Bratstvo (1), FK Drezga (1), FK Internacional (1) and FK Blue Star (1).
Owner of the biggest wins in the history of Montenegrin Third League - Center is FK Zeta, who defeated FK Njegoš away with result 0-27 (season 2024-25). Player with most scored goals on one game is Miloš Krkotić (11 goals) who made a record on that game.

Club	07	08	09	10	11	12	13	14	15	16	17	18	19	20	21	22	23	24
Adria	-	-	-	-	-	-	-	-	-	-	-	-	3	5	7	10	12	-
Blue Star	4	2	2	3	1	4	-	-	-	-	-	-	-	-	-	-	-	-
Bratstvo	-	-	-	-	-	-	-	-	-	-	-	1	7	7	8	13	-	-
Crvena Stijena	-	-	-	-	5	3	5	2	2	7	5	2	4	6	3	3	2	7
Čelik	-	-	-	-	-	-	-	-	2	1	-	-	10	-	-	-	3	3
Drezga	2	3	4	5	2	2	6	4	-	-	6	4	1	-	-	9	9	8
Fans United	-	-	-	-	-	-	-	-	-	-	-	-	-	-	-	-	-	6
Gornja Zeta	-	-	-	7	8	-	-	-	-	-	-	-	-	-	-	-	-	-
Gorštak	5	7	6	6	9	7	4	5	5	3	2	5	9	-	-	-	-	-
Grafičar	6	6	7	8	7	8	7	6	1	-	-	-	-	-	-	-	-	-
Ilarion	-	-	-	-	-	-	-	-	-	-	-	-	-	8	5	5	10	5
Internacional	-	-	-	-	-	-	-	-	-	-	-	-	-	-	-	2	1	-
Iskra	1	4	3	1	-	-	-	1	-	-	-	-	-	-	-	-	-	-
Karioke	-	-	-	-	-	-	-	-	-	-	6	-	6	4	10	8	11	10
Kom	-	-	-	-	-	-	1	-	-	-	-	-	-	-	-	-	-	-
Mladost DG	-	-	-	-	-	-	-	-	-	-	-	-	-	1	1	-	-	-
Podgorica	-	-	-	-	-	-	-	-	-	5	1	-	-	-	-	-	-	-
Nikšić	-	-	-	-	6	9	-	-	-	-	-	-	-	-	2	1	-	-
Olympico	-	-	-	-	-	-	-	-	-	-	-	-	-	-	12	11	13	12
Polet	-	-	-	9	10	5	2	7	-	-	-	-	2	3	6	6	7	-
Ribnica	3	1	-	4	4	6	3	3	-	6	4	3	8	9	11	12	8	11
Spuž	-	-	-	-	-	-	-	-	-	-	-	-	-	-	9	14	-	-
Titeks	-	8	5	10	11	-	-	-	-	-	-	-	-	-	-	-	-	-
OFK Titograd	-	-	-	-	-	-	-	-	-	-	-	-	-	-	-	-	6	2
Zabjelo	-	-	-	-	-	-	-	-	-	4	3	-	5	2	4	4	4	4
Zeta	-	-	-	-	-	-	-	-	-	-	-	-	-	-	-	-	-	1
Zora	-	5	1	2	3	1	-	-	4	2	-	-	-	-	-	7	5	9

07 = season 2006/07

==== South ====
Since establishing, 17 different teams played in Montenegrin Third League - South region. Among them, most successes have FK Cetinje with four titles and FK Arsenal with three. Except them, winners of competition were also FK Otrant (2), FK Igalo (2), FK Mornar (1), FK Lovćen (1) OFK Bar (1), OFK Federal (1) and FK Sloga Radovići (1).
Since 2006, biggest win in Montenegrin Third League - South made FK Cetinje, who defeated FK Bijela with score 12-0 on season 2007-08.
FK Sloga Bar is the only team which played every single season of Montenegrin Third League - South Region.

Club	07	08	09	10	11	12	13	14	15	16	17	18	19	20	21	22	23	24
Akademija	-	-	-	-	-	-	-	-	-	-	-	-	-	-	-	-	3	2
Arsenal	-	-	-	2	2	1	-	-	-	2	1	1	-	-	-	-	-	-
Balkan	-	-	-	-	-	-	-	-	-	-	-	-	-	-	-	-	-	7
Bar	6	2	1	-	-	-	-	-	-	-	-	-	-	-	-	-	-	-
Bijela	5	4	6	-	-	-	-	-	-	-	-	-	-	-	-	-	-	-
Budva	-	-	-	-	-	-	-	-	-	-	-	-	-	-	3	2	2	1
Cetinje	2	5	2	1	5	3	1	-	-	-	-	-	1	4	1	-	8	6
Federal	-	-	-	-	-	-	-	1	-	-	-	-	-	-	-	-	-	-
Partizan	-	-	-	-	4	5	2	2	2	3	2	3	3	3	6	5	4	-
Igalo	3	3	4	3	1	-	-	-	-	-	-	-	-	1	-	-	-	-
Lovćen	-	-	-	-	-	-	-	-	-	-	-	-	-	-	8	4	1	-
Mogren	-	-	-	-	-	-	-	-	-	6	5	-	-	-	-	-	-	-
Mornar	-	1	-	-	-	-	-	-	-	-	-	-	-	-	-	-	-	-
Obilić	-	-	-	-	-	-	2	-	-	-	-	-	-	2	5	3	-	-
Orjen	-	-	3	-	-	-	-	4	3	-	-	-	-	6	2	6	5	4
Otrant	1	-	-	-	-	2	4	-	-	1	-	-	-	-	4	1	-	-
Sloga Bar	4	6	5	5	6	6	5	5	4	5	3	4	4	7	9	8	6	3
Sloga R	-	-	-	4	3	4	3	3	1	4	4	2	2	5	7	7	7	5

07 = season 2006/07

=== Promotion playoffs ===
Following the Montenegrin independence, from the season 2006/07, champions of three regional leagues are participating in the playoffs for Montenegrin Second League promotion. Until 2020, every team is played four matches, and at the end, best-placed are promoted to a higher rank. From 2020, every team is playing two games, and if there is no winner after 90 minutes, penalties are deciding about it. Two teams are gaining promotion to the Second League.
Playoffs are playing after the regular season, at the end of May and start of June every year.

==== Promotions by season ====
Until now, most promotions to Montenegrin Second League through playoffs gained FK Iskra (2), FK Arsenal (2), FK Otrant (2) and FK Igalo (2).

†	Promoted to Montenegrin Second League.

Season	1st	2nd	3rd	Results
2007	FK Otrant	FK Tekstilac	FK Iskra	OTR - TEK 2-1, 1-2; OTR - ISK 6-0, 2-0; TEK - ISK 2-0, 2-0
2008	FK Mornar	FK Ribnica	FK Polimlje	MOR - RIB 1-0, 2-1; MOR - POL 3-2, 2-2; RIB - POL 2-2, 2-0
2009	OFK Bar	FK Gusinje	FK Zora	BAR - GUS 3-0, 3-3; BAR - ZOR 3-2, 4-1; GUS - ZOR 1-0, 2-2
2010	FK Pljevlja	FK Iskra	FK Cetinje	PLJ - ISK 0-0, 0-0; PLJ - CET 0-0, 2-1; ISK - CET 1-1, 0-0
2011	FK Igalo	FK Petnjica	FK Blue Star	IGA - PET 0-0, 1-1; IGA - BLU 3-0, 2-1; PET - BLU 1-0, 1-1
2012	FK Arsenal	FK Zora	FK Pljevlja	ARS - PLJ 3-2, 3-0; ARS - ZOR 1-0, 0-2; ZOR - PLJ 3-0, 0-2
2013	FK Kom	FK Cetinje	FK Pljevlja	KOM - CET 3-0, 1-0; KOM - PLJ 0-1, 1-2; CET - PLJ 3-1, 2-1
2014	FK Radnički	FK Iskra	OFK Federal	RAD - ISK 2-1, 1-2; RAD - FED 2-0, 1-0; ISK - FED 2-0, 0-1
2015	FK Brskovo	FK Grafičar	FK Sloga R	BRS - GRA 2-0, 1-2; BRS - SLO 7-1, 0-0; GRA - SLO 2-0, 0-1
2016	FK Čelik	FK Otrant	FK Polimlje	ČEL - OTR 3-0, 0-1; ČEL - POL 7-0, 2-0; OTR - POL 2-2, 3-2
2017	FK Podgorica	FK Arsenal	FK Pljevlja	POD - ARS 1-2, 2-1; POD - PLJ 4-0, 1-3; ARS - PLJ 1-0, 0-1
2018	FK Arsenal	FK Brskovo	FK Bratstvo	ARS - BRS 1-0, 1-1; ARS - BRA 1-1, 2-0; BRS - BRA 1-0, 3-4
2019	FK Ibar	FK Drezga	FK Cetinje	CET - IBA 1-0, 1-3; DRE - CET 0-0, 0-0; IBA - DRE 2-0, 1-4
2020	FK Igalo	FK Berane	OFK Mladost DG	MLA - BER 0-0 (3-4); IGA - MLA 2-0; BER - IGA 1-2
2021	OFK Mladost DG	FK Cetinje	FK Petnjica	PET - MLA 0-2; MLA - CET 6-0; CET - PET 2-0
2022	OFK Nikšić	FK Otrant	FK Ibar	OTR - IBA 2-0; IBA - NIK 0-3; NIK - OTR 3-1
2023	FK Lovćen	FK Internacional	FK Ibar	INT - IBA 4-1; IBA - LOV 0-4; LOV - INT 2-1

==== Promotions by region ====
During the history, most promotions to Montenegrin Second League gained teams from Central and South region. Representatives of that regions gained promotions via playoffs 12 times. Clubs from North region gained 8 promotions through playoffs.

Third League region	Promotions
North	8
Center	12
South	12

== See also ==
- Montenegrin Regional Cups
- Football in Montenegro
- Montenegrin clubs in Yugoslav football competitions (1946-2006)
