= FK Pljevlja 1997 =

- Full name: Fudbalski klub Pljevlja 1997
- Founded: 1997; 29 years ago
- Ground: Stadion Gradski, Pljevlja, Montenegro
- Capacity: 5,140
- League: Montenegrin Third League – North
Home colours	Away colours

FK Pljevlja is a Montenegrin football club based in the town of Pljevlja. They currently compete in Montenegrin Third League – North Region.

== Stadium ==
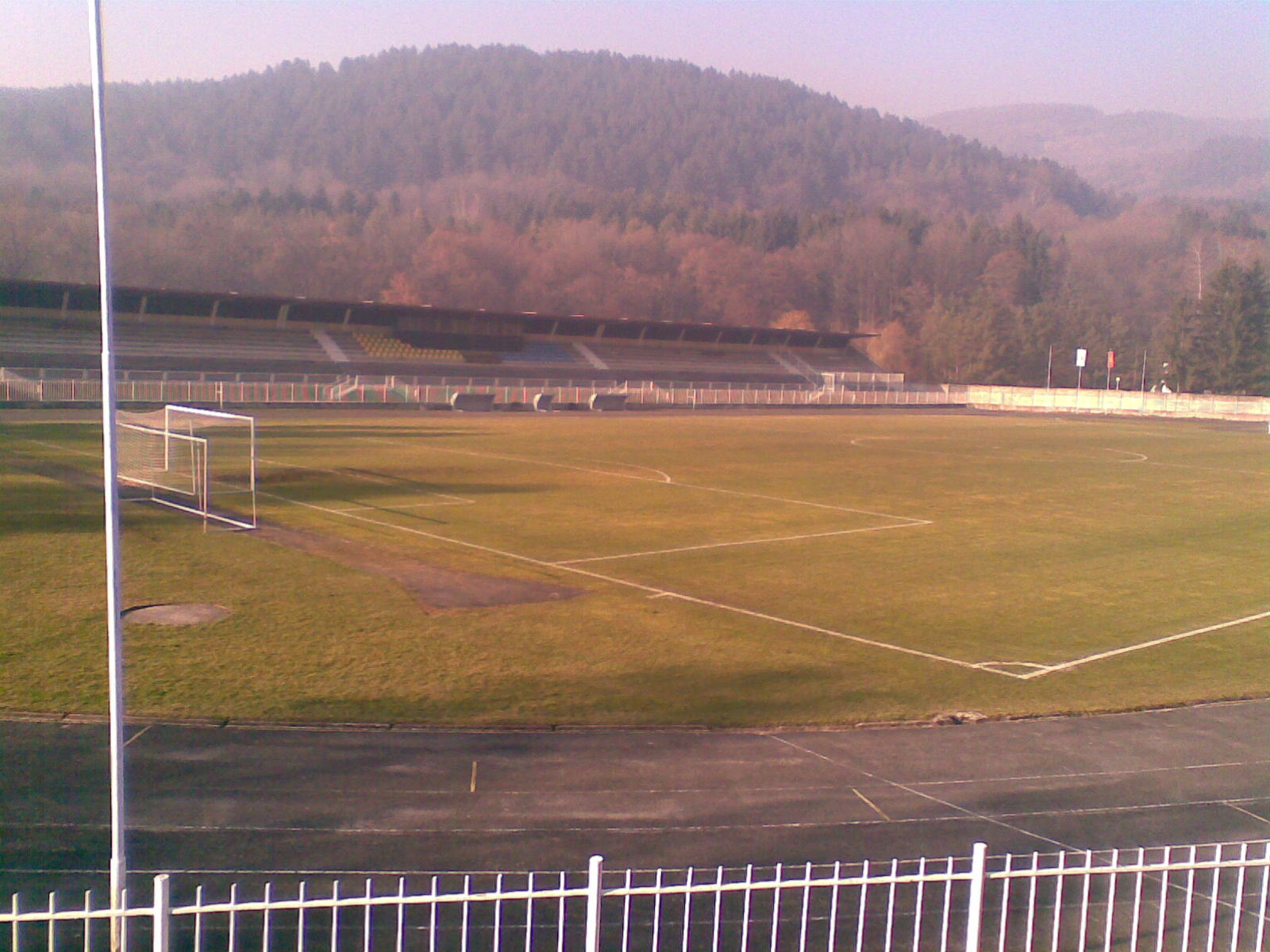
The Gradski stadion.

The club plays it’s games in the Gradski stadion which has a capacity of 5,140 seats. The stadium was built in 1972. In May of 2020, floodlight was added to the stadium, which was financed by the Football Association of Montenegro.

== History ==
Pljevlja were close to promotion to the Second League in the 2011–12 season, but their first two matches were annulled due to Milivoje Mrdak's ineligible appearance. In the 2012–13 season, Pljevlja had the same number of points as Kom and Cetinje in the play-offs for the Second League, but they had the worst goal difference and failed to advance to the Second League. After a three-year break, in the 2016–17 season, they won the title of champion of the Northern Region, while in the play-offs for the Second League for the 2017–18 season. they finished with the same number of points as Mladost Lješkopolje and Arsenal, but once again had the worst goal difference and failed to advance to the Second League. During the 2016–17 season, Pljevlja threatened to withdraw from the league, due to what they said were irregular conditions directed against them.
