= FK Internacional =

Montenegrin football club

- Full name: Fudbalski klub Internacional
- Founded: 20 July 2021; 4 years ago
- Ground: Stadion Donji Kokoti; Podgorica, Montenegro
- Capacity: 1,000
- Chairman: Velibor Vuković
- Manager: Vladimir Savićević
- League: Montenegrin Second League
- 2024–25: Montenegrin Third League, 1st (Promoted) via Playoff
- Website: https://fkinternacional.me/
Home colours	Away colours

FK Internacional is a Montenegrin football club based in suburb of Podgorica named Donji Kokoti. Founded in 2021, they currently compete in the Montenegrin Second League.

The club was founded on 20 July 2021 and in the 2022–23 season won the title of the Center group of Montenegrin Third League and promoted to the Montenegrin Second League via play-offs.

== Honours and achievements ==
- Montenegrin Third League – 2
  - Winners (2): 2022–23, 2024-25

== Players ==
=== Current squad ===
As of 20 May 2024

Note: Flags indicate national team as defined under FIFA eligibility rules; some limited exceptions apply. Players may hold more than one non-FIFA nationality.

No.	Pos.	Nation	Player
—	MF	MNE	Adil Adžović
—	FW	MNE	Balša Bulatović
—	GK	MNE	Marjo Camović
—	FW	MNE	Aleksandar Ćulafić
—	MF	MNE	Miloš Dragaš
—	MF	MNE	Jovan Đukić
—		MNE	Bojan Janjušević
—	DF	SRB	Matija Košanin
—	DF	MNE	Zarija Kumburović
—	FW	MNE	Jovan Mališić
—	FW	MNE	Amar Methadžović
—	MF	MNE	Đorďe Mujović (captain)
—	DF	MNE	Marko Mujović
—	FW	JPN	Ryo Omori

No.	Pos.	Nation	Player
—	MF	MNE	Miloš Popović
—	MF	MNE	Nemanja Popović
—	FW	MNE	Nikola Radenović
—	DF	MNE	Miloš Radulović
—	FW	MNE	Lazar Rakočević
—	DF	MNE	Luka Smolović
—	MF	MNE	Tomo Šoć
—	MF	MNE	Lazar Stijepović
—	MF	MNE	Vedad Turusković
—	MF	MNE	Aleksa Vlahović
—	GK	MNE	Milovan Vujisić
—	MF	MNE	Danilo Vukanić
—	DF	JPN	Haruki Yamamura
—	MF	JPN	Takumi Yanagizawa

== See also ==
- Montenegrin Second League
- Football in Montenegro
