= FK Sloga Stari Bar =

- Full name: Fudbalski klub Sloga Stari Bar
- Founded: 1923
- Ground: Stadion Topolica (small ground)
- Capacity: 1,000
- Chairman: Milo Novaković
- League: Montenegrin Third League
- 2024–25: Montenegrin Third League 1st of 7

Fudbalski klub Sloga Stari Bar is a Montenegrin football club based in the town of Stari Bar, near Bar. They currently compete in the Montenegrin Third League – South.

== History ==
FK Sloga was founded in 1926, as FK Orao (Eagle), in Stari Bar (the Old town of Bar).
In the first decades (1926–1941), FK Orao played mostly exhibition matches, with the popular local rivalry with FK Mornar (at that time named as JSK Crnojević), with a few seasons in the Montenegrin Football Championship (1922-1940).

From 1946 until now, under the new name – Sloga, the club played only in the lowest-rank competition. In the period between1961-1968, FK Sloga played in the Fourth League – South. In 1968, the club was dissolved, but it was refounded in 1984. After that, FK Sloga continued to play in the Fourth League.

Since 2006, Sloga is a member of the Montenegrin Third League. As a finalist of the Southern Region Cup, FK Sloga played in the Montenegrin Cup seasons 2008–09, 2009–10, 2015–16 and 2016–17.

In August 2022 Boris Djurasic became the new chairman of the club. During the 22–23 season all of the league as well as friendly matches were televised on Jadran TV. The board hired a former international player and fan favorite Igor Burzanović as the head coach.

In the 2024–25 season Sloga won the Montenegrin Third League South which earned them a chance for a spot in the 2025–26 Montenegrin Second League. But they failed to get one after a defeat against Kom

== Stadium ==
Because there is no football pitch in Stari Bar, FK Sloga plays its important home games at Stadion Topolica in Bar, whose capacity is 2,500 seats. The stadium is built at the coast of Adriatic Sea, near the city beach and Port of Bar. The stadium has floodlights, and except football, it's the main athletic field in Montenegro. For other matches, FK Sloga is using the smaller stadium at the Topolica Sports Complex, whose capacity is 1,000 seats.

== Honours ==
- Montenegrin Third League – South – 1
  - Winners (1): 2024–25

== See also ==
- Stadion Topolica
- Bar
- Montenegrin Third League
- Montenegrin clubs in Yugoslav football competitions (1946–2006)
