= FK Cetinje =

Montenegrin football club based in Cetinje

- Full name: Fudbalski klub Cetinje
- Founded: 1975; 51 years ago
- Ground: Sveti Petar Cetinjski; Cetinje, Montenegro
- Capacity: 5,192
- Chairman: Igor Raičević
- Manager: Dušan Vlaisavljević
- League: Third League South
- 2024–25: Montenegrin Third League, 7th of 7
Home colours	Away colours

FK Cetinje is a Montenegrin football club based in Cetinje. They currently compete in the Montenegrin Third League.

== History ==
Founded in 1975, Football club Cetinje started as a team of printing house Obod. The first name of the club was FK Štampar. From 1978, the team participated under the name FK Tara, and since 1991 its name changed to FK Cetinje. The club comes from a town with a strong football tradition, and their neighbouring FK Lovćen is the oldest Montenegrin sports club and member of the Montenegrin First League.
The first significant success the team made was in the 1980–81 season, when they won the title in the Fourth League - Southern region, gaining promotion to the Montenegrin Republic League.
During the eighties and nineties, FK Cetinje spent many seasons in the third and fourth rank of the Yugoslav football pyramid, but always in the shadow of the oldest city rival - FK Lovćen.
Following Montenegrin independence, FK Cetinje became a member of the Montenegrin Third League, where they spent three consecutive seasons. In the 2009–10 season, they won the title in Third League - Southern Region, but with losses against FK Iskra and FK Pljevlja in the promotion playoffs, they failed to qualify for the Montenegrin Second League.
Historical success came in the 2012–13 season when FK Cetinje won another title in the Third League, but this time they won the promotion playoffs against FK Pljevlja and FK Kom. With that result, FK Cetinje gained promotion for the first time to the Montenegrin Second League. In the first game in the Second League, they played against FK Igalo (1:0).
After two seasons spent in the second-tier, FK Cetinje made notable success during the 2015–16 season. After autumn half-season, they finished as the leader of the Second League, but during the spring FK Cetinje lost a first-place struggle against FK Jedinstvo and finished second. With that result, FK Cetinje qualified for their first performance in the Montenegrin First League playoffs, where they met OFK Petrovac. After a goalless draw in Cetinje, OFK Petrovac won second game (1–0), so FK Cetinje remained a member of the Second League.
After five consecutive seasons in Second League, FK Cetinje was relegated to the bottom-tier in 2018. But, after three seasons spent in Third League - South, they made returned to the Montenegrin Second League on the 2021–22 season.

== Honours and achievements ==
- Montenegrin Second League – 0
  - runner-up (1): 2015–16
- Montenegrin Third League – 3
  - winners (2): 2009–10, 2012–13, 2020–21
- Montenegrin Fourth League – 5
  - winners (5): 1980–81, 1988–89, 1993–94, 1997–98, 2003–04
- Southern Region Cup – 1
  - winners (1): 2008
  - runner-up (2): 2010, 2012

== Players ==
=== Current squad ===
Note: Flags indicate national team as defined under FIFA eligibility rules; some limited exceptions apply. Players may hold more than one non-FIFA nationality.

No.	Pos.	Nation	Player
1	GK	MNE	Veljko Bajković
3	DF	SRB	Aleksandar Colić
8	DF	MNE	Milo Ćetković
45	MF	MNE	Edin Nikočević
5	DF	MNE	Miodrag Stanojevic
20	FW	MNE	Branko Martinović
10	MF	MNE	Andrija Mirković
—	MF	MNE	Balša Bogićević
—	MF	MNE	Igor Marković

No.	Pos.	Nation	Player
12	GK	MNE	Veljko Bajković
14	FW	MNE	Marko Strugar
--	MF	MNE	Aldin Šabotić
22	FW	MNE	Đorđe Mujović
16	DF	MNE	Nikola Mijanović
13	MF	MNE	Luka Ćeranić
7	MF	MNE	Ilija Radunović
—	DF	MNE	Marko Roganović
—	FW	KOS	Arbër Sahiti
—	MF	MNE	Ivan Batrićević
—	MF	MNE	Malic Mucevic (on loan from FK Mornar)

=== Notable players ===
For the list of former players with Wikipedia article, please see Category:FK Cetinje players.

== Stadium ==
FK Cetinje play their home games in Stadion Sveti Petar Cetinjski. They share the stadium with local rival FK Lovćen. The stadium has a capacity of 5,192 spectators.

== See also ==
- Montenegrin Third League
- Football in Montenegro
- Montenegrin clubs in Yugoslav football competitions (1946–2006)
- Cetinje
- FK Lovćen
