= List of pre-independence Montenegrin football league winners =

Before the independence of Montenegro, football clubs from that country played in different competitions. From 1945 to 2006, Montenegrin club played in the leagues of SFR Yugoslavia, FR Yugoslavia and Federation of Serbia and Montenegro.

Upon the independence referendum, Montenegrin Football Association established their own competitions, with the Montenegrin First League as a top tier.

== History ==
As a part of the football system in SFR Yugoslavia, FR Yugoslavia and Serbia and Montenegro, Montenegrin clubs played in different leagues. Below is the table with chronology of competition system and leagues in which played Montenegrin teams during the each period from 1945 to 2006.

Country	Period	Tiers
SFR Yugoslavia	1946	Montenegrin Republic League (I)
SFR Yugoslavia	1946-1947	Yugoslav First League (I)
SFR Yugoslavia	1946-1947	Montenegrin Republic League (II)
SFR Yugoslavia	1947-1949	Yugoslav First League (I)
SFR Yugoslavia	1947-1949	Yugoslav Second League (II)
SFR Yugoslavia	1947-1949	Montenegrin Republic League (III)
SFR Yugoslavia	1950	Yugoslav First League (I)
SFR Yugoslavia	1950	Yugoslav Second League (II)
SFR Yugoslavia	1950	Yugoslav Third League (III)
SFR Yugoslavia	1950	Montenegrin Republic League (IV)
SFR Yugoslavia	1951-1968	Yugoslav First League (I)
SFR Yugoslavia	1951-1968	Yugoslav Second League (II)
SFR Yugoslavia	1951-1968	Montenegrin Republic League (III)
SFR Yugoslavia	1969-1988	Yugoslav First League (I)
SFR Yugoslavia	1969-1988	Yugoslav Second League (II)
SFR Yugoslavia	1969-1988	Montenegrin Republic League (III)
SFR Yugoslavia	1969-1988	Montenegrin regional league system (IV)
SFR Yugoslavia	1988-1992	Yugoslav First League (I)
SFR Yugoslavia	1988-1992	Yugoslav Second League (II)
SFR Yugoslavia	1988-1992	Yugoslav Third League (III)
SFR Yugoslavia	1988-1992	Montenegrin Republic League (IV)
SFR Yugoslavia	1988-1992	Montenegrin regional league system (V)
FR Yugoslavia	1992-2001	First League of FR Yugoslavia (I)
FR Yugoslavia	1992-2001	Second League of FR Yugoslavia (II)
FR Yugoslavia	1992-2001	Montenegrin Republic League (III)
FR Yugoslavia	1992-2001	Montenegrin regional league system (IV)
Serbia and Montenegro	2001-2006	First League of Serbia and Montenegro (I)
Serbia and Montenegro	2001-2006	Second League of Serbia and Montenegro (II)
Serbia and Montenegro	2001-2006	Montenegrin Republic League (III)
Serbia and Montenegro	2001-2006	Montenegrin regional league system (IV)

== Montenegrin clubs in Yugoslav First League ==
=== Participants and seasons (1946-1992) ===
During the existence of SFR Yugoslavia, Montenegrin clubs which participated in the First League were FK Budućnost and FK Sutjeska. Budućnost was among the clubs which participated in the first season of Yugoslav First League (1946-47).

Club	Seasons	First season	Last season	Matches	W	D	L	GD
FK Budućnost	26	1946-47	1991-92	789	261	188	335	889:1114
FK Sutjeska	9	1964-65	1991-92	295	90	65	135	346:454

=== Participants and seasons (1992-2006) ===
Due to fact that in new state union of FR Yugoslavia (later Serbia and Montenegro) were two republics, Montenegrin clubs find easier way to qualify for the First League. Among the clubs which played one or more seasons in the First League of FR Yugoslavia and, later, Serbia and Montenegro, were FK Budućnost, FK Sutjeska, FK Rudar, FK Mogren, FK Zeta, FK Kom and FK Jedinstvo.

Club	Seasons	First season	Last season	Matches	W	D	L	GD
FK Budućnost	11	1992-93	2005-06	368	125	78	165	385:512
FK Sutjeska	11	1992-93	2004-05	310	107	59	144	353:474
FK Zeta	6	2000-01	2005-06	192	83	38	71	269:250
FK Mogren	5	1992-93	2002-03	170	44	35	91	171:289
FK Rudar	6	1993-94	2002-03	140	39	33	68	129:187
FK Kom	1	2003-04	2003-04	30	4	2	24	21:67
FK Jedinstvo	1	2005-06	2005-06	30	3	2	25	18:72

== Republic League of Montenegro (3rd tier) ==
- 1945 - FK Budućnost
- 1946 -
- 1947 -
- 1948 -
- 1949 -
- 1950 -
- 1951 -
- 1952 -
- 1952/53 -
- 1953/54 -
- 1954/55 -
- 1955/56 -
- 1956/57 -
- 1957/58 -
- 1958/59 -
- 1959/60 - FK Lovćen
- 1960/61 -
- 1961/62 -
- 1962/63 - FK Lovćen
- 1963/64 - FK Sutjeska
- 1964/65 - FK Lovćen
- 1965/66
- 1966/67
- 1967/68 -
- 1968/69 -
- 1969/70 -
- 1970/71 -
- 1971/72 -
- 1972/73 -
- 1973/74 -
- 1974/75 -
- 1975/76 -
- 1976/77 -
- 1977/78 -
- 1978/79 -
- 1979/80 - FK Lovćen
- 1980/81 -
- 1981/82 - FK Lovćen
- 1982/83 -
- 1984/85 - FK Lovćen
- 1985/86 -
- 1986/87 -
- 1987/88 -
- 1988/89 -
- 1989/90 - FK Lovćen
- 1990/91 -
- 1991/92 -
- 1992/93 - FK Lovćen
- 1993/94 - FK Jedinstvo
- 1994/95 - OFK Igalo
- 1995/96 - FK Mladost
- 1996/97 - FK Čelik
- 1997/98 - FK Zeta
- 1998/99 - FK Mladost
- 1999/00 - FK Iskra (13 other teams in higher division)

== FR Yugoslavia Second League - South Region ==
- 2000/01 - FK Rudar Pljevlja (3 other teams in higher division)
- 2001/02 - FK Mogren (3 other teams in higher division)
- 2002-03 - FK Kom (4 other teams in higher division)
- 2003-04 - FK Budućnost (3 other teams in higher division)

== Montenegrin First League ==
- 2004-05 - FK Jedinstvo (3 other teams in higher division)
- 2005-06 - FK Rudar Pljevlja (3 other teams in higher division)
