= List of OFK Titograd seasons =

This is a list of the seasons played by OFK Titograd from 1950, when the club is founded. The club's achievements in all major national competitions are listed.

== Seasons in domestic competitions ==
=== Championship ===
==== Final placement by seasons ====
From 1950, FK Mladost played seasons in domestic leagues of SFR Yugoslavia, FR Yugoslavia, Serbia and Montenegro and Montenegro. Below is a list of FK Mladost final placements by every single season.
During the period 1960–1992, FK Mladost played in official competitions under the name OFK Titograd, which was again adopted in 2018.

Season	League	Pos	M	W	D	L	GD	Pts
1954/55	Montenegrin Republic League	2	14	6	4	4	25:19	16
1955/56	Yugoslav Second League	6	17	6	2	9	27:31	14
1956/57	Yugoslav Second League	4	18	8	4	6	32:26	20
1957/58	Yugoslav Second League	7	18	7	2	9	37:34	16
1958/59	Montenegrin Republic League	1	14	10	4	0	52:18	24
1959/60	Montenegrin Republic League	disqualified						
1960/61	Montenegrin Republic League	1	13	11	1	1	48:14	23
1961/62	Montenegrin Republic League	1	16	11	2	3	46:19	24
1962/63	Montenegrin Republic League	9	18	5	3	10	21:36	13
1963/64	Montenegrin Republic League	1	18	12	5	1	42:11	29
1964/65	Montenegrin Republic League	2	18	10	4	4	40:20	24
1965/66	Montenegrin Republic League	2	17	10	4	3	41:17	24
1966/67	Montenegrin Republic League	1	21	16	4	1	67:14	36
1967/68	Montenegrin Republic League	1	22	18	1	3	67:17	37
1968/69	Yugoslav Second League	7	30	12	8	10	35:43	32
1969/70	Yugoslav Second League	7	30	11	7	12	40:42	29
1970/71	Yugoslav Second League	9	30	9	10	11	25:30	28
1971/72	Yugoslav Second League	5	34	13	10	11	41:31	36
1972/73	Yugoslav Second League	8	34	13	8	13	47:41	34
1973/74	Yugoslav Second League	16	34	9	10	15	39:56	28
1974/75	Montenegrin Republic League	1	30	20	9	1	74:18	49
1975/76	Yugoslav Second League	18	34	6	10	18	24:52	22
1976/77	Montenegrin Republic League	2	30	19	8	3	48:20	46
1977/78	Montenegrin Republic League	3	30	12	10	8	43:32	34
1978/79	Montenegrin Republic League	3	26	18	7	1	59:10	43
1979/80	Yugoslav Second League	13	30	7	11	12	38:50	25
1980/81	Yugoslav Second League	12	30	12	6	12	36:54	30
1981/82	Yugoslav Second League	14	30	10	6	14	36:46	26
1982/83	Yugoslav Second League	17	34	6	10	18	23:61	22
1983/84	Montenegrin Republic League	1	30	19	7	4	51:18	45
1984/85	Yugoslav Second League	16	34	11	9	14	33:40	31
1985/86	Montenegrin Republic League	9	30	11	8	11	38:36	30
1986/87	Montenegrin Republic League	1	26	17	8	1	45:13	42
1987/88	Yugoslav Second League	16	34	12	4	18	37:54	28
1988/89	Yugoslav Third League	13	34	13	3	18	40:49	29
1989/90	Yugoslav Third League	17	34	9	5	20	29:44	23
1990/91	Montenegrin Republic League	1	26	20	5	1	58:15	42
1991/92	Yugoslav Third League	10	34	12	4	18	43:40	28
1992/93	Montenegrin Republic League	5	26	8	10	8	21:20	26
1993/94	Montenegrin Republic League	3	34	16	13	5	67:34	45
1994/95	Montenegrin Republic League	2	34	20	9	5	65:21	69
1995/96	Montenegrin Republic League	3	34	20	6	8	67:30	66
1996/97	FR Yugoslavia Second League	9	34	13	6	15	48:54	45
1997/98	FR Yugoslavia Second League	14	34	11	7	16	34:43	40
1998/99	Montenegrin Republic League	1	30	24	3	3	118:13	75
1999/00	FR Yugoslavia Second League	11	34	12	5	17	41:49	41
2000/01	FR Yugoslavia Second League	4	33	15	10	8	56:29	55
2001/02	FR Yugoslavia Second League	4	33	14	8	11	45:31	50
2002/03	SCG Second League	4	33	15	8	10	45:33	53
2003/04	SCG Second League	7	36	11	10	15	46:57	43
2004/05	SCG Second League	10	36	9	11	16	31:49	38
2005/06	Montenegrin Republic League	2	33	18	11	4	51:26	65
2006/07	Montenegrin First League	9	33	9	11	13	34:49	38
2007/08	Montenegrin First League	12	33	4	7	22	16:44	19
2008/09	Montenegrin Second League	2	33	20	6	7	67:28	66
2009/10	Montenegrin Second League	1	33	21	8	4	75:32	71
2010/11	Montenegrin First League	5	33	10	11	12	36:35	41
2011/12	Montenegrin First League	7	33	10	7	16	32:45	37
2012/13	Montenegrin First League	6	33	9	12	12	39:48	39
2013/14	Montenegrin First League	9	33	11	6	16	38:46	39
2014/15	Montenegrin First League	4	33	16	9	8	53:36	57
2015/16	Montenegrin First League	1	33	21	4	8	53:28	67
2016/17	Montenegrin First League	3	33	16	9	8	46:22	57
2017/18	Montenegrin First League	3	36	12	15	9	42:33	51
2018/19	Montenegrin First League	4	36	16	9	11	47:41	57
2019/20	Montenegrin First League	8	31	7	10	14	29:38	31
2020/21	Montenegrin First League	10	36	7	10	19	23:51	31
2021/22	Montenegrin Second League	9	36	6	5	25	26:62	23
2022/23	Montenegrin Third League	7	24	12	2	10	68:43	38

== See also ==
- FK Mladost Podgorica
- Montenegrin First League
- Montenegrin clubs in Yugoslav football competitions (1946–2006)
