= Montenegrin clubs in Yugoslav football competitions (1946–2006) =

Before the independence of Montenegro, football clubs from that country played in different competitions. From 1945 to 2006, Montenegrin club played in the leagues of SFR Yugoslavia, FR Yugoslavia and the State Union of Serbia and Montenegro.

Upon the independence referendum, Montenegrin Football Association established their own competitions, with the Montenegrin First League as a top tier.

== History ==
As a part of the football system in SFR Yugoslavia, FR Yugoslavia and Serbia and Montenegro, Montenegrin clubs played in different leagues. Below is the table with chronology of competition system and leagues in which played Montenegrin teams during the each period from 1945 to 2006.

Country	Period	Tiers
SFR Yugoslavia	1946	Montenegrin Republic League (I)
SFR Yugoslavia	1946–1947	Yugoslav First League (I)
SFR Yugoslavia	1946–1947	Montenegrin Republic League (II)
SFR Yugoslavia	1947–1949	Yugoslav First League (I)
SFR Yugoslavia	1947–1949	Yugoslav Second League (II)
SFR Yugoslavia	1947–1949	Montenegrin Republic League (III)
SFR Yugoslavia	1950	Yugoslav First League (I)
SFR Yugoslavia	1950	Yugoslav Second League (II)
SFR Yugoslavia	1950	Yugoslav Third League (III)
SFR Yugoslavia	1950	Montenegrin Republic League (IV)
SFR Yugoslavia	1951–1961	Yugoslav First League (I)
SFR Yugoslavia	1951–1961	Yugoslav Second League (II)
SFR Yugoslavia	1951–1961	Montenegrin Republic League (III)
SFR Yugoslavia	1961–1988	Yugoslav First League (I)
SFR Yugoslavia	1961–1988	Yugoslav Second League (II)
SFR Yugoslavia	1961–1988	Montenegrin Republic League (III)
SFR Yugoslavia	1961–1988	Montenegrin regional league system (IV)
SFR Yugoslavia	1988–1992	Yugoslav First League (I)
SFR Yugoslavia	1988–1992	Yugoslav Second League (II)
SFR Yugoslavia	1988–1992	Yugoslav Third League (III)
SFR Yugoslavia	1988–1992	Montenegrin Republic League (IV)
SFR Yugoslavia	1988–1992	Montenegrin regional league system (V)
FR Yugoslavia	1992–2001	First League of FR Yugoslavia (I)
FR Yugoslavia	1992–2001	Second League of FR Yugoslavia (II)
FR Yugoslavia	1992–2001	Montenegrin Republic League (III)
FR Yugoslavia	1992–2001	Montenegrin regional league system (IV)
Serbia and Montenegro	2001–2006	First League of Serbia and Montenegro (I)
Serbia and Montenegro	2001–2006	Second League of Serbia and Montenegro (II)
Serbia and Montenegro	2001–2006	Montenegrin Republic League (III)
Serbia and Montenegro	2001–2006	Montenegrin regional league system (IV)

== Montenegrin clubs in Yugoslav First League ==
Overall, seven different Montenegrin clubs played in the First League from 1946 to 2006. Most seasons played FK Budućnost (37) and FK Sutjeska (20). FK Rudar and FK Zeta played 6 seasons in First League, and FK Mogren 5 seasons. For one season, members of First League were FK Kom and FK Jedinstvo.

=== Participants and seasons (1946–1992) ===
During the existence of SFR Yugoslavia, Montenegrin clubs which participated in the First League were FK Budućnost and FK Sutjeska. Budućnost was among the clubs which participated in the first season of Yugoslav First League (1946–47).

Club	Seasons	First season	Last season	Matches	W	D	L	GD
FK Budućnost	26	1946–47	1991–92	789	261	188	335	889:1114
FK Sutjeska	9	1964–65	1991–92	295	90	65	135	346:454

=== Participants and seasons (1992–2006) ===
Due to fact that in new state union of FR Yugoslavia (later Serbia and Montenegro) were two republics, Montenegrin clubs find easier way to qualify for the First League. Among the clubs which played one or more seasons in the First League of FR Yugoslavia and, later, Serbia and Montenegro, were FK Budućnost, FK Sutjeska, FK Rudar, FK Mogren, FK Zeta, FK Kom and FK Jedinstvo.

Club	Seasons	First season	Last season	Matches	W	D	L	GD
FK Budućnost	11	1992–93	2005–06	368	125	78	165	385:512
FK Sutjeska	11	1992–93	2004–05	376	127	71	183	430:575
FK Zeta	6	2000–01	2005–06	192	83	38	71	269:250
FK Rudar	6	1993–94	2002–03	140	39	33	68	129:187
FK Mogren	5	1992–93	2002–03	170	44	35	91	171:289
FK Kom	1	2003–04	2003–04	30	4	2	24	21:67
FK Jedinstvo	1	2005–06	2005–06	30	3	2	25	18:72

== Montenegrin clubs in Yugoslav Second League ==
There are 25 different Montenegrin clubs which played in Second League of SFR Yugoslavia, FR Yugoslavia and Serbia and Montenegro, in the period from 1947 to 2006. In the second tier of national football championship played FK Sutjeska (30 seasons), FK Lovćen (27 seasons), FK Mladost (24 seasons), FK Budućnost (21 seasons), FK Jedinstvo Bijelo Polje (18 seasons), FK Bokelj (15 seasons), FK Mogren (12 seasons), FK Berane (10 seasons), FK Čelik (9 seasons), FK Rudar (9 seasons), FK Iskra (8 seasons), FK Mornar (6 seasons), OFK Petrovac (6 seasons), OFK Grbalj (4 seasons), FK Ibar (4 seasons), FK Zabjelo (4 seasons), FK Arsenal (3 seasons), FK Jedinstvo Herceg Novi (3 seasons), FK Kom (3 seasons), FK Dečić (2 seasons) and FK Zeta (2 seasons). One season in Second League played FK Igalo, FK Jezero, FK Radnički Nikšić and FK Zora.

=== Seasons 1947–1992 ===
Football clubs from Montenegro played in the Yugoslav Second League since its founding in 1947, Montenegrin clubs won the champions title in second tier 14 times. From 1947 to 1992, 15 different Montenegrin clubs played in the Second League of SFR Yugoslavia.

==== Champions ====
Below is the list of Yugoslav Second League champions from Montenegro by seasons. Three clubs won the title - FK Budućnost - 6 times, FK Sutjeska (known as FK Nikšić, too) - 6 times and FK Lovćen - 2 times.

Season	League	Champion	Promotion
1947–48	Second League	FK Budućnost	First League
1955–56	Second League - zone B	FK Lovćen	Playoffs/lost
1956–57	Second League - zone B	FK Lovćen	Playoffs/lost
1957–58	Second League - zone B	FK Sutjeska	First League
1961–62	Second League - East	FK Budućnost	First League
1963–64	Second League - East	FK Sutjeska	First League
1965–66	Second League - East	FK Sutjeska	First League
1968–69	Second League - South	FK Budućnost	Playoffs/lost
1969–70	Second League - South	FK Sutjeska	Playoffs/lost
1970–71	Second League - South	FK Sutjeska	First League
1971–72	Second League - South	FK Budućnost	Playoffs/lost
1972–73	Second League - South	FK Budućnost	Playoffs/lost
1974–75	Second League - East	FK Budućnost	First League
1983–84	Second League - East	FK Sutjeska	First League

==== Participants ====
Overall, 15 different clubs from Montenegro participated in the Yugoslav Second League from season 1947/48 to 1991/92. Among them, FK Sutjeska, FK Lovćen, FK Budućnost and FK Mladost are only clubs which played more than 10 seasons in the Second League of SFR Yugoslavia.

Below is the list of Montenegrin clubs which played in Yugoslav Second League 1947-1992.

Club	Seasons	First season	Last season
FK Sutjeska	27	1955–56	1990–91
FK Lovćen	21	1953–54	1985–86
FK Budućnost	18	1947–48	1975–76
FK Mladost	16	1955–56	1987–88
FK Bokelj	9	1951	1986–87
FK Jedinstvo Bijelo Polje	9	1955–56	1991–92
FK Berane	6	1955–56	1987–88
FK Iskra	3	1956–57	1971–72
FK Arsenal	3	1955–56	1957–58
FK Jedinstvo Herceg Novi	3	1955–56	1957–58
FK Mogren	3	1981–82	1991–92
FK Čelik	1	1968–69	1968–69
FK Radnički	1	1955–56	1955–56
FK Rudar	1	1972–73	1972–73
FK Zabjelo	1	1969–70	1969–70

=== Seasons 1992–2006 ===
During the period 1992-2006, Montenegrin clubs competed at second tier divisions which were a part of FR Yugoslavia / Serbia and Montenegro football system. There was four different periods and competition formats of Second League:
1992–93 - 1995–96 - Unified league
1996–97 - 1998–99 - Two divisions (east/west)
1999–2000 - Three divisions (north/east/west)
2000–01 - 2005–06 Four divisions (north/east/west/south - Montenegrin)
Bold - divisions in which played clubs from Montenegro

==== Champions ====
During the period 1992–2006, six different Montenegrin clubs won the title in FR Yugoslavia/Serbia and Montenegro Second League - FK Mogren - 2 times, FK Rudar - 2 times, FK Zeta - 1, FK Kom - 1, FK Budućnost - 1 and FK Jedinstvo Bijelo Polje - 1. Below is the list of Yugoslav Second League champions from Montenegro by seasons (1992–2006).

Season	League	Champion	Promotion
1997–98	Second League - West	FK Mogren	First League
1999–2000	Second League - West	FK Zeta	First League
2000–01	Second League - South	FK Rudar	First League
2001–02	Second League - South	FK Mogren	First League
2002–03	Second League - South	FK Kom	First League
2003–04	Second League - South	FK Budućnost	First League
2004–05	Second League - Montenegro	FK Jedinstvo Bijelo Polje	First League
2005–06	Second League - Montenegro	FK Rudar	First League

==== Participants ====
From the season 1992–93 until 2005–06, 22 Montenegrin teams played in the Yugoslav / Serbia and Montenegro Second League. Biggest number of seasons had FK Jedinstvo Bijelo Polje and FK Mogren (9). Below is the list of Montenegrin clubs which played in Yugoslav Second League 1992–2006.

Club	Seasons	First season	Last season
FK Jedinstvo Bijelo Polje	9	1992–93	2004–05
FK Mogren	9	1994–95	2005–06
FK Čelik	8	1996–97	2003–04
FK Mladost	8	1996–97	2004–05
FK Rudar	8	1992–93	2005–06
FK Bokelj	7	1999–2000	2005–06
FK Lovćen	6	1993–94	2002–03
FK Mornar	6	1995–96	2005–06
FK Iskra	5	1994–95	2002–03
OFK Petrovac	5	2001–02	2005–06
FK Berane	4	1997–98	2000–01
OFK Grbalj	4	1999–2000	2005–06
FK Ibar	4	1997–98	2001–02
FK Budućnost	3	2001–02	2003–04
FK Kom	3	2002–03	2005–06
FK Sutjeska	3	1995–96	2005–06
FK Zabjelo	3	2000–01	2002–03
FK Zeta	2	1998–99	1999–2000
FK Dečić	2	2004–05	2005–06
FK Igalo	1	1996–97	1996–97
FK Jezero	1	2002–03	2002–03
FK Zora	1	2005–06	2005–06

== Montenegrin clubs in Yugoslav Third League ==
Yugoslav Third League is rank which existed five seasons, and 11 different Montenegrin clubs were part of it. League existed during the season 1950, and from 1988–89 to 1991–92. During the season 1950, competition was named Third League, and from 1988 to 1992 it was played under the name Inter-Republic League.

=== Participants ===
From the season 1950 until 1991–92, 8 Montenegrin teams played in the Yugoslav Third League. Biggest number of seasons had FK Berane and FK Bokelj (4). Below is the list of Montenegrin clubs which played in Yugoslav Third League.

Club	Seasons	First season	Last season
FK Bokelj Kotor	4	1988–89	1991–92
FK Berane	4	1988–89	1991–92
FK Jedinstvo Bijelo Polje	3	1988–89	1990–91
FK Lovćen Cetinje	3	1988–89	1991–92
FK Mornar Bar	3	1989–90	1991–92
FK Mladost Podgorica	2	1989–90	1991–92
FK Mogren Budva	2	1988–89	1989–90
FK Igalo	1	1988–89	1988–89
FK Rudar Pljevlja	1	1991–92	1991–92
FK Ribnica Podgorica	1	1991–92	1991–92
FK Sutjeska Nikšić	1	1950	1950

== Montenegrin regional league system ==
From 1968, regional leagues are the lowest-rank competition in Montenegro. There are three leagues (North, Center, South). Regional system is still existing competition, known as Montenegrin Third League.

=== Champions by seasons ===
==== Seasons 1968–2006 ====
Season	North	Center	South
1968–69	FK Jezero	FK Zeta	FK Muo
1969–70	FK Gorštak	FK Kom	FK Orjen
1970–71	FK Ibar	FK Grafičar	FK Mogren
1971–72	FK Jezero	FK Dečić	FK Mogren
1972–73	FK Tekstilac	OFK Mladost	FK Orjen
1973–74	FK Berane	FK Partizan	OFK Petrovac
1974–75	FK Jezero	FK Zora	FK Mogren
1975–76	FK Komovi	FK Dečić	FK Igalo
1976–77	FK Berane	FK Zabjelo	FK Cetinje
1977–78	FK Rudar	FK Otrant	FK Igalo
1978–79	FK Ibar	FK Metalac	FK Mornar
1979–80	FK Jezero	FK Titeks	FK Arsenal
1980–81	FK Berane	FK Zabjelo	FK Cetinje
1981–82	FK Jedinstvo	FK Crvena Stijena	FK Bokakomerc
1982–83	FK Tekstilac	FK Dečić	FK Igalo
1983–84	FK Ibar	FK Ribnica	FK Arsenal
1984–85	FK Gusinje	FK Gorštak	FK Mogren
1985–86	FK Jedinstvo	FK Grafičar	FK Mornar
1986–87	FK Jezero	FK Dečić	FK Luka Bar
1987–88	FK Rudar	FK Crvena Stijena	FK Arsenal
1988–89	FK Brskovo	FK Zeta	FK Cetinje
1989–90	FK Jezero	FK Zora	FK Otrant
1990–91	FK Gorštak	FK Iskra	FK Orjen
1991–92	FK Brskovo	FK Zabjelo	FK Otrant
1992–93	FK Ibar	FK Zeta	FK Igalo
1993–94	FK Gusinje	FK Zora	FK Cetinje
1994–95	FK Polimlje	FK Zeta	FK Igalo
1995–96	FK Komovi	FK Bratstvo	OFK Grbalj
1996–97	FK Jedinstvo	FK Crvena Stijena	FK Otrant
1997–98	FK Jezero	FK Kom	FK Cetinje
1998–99	FK Polimlje	FK Gorštak	FK Rumija
1999–2000	FK Pljevlja	FK Crvena Zvijezda	FK Mornar
2000–01	FK Županica	FK Drezga	FK Bijela
2001–02	FK Brskovo	FK Dečić	FK Otrant
2002–03	FK Tekstilac	FK Dečić	FK Igalo
2003–04	FK Brskovo	FK Grafičar	FK Cetinje
2004–05	FK Berane	FK Zabjelo	FK Igalo
2005–06	FK Jezero	FK Zabjelo	FK Otrant

== See also ==
- Football in Montenegro
- Montenegrin Republic League
- Montenegrin Republic Cup (1947–2006)
- Montenegrin clubs in European football competitions
- Montenegrin First League
- Montenegrin Second League
- Montenegrin Third League
- Montenegrin Cup
