= OFK Gusinje =

Montenegrin football club

- Full name: Omladinski fudbalski klub Gusinje
- Founded: 2022
- Stadium: Gusinje City Stadium
- Capacity: 2,000
- League: Montenegrin Third League
- 2024-25: Montenegrin Third League 7th of 9

Omladinski Fudbalski Klub Gusinje is a Montenegrin football club based in the town of Gusinje. The club currently competes in the Montenegrin Third League. OFK Gusinje plays its home matches at Gusinje City Stadium, which has a seating capacity of 2,000.

== History ==
OFK Gusinje was founded in 2022. They played their first season in the 2022–23 Montenegrin Third League. During that season, they finished in 7th place. In the following season, they finished in 6th place with 23 points, having had 2 points deducted earlier in the season.

In the 2024–25 season, OFK Gusinje failed to earn promotion to the Montenegrin Second League, finishing in 7th place again. They also had 1 point deducted earlier in the season.

== Stadium ==
OFK Gusinje play their home matches at the Gusinje City Stadium. The stadium features a single stand with a seating capacity of 2,000 spectators. Construction of the venue began in 1994, and it was officially opened in 1996. OFK Gusinje share the stadium with the local football club FK Gusinje.

== List of seasons ==
Under its existence OFK Gusinje has played 3 seasons, below is a list of all seasons in OFK Gusinjes history:

Season	League	Position	P	W	D	L	F	A	GD	Pts
2022–23	Montenegrin Third League	7	24	7	4	13	30	53	-23	24
2023–24 (Note: OFK Gusinje got a 2 point deduction this season)	Montenegrin Third League	6	24	7	4	13	36	62	-26	23
2024–25 (Note: OFK Gusinje got a 1 point deduction this season)	Montenegrin Third League	7	24	7	3	14	34	77	-43	23
