= Montenegrin clubs in European football competitions =

After the end of every competitive season, football clubs from Montenegro play in European competitions.
Teams from Montenegro have been playing on the international scene since they represented SFR Yugoslavia during the 1970s. Since 2006, Montenegrin teams have played as representatives of independent Montenegro, and qualified through the Montenegrin First League and Montenegrin Cup.
Currently, three Montenegrin clubs take part in UEFA European Cups. The champion of the First Montenegrin League plays in UEFA Champions League qualifiers. The second placed team from the First League play in UEFA Conference League qualifiers. The winner of the Montenegrin Cup also plays in the Conference league.

== UEFA Rankings ==
=== Current rankings (2027–28) ===
UEFA Country Ranking for league participation in 2027–28 European football season (Previous year rank in italics)

- 48 (52) (Belarus) Belarusian Premier League
- 49 (48) Luxembourg National Division
- 50 (47) (Montenegro) Montenegrin First League
- 51 (51) (North Macedonia) Macedonian First Football League
- 52 (50) (Georgia (country)) Erovnuli Liga

=== History of rankings ===
Since independence (2006) and establishing of Montenegrin First League and other national competitions, Montenegro is a full-member of UEFA. Since then, Montenegrin League is present on UEFA Country Ranking system.
Below is a historical list of Montenegrin rankings and country coefficient.

| Year | Position | Change | Coefficient | Teams |
|---|---|---|---|---|
| 2008 | 51 | - | 0.500 | 4 |
| 2009 | 50 | | 1.000 | 4 |
| 2010 | 47 | | 2.125 | 4 |
| 2011 | 43 | | 3.875 | 4 |
| 2012 | 42 | | 4.375 | 4 |
| 2013 | 41 | | 5.250 | 4 |
| 2014 | 39 | | 6.000 | 4 |
| 2015 | 41 | | 5.625 | 4 |
| 2016 | 44 | | 4.875 | 4 |
| 2017 | 43 | | 5.250 | 4 |
| 2018 | 43 | | 5.000 | 4 |
| 2019 | 49 | | 4.125 | 4 |
| 2020 | 50 | | 4.375 | 4 |
| 2021 | 50 | | 5.000 | 4 |
| 2022 | 53 | | 4.875 | 4 |
| 2023 | 54 | | 4.750 | 3 |
| 2024 | 53 | | 5.708 | 3 |
| 2025 | 47 | | 7.208 | 3 |
| 2026 | 50 | | 6.583 | 3 |

== UEFA competitions ==
=== Performances by season ===
Historically, Montenegrin football clubs played in four UEFA competitions for clubs - the UEFA Champions League, UEFA Europa League (formerly UEFA Cup), UEFA Europa Conference League and Intertoto Cup.
The champions of Montenegro have never played in the group phase of the UEFA Champions League, and the most successful in the qualifiers was FK Zeta Golubovci in the 2007–08 season.
The best performances in the UEFA Europa League were FK Zeta who played in the playoffs, and OFK Titograd, FK Budućnost and FK Sutjeska which played in Round 3. The most successful in the Intertoto Cup was FK Budućnost Podgorica.
Below is a list of games of all Montenegrin clubs in UEFA competitions.

==== UEFA Champions League ====
| Season | Club | Round | Opponent | Home | Away | Aggregate |
|---|---|---|---|---|---|---|
| 2007–08 | Zeta | 1QR | (Lithuania) FBK Kaunas | 3–1 | 2–3 | 5–4 |
| 2007–08 | Zeta | 2QR | (Scotland) Rangers | 0–1 | 0–2 | 0–3 |
| 2008–09 | Budućnost | 1QR | (Finland) Tampere United | 1–1 | 1–2 | 2–3 |
| 2009–10 | Mogren | 1QR | (Malta) Hibernians | 4–0 | 2–0 | 6–0 |
| 2009–10 | Mogren | 2QR | (Denmark) Copenhagen | 0–6 | 0–6 | 0–12 |
| 2010–11 | Rudar | 1QR | (San Marino) Tre Fiori | 4–1 | 3–0 | 7–1 |
| 2010–11 | Rudar | 2QR | (Bulgaria) Litex Lovech | 0–4 | 0–1 | 0–5 |
| 2011–12 | Mogren | 2QR | (Bulgaria) Litex Lovech | 1–2 | 0–3 | 1–5 |
| 2012–13 | Budućnost | 2QR | (Poland) Śląsk Wrocław | 0–2 | 1–0 | 1–2 |
| 2013–14 | Sutjeska | 2QR | (Moldova) Sheriff Tiraspol | 0–5 | 1–1 | 1–6 |
| 2014–15 | Sutjeska | 2QR | (Moldova) Sheriff Tiraspol | 0–3 | 0–2 | 0–5 |
| 2015–16 | Rudar | 2QR | (Azerbaijan) Qarabağ | 0–1 | 0–0 | 0–1 |
| 2016–17 | OFK Titograd | 2QR | (Bulgaria) Ludogorets Razgrad | 0–3 | 0–2 | 0–5 |
| 2017–18 | Budućnost | 2QR | (Serbia) Partizan | 0–0 | 0–2 | 0–2 |
| 2018–19 | Sutjeska | 1QR | (Kazakhstan) Astana | 0–2 | 0–1 | 0–3 |
| 2019–20 | Sutjeska | 1QR | (Slovakia) Slovan Bratislava | 1–1 (a.e.t.) | 1–1 | 2–2 (3–2 p.) |
| 2019–20 | Sutjeska | 2QR | (Cyprus) APOEL | 0–1 | 0–3 | 0–4 |
| 2020–21 | Budućnost | 1QR | (Bulgaria) Ludogorets Razgrad | 1–3 | | |
| 2021–22 | Budućnost | 1QR | (Finland) HJK | 0–4 | 1–3 | 1–7 |
| 2022–23 | Sutjeska | 1QR | (Bulgaria) Ludogorets Razgrad | 0–1 | 0–2 | 0–3 |
| 2023–24 | Budućnost | PR | (Andorra) Atlètic Club d'Escaldes | 3–0 | | |
| 2023–24 | Budućnost | PR | (Iceland) Breiðablik | 0–5 | | |
| 2024–25 | Dečić | 1QR | (Wales) The New Saints | 1–1 | 0–3 | 1–4 |
| 2025–26 | Budućnost | 1QR | (Armenia) Noah | 2–2 | 0–1 | 2–3 |
| 2026–27 | Sutjeska | 1QR | (Kazakhstan) Kairat | 0–2 | 1–2 | 1–4 |

==== UEFA Cup/Europa League ====
| Season | Club | Round | Opponent | Home | Away | Aggregate |
|---|---|---|---|---|---|---|
| 2005–06 | Zeta | 2QR | (Bosnia and Herzegovina) Široki Brijeg | 0–1 | 1–4 | 1–5 |
| 2007–08 | Budućnost | 1QR | (Croatia) Hajduk Split | 1–1 | 0–1 | 1–2 |
| 2007–08 | Rudar | 1QR | (Cyprus) Omonia | 0–2 | 0–2 | 0–4 |
| 2008–09 | Mogren | 1QR | (Israel) Ironi Kiryat Shmona | 0–3 | 1–1 | 1–4 |
| 2008–09 | Zeta | 1QR | (Slovenia) Interblock | 1–1 | 0–1 | 1–2 |
| 2009–10 | Budućnost | 1QR | (Poland) Polonia Warsaw | 0–2 | 1–0 | 1–2 |
| 2009–10 | Petrovac | 2QR | (Cyprus) Anorthosis Famagusta | 3–1 (a.e.t.) | 1–2 | 4–3 |
| 2009–10 | Petrovac | 3QR | (Austria) Sturm Graz | 1–2 | 0–5 | 1–7 |
| 2009–10 | Sutjeska | 1QR | (Belarus) Partizan Minsk | 1–1 | 1–2 | 2–3 |
| 2010–11 | Budućnost | 2QR | (Azerbaijan) Baku | 1–2 | 3–0 (Note: UEFA awarded Budućnost Podgorica a 3–0 win due to Baku fielding a suspended player. The original match had ended in a 2–1 win for Baku.) | 4–2 |
| 2010–11 | Budućnost | 3QR | (Denmark) Brøndby | 1–2 | 0–1 | 1–3 |
| 2010–11 | Mogren | 1QR | (Andorra) UE Santa Coloma | 2–0 | 3–0 | 5–0 |
| 2010–11 | Mogren | 2QR | (Israel) Maccabi Tel Aviv | 2–1 | 0–2 | 2–3 |
| 2010–11 | Zeta | 1QR | (Moldova) Dacia Chişinău | 1–1 | 0–0 | 1–1 (a) |
| 2011–12 | Budućnost | 1QR | (Albania) Flamurtari | 1–3 | 2–1 | 3–4 |
| 2011–12 | Rudar | 2QR | Austria Wien | 0–3 | 0–2 | 0–5 |
| 2011–12 | Zeta | 1QR | (Slovakia) Spartak Trnava | 2–1 | 0–3 | 2–4 |
| 2012–13 | Čelik | 1QR | (Bosnia and Herzegovina) Borac Banja Luka | 1–1 | 2–2 | 3–3 (a) |
| 2012–13 | Čelik | 2QR | (Ukraine) Metalurh Donetsk | 2–4 | 0–7 | 2–11 |
| 2012–13 | Rudar | 1QR | (Armenia) Shirak | 0–1 | 1–1 | 1–2 |
| 2012–13 | Zeta | 1QR | (Armenia) Pyunik | 1–2 | 3–0 | 4–2 |
| 2012–13 | Zeta | 2QR | (Finland) JJK | 1–0 | 2–3 | 3–3 (a) |
| 2012–13 | Zeta | 3QR | (Bosnia and Herzegovina) Sarajevo | 1–0 | 1–2 | 2–2 (a) |
| 2012–13 | Zeta | PO | (Netherlands) PSV Eindhoven | 0–5 | 0–9 | 0–14 |
| 2013–14 | Čelik | 1QR | (Hungary) Budapest Honvéd | 1–4 | 0–9 | 1–13 |
| 2013–14 | Rudar | 1QR | (Armenia) Mika | 1–0 | 1–1 | 2–1 |
| 2013–14 | Rudar | 2QR | (Poland) Śląsk Wrocław | 2–2 | 0–4 | 2–6 |
| 2013–14 | OFK Titograd | 1QR | (Hungary) Videoton | 1–0 | 1–2 | 2–2 (a) |
| 2013–14 | OFK Titograd | 2QR | (Slovakia) Senica | 2–2 | 1–0 | 3–2 |
| 2013–14 | OFK Titograd | 3QR | (Spain) Sevilla | 1–6 | 0–3 | 1–9 |
| 2014–15 | Budućnost | 1QR | (San Marino) Folgore | 3–0 | 2–1 | 5–1 |
| 2014–15 | Budućnost | 2QR | (Cyprus) Omonia | 0–0 | 0–2 | 0–2 |
| 2014–15 | Čelik | 1QR | (Slovenia) Koper | 0–5 | 0–4 | 0–9 |
| 2014–15 | Lovćen | 1QR | (Bosnia and Herzegovina) Željezničar Sarajevo | 0–1 | 0–0 | 0–1 |
| 2015–16 | Budućnost | 1QR | (Latvia) Spartaks Jūrmala | 1–3 | 0–0 | 1–3 |
| 2015–16 | Sutjeska | 1QR | (Hungary) Debrecen | 2–0 | 0–3 | 2–3 |
| 2015–16 | OFK Titograd | 1QR | (Azerbaijan) Neftchi Baku | 1–1 | 2–2 | 3–3 (a) |
| 2015–16 | OFK Titograd | 2QR | (Albania) Kukësi | 2–4 | 1–0 | 3–4 |
| 2016–17 | Bokelj | 1QR | (Serbia) Vojvodina | 1–1 | 0–5 | 1–6 |
| 2016–17 | Budućnost | 1QR | (North Macedonia) Rabotnički | 1–0 | 1–1 | 2–1 |
| 2016–17 | Budućnost | 2QR | (Belgium) Genk | 2–0 (a.e.t.) | 0–2 | 2–2 (2–4 p.) |
| 2016–17 | OFK Titograd | 1QR | (Albania) Kukësi | 0–1 | 1–1 | 1–2 |
| 2017–18 | Sutjeska | 1QR | (Bulgaria) Levski Sofia | 0–0 | 1–3 | 1–3 |
| 2017–18 | OFK Titograd | 1QR | (Armenia) Gandzasar | 1–0 | 3–0 | 4–0 |
| 2017–18 | OFK Titograd | 2QR | (Austria) Sturm Graz | 0–3 | 1–0 | 1–3 |
| 2017–18 | Zeta | 1QR | (Bosnia and Herzegovina) Željezničar Sarajevo | 2–2 | 0–1 | 2–3 |
| 2018–19 | Budućnost | 1QR | (Slovakia) Trenčín | 0–2 | 1–1 | 1–3 |
| 2018–19 | Rudar | 1QR | (Serbia) Partizan | 0−3 | 0–3 | 0–6 |
| 2018–19 | Sutjeska | 2QR | (Armenia) Alashkert | 0–1 | 0–0 | 0–1 |
| 2018–19 | OFK Titograd | 1QR | (Faroe Islands) B36 Tórshavn | 1–2 | 0−0 | 1–2 |
| 2019–20 | Budućnost | 1QR | (Estonia) Narva Trans | 4–1 | 2–0 | 6–1 |
| 2019–20 | Budućnost | 2QR | (Ukraine) Zorya Luhansk | 1–3 | 0–1 | 1–4 |
| 2019–20 | Sutjeska | 3QR | (Northern Ireland) Linfield | 1–2 | 2–3 | 3–5 |
| 2019–20 | OFK Titograd | 1QR | (Bulgaria) CSKA Sofia | 0−0 | 0–4 | 0−4 |
| 2019–20 | Zeta | 1QR | (Hungary) Fehérvár | 1–5 | 0–0 | 1−5 |
| 2020–21 | Budućnost | 2QR | (Kazakhstan) Astana | 1–0 | | |
| 2020–21 | Budućnost | 3QR | (Bosnia and Herzegovina) Sarajevo | 1–2 | | |
| 2020–21 | Iskra | PR | (Andorra) FC Santa Coloma | 0–0 (4–3 p.) | | |
| 2020–21 | Iskra | 1QR | (Bulgaria) Lokomotiv Plovdiv | 0–1 | | |
| 2020–21 | Sutjeska | 1QR | (Bosnia and Herzegovina) Borac Banja Luka | 0–1 | | |
| 2020–21 | Zeta | PR | (Andorra) Engordany | 3–1 | | |
| 2020–21 | Zeta | 1QR | (Luxembourg) Progrès Niederkorn | 0–3 | | |

==== UEFA Conference League ====
| Season | Club | Round | Opponent | Home | Away | Aggregate |
|---|---|---|---|---|---|---|
| 2021–22 | Budućnost | 2QR | (Faroe Islands) HB Tórshavn | 0–2 | 0–4 | 0–6 |
| 2021–22 | Dečić | 1QR | (Kosovo) Drita | 0–1 | 1–2 | 1–3 |
| 2021–22 | Podgorica | 1QR | (Albania) Laçi | 1−0 | 0−3 (a.e.t.) | 1–3 |
| 2021–22 | Sutjeska | 1QR | (Georgia (country)) Gagra | 1–0 | 1–1 | 2–1 |
| 2021–22 | Sutjeska | 2QR | (Israel) Maccabi Tel Aviv | 0–0 | 1–3 | 1–3 |
| 2022–23 | Budućnost | 1QR | (Kosovo) Llapi | 2–0 | 2–2 | 4–2 |
| 2022–23 | Budućnost | 2QR | (Iceland) Breiðablik | 2–1 | 0–2 | 2–3 |
| 2022–23 | Dečić | 1QR | (Belarus) Dinamo Minsk | 1–2 | 1–1 | 2–3 |
| 2022–23 | Iskra | 1QR | (Albania) Laçi | 0–1 | 0–0 | 0–1 |
| 2022–23 | Sutjeska | 2QR | (Faroe Islands) KÍ Klaksvík | 0–0 | 0–1 | 0–1 |
| 2023–24 | Arsenal | 1QR | (Armenia) Alashkert | 1–6 | 1–1 | 2–7 |
| 2023–24 | Budućnost | 2QR | (North Macedonia) Struga | 3–4 | 0–1 | 3–5 |
| 2023–24 | Sutjeska | 1QR | (San Marino) Cosmos | 1–0 | 1–1 | 2–1 |
| 2023–24 | Sutjeska | 2QR | (Andorra) Santa Coloma | 2–0 | 0–3 (a.e.t.) | 2–3 |
| 2024–25 | Budućnost | 1QR | (Kosovo) Malisheva | 3–0 | 0–1 | 3–1 |
| 2024–25 | Budućnost | 2QR | (Bulgaria) CSKA 1948 | 1–1 (a.e.t.) | 0–1 | 1–2 |
| 2024–25 | Dečić | 2QR | (Georgia (country)) Dinamo Batumi | 0–0 | 2–0 | 2−0 |
| 2024–25 | Dečić | 3QR | (Finland) HJK | 2–1 | 0–1 | 2–2 (3–4 p.) |
| 2024–25 | Mornar | 1QR | (Georgia (country)) Dinamo Tbilisi | 2–1 | 1–1 | 3–2 |
| 2024–25 | Mornar | 2QR | (Serbia) Radnički 1923 | 2–1 (a.e.t.) | 0–1 | 2–2 (4–3 p.) |
| 2024–25 | Mornar | 3QR | (Hungary) Paksi | 2–2 | 0–3 | 2–5 |
| 2025–26 | Budućnost | 2QR | (Moldova) Milsami | 0–0 | 1–2 | 1–2 |
| 2025–26 | Dečić | 1QR | (North Macedonia) Sileks | 2–0 | 1–2 | 3–2 |
| 2025–26 | Dečić | 2QR | (Austria) Rapid Wien | 0–2 | 2–4 | 2−6 |
| 2025–26 | Sutjeska | 1QR | (Belarus) Dynamo Brest | 1–2 | 2–0 | 3–2 |
| 2025–26 | Sutjeska | 2QR | (Israel) Beitar | 1–2 | 2–5 | 3–7 |
| 2026–27 | Dečić | 1QR | (Latvia) Liepāja | 1–2 | 0–1 | 1–3 |
| 2026–27 | Mornar | 1QR | (Moldova) Atlètic Club d'Escaldes | 1–2 | 1–2 | 2–4 |
| 2026–27 | Petrovac | 1QR | (Lithuania) Žalgiris | 1–3 | 1–2 | 2–5 |
| 2026–27 | Sutjeska | 2QR | (Belarus) ML Vitebsk | 1–2 | 0–3 | 1–5 |

==== Intertoto Cup ====
| Season | Club | Round | Opponent | Home | Away | Aggregate |
|---|---|---|---|---|---|---|
| 1981 | Budućnost | Group 4 | (Austria) Wacker Innsbruck | 1–2 | 3–1 | 1st |
| 1981 | Budućnost | Group 4 | (Sweden) Östers | 3–1 | 0–0 | 1st |
| 1981 | Budućnost | Group 4 | (Denmark) Odense | 4–2 | 1–1 | 1st |
| 1995 | Budućnost | Group 7 | (Estonia) Tervis Pärnu | 3–1 | | 4th |
| 1995 | Budućnost | Group 7 | (Cyprus) Nea Salamis Famagusta | 1–1 | | 4th |
| 1995 | Budućnost | Group 7 | (Germany) Bayer Leverkusen | 0–3 | | 4th |
| 1995 | Budućnost | Group 7 | (Greece) OFI | 3–4 | | 4th |
| 2003 | Sutjeska | 1R | Union Luxembourg | 3–0 | 1–1 | 4–1 |
| 2003 | Sutjeska | 2R | (Finland) Tampere United | 0–1 | 0–0 | 0–1 |
| 2005 | Budućnost | 1R | (Malta) Valletta | 2–2 | 5–0 | 7–2 |
| 2005 | Budućnost | 2R | (Spain) Deportivo La Coruña | 2–1 | 0–3 | 2–4 |
| 2006 | Zeta | 2R | (Slovenia) Maribor | 1–2 | 0–2 | 1–4 |
| 2007 | Grbalj | 1R | (Romania) Gloria Bistrița | 1–1 | 1–2 | 2–3 |
| 2008 | Grbalj | 1R | (Bosnia and Herzegovina) Čelik Zenica | 2–1 | 2–3 | 4–4 (a) |
| 2008 | Grbalj | 2R | (Turkey) Sivasspor | 2–2 | 0–1 | 2–3 |

=== Performances by clubs ===
16 different Montenegrin clubs have played in UEFA competitions. Before the founding of the Montenegrin First League and Montenegrin Cup, three clubs played in European Cups as a representatives of Yugoslavia / Serbia and Montenegro. Eight other clubs played their first seasons in UEFA competitions after Montenegrin independence.
Below is a table with Montenegrin clubs' scores in UEFA competitions.

| Team | Seasons | G | W | D | L | GD | Pts |
|---|---|---|---|---|---|---|---|
| FK Budućnost Podgorica | 21 | 69 | 21 | 15 | 33 | 82:100 | 78 |
| FK Sutjeska Nikšić | 13 | 41 | 6 | 12 | 23 | 28:59 | 30 |
| OFK Titograd | 6 | 20 | 6 | 5 | 9 | 18:34 | 23 |
| FK Zeta Golubovci | 10 | 28 | 6 | 5 | 17 | 25:56 | 23 |
| FK Mogren Budva | 4 | 12 | 5 | 1 | 6 | 15:24 | 16 |
| FK Rudar Pljevlja | 8 | 20 | 3 | 5 | 12 | 13:33 | 14 |
| FK Dečić Tuzi | 4 | 14 | 3 | 3 | 8 | 13:20 | 12 |
| FK Mornar Bar | 1 | 6 | 2 | 2 | 2 | 7:9 | 8 |
| OFK Grbalj | 2 | 6 | 1 | 2 | 3 | 8:10 | 5 |
| FK Podgorica | 1 | 2 | 1 | 0 | 1 | 1:3 | 3 |
| OFK Petrovac | 1 | 4 | 1 | 0 | 3 | 5:10 | 3 |
| FK Čelik Nikšić | 3 | 8 | 0 | 2 | 6 | 6:36 | 2 |
| FK Iskra Danilovgrad | 1 | 2 | 0 | 1 | 1 | 0:1 | 1 |
| FK Lovćen Cetinje | 1 | 2 | 0 | 1 | 1 | 0:1 | 1 |
| FK Arsenal Tivat | 1 | 2 | 0 | 1 | 1 | 2:7 | 1 |
| FK Bokelj Kotor | 1 | 2 | 0 | 1 | 1 | 1:6 | 1 |
| OVERALL | | 238 | 55 | 56 | 127 | 224:409 | 221 |

As of the end of UEFA competitions 2025–26 season.

=== Performances by competition ===
Football clubs from Montenegro have played in three UEFA competitions. Below is a list of performances in every single competition.

| Competition | G | W | D | L | GD |
|---|---|---|---|---|---|
| UEFA Champions League | 45 | 7 | 8 | 30 | 33:88 |
| UEFA Europa League/UEFA Cup | 117 | 27 | 28 | 62 | 100:203 |
| UEFA Europa Conference League | 52 | 13 | 13 | 26 | 49:73 |
| Intertoto Cup | 26 | 8 | 8 | 10 | 41:38 |
| OVERALL | 228 | 55 | 56 | 127 | 223:402 |

As of the end of UEFA competitions 2025–26 season.

=== Scores by opponents' countries ===
Below is the list of performances of Montenegrin clubs against opponents in UEFA competitions by their countries (football federations).

| Opponents' country | G | W | D | L | GD |
|---|---|---|---|---|---|
| Albania | 10 | 3 | 2 | 5 | 8:14 |
| Andorra | 7 | 5 | 1 | 1 | 13:4 |
| Armenia | 14 | 4 | 5 | 5 | 15:16 |
| Austria | 10 | 2 | 0 | 8 | 8:24 |
| Azerbaijan | 6 | 1 | 3 | 2 | 7:6 |
| Belarus | 6 | 1 | 2 | 3 | 7:8 |
| Belgium | 2 | 1 | 0 | 1 | 2:2 |
| Bosnia and Herzegovina | 14 | 2 | 4 | 8 | 13:21 |
| Bulgaria | 15 | 0 | 2 | 13 | 4:31 |
| Croatia | 2 | 0 | 1 | 1 | 1:2 |
| Cyprus | 9 | 1 | 2 | 6 | 5:13 |
| Denmark | 6 | 1 | 1 | 4 | 6:18 |
| Estonia | 3 | 3 | 0 | 0 | 9:2 |
| Faroe Islands | 6 | 0 | 2 | 4 | 1:9 |
| Finland | 10 | 2 | 2 | 6 | 8:16 |
| Germany | 1 | 0 | 0 | 1 | 0:3 |
| Greece | 1 | 0 | 0 | 1 | 3:4 |
| Georgia | 6 | 3 | 3 | 0 | 7:3 |
| Hungary | 10 | 2 | 2 | 6 | 7:28 |
| Iceland | 3 | 1 | 0 | 2 | 2:8 |
| Israel | 8 | 1 | 2 | 5 | 7:17 |
| Kazakhstan | 3 | 1 | 0 | 2 | 1:3 |
| Kosovo | 6 | 2 | 1 | 3 | 8:6 |
| Latvia | 2 | 0 | 1 | 1 | 1:3 |
| Lithuania | 2 | 1 | 0 | 1 | 5:4 |
| Luxembourg | 3 | 1 | 1 | 1 | 4:4 |
| Macedonia | 6 | 2 | 1 | 3 | 8:8 |
| Malta | 4 | 3 | 1 | 0 | 13:2 |
| Moldova | 8 | 0 | 4 | 4 | 3:14 |
| Netherlands | 2 | 0 | 0 | 2 | 0:14 |
| Northern Ireland | 2 | 0 | 0 | 2 | 3:5 |
| Poland | 6 | 2 | 1 | 3 | 4:10 |
| Romania | 2 | 0 | 1 | 1 | 2:3 |
| San Marino | 6 | 5 | 1 | 0 | 14:3 |
| Serbia | 8 | 1 | 2 | 5 | 3:16 |
| Scotland | 2 | 0 | 0 | 2 | 0:3 |
| Slovakia | 8 | 2 | 4 | 2 | 8:11 |
| Slovenia | 6 | 0 | 1 | 5 | 2:15 |
| Spain | 4 | 1 | 0 | 3 | 3:13 |
| Sweden | 2 | 1 | 1 | 0 | 3:1 |
| Turkey | 2 | 0 | 1 | 1 | 2:3 |
| Ukraine | 4 | 0 | 0 | 4 | 3:15 |
| Wales | 2 | 0 | 1 | 1 | 1:4 |
| OVERALL | 238 | 55 | 56 | 125 | 223:409 |

As of the end of UEFA competitions 2025–26 season.

== Other international competitions ==
=== Balkans Cup ===
The Balkans Cup was a regional football competition (1960–1994) in which Montenegrin clubs participated as a representatives of SFR Yugoslavia. Teams from Montenegro which played in the Balkans Cup were FK Budućnost Podgorica and FK Sutjeska Nikšić. FK Budućnost had the biggest success, playing in the 1991 final, after eliminating Galatasaray SK.
Below is a list of Montenegrin clubs in the Balkans Cup.

| Season | Club | Round | Opponent | Home | Away | Aggregate |
|---|---|---|---|---|---|---|
| 1973 | Sutjeska | Group A | (Albania) Labinoti Elbasani | 0–1 | 1–0 | 3rd |
| 1973 | Sutjeska | Group A | (Romania) ASA Târgu Mureș | 1–0 | 0–3 | 3rd |
| 1977 | Budućnost | Group B | (Albania) Vllaznia Shkodër | 2–0 | 1–1 | 2nd |
| 1977 | Budućnost | Group B | (Greece) Panathinaikos | 1–2 | 2–2 | 2nd |
| 1990–91 | Budućnost | QF | (Albania) 17 Nëntori Tirana | 2–1 | 0–0 | 2–1 |
| 1990–91 | Budućnost | SF | (Turkey) Galatasaray | 0–0 | 1–1 | 1–1 (a) |
| 1990–91 | Budućnost | Final | (Romania) Inter Sibiu | 0–0 | 0–1 (a.e.t.) | 0–1 |

== See also ==
- Football in Montenegro
- Montenegrin First League
- Montenegrin Second League
- Montenegrin Third League
- Montenegrin Cup
- Montenegrin clubs in Yugoslav football competitions (1946–2006)
