= 2005–06 Montenegrin First League =

Montenegrin First League
- Season: 2005–06
- Champions: Rudar
- Relegated: Zora; Mornar; Bokelj
- Matches: 180
- Goals: 357 (1.98 per match)

The 2005–06 Montenegrin First League was the last edition of the tournament as the second-highest division. Due to the dissolution of the state union between Serbia and Montenegro in June 2006, the Montenegrin First League became the top division of Montenegro from the 2006–07 season.

== Background ==
In the previous season, Jedinstvo won the league by 10 points over Kom and were promoted to the SuperLiga. They were replaced by Sutjeska who were relegated from the First League. Mladost were relegated to the Montenegrin Republic League and were replaced by Zora who were promoted from the Montenegrin Second League.

=== Format ===
Teams played each other on a quadrouple round-robin basis – twice at home and twice away for a total of 36 matches.

== League table ==
Pos	Team	Pld	W	D	L	GF	GA	GD	Pts	Qualification or relegation
1	Rudar (C)	36	22	6	8	58	34	+24	72	Champions
2	Sutjeska	36	15	11	10	40	28	+12	56	
3	Kom	36	14	10	12	37	32	+5	52	
4	Grbalj	36	14	9	13	34	34	0	51	
5	Mogren (Note: Mornar were docked 1 point due to termination of a match against Mogren in the 19th round.)	36	12	12	12	36	32	+4	48	
6	Petrovac	36	11	14	11	33	34	−1	47 (Note: Head-to-head points: Petrovac 11 pts, Dečić 10 pts, Zora 9 pts.)	
7	Dečić	36	11	14	11	32	34	−2	47	
8	Zora (R)	36	11	14	11	34	35	−1	47	Qualification for relegation play-offs
9	Mornar (R)	36	9	7	20	23	46	−23	33	Relegation to Montenegrin Second League
10	Bokelj (R)	36	7	11	18	30	48	−18	32	Relegation to Montenegrin Second League

Rules for classification: 1st points; 2nd matches won; 3rd head-to-head
(C) Champions; (R) Relegated

== Results ==
=== First half of season ===
Home \ Away	BOK	GRB	DEČ	KOM	MOR	MOG	PET	RUD	SUT	ZOR
Bokelj		0–1	0–0	0–3	2–0	0–0	0–1	1–0	0–0	0–2
Grbalj	2–1		3–0	1–2	3–0	0–3	3–1	2–5	0–0	0–1
Dečić	2–2	1–0		2–0	1–0	5–0	0–0	2–1	0–1	3–0
Kom	2–0	0–1	2–2		2–1	1–0	2–2	0–0	0–2	1–0
Mornar	0–3	2–1	1–1	0–1		0–3	0–0	0–1	1–2	2–0
Mogren	2–2	2–0	2–0	1–0	2–0		2–2	3–0	1–0	2–2
Petrovac	1–0	3–2	1–0	1–0	0–1	0–0		1–1	3–0	1–1
Rudar	4–1	3–0	3–2	1–0	1–0	1–0	3–1		1–1	1–0
Sutjeska	2–2	2–1	3–0	1–1	3–0	1–0	2–0	1–0		2–3
Zora	3–1	1–0	2–1	0–0	1–1	1–1	0–0	3–3	1–0	

Legend: Blue = home team win; Yellow = draw; Red = away team win.

=== Second half of season ===
Home \ Away	BOK	GRB	DEČ	KOM	MOR	MOG	PET	RUD	SUT	ZOR
Bokelj		1–2	0–0	1–0	2–0	1–1	0–2	2–1	1–0	1–2
Grbalj	1–0		0–0	2–1	0–0	1–0	0–0	0–2	0–2	0–0
Dečić	4–2	0–2		1–1	1–0	1–0	0–0	1–0	0–0	1–0
Kom	2–0	0–0	2–0		2–1	0–0	2–0	2–0	0–0	0–2
Mornar	1–0	0–0	1–0	2–1		1–1	2–0	2–0	1–0	1–2
Mogren	1–1	0–1	0–0	3–2	3–0		1–2	0–1	0–2	1–0
Petrovac	1–1	0–2	0–0	1–1	2–0	0–1		1–2	1–1	1–0
Rudar	2–0	1–1	4–0	3–1	2–1	2–0	2–1		1–0	2–2
Sutjeska	2–1	0–0	1–1	1–2	2–0	2–0	1–3	1–2		1–0
Zora	1–1	0–2	0–0	0–1	1–1	0–0	1–0	1–2	1–1	

Legend: Blue = home team win; Yellow = draw; Red = away team win.

== Relegation play-offs ==
The 8th placed team were played against the 2nd placed team of the Montenegrin Republic League in two-legged relegation play-offs after the end of the season.

=== First leg ===
31 May 2006

Mladost	4–0	Zora

Stadion Cvijetin Brijeg, Podgorica
Attendance: 600

=== Second leg ===
4 June 2006

Zora	2–0	Mladost

Gradski stadion, Spuž
Attendance: 400

Mladost gained promotion to 2006–07 Montenegrin First League, while Zora relegated to 2006–07 Montenegrin Second League.

== Aftermath ==
Following the 2006 Montenegrin independence referendum, Montengro declared independence so Serbia and Montenegro became two separate countries. As a result, the Montenegrin First League became the top tier of football in Montenegro from the 2006–07 season rather than a feeder league within the pyramid of football in Serbia and Montenegro. The top seven teams in the First League were joined by the three teams from Montenegro which were playing in the 2005–06 Serbia and Montenegro SuperLiga (Budućnost Podgorica, Jedinstvo and Zeta), the winners of the Montenegrin Second League (Berane) and the play-off winners (Mladost) for the new season.
