= Nenad Vukčević =

Montenegrin footballer and manager

Personal information
- Date of birth: 25 November 1974 (age 51)
- Place of birth: Titograd, SFR Yugoslavia
- Height: 1.87 m (6 ft 2 in)
- Position: Forward

Team information
- Current team: FK Podgorica (manager)

Senior career*
| Years | Team | Apps | (Gls) |
| 1993–1997 | Budućnost Podgorica | 66 | (10) |
| 1997–1999 | Subotica Subotica | 40 | (15) |
| 1999–2003 | Panachaiki | 100 | (22) |
| 2003–2004 | Vyzas | 20 | (5) |
| 2004–2005 | Chalkida | 10 | (2) |
| 2004–2005 | Ljungskile SK | | |
| 2005–2007 | Kom Podgorica | 30 | (2) |

Managerial career
- 2007–2013: Budućnost Podgorica (assistant)
- 2010: Budućnost Podgorica (caretaker)
- 2011–2012: Budućnost Podgorica (U19)
- 2013–2014: Budućnost Podgorica
- 2015–2018: Montenegro U21 (assistant)
- 2016–2017: Kom
- 2019: Rudar Pljevlja
- 2020–2021: Petrovac
- 2021–2022: Podgorica
- * Club domestic league appearances and goals

Nenad Vukčević (born 25 November 1974) is a Montenegrin football manager and former player who recently served as a manager of FK Podgorica. A forward, he played for clubs in FR Yugoslavia, Greece and Sweden.

== Playing career ==
Born in Titograd, SR Montenegro, Vukčević began his career playing for local side FK Budućnost Podgorica. He would also play for FK Spartak Subotica, before joining Super League Greece side Panachaiki in 1999.

He spent four seasons in the Greek top flight with Panachaiki, making 100 league appearances for the club.

== Managerial career ==
Late in his playing career, Vukčević was a player-coach for FK Kom. Later, he joined the staff of FK Budućnost Podgorica, and became the club's caretaker co-manager in 2010.

After several year in the staff of FK Budućnost Podgorica, he was appointed as the manager of the club in July 2013 following the departure of Radislav Dragicevic. He left the club in March 2014.

In June 2016, he became the manager of FK Kom which lasted until March 2017. On 10 January 2019, he was appointed as the manager of FK Rudar Pljevlja.

On 25 September 2019, Vukčević was appointed manager of Petrovac.
