= FK Igalo 1929 =

Association football club in Montenegro

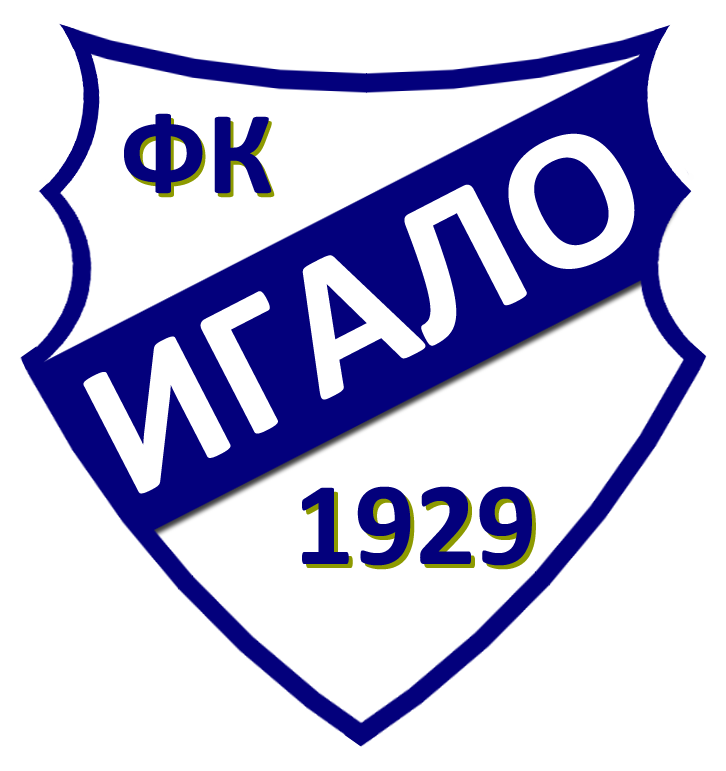
- Full name: Fudbalski klub Igalo 1929
- Founded: 1929; 97 years ago
- Ground: Stadion Solila, Igalo
- Capacity: 1,600
- President: Zoran Krivokapić
- Head Coach: Igor Raičević
- League: Montenegrin Second League
- 2024–25: Montenegrin Second League, 4th of 9
Home colours	Away colours

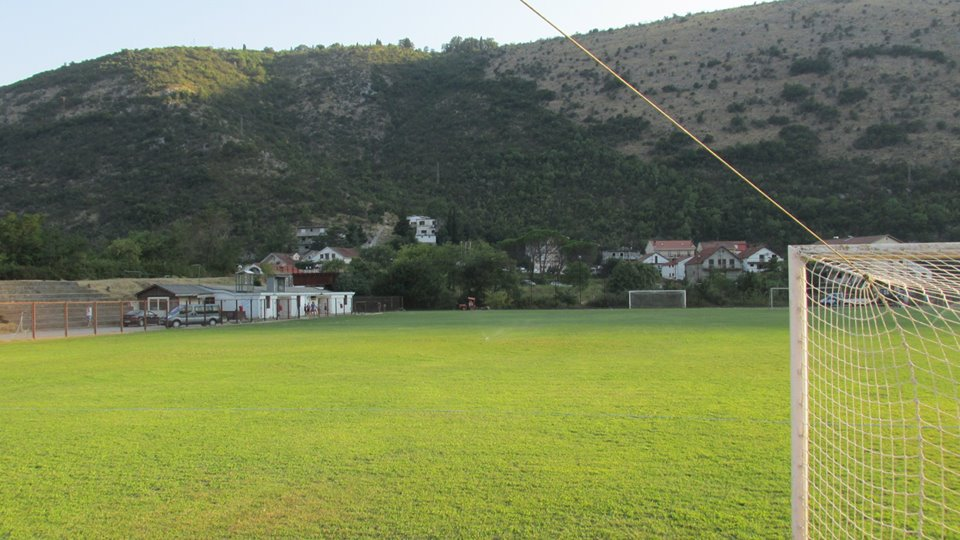
Stadion Solila

FK Igalo is a Montenegrin professional football club based in Igalo, Herceg Novi municipality. The club was founded in 1929 and currently competes in the Montenegrin Second League.

== History ==
Founded as Primorje in 1929, FK Igalo is among the oldest football clubs on the territory of Herceg Novi municipality. Until the seventies, FK Igalo competed in the lower-rank Fourth League – South. Igalo won their first title of Fourth League champion in the 1975–76 season. That success gained them their first-ever promotion to the Montenegrin Republic League, in which they spent most of the time until Montenegrin independence (2006).

In the 1987–88 season, FK Igalo won second place in the Republic League, with promotion to the newly established Yugoslav Third League. They competed only one season in Federal rank, and new success came during the 1995–96 season. In that year, FK Igalo won the title of the Montenegrin Republic League champion, and gained first-ever promotion to the Second Yugoslav League. FK Igalo made that season double, with winning the Montenegrin Republic Cup. The team played one season in the Second League (1996–97), finished at the bottom of the table.

After independence, FK Igalo played as a member of the Montenegrin Third League until the 2010–11 season. That year, the club won the promotion to the Montenegrin Second League. Until now, FK Igalo became a standard member of the Second League, and biggest success in the club's history came at the 2014–15 season. After finished as a third-placed team in the Second League, FK Igalo played in the First League playoffs against FK Mornar. After losing 0–2 in the first match, FK Igalo surprisingly won the second match with the same result (2–0), but they lost chances for the First League promotion after penalties.

=== Mimoza Cup ===
Since 1973, every February, FK Igalo is a host of traditional Mimoza Cup, which hosted a numerous popular teams as Budućnost, Hajduk, Partizan, Crvena zvezda, Željezničar, Luzern and others. It's the oldest football tournament on the Montenegrin seacoast. All games are played at Stadion Solila.

== Honours and achievements ==
- Montenegrin Cup – 0
  - runners-up (1): 2017–18
- Montenegrin Third League – 2
  - winners (2): 2010–11, 2019–20
- Montenegrin Republic League – 1
  - winners (1): 1995–96
- Montenegrin Fourth League – 8
  - winners (8): 1975–76, 1977–78, 1982–83, 1992–93, 1994–95, 1999–00, 2002–03, 2004–05
- Montenegrin Republic Cup – 1
  - winners (1): 1995–96

== Players ==
=== Current squad ===
As of 10 February 2025

Note: Flags indicate national team as defined under FIFA eligibility rules; some limited exceptions apply. Players may hold more than one non-FIFA nationality.

No.	Pos.	Nation	Player
1	GK	MNE	Maksim Milović
2	MF	MNE	Nikola Kosać
3	DF	MNE	Vuk Matejić (on loan from OFK Petrovac)
4	MF	MNE	Boris Žujović
5	DF	SRB	Mihailo Cmiljanović
6	MF	ARG	Nelson Cordoba (captain)
7	MF	MNE	Jovan Mirković
8	MF	MNE	Miloš Đurđević
9	FW	MNE	Ognjen Rolović
10	MF	MNE	Jovan Popović
11	MF	MNE	Boško Dujović
12	GK	MNE	Božidar Matejić (on loan from OFK Petrovac)
14	MF	MNE	Vladimir Pavlović
16	FW	MNE	Stefan Perović

No.	Pos.	Nation	Player
21	DF	MNE	Nihad Balić
22	FW	MNE	Jasmin Muhović
24	DF	MNE	Matija Stijepović
25	MF	MNE	Nikola Popović
30	FW	MNE	Lazar Žižić
31	FW	ALG	Yanis Beghdadi
32	DF	MNE	Miloš Mugoša
33	DF	MNE	Aleksandar Đukanović
35	MF	MNE	Aldin Adžović
44	GK	MNE	Radoš Dubljević (on loan from Sutjeska)
77	FW	MNE	Stefan Čađenović
91	GK	MNE	Miloš Padrov
99	FW	COL	Faver Ramírez
—	FW	TLS	Mouzinho

=== Notable players ===
For all former and current players with Wikipedia article, please see Category:FK Igalo 1929 players.

== Historical list of coaches ==
- (Montenegro) Igor Raičević (2021–)
- (Serbia) Marko Vidojević (2020–2021)
- (Serbia) Miodrag Radanović (2020)
- (Montenegro) Krsto Perović (2019–2020)
- (Montenegro) Dušan Jevrić (2017–2019)
- (Montenegro) Brajan Nenezić (2006–2017)
- (Serbia) Marko Vidojević (2016)
- (Montenegro) Rešad Pepić (2015)
- (Montenegro) Igor Raičević (2015)
- (Montenegro) Petar Gušić (2014–2015)
- (Serbia) Mladen Milinković (2014)
- (Bosnia and Herzegovina) Vladimir Gaćinović (2013)
- (Montenegro) Mihailo Vujačić (2011–2013)
- (Montenegro) Dejan Perović (2009–2011)

== Stadium ==
FK Igalo plays their home games at Stadion Solila. Until the middle of the nineties, football ground in Igalo was among amateur-pitches like neighbouring Stadion Opačica or Stadion Bijela. But, with FK Igalo promotion to the Second Yugoslav League, on old ground location was built new stadium with one terrace and numerous pitches around the main ground.
During the winter months, because of good climate and accommodation, the stadium is used for exhibition matches, tournaments, trainings and preparations of many football teams from the region (Montenegro, Serbia, North Macedonia, Albania, Kosovo, Bosnia and Herzegovina and Croatia).

== See also ==
- Stadion Solila
- Igalo
- Herceg Novi
- Montenegrin Third League
- Montenegrin clubs in Yugoslav football competitions (1946–2006)
