= Rade Petrović =

Montenegrin footballer

Personal information
- Full name: Rade Petrović-Njegoš
- Date of birth: 21 September 1982 (age 44)
- Place of birth: Titograd, SFR Yugoslavia
- Height: 1.87 m (6 ft 1 1/2 in)
- Position: Midfielder

Senior career*
Years	Team	Apps	(Gls)
1998–2000	Budućnost Podgorica	1	(0)
2000–2002	Grbalj		
2002	Bokelj		
2002–2005	Kom	57	(7)
2005	Jedinstvo Bijelo Polje	15	(0)
2006	Carlstad United	24	(5)
2006–2008	Borac Čačak	32	(2)
2008	Terek Grozny	3	(0)
2009	Grbalj	13	(2)
2009–2010	Kom	11	(2)
2010–2012	Mladost Podgorica	46	(1)

International career
2007	Montenegro	1	(0)

Managerial career
- 2021–2022: Rudar Pljevlja
- 2022–2023: Jezero
- * Club domestic league appearances and goals

Rade Petrović-Njegoš (Serbian Cyrillic: Раде Петровић-Његош, born 21 September 1982) is a Montenegrin football manager and former player who played as a midfielder.

== Club career ==
He spent most of his career playing in Montenegrin clubs, namely FK Budućnost Podgorica, OFK Grbalj, FK Bokelj, FK Kom and FK Jedinstvo Bijelo Polje. The exception was between late 2005 and 2009 when he played in Sweden with Carlstad United BK, Serbia with FK Borac Čačak and Russian FC Terek Grozny.

== International career ==
Petrović made his debut for Montenegro in a June 2007 Kirin Cup match against Colombia, coming on as a late sub for Mirko Raičević. It remained his sole international appearance.

== Personal life ==
He is a member of the Petrović-Njegoš dynasty through descent as the descendant of Prince Rade (the brother of Bishop Danilo).
