= Podgorica City Stadium =

Stadium in Podogorica, Montenegro

Coordinates: 42°26′41″N 19°15′52″E

- Stadion pod Goricom
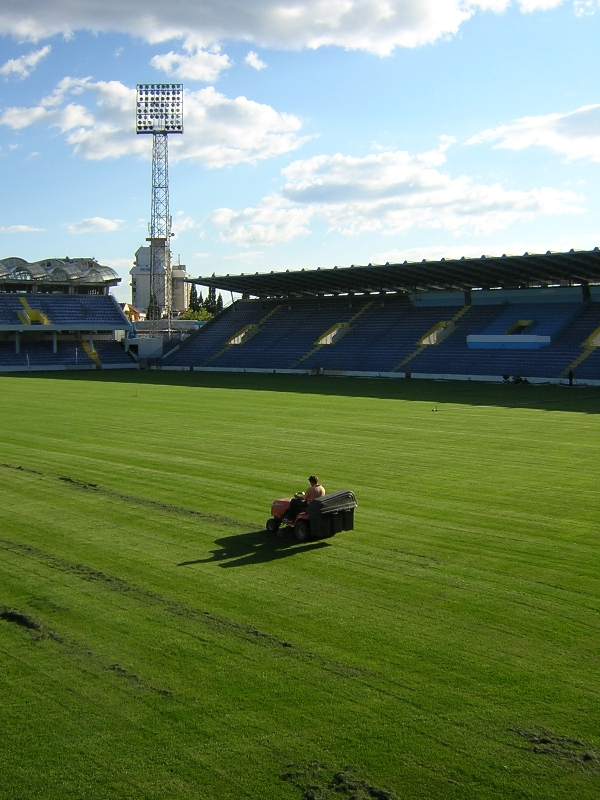
- The interior of the Podgorica City Stadium
- Interactive map of Podgorica City Stadium
- Location: Vaka Đurovića Street, Podgorica, Montenegro
- Owner: City of Podgorica
- Operator: Football Association of Montenegro, Budućnost
- Capacity: 11,080
- Surface: Grass
- Record attendance: 20,000 (Budućnost - Hajduk Split, 1975)
- Field size: 105 x 70 metres

Construction
- Opened: 1945
- Renovated: 2004–2006

Tenants
- FK Budućnost Podgorica (1945–present); OFK Titograd (1953–1997); Montenegro national football team (2007–present)

Podgorica City Stadium (Montenegrin: Stadion pod Goricom, Стадион под Горицом) is an all-seater multi-purpose stadium in Podgorica, Montenegro. Its seating capacity changed over the years due to several renovations, as of 2019 it has 11,080 seats. The stadium is the home ground of the Montenegro national team and Budućnost.

== History ==
Podgorica City Stadium was built in 1945, following World War II. Before the war, Budućnost and other clubs from Podgorica played their matches in a field near that location.

The stadium's original capacity was around 5,000 spectators. The stadium burned down completely in 1952, but was later rebuilt, with a new capacity of about 17,000 seats. The new stadium has four stands—west, east, south and north.

In 1989, floodlights were installed in the City Stadium in Podgorica (then known as Titograd). During the 1980s, the main stand (west) was reconstructed. The new stand has a seating capacity of 6,000 and a modern roof.

After the breakup of SFR Yugoslavia, the stadium underwent additional construction work. The east stand was torn down, and a new north stand was built. Capacity was reduced to 12,000.

On 27 March 2015, the stadium was the site of an abandoned match when the UEFA Euro 2016 qualifier between Montenegro and Russia was dismissed by the referees to ensure the safety of the players. Russian goalkeeper Igor Akinfeev had been struck in the head by a flare and was sent to a hospital as a result. Russia was awarded a 3-0 result by UEFA as a result of the match abandonment.

The north stand is the home of Budućnost fans, the popular Varvari (Barbarians). Varvari often account for a large percentage of the attendance at games featuring Budućnost. They are the largest ultras group in Montenegro.

== Stands ==
Since 2006, Podgorica City Stadium has had four stands. From 1992 to 2006, there were three stands (after the old east stand was torn down). Below are the approximate capacities of each stand with technical details.

Stand	Built	Renovated	Levels	Capacity	Sectors	Entrances
West	1945	1952–1953, 1984–1985, 2004	1	4,700	8 (VIP + media)	7
East	1952–53	2006	1	900	8	2
North	1952–53	1992—1993, 2004–2005	2	2,700	8	5
South	1952–53	2004–2005	2	2,700	8	5
Overall				11,000 (rounded)	32	19

== Pitch and floodlights ==
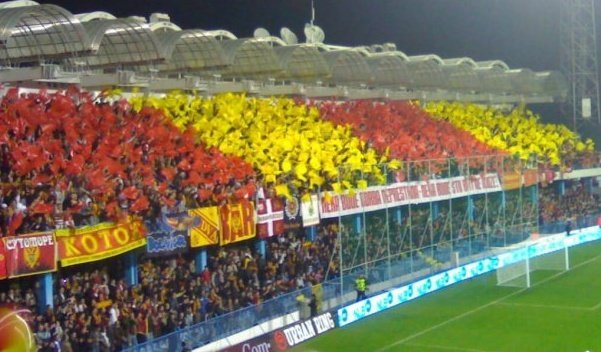
Montenegro national football team game

The pitch measures 105 by 70 meters. The stadium is well known for close distance between pitch and stands. The Pitch was totally renovated in 2014 and today is among the best football pitches in the Balkans.

Floodlights were installed in 1989 for the first nighttime match, Budućnost-Rad (First League, 28 May 1989). Twenty years later, new 1900 lux floodlights were installed.

== Tenants ==
During its history, the Podgorica City Stadium was used by a few clubs and the Football Association of Montenegro.

It is the host stadium for the Montenegro national football team.

Before the independence of Montenegro, the Podgorica City Stadium hosted the final of the Republic Cup of Montenegro. Following this tradition, Podgorica City Stadium is now the host venue of every Montenegrin Cup final.

Clubs which played their host matches at the Podgorica City Stadium are:

- 1945–present: FK Budućnost Podgorica
- 1953–1997: OFK Titograd

== Records ==
- First match: Budućnost-Sutjeska, friendly game, 3 May 1945
- First official match: Budućnost-Arsenal Tivat, Montenegrin Republic League, 20 April 1946
- First match in the First League: Budućnost-Dinamo Zagreb, Yugoslav First League, 25 August 1946
- First match under the floodlights: Budućnost-Rad, Yugoslav First League, 28 May 1989
- First international match: Budućnost-Tirana, friendly game, 7 January 1946
- First official international match: Yugoslavia-Luxembourg, Euro 1972 qualifiers, 27 October 1971
- First match of Montenegrin national team: Montenegro-Hungary, friendly game, 24 March 2007
- Highest attendance: 20,000-Budućnost-Hajduk Split, Yugoslav First League, 27 August 1975

== Highest attendances and notable matches ==
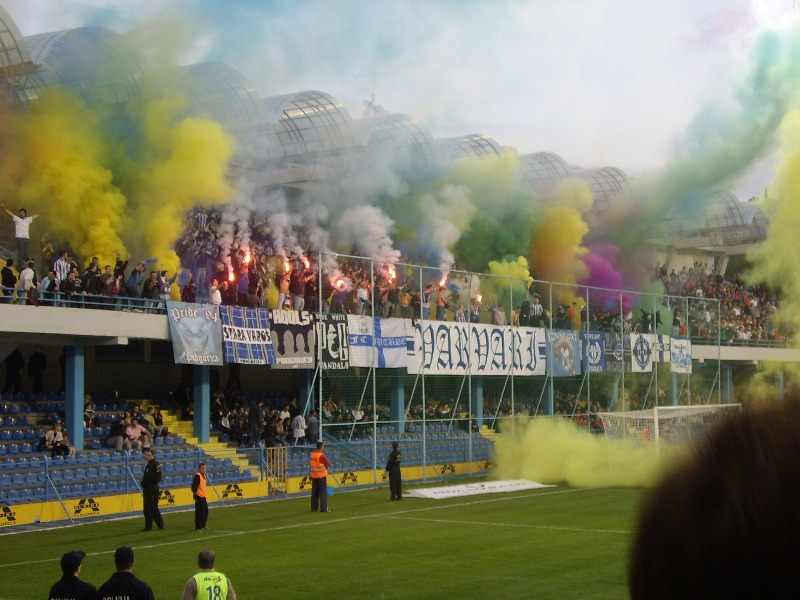
FK Budućnost fans at pod Goricom

Notable matches played at the stadium include:

=== Before 2006 ===
- Yugoslavia–Luxembourg, Euro 1972 qualifiers, 27 October 1971 – att: 10,022
- Budućnost–Hajduk Split, Yugoslav First League, 27 August 1975 – att: 20,000
- Yugoslavia–Wales, Euro 1984 qualifiers, 15 December 1982 – att: 12,090
- Budućnost–Deportivo La Coruña, Intertoto Cup, 9 July 2005 – att: 10,000

=== After 2006 ===
- Montenegro–Hungary, 24 March 2007 – att: 12,000
- Montenegro–Italy, World Cup 2010 qualifiers, 28 March 2009 – att: 11,500
- Montenegro–England, Euro 2012 qualifiers, 7 October 2011 – att: 11,500
- Montenegro–England, World Cup 2014 qualifiers, 26 March 2013 – att: 13,000

== Controversies and accidents ==
=== Budućnost games ===
In 2004, during a First League Budućnost–Partizan match, blocks, construction materials, and similar objects were thrown from the north stand to the pitch and the match was halted for 15 minutes. A year later, the Budućnost–Red Star Belgrade match was suspended for two hours after home supporters (Varvari) threw tear gas on the pitch and, after that, attacked visitors' ultras. In spring 2006, there was crowd violence in a match between Budućnost and Zeta. In the Montenegrin First League, numerous matches of FK Budućnost were suspended due to crowd violence or crowd-invasion to the pitch.

=== Montenegro games ===
In 2011, after the Montenegro-England match, Montenegrin ultras intruded upon the pitch. During the game, missiles and flares were hurled at goalkeeper Joe Hart while he was in front of Ultra Montenegro group. The same thing occurred a year later in the match between Montenegro and Poland.

On 27 March 2015, Montenegro had a home match against Russia. The match was abandoned after 67 minutes due to crowd violence (during the match, the Russian goalkeeper was hit by Dmitri Kombarov, who was hit by an object). The original score was 0–0 and Russia missed a penalty moments before the match was abandoned. Russian goalkeeper Igor Akinfeev was hit by a flare, causing a second 33-minute delay. After that game, barriers were constructed in the upper portions of the stadium to prevent similar incidents in the future.

== See also ==
- FK Budućnost Podgorica
- Montenegrin First League
- Montenegrin derby
