= 2004–05 Second League of Serbia and Montenegro – Group Montenegro =

Second League of Serbia and Montenegro
- Season: 2004–05
- Champions: Jedinstvo
- Promoted: Jedinstvo
- Relegated: Mladost
- Matches played: 180
- Goals scored: 391 (2.17 per match)

2004–05 Second League of Serbia and Montenegro – Group Montenegro was one of the two groups of the Second League of Serbia and Montenegro (Budućnost Podgorica, Sutjeska Nikšić and Zeta competed in the First League of Serbia and Montenegro).

== League table ==
Pos	Team	Pld	W	D	L	GF	GA	GD	Pts	Promotion or relegation
1	Jedinstvo (C, P)	36	19	11	6	57	26	+31	68	Promotion to Serbia and Montenegro SuperLiga
2	Kom	36	16	10	10	54	30	+24	58	
3	Dečić	36	12	19	5	40	27	+13	55	
4	Rudar	36	13	12	11	38	39	−1	51	
5	Petrovac	36	12	9	15	34	38	−4	45	
6	Mogren	36	11	12	13	40	46	−6	45	
7	Grbalj	36	11	10	15	36	50	−14	43	
8	Bokelj	36	10	11	15	30	40	−10	41	
9	Mornar	36	10	9	17	31	46	−15	39	Qualification for relegation play-offs
10	Mladost (R)	36	9	11	16	31	49	−18	38	Relegation to Montenegrin Republic League

Source: rsssf.org
Rules for classification: 1) points; 2) goal difference; 3) number of goals scored.
(C) Champions; (P) Promoted; (R) Relegated

== Results ==
=== First half of season ===
Home \ Away	BOK	GRB	DEČ	JED	KOM	MLA	MOG	MOR	PET	RUD
Bokelj		1–0	0–1	1–1	0–0	2–1	1–1	1–1	1–0	3–0
Grbalj	0–0		0–0	2–4	1–5	0–1	4–1	1–1	2–0	0–0
Dečić	2–1	3–0		1–1	1–1	0–0	2–0	3–0	1–1	0–0
Jedinstvo	0–0	1–1	0–2		4–2	4–0	1–2	3–2	3–0	0–1
Kom	5–0	2–0	2–1	2–0		0–0	1–1	3–0	3–0	5–1
Mladost	2–3	0–1	0–3	0–2	1–1		1–0	2–1	0–0	0–2
Mogren	0–0	1–2	0–0	0–2	1–0	2–0		4–1	1–0	1–1
Mornar	2–0	1–0	0–0	0–0	2–1	3–2	0–2		2–1	0–2
Petrovac	0–1	2–2	4–1	1–0	0–1	1–0	3–2	2–0		4–1
Rudar	1–0	1–1	1–1	0–3	2–1	2–0	2–2	1–0	0–0	

Source: rsssf.org
Legend: Blue = home team win; Yellow = draw; Red = away team win.

=== Second half of season ===
Home \ Away	BOK	GRB	DEČ	JED	KOM	MLA	MOG	MOR	PET	RUD
Bokelj		0–2	0–0	0–0	1–1	2–3	2–0	1–1	1–0	2–1
Grbalj	1–0		1–1	0–1	1–2	4–1	2–3	1–0	0–0	1–0
Dečić	2–1	2–0		0–3	3–0	1–1	2–0	1–1	0–0	0–0
Jedinstvo	2–1	4–1	0–0		1–1	4–1	0–0	1–0	3–1	3–1
Kom	2–0	4–0	1–1	0–1		0–0	1–0	2–1	1–2	2–0
Mladost	1–0	4–1	1–1	1–0	0–1		2–2	1–1	0–0	2–1
Mogren	1–3	1–1	3–1	1–0	1–0	0–0		4–3	1–0	0–0
Mornar	1–0	0–1	1–2	1–1	1–0	1–0	0–0		0–1	1–0
Petrovac	2–1	1–2	0–0	0–1	2–1	1–0	4–3	0–1		1–1
Rudar	3–0	2–0	3–1	1–1	0–0	2–3	2–0	2–1	1–0	

Source: rsssf.org
Legend: Blue = home team win; Yellow = draw; Red = away team win.

== Relegation play-offs ==
The 9th placed team were played against the 2nd placed team of the Montenegrin Republic League in two-legged relegation play-offs after the end of the season.

=== First leg ===
8 June 2005
17:30

Gusinje	1–1	Mornar

Gradski stadion, Gusinje

=== Second leg ===
12 June 2005
17:30

Mornar	1–0	Gusinje

Stadion Topolica, Bar

Mornar remained in the Second League, while Gusinje remained in the Republic League.
