= 2003–04 Second League of Serbia and Montenegro =

Second League of Serbia and Montenegro 2003–04 (Serbian: Druga savezna liga) consisted of four groups of 10 teams. The competition started on 17 August 2003 and the regular season ended on June 13, 2004.

== Changes for next season ==
The next season, second level in Serbia and Montenegro football consisted of two groups. Therefore, as the end of season, Serbian groups (North, East & West) merged into Serbian Second League (Druga liga Srbija), and South group formed the Montenegrin Second League (Druga liga Crna Gora).

== League table ==
=== North ===
Pos	Team	Pld	W	D	L	GF	GA	GD	Pts	Promotion or relegation
1	Radnički Beograd (C, P)	36	27	5	4	77	25	+52	86	Promotion to First League of Serbia and Montenegro
2	Mladost Apatin	36	21	10	5	79	32	+47	73	
3	Novi Sad	36	21	8	7	63	35	+28	71	
4	Bežanija	36	21	5	10	72	49	+23	68	
5	Proleter Zrenjanin	36	19	5	12	58	38	+20	62	
6	Mladost Lukićevo (R)	36	16	8	12	57	41	+16	56	Qualification for relegation play-off
7	Elan (R)	36	9	4	23	33	83	−50	31	Relegation to Serbian League
8	Veternik (R)	36	8	5	23	44	71	−27	29	Relegation to Serbian League
9	Vrbas (R)	36	4	7	25	23	69	−46	19	Relegation to Serbian League
10	Bečej (R)	36	4	3	29	33	96	−63	15	Relegation to Serbian League

Source: rsssf.org
Rules for classification: 1) points; 2) goal difference; 3) number of goals scored.
(C) Champions; (P) Promoted; (R) Relegated

=== East ===
Pos	Team	Pld	W	D	L	GF	GA	GD	Pts	Promotion or relegation
1	Hajduk Beograd (C, P)	36	20	6	10	59	49	+10	66	Promotion to First League of Serbia and Montenegro
2	OFK Niš	36	18	8	10	51	37	+14	62	
3	Radnički Niš	36	17	7	12	62	45	+17	58	
4	Srem	36	17	6	13	59	45	+14	57	
5	Vlasina	36	18	3	15	42	46	−4	57	
6	Mladi Radnik (R)	36	16	7	13	48	36	+12	55	Qualification for relegation play-off
7	FK Beograd (R)	36	16	6	14	62	50	+12	54	Relegation to Serbian League
8	Radnički Pirot (R)	36	16	6	14	54	45	+9	54	Relegation to Serbian League
9	Timok (R)	36	13	6	17	43	52	−9	45	Relegation to Serbian League
10	Morava Ćuprija (R)	36	1	1	34	23	98	−75	4	Relegation to Serbian League

Source: rsssf.org
Rules for classification: 1) points; 2) goal difference; 3) number of goals scored.
(C) Champions; (P) Promoted; (R) Relegated

=== West ===
Pos	Team	Pld	W	D	L	GF	GA	GD	Pts	Promotion or relegation
1	Čukarički (C, P)	36	25	7	4	67	22	+45	82	Promotion to First League of Serbia and Montenegro
2	Rad	36	22	9	5	62	28	+34	75	
3	Jedinstvo Ub	36	16	11	9	51	35	+16	59	
4	Javor Ivanjica	36	17	5	14	55	39	+16	56	
5	Novi Pazar	36	15	11	10	49	43	+6	56	
6	Mačva Šabac	36	14	11	11	47	41	+6	53	Qualification for relegation play-off
7	Šumadija (R)	36	14	9	13	43	42	+1	51	Relegation to Serbian League
8	Metalac G.M. (R)	36	13	6	17	42	42	0	45	Relegation to Serbian League
9	Bane (R)	36	4	5	27	27	71	−44	17	Relegation to Serbian League
10	Loznica (R)	36	1	4	31	13	93	−80	7	Relegation to Serbian League

Source: rsssf.org
Rules for classification: 1) points; 2) goal difference; 3) number of goals scored.
(C) Champions; (P) Promoted; (R) Relegated

=== South (Montenegro) ===
Pos	Team	Pld	W	D	L	GF	GA	GD	Pts	Promotion or relegation
1	Budućnost Podgorica (C, P)	36	29	4	3	97	29	+68	91	Promotion to First League of Serbia and Montenegro
2	Bokelj	36	14	12	10	37	36	+1	54	
3	Grbalj	36	16	5	15	34	38	−4	53	
4	Jedinstvo Bijelo Polje	36	13	11	12	50	49	+1	50	
5	Petrovac	36	12	13	11	42	34	+8	49	
6	Rudar Pljevlja	36	11	10	15	45	48	−3	43	
7	Mladost Podgorica	36	11	10	15	46	57	−11	43	
8	Mogren	36	9	15	12	38	43	−5	42	
9	Mornar	36	10	9	17	31	46	−15	39	Qualification for relegation play-off
10	Čelik Nikšić (R)	36	7	10	19	31	61	−30	31	Relegation to Montenegrin Second League

Source: rsssf.org
Rules for classification: 1) points; 2) goal difference; 3) number of goals scored.
(C) Champions; (P) Promoted; (R) Relegated

== Serbian leagues playoffs ==
Pos	Team	Pld	W	D	L	GF	GA	GD	Pts	Relegation
1	Mačva Šabac	4	2	1	1	5	3	+2	7	
2	Mladost Lukićevo (R)	4	1	2	1	4	4	0	5	Relegation to Serbian League
3	Mladi Radnik (R)	4	1	1	2	4	6	−2	4	Relegation to Serbian League

Source: rsssf.org
Rules for classification: 1) points; 2) goal difference; 3) number of goals scored.
(R) Relegated

== Montenegrin league playoff ==
=== First leg ===
9 June 2004
17:30

Mornar	2–0	Lovćen
Durković 21' (pen.); Đalac 54'

Stadion Topolica, Bar

=== Second leg ===
13 June 2004
17:30

Lovćen	1–0	Mornar

Stadion Obilića Poljana, Cetinje

Mornar qualified to 2004–05 Montenegrin First League, while Lovćen remained a member of Second League.
