= Goran Perišić =

Montenegrin footballer

Personal information
- Full name: Goran Perišić
- Date of birth: 6 December 1976 (age 49)
- Place of birth: Titograd, SFR Yugoslavia
- Height: 1.85 m (6 ft 1 in)
- Position: Defender

Senior career*
Years	Team	Apps	(Gls)
1994–1998	Budućnost	97	(4)
1999–2000	AEL	22	(2)
2000	Olympiacos Volos		
2001	Budućnost	13	(2)
2001	Zabjelo		
2002	Mornar		
2002–2003	Ethnikos Asteras	7	(0)
2003–2004	Kom Podgorica	13	(2)
2004–2010	Budućnost	116	(6)

Managerial career
- 2010–2016: Budućnost Podgorica (assistant)
- 2014: Budućnost Podgorica (caretaker)
- 2016: Mladost Podgorica (assistant)
- 2016–2017: Mladost Podgorica
- * Club domestic league appearances and goals

Goran Perišić (Cyrillic: Горан Пepишић, born 6 December 1976 in Podgorica, former Titograd, SR Montenegro, SFR Yugoslavia) is a Montenegrin retired football defender.

== Club career ==
Perišić began his career with FK Budućnost Podgorica in the First League of Serbia and Montenegro, appearing in over 100 league matches between 1994 and 2001. He had spells in the Greek Beta Ethniki with AEL during the 1999–00 season and Ethnikos Asteras F.C. during the 2002–03 season.
