= Sead Babača =

Montenegrin footballer

Personal information
- Date of birth: 30 November 1981 (age 44)
- Place of birth: Bijelo Polje, SR Montenegro, SFR Yugoslavia
- Height: 1.78 m (5 ft 10 in)
- Position: Midfielder

Senior career*
Years	Team	Apps	(Gls)
2000	OFK Beograd		
2001	Jedinstvo Bijelo Polje		
2001	Proleter Zrenjanin		
2002–2003	Rudar Pljevlja	29	(1)
2003–2005	Jedinstvo Bijelo Polje		
2006	Zemun	20	(1)
2007	Jedinstvo Bijelo Polje	16	(2)
2007–2008	Bokelj	30	(3)
2008–2011	Jedinstvo Bijelo Polje	21+	(4+)
2011	Berane	12	(0)
2012–2013	Jedinstvo Bijelo Polje	11	(0)

Managerial career
- 2015-2016: Jedinstvo Bijelo Polje
- * Club domestic league appearances and goals

Sead Babača (Serbian Cyrillic: Сеад Бабача; born 30 November 1981) is a Montenegrin former professional footballer who played as a midfielder. He played with OFK Beograd, FK Jedinstvo Bijelo Polje, FK Proleter Zrenjanin, FK Rudar Pljevlja, FK Zemun and FK Bokelj.
