= Stadion Solila =

Football stadium in Igalo, Montenegro

Solila Stadium
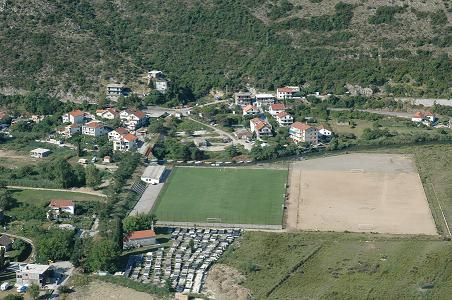
- Interactive map of Solila Stadium
- Location: Igalo, Montenegro
- Coordinates: 42.451830°N 18.501421°E
- Owner: Municipality of Herceg Novi
- Capacity: 1,600 (Football)
- Surface: Grass
- Field size: 115 x 70 meters

Construction
- Renovated: 1995

Tenant
- FK Igalo

Stadion Solila is a football stadium in Igalo, Herceg Novi municipality, Montenegro. It is used mostly for football matches and is the home ground of FK Igalo. The stadium holds 1,600 seats.

== History ==
Until the middle of the 1990s, the football ground in Igalo was among amateur-pitches like neighbouring Stadion Opačica or Stadion Bijela. But, with FK Igalo's promotion to the Second Yugoslav League, a new stadium was built on the old location with one terrace and numerous pitches around the main ground.
During the winter months, because of good climate and accommodation, the stadium is used for exhibition matches, tournaments, trainings and preparations of many football teams from the region (Montenegro, Serbia, North Macedonia, Albania, Kosovo, Bosnia and Herzegovina and Croatia).
Since 1973, Stadion Solila is a host of traditional Mimoza Cup, which hosted numerous popular teams such as Budućnost, Hajduk, Partizan, Crvena zvezda, Željezničar, Luzern and others.

== Pitch ==
The pitch measures 115 x 70 meters. Other pitches have smaller dimensions and don't have terraces.

== Tenants ==
Stadion Solila is home of FK Igalo, a member of the Montenegrin Second League.

== See also ==
- FK Igalo
- Igalo
- Herceg Novi
