= City Stadium (Gusinje) =

Football stadium in Montenegro

Gradski stadion
- Interactive map of Gradski stadion
- Full name: Gradski stadion Gusinje
- Location: Gusinje, Montenegro
- Coordinates: 42.567514°N 19.834500°E
- Owner: Gusinje Municipality
- Operator: Gusinje
- Capacity: 2,000
- Surface: Grass
- Field size: 110 m × 70 m (360 ft × 230 ft)

Construction
- Built: 1994
- Opened: 1996

Tenant
- FK Gusinje (1975–present) OFK Gusinje (2022-present)

City Stadium is a football stadium in Gusinje in Montenegro, and is the home ground of FK Gusinje and OFK Gusinje.

== History ==
The stadium was built from 1994 to 1996, as a part of a Sports center, following the promotion of FK Gusinje to the Montenegrin Republic League. Stadium has one stand with 2,000 seats.
