= Radislav Dragićević =

Montenegrin footballer

Personal information
- Date of birth: 13 September 1971 (age 55)
- Place of birth: Titograd, SFR Yugoslavia
- Height: 1.84 m (6 ft 0 in)
- Position: Midfielder

Team information
- Current team: Lamia (assistant manager)

Senior career*
Years	Team	Apps	(Gls)
- Budućnost Podgorica
1993–1995	Vojvodina	49	(0)
1995–1996	Bečej	1	(0)
1996–1997	Borac Čačak	3	(0)
1997–1998	Budućnost Podgorica	14	(0)
1998–1999	Anagennisi Karditsa	31	(4)
1999–2005	Kallithea	146	(2)
2005–2006	APOP Kinyras	10	(0)
2006–2007	Zakynthos	30	(1)
2007–2008	Kom	32	(1)

Managerial career
- 2009–2012: Budućnost Podgorica (assistant)
- 2011–2015: Montenegro (assistant)
- 2012–2013: Budućnost Podgorica
- 2016: Jedinstvo Bijelo Polje
- 2016: Iskra Danilovgrad
- 2017: Rudar Pljevlja
- 2018: Budućnost Podgorica (assistant)
- 2018: Budućnost Podgorica (caretaker)
- 2020–2021: Kom
- 2021–2023: Arsenal Tivat
- 2023–2024: Mladost DG
- 2024: Arsenal Tivat
- 2024–: Lamia (assistant)
- * Club domestic league appearances and goals

Radislav Dragićević (Cyrillic: Радислав Драгићевић; born 13 September 1971) is a Montenegrin football manager and former player who currently works as assistant manager at Lamia. He played as a midfielder.

== Playing career ==
During the 1990s Dragićević played in FR Yugoslav top league clubs FK Budućnost Podgorica, FK Vojvodina, FK Borac Čačak and FK Bečej, before moving to Greece where he played with Anagennisi Karditsa F.C., Kallithea F.C. and Zakynthos F.C. with the exception of one season in Cyprus with APOP Kinyras FC. In 2012, he returned to Montenegro and signed with FK Budućnost Podgorica.

== Managerial career ==
Dragićević worked as the assistant manager of Budućnost Podgorica from 2009 to June 2012, before he was appointed as the manager for the club on 25 June 2012. At the time, Dragićević was also a part of the staff in the Montenegro national team, which he had been since September 2011. He left Budućnost Podgorica in July 2013.
