= FK Kom =

Montenegrin professional football club based in Zlatica

Kom
- Full name: Fudbalski klub Kom
- Founded: 1935; 91 years ago
- Ground: Stadion Zlatica; Podgorica, Montenegro
- Capacity: 1,200
- Chairman: Savo Barac
- Manager: Dejan Rabrenović
- League: Montenegrin Second League
- 2024–25: Montenegrin Second League, 8th of 9
Home colours	Away colours

FK Kom is a Montenegrin professional football club based in Zlatica, a suburb of Podgorica. Founded in 1958, the club competes in the Montenegrin Second League.

The team is known as a first youth club of famous Montenegrin player Predrag Mijatović.

== History ==
=== Period: 1958–2000 ===
FK Kom was founded in 1958 in Podgorica suburb Zlatica, named after Kom Kučki, the top of Komovi mountain. At the same time, the name was an acronym of the words Komunistička omladina Mosora (Communist Youth of Mosor).

During their first seasons, Kom played at the lowest-tier rank in SFR Yugoslavia - Fourth League - Central region. First success came at the 1969–70 season, when the team won the title of fourth league champion and gained first promotion to the Montenegrin Republic League. After two seasons in the Republic league (third-tier competition), Kom was relegated to lower rank. After 17 consecutive seasons in the Fourth League, FK Kom became a member of the Republic League again in the 1989–90 season. Only two years later, FK Kom won the title of the Montenegrin Republic League champion (1991–92), but didn't succeed to gain a promotion to the Yugoslav Second League, after the playoffs defeat against Jedinstvo Bijelo Polje.

At that time, FK Kom played few successful seasons in the Montenegrin Republic Cup, which gained them participation in national Yugoslav Cup competition. Best result FK Kom made in the 1992-93 Yugoslav Cup, with eliminating Borac Čačak (2–1) in the First round, but were defeated against Zemun (0–1; 0–5) in the Round of 16. In the 1996-97 Yugoslav Cup, FK Kom hosted famous Belgrade-side and former European champion Crvena Zvezda (0–4), in front of 3,000 spectators at Stadion Zlatica.

=== Period: 2000–present ===
Era of significant successes in team's history started with beginning of the 21st century. In the 2001–02 season, FK Kom won the title in the Montenegrin Republic League with 106 goals scored in 34 games. During the season, Kom defeated Županica (17–1), which was a record-high win, not only in the team history, but in the history of the Montenegrin Republic League too. With that success, Kom gained first-ever promotion to the Yugoslav Second League.

In the 2002-03 season, as a member of the Second League, FK Kom performance was notable in Serb-Montenegrin football. On their debut in second-tier competition, Kom won the champion title in the same league with the renown Montenegrin team Budućnost, and strongest rivals like Lovćen, Bokelj, or Mladost. Most surprisingly were invincible games against league main favorite - FK Budućnost (1–0; 0-0; 0-0). So, with 76 points earned, FK Kom unexpectedly gained historical promotion to the First League of Serbia and Montenegro 2003-04.

Once suburban bottom-league member in the 2003–04 season became the sixth club from Montenegro which played in Yugoslav First League since 1946. On their historical debut in top-tier, on 9 August 2003, Kom was defeated against Obilić in Belgrade (1–3). Next week, Kom played first home game - a big local derby against Zeta (1–2). Because their Stadion Zlatica didn't meet the criteria, the match was played at Podgorica City Stadium in front of 6,000 spectators, which is the biggest home attendance in the team's history. On 13 September, Kom hosted former European champion and national title winner Red Star Belgrade (0:2). Biggest sensation during the season, Kom made on 6 March 2004, with the draw against favorited side Partizan (0:0). But, with the score of only 4 wins and 2 draws at 30 games, Kom was relegated to the Second League at the end of the season.

Kom made a comeback to the top tier after the independence of Montenegro. At the 2006–07 Montenegrin First League, the team made few significant results including games against Budućnost (1-1) and Zeta (0-0) and finished in the middle of the table. During that season, member of Kom first-team was former RCD Espanyol star Branko Brnović.

Next year, opened with four invincible games and wins against Budućnost (1–0) and Zeta (2–1), Kom finished at 9th place. The team made similar result in the 2008-09 season.

In the 2009-10 season, Kom finished as a last-placed team, with poor performance of 5 wins and 3 draws in 33 games. Except that, on 29 May 2010, they lost against OFK Grbalj with result of 0–11, which is the biggest defeat in the history of the Montenegrin First League until today. So, after four consecutive seasons in the top-tier, Kom was relegated to the Montenegrin Second League.

Next period, Kom spent mostly in the Second League, with one season (2012–13) in the Montenegrin Third League. New success, Kom made in the 2016–17 season. After hard struggle with FK Ibar, they won the title of the Second League champion. With that result, FK Kom made a come-back to the Montenegrin First League, but only for a single season. From 2018 to 2020, they made three consecutive performances in Montenegrin First League playoffs, but only once made a success, with 2019–20 season spent in the top-tier.

=== First League Record ===
For the first time, FK Kom played in the Yugoslav First League in the 2003–04 season. Below is a list of FK Kom scores in the First League by every single season.

Season	Pos	G	W	D	L	GF	GA
2003–04	16	30	4	2	24	21	67
2006–07	7	33	9	11	13	27	31
2007–08	9	33	9	9	15	29	49
2008–09	8	33	10	7	16	33	43
2009–10	12	33	5	3	25	16	59
2017–18	8	36	11	10	15	36	45
2019–20	9	31	6	11	14	36	45

Season with green background was played in the first league of Serbia and Montenegro, together with Serbian clubs.

== Honours and achievements ==
- Montenegrin Second League – 1
  - Winners (1): 2016–17
  - Runners-up (1): 2018–19
- Second Yugoslav League – 1
  - Winners (1): 2002–03
  - Runners-up (1): 2004–05
- Montenegrin Republic League – 2
  - Winners (2): 1991–92, 2001–02
  - Runners-up (1): 1992–93
- Montenegrin Republic Cup – 1
  - Winners (1): 1991–92

== Players ==
=== Current squad ===
As of 10 February 2025

Note: Flags indicate national team as defined under FIFA eligibility rules; some limited exceptions apply. Players may hold more than one non-FIFA nationality.

No.	Pos.	Nation	Player
1	GK	MNE	Ognjen Milović
2	DF	JPN	Taishi Otsu
3	DF	MNE	Andrija Petričević
4	DF	MNE	Jovan Kecojević
6	DF	MNE	Đorđe Pešukić
7	FW	MNE	Ajman Gligo
8	MF	MNE	Boško Ljumović
9	FW	MNE	Danijel Nikolić
10	FW	MNE	Luka Mihaljević
11	MF	MNE	Andrija Krivokapić
14	MF	MNE	Andrej Božović
15	DF	MNE	Vuk Ajković
16	DF	MNE	Romario Camaj
17	DF	MNE	Predrag Radičković

No.	Pos.	Nation	Player
18	MF	MNE	Igor Radević
19	MF	JPN	Genki Fushimi
20	FW	SRB	Luka Sili
21	MF	MNE	Bojan Bigović
22	FW	MNE	Marko Vujačić
23	MF	JPN	Daigo Urano
24	MF	MNE	Marko Pejović
25	FW	MNE	Denis Ljuljanović
26	FW	MNE	Jovan Mićković
31	MF	MNE	Luka Rmuš
33	DF	MNE	Milun Joković
77	GK	MNE	Lazar Baltić
90	MF	MNE	Marko Burzanović
99	FW	ENG	Leo Jauković

=== Notable players ===
For the list of former and current players with Wikipedia article, please see Category:FK Kom players.

Below is the list of players which, during their career, played for FK Kom and represented their countries at national teams and U-21 teams or foreign players which made an international career.

- (Montenegro) Predrag Mijatović
- (Montenegro) Branko Brnović
- (Montenegro) Goran Perišić
- (Montenegro) Rade Petrović
- (Nigeria) Ikechukwu Ezeh
- (Montenegro) Dejan Vukadinovic

== Historical list of coaches ==
- (Serbia and Montenegro) Milorad Milić (2002 - 2003)
- (Montenegro) Saša Petrović (Jun 2006 - May 2007)
- (Montenegro) Goran Đurović (2007 - 2008)
- (Montenegro) Saša Petrović (Jun 2008 - May 2009)
- (Montenegro) Milija Savović (Jun 2009 - Nov 2009)
- (Montenegro) Duško Globarević (5 Nov 2009 - Mar 2010)
- (Montenegro) Milorad Nedović (23 Mar 2010 - )
- (Montenegro) Nebojša Jovović (2010 - 2011)
- (Montenegro) Milovan Minja Prelević (2011 - 2012)
- (Montenegro) Milan Mešter (2013 - 2014)
- (Montenegro) Nenad Vukčević (Jun 2016 - Mar 2017)
- (Montenegro) Dušan Vlaisavljević (Sep 2017 - Jun 2018)
- (Montenegro) Milovan Minja Prelević (2018)
- (Montenegro) Zeljko Tomasević (Sep 2018 - Oct 2018)
- (North Macedonia) Viktor Trenevski (Oct 2018 - Feb 2020)
- (Montenegro) Radislav Dragićević (Feb 2020 -)

== Stadium ==
Since 2016, FK Kom plays its home games at the new Stadion Zlatica, whose capacity is 1,200 seats. New stadium is built near the old field, on which FK Kom played from 1958 to 2015.

== See also ==
- Montenegrin Second League
- Football in Montenegro
- Montenegrin clubs in Yugoslav football competitions (1946–2006)
- Podgorica
