= Montenegrin Republic Cup (1947–2006) =

Montenegrin football tournament

- Founded: 1947
- Abolished: 2006
- Region: Serbia and Montenegro
- Teams: 16-32
- Last champions: Crvena Stijena Podgorica (2nd title)
- Most championships: Sutjeska Nikšić (14 titles)

The Montenegrin Republic Cup was cup competition for Montenegrin lower-tier clubs in the period while Montenegro was a part of SFR Yugoslavia, FR Yugoslavia and Serbia and Montenegro. Winners and often a finalist of Montenegrin Republic Cup participated in the Yugoslav Cup and Serbia and Montenegro Cup. Competition played from 1947 to 2006, and after independence of Montenegro is succeeded by Montenegrin Cup.

== Format and participants ==
During the existence of SFR Yugoslavia, Montenegrin Republic Cup had 32 participants or more. But, after the 1992, in Republic Cup participated 16 clubs.

Participants of Cup were the clubs which did not play in First Yugoslav league - mostly members of Second League and Montenegrin Republic League, and the winners and finalists of Montenegrin Regional Cups (northern, central, southern).

After Montenegrin independence (2006), the Montenegrin Republic Cup went defunct.

== Winners by seasons ==
Season	Team
1947–48	FK Rudar Pljevlja
1948–49	FK Bokelj Kotor
1949	FK Budućnost Podgorica
1950	FK Lovćen Cetinje
1951	FK Lovćen Cetinje
1952	FK Lovćen Cetinje
1953	FK Sutjeska Nikšić
1954	FK Lovćen Cetinje
1955	FK Budućnost Podgorica
1955–56	FK Budućnost Podgorica
1956–57	FK Budućnost Podgorica
1957–58	FK Sutjeska Nikšić
1958–59	FK Sutjeska Nikšić
1960–61	FK Čelik Nikšić
1961–62	FK Jedinstvo Bijelo Polje
1962–63	FK Sutjeska Nikšić
1963–64	FK Sutjeska Nikšić
1964–65	FK Sutjeska Nikšić
1965–66	OFK Titograd

Season	Team
1966–67	FK Budućnost Podgorica
1967–68	FK Budućnost Podgorica
1968–69	FK Sutjeska Nikšić
1969–70	FK Lovćen Cetinje
1970–71	FK Sutjeska Nikšić
1972–73	FK Lovćen Cetinje
1973–74	FK Bokelj Kotor
1974–75	FK Lovćen Cetinje
1975–76	OFK Titograd
1976–77	FK Sutjeska Nikšić
1977–78	FK Sutjeska Nikšić
1978–79	FK Sutjeska Nikšić
1979–80	FK Sutjeska Nikšić
1980–81	FK Mogren Budva
1981–82	FK Jedinstvo Bijelo Polje
1982–83	OFK Titograd
1983–84	FK Berane
1984–85	FK Lovćen Cetinje
1985–86	FK Tekstilac Bijelo Polje

Season	Team
1986–87	FK Jedinstvo Bijelo Polje
1987–88	FK Lovćen Cetinje
1989–90	FK Sutjeska Nikšić
1990–91	FK Sutjeska Nikšić
1991–92	FK Kom Podgorica
1992–93	FK Jedinstvo Bijelo Polje
1993–94	FK Iskra Danilovgrad
1994–95	FK Mornar Bar
1995–96	FK Kom Podgorica
1996–97	FK Čelik Nikšić
1997–98	OFK Titograd
1998–99	FK Zeta Golubovci
1999–2000	FK Zeta Golubovci
2000–01	FK Rudar Pljevlja
2001–02	FK Lovćen Cetinje
2002–03	OFK Titograd
2003–04	FK Budućnost Podgorica
2004–05	FK Crvena Stijena Podgorica
2005–06	FK Crvena Stijena Podgorica

== See also ==
- Montenegrin Cup
- Montenegrin Republic League
- Montenegrin clubs in Yugoslav football competitions (1946–2006)
- Football in Montenegro
