= FK Gusinje =

- Full name: Fudbalski klub Gusinje
- Nickname(s): Vukovi (wolves)
- Founded: 1933; 92 years ago
- Ground: City Stadium, Gusinje, Montenegro
- Capacity: 2,000
- League: Third League
- 2017/18: Third League

FK Gusinje is a Montenegrin football club based in the town of Gusinje. It was established in 1933. The club currently plays in the Montenegrin Third League.

== History ==
Football club in Gusinje was founded in 1933, under the name Sokolsko društvo Gusinje. At that time, the team didn't play any official games.
In 1946, the team started to play under the name FK Partizan Gusinje. For the first time, they participated in official competition in 1969, as a member of the Montenegrin Fourth League - North. In the 1984–85 season, for the first time in their history, FK Partizan won the title of the Fourth League winner and gained their first ever promotion to the Montenegrin Republic League, where they spent only a single season.
Era of successes came during the nineties. In the 1993–94 season, FK Partizan won their second Fourth League title and made a comeback to the Republic championship. They spent 13 consecutive seasons in the Republic League, and during 1996, the club started to play under the new name - FK Gusinje. Best result at that time, team made in the 2004–05 season, finishing as a runner-up in the Montenegrin Republic League.
Following Montenegrin independence, FK Gusinje became a member of the Montenegrin Second League. After two seasons, they were relegated to the Montenegrin Third League. New promotion to the Second League, FK Gusinje made after the 2008–09 season, but only for one year. Since 2010, until today, FK Gusinje is a member of the Montenegrin Third League.

== Honours and achievements ==
- Montenegrin Republic League – 0
  - runner-up (1): 2004–05
- Montenegrin Fourth League – 2
  - winners (2): 1984–85, 1993–94
- Montenegrin Third League – 1
  - winners (1): 2008–09

== Stadium ==
FK Gusinje plays its home games at City Stadium (Gusinje), near the main road between Gusinje and Plav. The stadium has one stand with an overall capacity of 2,000 seats.

== See also ==
- Gusinje
- Montenegrin Third League
- Montenegrin clubs in Yugoslav football competitions (1946–2006)
