= 2004–05 First League of Serbia and Montenegro =

First League of Serbia and Montenegro
- Season: 2004–05
- Champions: Partizan; 19th domestic title
- Relegated: Radnički Beograd; Čukarički; Sutjeska; Hajduk Beograd
- Champions League: Partizan
- UEFA Cup: Red Star; Zeta; OFK Beograd
- Intertoto Cup: Budućnost; Smederevo
- Matches: 240
- Goals: 624 (2.6 per match)
- Top goalscorer: Marko Pantelić (21)

The 2004–05 First League of Serbia and Montenegro (officially known as the Meridian PrvaLiga for sponsorship reasons) was the third season of the Serbia and Montenegro's top-level football league since its establishment. It was contested by 16 teams (13 from Serbia and 3 from Montenegro), and FK Partizan won the championship.

== Teams ==
Budućnost Banatski Dvor, Napredak Kruševac and Radnički Obrenovac were relegated to the 2004–05 Serbian First League while Kom was relegated to the 2004–05 Montenegrin First League after the last season for finishing last.

The relegated teams were replaced by 2003–04 Second League of Serbia and Montenegro east, west, south and north champions Radnički Beograd, Hajduk Beograd, Budućnost Podgorica and Čukarički Stankom.

Location of teams in the 2004–05 First League

| Club | City | Stadium | Capacity |
|---|---|---|---|
| Partizan | Belgrade | Partizan Stadium | 32,710 |
| Red Star | Belgrade | Red Star Stadium | 55,538 |
| Vojvodina | Novi Sad | Karađorđe Stadium | 17,204 |
| Zemun | Zemun, Belgrade | Zemun Stadium | 10,000 |
| Hajduk Kula | Kula | Stadion Hajduk | 6,000 |
| Obilić | Belgrade | FK Obilić Stadium | 4,500 |
| Železnik | Belgrade | Železnik Stadium | 8,000 |
| OFK Beograd | Karaburma, Belgrade | Omladinski Stadium | 20,000 |
| Smederevo | Smederevo | Smederevo City Stadium | 17,200 |
| Sutjeska | Nikšić | Gradski stadion (Nikšić) | 10,800 |
| Zeta | Golubovci | Stadion Trešnjica | 7,000 |
| Borac | Čačak | Čačak Stadium | 6,000 |
| Radnički Jugopetrol | Novi Beograd | Stadion FK Radnički | 5,000 |
| Hajduk Beograd | Belgrade | Stadion Hajduk Lion | 4,500 |
| Čukarički Stankom | Belgrade | Stadion Čukarički | 7,000 |
| Budućnost | Podgorica | Podgorica City Stadium | 17,000 |

== League table ==
| Pos | Team | Pld | W | D | L | GF | GA | GD | Pts | Qualification or relegation |
|---|---|---|---|---|---|---|---|---|---|---|
| 1 | Partizan (C) | 30 | 25 | 5 | 0 | 81 | 20 | +61 | 80 | Qualification for Champions League second qualifying round |
| 2 | Red Star Belgrade | 30 | 23 | 5 | 2 | 66 | 18 | +48 | 74 | Qualification for UEFA Cup second qualifying round |
| 3 | Zeta | 30 | 18 | 5 | 7 | 52 | 30 | +22 | 59 | Qualification for UEFA Cup second qualifying round |
| 4 | OFK Beograd | 30 | 16 | 2 | 12 | 51 | 36 | +15 | 50 | Qualification for UEFA Cup second qualifying round |
| 5 | Zemun | 30 | 12 | 7 | 11 | 31 | 34 | −3 | 43 | Ineligible for 2005–06 European competitions |
| 6 | Budućnost Podgorica | 30 | 12 | 5 | 13 | 37 | 37 | 0 | 41 | Qualification for Intertoto Cup first round |
| 7 | Hajduk Kula | 30 | 10 | 9 | 11 | 34 | 37 | −3 | 39 | |
| 8 | Vojvodina | 30 | 10 | 8 | 12 | 31 | 37 | −6 | 38 | |
| 9 | Železnik | 30 | 11 | 5 | 14 | 38 | 45 | −7 | 38 | |
| 10 | Smederevo | 30 | 9 | 10 | 11 | 28 | 36 | −8 | 37 | Qualification for Intertoto Cup first round |
| 11 | Obilić | 30 | 10 | 6 | 14 | 35 | 47 | −12 | 36 | |
| 12 | Radnički Beograd (R) | 30 | 10 | 5 | 15 | 33 | 38 | −5 | 35 | Relegation to Serbian League (Note: Radnički Beograd had withdrawn from the competition due to financial problems. Therefore Borac Čačak is stayed in league.) |
| 13 | Borac Čačak | 30 | 9 | 7 | 14 | 34 | 44 | −10 | 34 | Spared from relegation |
| 14 | Čukarički (R) | 30 | 8 | 8 | 14 | 32 | 41 | −9 | 32 | Relegation to Serbian First League |
| 15 | Sutjeska (R) | 30 | 5 | 7 | 18 | 21 | 48 | −27 | 22 | Relegation to Montenegrin First League |
| 16 | Hajduk Beograd (R) | 30 | 2 | 6 | 22 | 20 | 76 | −56 | 12 | Relegation to Serbian League (Note: Hajduk Beograd were relegated to Serbian League due to financial problems.) |

Source: RSSSF.org
Rules for classification: 1) points; 2) goal difference; 3) number of goals scored.
(C) Champions; (R) Relegated

== Results ==
| Home \ Away | BOR | BUD | ČUK | HJB | HAJ | OBI | OFK | PAR | RNB | RSB | SME | SUT | VOJ | ŽEL | ZEM | ZET |
|---|---|---|---|---|---|---|---|---|---|---|---|---|---|---|---|---|
| Borac Čačak | | 0–2 | 1–1 | 2–0 | 0–2 | 0–0 | 0–2 | 1–3 | 1–1 | 0–2 | 1–0 | 5–2 | 3–0 | 1–0 | 0–0 | 0–2 |
| Budućnost Podgorica | 1–2 | | 0–0 | 4–0 | 1–1 | 3–1 | 1–0 | 0–2 | 1–0 | 1–3 | 0–1 | 1–0 | 3–1 | 0–0 | 0–1 | 1–0 |
| Čukarički | 3–2 | 3–1 | | 5–0 | 1–3 | 2–1 | 1–1 | 2–2 | 0–2 | 0–1 | 1–1 | 3–0 | 1–1 | 0–2 | 2–1 | 0–1 |
| Hajduk Beograd | 1–2 | 2–3 | 0–3 | | 2–3 | 1–2 | 2–3 | 0–3 | 0–3 | 0–4 | 0–0 | 3–2 | 0–1 | 0–0 | 2–0 | 1–2 |
| Hajduk Kula | 1–1 | 0–1 | 1–0 | 1–1 | | 0–0 | 0–0 | 0–1 | 2–1 | 0–1 | 0–0 | 0–0 | 2–0 | 3–0 | 0–1 | 3–2 |
| Obilić | 3–2 | 4–2 | 1–0 | 1–0 | 1–3 | | 2–0 | 0–4 | 1–1 | 0–1 | 1–0 | 1–1 | 1–0 | 2–0 | 0–2 | 3–1 |
| OFK Beograd | 2–0 | 1–0 | 2–0 | 6–0 | 4–1 | 2–1 | | 0–2 | 3–2 | 0–1 | 3–0 | 2–0 | 2–0 | 1–0 | 4–0 | 0–1 |
| Partizan | 1–1 | 1–0 | 3–1 | 7–0 | 5–0 | 4–1 | 3–2 | | 1–0 | 0–0 | 4–1 | 3–0 | 1–0 | 4–1 | 3–1 | 3–2 |
| Radnički Beograd | 1–0 | 2–1 | 3–0 | 2–0 | 2–2 | 1–0 | 1–2 | 1–2 | | 0–1 | 0–2 | 0–1 | 1–1 | 1–0 | 0–0 | 3–0 |
| Red Star | 0–1 | 1–2 | 5–0 | 5–0 | 2–1 | 4–1 | 4–2 | 1–1 | 4–0 | | 1–1 | 3–0 | 3–0 | 3–1 | 1–0 | 2–1 |
| Smederevo | 1–4 | 2–1 | 0–0 | 1–1 | 3–1 | 1–1 | 3–0 | 1–3 | 3–0 | 0–2 | | 1–1 | 1–0 | 0–2 | 1–0 | 0–2 |
| Sutjeska | 3–1 | 0–1 | 1–2 | 0–0 | 0–2 | 0–0 | 3–2 | 1–4 | 0–1 | 1–2 | 1–1 | | 1–1 | 1–0 | 1–0 | 0–2 |
| Vojvodina | 1–0 | 2–1 | 1–0 | 1–1 | 1–1 | 4–2 | 0–1 | 1–3 | 2–1 | 1–3 | 2–0 | 3–0 | | 2–0 | 1–0 | 2–2 |
| Železnik | 1–0 | 2–2 | 1–0 | 4–2 | 2–1 | 0–0 | 3–2 | 1–2 | 1–2 | 3–5 | 0–0 | 5–0 | 2–2 | | 1–0 | 1–3 |
| Zemun | 2–2 | 5–3 | 0–0 | 2–1 | 1–0 | 2–0 | 3–2 | 0–5 | 3–1 | 0–0 | 2–0 | 1–0 | 0–0 | 1–1 | | 2–1 |
| Zeta | 4–0 | 0–0 | 2–0 | 5–2 | 3–0 | 2–1 | 2–0 | 1–1 | 2–0 | 1–1 | 2–2 | 2–1 | 1–0 | 1–0 | 2–1 | |

Source: Soccerway
Legend: Blue = home team win; Yellow = draw; Red = away team win.

== Winning squad ==
Champions: FK Partizan
| Goalkeepers | Defenders | Midfielders | Forwards |
|---|---|---|---|
| 12 (Serbia and Montenegro) Nemanja Jovšić (1/0); 25 (Serbia and Montenegro) Ivica Kralj (24/0); 27 (Serbia and Montenegro) Đorđe Pantić (7/0) | 2 (Serbia and Montenegro) Milivoje Ćirković (9/0); 4 (Serbia and Montenegro) Zoran Mirković (23/2); 5 (Bosnia and Herzegovina) Branimir Bajić (4/0); 13 (South Korea) Kim Chi-Woo (8/0); 14 (Serbia and Montenegro) Nenad Đorđević (27/2); 16 (Nigeria) Ifeanyi Emeghara (24/0); 20 (Serbia and Montenegro) Milovan Milović (15/1); 24 (Serbia and Montenegro) Nemanja Rnić (17/2); 3 (Serbia and Montenegro) Dragoljub Jeremić (2/0)* | 1 (Serbia and Montenegro) Simon Vukčević (26/10); 7 (Serbia and Montenegro) Nenad Brnović (25/6); 10 (Serbia and Montenegro) Dragan Ćirić (13/3); 11 (Serbia and Montenegro) Miroslav Radović (19/3); 18 (Serbia and Montenegro) Branimir Petrović (18/1); 21 (Serbia and Montenegro) Ivan Tomić (24/0); 22 (Serbia and Montenegro) Saša Ilić (22/16); 28 (Serbia and Montenegro) Albert Nađ (20/2); 43 (Bosnia and Herzegovina) Milan Srećo (1/0); 44 (Serbia and Montenegro) Stefan Babović (9/1); 47 (Serbia and Montenegro) Milan Smiljanić (2/0); 17 (Serbia and Montenegro) Branislav Atanacković (2/0)* | 8 (Cameroon) Pierre Boya (22/3); 9 (Serbia and Montenegro) Srđan Radonjić (17/10); 15 (Nigeria) Obiora Odita (12/6); 34 (Serbia and Montenegro) Nikola Grubješić (23/11); 23 (Serbia and Montenegro) Bojan Brnović (1/0)*; 50 (Serbia and Montenegro) Nenad Marinković (1/0)* |

- Head coach: (Serbia and Montenegro) Vladimir Vermezović

Note: * Played only in the first part of the championship.

== Top goalscorers ==
| Rank | Player | Club | Goals |
|---|---|---|---|
| 1 | (Serbia and Montenegro) Marko Pantelić | Red Star | 21 |
| 2 | (Serbia and Montenegro) Saša Ilić | Partizan | 16 |
| 2 | (Serbia and Montenegro) Boban Stojanović | Borac Čačak | 16 |
| 4 | (Serbia and Montenegro) Nikola Žigić | Red Star | 15 |
| 5 | (Serbia and Montenegro) Nikola Grubješić | Partizan | 12 |
| 5 | (Serbia and Montenegro) Nikola Trajković | Zeta | 12 |
| 5 | (Serbia and Montenegro) Milan Purović | Budućnost Podgorica | 12 |
| 8 | (Serbia and Montenegro) Dražen Milić | Zeta | 11 |
| 9 | (Serbia and Montenegro) Srđan Radonjić | Partizan | 10 |
| 9 | (Serbia and Montenegro) Simon Vukčević | Partizan | 10 |
| 9 | (Serbia and Montenegro) Milanko Rašković | Zeta | 10 |
| 9 | (Serbia and Montenegro) Dušan Đokić | Obilić/Železnik | 10 |
