= FK Mogren =

Association football club in Montenegro

Mogren
- Full name: Fudbalski klub Mogren
- Nickname: Majstori s mora
- Founded: 1920; 106 years ago
- Dissolved: 2017; 9 years ago
- Ground: Stadion Lugovi
- Capacity: 1,500
- 2015–16: 5th
Home colours	Away colours

FK Mogren was a football club based in Budva, Montenegro. Founded in 1920, it was two times champion of Montenegrin First League and once winner of Montenegrin Cup.

In 2015, following the bankruptcy and debts, FK Mogren was relegated to the lowest-rank competition of football in Montenegro. In March 2017, the club was expelled from the South region of the Third Montenegrin league. Mogren was extiguinshed in 2017. A group of enthusiasts tried to register a new club under the name Mogren 1920, but the Ministry of Sports rejected them. Instead, FK Budva was founded and started with youth sections.

== History ==
=== Period 1920–2006 ===
FK Mogren was founded in 1920 as FK Budva. In the period 1921–1941, the team played in the Montenegrin Football Championship (1922–1940) but without significant successes. After 1945, in the SFR Yugoslavia era, FK Budva participated in Fourth League – South (lowest rank) and won the title on season 1966–67, which meant promotion to the Montenegrin Republic League. Until the end of the 1970s, FK Budva played their seasons only in the Republic League and lower ranks.

For the first time in history, FK Budva won the title in the Montenegrin Republic League on season 1980–81, doubled with the trophy of Montenegrin Republic Cup winner same year. Third league title gave to FK Budva historical promotion to Yugoslav Second League. From 1988 to 1989, FK Budva played in Yugoslav Third League and in 1990, the club was renamed FK Mogren. For the first time, FK Mogren played in the Yugoslav First League in the 1992–93 season. Until 2006, they spent five seasons in the Yugoslav First League. FK Mogren is the only team from Montenegrin seacoast who ever played in the First League of Yugoslavia.

=== Period 2006–2016 ===
After the Montenegrin independence, FK Mogren became a member of the Montenegrin First League, finishing 5th in its inaugural season. In the second season of the league, (2007–08), the club finished in third place on 66 points, losing out on the title on goal difference to Buducnost. The position allowed Mogren to compete in the 2008–09 UEFA Cup, where they played Israeli club Hapoel Ironi Kiryat in the first qualifying round. Despite a 1–1 away draw in the first leg, Mogren went out 4–1 on aggregate. On 7 May 2008, Mogren won their first silverware by defeating Buducnost 6–5 on penalties after a 1–1 draw in the Montenegrin Cup final at the Stadion Pod Goricom in Podgorica.
Mogren won their first league title in 2008–09 with a four-point margin over Buducnost, and qualified for the UEFA Champions League for the first time. Their Champions League campaign in 2009–10 opened with a 6–0 aggregate victory over Hibernians of Malta before a 12–0 aggregate defeat to FC Copenhagen of Denmark in the second qualifying round. In the 2009–10 season, Mogren finished third in the league to qualify for the first qualifying round of the next season's UEFA Europa League, where they won 5–0 on aggregate over UE Santa Coloma of Andorra. The second leg saw Mogren take on Israeli club Maccabi Tel Aviv and lose the first leg 2–0 away. The subsequent 2–1 home victory for Mogren saw them eliminated 3–2 on aggregate. Mogren gained their second league title in 2010–11 on goal difference after both they and Buducnost finished level on 73 points. On 28 May that year, Mogren played in their second Montenegrin Cup final, but were defeated 5–4 on penalties by Rudar after a 2–2 draw. The league triumph allowed Mogren to enter the 2011–12 UEFA Champions League, which saw them eliminated immediately in the second qualifying round after losing both legs to Litex Lovech of Bulgaria. After many successful seasons, at period from 2013 to 2015, FK Mogren, under the debts and crisis, played relegation playoffs in Montenegrin League, and after the 2014–15 season they were automatically relegated to the Third League. Soon after that, following the debts and bankruptcy, FK Mogren was dissolved.

=== First League Record ===
For the first time, FK Mogren played in Yugoslav First League on season 1992–93. Below is a list of FK Mogren scores in First League by every single season.

Season	Pos	G	W	D	L	GF	GA
1992–93	13	36	12	7	17	46	52
1993–94	20	36	10	9	17	34	49
1998–99	15	24	4	8	12	18	42
1999–00	19	40	13	5	22	40	70
2002–03	16	34	5	6	23	33	76
2006–07	5	33	10	12	11	27	27
2007–08	3	33	19	9	5	46	21
2008–09	1	33	23	5	5	62	24
2009–10	3	33	16	9	8	49	34
2010–11	1	33	22	7	4	60	24
2011–12	4	33	15	9	9	54	37
2012–13	10	33	10	7	16	33	42
2013–14	10	33	11	9	13	45	56
2014–15	11	33	5	6	22	26	70

Seasons with green background were played in the first league of Yugoslavia or Serbia and Montenegro, together with Serbian clubs.

=== FK Mogren in European competitions ===
Season	Competition	Round	Club	Home	Away	Agg.
2008-09	2008–09 UEFA Cup	1QR	(Israel) Ironi Kiryat Shmona	0–3	1–1	1–4
2009-10	2009-10 UEFA Champions League	1QR	(Malta) Hibernians	4–0	2–0	6–0
2009-10	2009-10 UEFA Champions League	2QR	(Denmark) Copenhagen	0–6	0–6	0–12
2010-11	2010-11 UEFA Europa League	1QR	(Andorra) UE Santa Coloma	2–0	3–0	5–0
2010-11	2010-11 UEFA Europa League	2QR	(Israel) Maccabi Tel Aviv	2–1	0–2	2–3
2011-12	2011-12 UEFA Champions League	2QR	(Bulgaria) Litex Lovech	1–2	0–3	1–5

== Honours and achievements ==
- Montenegrin First League – 2
  - winners (2): 2008–09, 2010–11
- Montenegrin Cup – 1
  - winners (1): 2007–08
  - runners-up (1): 2010–11
- Second Yugoslav League – 2
  - winners (2): 1997–98, 2001–02
- Montenegrin Republic League – 1
  - winners (1): 1980–81
- Montenegrin Republic Cup – 1
  - winners (1): 1980–81

== Players ==
=== Latest squad ===
Note: Flags indicate national team as defined under FIFA eligibility rules; some limited exceptions apply. Players may hold more than one non-FIFA nationality.

No.	Pos.	Nation	Player
—	GK	MNE	Miodrag Todorović
—	GK	MNE	Nikola Marčelja
—	DF	MNE	Ivan Racković
—	DF	MNE	Radivoje Golubović
—	DF	MNE	Filip Mitrović
—	DF	MNE	Zoran Mikijelj
—	DF	MNE	Jovan Baošić
—	MF	MNE	Ivan Delić
—	MF	MNE	Nikola Šćepanović

No.	Pos.	Nation	Player
—	MF	MNE	Nebojsa Bozovic
—	MF	MNE	Darko Spasic
—	MF	MNE	Zijad Adrović
—	MF	MNE	Danilo Bakić
—	FW	SRB	Stefan Vlaisavljević
—	FW	MNE	Igor Poček
—	FW	MNE	Nikola Balević
—	FW	MNE	Krsto Zvicer

=== Notable players ===
For the list of former and current players with Wikipedia article, please see Category:FK Mogren players.
Below is the list of most-known players which, during their career, played for FK Mogren.

- (Montenegro) Miodrag Bajović
- (Montenegro) Radoslav Batak
- (Montenegro) Zoran Batrović
- (Montenegro) Branko Bošković
- (Montenegro) Damir Čakar
- (Montenegro) Dragan Đukanović
- (Montenegro) Igor Gluščević
- (Bosnia and Herzegovina) Almir Gredić
- (Nigeria) Suleiman Omo
- (Montenegro) Srđan Radonjić
- (Serbia) Predrag Ranđelović
- (Montenegro) Vladimir Vujović
- (Montenegro) Dejan Vukićević
- (Montenegro) Ranko Zirojević

== Historical list of coaches ==
- (Serbia and Montenegro) Mojaš Radonjić
- (Bosnia and Herzegovina) Slobodan Halilović
- (Serbia and Montenegro) Stevan Mojsilović
- (Serbia and Montenegro) Dragan Lacmanović
- (Bosnia and Herzegovina) Slobodan Halilović
- (Montenegro) Dragan Đukanović
- (Montenegro) Miodrag Bajović
- (Montenegro) Dejan Vukićević (August 2007 – April 2010)
- (Serbia) Stevan Mojsilović (2010 – April 2011)
- (Montenegro) Branislav Milačić (April 2011 – June 2015)

== Stadium ==
The club played at Stadion Lugovi, near the main beach in Budva. Stadium capacity is 1,500 seats on two stands and it doesn't meet UEFA standards for European competitions. After they were relegated to the Montenegrin Third League, FK Mogren played most of its matches at Jaz football complex near Budva.

== Sponsors ==
- Official sponsor: Municipality of Budva
- Official kit supplier: Puma

== See also ==
- Budva
- Montenegrin Third League
- Montenegrin clubs in Yugoslav football competitions (1946–2006)
