= FK Jedinstvo Bijelo Polje =

Jedinstvo Bijelo Polje
- Full name: FK Jedinstvo Bijelo Polje
- Short name: JED
- Founded: 1922; 104 years ago
- Ground: Gradski stadion
- Capacity: 4,000
- Chairman: Krunoslav Vuković
- Manager: Vuko Bogavac
- League: Montenegrin First League
- 2024–25: Montenegrin First League, 7th of 10
Home colours	Away colours

Fudbalski klub Jedinstvo (Montenegrin: Фудбалски клуб Јединство), known as Jedinstvo Franca for sponsorship reasons, is football club from Bijelo Polje, Montenegro, currently competing in the Montenegrin First League. The club was established in 1922.

== History ==
FK Jedinstvo (FC United) was founded in 1922, as a first football team in Bijelo Polje. During the first two decades (1922–1941), the team played mostly exhibition matches, without participation in Montenegrin Football Championship.

First significant success after World War II, the team made on season 1949–50, with promotion to the Montenegrin Republic League. At that time, the club played under the name Bratstvo. Soon after that, in the 1955–56 season, FK Jedinstvo played their first-ever season in the Yugoslav Second League, but were relegated after three consecutive seasons.

Most of the sixties, FK Jedinstvo spent in Republic League, until the 1967–68 season. On that year, the team finished third place and gained promotion to the Yugoslav Second League – South Group. After two seasons, they were relegated, but new promotion to second-tier came in 1971, when FK Jedinstvo won the title of the Montenegrin Republic League champion. New season in the Second League, FK Jedinstvo finished as a last-placed team in South group. In the period between 1975 and 1980, FK Jedinstvo won two titles in the Republic League.

Difficult times came at the beginning of the 1980s. On Republic League 1980–81 season, FK Jedinstvo finished 12th place, so, for the first time in their history, the team were relegated to the lowest-rank of domestic football system (Fourth League – North.). They made comeback in the 1982–83 season. In that season, FK Jedinstvo played in the Yugoslav Cup. In the First Round, they hosted one of the most successful teams in the history of Yugoslav football – Dinamo Zagreb in front of 6,000 spectators (0–2). Two years later, FK Jedinstvo were faced with another relegation to the Fourth League. At that time, in Bijelo Polje, they were in the shadow of local-rival FK Tekstilac.
In the 1988–89 season, FK Jedinstvo played in newly established Yugoslav Inter-Republic League (third division), where they made significant success in the 1990–91 season. As a second-placed team, the team gained promotion to the 1991–92 Yugoslav Second League. On their comeback to second-tier, FK Jedinstvo finished 14th place.

After the breakup of SFR Yugoslavia, FK Jedinstvo spent most of the nineties in the second-tier competitions of FR Yugoslavia. In the beginning of the new century, the team from Bijelo Polje were among the best teams in the Second League of Serbia and Montenegro.

Historical success came in the 2004–05 season. FK Jedinstvo won the champion title in Second League – group Montenegro and gained its first-ever promotion to the First League of Serbia and Montenegro.
They started the 2005–06 Serbia and Montenegro SuperLiga season with the game against FK Partizan away (0–2), and first-ever elite division game in Bijelo Polje was held on 27 August 2005 (FK Jedinstvo – FK Voždovac 2–2). FK Jedinstvo finished at the bottom of table, but their home games were among the best attended in the First League. After the Montenegrin independence (2006), FK Jedinstvo became a member of the Montenegrin First League, but relegated to the Second League after the inaugural season. In the period between 2008 and 2018, FK Jedinstvo spent three another years in the First League, but were always relegated at the end of the season as a last-placed team.

=== First League Record ===
For the first time, FK Jedinstvo played in the Yugoslav First League on season 2005–06. Below is a list of FK Jedinstvo scores in the First League by every single season.

Season	Pos	G	W	D	L	GF	GA
2005–06	16	34	3	2	25	18	72
2006–07	11	33	6	13	14	27	51
2008–09	12	33	7	8	18	28	56
2012–13	12	33	9	9	15	31	45
2016–17	12	33	3	5	25	20	69
2022–23	5	36	13	8	15	43	54
2023–24	8	36	8	11	17	43	56
2024–25	7	36	11	10	15	45	58

Season with green background was played in the first league of Serbia and Montenegro, together with Serbian clubs.

== Honours and achievements ==
- Montenegrin Second League – 1
  - winners (2): 2015–16, 2021–22
- Second League of Serbia and Montenegro – 1
  - winners (1): 2004–05
- Montenegrin Republic League – 3
  - winners (3): 1971–72, 1975–76, 1977–78
  - runners-up (5): 1960–61, 1962–63, 1973–74, 1987–88, 1998–99
- Montenegrin Republic Cup – 4
  - winners (4): 1961–62, 1981–82, 1986–87, 1992–93

== Players ==
=== Current squad ===
As of 15 February 2026

Note: Flags indicate national team as defined under FIFA eligibility rules; some limited exceptions apply. Players may hold more than one non-FIFA nationality.

No.	Pos.	Nation	Player
2	DF	MNE	Nihad Balić
4	MF	MNE	Pavle Božović
5	DF	MNE	Momcilo Dulovic
6	DF	MNE	Ognjen Obradović
7	FW	MNE	Alden Škrijelj
8	MF	MNE	Stefan Radojević
9	FW	MNE	Aldin Mušović
10	MF	MNE	Mirza Idrizović
11	FW	MNE	Žarko Korać
14	MF	MNE	Zijad Mahmutović
15	MF	MNE	Arsenije Čepić
17	FW	MNE	Balsa Barović
18	FW	MNE	Velid Škrijelj

No.	Pos.	Nation	Player
19	DF	BIH	Pero Miladinović
20	DF	MNE	Adnan Hajdarpašić
22	MF	MNE	Danis Kolić
23	DF	SRB	Miloš Nikolić
24	DF	MNE	Haris Banda
27	DF	MNE	Lazar Sekularac
30	FW	SRB	Andrej Đurić
32	FW	ARG	Luca Estabio
33	MF	MNE	Andrej Cvijović
44	GK	MNE	Goran Aković
55	DF	MNE	Srđan Šćepanović
56	DF	GRE	Georgios Makrydakis
71	GK	MNE	Rijad Džafić

=== Notable players ===
Below is the list of players who, during their career, played for Jedinstvo and were capped by their respective national teams.

- (Socialist Federal Republic of Yugoslavia) Zoran Batrović
- (Socialist Federal Republic of Yugoslavia) Branislav Drobnjak
- (Serbia and Montenegro) Anto Drobnjak
- (Montenegro) Đorđije Ćetković
- (Montenegro) Meldin Drešković
- (Montenegro) Radomir Đalović
- (Montenegro) Miodrag Džudović
- (Montenegro) Ivan Ivanović
- (Montenegro) Žarko Korać
- (Montenegro) Slobodan Lakićević
- (Montenegro) Rade Petrović
- (Montenegro) Marko Rakonjac
- (Montenegro) Aleksandar Šćekić
- (Kosovo) Fisnik Papuçi
- (Sweden) Emir Kujović
- (Uganda) Eugene Sseppuya

For the list of former and current players with Wikipedia article, please see Category:FK Jedinstvo Bijelo Polje players.

== Historical list of coaches ==
- (Serbia and Montenegro) Sava Kovačević (2005 – Feb 2006)
- (Serbia and Montenegro) Fikret Kurgaš (18 Feb 2006 – Mar 2006)
- (Serbia and Montenegro) Dragan Karišik (21 Mar 2006 – Apr 2006)
- (Serbia and Montenegro) Rade Vešović (9 Apr 2006 – Oct 2006)
- (Montenegro) Siniša Jelić (29 Oct 2006 – Jun 2007)
- (Montenegro) Sava Kovačević (Jul 2007 – Jun 2008)
- (Bosnia and Herzegovina) Slobodan Halilović (Jul 2008 – Jan 2009)
- (Montenegro) Aleksandar Jovanovski (10 Jan 2009 –)
- (Montenegro) Slavoljub Bubanja (Jul 2011 – Aug 2011)
- (Serbia) Jovica Nikolić (29 Aug 2011 – Jun 2012)
- (Montenegro) Sreten Avramović (Jul 2012 – Jun 2013)
- (Serbia) Dušan Jevrić (Jan 2013 – Sep 2013)
- (Serbia) Ljubiša Dmitrović (Jan 2015 – Jun 2015)
- (Montenegro) Sead Babača (Jul 2015 – Jan 2016)
- (Montenegro) Radislav Dragićević (16 Jan 2016 – Jun 2016)
- (Montenegro) Slavoljub Bubanja (Sep 2016 – Nov 2016)
- (Montenegro) Goran Jovanović (Jan 2017 – Jun 2017)
- (Bosnia and Herzegovina) Slobodan Halilović (Mar 2018 –Dec 2020)

== Stadium ==
FK Jedinstvo plays their home games on Gradski stadion. There are two stands with overall capacity of 4,000 seats. At the north side of stadium is situated indoor sports hall 'Nikoljac'.

== See also ==
- Bijelo Polje
- Gradski stadion (Bijelo Polje)
- Montenegrin First League
- Montenegrin clubs in Yugoslav football competitions (1946–2006)
