= Yugoslav Third League =

- Founded: 1950
- Folded: 1950
- Country: SFR Yugoslavia
- Level on pyramid: 3
- Promotion to: Yugoslav Second League
- Relegation to: Yugoslav Republic Leagues

Yugoslav Third League (Croatian: 3. savezna liga; Serbian Cyrillic: 3. савезна лига) was the third tier football league of SFR Yugoslavia. The top clubs were promoted to the second tier, the Yugoslav Second League.

The Yugoslav Third League was played only in season 1950. In the period before and after 1950 the league system was different and a Yugoslav Third League never existed as such.

== League format ==
League was unified, comprising twelve teams.

== Seasons ==
Season	Champion	Second place	Third place	Promoted to Second League
1950	Radnički Beograd	Velež Mostar	Dinamo Pančevo	Radnički, Velež, Dinamo, Zagreb, Proleter, Rabotnički, Rudar Trbovlje

== Yugoslav Inter-Republic League ==
In 1988, Inter-Republic Leagues were introduced as a third tier between Yugoslav Second League and Republic Leagues.

=== Seasons ===
Season		Champion	Second place	Third place	Promoted to Second League
1988–89	West	Rudar Ljubija	Mladost Petrinja	Zagreb	Rudar Ljubija
1988–89	East	Mladost Lučani	FAP	Bor	Mladost Lučani
1988–89	North	Zemun	Rudar Kostolac	Vrbas	Zemun
1988–89	South	Iskra Bugojno	Famos Hrasnica	Neretva Metković	Iskra Bugojno
1989–90	West	Zagreb	Zadar	Mladost Petrinja	Zagreb
1989–90	East	Bor	Novi Pazar	Radnički Kragujevac	Bor
1989–90	North	Radnički Beograd	Bečej	Jedinstvo Brčko	Radnički Beograd
1989–90	South	Mogren	Rudar Kakanj	Famos Hrasnica	Mogren
1990–91	West	Zadar	Jugokeramika Zaprešić	Rudar Ljubija	Rudar Ljubija
1990–91	East	Balkan Stokokomerc	Radnički Kragujevac	Teteks	Balkan, Radnički, Teteks
1990–91	North	Bečej	Vrbas	Hajduk Kula	Bečej, Vrbas, Hajduk
1990–91	South	Čelik Zenica	Jedinstvo Bijelo Polje	Neretva Metković	Čelik, Jedinstvo
1991–92 (Note: The Inter-Republic League in 1991–92 season was played without Croatian and Slovenian clubs.)	West (Note: Competition in the West group was abandoned after 20 rounds due to the outbreak of the Bosnian War. (There is a placing after a 20th round and were indicated with italic letters.))	Travnik	Lokomotiva Mostar	Vitez	—
1991–92	East	Jastrebac Niš	Sileks	Dubočica	—
1991–92	North	Novi Sad	Dinamo Pančevo	Agrounija Inđija	—
1991–92	South	Rudar Pljevlja	Mladost Lučani	Novi Pazar	—
