= 2013–14 Montenegrin Second League =

Montenegrin Second League
- Season: 2013–14
- Champions: Bokelj
- Promoted: Bokelj; Berane
- Relegated: Zora
- Matches: 198
- Goals: 457 (2.31 per match)
- Top goalscorer: Miloš Rašović (Zabjelo) (16 goals)

The 2013–14 Montenegrin Second League (Serbian: Druga Crnogorska Liga / Друга црногорска лига) was the eighth season of the competition as the second top football league in Montenegro. The league played its first games of the season on August 18, 2013, and its final matches were played on May 31, 2014.

== Format of competition ==
Twelve teams participate in this league. The top team directly qualifies for the Montenegrin First League while the second and third teams contest in a two matches playoff against the 11th and 12th team from the First League. The two bottom-placed teams are relegated to the Third League, to be replaced by the two winners of the Third League promotion play-off.

== Teams ==
Locations of the 2013–14 teams

The following 12 clubs competed in this season.

Club	City	Finishing in 2012–13	Stadium
Arsenal	Tivat	10th	Stadion u Parku (4,000)
Berane	Berane	7th	Gradski stadion (11,000)
Bokelj	Kotor	2nd	Stadion pod Vrmcem (5,000)
Bratstvo	Podgorica	4th	Stadion Bratstva (200)
Cetinje	Cetinje	1st in Third League - South	Stadion Obilića Poljana (5,000)
Ibar	Rožaje	8th	Bandžovo brdo (4,000)
Igalo	Igalo	5th	Solila (1,600)
Jedinstvo	Bijelo Polje	12th in First League	Gradski stadion (5,000)
Jezero	Plav	6th	Stadion Pod Racinom (5,000)
Kom	Podgorica	1st in Third League - Center	Zlatica (1,000)
Zabjelo	Podgorica	3rd	Stadion Zabjela (1,000)
Zora	Spuž	9th	Gradski stadion (1,700)

== League table ==
Pos	Team	Pld	W	D	L	GF	GA	GD	Pts	Promotion or relegation
1	Bokelj (C, P)	33	19	9	5	43	12	+31	66	Promotion to the First League
2	Berane (P)	33	17	6	10	56	37	+19	57	Qualification for the promotion play-offs
3	Jezero	33	15	11	7	39	27	+12	56	Qualification for the promotion play-offs
4	Zora (Note: Zora were withdraw from the league due to the financial reasons. So Bratstvo were stayed in the league.) (R)	33	14	9	10	34	35	−1	51	Relegation to the Third League
5	Arsenal	33	13	7	13	37	44	−7	46	
6	Kom	33	13	5	15	38	38	0	44	
7	Cetinje	33	12	6	15	42	53	−11	42	
8	Jedinstvo	33	11	7	15	36	43	−7	40	
9	Igalo	33	10	9	14	35	31	+4	39	
10	Ibar	33	11	6	16	27	42	−15	39	
11	Bratstvo	33	8	13	12	37	42	−5	37	
12	Zabjelo (Note: Zabjelo were stayed in the league due to the withdrawal of Čelik.)	33	7	8	18	33	53	−20	29	

Source: Football Association of Montenegro (in Montenegrin),
Rules for classification: 1) Points; 2) Head-to-head points; 3) Head-to-head goal difference; 4) Head-to-head goals scored; 5) Head-to-head away goals scored; 6) Goal difference; 7) Goals scored; 8) Draw.
(C) Champions; (P) Promoted; (R) Relegated

== Results ==
The schedule consists of three rounds. During the first two rounds, each team played each other once home-and-away for a total of 22 games. The pairings of the third round were then set according to the standings after the first two rounds, giving every team a third game against each opponent for a total of 33 games per team.

=== First and second round ===
Home \ Away	ARS	BER	BOK	BRA	CET	IBA	IGA	JED	JEZ	KOM	ZAB	ZOR
Arsenal		0–3	0–2	4–0	2–1	1–0	1–1	1–0	0–0	2–0	0–0	2–3
Berane	1–1		0–1	2–0	3–0	1–1	1–0	3–0	2–1	1–3	6–0	2–0
Bokelj	2–0	3–1		1–0	4–1	2–0	1–0	4–2	1–2	4–0	0–0	1–1
Bratstvo	0–1	2–3	0–0		2–3	4–1	1–0	0–0	1–0	1–1	1–1	1–0
Cetinje	3–0	3–0	0–4	3–2		2–1	1–0	3–1	4–1	0–0	0–0	1–2
Ibar	1–0	0–3	0–3	2–0	0–2		0–1	0–0	1–3	1–0	3–1	0–0
Igalo	1–2	0–0	0–1	1–1	3–0	0–0		2–1	1–1	2–0	2–0	1–1
Jedinstvo	0–2	2–0	1–1	1–0	1–0	0–1	1–0		1–0	3–0	4–1	0–0
Jezero	2–1	2–2	0–1	1–1	2–2	2–0	1–1	1–1		2–1	1–0	1–0
Kom	1–2	3–0	0–1	1–1	1–1	2–0	2–0	1–0	0–1		2–0	2–0
Zabjelo	1–0	0–2	0–1	1–0	2–0	0–0	5–2	4–1	0–1	0–3		5–0
Zora	0–2	1–0	0–0	2–1	2–0	1–0	2–1	1–0	1–0	1–0	5–2	

Source: Football Association of Montenegro (in Montenegrin)
Legend: Blue = home team win; Yellow = draw; Red = away team win.

=== Third round ===
Home \ Away	ARS	BER	BOK	BRA	CET	IBA	IGA	JED	JEZ	KOM	ZAB	ZOR
Arsenal		1–3	0–2	1–1	4–1		0–4	2–1				
Berane			1–0	2–2	3–2		4–2	1–3	1–0			
Bokelj				0–0	0–0		1–0	0–1	0–0			0–0
Bratstvo						0–2	1–1	4–1		3–2	2–2	
Cetinje				0–1		2–0			0–1	3–2	2–1	1–1
Ibar	5–2	0–3	1–0							1–2	1–0	
Igalo					3–0	2–0		2–0	0–1			0–1
Jedinstvo					4–1	1–2			1–1		3–1	1–1
Jezero	3–0			1–1		1–1				2–0	2–0	2–1
Kom	1–1	1–0	1–0				0–2	3–0				
Zabjelo	1–2	1–1	0–2				0–0			3–1		
Zora	0–0	2–1		1–3		1–2				0–2	3–1	

Source: Football Association of Montenegro (in Montenegrin)
Legend: Blue = home team win; Yellow = draw; Red = away team win.

== Promotion play-offs ==
The 3rd-placed team (against the 10th-placed team of the First League) and the runners-up (against the 11th-placed team of the First League) will both compete in two-legged promotion play-offs after the end of the season.

=== Summary ===
Team 1	Agg.	Team 2	1st leg	2nd leg
Jezero	1–6	Mogren	1–2	0–4
Mornar	1–2	Berane	1–0	0–2

=== Matches ===
4 June 2014
17:30 CEST

Jezero	1–2	Mogren
Čekić 41' (pen.)	Report	Radišić 18'; Rudović 38'

Stadion Pod Racinom, Plav
Attendance: 1,000
Referee: Aleksandar Marković
8 June 2014
17:30 CEST

Mogren	4–0	Jezero
Marković 32'; Rudović 38'; Đurišić 53'; Radišić 84'	Report

Stadion Lugovi, Budva
Attendance: 500
Referee: Pavle Radovanović

Mogren won 6–1 on aggregate.

4 June 2014
17:30 CEST

Mornar	1–0	Berane
V. Vujačić 90+4'	Report

Stadion Topolica, Bar
Attendance: 1,200
Referee: Miloš Savović
8 June 2014
17:30 CEST

Berane	2–0	Mornar
Huremović 48'; Dulović 84'	Report

Gradski stadion, Berane
Attendance: 5,000
Referee: Jovan Kaluđerović

Berane won 2–1 on aggregate.

== Top scorers ==
Rank	Scorer	Club	Goals
1	(Montenegro) Miloš Rašović	Zabjelo	16
2	(Montenegro) Miloš Nikezić	Bokelj	13
3	(Montenegro) Stefan Kruščić	Jezero	10
3	(Montenegro) Stevan Pavićević	Zora	10
3	(Montenegro) Admir Zejnilović	Berane	10
6	(Montenegro) Demir Mekić	Jedinstvo	9
6	(Montenegro) Dragan Nikolić	Arsenal	9
8	(Montenegro) Nemanja Leverda	Arsenal	8
8	(Montenegro) Ivan Maraš	Bratstvo	8
8	(Montenegro) Božo Milić	Jezero	8
8	(Montenegro) Vladan Radunović	Cetinje	8
