= 2021–22 Montenegrin Second League =

Montenegrin Second League
- Season: 2021–22
- Dates: 15 August 2021 – 24 May 2022
- Matches: 180
- Goals: 443 (2.46 per match)
- Top goalscorer: Žarko Korać (Jedinstvo); Igor Vukčević (Kom) (both 17 goals)
- Biggest home win: Bokelj 5–0 Cetinje (1 May 2022)
- Biggest away win: Cetinje 0–8 Jedinstvo (27 April 2022)
- Highest scoring: Cetinje 0–8 Jedinstvo (27 April 2022) Arsenal Tivat 5–3 Grbalj (28 April 2021)

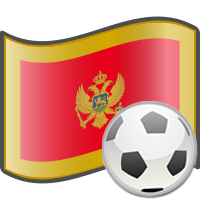
Montenegro soccer icon

The 2021–22 Montenegrin Second League was the 16th season since the establishment of the Montenegrin Second League. The season ran from August 2021 to May 2022. That was the fourth season with 10 participating teams.

== Format of competition ==
A total of 10 teams participated in this edition of the Second League. The new members are Titograd, who was relegated from 2020–21 Montenegrin First League, and winners of Montenegrin Third League playoffs - Cetinje and Mladost DG.

This is the fourth season of Second CFL with 10 participants. At the end of the season, the winner is automatically promoted to Montenegrin First League, while 2nd and 3rd placed teams play promotion play-offs, while 9th and 10th position lead to relegation to the Montenegrin Third League.

== Teams ==
The following 10 clubs compete in this season.

Locations of the 2021–22 teams

Club	City	Finishing in 2020–21	Stadium	Floodlights
Arsenal	Tivat	2nd	Stadion u parku (2,000)	No
Berane	Berane	7th	Berane City Stadium (6,500)	Yes
Bokelj	Kotor	5th	Stadion Pod Vrmcem (1,000)	Yes
Cetinje	Cetinje	1st in Third League - South	Sveti Petar Cetinjski (5,192)	Yes
Grbalj	Radanovići	8th	Stadion Donja Sutvara (1,500)	No
Igalo	Igalo	3rd	Stadion Solila (1,600)	No
Jedinstvo	Bijelo Polje	6th	Gradski Stadion (4,000)	Yes
Kom	Podgorica	4th	Stadion Zlatica (1,200)	Yes
Mladost DG	Podgorica	1st in Third League - Center	DG Arena (4,300)	Yes
OFK Titograd	Podgorica	10th in First League	Mladost Stadium (1,250)	Yes

== League table ==
Pos	Team	Pld	W	D	L	GF	GA	GD	Pts	Promotion or relegation
1	Jedinstvo (C, P)	36	23	9	4	62	15	+47	78	Promotion to the First League
2	Arsenal (P)	36	21	10	5	60	32	+28	73	Qualification for the promotion play-offs
3	Mladost DG	36	17	11	8	51	36	+15	62	Qualification for the promotion play-offs
4	Bokelj	36	16	13	7	45	21	+24	61	
5	Kom	36	18	7	11	54	42	+12	61	
6	Igalo	36	13	8	15	49	39	+10	47	
7	Berane	36	12	6	18	35	55	−20	42	
8	Grbalj	36	6	12	18	33	56	−23	30	
9	OFK Titograd (R)	36	6	5	25	26	62	−36	23	Relegation to the Third League
10	Cetinje (R)	36	6	3	27	26	83	−57	21	Relegation to the Third League

Source: Football Association of Montenegro (in Montenegrin)
Rules for classification: 1) Points; 2) Head-to-head points; 3) Head-to-head goal difference; 3) Head-to-head goals scored; 5) Head-to-head away goals scored; 6) Goal difference; 7) Goals scored; 8) Draw.
(C) Champions; (P) Promoted; (R) Relegated

== Results ==
=== First half of the season ===
Home \ Away	ARS	BER	BOK	CET	GRB	IGA	JED	KOM	MDG	OFK
Arsenal	—	2–1	0–0	2–0	0–0	1–0	2–1	2–2	2–1	5–2
Berane	0–0	—	0–2	1–0	0–1	3–2	0–1	1–0	1–2	2–0
Bokelj	0–0	3–1	—	1–0	2–0	1–0	1–1	1–2	1–1	1–0
Cetinje	0–1	2–0	0–2	—	2–0	0–2	0–4	3–2	0–1	2–1
Grbalj	0–2	2–3	0–0	1–0	—	2–2	0–3	1–2	0–0	3–0
Igalo	0–0	3–0	0–0	3–0	2–1	—	0–1	3–0	1–2	1–0
Jedinstvo	0–0	3–0	1–0	0–0	1–0	3–0	—	1–0	2–1	3–0
Kom	1–1	0–3	0–2	4–1	2–0	0–1	0–1	—	3–1	2–0
Mladost DG	1–2	1–0	2–1	1–0	2–2	1–1	1–1	1–1	—	2–0
OFK Titograd	0–1	1–2	0–3	4–0	1–1	0–3	0–4	0–1	1–0	—

Source: Football Association of Montenegro (in Montenegrin)
Legend: Blue = home team win; Yellow = draw; Red = away team win.

=== Second half of the season ===
Home \ Away	ARS	BER	BOK	CET	GRB	IGA	JED	KOM	MDG	OFK
Arsenal	—	5–1	0–1	3–1	5–3	1–0	1–3	2–0	3–2	2–0
Berane	1–4	—	1–0	5–1	1–1	1–0	0–3	2–2	2–1	1–0
Bokelj	1–3	0–0	—	5–0	1–1	1–1	2–0	0–2	1–1	1–1
Cetinje	1–3	2–0	0–2	—	1–3	0–4	0–8	1–3	1–2	1–0
Grbalj	0–1	1–1	1–2	1–1	—	1–0	1–2	2–1	0–4	0–3
Igalo	4–1	3–0	0–4	1–1	1–1	—	1–2	2–3	0–2	1–0
Jedinstvo	1–1	0–0	0–0	3–1	1–0	1–0	—	0–1	1–1	3–0
Kom	2–1	3–0	1–0	3–1	4–1	2–2	0–3	—	0–0	1–1
Mladost DG	1–0	3–1	1–1	3–2	2–1	1–0	0–0	1–2	—	2–1
OFK Titograd	1–1	1–0	0–2	3–1	1–1	2–5	1–0	0–1	1–3	—

Source: Football Association of Montenegro (in Montenegrin)
Legend: Blue = home team win; Yellow = draw; Red = away team win.

== Promotion play-offs ==
The 3rd-placed team (against the 10th-placed team of the First League) and the runners-up (against the 11th-placed team of the First League) will both compete in two-legged promotion play-offs after the end of the season.

=== Summary ===
Team 1	Agg.	Team 2	1st leg	2nd leg
Mladost DG	3–5	Rudar	1–4	2–1
Arsenal	5–1	Podgorica	4–0	1–1

=== Matches ===
30 May 2022
17:30 CEST

Mladost DG	1–4	Rudar
Škrijelj 37'	Report	Živković 9'; Vujanović 29', 33'; Gašević 48'

DG Arena, Podgorica
Attendance: 150
Referee: Predrag Radovanović
3 June 2022
18:00 CEST

Rudar	1–2	Mladost DG
Vujanović 31'	Report	Stanisavić 40'; Mihaljević 75'

Gradski stadion, Pljevlja
Attendance: 300
Referee: Miloš Bešović

Rudar won 5–3 on aggregate.

30 May 2022
17:30 CEST

Arsenal	4–0	Podgorica
Manojlović 32' (pen.), 75'; Muhović 36'; Došljak 50'	Report

Stadion u Parku, Tivat
Attendance: 1,500
Referee: Savo Vujović
3 June 2022
20:00 CEST

Podgorica	1–1	Arsenal
Bajović 60'	Report	Pepić 76'

DG Arena, Podgorica
Attendance: 350
Referee: Vojin Vojinović

Arsenal won 5–1 on aggregate.

== Top scorers ==
Rank	Scorer	Club	Goals
1	(Montenegro) Žarko Korać	Jedinstvo	17
1	(Montenegro) Igor Vukčević	Kom	17
3	(Montenegro) Siniša Stanisavić	Mladost DG	14
4	(Montenegro) Aldin Mušović	Jedinstvo	11
4	(Montenegro) Miloš Perović	Igalo	11
6	(Montenegro) Ćetko Manojlović	Arsenal	9
7	(Montenegro) Slobodan Babić	Grbalj	9
7	(Montenegro) Ivan Bulatović	Arsenal	9
9	(Montenegro) Bojan Bigović	Igalo	8
9	(Montenegro) Neđeljko Kovinić	Bokelj	8
9	(Montenegro) Jasmin Muhović	Arsenal	8
