= 2006–07 Montenegrin Second League =

Montenegrin Second League
- Season: 2006–07
- Champions: Lovćen
- Promoted: Lovćen; Bokelj
- Relegated: Mornar; Zora
- Matches played: 198
- Goals scored: 450 (2.27 per match)

The 2006–07 Montenegrin Second League (Serbian: Druga Crnogorska Liga / Друга црногорска лига) was the first season of the competition as the second top football league in Montenegro. The league played its first games of the season on August 13, 2006 and its final matches were played on May 27, 2007.

== Format of competition ==
Twelve teams participate in this league. The top team directly qualifies for the Montenegrin First League while the second and third teams contest in a two matches playoff against the 11th and 12th team from the First League. The two bottom-placed teams are relegated to the Third League, to be replaced by the two winners of the Third League promotion play-off.

== Teams ==
Locations of the 2006–07 teams

The following 12 clubs competed in this season.

Club	City	Stadium	Capacity
Arsenal	Tivat	Stadion u Parku	2,000
Bokelj	Kotor	Stadion pod Vrmcem	5,000
Bratstvo Cijevna	Podgorica	Stadion Bratstva	200
Čelik	Nikšić	Stadion Željezare	2,000
Crvena Stijena	Podgorica	Stadion Tološi	700
Gusinje	Gusinje	Gradski stadion	2,000
Ibar	Rožaje	Bandžovo Brdo	4,000
Jezero	Plav	Stadion Pod Racinom	5,000
Lovćen	Cetinje	Stadion Obilića Poljana	5,000
Mornar	Bar	Stadion Topolica	5,000
Zabjelo	Podgorica	Stadion Zabjela	300
Zora	Spuž	Gradski stadion	1,500

== League table ==
Pos	Team	Pld	W	D	L	GF	GA	GD	Pts	Promotion or relegation
1	Lovćen (C, P)	33	21	6	6	50	21	+29	69	Promotion to the First League
2	Bokelj (P)	33	20	6	7	57	24	+33	66	Qualification for the promotion play-offs
3	Ibar	33	19	6	8	42	25	+17	63	Qualification for the promotion play-offs
4	Zabjelo	33	14	8	11	50	40	+10	50	
5	Arsenal	33	11	10	12	40	38	+2	43	
6	Gusinje	33	10	10	13	32	43	−11	40	
7	Bratstvo	33	10	9	14	35	41	−6	39	
8	Crvena Stijena	33	10	9	14	29	37	−8	39	
9	Jezero	33	11	5	17	27	42	−15	38	
10	Čelik	33	11	5	17	31	47	−16	38	
11	Mornar (R)	33	9	8	16	27	40	−13	35	Relegation to the Third League
12	Zora (R)	33	9	5	19	30	52	−22	32	Relegation to the Third League

Rules for classification: 1) Points; 2) Head-to-head points; 3) Head-to-head goal difference; 4) Head-to-head goals scored; 5) Head-to-head away goals scored; 6) Goal difference; 7) Goals scored; 8) Draw.
(C) Champions; (P) Promoted; (R) Relegated

== Results ==
The schedule consists of three rounds. During the first two rounds, each team played each other once home-and-away for a total of 22 games. The pairings of the third round were then set according to the standings after the first two rounds, giving every team a third game against each opponent for a total of 33 games per team.

=== First and second round ===
Home \ Away	ARS	BOK	BRA	CRS	ČEL	GUS	IBA	JEZ	LOV	MOR	ZAB	ZOR
Arsenal		2–1	1–0	0–2	1–1	1–3	1–0	0–0	1–0	3–1	3–1	8–0
Bokelj	2–3		3–0	3–0	2–0	2–1	1–0	4–0	1–1	0–0	6–1	1–0
Bratstvo	3–0	1–1		1–3	2–0	3–0	0–4	1–0	2–2	3–2	0–1	2–2
Crvena Stijena	1–0	0–0	1–1		0–1	3–1	1–0	4–2	0–0	2–3	0–1	2–0
Čelik	0–0	1–2	0–1	1–1		1–1	1–0	0–3 (Note: Match awarded.)	1–5	2–1	0–1	1–0
Gusinje	0–0	0–2	1–0	2–1	1–0		0–0	3–0	1–0	2–0	1–1	2–1
Ibar	0–0	2–1	1–0	2–0	1–0	1–1		2–0	3–2	1–0	0–0	2–1
Jezero	2–0	0–1	2–1	1–0	1–0	2–0	1–3		0–1	1–2	0–1	0–1
Lovćen	1–0	2–1	1–0	1–0	3–0	1–0	1–0	0–0		3–1	1–0	1–0
Mornar	1–1	0–3	2–0	0–0	2–1	0–0	0–1	0–2	1–0		0–0	1–2
Zabjelo	1–1	3–1	0–2	3–0	1–0	4–1	1–2	5–0	1–2	1–1		2–0
Zora	1–0	0–1	0–0	0–1	1–2	3–1	0–1	0–0	0–3	1–0	0–3	

Legend: Blue = home team win; Yellow = draw; Red = away team win.

=== Third round ===
Home \ Away	ARS	BOK	BRA	CRS	ČEL	GUS	IBA	JEZ	LOV	MOR	ZAB	ZOR
Arsenal			3–2			5–1	1–1		0–0	0–1		1–1
Bokelj	3–0			0–0	1–0		3–0	2–0				2–1
Bratstvo		1–4			0–0	3–1		1–0			2–0	
Crvena Stijena	0–3 (Note: Match awarded.)		0–0				1–2		1–4	0–0		
Čelik	2–0			2–1			3–4	2–2	2–1			
Gusinje		0–0		0–0	2–1			0–0			4–4	1–0
Ibar			3–1			2–1			0–1	1–0	1–1	2–0
Jezero	3–0			1–0			1–0		0–3	2–0		
Lovćen		3–1	1–1			1–0				0–1	1–0	4–2
Mornar		1–0	0–0		3–4	1–0					1–2	
Zabjelo	3–1	1–2		1–2	1–2			2–0				3–3
Zora			2–1	1–2	2–0			3–1		2–1		

Legend: Blue = home team win; Yellow = draw; Red = away team win.

== Promotion play-offs ==
The 3rd-placed team (against the 10th-placed team of the First League) and the runners-up (against the 11th-placed team of the First League) will both compete in two-legged promotion play-offs after the end of the season.

=== Summary ===
Team 1	Agg.	Team 2	1st leg	2nd leg
Jedinstvo	2–4	Bokelj	1–4	1–0
Ibar	2–3	Dečić	2–2	0–1

=== Matches ===
2 June 2007
17:30 CEST

Jedinstvo	1–4	Bokelj
Čindrak 59' (pen.)	Report (page 37)	Vujović 9'; Lasić 63', 65'; Jovanović 80'

Gradski stadion, Bijelo Polje
Attendance: 3,000
Referee: Amil Gerina
9 June 2007
17:30 CEST

Bokelj	0–1	Jedinstvo
	Report (page 37)	Babača 43' (pen.)

Stadion pod Vrmcem, Kotor
Attendance: 2,000
Referee: Pavle Radovanović

Jedinstvo won 5–1 on aggregate.

2 June 2007
17:30 CEST

Ibar	2–2	Dečić
Pandurica 31'; B. Škrijelj 64' (pen.)	Report (page 37)	Ljumović 30', 44'

Gradski stadion, Berane
Attendance: 2,000
Referee: Ranko Spasojević
9 June 2007
17:30 CEST

Dečić	1–0	Ibar
Kojašević 87'	Report (page 37)

Stadion Tuško Polje, Tuzi
Attendance: 1,500
Referee: Aleksandar Marković

Dečić won 3–2 on aggregate.
