= 2010–11 Montenegrin Second League =

Montenegrin Second League
- Season: 2010–11
- Champions: Bokelj
- Promoted: Bokelj; Berane
- Relegated: Otrant; Pljevlja
- Matches: 198
- Goals: 465 (2.35 per match)
- Top goalscorer: Vladan Radović (Berane) (13 goals)

The 2010–11 Montenegrin Second League (Serbian: Druga Crnogorska Liga / Друга црногорска лига) is the fifth season since its establishment. The league played its first games of the season on August 14, 2010.

== Format of competition ==
Twelve teams participate in this league. The top team directly qualifies for the Montenegrin First League while the second and third teams contest in a two matches playoff against the 11th and 12th team from the First League. The two bottom-placed teams are relegated to the Third League, to be replaced by the two winners of the Third League promotion play-off.

== Teams ==
Locations of the 2010–11 teams

The following 12 clubs competed in this season.

Club	City	Stadium	Capacity
Berane	Berane	Gradski stadion	11.000
Bokelj	Kotor	Stadion pod Vrmcem	5,000
Bratstvo Cijevna	Podgorica	Stadion Bratstva	1,000
Čelik	Nikšić	Stadion Željezare	2,000
Ibar	Rožaje	Bandžovo Brdo	2,500
Iskra	Danilovgrad	Stadion Braće Velašević	2,000
Jedinstvo	Bijelo Polje	Gradski stadion	4,000
Jezero	Plav	Stadion Pod Racinom	5,000
Kom	Podgorica	Stadion Zlatica	3,000
Otrant	Ulcinj	Stadion Olympic	1,500
Pljevlja	Pljevlja	Stadion pod Golubinjom	10,000
Zabjelo	Podgorica	Stadion Zabjela	1,000

== League table ==
Pos	Team	Pld	W	D	L	GF	GA	GD	Pts	Promotion or relegation
1	Bokelj (C, P)	33	24	5	4	61	22	+39	77	Promotion to the First League
2	Jedinstvo	33	14	11	8	33	28	+5	53	Qualification for promotion play-offs
3	Berane (P)	33	15	6	12	46	32	+14	51	Qualification for promotion play-offs
4	Bratstvo	33	14	6	13	46	34	+12	48	
5	Iskra	33	12	11	10	39	40	−1	47	
6	Kom	33	12	9	12	37	31	+6	45	
7	Ibar	33	10	14	9	33	33	0	44	
8	Čelik	33	11	9	13	37	34	+3	42	
9	Jezero	33	10	10	13	38	57	−19	40	
10	Zabjelo	33	7	13	13	34	48	−14	34	
11	Otrant (R)	33	6	12	15	36	56	−20	30	Relegation to the Third League
12	Pljevlja (R)	33	5	10	18	25	50	−25	25	Relegation to the Third League

Rules for classification: 1) Points; 2) Head-to-head points; 3) Head-to-head goal difference; 4) Head-to-head goals scored; 5) Head-to-head away goals scored; 6) Goal difference; 7) Goals scored; 8) Draw.
(C) Champions; (P) Promoted; (R) Relegated

== Results ==
The schedule consists of three rounds. During the first two rounds, each team played each other once home-and-away for a total of 22 games. The pairings of the third round were then set according to the standings after the first two rounds, giving every team a third game against each opponent for a total of 33 games per team.

=== First and second round ===
Home \ Away	BER	BOK	BRA	ČEL	IBA	ISK	JED	JEZ	KOM	OTR	PLJ	ZAB
Berane		1–2	0–0	4–1	1–4	0–1	0–0	4–0	1–0	2–2	1–1	2–1
Bokelj	1–0		2–0	3–1	2–0	0–0	2–0	2–0	1–1	3–0	2–0	2–1
Bratstvo	1–2	0–2		2–0	0–2	2–1	1–2	8–0	3–0	2–1	3–0	2–2
Čelik	1–0	2–1	2–1		2–0	0–0	2–0	2–0	0–2	1–2	3–1	6–0
Ibar	0–1	1–0	3–0	1–1		0–0	0–1	1–1	0–0	1–2	2–2	2–1
Iskra	1–3	0–2	2–1	0–0	2–1		0–1	2–0	0–2	3–2	1–2	1–1
Jedinstvo	1–0	1–0	0–2	1–0	0–0	1–1		1–3	3–0	1–1	3–0	1–1
Jezero	1–0	0–2	2–1	1–0	2–2	2–2	1–3		0–4	0–1	3–1	1–1
Kom	0–1	1–2	0–1	0–0	4–0	0–2	2–0	3–0		3–3	0–2	0–0
Otrant	1–1	2–3	0–0	0–2	1–2	1–1	1–3	3–0	1–1		0–0	1–1
Pljevlja	0–1	0–2	2–1	0–1	0–0	3–1	0–0	1–1	0–1	0–3		3–2
Zabjelo	2–1	1–1	1–2	1–1	2–0	0–1	1–3	3–2	1–0	1–0	2–1	

Legend: Blue = home team win; Yellow = draw; Red = away team win.

=== Third round ===
Home \ Away	BER	BOK	BRA	ČEL	IBA	ISK	JED	JEZ	KOM	OTR	PLJ	ZAB
Berane			2–0				4–1	3–2	0–1		2–0	4–0
Bokelj	2–0				3–0	2–3	3–0	1–1		3–1		
Bratstvo		0–1		2–0	2–2	1–1		0–0		3–0		
Čelik	1–1	2–3			0–0	0–1		0–3		5–0		
Ibar	1–0					3–1	0–0				2–0	0–0
Iskra	2–1						0–0	1–2	2–3		1–0	3–2
Jedinstvo			1–0	2–0				1–1	0–1		0–0	1–0
Jezero					1–1				2–2	3–1	2–0	1–0
Kom		0–2	0–1	1–0	0–1					3–0		
Otrant	1–3				1–1	2–2	1–1				1–0	
Pljevlja	0–1	1–2	1–3	1–1					1–1			2–2
Zabjelo		2–2	0–1	0–0					1–1	1–0		

Legend: Blue = home team win; Yellow = draw; Red = away team win.

== Promotion play-offs ==
The 3rd-placed team (against the 10th-placed team of the First League) and the runners-up (against the 11th-placed team of the First League) will both compete in two-legged promotion play-offs after the end of the season.

=== Summary ===
Team 1	Agg.	Team 2	1st leg	2nd leg
Jedinstvo	0–1	Sutjeska	0–0	0–1
Mornar	1–1 (a)	Berane	1–1	0–0

=== Matches ===
1 June 2011
17:30 CEST

Jedinstvo	0–0	Sutjeska
	Report (page 37)

Gradski stadion, Bijelo Polje
Attendance: 2,500
Referee: Jovan Kaluđerović
5 June 2011
17:30 CEST

Sutjeska	1–0	Jedinstvo
Dževerdanović 90'	Report (page 37)

Stadion kraj Bistrice, Nikšić
Attendance: 3,000
Referee: Nikola Dabanović

Sutjeska won 1–0 on aggregate.

1 June 2011
17:30 CEST

Mornar	1–1	Berane
Kasapi 70'	Report (page 37)	Radović 57'

Stadion Topolica, Bar
Attendance: 1,000
Referee: Aleksandar Marković
5 June 2011
17:30 CEST

Berane	0–0	Mornar
	Report (page 37)

Gradski stadion, Berane
Attendance: 3,500
Referee: Jovan Kaluđerović

1–1 on aggregate. Berane won on away goals.
