= 2017–18 Montenegrin Second League =

Montenegrin Second League
- Season: 2017–18
- Dates: 13 August 2017 – 26 May 2018
- Champions: Mornar
- Promoted: Mornar; Lovćen
- Relegated: Ibar; Cetinje; Čelik
- Matches: 198
- Goals: 488 (2.46 per match)
- Top goalscorer: Elie Matuoke (Mladost Lješkopolje) (23 goals)
- Biggest home win: Bokelj 10–0 Čelik (8 April 2018)
- Biggest away win: Jedinstvo 0–5 Otrant-Olympic (15 October 2017) Čelik 0–5 Mladost Lješkopolje (26 November 2017)
- Highest scoring: Bokelj 10–0 Čelik (8 April 2018)

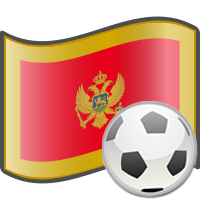
Icon for soccer from Montenegro

The 2017–18 Montenegrin Second League was the 12th season since the establishment of the Montenegrin Second League. The season ran from 13 August 2017 to 26 May 2018.

== Format of competition ==
A total of 12 teams participated in this edition of the Second League. The new members were FK Lovćen, FK Jedinstvo and FK Bokelj who was relegated from 2016–17 Montenegrin First League, and winners of Montenegrin Third League playoffs - OFK Mladost Lješkopolje.
This was the last season of Second CFL with 12 participants, as the participants would be reduced to 10. At the end of the season, three worst-placed teams on the table would be directly relegated to the Montenegrin Third League.

== Teams ==
Locations of the 2017–18 teams

The following 12 clubs competed in this season.

Club	City	Finishing in 2016–17	Stadium
Berane	Berane	6th	Gradski stadion (11,000)
Bokelj	Kotor	10th in First League	Stadion pod Vrmcem (2,000)
Cetinje	Cetinje	7th	Sveti Petar Cetinjski (5,192)
Čelik	Nikšić	9th	Stadion Željezare (2,000)
Ibar	Rožaje	2nd	Bandžovo brdo (4,000)
Igalo	Igalo	8th	Solila (1,000)
Jedinstvo	Bijelo Polje	12th in First League	Gradski Stadion (5,000)
Jezero	Plav	5th	Stadion pod Racinom (5,000)
Lovćen	Cetinje	11th in First League	Sveti Petar Cetinjski (5,192)
Mladost	Lješkopolje	1st in Third League - Center	Stari Ribnjak Stadium (1,200)
Mornar	Bar	4th	Topolica (2,500)
Otrant-Olympic	Ulcinj	3rd	Stadion Olympic (1,500)

== League table ==
Pos	Team	Pld	W	D	L	GF	GA	GD	Pts	Promotion or relegation
1	Mornar (C, P)	33	19	11	3	48	11	+37	68	Promotion to the First League
2	Mladost Lješkopolje	33	18	7	8	59	33	+26	61 (Note: Mladost Lješkopolje were ahead of Lovćen on head-to-head points: Mladost 9 pts, Lovćen 0 pts.)	Qualification for the promotion play-offs
3	Lovćen (O, P)	33	17	10	6	56	31	+25	61	Qualification for the promotion play-offs
4	Bokelj	33	15	11	7	49	20	+29	56	
5	Otrant-Olympic (Note: Otrant were deducted 3 points.)	33	15	9	9	55	32	+23	51 (Note: Otrant were ahead of Berane on head-to-head points: Otrant 7 pts, Berane 1 pt.)	
6	Berane	33	15	6	12	57	42	+15	51	
7	Jedinstvo	33	14	4	15	34	39	−5	46	
8	Igalo	33	12	9	12	38	33	+5	45	
9	Jezero	33	12	8	13	34	38	−4	44	
10	Ibar (R)	33	11	9	13	31	36	−5	42	Relegation to the Third League
11	Cetinje (R)	33	3	3	27	13	79	−66	12	Relegation to the Third League
12	Čelik (Note: Čelik were deducted 1 point.) (R)	33	2	3	28	14	94	−80	8	Relegation to the Third League

Source: Football Association of Montenegro (in Montenegrin)
Rules for classification: 1) Points; 2) Head-to-head points; 3) Head-to-head goal difference; 4) Head-to-head goals scored; 5) Head-to-head away goals scored; 6) Goal difference; 7) Goals scored; 8) Draw.
(C) Champions; (O) Play-off winners; (P) Promoted; (R) Relegated

== Results ==
The schedule consists of three rounds. During the first two rounds, each team played each other once home-and-away for a total of 22 games. The pairings of the third round were then set according to the standings after the first two rounds, giving every team a third game against each opponent for a total of 33 games per team.

=== First and second round ===
Home \ Away	BER	BOK	CET	ČEL	IBA	IGA	JED	JEZ	LOV	MLA	MOR	OTR
Berane	—	0–2	1–0	4–2	3–1	3–2	1–0	3–1	0–1	1–1	1–3	1–2
Bokelj	1–4	—	4–2	2–0	0–0	0–1	1–1	4–0	1–2	2–2	2–0	3–1
Cetinje	0–4	0–1	—	1–0	1–3	1–0	0–1	2–2	1–3	1–2	0–5	0–2
Čelik	0–3	0–0	2–0	—	1–2	2–3	0–1	0–2	0–3	0–5	0–4	1–1
Ibar	0–2	0–0	2–0	3–0	—	0–0	1–1	1–0	0–0	0–1	0–0	0–0
Igalo	0–0	1–0	4–0	3–1	0–0	—	1–0	0–1	1–1	0–0	0–1	1–2
Jedinstvo	0–2	0–3	2–0	1–0	1–0	0–1	—	1–0	0–3	1–4	0–2	0–5
Jezero	0–2	0–1	0–0	1–0	2–0	1–0	0–2	—	2–2	1–0	1–0	3–2
Lovćen	2–2	0–0	1–0	2–1	3–1	4–0	0–0	2–0	—	0–3	0–0	1–2
Mladost Lješkopolje	0–3	0–0	4–0	4–0	1–2	5–0	0–3	3–2	3–1	—	2–0	2–1
Mornar	1–0	0–0	3–0	0–0	4–0	3–1	1–0	0–0	3–0	2–0	—	3–2
Otrant-Olympic	3–1	0–0	0–0	6–1	2–0	2–1	1–0	0–0	0–1	1–1	0–0	—

Source: Football Association of Montenegro (in Montenegrin)
Legend: Blue = home team win; Yellow = draw; Red = away team win.

=== Third round ===
Home \ Away	BER	BOK	CET	ČEL	IBA	IGA	JED	JEZ	LOV	MLA	MOR	OTR
Berane	—	0–1	2–0	4–1	1–1	—	—	2–2	—	1–2	—	—
Bokelj	—	—	—	10–0	—	1–1	1–1	—	—	0–1	0–1	1–0
Cetinje	—	0–1	—	—	1–4	—	—	0–4	—	1–0	0–3	—
Čelik	—	—	1–0	—	0–4	1–3	0–4	0–3	—	—	—	—
Ibar	—	0–3	—	—	—	1–0	—	1–0	—	1–2	0–1	—
Igalo	1–0	—	5–0	—	—	—	4–0	—	1–1	—	—	3–1
Jedinstvo	3–1	—	4–1	—	2–3	—	—	—	2–0	—	—	0–2
Jezero	—	0–4	—	—	—	1–0	0–2	—	—	0–1	0–0	—
Lovćen	4–2	2–0	6–1	5–0	2–0	—	—	2–2	—	—	—	—
Mladost Lješkopolje	—	—	—	4–0	—	0–0	0–1	—	3–1	—	1–1	2–6
Mornar	3–1	—	—	3–0	—	0–0	1–0	—	0–0	—	—	0–0
Otrant-Olympic	2–2	—	4–0	3–0	1–0	—	—	1–3	0–1	—	—	—

Source: Football Association of Montenegro (in Montenegrin)
Legend: Blue = home team win; Yellow = draw; Red = away team win.

== Promotion play-offs ==
The 3rd-placed team (against the 10th-placed team of the First League) and the runners-up (against the 11th-placed team of the First League) will both compete in two-legged promotion play-offs after the end of the season.

=== Summary ===
Team 1	Agg.	Team 2	1st leg	2nd leg
Kom	1–2	Lovćen	0–0	1–2
Mladost Lješkopolje	2–5	Petrovac	0–3	2–2

=== Matches ===
30 May 2018
17:30 CEST

Kom	0–0	Lovćen
	Report

Stadion Zlatica, Podgorica
Attendance: 1,000
Referee: Miloš Novović
3 June 2018
17:30 CEST

Lovćen	2–1	Kom
Marković 23'; Đurović 56' (pen.)	Report	Đukić 42'

Stadion Trešnjica, Golubovci
Attendance: 800
Referee: Mileta Šćepanović

Lovćen won 2–1 on aggregate.

30 May 2018
17:30 CEST

Mladost Lješkopolje	0–3	Petrovac
	Report	Krivokapić 10' (o.g.); Muharemović 38'; Boričić 87'

Stari Ribnjak Stadium, Podgorica
Attendance: 1,000
Referee: Nikola Dabanović
3 June 2018
17:30 CEST

Petrovac	2–2	Mladost Lješkopolje
Kalezić 42'; Đorđević 90+3'	Report	Muhović 53', 56'

Stadion pod Malim brdom, Petrovac
Attendance: 250
Referee: Nikola Vođević

Petrovac won 5–2 on aggregate.

== Top scorers ==
Rank	Scorer	Club	Goals
1	(Cameroon) Elie Matuoke	Mladost Lješkopolje	23
2	(Montenegro) Mehmed Divanović	Otrant-Olympic	14
2	(Montenegro) Dejan Pepić	Bokelj	14
4	(Montenegro) Denis Džanović	Otrant-Olympic	12
4	(Montenegro) Ivan Jablan	Lovćen	12
6	(Montenegro) Ivan Asanović	Berane	11
6	(Montenegro) Denis Banda	Jedinstvo	11
6	(Montenegro) Milivoje Mrdak	Jedinstvo	11
6	(Montenegro) Goran Vujović	Lovćen	11
10	(Montenegro) Ivan Bulatović	Bokelj	10
10	(Montenegro) Filip Kalačević	Mornar	10
