= 2019–20 Montenegrin Second League =

Montenegrin Second League
- Season: 2019–20
- Dates: 11 August 2019 – 4 July 2020
- Matches played: 150
- Goals scored: 391 (2.61 per match)
- Top goalscorer: Siniša Stanisavić (Ibar) (14 goals)
- Biggest home win: Jezero 4–0 Arsenal (29 September 2019) Bokelj 5–1 Drezga (13 October 2019)
- Biggest away win: Lovćen 0–4 Jezero (8 September 2019) Drezga 0–4 Lovćen (6 October 2019) Otrant-Olympic 0–4 Bokelj (17 November 2019)
- Highest scoring: Arsenal 3–3 Dečić (15 September 2019) Bokelj 5–1 Drezga (13 October 2019) Dečić 3–3 Ibar (1 December 2019)
- Longest winning run: Dečić (4 matches)
- Longest unbeaten run: Dečić (13 matches)
- Longest winless run: Otrant-Olympic (9 matches)
- Longest losing run: Otrant-Olympic (6 matches)

The 2019–20 Montenegrin Second League was the 14th season since the establishment of the Montenegrin Second League. The season ran from August 2019 to July 2020. That was the second season with 10 participating teams.

== Format of competition ==
A total of 10 teams participate in this edition of the Second League. The new members are Lovćen and Mornar, who were relegated from 2018–19 Montenegrin First League, and winners of Montenegrin Third League playoffs - Ibar and Drezga.

This was the second season of Second CFL with 10 participants. At the end of the season, the winner is automatically promoted to Montenegrin First League, while 2nd and 3rd placed teams play promotion play-offs, while 9th and 10th position lead to relegation to the Montenegrin Third League.

== Teams ==
The following 10 clubs compete in this season.

Locations of the 2019–20 teams

Club	City	Finishing in 2018–19	Stadium
Arsenal	Tivat	5th	Stadion u parku (2,000)
Bokelj	Kotor	3rd	Stadion pod Vrmcem (1,000)
Dečić	Tuzi	8th	Stadion Tuško Polje (2,000)
Drezga	Podgorica	1st in Third League - Center	Stadion Drezge (200)
Ibar	Rožaje	1st in Third League - North	Bandžovo Brdo Stadium (3,000)
Jedinstvo	Bijelo Polje	6th	Gradski Stadion (4,000)
Jezero	Plav	7th	Stadion Pod Racinom (5,000)
Lovćen	Cetinje	9th in First League	Sveti Petar Cetinjski (5,192)
Mornar	Bar	10th in First League	Stadion Topolica (2,500)
Otrant-Olympic	Ulcinj	4th	Stadion Olympic (1,500)

== League table ==
Pos	Team	Pld	W	D	L	GF	GA	GD	Pts	Promotion or relegation
1	Dečić (C, P)	30	17	10	3	61	33	+28	61	Promotion to the First League
2	Jezero (O, P)	30	15	6	9	38	28	+10	51	Qualification for the promotion play-offs
3	Bokelj	30	14	7	9	45	28	+17	49	Qualification for the promotion play-offs
4	Jedinstvo	30	12	10	8	40	32	+8	46	
5	Ibar	30	11	8	11	41	43	−2	41	
6	Arsenal	30	9	9	12	38	41	−3	36	
7	Mornar	30	8	11	11	36	44	−8	35	
8	Drezga	30	8	9	13	31	47	−16	33	
9	Lovćen (R)	30	6	11	13	31	43	−12	29	Relegation to the Third League
10	Otrant-Olympic (R)	30	7	5	18	30	52	−22	26	Relegation to the Third League

Source: Football Association of Montenegro (in Montenegrin)
Rules for classification: 1) Points; 2) Head-to-head points; 3) Head-to-head goal difference; 3) Head-to-head goals scored; 5) Head-to-head away goals scored; 6) Goal difference; 7) Goals scored; 8) Draw.
(C) Champions; (O) Play-off winners; (P) Promoted; (R) Relegated

== Results ==
=== First half of the season ===
Home \ Away	ARS	BOK	DEČ	DRE	IBA	JED	JEZ	LOV	MOR	OTR
Arsenal	—	1–0	3–3	0–1	4–1	0–1	0–0	2–1	1–1	3–1
Bokelj	0–0	—	3–1	5–1	1–2	1–1	0–1	3–1	0–0	1–0
Dečić	4–1	3–0	—	0–0	3–3	2–2	2–1	2–1	2–0	2–1
Drezga	2–2	2–3	0–1	—	3–1	2–2	2–2	0–4	1–0	0–0
Ibar	2–0	1–1	0–0	2–0	—	2–0	3–1	1–1	2–2	1–2
Jedinstvo	1–0	1–0	1–2	1–0	2–1	—	3–0	0–0	1–1	3–0
Jezero	4–0	0–0	1–2	1–2	1–0	2–0	—	1–1	1–0	2–1
Lovćen	0–3	0–2	1–1	1–2	0–1	2–2	0–4	—	1–1	2–1
Mornar	2–1	1–0	0–2	0–1	1–0	1–3	1–1	3–2	—	2–0
Otrant-Olympic	1–0	0–4	2–2	2–1	1–2	0–1	1–2	0–1	0–0	—

Source: Football Association of Montenegro (in Montenegrin)
Legend: Blue = home team win; Yellow = draw; Red = away team win.

=== Second half of the season ===
Home \ Away	ARS	BOK	DEČ	DRE	IBA	JED	JEZ	LOV	MOR	OTR
Arsenal	—	2–2	3–0	—	1–1	2–1	0–0	0–0	—	—
Bokelj	—	—	—	1–1	2–1	2–0	1–0	0–1	—	4–2
Dečić	—	2–1	—	—	3–3	—	0–0	1–2	4–2	4–0
Drezga	3–1	0–2	0–3	—	—	1–2	—	1–1	—	0–0
Ibar	2–1	—	0–4	5–1	—	—	2–0	—	1–1	3–2
Jedinstvo	1–1	—	2–3	—	0–0	—	0–1	0–0	6–4	—
Jezero	0–1	2–1	—	1–0	—	0–2	—	—	3–2	2–0
Lovćen	—	0–2	1–1	1–3	2–0	—	0–2	—	1–1	—
Mornar	2–1	0–3	—	1–1	2–0	1–3	—	—	—	1–0
Otrant-Olympic	2–3	—	1–1	2–0	—	1–0	—	3–2	4–3	—

Source: Football Association of Montenegro (in Montenegrin)
Legend: Blue = home team win; Yellow = draw; Red = away team win.

== Promotion play-offs ==
The 3rd-placed team (against the 10th-placed team of the First League) and the runners-up (against the 11th-placed team of the First League) will both compete in two-legged promotion play-offs after the end of the season.

=== Summary ===
Team 1	Agg.	Team 2	1st leg	2nd leg
Kom	2–3	Jezero	1–0	1–3
OFK Titograd	1–1 (5–4 p)	Bokelj	0–1	1–0

=== Matches ===
10 July 2020
20:00 CEST

Kom	1–0	Jezero
Vlahović 90+4'	Report

Stadion Zlatica, Podgorica
Referee: Predrag Radovanović
14 July 2020
18:30 CEST

Jezero	3–1	Kom
Radenović 43'; Drešković 71'; Milačić 79'	Report	Golubović 57'

Stadion Pod Racinom, Plav
Referee: Jovan Kaluđerović

Jezero won 3–2 on aggregate.

10 July 2020
21:00 CEST

OFK Titograd	0–1	Bokelj
	Report	Bošković 18'

Mladost Stadium, Podgorica
Referee: Mileta Šćepanović
14 July 2020
18:30 CEST

Bokelj	0–1	OFK Titograd
	Report	Novović 63' (pen.)
Penalties
Stevović (penalty scored); Bakić (penalty scored); Sekulović (penalty scored); Babić (penalty missed); Poček (penalty scored); Marveggio (penalty missed)	4–5	(penalty scored) Novović; (penalty scored) Adrović; (penalty missed) Roganović; (penalty scored) Muzurović; (penalty scored) Bojović; (penalty scored) Banović

Stadion pod Vrmcem, Kotor
Referee: Predrag Radovanović

1–1 on aggregate. OFK Titograd won on penalties.

== Top scorers ==
Rank	Scorer	Club	Goals
1	(Montenegro) Siniša Stanisavić	Ibar	14
2	(Montenegro) Dejan Pepić	Arsenal	13
3	(Montenegro) Dragan Nikolić	Jedinstvo	12
4	(Montenegro) Ivan Knežević	Dečić	11
4	(Montenegro) Igor Poček	Bokelj	11
6	(Montenegro) Dražen Ajković	Jezero	9
6	(Montenegro) Ilir Camaj	Dečić	9
8	(Montenegro) Andjelo Rudović	Dečić	8
9	(Montenegro) Aldin Adžović	Dečić	7
9	(Montenegro) Nikola Bulatović	Mornar	7
9	(Montenegro) Mirza Idrizović	Jedinstvo	7
9	(Montenegro) Marko Kažić	Mornar	7
9	(Argentina) Julián Montenegro	Lovćen	7
9	(Montenegro) Saša Radenović	Jezero	7
