= 2023–24 Montenegrin Second League =

Montenegrin Second League
- Season: 2023–24
- Dates: 12 August 2023 – 29 May 2024
- Champions: Bokelj
- Promoted: Bokelj; Otrant-Olympic
- Relegated: Berane; Internacional
- Matches played: 180
- Goals scored: 480 (2.67 per match)
- Top goalscorer: Vladimir Perišić (22 goals)
- Biggest home win: Podgorica 6–0 Lovćen (20 September 2023); Otrant-Olympic 6–0 Berane (18 May 2024)
- Biggest away win: Internacional 2–9 Kom (18 May 2024)
- Highest scoring: Internacional 2–9 Kom (18 May 2024)

The 2023–24 Montenegrin Second League (also known as 2.CFL) was the 18th season since the establishment of the Montenegrin Second League. The season ran from August 2023 to May 2024. This was the sixth season with 10 participating teams.

== Format of competition ==
A total of 10 teams participate this edition of the Second League. The new members are Iskra, who were relegated from 2022–23 Montenegrin First League, and winners of Montenegrin Third League playoffs - Lovćen and Internacional.

That is the sixth season of 2.CFL with 10 participants. At the end of the season, the winner is automatically promoted to Montenegrin First League, while 2nd and 3rd placed teams play promotion play-offs, while the 9th and 10th position lead to relegation to the Montenegrin Third League.

== Teams ==
The following 10 clubs havecompeted in this season of 2.CFL.

Locations of the 2023–24 teams

Club	City	Finishing in 2022–23	Stadium	Floodlights
Berane	Berane	3rd	Berane City Stadium (6,500)	Yes
Bokelj	Kotor	4th	Stadion Pod Vrmcem (1,000)	Yes
Grbalj	Radanovići	6th	Stadion Donja Sutvara (1,500)	No
Igalo	Igalo	7th	Stadion Solila (1,600)	No
Internacional	Podgorica	1st in Third League – Center	Camp FSCG (1,250)	Yes
Iskra	Danilovgrad	10th in First League	Braća Velašević Stadium (2,500)	Yes
Kom	Podgorica	2nd	Stadion Zlatica (1,200)	Yes
Lovćen	Cetinje	1st in Third League – South	Stadion Sveti Petar Cetinjski (5,192)	Yes
Otrant-Olympic	Ulcinj	8th	Stadion Olympic (1,500)	No
Podgorica	Podgorica	5th	DG Arena (4,300)	Yes

== League table ==
Pos	Team	Pld	W	D	L	GF	GA	GD	Pts	Promotion, qualification or relegation
1	Bokelj (C, P)	36	24	8	4	71	28	+43	80	Promotion to the 2024–25 Montenegrin First League
2	Otrant-Olympic (O, P)	36	23	10	3	64	20	+44	79	Qualification for the Montenegrin First League play-off
3	Podgorica	36	16	9	11	63	51	+12	57	Qualification for the Montenegrin First League play-off
4	Grbalj	36	15	9	12	48	48	0	54	
5	Igalo	36	13	7	16	40	38	+2	46	
6	Iskra	36	12	7	17	36	48	−12	43	
7	Kom	36	12	5	19	52	58	−6	41 (Note: Head-to-head goal difference: Kom +3, Lovćen -3.)	
8	Lovćen	36	10	11	15	36	58	−22	41	
9	Internacional (R)	36	7	11	18	36	61	−25	32	Relegation to the 2024–25 Montenegrin Third League
10	Berane (R)	36	6	7	23	34	70	−36	25	Relegation to the 2024–25 Montenegrin Third League

Source: Football Association of Montenegro (in Montenegrin)
Rules for classification: 1) Points; 2) Head-to-head points; 3) Head-to-head goal difference; 4) Head-to-head goals scored; 5) Goal difference; 6) Goals scored; 7) Draw.
(C) Champions; (O) Play-off winners; (P) Promoted; (R) Relegated

== Results ==
=== First half of the season ===
Home \ Away	BER	BOK	GRB	IGA	INT	ISK	KOM	LOV	OTR	POD
Berane	—	0–1	1–1	0–3	2–2	0–1	3–2	1–2	0–2	3–1
Bokelj	3–2	—	1–1	2–1	4–1	2–0	2–0	3–1	1–1	2–1
Grbalj	4–1	1–2	—	2–1	2–2	1–0	2–0	2–1	1–3	2–2
Igalo	0–2	0–1	2–1	—	2–1	3–1	1–2	1–2	0–2	0–1
Internacional	4–0	1–1	2–1	3–2	—	1–0	2–3	0–1	1–2	0–0
Iskra	1–0	2–1	2–3	0–1	2–0	—	1–4	0–0	3–3	0–1
Kom	2–1	1–1	1–1	0–2	0–0	2–0	—	3–1	0–1	1–1
Lovćen	1–0	1–2	1–2	2–2	1–0	2–2	2–1	—	0–0	1–4
Otrant-Olympic	2–0	1–1	1–1	2–0	1–0	2–3	2–0	0–0	—	2–0
Podgorica	5–1	2–1	3–0	0–0	2–2	2–1	3–1	6–0	2–1	—

Source: Football Association of Montenegro (in Montenegrin)
Legend: Blue = home team win; Yellow = draw; Red = away team win.

=== Second half of the season ===
Home \ Away	BER	BOK	GRB	IGA	INT	ISK	KOM	LOV	OTR	POD
Berane	—	1–2	0–2	0–0	2–2	2–3	2–2	1–2	0–1	1–4
Bokelj	3–1	—	1–1	1–1	3–0	3–0	0–1	3–0	2–1	2–0
Grbalj	0–2	1–3	—	1–0	1–2	3–2	2–1	1–0	0–4	2–1
Igalo	2–0	1–0	0–0	—	0–1	1–1	2–0	4–1	0–2	1–1
Internacional	0–0	0–4	0–0	0–2	—	1–0	2–9	1–1	0–1	1–4
Iskra	1–2	0–2	1–0	2–1	2–1	—	1–0	1–0	0–0	1–2
Kom	2–3	0–1	0–2	0–2	2–1	0–1	—	4–2	0–3	4–1
Lovćen	0–0	0–3	1–2	2–0	1–1	1–0	2–1	—	0–0	1–1
Otrant-Olympic	6–0	0–0	2–1	2–1	1–0	1–1	3–0	4–1	—	3–1
Podgorica	1–0	3–7	2–1	0–1	2–1	0–0	2–3	2–2	0–2	—

Source: Football Association of Montenegro (in Montenegrin)
Legend: Blue = home team win; Yellow = draw; Red = away team win.

== Statistics ==
=== Top goalscorers ===
As of 4 June 2024

Rank	Player	Club	Goals
1	(Montenegro) Vladimir Perišić	Kom	22
2	(Montenegro) Dejan Pepić	Bokelj	20
3	(Japan) Takeru Komiya	Podgorica	17
4	(Montenegro) Ognjen Rolović	Iskra	14
5	(Montenegro) Halil Muharemović	Otrant-Olympic	12
5	(Montenegro) Anđelo Rudović	Otrant-Olympic	12

== See also ==
- Montenegrin Second League
- 2023–24 Montenegrin First League
- Montenegrin Third League
