= 2018–19 Montenegrin Second League =

Montenegrin Second League
- Season: 2018–19
- Dates: 12 August 2018 – 25 May 2019
- Champions: Mladost Lješkopolje
- Promoted: Mladost Lješkopolje; Kom
- Relegated: Igalo; Berane
- Matches played: 180
- Goals scored: 376 (2.09 per match)
- Top goalscorer: Dejan Pepić (Bokelj) (16 goals)
- Biggest home win: Bokelj 6–0 Berane (18 August 2018)
- Biggest away win: Berane 0–6 Bokelj (14 October 2018)
- Highest scoring: Otrant-Olympic 5–3 Berane (7 October 2018)

The 2018–19 Montenegrin Second League was the 13th season since the establishment of the Montenegrin Second League. The season ran from 12 August 2018 to May 2019. That was the first season with 10 participants.

== Format of competition ==
A total of 10 teams participated in this edition of the Second League. The new members were FK Kom and FK Dečić who was relegated from 2017–18 Montenegrin First League, and winners of Montenegrin Third League playoffs - FK Arsenal Tivat.
This was the first season of Second CFL with 10 participants. At the end of the season, worst-placed team on the table would be directly relegated to the Montenegrin Third League.

== Teams ==
Locations of the 2018–19 teams

The following 10 clubs competed in this season.

Club	City	Finishing in 2017–18	Stadium
Arsenal	Tivat	1st in Third League - South	Stadion u parku (2,000)
Berane	Berane	6th	Gradski stadion (11,000)
Bokelj	Kotor	4th	Stadion pod Vrmcem (1,000)
Dečić	Tuzi	10th in First League	Stadion Tuško Polje (2,000)
Igalo	Igalo	8th	Stadion Solila (1,600)
Jedinstvo	Bijelo Polje	7th	Gradski Stadion (4,000)
Jezero	Plav	9th	Stadion pod Racinom (5,000)
Kom	Podgorica	8th in First League	Stadion Zlatica (1,200)
Mladost Lješkopolje	Podgorica	2nd	DG Arena (1,200)
Otrant-Olympic	Ulcinj	5th	Stadion Olympic (1,500)

== League table ==
Pos	Team	Pld	W	D	L	GF	GA	GD	Pts	Promotion or relegation
1	Mladost Lješkopolje (C, P)	36	20	7	9	59	34	+25	67	Promotion to the First League
2	Kom (O, P)	36	17	9	10	40	30	+10	60	Qualification for the promotion play-offs
3	Bokelj	36	16	10	10	51	25	+26	58	Qualification for the promotion play-offs
4	Otrant-Olympic	36	14	9	13	40	39	+1	51	
5	Arsenal	36	13	10	13	34	29	+5	49	
6	Jedinstvo	36	11	15	10	26	25	+1	48	
7	Jezero	36	13	9	14	32	43	−11	48	
8	Dečić (Note: Dečić were deducted 3 points.)	36	13	10	13	40	39	+1	46	
9	Igalo (R)	36	11	10	15	28	34	−6	43	Relegation to the Third League
10	Berane (Note: Berane were deducted 3 points.) (R)	36	6	3	27	26	78	−52	18	Relegation to the Third League

Source: Football Association of Montenegro (in Montenegrin)
Rules for classification: 1) Points; 2) Head-to-head points; 3) Head-to-head goal difference; 3) Head-to-head goals scored; 5) Head-to-head away goals scored; 6) Goal difference; 7) Goals scored; 8) Draw.
(C) Champions; (O) Play-off winners; (P) Promoted; (R) Relegated

== Results ==
=== First half of the season ===
Home \ Away	ARS	BER	BOK	DEČ	IGA	JED	JEZ	KOM	MLA	OTR
Arsenal	—	2–0	1–0	1–1	0–0	0–0	2–1	1–0	0–1	1–3
Berane	0–2	—	0–6	0–4	0–2	0–1	1–2	0–1	0–0	0–2
Bokelj	0–0	6–0	—	3–0	1–0	1–0	3–0	1–2	4–2	1–3
Dečić	0–0	6–1	1–0	—	0–2	0–0	4–1	0–0	2–0	4–1
Igalo	1–0	1–2	2–1	0–0	—	1–0	2–0	0–0	0–1	2–1
Jedinstvo	1–1	2–0	0–0	2–1	1–1	—	3–2	0–0	0–2	0–0
Jezero	0–2	2–0	1–1	2–1	0–0	0–0	—	2–1	0–0	1–2
Kom	3–2	1–0	0–2	1–0	1–0	1–0	0–0	—	2–0	2–2
Mladost Lješkopolje	2–0	2–1	0–0	1–0	3–1	0–0	4–0	3–2	—	2–1
Otrant-Olympic	0–0	5–3	0–0	1–2	1–0	0–0	1–1	2–1	0–1	—

Source: Football Association of Montenegro (in Montenegrin)
Legend: Blue = home team win; Yellow = draw; Red = away team win.

=== Second half of the season ===
Home \ Away	ARS	BER	BOK	DEČ	IGA	JED	JEZ	KOM	MLA	OTR
Arsenal	—	2–1	2–2	5–0	1–0	2–1	2–0	0–0	0–1	0–1
Berane	0–1	—	2–1	1–3	1–3	1–0	1–0	0–4	0–2	0–1
Bokelj	1–0	1–1	—	0–0	1–0	3–0	0–0	2–0	2–0	3–1
Dečić	1–0	0–3	1–0	—	1–1	4–1	0–3	1–2	1–2	1–0
Igalo	3–2	1–1	0–1	0–0	—	0–0	0–1	2–0	2–1	0–2
Jedinstvo	2–0	2–1	1–0	3–0	0–0	—	0–1	0–1	1–0	2–0
Jezero	1–0	3–1	1–0	0–0	1–0	0–0	—	3–0	1–4	1–0
Kom	1–0	2–1	2–1	2–0	2–0	0–0	4–0	—	1–2	0–2
Mladost Lješkopolje	1–2	4–0	2–2	0–1	4–1	2–2	3–1	1–1	—	1–2
Otrant-Olympic	0–0	1–3	0–1	0–0	3–0	0–1	1–0	0–0	1–5	—

Source: Football Association of Montenegro (in Montenegrin)
Legend: Blue = home team win; Yellow = draw; Red = away team win.

== Promotion play-offs ==
The 3rd-placed team (against the 10th-placed team of the First League) and the runners-up (against the 11th-placed team of the First League) will both compete in two-legged promotion play-offs after the end of the season.

=== Summary ===
Team 1	Agg.	Team 2	1st leg	2nd leg
Bokelj	1–4	Rudar	0–2	1–2
Lovćen	0–2	Kom	0–1	0–1

=== Matches ===
29 May 2019
17:30 CEST

Bokelj	0–2	Rudar
	Report	Nya-Vedji 41'; Zečević 78'

Stadion pod Vrmcem, Kotor
Attendance: 600
Referee: Jovan Kaluđerović
2 June 2019
17:30 CEST

Rudar	2–1	Bokelj
Grbić 11' (o.g.); Vukić 56'	Report	Pepić 9'

Gradski stadion, Pljevlja
Attendance: 500
Referee: Miloš Savović

Rudar won 4–1 on aggregate.

4 June 2019
17:30 CEST

Lovćen	0–1	Kom
	Report	Gardašević 3'

Stadion pod Vrmcem, Kotor
Attendance: 500
Referee: Predrag Radovanović
10 June 2019
17:30 CEST

Kom	1–0	Lovćen
Gardašević 62'	Report

Stadion Zlatica, Podgorica
Attendance: 800
Referee: Predrag Radovanović

Kom won 2–0 on aggregate.

== Top scorers ==
Rank	Scorer	Club	Goals
1	(Montenegro) Dejan Pepić	Bokelj	16
2	(Montenegro) Igor Vukčević	Arsenal	10
3	(Montenegro) Dragan Nikolić	Otrant-Olympic	9
4	(Montenegro) Ivan Bulatović	Mladost Lješkopolje	8
4	(Montenegro) Mehmed Divanović	Otrant-Olympic	8
4	(Montenegro) Sava Gardašević	Kom	8
4	(Montenegro) Anđelko Jovanović	Mladost Lješkopolje	8
4	(Montenegro) Rijad Pepić	Dečić	8
