= 2008–09 Montenegrin Second League =

Montenegrin Second League
- Season: 2008–09
- Champions: Berane
- Promoted: Berane; Mornar
- Relegated: Arsenal; Ribnica
- Matches: 198
- Goals: 457 (2.31 per match)

The 2008–09 Montenegrin Second League (Serbian: Druga Crnogorska Liga / Друга црногорска лига) was the third season since its establishment.

== Format of competition ==
Twelve teams participate in this league. The top team directly qualifies for the Montenegrin First League while the second and third teams contest in a two matches playoff against the 11th and 12th team from the First League. The two bottom-placed teams are relegated to the Third League, to be replaced by the two winners of the Third League promotion play-off.

== Teams ==
Locations of the 2008–09 teams

The following 12 clubs competed in this season.

Club	City	Stadium	Capacity
Arsenal	Tivat	Stadion u Parku	4.000
Berane	Berane	Gradski stadion	11,000
Bokelj	Kotor	Stadion pod Vrmcem	5,000
Bratstvo Cijevna	Podgorica	Stadion Bratstva	1,000
Crvena Stijena	Podgorica	Stadion Tološi	1,000
Čelik	Nikšić	Stadion Željezare	2,000
Ibar	Rožaje	Bandžovo Brdo	2,500
Mladost	Podgorica	Stadion Cvijetni Brijeg	2,000
Mornar	Bar	Stadion Topolica	2,500
Otrant	Ulcinj	Stadion Olympic	1,500
Ribnica	Podgorica	Stadion na Koniku	750
Zabjelo	Podgorica	Stadion Zabjela	1,000

== League table ==
Pos	Team	Pld	W	D	L	GF	GA	GD	Pts	Promotion or relegation
1	Berane (C, P)	33	23	5	5	63	13	+50	74	Promotion to the First League
2	Mladost	33	20	6	7	67	29	+38	66	Qualification for the promotion play-offs
3	Mornar (P)	33	16	9	8	36	28	+8	57	Qualification for the promotion play-offs
4	Otrant	33	16	4	13	55	44	+11	52	
5	Ibar	33	15	5	13	40	40	0	50	
6	Bokelj	33	11	13	9	35	36	−1	46	
7	Bratstvo	33	12	8	13	34	39	−5	44	
8	Crvena Stijena	33	11	7	15	27	36	−9	40	
9	Zabjelo	33	10	9	14	30	35	−5	39	
10	Čelik	33	10	8	15	28	38	−10	38	
11	Arsenal (Note: Arsenal were deducted 1 point.) (R)	33	9	8	16	27	38	−11	34	Relegation to the Third League
12	Ribnica (R)	33	2	4	27	16	82	−66	10	Relegation to the Third League

Rules for classification: 1) Points; 2) Head-to-head points; 3) Head-to-head goal difference; 4) Head-to-head goals scored; 5) Head-to-head away goals scored; 6) Goal difference; 7) Goals scored; 8) Draw.
(C) Champions; (P) Promoted; (R) Relegated

== Results ==
The schedule consists of three rounds. During the first two rounds, each team played each other once home-and-away for a total of 22 games. The pairings of the third round were then set according to the standings after the first two rounds, giving every team a third game against each opponent for a total of 33 games per team.

=== First and second round ===
Home \ Away	ARS	BER	BOK	BRA	CRS	ČEL	IBA	MLA	MOR	OTR	RIB	ZAB
Arsenal		0–1	1–1	3–0	0–0	0–1	0–1	1–2	0–1	0–1	3–0	0–2
Berane	4–0		1–0	4–0	4–1	3–0	3–0	1–0	3–0	3–1	4–0	2–0
Bokelj	4–0	0–0		1–1	1–1	0–0	1–1	2–2	0–0	1–0	1–1	1–0
Bratstvo	1–1	1–1	2–0		3–0	1–0	1–2	2–3	2–2	2–1	2–1	0–1
Crvena Stijena	1–0	0–2	2–1	1–0		0–0	0–3 (Note: Match awarded.)	1–0	3–0	0–1	1–0	1–0
Čelik	0–2	0–3	0–1	1–0	1–0		2–2	1–1	1–3	2–0	1–0	0–1
Ibar	0–3	1–0	3–1	2–0	3–0	2–0		1–1	1–0	3–1	2–0	1–1
Mladost	1–0	2–1	3–1	4–1	3–0	1–0	2–0		2–0	4–0	0–1	3–1
Mornar	3–0	0–2	2–0	0–0	1–0	3–1	1–0	1–1		1–0	3–1	0–0
Otrant	3–0	0–4	2–0	0–1	1–0	5–1	2–1	2–1	0–0		1–0	3–2
Ribnica	0–1	0–1	0–1	2–2	0–2	1–1	0–2	1–2	1–2	0–3		0–0
Zabjelo	1–0	0–1	1–3	1–1	0–1	2–1	0–0	2–2	0–1	3–1	0–1	

Legend: Blue = home team win; Yellow = draw; Red = away team win.

=== Third round ===
Home \ Away	ARS	BER	BOK	BRA	CRS	ČEL	IBA	MLA	MOR	OTR	RIB	ZAB
Arsenal		0–0	0–0				3–1			1–0		0–0
Berane				3–0	0–0	1–2		2–1	1–1		3–0	
Bokelj		1–0		0–2		1–0	2–1			3–3		
Bratstvo	0–0				0–1			1–0	2–0			3–0
Crvena Stijena	0–1		1–2					0–2	0–1		4–0	2–2
Čelik	1–1			1–0	0–0			2–1	3–0			
Ibar		0–2		0–1	3–2	1–0			0–2		2–0	
Mladost	5–0		1–1				4–0			2–0	6–1	4–1
Mornar	1–0		2–2					0–1		1–1	2–0	2–0
Otrant		1–3		3–0	1–1	2–1	3–1				12–2	
Ribnica	2–6		1–2	0–2		0–4						0–4
Zabjelo		1–0	2–0			0–0	2–0			0–1		

Legend: Blue = home team win; Yellow = draw; Red = away team win.

== Promotion play-offs ==
The 3rd-placed team (against the 10th-placed team of the First League) and the runners-up (against the 11th-placed team of the First League) will both compete in two-legged promotion play-offs after the end of the season.

=== Summary ===
Team 1	Agg.	Team 2	1st leg	2nd leg
Mladost	1–2	Dečić	0–2	1–0
Mornar	2–1	Jezero	2–1	0–0

=== Matches ===
3 June 2009
17:30 CEST

Mladost	0–2	Dečić
	Report (page 37)	Vasić 11'; Lekić 82'

Mladost Stadium, Podgorica
Attendance: 1,200
Referee: Aleksandar Marković
7 June 2009
17:30 CEST

Dečić	0–1	Mladost
	Report (page 37)	Vešović 5'

Stadion Tuško Polje, Tuzi
Attendance: 1,500
Referee: Jovan Kaluđerović

Dečić won 3–0 on aggregate.

3 June 2009
17:30 CEST

Mornar	2–1	Jezero
Bukilić 59'; Jelenić 75'	Report (page 37)	Pavićević 71'

Stadion Topolica, Bar
Attendance: 1,500
Referee: Jovan Kaluđerović
7 June 2009
17:30 CEST

Jezero	0–0	Mornar
	Report (page 37)

Stadion Pod Racinom, Plav
Attendance: 3,000
Referee: Ranko Spasojević

Mornar won 2–1 on aggregate.
