= Tin Matić =

Croatian footballer (born 1997)

Personal information
- Date of birth: 23 October 1997 (age 29)
- Place of birth: Zagreb, Croatia
- Height: 1.78 m (5 ft 10 in)
- Position: Forward

Team information
- Current team: Balestier Khalsa
- Number: 17

Youth career
- –2007: Hrvatski Dragovoljac
- 2007–2016: Dinamo Zagreb

Senior career*
Years	Team	Apps	(Gls)
2015–2016	Dinamo Zagreb II	2	(0)
2016–2019	Legia Warsaw II	14	(0)
2016	→ Zagłębie Sosnowiec (loan)	12	(1)
2017–2018	→ Zemplín Michalovce (loan)	5	(0)
2018–2019	→ Zadar (loan)	4	(1)
2020	Hrvatski Dragovoljac	2	(0)
2020–2021	Bilje	20	(12)
2021–2022	Triglav Kranj	26	(21)
2022–2024	Celje	21	(1)
2023–2024	→ Aluminij (loan)	24	(6)
2024–2025	Rudeš	19	(2)
2025–	Balestier Khalsa	28	(8)

International career
2011	Croatia U14	2	(0)
2012	Croatia U15	1	(0)
2013	Croatia U16	3	(0)
2015	Croatia U18	2	(4)
2015–2016	Croatia U19	10	(4)
- * Club domestic league appearances and goals as of 21 November 2026

Tin Matić (born 23 October 1997) is a Croatian professional footballer who plays as a forward for Singapore Premier League club Balestier Khalsa.

== Club career ==
=== Youth ===
Matić was a youth graduate at Dinamo Zagreb where he played for Dinamo Zagreb II making his debut on 7 October 2015 against Sesvete.

In July 2016, Matić moved to Polish club Legia Warsaw II where he make his debut on 4 March 2017 in a 3–0 win over Huragan Morag. Matić was released by the club in July 2019.

==== Zagłębie Sosnowiec (loan) ====
On 13 July 2016, Matić was loaned to II liga club Zagłębie Sosnowiec. He make his professional debut on 31 July in a 2–2 draw to Chojniczanka. Matić got his first goal involvement where he assisted Łukasz Matusiak to scored the only goal in the match in a 1–0 win over Pogoń Siedlce on 6 August. Three days later, he scored his first professional career goal during the round of 32 of the 2016–17 Polish Cup in a 4–3 lost to Wisla Kraków. On 3 September, he scored his first league goal in a 4–1 win over Znicz Pruszków.

==== Zemplín Michalovce (loan) ====
On 18 August 2017, Matić was loaned to Slovak First League club Zemplín Michalovce. He make his debut for the club on 19 August against AS Trenčín.

==== Zadar (loan) ====
On 7 August 2018, Matić was loaned to 2. HNLclub Zadar. On 7 September, he scored his first goal for the club in a 3–3 draw to Sesvete.

=== Hrvatski Dragovoljac ===
After being seven months without a club, Matić signed a contract with Hrvatski Dragovoljac on 21 February 2020.

=== Balestier Khalsa ===
On 15 July 2025, Matić signed a contract with Singapore Premier League club Balestier Khalsa.

== International career ==
Matić represent the Croatia U19 squad where he make his debut on 7 September 2015 against England U19 in a 1–1 draw. During the 2015 UEFA European Under-19 Championship qualification match against Montenegro U19 on 18 September, Matić scored a brace as Croatia U19 won 3–1.

== Career statistics ==
=== Club ===
As of 21 November 2026.

Club	Season	League			Cup		Continental		Other		Total	
Club	Season	Division	Apps	Goals	Apps	Goals	Apps	Goals	Apps	Goals	Apps	Goals
MFK Zemplín Michalovce (loan)	2017–18	Slovak First Football League	5	0	0	0	0	0	0	0	5	0
MFK Zemplín Michalovce (loan)	Total		5	0	0	0	0	0	0	0	5	0
NK Zadar (loan)	2018–19	Croatian First Football League	4	1	0	0	0	0	0	0	4	1
NK Zadar (loan)	Total		4	1	0	0	0	0	0	0	4	1
NK Hrvatski Dragovoljac	2019–20	Croatian First Football League	2	0	0	0	0	0	0	0	2	0
NK Hrvatski Dragovoljac	Total		2	0	0	0	0	0	0	0	2	0
ND Bilje	2020–21	Montenegrin Second League	20	12	0	0	0	0	0	0	20	12
ND Bilje	Total		20	12	0	0	0	0	0	0	20	12
NK Triglav Kranj	2021–22	Montenegrin Second League	28	23	0	0	0	0	0	0	28	23
NK Triglav Kranj	Total		28	23	0	0	0	0	0	0	28	23
NK Celje	2022–23	Slovenian PrvaLiga	21	1	0	0	0	0	0	0	21	1
NK Celje	Total		21	1	0	0	0	0	0	0	21	1
NK Aluminij (loan)	2023–24	Slovenian PrvaLiga	24	5	0	0	0	0	0	0	24	5
NK Aluminij (loan)	Total		24	5	0	0	0	0	0	0	24	5
NK Rudeš	2024–25	Croatian Football League	19	2	1	0	0	0	0	0	21	2
NK Rudeš	Total		19	2	1	0	0	0	0	0	21	2
Balestier Khalsa	2025–26	Singapore Premier League	21	6	6	5	0	0	0	0	27	11
Balestier Khalsa	2026–27	Singapore Premier League	7	2	0	0	0	0	0	0	7	2
Balestier Khalsa	Total		28	8	6	5	0	0	0	0	34	13
Career total			151	52	7	5	0	0	0	0	158	57
