= 2020–21 Montenegrin Second League =

Montenegrin Second League
- Season: 2020–21
- Dates: 23 August 2020 – 26 May 2021
- Matches played: 180
- Goals scored: 448 (2.49 per match)
- Top goalscorer: Nikola Globarević (Berane); Nino Vukmarković (Mornar) (both 15 goals)
- Biggest home win: Mornar 10–0 Drezga (12 May 2021)
- Biggest away win: Ibar 0–4 Berane (15 November 2020) Arsenal Tivat 0–4 Mornar (28 April 2021)
- Highest scoring: Mornar 10–0 Drezga (12 May 2021)

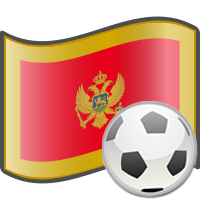
Icon for soccer from Montenegro

The 2020–21 Montenegrin Second League was the 15th season since the establishment of the Montenegrin Second League. The season ran from August 2020 to May 2021. That was the third season with 10 participating teams.

== Format of competition ==
A total of 10 teams participate in this edition of the Second League. The new members are Grbalj and Kom, who were relegated from 2019–20 Montenegrin First League, and winners of Montenegrin Third League playoffs - Berane and Igalo.

This was the third season of Second CFL with 10 participants. At the end of the season, the winner is automatically promoted to Montenegrin First League, while 2nd and 3rd placed teams play promotion play-offs, while 9th and 10th position lead to relegation to the Montenegrin Third League.

== Teams ==
The following 10 clubs compete in this season.

Locations of the 2020–21 teams

Club	City	Finishing in 2019–20	Stadium
Arsenal	Tivat	6th	Stadion u parku (2,000)
Berane	Berane	1st in Third League - North	Berane City Stadium (6,500)
Bokelj	Kotor	3rd	Stadion Pod Vrmcem (1,000)
Drezga	Piperi	8th	Spuž City Stadium (1,700)
Grbalj	Radanovići	10th in First League	Stadion Donja Sutvara (1,500)
Ibar	Rožaje	5th	Bandžovo Brdo (3,000)
Igalo	Igalo	1st in Third League - South	Stadion Solila (1,600)
Jedinstvo	Bijelo Polje	4th	Gradski Stadion (4,000)
Kom	Podgorica	9th in First League	Stadion Zlatica (1,200)
Mornar	Bar	7th	Topolica (2,500)

== League table ==
Pos	Team	Pld	W	D	L	GF	GA	GD	Pts	Promotion or relegation
1	Mornar (C, P)	36	22	9	5	70	22	+48	75	Promotion to the First League
2	Arsenal	36	20	7	9	47	39	+8	67	Qualification for the promotion play-offs
3	Igalo	36	15	12	9	53	34	+19	57	Qualification for the promotion play-offs
4	Kom	36	15	7	14	45	45	0	52	
5	Bokelj	36	11	15	10	42	36	+6	48	
6	Jedinstvo	36	11	11	14	49	42	+7	44	
7	Berane (Note: Berane were deducted 1 point.)	36	12	9	15	43	51	−8	44	
8	Grbalj	36	12	6	18	36	45	−9	42	
9	Ibar (R)	36	12	5	19	33	57	−24	41	Relegation to the Third League
10	Drezga (Note: Drezga were deducted 1 point.) (R)	36	7	5	24	30	77	−47	25	Relegation to the Third League

Source: Football Association of Montenegro (in Montenegrin)
Rules for classification: 1) Points; 2) Head-to-head points; 3) Head-to-head goal difference; 3) Head-to-head goals scored; 5) Head-to-head away goals scored; 6) Goal difference; 7) Goals scored; 8) Draw.
(C) Champions; (P) Promoted; (R) Relegated

== Results ==
=== First half of the season ===
Home \ Away	ARS	BER	BOK	DRE	GRB	IBA	IGA	JED	KOM	MOR
Arsenal	—	3–1	2–1	1–0	1–0	1–1	2–0	3–2	2–1	2–1
Berane	1–2	—	1–1	3–0	0–3	1–0	0–0	3–1	2–1	0–3
Bokelj	3–2	0–1	—	3–1	0–1	1–1	1–1	1–1	1–1	0–0
Drezga	1–3	0–1	1–0	—	0–2	3–0	0–0	1–4	1–2	3–3
Grbalj	2–1	0–1	1–1	1–1	—	1–0	0–2	1–1	0–2	2–3
Ibar	0–2	0–4	1–2	2–1	2–0	—	1–2	0–0	1–1	0–0
Igalo	2–0	2–1	1–1	2–0	0–2	6–0	—	1–1	0–1	2–2
Jedinstvo	0–2	2–0	1–1	1–0	2–0	5–0	0–0	—	1–2	1–2
Kom	2–2	3–1	1–0	4–0	2–0	0–1	0–2	1–0	—	1–0
Mornar	2–0	0–0	1–0	2–0	1–0	3–0	0–0	2–1	1–2	—

Source: Football Association of Montenegro (in Montenegrin)
Legend: Blue = home team win; Yellow = draw; Red = away team win.

=== Second half of the season ===
Home \ Away	ARS	BER	BOK	DRE	GRB	IBA	IGA	JED	KOM	MOR
Arsenal	—	1–1	0–0	0–0	2–1	1–0	0–0	1–0	1–2	0–4
Berane	0–1	—	1–1	4–1	2–0	0–1	2–1	0–1	2–3	1–1
Bokelj	0–1	3–3	—	0–1	3–0	2–0	1–1	2–0	1–0	2–1
Drezga	0–1	2–1	1–2	—	0–4	2–4	1–1	1–4	1–3	0–1
Grbalj	2–1	2–2	0–0	1–2	—	2–0	0–2	0–0	1–0	1–2
Ibar	1–3	2–3	1–0	1–0	3–2	—	2–1	2–0	4–2	0–2
Igalo	4–1	4–0	2–3	4–1	0–1	1–0	—	2–0	0–0	1–0
Jedinstvo	1–1	3–0	3–3	1–2	3–1	0–1	3–1	—	2–0	2–2
Kom	0–1	0–0	0–1	1–2	1–2	2–1	2–5	2–2	—	0–0
Mornar	3–0	3–0	2–1	10–0	2–0	1–0	5–0	1–0	4–0	—

Source: Football Association of Montenegro (in Montenegrin)
Legend: Blue = home team win; Yellow = draw; Red = away team win.

== Promotion play-offs ==
The 3rd-placed team (against the 10th-placed team of the First League) and the runners-up (against the 11th-placed team of the First League) will both compete in two-legged promotion play-offs after the end of the season.

=== Summary ===
Team 1	Agg.	Team 2	1st leg	2nd leg
Iskra	3–1	Igalo	2–1	1–0
Petrovac	3–3 (6–5 p)	Arsenal	2–1	1–2

=== Matches ===
1 June 2021
20:00 CEST

Iskra	2–1	Igalo
Milić 46'; Račić 58'	Report	Lee 90+3'

Braća Velašević Stadium, Danilovgrad
Attendance: 200
Referee: Milovan Milačić
6 June 2021
17:30 CEST

Igalo	0–1	Iskra
	Report	Vuković 25' (pen.)

Stadion Solila, Igalo
Attendance: 400
Referee: Predrag Radovanović

Iskra won 3–1 on aggregate.

1 June 2021
20:00 CEST

Petrovac	2–1	Arsenal
Medigović 30', 88'	Report	Manojlović 44' (pen.)

Stadion pod Malim brdom, Petrovac
Attendance: 320
Referee: Nikola Dabanović
6 June 2021
17:30 CEST

Arsenal	2–1	Petrovac
Montenegro 25'; Manojlović 58' (pen.)	Report	Bašić 79'
Penalties
Montenegro (penalty scored); Ryo Tachibana (penalty missed); Radinović (penalty scored); Manojlović (penalty scored); Todorović (penalty scored); Musić (penalty scored); Hadžibegović (penalty missed)	5–6	(penalty scored) Bašić; (penalty scored) Divanović; (penalty scored) Ryoya Tachibana; (penalty scored) Vukčević; (penalty missed) Mikijelj; (penalty scored) Draganić; (penalty scored) Zvrko

Stadion u Parku, Tivat
Attendance: 1,500
Referee: Savo Vujović

4–4 on aggregate. Petrovac won on penalties.

== Top scorers ==
Rank	Scorer	Club	Goals
1	(Montenegro) Nikola Globarević	Berane	15
1	(Montenegro) Nino Vukmarković	Mornar	15
3	(Montenegro) Vule Vujačić	Kom	13
4	(Montenegro) Aleksa Maraš	Igalo	11
5	(Montenegro) Boško Guzina	Mornar	10
5	(Montenegro) Mijodrag Koprivica	Igalo	10
5	(Montenegro) Jasmin Muhović	Arsenal	10
5	(Montenegro) Nikola Stanišić	Grbalj	10
9	(Montenegro) Dejan Pepić	Mornar	9
9	(Montenegro) Jovan Popović	Bokelj	9
