= 2012–13 Montenegrin Second League =

Montenegrin Second League
- Season: 2012–13
- Champions: Dečić
- Promoted: Dečić
- Relegated: Iskra; Bar
- Matches: 150
- Goals: 383 (2.55 per match)
- Top goalscorer: Vule Vujačić (Dečić) (18 goals)

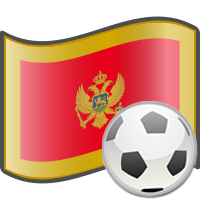

The 2012–13 Montenegrin Second League (Serbian: Druga Crnogorska Liga / Друга црногорска лига) was the seventh season of the competition as the second top football league in Montenegro. The league played its first games of the season on August 19, 2012 and its final matches were played on June 1, 2013.

== Format of competition ==
Twelve teams participate in this league. The top team directly qualifies for the Montenegrin First League while the second and third teams contest in a two matches playoff against the 11th and 12th team from the First League. The two bottom-placed teams are relegated to the Third League, to be replaced by the two winners of the Third League promotion play-off.

== Teams ==
Locations of the 2012–13 teams

The following 12 clubs competed in this season.

Club	City	Stadium	Capacity
Arsenal	Tivat	Stadion u Parku	4,000
Bar	Bar	Stadion Topolica	2,500
Berane	Berane	Gradski stadion	11,000
Bokelj	Kotor	Stadion pod Vrmcem	5,000
Bratstvo Cijevna	Podgorica	Stadion Bratstva	1,000
Dečić	Tuzi	Stadion Tuško Polje	5,000
Ibar	Rožaje	Bandžovo Brdo	2,500
Igalo	Igalo	Stadion Solila	1,600
Iskra	Danilovgrad	Stadion Braće Velašević	2,000
Jezero	Plav	Stadion Pod Racinom	5,000
Zabjelo	Podgorica	Stadion Zabjela	1,000
Zora	Spuž	Gradski stadion	3,000

== League table ==
Pos	Team	Pld	W	D	L	GF	GA	GD	Pts	Promotion or relegation
1	Dečić (C, P)	30	21	3	6	46	19	+27	66	Promotion to the First League
2	Bokelj	30	16	8	6	39	20	+19	56	Qualification for the promotion play-offs
3	Zabjelo	30	15	8	7	40	29	+11	53	Qualification for the promotion play-offs
4	Bratstvo	30	14	5	11	41	32	+9	47	
5	Igalo	30	11	9	10	39	35	+4	42	
6	Jezero	30	8	12	10	26	29	−3	36	
7	Berane	30	10	8	12	38	56	−18	38	
8	Ibar	30	7	12	11	33	36	−3	33	
9	Zora	30	8	6	16	28	32	−4	30	
10	Arsenal	30	5	14	11	24	38	−14	29	
11	Iskra (R)	30	5	5	20	29	57	−28	20	Relegation to the Third League
12	Bar (Note: Bar were withdraw from the league due to the financial reasons.) (R)	0	0	0	0	0	0	0	0	Relegation to the Third League

Rules for classification: 1) Points; 2) Head-to-head points; 3) Head-to-head goal difference; 4) Head-to-head goals scored; 5) Head-to-head away goals scored; 6) Goal difference; 7) Goals scored; 8) Draw.
(C) Champions; (P) Promoted; (R) Relegated

== Results ==
The schedule consists of three rounds. During the first two rounds, each team played each other once home-and-away for a total of 22 games. The pairings of the third round were then set according to the standings after the first two rounds, giving every team a third game against each opponent for a total of 33 games per team.

=== First and second round ===
Home \ Away	ARS	BAR	BER	BOK	BRA	DEČ	IBA	IGA	ISK	JEZ	ZAB	ZOR
Arsenal		1–1	1–0	1–1	0–1	1–1	1–1	3–3	1–2	1–1	0–0	0–3
Bar	0–0		0–2	0–3 (Note: The match between OFK Bar and Bokelj was not played, the home team did not have the material resources which are needed to play the match. It was registered with the official result for the away team, but was later annulled, after OFK Bar withdrew from the league, before the start of the spring part of the season.)	0–3	0–3	2–0		1–1		0–2	1–1
Berane	1–2	1–2		2–1	0–7	0–2	0–0	0–5	2–1	1–1	0–1	2–0
Bokelj	2–0	1–0	2–0		1–1	1–1	0–1	2–2	2–1	3–1	1–0	2–0
Bratstvo	2–0	0–1	5–2	1–0		0–1	3–1	1–3	2–1	0–0	3–1	3–0
Dečić	0–0	2–0	2–0	1–0	2–0		2–1	0–1	2–0	1–0	3–0	2–1
Ibar	0–0	3–0	5–2	0–2	2–0	0–3		0–1	2–1	0–0	2–2	0–0
Igalo	1–1	2–1	1–1	0–1	1–0	0–3	1–3		0–1	1–1	2–1	1–0
Iskra	0–0		0–1	0–4	3–0	3–5	1–1	1–1		1–1	1–4	3–1
Jezero	1–1	1–1	0–2	0–0	3–0	0–1	0–0	1–1	2–0		4–0	1–0
Zabjelo	1–0		1–1	2–0	0–0	1–0	1–1	1–0	3–0	2–0		3–3
Zora	3–0		4–1	0–2	0–1	0–1	2–1	0–0	3–0	0–1	0–1	

Legend: Blue = home team win; Yellow = draw; Red = away team win.

=== Third round ===
Home \ Away	ARS	BAR	BER	BOK	BRA	DEČ	IBA	IGA	ISK	JEZ	ZAB	ZOR
Arsenal		4–1		3–1						0–1	0–0	0–0
Bar												
Berane	2–2								4–4	2–0	4–3	
Bokelj			1–2		1–1		1–0	1–0	1–0			0–1
Bratstvo	2–0		1–2			3–1				1–1	1–2	1–0
Dečić	1–0		0–1	1–2				3–0	2–0		3–0	
Ibar	0–0		2–2		2–0	1–2		3–0				
Igalo	5–1		2–1		2–0	0–2				4–1		
Iskra					0–1		3–2	1–0				0–2
Jezero				0–3			2–1		3–1		0–0	0–1
Zabjelo				0–0			3–0	3–0	1–0			1–0
Zora			0–1			3–1	1–1	1–1				

Legend: Blue = home team win; Yellow = draw; Red = away team win.

== Promotion play-offs ==
The 3rd-placed team (against the 10th-placed team of the First League) and the runners-up (against the 11th-placed team of the First League) will both compete in two-legged promotion play-offs after the end of the season.

=== Summary ===
Team 1	Agg.	Team 2	1st leg	2nd leg
Zabjelo	2–9	Mogren	1–6	1–3
Bokelj	1–2	Mornar	1–0	0–2

=== Matches ===
5 June 2013
17:30 CEST

Zabjelo	1–6	Mogren
Rašović 31'	Report (page 37)	Vujović 35', 76', 80'; Peličić 42'; Zec 70'; Milović 79'

Camp FSCG, Podgorica
Attendance: 2,000
Referee: Pavle Radovanović
9 June 2013
17:30 CEST

Mogren	3–1	Zabjelo
Gardašević 14'; Grbović 58'; Vujović 73'	Report (page 37)	Nenadović 68'

Stadion Lugovi, Budva
Attendance: 300
Referee: Dražen Petrić

Mogren won 9–2 on aggregate.

5 June 2013
17:30 CEST

Bokelj	1–0	Mornar
Nikezić 45'	Report (page 37)

Stadion Pod Vrmcem, Kotor
Attendance: 1,000
Referee: Željko Radunović
9 June 2013
17:30 CEST

Mornar	2–0	Bokelj
Rotković 37', 84'	Report (page 37)

Stadion Topolica, Bar
Attendance: 2,000
Referee: Jovan Kaluđerović

Mornar won 2–1 on aggregate.
