= OFK Borac Bijelo Polje =

OFK Borac
- Full name: Omladinski fudbalski klub Borac Bijelo Polje
- Founded: 2015
- Ground: Gradski stadion Bijelo Polje, Montenegro
- Capacity: 4,000
- Manager: Samir Fetić
- League: Third League - North
- 2024-25: Montenegrin Third League 2nd of 9

OFK Borac (Montenegrin: Omladinski fudbalski klub Borac) is a Montenegrin football club based in Bijelo Polje. Founded in 2015, they are one of the youngest football clubs in the country and currently are members of the Montenegrin Third League.

== History ==
OFK Borac (OFC Fighter) was founded in 2015 and their debut season in the Montenegrin Third League was 2016–17. First success came during 2017, when OFK Borac played in the finals of the Northern Region Cup against FK Pljevlja (0–2). As a regional finalist, OFK Borac qualified for the Montenegrin Cup season 2017-18, but were eliminated in First Round against Second League side FK Igalo (0–3).

== Honours and achievements ==
- Northern Region Cup – 0
  - runners-up (1): 2017

== Current squad ==
During the Montenegrin Third League 2017–18 season, OFK Borac participated with following players: Mirza Ećo, Nihad Kadić, Mirnel Durović, Edis Ećo, Samir Fetić, Enis Kanalić, Ermin Popara, Dino Ljuca, Ermin Drndar, Asmir Pućurica, Alden Softić, Admir Ljuca, Nikola Kuč, Demir Mekić, Almedin Franca, Rade Korać, Emrah Bahović, Ernad Suljević, Marko Jovanović, Alden Ramović.

== Stadium ==
OFK Borac plays their home games on Gradski stadion. There are two stands with overall capacity of 4,000 seats. At the north side of stadium is situated indoor sports hall 'Nikoljac'.

== See also ==
- Gradski Stadium (Bijelo Polje)
- Bijelo Polje
- Montenegrin Third League
