= Montenegrin Second League =

- Official logo
- Founded: 2006
- Country: Montenegro
- Confederation: UEFA
- Number of clubs: 10
- Level on pyramid: 2
- Promotion to: Montenegrin First League
- Relegation to: Montenegrin Third League
- Domestic cup: Montenegrin Cup
- Current champions: FK Otrant Ulcinj (1st title) (2024–25)
- Most championships: Bokelj (3 titles)
- Broadcaster(s): Adriatic Sport
- Website: https://fscg.me/takmicenja/druga-liga
- Current: 2025–26 Montenegrin Second League

The Montenegrin Second League (Montenegrin: Druga crnogorska fudbalska liga – Druga CFL – 2. CFL) referred to as the Meridianbet 2. CFL for sponsorship reasons, is the second-top football league in Montenegro. It is headed by the Football Association of Montenegro. Second Montenegrin League consists of 10 participants. The top team qualifies for the First League of Montenegro, the second and third one contest in a playoff match against the 8th and 9th team from the First League, while the bottom-placed two teams are relegated to any of the three third-tier leagues, to be replaced by the two winners of a three-way promotion playoffs, contested by the winners of the three Third League divisions.

== History ==
=== Before independence ===
During the existence of SFR Yugoslavia, FR Yugoslavia and Serbia and Montenegro, from 1947 to 2006, Montenegrin clubs played in federal leagues. Among them, as a second-tier competitions, were Yugoslav Second League (1947–1992), Second League of FR Yugoslavia (1992–2001) and Second League of Serbia and Montenegro (2001–2006).
Overall, 25 different Montenegrin teams played in Yugoslav Second League from 1947 to 2006. Most seasons in second-tier spent FK Sutjeska (30), followed by FK Lovćen (27) and OFK Titograd (24).

=== After independence ===
Following Montenegrin independence referendum (2006), Football Association of Montenegro established their own competitions – First League, Second League and Third League.

==== 2006–16 ====
On inaugural season 2006–07, members of Second League became three teams from Serbia and Montenegro Second League previous season and nine from third-tier competition (Montenegrin Republic League).
Winner of the first season was Lovćen who won the title after the hard struggle with Ibar and Bokelj. Notable game from the season, Ibar – Lovćen (0:1), played in front od 4,000 spectators, finished with crowd disturbances. At the end of the season, Lovćen gained directly promotion to Prva CFL, while Bokelj won the playoff games against Jedinstvo. Ibar didn't succeed to gain promotion to Prva CFL.
Next year, the title and directly promotion to highest rank surprisingly gained FK Jezero, with four points more than Čelik. In the First League playoffs, Čelik didn't succeed against their city rivals from Sutjeska in two games which watched 17,000 spectators overall (0:0, 0:1). But, third-placed FK Jedinstvo Bijelo Polje made success in playoff games against Bokelj (1:0, 0:0) and made a comeback to First League.
Second League winner for season 2008–09 was Berane, while in the playoffs participated OFK Titograd and Mornar. OFK Titograd lost against FK Dečić, but Mornar made historical success with their first-ever promotion to Prva CFL after the games against Jezero (2:1, 0:0). During the season 2008–09, Otrant scored 12 goals on the match against Ribnica (12:2), which is the all-time record in Montenegrin Second League.
Title for 2009–10 season won OFK Titograd, who made comeback to First League after two seasons. Second-placed OFK Bar made a surprisingly success in playoffs against Berane after the penalties and made their first and last promotion to Prva CFL. Third-placed Bratstvo from Podgorica outskirts lost in playoffs against another team from Bar – Mornar (0:1, 1:2).
Bokelj dominated on season 2010–11, finishing first with 24 points more than second-placed team. After the playoff games, promotion to First League gained Berane, too, while Jedinstvo, which won the second-place, remained in Second League after unsuccessful playoff performances against Sutjeska.
Next year, Second League title won Čelik from Nikšić, with score of 80 points. Except first-ever promotion to the First League in their history, Čelik made notable success in 2011–12 Montenegrin Cup during the same season. They became the first member of Second League which played in the finals and won the national Cup. In final game, played in Podgorica City Stadium, Čelik defeated First-League side Rudar – 2:1. Except that, for the first and so far last time in the history, both representatives of Second League won their games in First League payoffs. Second-placed Mornar eliminated Berane (2:1, 3:0), while third-placed Jedinstvo won against Dečić (0:0, 1:0). So, after the season 2011–12, three teams from Second League moved to First League.
Former elite-member Dečić won the title on season 2012–13 and made a comeback to Prva CFL. Second and third placed Bokelj and Zabjelo lost their games in the playoffs, so only Dečić made a promotion to highest rank. At the beginning of the season, OFK Bar withdraw due to financial difficulties, so the championship had 11 members.
After the edition 2013–14, Bokelj and Berane became a members of Prva CFL – Bokelj as title winner and Berane after the playoff games. During that season, on game Zabjelo – Zora (5–0), player Bojan Kopitović scored five goals, which is the all-time record in Montenegrin Second League.
On season 2014–15, title race between Iskra and Dečić lasted until the end of championship. With two points more than their main opponents, Iskra finished first and made their first-ever promotion to the highest-level competition. But, Dečić gained promotion to Prva CFL too, after the playoff games against former national champions Mogren (2–1; 5–0).
Next year, Jedinstvo became a champion. They won the title race with biggest surprise of championship – Cetinje, while the third finished Bratstvo. But, only Jedinstvo gained promotion. Performances of Cetinje and Bratstvo in playoffs were unsuccessful. That season had 11 members, because Mogren withdraw due to financial troubles before the start of competition.

==== 2016– ====
On season 2016–17, Kom secured a promotion to Prva CFL after seven years spent in lowest-level competitions. Team from Podgorica outskirts won the first place, while Ibar and Otrant finished second and third, but without promotion.
Montenegrin Second League 2017–18 finished with success of Mornar who won the first place and direct place in Prva CFL 2018–19. Third-placed Lovćen gained promotion after the playoffs against First-League side Kom (1–0; 0–0), while the newcomer in Second League FK Podgorica, who finished second, lost their playoff games. During the same season, last-placed Čelik made few negative-records at that time. Team which once won the Montenegrin Cup and played in UEFA Europa League finished season with only 8 points, 2 wins, 28 losses, longest run without win (20 games) and one of highest loses in the history of Second League (Bokelj – Čelik 10–0).
Next year, four weeks before the end of competition, FK Podgorica secured the title and their first ever promotion to the top flight. At the same time, Kom and Bokelj, as a second and third placed, participated in the playoffs for First League. As a two last placed teams, Igalo and Berane were relegated to Montenegrin Third League.
Season 2019–20 was interrupted after 30 weeks, due to the coronavirus pandemic. Therefore, Dečić, who had 10 points more than second-placed Jezero, gained direct promotion to Prva CFL. As Football Association of Montenegro decided, runner-up and third-placed squad at the moment of disruption (Jezero and Bokelj), participated in the playoffs for Prva CFL. While FK Jezero gained promotion to Prva CFL, FK Bokelj was eliminated after the penalties against OFK Titograd. From the other side, two worst-placed teams (Lovćen and Otrant) were relegated. That was the first time in the history when FK Lovćen, the oldest Montenegrin club, went to the bottom-tier. Except that, team from Cetinje was relegated to Montenegrin Third League only one year after they played in Prva CFL and in the final game of Montenegrin Cup.
Mornar won the title on season 2020–21 and secured comeback to top-tier after two consecutive seasons in Second League. Second and third placed Arsenal and Igalo didn't succeed to gain promotion via playoffs, as they were defeated against Iskra and OFK Petrovac. Two last-placed teams – Ibar and Drezga were relegated to Third League, both after two consecutive seasons spent in second-tier. During the season, Mornar made one of the all-time biggest victories in the history of competition, against Drezga (10–0).

=== Relegation and promotion ===
At the end of every season, champion of Second League is directly promoted to First League, while last placed member of First League is moving to second-tier competition. Except that, second and third placed teams from Second League are participating in First League playoffs. Their opponents are 8th and 9th team from the First League.
From the other side, two last placed teams are directly relegated to Montenegrin Third League. At the end of the season, winners of three Third League groups are participating in playoffs for Second League promotion. Two best placed teams from playoffs are gaining promotion to Montenegrin Second League.

=== Changes in league structure ===
In period 2006–2018, Montenegrin Second League consisted of 12 participants. From 2018 to 2019 season, the number of participants is reduced to 10, with 36 week-long competition.

- Number of teams:
  - 2006–07 to 2007–18: 12
  - Since 2018–19: 10

== Champions and top goalscorers by season ==
=== Champions ===
From season 2006–07, 12 different clubs won the title in Montenegrin Second League. FK Bokelj won the title three times, while Jedinstvo, FK Dečić and Mladost DG did it twice.

Promoted to Prva CFL directly or via playoffs

Season	Champions	Runners up	Third place
2006–07	Lovćen	Bokelj	Ibar
2007–08	Jezero	Čelik	Jedinstvo
2008–09	Berane	Titograd	Mornar
2009–10	Titograd	Bar	Bratstvo
2010–11	Bokelj	Berane	Jedinstvo
2011–12	Čelik	Mornar	Jedinstvo
2012–13	Dečić	Bokelj	Zabjelo
2013–14	Bokelj	Berane	Jezero
2014–15	Iskra	Dečić	Igalo
2015–16	Jedinstvo	Cetinje	Bratstvo
2016–17	Kom	Ibar	Otrant
2017–18	Mornar	Podgorica	Lovćen
2018–19	Podgorica	Kom	Bokelj
2019–20	Dečić	Jezero	Bokelj
2020–21	Mornar	Arsenal	Igalo
2021–22	Jedinstvo	Arsenal	Mladost DG
2022–23	Mladost DG	Kom	Berane
2023–24	Bokelj	Otrant	Podgorica
2024–25	Mladost DG	Rudar	Lovćen
2025–26	Otrant	OFK Grbalj	Jezero

=== Top scorers ===
During the history, the biggest number of goals during the single season scored FK Podgorica's attacker Elie Matuoke (23), during the season 2017–18. Until now, he is the only foreign player to become a topscorer in any of two highest Montenegrin football leagues.

Season	Top scorer(s)	Club	Goals
2009–10	(Montenegro) Darko Nikač	OFK Titograd	20
2010–11	(Montenegro) Vladan Radović	Berane	13
2011–12	(Montenegro) Damir Alković	Zabjelo	22
2012–13	(Montenegro) Vule Vujačić	Dečić	18
2013–14	(Montenegro) Miloš Rašović	Zabjelo	16
2014–15	(Montenegro) Sava Gardašević	Dečić	19
2015–16	(Montenegro) Danin Talović	Jezero	12
2016–17	(Montenegro) Stefan Milošević	Kom	20
2017–18	(Cameroon) Elie Matuoke	Podgorica	23
2018–19	(Montenegro) Dejan Pepić	Bokelj	16
2019–20	(Montenegro) Siniša Stanisavić	Ibar	14
2020–21	(Montenegro) Nikola Globarević (Montenegro) Nino Vukmarković	Berane; Mornar	15
2021–22	(Montenegro) Žarko Korać (Montenegro) Igor Vukčević	Jedinstvo; Kom	17
2022–23	(Montenegro) Željko Krstović	Mladost DG	11
2023–24	(Montenegro) Vladimir Perišić	Kom	22
2024–25	(Montenegro) Igor Vukčević	Mladost DG	16

== All time table ==
=== Overall ===
Montenegrin Second League is existing as a competition under the national football association of Montenegro from the season 2006–07. Overall, 35 different clubs participated in the Montenegrin Second League. FK Ibar played the biggest number of seasons in Second League.
Below is the list of all matches and seasons by every single club in Montenegrin Second League from 2006 until now. For the previous period and Montenegrin clubs which participated in the Yugoslav Second League, see Montenegrin clubs in Yugoslav football competitions (1946–2006).

Club	Town	Ssn	First	Last	Pld	W	D	L	GD	Pts
Bokelj	Kotor	13	2006–07	2023–24	434	211	128	95	623:324	761
Jedinstvo	Bijelo Polje	12	2007–08	2021–22	399	175	108	116	508:354	633
Ibar	Rožaje	14	2006–07	2020–21	453	167	112	174	500:525	613
Berane	Berane	13	2007–08	2023–24	431	168	89	174	559:572	589
Jezero	Plav	13	2006–07	2020–21	420	153	109	158	439:474	568
Kom	Podgorica	11	2010–11	2023–24	368	147	90	131	468:417	531
Igalo	Igalo	11	2011–12	2023–24	398	140	108	150	446:410	528
Bratstvo	Cijevna	11	2006–07	2016–17	354	126	84	144	417:443	462
Otrant	Ulcinj	10	2007–08	2023–24	319	122	88	119	411:390	454
Arsenal	Tivat	10	2006–07	2021–22	333	119	91	123	361:379	448
Zabjelo	Podgorica	9	2006–07	2014–15	294	102	79	113	345:366	385
Mornar	Bar	7	2006–07	2020–21	228	106	65	57	306:192	383
Čelik	Nikšić	8	2006–07	2017–18	261	96	47	118	292:352	335
Dečić	Tuzi	4	2012–13	2019–20	129	71	29	29	205:119	241
Podgorica	Podgorica	4	2017–18	2023–24	127	65	34	38	217:151	229
Iskra	Danilovgrad	5	2010–11	2023–24	165	60	36	69	185:218	216
Cetinje	Cetinje	6	2013–14	2021–22	195	57	32	106	186:335	203
Lovćen	Cetinje	4	2006–07	2023–24	132	54	38	40	172:153	200
Grbalj	Radanovići	4	2020–21	2023–24	130	43	26	61	143:178	165
Titograd	Podgorica	3	2008–09	2021–22	102	47	19	36	168:122	160
Crvena Stijena	Podgorica	4	2006–07	2009–10	132	40	35	57	108:147	155
Mladost DG	Podgorica	2	2021–22	2022–23	68	33	17	18	89:74	116
Zora	Spuž	3	2006–07	2013–14	96	31	20	45	92:119	113
Radnički	Berane	3	2014–15	2016–17	93	28	23	42	118:141	107
Bar	Bar	2	2009–10	2011–12	66	30	15	21	84:64	105
Gusinje	Gusinje	3	2006–07	2009–10	99	22	26	51	74:154	92
Drezga	Piperi	2	2019–20	2020–21	66	15	14	37	61:124	58
Grafičar	Podgorica	1	2015–16	2015–16	30	10	4	16	37:41	34
Zeta	Golubovci	1	2022–23	2022–23	32	9	7	16	30:44	34
Internacional	Podgorica	1	2023–24	2023–24	36	7	11	18	36:61	32
Brskovo	Mojkovac	1	2015–16	2015–16	30	5	14	11	23:35	29
Pljevlja	Pljevlja	1	2010–11	2010–11	33	5	10	18	26:50	25
Tekstilac	Bijelo Polje	1	2007–08	2007–08	33	6	6	21	20:58	24
Petnjica	Petnjica	1	2011–12	2011–12	33	3	3	27	15:78	12
Ribnica	Podgorica	1	2008–09	2008–09	33	2	4	27	16:82	10
Note: As of the end of 2023–24 season

League or status for 2022–23 season
2025–26 Montenegrin First League
2025–26 Montenegrin Second League
2025–26 Montenegrin Third League
No longer exists

Ssn = Number of seasons; Pld = Matches played; W = Matches won; D = Matches drawn; L = Matches lost; GD = Goal difference; Pts = Points;

=== Participants by season ===
Club	07	08	09	10	11	12	13	14	15	16	17	18	19	20	21	22	23	24
Arsenal	5	9	11	–	–	–	10	5	12	–	–	–	5	6	2	2	–	–
Bar	–	–	–	2	–	8	–	–	–	–	–	–	–	–	–	–	–	–
Berane	–	4	1	–	3	–	7	2	–	5	6	6	10	–	7	7	3	10
Bokelj	2	–	6	4	1	–	2	1	–	–	–	4	3	3	5	4	4	1
Bratstvo	7	7	7	3	4	5	4	11	10	3	11	–	–	–	–	–	–	–
Brskovo	–	–	–	–	–	–	–	–	–	11	–	–	–	–	–	–	–	–
Cetinje	–	–	–	–	–	–	–	7	7	2	7	11	–	–	–	10	–	–
Crvena Stijena	8	8	8	11	–	–	–	–	–	–	–	–	–	–	–	–	–	–
Čelik	10	2	10	8	8	1	–	–	–	–	9	12	–	–	–	–	–	–
Dečić	–	–	–	–	–	–	1	–	2	–	–	–	8	1	–	–	–	–
Drezga	–	–	–	–	–	–	–	–	–	–	–	–	–	8	10	–	–	–
Grafičar	–	–	–	–	–	–	–	–	–	7	–	–	–	–	–	–	–	–
Grbalj	–	–	–	–	–	–	–	–	–	–	–	–	–	–	8	8	6	4
Gusinje	6	11	–	12	–	–	–	–	–	–	–	–	–	–	–	–	–	–
Ibar	3	5	5	9	7	10	8	10	9	8	2	10	–	5	9	–	–	–
Igalo	–	–	–	–	–	6	5	9	3	9	8	8	9	–	3	6	8	5
Internacional	–	–	–	–	–	–	–	–	–	–	–	–	–	–	–	–	–	9
Iskra	–	–	–	–	5	9	11	–	1	–	–	–	–	–	–	–	–	6
Jedinstvo	–	3	–	6	2	3	–	8	5	1	–	7	6	4	6	1	–	–
Jezero	9	1	–	7	9	7	6	3	8	10	5	9	7	2	–	–	–	–
Kom	–	–	–	–	6	11	–	6	6	6	1	–	2	–	4	5	2	7
Lovćen	1	–	–	–	–	–	–	–	–	–	–	3	–	9	–	–	–	8
Mornar	11	–	3	–	–	2	–	–	–	–	4	1	–	7	1	–	–	–
Mladost DG	–	–	–	–	–	–	–	–	–	–	–	–	–	–	–	3	1	–
Otrant	–	10	4	10	11	–	–	–	–	–	3	5	4	10	–	–	7	2
Petnjica	–	–	–	–	–	12	–	–	–	–	–	–	–	–	–	–	–	–
Pljevlja	–	–	–	–	12	–	–	–	–	–	–	–	–	–	–	–	–	–
Podgorica	–	–	–	–	–	–	–	–	–	–	–	2	1	–	–	–	5	3
Radnički	–	–	–	–	–	–	–	–	4	4	10	–	–	–	–	–	–	–
Ribnica	–	–	12	–	–	–	–	–	–	–	–	–	–	–	–	–	–	–
Tekstilac	–	12	–	–	–	–	–	–	–	–	–	–	–	–	–	–	–	–
Titograd	–	–	2	1	–	–	–	–	–	–	–	–	–	–	–	9	–	–
Zabjelo	4	6	9	5	10	4	3	12	11	–	–	–	–	–	–	–	–	–
Zeta	–	–	–	–	–	–	–	–	–	–	–	–	–	–	–	–	9	–
Zora	12	–	–	–	–	–	9	4	–	–	–	–	–	–	–	–	–	–

== Records and statistics ==
=== Records by seasons ===
- Most points: 80, Čelik, season 2011–12, Bokelj, season 2023–24
- Least points: 8, Čelik, season 2017–18
- Highest number of wins: 25, Čelik, season 2011–12
- Lowest number of wins: 2, Ribnica, season 2008–09; Čelik, season 2017–18
- Highest number of losses: 28, Čelik, season 2017–18
- Lowest number of losses: 3, Čelik, season 2011–12; Dečić, season 2019–20
- Highest number of scored goals: 75, Titograd, season 2009–10
- Lowest number of scored goals: 13, Cetinje, season 2017–18
- Highest number of conceded goals: 94, Čelik, season 2017–18
- Lowest number of conceded goals: 11, Mornar, season 2017–18

=== Runs ===
- Longest unbeaten run: 23 matches, Čelik, 18.09.2011 – 09.05.2012, season 2011–12, Otrant, 08.10.2023 – 12.05.2024, season 2023–24
- Longest run without win: 24 matches, Berane, 22.08.2018 – 03.04.2019, season 2018–19
- Longest winning streak: 10 matches, Čelik, 13.11.2011 – 15.04.2012, season 2011–12
- Longest losing streak: 14 matches, Ribnica, 15.03.2009 – 30.05.2009, season 2008–09
- Longest run without conceded goal: 13 matches, Mornar, 07.03.2018 – 16.05.2018, season 2017–18
- Longest run without scored goal: 7 matches, Berane, 14.10.2018 – 02.12.2018, season 2018–19
- Longest run of goalless matches (0:0): 4 matches, Mornar, 13.08.2017 – 03.19.2017, season 2017–18

=== Single game ===
- Biggest league victory/defeat: 12–2, Otrant vs. Ribnica, 20.05.2009, Ulcinj (season 2008–09); 10–0, Bokelj – Čelik, 08.04.2018, Kotor (season 2017–18); 10–0, Mornar – Drezga, 12.05.2021, Bar (season 2020–21)
- Biggest league victory away: 0–7, Berane vs. Bratstvo, 18.11.2012, Berane (season 2012–13); 0–7, Radnički vs. Berane, 22.05.2017, Berane, (season 2016–17); 2–9, Internacional vs. Kom, 18.05.2024, Petrovac, (season 2023–24)
- Most goals in a single game: 14, Otrant vs. Ribnica 12–2, 20.05.2009, Ulcinj (season 2008–09)
- Player with most goals on a single game: 6, Vladimir Perišić (Kom), Internacional vs. Kom 2–9, 18.05.2024 (season 2023–24)
- Highest single game attendance: 4,000, Ibar vs. Lovćen 0:1, 11.04.2007, Rožaje (season 2006–07); Jedinstvo vs. Arsenal 1:1, 13.04.2022, Bijelo Polje (season 2021–22)

=== Attendance by season ===
Season	Avg	Overall	M	H	CH	CL
2006–07	485	94,620	195	4,000	Ibar (1,524)	Bratstvo (128)
2007–08	579	113,550	196	3,000	Jezero (1,935)	Bratstvo (144)
2008–09	331	65,500	198	2,000	Ibar (765)	Bratstvo (128)
2009–10	356	70,450	198	1,500	Jezero (738)	Zabjelo (166)
2010–11	507	98,950	195	2,000	Ibar (1,207)	Zabjelo (163)
2011–12	367	71,650	195	2,000	Čelik (729)	Bratstvo (159)
2012–13	319	52,600	165	1,500	Jezero (647)	Iskra (153)
2013–14	359	71,150	198	2,500	Jezero (818)	Bratstvo (141)
2014–15	360	68,350	190	2,500	Iskra (912)	Cetinje (147)
2015–16	364	60,050	165	2,000	Jezero (733)	Bratstvo (83)
2016–17	347	56,950	164	2,000	Ibar (1,050)	Bratstvo (75)
2017–18	312	59,200	190	1,500	Jedinstvo (468)	Čelik (93)
2018–19	317	56,150	177	1,000	Jedinstvo (406)	Igalo (139)
2019–20	359	36,550	102	1,500	Dečić (736)	Drezga (164)
2020–21	Without attendance due to the coronavirus pandemic					
2021–22	301	53,250	177	4,000	Jedinstvo (947)	Cetinje (125)
2022–23	270	43,750	162	1,500	Berane (712)	Internacional (156)
2023–24	283	50,440	178	2,000	Otrant (572)	Internacional (102)

M = Number of matches (only matches with spectators counted); H = Highest attendance on one match; CH = Club with highest average attendance; CL = Club with lowest average attendance

== Current clubs (2025–26) ==
The 2025–26 Montenegrin Second League is the 20th season of second-tier football competition in Montenegro. The season started in August 2025 and will end in May 2026.
The following 10 clubs compete in Second League 2025–26.

Club	City	Finishing in 2024–25	Stadium	Floodlights
Berane	Berane	1st in Third League – North	Berane City Stadium (6,500)	Yes
Grbalj	Radanovići	6th	Stadion Donja Sutvara (1,500)	No
Igalo	Igalo	4th	Stadion Solila (1,600)	No
Internacional	Podgorica	1st in Third League – Center	Camp FSCG (1,250)	Yes
Iskra	Danilovgrad	5th	Braća Velašević Stadium (2,500)	Yes
Kom	Podgorica	8th	Stadion Zlatica (1,200)	Yes
Lovćen	Cetinje	3rd	Stadion Sveti Petar Cetinjski (5,192)	Yes
Otrant-Olympic	Ulcinj	10th in First League	Stadion Olympic (1,500)	No
Podgorica	Podgorica	7th	DG Arena (4,300)	Yes
Rudar	Pljevlja	2nd	Stadion pod Golubinjom (5,140)	Yes

== Logo and broadcasting ==
=== Official logo and equipment ===
Logo of Montenegrin Second League was presented in 2018, together with the new logos of Montenegrin First League, Montenegrin Cup and youth leagues.
Official ball of competition is produced under the Derbystar brand, while the official equipment of referees is product of Legea.

=== Broadcasting rights ===
Since foundation of the competition, official broadcaster of Second Montenegrin League matches is national television of Montenegro – RTCG.
From season 2018–19, broadcaster of matches is cable-network channel MNE Sport TV. Every weekend, one game is broadcast on their channels.

== See also ==
- Montenegrin First League playoffs
- Montenegrin Cup
- Montenegrin First League
- Montenegrin Third League
- Football in Montenegro
- Montenegrin clubs in Yugoslav football competitions (1946-2006)
