= FK Ribnica =

Football club in Konik, Montenegro

FK Ribnica Konik
- Full name: Fudbalski klub Ribnica
- Nickname: 'Lavovi' (Lions)
- Founded: 1974
- Ground: Camp FSCG, Podgorica, Montenegro
- Capacity: 1,050
- Chairman: (Montenegro) Dragan Pavićević
- Manager: (Montenegro) Boško Gazivoda
- League: Montenegrin Third League
- 2024–25: Montenegrin Third League, 9th of 11
Home colours	Away colours

Fudbalski klub Ribnica (English: Football Club Ribnica Konik) is a football club from Konik, Podgorica, Montenegro. They currently compete in the Montenegrin Third League – Center.

== History ==
=== Period 1974–2006 ===
FK Ribnica was founded in 1974, at Konik, the biggest settlement of Podgorica. There were several sports teams by the same name, but they no longer exist. The club is named after the Ribnica river, which flows through the Konik and Podgorica center.
During the seventies, Ribnica played in the Fourth League – Central region (lowest rank in SFR Yugoslavia). At that time, big rivalry between FK Ribnica and neighbouring FK Grafičar was born.
In the 1983–84 season, Ribnica won the title of the Fourth League – Central region champion, after 24 weeks long competition with the teams Grafičar, Gorštak, Kom, Zora, Napredak, Avijatičar, Radnički, Crvena zvijezda, Metalac, Partizan, Poštar and Bratstvo. With that success, FK Ribnica, for the first time in club history, gained promotion to the Montenegrin Republic League.
After six consecutive seasons in the Republic League, the biggest success at that time, FK Ribnica made on season 1990–91. Finished as a second-placed team in Montenegrin Republic League, Ribnica was promoted to the Yugoslav Third Inter-Republic League – West. During that season in Republic League, FK Ribnica scored 71 goals in 26 games, which was an absolute record in the team's history.
The club participated in the Yugoslav Third League for one season (1991–92), finished in 16th position. After that, FK Ribnica was relegated to the Montenegrin Republic League.
At FR Yugoslavia era (1992–2006), FK Ribnica played majority of seasons in the Montenegrin Republic League (third-tier competition), but never again gained promotion to federal competitions (Second league). In the 1994–95 season, FK Ribnica made the biggest victory in team history, against FK Tekstilac (9–1).
After the 2003–04 season, placed in 14th position, FK Ribnica was relegated from the Montenegrin Republic League after 20 consecutive seasons. At the end of that season, the team lost against FK Berane away with 1–11, which was the biggest defeat of FK Ribnica until then.
During the 1990s and the first half of the 2000s, FK Ribnica started their careers many famous players from Montenegro, as Vukašin Poleksić, Srđan Kljajević, Senad Rizvanaj, Ivan Čarapić, Saša Ivanović and others.

=== Period 2006–present ===
After Montenegrin independence, FK Ribnica became a member of the Montenegrin Third League. During the seasons 2006–07 and 2007–08, FK Ribnica won the trophy of the Central Region Cup winner and participated in the Montenegrin Cup seasons 2006–07, 2007–08 and 2008–09.
In the 2007–08 season, FK Ribnica won the title of the Third Montenegrin League – Central champion and in the playoffs against FK Mornar and FK Polimlje, they gained promotion to the Montenegrin Second League, which was the historical success for the club. FK Ribnica played only one season in the Second League, finishing as a last-placed team in season 2008–09. In May 2009, FK Ribnica was defeated against FK Otrant in Ulcinj, 2–12. That was the highest defeat in the history of Montenegrin Second League.
After one year in higher rank, FK Ribnica was relegated to the Third League, where they are still playing.
Last success FK Ribnica made at Montenegrin Cup 2013–14 season. As a bottom-league member, they eliminated a member of the Second League, FK Igalo in first leg (3–1), but were defeated in the Round of 16 against First League side OFK Grbalj (1–3; 1–3).

=== FK Ribnica in Montenegrin Second League ===
FK Ribnica played one season in the Montenegrin Second League – 2008/09. During its 33 weeks, Ribnica made two wins and four draws with 27 defeats. With only 10 points earned, FK Ribnica made a record with negative score since the Montenegrin Second League was established. Except that, FK Ribnica made few another negative records in the history of the Second League – as a lowest number of wins at one season (2), highest number of losses (27), highest number of conceded goals (82), longest run without wins (14 games), longest losing streak (14 games) and biggest defeat (vs. FK Otrant 2–12).

Season	Place	M	W	D	L	GD	PTS
2008/09.	12	33	2	4	27	16:82	10

=== FK Ribnica in Yugoslav federal competitions ===
FK Ribnica spent the 1991–92 season in the Yugoslav Third Inter-Republic League – West. That was the only season in history that FK Ribnica played in Yugoslav federal competitions. Below is the table of the season.

Yugoslav Third League – West 1991–92
Team	M	W	D	L	GD	PTS
Rudar Pljevlja	34	23	6	5	80:35	52
Mladost Lučani	34	21	4	9	70:29	46
Novi Pazar	34	20	4	10	58:25	44
Sloga Kraljevo	34	18	5	11	46:28	41
Zastava Kragujevac	34	15	10	9	54:29	40
Šumadija Aranđelovac	34	16	6	12	44:34	38
Rudar Stari Trg	34	16	5	13	38:41	37
Bokelj Kotor	34	16	4	14	63:46	36
Lovćen Cetinje	34	13	9	12	38:48	35
Berane	34	11	10	13	36:44	32
Budućnost Peć	34	14	4	16	33:56	32
Mornar Bar	34	12	9	13	37:41	33
Mladost Podgorica	34	12	6	16	43:40	30
FAP Priboj	34	12	6	16	44:48	30
Polimlje Prijepolje	34	11	7	16	44:53	29
Ribnica Podgorica	34	13	2	19	34:63	28
Trepča Kosovska Mitrovica	34	9	6	19	37:72	24
Prvi Partizan Užice	34	1	2	31	19:87	4

=== Seasons in Montenegrin Republic League ===
Below is a score of FK Ribnica by every single season in the Montenegrin Republic League. They spent overall 19 seasons in the Republic League, which was, at majority of period, the third tier of football competition in SFR Yugoslavia and FR Yugoslavia.

Season	Place	M	W	D	L	GD	PTS
1984/85.	12	30	8	13	9	33:30	29
1985/86.	8	30	11	8	11	36:32	30
1986/87.	12	26	6	10	10	24:37	22
1987/88.	7	30	9	10	11	34:37	28
1988/89.	10	28	9	6	13	36:48	24
1989/90.	5	32	12	12	8	42:38	36
1990/91.	2	26	19	1	6	71:32	39
1992/93.	5	26	10	8	8	48:39	28
1993/94.	6	34	14	10	10	51:35	38
1994/95.	5	34	18	9	7	66:30	63

Season	Place	M	W	D	L	GD	PTS
1995/96.	13	34	10	9	15	32:55	39
1996/97.	10	30	11	5	14	37:41	38
1997/98.	6	30	12	5	13	43:44	41
1998/99.	7	30	11	5	14	47:52	38
1999/00.	9	28	10	6	12	42:45	36
2000/01.	3	34	21	8	5	69:29	71
2001/02.	14	34	10	4	20	28:43	34
2002/03.	9	30	11	7	12	31:41	40
2003/04.	14	30	5	4	21	20:62	19

== Honours and achievements ==
- Montenegrin Third League – 1
  - winners (1): 2007–08
- Montenegrin Republic League – 0
  - runner-up (1): 1990–91
- Montenegrin Fourth League – 1
  - winners (1): 1983–84
- Central Region Cup – 2
  - winners (2): 2005–06, 2006–07

== Current squad ==
Below is the squad of FK Ribnica for Montenegrin Third League 2016–17 season. Note: Flags indicate national team as defined under FIFA eligibility rules; some limited exceptions apply. Players may hold more than one non-FIFA nationality.

No.	Pos.	Nation	Player
1	FW	MNE	Miloš Vujović
2	DF	MNE	Dražen Pejović
6	DF	MNE	Nikola Martinović
7	MF	MNE	Milić Popović
8	DF	MNE	Savo Rolović
9	MF	MNE	Nemanja Samardžić
10	FW	MNE	Stevan Pekić
11	MF	MNE	Giovanni Quartulli

No.	Pos.	Nation	Player
14	MF	MNE	Vladimir Vujošević
18	MF	MNE	Miroslav Turković
19	MF	MNE	Mihailo Milić
20	MF	MNE	Damir Avdijaj
22	MF	MNE	Velibor Vuković
3	DF	MNE	Anel Markišić
30	FW	MNE	Vojislav Vasović
80	FW	MNE	Aleksandar Paljević

Coach: Boško Gazivoda

== Stadium ==
FK Ribnica plays their home games at Camp FSCG. Previously, from 1974 to 2010, the team had their own Stadion na Koniku, with a capacity of 750 seats. In 2010, after the expansion of quarter buildings, the old stadium was demolished.

== Women's Football Club ==
From 2009, FK Ribnica founded a Women's Football Club Ribnica (ŽFK Ribnica). The team played for two seasons in the Montenegrin Women's League (2010–11; 2011–12).

== See also ==
- Camp FSCG
- Montenegrin Third League
- Football in Montenegro
- Montenegrin clubs in Yugoslav football competitions (1946–2006)
- Podgorica
