= FK Bratstvo Cijevna =

FK Bratstvo
- Full name: Fudbalski klub Bratstvo Cijevna
- Founded: 1975
- Ground: Stadion Ljajkovići; Zeta, Montenegro
- Capacity: 0
- Manager: Milan Ražnatović
- League: Second League
- 2016-17: 11th
Home colours	Away colours

FK Bratstvo is a Montenegrin football club based in Ljajkovići (Zeta Plain), a suburb of Podgorica. The club was founded in 1975 and currently competes in the Montenegrin Third League. One of the first coaches:Terzic Slobodan

== History ==
Founded in 1975, FK Bratstvo is a second football team from the territory of Urban Municipality of Golubovci (part of Podgorica Capital). Oldest and much successful is FK Zeta.
From their beginnings, FK Bratstvo played in the Fourth League - Central, but without any significant results during the SFR Yugoslavia era. Their first biggest success came during the 1995–96 season. FK Bratstvo won the title in the Fourth League and gained its first-ever promotion to Montenegrin Republic League.
The team spent 10 consecutive seasons in Republic League. During that time, at February 2003, FK Bratstvo made biggest result on one single game, by eliminating strongest Montenegrin side FK Budućnost from Montenegrin Republic Cup first round.
After Montenegrin independence, FK Bratstvo became a member of Montenegrin Second League. From 2007, the team was moved from the old stadium in Cijevna village to neighbouring Ljajkovići. All the time since 2006, FK Bratstvo spent in Second League.
Historical results of FK Bratstvo came on seasons 2009-10 and 2015-16, when the team finished at third place, which gained them playoffs for First League. On 2009–10 First League playoffs, FK Bratstvo lost against FK Mornar (0–1; 1–2). Six years after that, Bratstvo lost another chance for historical First League promotion, after 2015-16 playoff games against FK Iskra (2–2; 0–6).
On season 2016–17, FK Bratstvo finished as a last-placed team. So, after 11 consecutive seasons in the Second League, they were relegated to the third-tier competition.

== Honours and achievements ==
- Montenegrin Fourth League
  - Champions (1): 1995–96

== Current squad ==
Note: Flags indicate national team as defined under FIFA eligibility rules; some limited exceptions apply. Players may hold more than one non-FIFA nationality.

No.	Pos.	Nation	Player
—	GK	MNE	Blazo Bakrać
—	GK	MNE	Slobodan Asanović
7	DF	MNE	Ivan Gazivoda
—	DF	MNE	Igor Kuć
—	MF	MNE	Edis Jasavić
—	DF	MNE	Marko Kažić
5	DF	MNE	Blažo Šoć
8	FW	MNE	Ivan Maraš
—	MF	MNE	Drazen Andjusić

No.	Pos.	Nation	Player
—	MF	MNE	Marko Golubović
14	MF	MNE	Stefan Otašević
—	MF	MNE	Mirko Spasojević
—	MF	MNE	Djordjije Vukcević
9	FW	MNE	Siniša Stanisavić
—	MF	MNE	Kustrim Arifi
—	FW	MNE	Ivan Tomašević
—	FW	MNE	Đorđije Vukčević
—	FW	MNE	Backo Belojevic

== Stadium ==
Until 2007, FK Bratstvo played their home games in the village of Cijevna, near the Aluminium Plant Podgorica. But, during the 2007, new stadium was built in neighbouring village Ljajkovići. Since then, FK Bratstvo plays all their games at Ljajkovići stadium.
The stadium meets criteria for Second League games, but not for top-league matches.

== See also ==
- Stadion Ljajkovići
- Golubovci
- Zeta Plain
- Podgorica
- Montenegrin Second League
- Montenegrin clubs in Yugoslav football competitions (1946–2006)
