= Stadion Sveti Petar Cetinjski =

Coordinates: 42.3925775°N 18.9244008°E

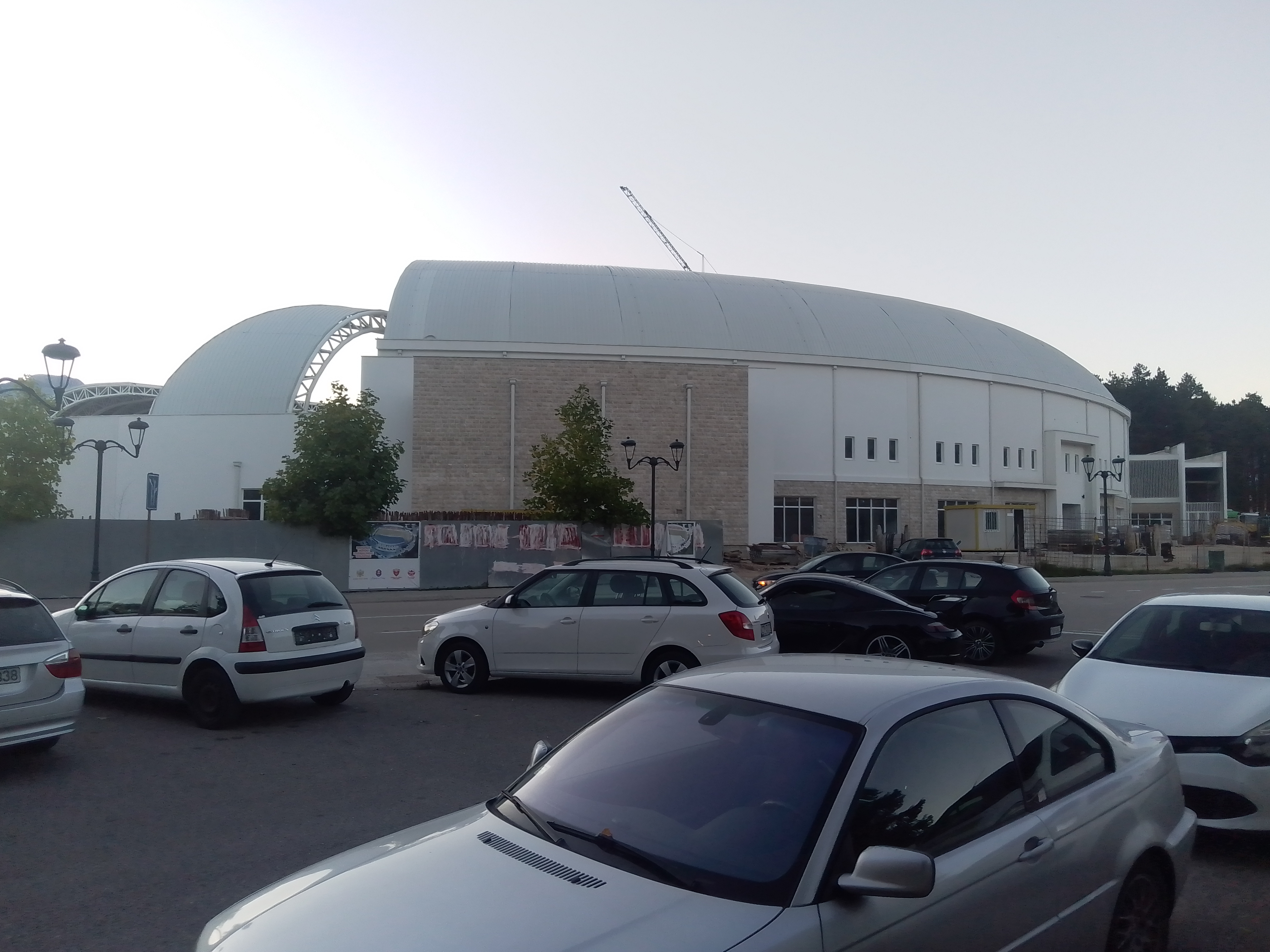
- Interactive map of Stadion Sveti Petar Cetinjski
- Location: Obilića poljana bb, Cetinje, Montenegro
- Owner: Old Royal Capital Cetinje
- Operator: Old Royal Capital Cetinje
- Capacity: 5,192
- Surface: Grass
- Record attendance: 6,500 (FK Lovćen - NK Dinamo Zagreb, 1971)
- Field size: 110 x 65 metres

Construction
- Built: 1957
- Opened: 1957
- Renovated: 2017–2022

Tenants
- FK Lovćen (1957–present); FK Cetinje (1975–present); ŽFK Lovćen (2010–present)

Stadium Sveti Petar Cetinjski (Montenegrin: Stadion Sveti Petar Cetinjski) is a football-specific stadium constructed in 2022 in Cetinje, Montenegro. It is the same site on which there was a historic venue called Stadion Obilića Poljana which opened in 1957 and was used until 2017. Upon its completion, the new stadium will be used by Cetinje's local football teams as well as the Montenegro national football team. It was named after Petar I Petrović-Njegoš.

== History ==
The first stadium in Cetinje was built in 1913, near the location of Obilića Poljana. From 1943 to 1957, the stadium was relocated near the Cetinje Monastery, and during the summer of 1957, the newer Stadion Obilića Poljana was opened. The first game on Obilića Poljana was a Yugoslav Second League match between FK Lovćen and NK GOŠK, played in August 1957.

The highest attendance in the history of stadium was recorded during a Yugoslav Cup game between FK Lovćen and NK Dinamo Zagreb in 1971. It was attended by 6,500 spectators. In 2016, the stadium had a capacity for 2,000 people.

=== New stadium construction (2017-2022) ===
In 2014, the first documentation for a new stadium on the current location Obilića Poljana was drafted. The new stadium was named after Montenegrin ruler Sveti Petar Cetinjski. The new stadium was built to meet UEFA standards, with a capacity of 5,192 seats. The investors of the project were the Old Royal Capital Cetinje, the Government of Montenegro, and the Football Association of Montenegro. Construction officially started on November 17, 2017. The project costed approximately €9 million in total.

== Tenants ==
The clubs which have played their home games at Stadion Sveti Petar Cetinjski are:

- 1957–present: FK Lovćen
- 1975–present: FK Cetinje
- 2010–present: ŽFK Lovćen

Except that, the stadium is used by Athletic Club Lovćen.
