= Gradski stadion (Bijelo Polje) =

Multi-purpose stadium in Bijelo Polje, Montenegro

Coordinates: 43°01′49.4″N 19°44′32.7″E

- Interactive map of Gradski stadion (Bijelo Polje)
- Full name: Gradski stadion
- Location: Bijelo Polje, Montenegro
- Owner: Municipality of Bijelo Polje
- Capacity: 4,000
- Surface: grass
- Field size: 110 m × 70 m (360 ft × 230 ft)

Construction
- Built: 1945
- Renovated: 2005

Tenants
- FK Jedinstvo (1945-present), FK Tekstilac (1963-2014), OFK Borac (2015-present)

Gradski stadion is a football stadium in Bijelo Polje, Montenegro. It is currently used for football matches and is the home ground of FK Jedinstvo, FK Tekstilac and OFK Borac. The stadium holds 4,000 people.

== History ==
FK Jedinstvo played home games at the location of Gradski stadion since 1945. Following promotion of FK Jedinstvo to First League of Serbia and Montenegro, the stadium was renovated in 2005, with 3,000 seats on the main stand and 1,000 seats on the other stand.

== Pitch and conditions ==
The pitch measures 110 x 70 meters. The stadium didn't met UEFA criteria for European competitions. At the north side of stadium is situated indoor sports hall 'Nikoljac'.

== See also ==
- FK Jedinstvo Bijelo Polje
- FK Tekstilac
- OFK Borac Bijelo Polje
- Bijelo Polje
