= Stadion Zlatica =

Football stadium in Podgorica, Montenegro

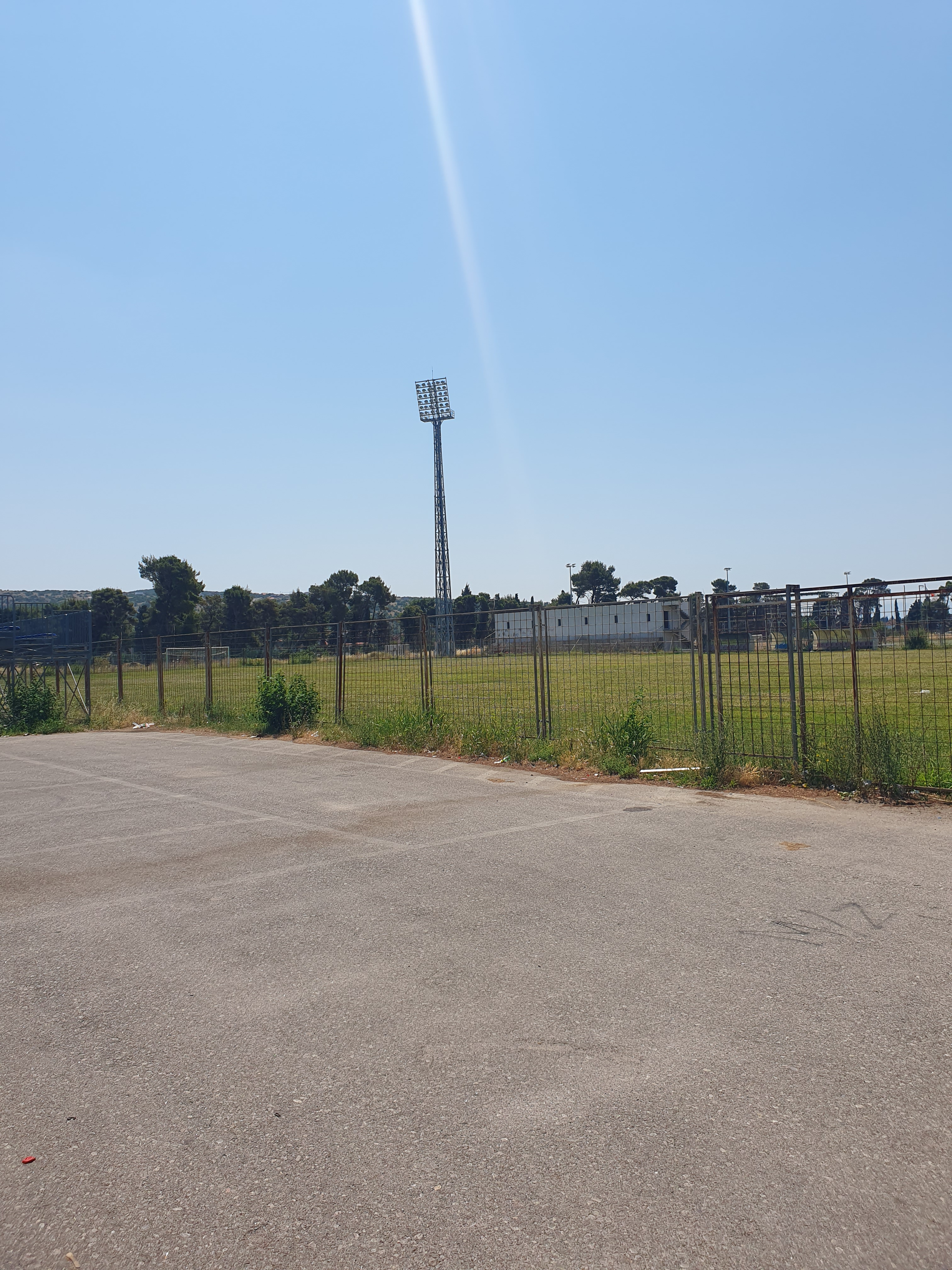
- Interactive map of Stadion Zlatica
- Full name: Stadion Zlatica
- Location: Podgorica, Montenegro
- Coordinates: 42°27′54.4″N 19°17′42.6″E
- Owner: FK Kom
- Capacity: 1,200
- Surface: grass
- Field size: 110x70

Construction
- Built: 2016
- Cost: 2,5 million euros

Tenant
- FK Kom

Stadion Zlatica is a football stadium in Zlatica, a suburb of Podgorica Capital, Montenegro. It is used for football matches and is the home ground of FK Kom.

== History ==
The current stadium in Zlatica was built in 2016. It is situated near the old field, which was demolished during 2015.
The new football stadium in Zlatica has a capacity of 1,200 seats. With numerous facilities and another training pitch, the stadium meets the criteria for official games in every national competition.

=== Old ground ===
Previously, in period between 1958 and 2015, FK Kom played home games at an old field, near the new stadium. The old stadium had a capacity of 800 seats.

== Pitch and conditions ==
The pitch measures 110 x 70 meters. The stadium didn't met UEFA criteria for European competitions, but meets all criteria for official games in all national competitions.
In addition to the main field is an auxiliary field with artificial grass that is used for competitions in the youth categories.

== See also ==
- FK Kom
- Podgorica
