= Berane City Stadium =

Multi-purpose stadium in Berane, Montenegro

- Стадион под Богавским брдом / Stadion pod Bogavskim brdom
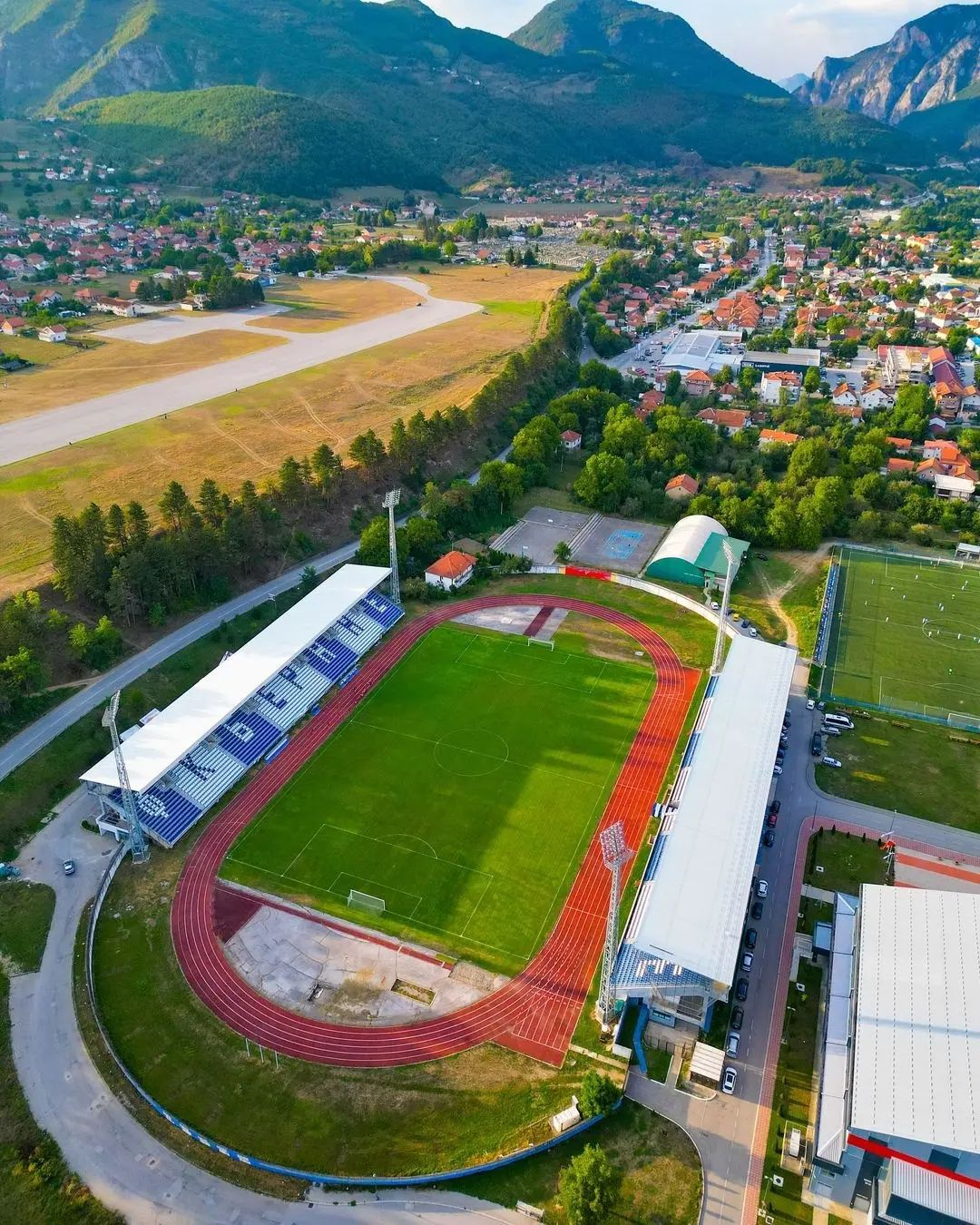
- Interactive map of Berane City Stadium
- Full name: Berane City Stadium
- Location: Vlada Martinovića, Berane, Montenegro
- Coordinates: 42.843324°N 19.866268°E
- Owner: Berane Municipality
- Operator: FK Berane
- Capacity: 7,466
- Surface: Grass
- Field size: 105 m × 70 m (344 ft × 230 ft)

Construction
- Opened: 1981
- Renovated: 2024

Tenants
- FK Berane (1975–present); FK Radnički (2012–present)

Berane City Stadium (Montenegrin: Gradski stadion Berane/Градски стадион Беране) is a multi-purpose stadium in Berane, Montenegro. Also known as Stadion pod Bogavskim brdom, it is currently used mostly for football matches and is the home ground of FK Berane and FK Radnički. Also it serves as home ground of Athletic Club Lim.

== History ==
Stadium was built in 1981 for purposes of hosting Inter-municipalities Youth Sports Games also known as the MOSI Games (Montenegrinn: Međuopštinske omladinske sportske igre/Међународне омладинске спортске игре). At that time, capacity of two new stands was 11,000 seats.
During the 2017, Football Association of Montenegro started the renovation of the stadium. New stand with seats, roofs, dressing rooms and offices which meets UEFA criteria were opened in September 2018. After the works, capacity of stadium was reduced to 6,500 seats.

== Pitch and conditions ==
The pitch measures 105 x 70 meters. Between the stands and pitch, there is an athletic track.
There is one additional pitch with artificial turf near the main stadium. New Berane sports hall, built in 2017, is situated in front of the Berane City Stadium.

== See also ==
- FK Berane
- FK Radnički Berane
- Berane
- Montenegrin Second League
