= Stadion pod Vrmcem =

Football stadium in Kotor, Montenegro

- Interactive map of Stadion pod Vrmcem
- Full name: Stadion pod Vrmcem
- Location: Kotor, Montenegro
- Coordinates: 42.420295°N 18.764979°E
- Owner: Municipality of Kotor
- Capacity: 425
- Surface: grass
- Field size: 110 x 70 m

Construction
- Built: 1922
- Renovated: 1960
- Expanded: 2004

Tenant
- FK Bokelj

Stadion Pod Vrmcem is a football stadium in Kotor, Montenegro. It is used mostly for football matches and is the home ground of FK Bokelj. The stadium holds 425 people.

== History ==
The first football ground in Kotor was situated at Rakite suburb, near the Adriatic coast. At the same location, after 1945, a new ground was built. The stadium was renovated few times. It's situated near the beach in Bay of Kotor and it's the home ground of FK Bokelj. Except Bokelj's matches, at the Stadion pod Vrmcem, every year is playing final match of Nikša Bućin Cup, competition for Third League clubs from south Montenegro.
The stadium has one stand, with a capacity of 425 seats.

== Pitch and conditions ==
The pitch measures 110 x 70 meters. The stadium didn't met UEFA criteria for European competitions. In addition to the main field is an auxiliary field with artificial grass that is used for competitions in the junior categories.

== See also ==
- FK Bokelj
- Kotor
