= 1958–59 Montenegrin Republic League =

Montenegrin Republic League
- Season: 1958–59
- Dates: April – May 1959
- Champions: Mladost Titograd
- Matches: 6
- Goals: 21 (3.5 per match)

The 1958–59 Montenegrin Republic League was 14th season of Montenegrin Republic League. Similar to season 1956–57 League was organised as tournament, during the April and May 1959.

== Season ==
Locations of the 1958–59 Montenegrin Republic League teams

Following the big changes in the structure of Yugoslav Second League, a majority of Montenegrin teams were relegated from Federal competitions after the 1957–58 season. So, overall 18 clubs were interested to play in 1958–59 Montenegrin Republic League. Due to that fact, Football Association of Montenegro organised regional qualifiers and winners of three qualifying groups gained placement to final tournament of Montenegrin Republic League.

=== Qualifiers ===
In the qualifiers, 18 teams were placed into three regional groups. Winners of the groups (Mladost, Rudar and Arsenal) qualified for Montenegrin Republic League. Below are the final tables of each qualifying group.

Center
Pos	Team	Pts
1	Mladost Titograd	17
2	Sloga	14
3	Zora	13
4	Čelik	10
5	Dečić	3
6	Poštar	3

North
Pos	Team	Pts
1	Rudar	18
2	Gorštak	14
3	Jedinstvo Bijelo Polje	12
4	Ibar	10
5	Radnički Ivangrad	4
6	Brskovo	2

South
Pos	Team	Pts
1	Arsenal	8
2	Bokelj	6
3	Igalo	6
4	Sloga Stari Bar	3
5	Mornar	2
6	Jedinstvo Herceg Novi	1

=== Championship ===
At the finals, every team played four games and the winner went to qualifiers for Yugoslav Second League.
Title holder was Mladost Titograd, who finished season with three wins and one draw. Rudar was excluded from the championship, due to fact that in their team participated unregistered players. Because of that, three games of Rudar were registered with result 0-3.

Pos	Team	Pld	W	D	L	GF	GA	GD	Pts	MLA	ARS	RUD
1	Mladost (C, Q)	4	3	1	0	12	3	+9	7		4–2	4–0
2	Arsenal	4	2	1	1	9	5	+4	5	1–1		3–0
3	Rudar	4	0	0	4	0	13	−13	0	0–3	0–3	

(C) Champions; (Q) Place in qualifiers for 1959–60 Yugoslav Second League

=== Qualifiers for Yugoslav Second League ===
In the qualifiers for 1959–60 Second League – East, Mladost finished as a last-placed team in the group with Pobeda Prilep, Sloboda Titovo Užice and Priština. With that result, team from Titograd remained in Montenegrin Republic League.

== Higher leagues ==
On season 1958–69, three Montenegrin teams played in higher leagues of SFR Yugoslavia. Budućnost was a member of 1958–59 Yugoslav First League, while Sutjeska and Lovćen played in 1959–60 Yugoslav Second League.

== See also ==
- Montenegrin Republic League
- Montenegrin Republic Cup (1947–2006)
- Montenegrin clubs in Yugoslav football competitions (1946–2006)
- Montenegrin Football Championship (1922–1940)
