= 1975–76 Montenegrin Republic League =

Montenegrin Republic League
- Season: 1975–76
- Dates: August 1975 - June 1976
- Champions: Jedinstvo
- Relegated: Zabjelo; Jezero; Partizan Momišići; Gorštak
- Matches: 240
- Goals: 669 (2.79 per match)

The 1975–76 Montenegrin Republic League was the 31st season of Montenegrin Republic League. The season started in August 1975 and finished in June 1976.

== Season ==
Locations of the 1975-76 Montenegrin Republic League teams

Just like during the year before, in Montenegrin Republic League played 16 teams. Among the teams which didn't play on previous season were Kotor (relegated from Yugoslav Second League) and three best teams from Regional leagues - Mogren, Spuž and Jezero.
After 30 weeks, the title won Jedinstvo, with seven points more than second and third-placed Zeta and Mogren. Due to fact that two Montenegrin teams were relegated from Yugoslav Second League 1975–76, this time four last-placed clubs from Montenegrin Republic League went to the bottom-tier.

=== Table ===
Pos	Team	Pld	W	D	L	GF	GA	GD	Pts
1	Jedinstvo (C, P)	30	19	5	6	68	32	+36	43
2	Zeta	30	15	6	9	50	27	+23	36
3	Mogren	30	14	8	8	36	27	+9	36
4	Tekstilac	30	14	5	11	41	37	+4	33
5	Čelik	30	14	4	12	55	52	+3	32
6	Spuž	30	12	8	10	39	36	+3	32
7	Grafičar	30	9	13	8	28	33	−5	31
8	Rudar	30	13	4	13	46	41	+5	30
9	Iskra	30	11	8	11	40	40	0	30
10	Petrovac	30	11	8	11	43	47	−4	30
11	Arsenal	30	12	5	13	40	34	+6	29
12	Kotor	30	8	13	9	30	34	−4	29
13	Zabjelo (R)	30	10	7	13	45	50	−5	27
14	Jezero (R)	30	12	1	17	43	63	−20	25
15	Partizan Momišići (R)	30	9	4	17	36	55	−19	22
16	Gorštak (R)	30	5	7	18	29	61	−32	17

(C) Champions; (P) Promoted; (R) Relegated

== Higher leagues ==
On season 1975–76, four Montenegrin teams played in higher leagues of SFR Yugoslavia. Budućnost participated in 1975–76 Yugoslav First League, while three other teams (Sutjeska, Lovćen and Titograd) participated in 1975–76 Yugoslav Second League.

== See also ==
- Montenegrin Republic League
- Montenegrin Republic Cup (1947–2006)
- Montenegrin clubs in Yugoslav football competitions (1946–2006)
- Montenegrin Football Championship (1922–1940)
