= 1977–78 Montenegrin Republic League =

Association football league in Yugoslavia

Montenegrin Republic League
- Season: 1977–78
- Dates: August 1977 - May 1978
- Champions: Jedinstvo
- Relegated: Zabjelo; Ivangrad; Spuž; Grafičar; Štampar
- Matches played: 240
- Goals scored: 583 (2.43 per match)

The 1977–78 Montenegrin Republic League was the 33rd season of Montenegrin Republic League, the third tier of the Yugoslav football league system. The season started in August 1977 and finished in May 1978 with Jedinstvo being champions.

== Summary ==
Locations of the 1977-78 Montenegrin Republic League teams

Sixteen teams participated in the 1977-78 season. Among the clubs which didn't play in the previous season were Jedinstvo (relegated from Yugoslav Second League) and three best teams from Regional leagues - Ivangrad, Štampar and Zabjelo.

Jedinstvo won the title with a gap of five points over second place, OFK Petrovac. After the decision of reducing number of participants in 1978–79, the league saw five teams relegated to the bottom tier as the league was reduced to 14 teams.

=== Table ===
| Pos | Team | Pld | W | D | L | GF | GA | GD | Pts |
|---|---|---|---|---|---|---|---|---|---|
| 1 | Jedinstvo (C, P) | 30 | 19 | 4 | 7 | 50 | 23 | +27 | 42 |
| 2 | Petrovac | 28 | 13 | 11 | 4 | 39 | 32 | +7 | 37 |
| 3 | Titograd | 30 | 12 | 10 | 8 | 43 | 32 | +11 | 34 |
| 4 | Tekstilac | 30 | 12 | 9 | 9 | 41 | 28 | +13 | 33 |
| 5 | Zeta | 30 | 12 | 9 | 9 | 34 | 31 | +3 | 33 |
| 6 | Kotor | 30 | 13 | 6 | 11 | 38 | 33 | +5 | 32 |
| 7 | Mogren | 30 | 11 | 10 | 9 | 27 | 28 | −1 | 32 |
| 8 | Arsenal | 30 | 13 | 5 | 12 | 47 | 32 | +15 | 31 |
| 9 | Čelik | 30 | 9 | 13 | 8 | 37 | 34 | +3 | 31 |
| 10 | Iskra | 30 | 12 | 7 | 11 | 46 | 44 | +2 | 31 |
| 11 | Dečić | 30 | 12 | 7 | 11 | 36 | 39 | −3 | 31 |
| 12 | Zabjelo (R) | 30 | 10 | 10 | 10 | 36 | 43 | −7 | 30 |
| 13 | Ivangrad (R) | 30 | 10 | 8 | 12 | 34 | 35 | −1 | 28 |
| 14 | Spuž (R) | 30 | 11 | 3 | 16 | 34 | 43 | −9 | 25 |
| 15 | Grafičar (R) | 30 | 9 | 6 | 15 | 24 | 43 | −19 | 24 |
| 16 | Štampar (R) | 30 | 1 | 4 | 25 | 17 | 92 | −75 | 6 |

(C) Champions; (P) Promoted; (R) Relegated

== Higher leagues ==
In the 1977-78 season, three Montenegrin teams played in the higher leagues of SFR Yugoslavia. Budućnost participated in 1977–78 Yugoslav First League, with two other teams (Sutjeska and Lovćen) participated in 1977–78 Yugoslav Second League.

== See also ==
- Montenegrin Republic League
- Montenegrin Republic Cup (1947–2006)
- Montenegrin clubs in Yugoslav football competitions (1946–2006)
- Montenegrin Football Championship (1922–1940)
