= 1960–61 Montenegrin Republic League =

Montenegrin Republic League
- Season: 1960–61
- Dates: April – May 1961
- Champions: Lovćen
- Matches: 6
- Goals: 38 (6.33 per match)

The 1960–61 Montenegrin Republic League was 16th season of Montenegrin Republic League. Similar to previous season League was organised as tournament, during the April and May 1961.

== Season ==
=== Qualifiers ===
In the qualifiers, 15 teams were divided into three regional groups. Winners of the groups (OFK Titograd, FK Jedinstvo and Bokelj) qualified for Montenegrin Republic League. Below are the final tables of each qualifying group.

Center
Pos	Team	Pts
1	OFK Titograd	15
2	Kom	13
3	Zmaj	11
4	Dečić	4
5	Čelik	4
6	Zora	0

North
Pos	Team	Pts
1	Jedinstvo	11
2	Gorštak	11
3	Rudar	9
4	Brskovo	6
5	Ibar	3

South
Pos	Team	Pts
1	Bokelj	8
2	Lovćen	7
3	Arsenal	3
4	Primorje	2

=== Championship ===
Locations of the 1960–61 Montenegrin Republic League teams

At the finals, every team played four games and the winner went to qualifiers for Yugoslav Second League.
Title holder was OFK Titograd, who finished season with all four wins.

==== Table ====
Pos	Team	Pld	W	D	L	GF	GA	GD	Pts
1	OFK Titograd (C, Q)	4	4	0	0	17	6	+11	8
2	Jedinstvo	4	1	1	2	13	14	−1	3
3	Bokelj	4	0	1	3	8	18	−10	1

(C) Champions; (Q) Place in qualifiers for 1961–62 Yugoslav Second League

=== Qualifiers for Yugoslav Second League ===
In the qualifiers for 1961–62 Second League – East, OFK Titograd was eliminated in Semifinals.

Phase	Team 1	Team 2	Home	Away
Semifinals	Pelister Bitola	OFK Titograd	7:2	0:0

== Higher leagues ==
On season 1960–61, two Montenegrin teams played in higher leagues of SFR Yugoslavia. Both of them (Budućnost and Sutjeska) participated in 1960–61 Yugoslav Second League.

== See also ==
- Montenegrin Republic League
- Montenegrin Republic Cup (1947–2006)
- Montenegrin clubs in Yugoslav football competitions (1946–2006)
- Montenegrin Football Championship (1922–1940)
