= 1976–77 Montenegrin Republic League =

Association football league in Yugoslavia

Montenegrin Republic League
- Season: 1976–77
- Dates: August 1976 - June 1977
- Champions: Sutjeska
- Relegated: Igalo; Rudar; Komovi
- Matches: 240
- Goals: 662 (2.76 per match)

The 1976–77 Montenegrin Republic League was the 32nd season of Montenegrin Republic League, the third tier of the Yugoslav football league system. The season started in August 1976 and finished in June 1977.

== Summary ==
Locations of the 1976-77 Montenegrin Republic League teams

16 teams participated in the 1976–77 season. Among the clubs which didn't play the previous season was Sutjeska and Titograd (relegated from Yugoslav Second League) and three best teams from Regional leagues - Igalo, Komovi and Dečić.

That was the first time since 1954–55 that Sutjeska, who's traditionally one of two strongest Montenegrin sides, played in Republic League. At the end of season they took out the title finishing four points ahead of second place Titograd. They also became the first team which won both the Montenegrin Republic League and the Montenegrin Republic Cup during the same season.

=== Table ===
| Pos | Team | Pld | W | D | L | GF | GA | GD | Pts |
|---|---|---|---|---|---|---|---|---|---|
| 1 | Sutjeska (C, P) | 30 | 24 | 2 | 4 | 90 | 15 | +75 | 50 |
| 2 | Titograd | 30 | 19 | 8 | 3 | 48 | 20 | +28 | 46 |
| 3 | Petrovac | 30 | 13 | 7 | 10 | 47 | 31 | +16 | 33 |
| 4 | Čelik | 30 | 13 | 7 | 10 | 55 | 45 | +10 | 33 |
| 5 | Mogren | 30 | 12 | 8 | 10 | 38 | 48 | −10 | 32 |
| 6 | Kotor | 30 | 12 | 6 | 12 | 35 | 48 | −13 | 30 |
| 7 | Zeta | 30 | 11 | 6 | 13 | 40 | 26 | +14 | 28 |
| 8 | Arsenal | 30 | 11 | 5 | 14 | 40 | 39 | +1 | 27 |
| 9 | Dečić | 30 | 11 | 5 | 14 | 44 | 50 | −6 | 27 |
| 10 | Tekstilac | 30 | 12 | 3 | 15 | 33 | 40 | −7 | 27 |
| 11 | Iskra | 30 | 9 | 9 | 12 | 31 | 44 | −13 | 27 |
| 12 | Grafičar | 30 | 9 | 9 | 12 | 27 | 51 | −24 | 27 |
| 13 | Spuž | 30 | 10 | 6 | 14 | 42 | 54 | −12 | 26 |
| 14 | Igalo (R) | 30 | 9 | 8 | 13 | 26 | 42 | −16 | 26 |
| 15 | Rudar (R) | 30 | 9 | 7 | 14 | 33 | 51 | −18 | 25 |
| 16 | Komovi (R) | 30 | 6 | 4 | 20 | 33 | 71 | −38 | 16 |

(C) Champions; (P) Promoted; (R) Relegated

== Higher leagues ==
In the 1976–77 season, three Montenegrin teams played in the higher leagues of SFR Yugoslavia. Budućnost participated in 1976–77 Yugoslav First League, while two other teams (Lovćen and Jedinstvo) participated in 1976–77 Yugoslav Second League.

== See also ==
- Montenegrin Republic League
- Montenegrin Republic Cup (1947–2006)
- Montenegrin clubs in Yugoslav football competitions (1946–2006)
- Montenegrin Football Championship (1922–1940)
