= 1965–66 Montenegrin Republic League =

Montenegrin Republic League
- Season: 1965–66
- Dates: August 1965 - May 1966
- Champions: Rudar
- Relegated: Tekstilac
- Matches: 81
- Goals: 304 (3.75 per match)

The 1965–66 Montenegrin Republic League was 21st season of Montenegrin Republic League. Season started in August 1965 and finished in May 1966.

== Season ==
Locations of the 1965-66 Montenegrin Republic League teams

Except the teams from previous year, a new member of the competition were Dečić and Tekstilac. Dečić replaced a last placed team from previous season (Gorštak), while Tekstilac won the place emptied after the promotion of Lovćen to 1965-66 Second League.
At the end of 18 weeks long competition, Rudar with four points more than OFK Titograd. With that result, Rudar participated in the qualifiers for Yugoslav Second League.
After the autumn stage, Tekstilac withdrawn from competition due to technical difficulties.

=== Table ===
Pos	Team	Pld	W	D	L	GF	GA	GD	Pts
1	Rudar (C, Q)	17	13	2	2	65	13	+52	28
2	Titograd	17	10	4	3	41	17	+24	24
3	Jedinstvo	17	7	4	6	31	26	+5	18
4	Bokelj	17	7	4	6	37	39	−2	18
5	Dečić	17	8	2	7	35	37	−2	18
6	Ivangrad	17	5	6	6	21	28	−7	16
7	Iskra	17	7	1	9	32	37	−5	15
8	Arsenal	17	5	4	8	23	34	−11	14
9	Brskovo	17	3	5	9	14	42	−28	11
10	Tekstilac (R)	9	0	0	9	5	31	−26	0

(C) Champions; (Q) Place in qualifiers for 1966–67 Yugoslav Second League - East; (R) Relegated

=== Qualifiers for Yugoslav Second League ===
Rudar played in the qualifiers for 1966-67 Second League - East. Their opponent was a winner of Republic League of SR Macedonia - Rabotnički Skopje, who won both games.

Team 1	Team 2	Home	Away
Rabotnički Skopje	Rudar Pljevlja	6:0	2:0

== Higher leagues ==
On season 1965–66, three Montenegrin teams played in higher leagues of SFR Yugoslavia. All of them (Sutjeska, Budućnost and Lovćen) were participants of 1965–66 Yugoslav Second League.

== See also ==
- Montenegrin Republic League
- Montenegrin Republic Cup (1947–2006)
- Montenegrin clubs in Yugoslav football competitions (1946–2006)
- Montenegrin Football Championship (1922–1940)
