= 1973–74 Montenegrin Republic League =

Montenegrin Republic League
- Season: 1973–74
- Dates: August 1973 - June 1974
- Champions: Lovćen
- Relegated: Jezero; Mornar; Orjen
- Matches: 240
- Goals: 756 (3.15 per match)

The 1973–74 Montenegrin Republic League was the 29th season of Montenegrin Republic League. Season started in August 1973 and finished in June 1974.

== Season ==
Locations of the 1973-74 Montenegrin Republic League teams

Second time in two years, a number of participants is expanded, so on season 1973–74, in Montenegrin Republic League played 16 teams. Among the teams which didn't play on previous season were Lovćen, Jedinstvo and Rudar (relegated from Yugoslav Second League) and three best teams from Regional leagues - Orjen, Mladost Lješkopolje and Tekstilac.
After 30 weeks, the title won Lovćen, with 11 points more than second and third-placed Jedinstvo and Zeta.

=== Table ===
Pos	Team	Pld	W	D	L	GF	GA	GD	Pts
1	Lovćen (C, P)	30	25	2	3	87	18	+69	52
2	Jedinstvo	30	16	9	5	63	34	+29	41
3	Zeta	30	18	5	7	52	32	+20	41
4	Čelik	30	14	8	8	56	33	+23	36
5	Tekstilac	30	14	8	8	53	30	+23	36
6	Grafičar	30	14	6	10	35	27	+8	34
7	Petrovac	30	14	3	13	41	53	−12	31
8	Gorštak	30	12	3	15	49	43	+6	27
9	Zabjelo	30	10	7	13	36	48	−12	27
10	Mladost Lješkopolje	30	11	4	15	44	66	−22	26
11	Iskra	30	11	3	16	48	51	−3	25
12	Ibar	30	9	6	15	43	59	−16	24
13	Rudar	30	9	6	15	36	62	−26	24
14	Jezero (R)	30	9	4	17	42	66	−24	22
15	Mornar (R)	30	7	5	18	39	58	−19	19
16	Orjen (R)	30	6	3	21	32	77	−45	15

(C) Champions; (P) Promoted; (R) Relegated

== Higher leagues ==
On season 1973–74, four Montenegrin teams played in higher leagues of SFR Yugoslavia. All of them (Sutjeska, Budućnost, OFK Titograd and Bokelj) participated in 1973–74 Yugoslav Second League.

== See also ==
- Montenegrin Republic League
- Montenegrin Republic Cup (1947–2006)
- Montenegrin clubs in Yugoslav football competitions (1946–2006)
- Montenegrin Football Championship (1922–1940)
