= 1971–72 Montenegrin Republic League =

Montenegrin Republic League
- Season: 1971–72
- Dates: August 1971 - May 1972
- Champions: Jedinstvo
- Relegated: Brskovo; Kom
- Matches: 132
- Goals: 334 (2.53 per match)

The 1971–72 Montenegrin Republic League was 27th season of Montenegrin Republic League. Season started in August 1971 and finished in May 1972.

== Season ==
Locations of the 1971-72 Montenegrin Republic League teams

On season 1971–72, in Montenegrin Republic League participated 12 teams. Among the teams which didn't play during the previous season were three best teams from Regional leagues - Ibar, Brskovo and Grafičar.
After 22 weeks, the title won Jedinstvo. Second-placed was Rudar with equal number of points as Arsenal, but with better goal difference. So, Jedinstvo and Rudar gained promotion to Yugoslav Second League.
Two lowest ranked teams - Brskovo and Kom were relegated to Regional leagues (fourth level).

=== Table ===
Pos	Team	Pld	W	D	L	GF	GA	GD	Pts
1	Jedinstvo (C, P)	22	14	2	6	31	15	+16	30
2	Rudar (P)	22	11	6	5	41	20	+21	28
3	Arsenal	22	11	6	5	34	24	+10	28
4	Ibar	22	11	4	7	41	29	+12	26
5	Grafičar	22	9	6	7	27	23	+4	24
6	Mornar	22	10	3	9	26	33	−7	23
7	Zabjelo	22	6	10	6	22	16	+6	22
8	Ivangrad	22	7	6	9	29	30	−1	20
9	Gorštak	22	7	6	9	21	38	−17	20
10	Čelik	22	5	7	10	20	21	−1	17
11	Brskovo (R)	22	5	4	13	20	52	−32	14
12	Kom (R)	22	3	6	13	22	33	−11	12

(C) Champions; (P) Promoted to 1972–73 Yugoslav Second League; (R) Relegated

== Higher leagues ==
On season 1971–72, six Montenegrin teams played in higher leagues of SFR Yugoslavia. Sutjeska was a member of 1971–72 Yugoslav First League. Five other teams (Budućnost, Lovćen, OFK Titograd, Bokelj and Iskra) participated in 1971–72 Yugoslav Second League.

== See also ==
- Montenegrin Republic League
- Montenegrin Republic Cup (1947–2006)
- Montenegrin clubs in Yugoslav football competitions (1946–2006)
- Montenegrin Football Championship (1922–1940)
