= Montenegrin Republic League =

- Founded: 1946; 80 years ago
- Folded: 2006
- Country: SR Montenegro, SFR Yugoslavia
- Confederation: UEFA
- Level on pyramid: 3
- Promotion to: Yugoslav Second League
- Domestic cup: Montenegrin Republic Cup Yugoslav Cup
- Last champions: Berane (2005–06)
- Most championships: OFK Titograd (12 titles)

Montenegrin Republic League (Serbo-Croatian: Црногорска републичка лига, romanized: Crnogorska republička liga) was the third tier football league of SFR Yugoslavia. The top clubs were promoted to Yugoslav Second League.

== Overview ==
Founded in spring 1946, Montenegrin Republic League was the oldest football competition in Montenegro after WWII. It existed 60 years, and most of the time it was the third tier of competition (after First League and Second League). In inaugural season (1946) in Montenegrin Republic League played only four clubs – FK Budućnost, FK Lovćen, FK Sutjeska and FK Arsenal.
During its existence, Montenegrin Republic League was organised by Football Association of Montenegro.
Number of participants was different – from four (1946) to 18 during the nineties.
Except that, another competition on republic level, which existed from 1946 to 2006 was Montenegrin Republic Cup.

=== Levels on pyramid ===
While existed, Montenegrin Republic League was not always been third level of competition. It started as a Montenegrin qualifiers for inaugural season of Yugoslav First League. During three seasons (1946–47, 1952 and 1953) it was the second-tier competition in SFR Yugoslavia football system, and during the five years the competition have role of fourth level on pyramid.

| Period | Tier | Period | Tier | Period | Tier |
|---|---|---|---|---|---|
| 1946 | I | 1950 | IV | 1953-1988 | III |
| 1946-1947 | II | 1951 | III | 1988-1992 | IV |
| 1947-1949 | III | 1952-1953 | II | 1992-2006 | III |

== Winners and seasons ==
=== Champions ===
During the six decades, 18 different clubs won the champions title in Montenegrin Republic League.
Most titles won OFK Titograd (12), FK Lovćen (9) and FK Bokelj (8). Except them, eight other teams won more than one champions' title.
Below is a list of champions of Montenegrin Republic League, by number of titles.

| Club | City | Champions | Runners-up | Winning years |
|---|---|---|---|---|
| Titograd | Podgorica | 12 | 6 | 1958/59, 1960/61, 1961/62, 1963/64, 1966/67, 1967/68, 1974/75, 1978/79, 1983/84, 1986/87, 1990/91, 1998/99 |
| Lovćen | Cetinje | 9 | 7 | 1959/60, 1962/63, 1964/65, 1973/74, 1979/80, 1981/82, 1984/85, 1989/90, 1992/93 |
| Bokelj | Kotor | 8 | 3 | 1947/48, 1950, 1953/54, 1955/56, 1956/57, 1970/71, 1985/86, 1987/88 |
| Iskra | Danilovgrad | 4 | 4 | 1969/70, 1972/73, 1993/94, 1999/00 |
| Sutjeska | Nikšić | 4 | 3 | 1946/47, 1948/49, 1954/55, 1976/77 |
| Berane | Berane | 4 | - | 1951, 1982/83, 1996/97, 2005/06 |
| Jedinstvo | Bijelo Polje | 3 | 5 | 1971/72, 1975/76, 1977/78 |
| Mornar | Bar | 3 | 1 | 1988/89, 1994/95, 2000/01 |
| Budućnost | Podgorica | 3 | - | 1946, 1952, 1953 |
| Rudar | Pljevlja | 2 | 5 | 1957/58, 1965/66 |
| Kom | Podgorica | 2 | 1 | 1991/92, 2001/02 |
| Zeta | Golubovci | 1 | 4 | 1997/98 |
| Zora | Spuž | 1 | 2 | 2004/05 |
| Igalo | Igalo | 1 | 2 | 1995/96 |
| Dečić | Tuzi | 1 | 1 | 2003/04 |
| Zabjelo | Podgorica | 1 | 1 | 1968/69 |
| Mogren | Budva | 1 | - | 1980/81 |
| Grbalj | Radanovići | 1 | - | 2002/03 |

=== Seasons ===
From 1946 to 2006, there was 61 seasons of Montenegrin Republic League. Below is the list of winners, runners-up and third-placed teams by every single season. In the number of clubs on higher level are counted all Montenegrin teams which played in Yugoslav First League, Yugoslav Second League or Yugoslav Third League at the time.

Key to list of winners
| ‡ | Winning team won The Double^{a} |

| Season | First place | Second place | Third place | Higher^{b} |
|---|---|---|---|---|
| 1946 | FK Budućnost | FK Lovćen | FK Sutjeska | - |
| 1946/47 | FK Sutjeska | FK Bokelj | FK Lovćen | 1 |
| 1947/48 | FK Bokelj | FK Lovćen | FK Rudar | 1 |
| 1948/49 | FK Sutjeska | FK Lovćen | FK Rudar | 1 |
| 1950 | FK Bokelj | FK Arsenal | FK Rudar | 2 |
| 1951 | FK Berane | FK Sutjeska | FK Jedinstvo | 2 |
| 1952 | FK Budućnost | FK Sutjeska | FK Lovćen | - |
| 1953 | FK Budućnost | FK Lovćen | FK Berane | - |
| 1953/54 | FK Bokelj | FK Sutjeska | FK Arsenal | 2 |
| 1954/55 | FK Sutjeska | OFK Titograd | FK Radnički Nikšić | 3 |
| 1955/56 | FK Bokelj | FK Iskra | FK Gorštak | 9 |
| 1956/57 | FK Bokelj | FK Rudar | FK Javorak | 8 |
| 1957/58 | FK Rudar | FK Zora | FK Gorštak | 8 |
| 1958/59 | OFK Titograd | FK Arsenal | FK Rudar | 3 |
| 1959/60 | FK Lovćen | FK Iskra | FK Jedinstvo | 2 |
| 1960/61 | OFK Titograd | FK Jedinstvo | FK Bokelj | 2 |
| 1961/62 | OFK Titograd | FK Bokelj | FK Rudar | 2 |
| 1962/63 | FK Lovćen | FK Jedinstvo | FK Rudar | 2 |
| 1963/64 | OFK Titograd | FK Lovćen | FK Rudar | 2 |
| 1964/65 | FK Lovćen | OFK Titograd | FK Bokelj | 2 |
| 1965/66 | FK Rudar | OFK Titograd | FK Jedinstvo | 3 |
| 1966/67 | OFK Titograd | FK Rudar | FK Jedinstvo | 3 |
| 1967/68 | OFK Titograd | FK Čelik | FK Jedinstvo | 3 |
| 1968/69 | FK Zabjelo | FK Rudar | FK Arsenal | 6 |
| 1969/70 | FK Iskra | FK Bokelj | FK Mornar | 6 |
| 1970/71 | FK Bokelj | FK Rudar | FK Arsenal | 5 |
| 1971/72 | FK Jedinstvo | FK Rudar | FK Arsenal | 6 |
| 1972/73 | FK Iskra | OFK Petrovac | FK Grafičar | 7 |
| 1973/74 | FK Lovćen | FK Jedinstvo | FK Zeta | 4 |
| 1974/75 | OFK Titograd | FK Zeta | FK Grafičar | 4 |
| 1975/76 | FK Jedinstvo | FK Zeta | FK Mogren | 4 |
| 1976/77 | FK Sutjeska | OFK Titograd | OFK Petrovac | 3 |
| 1977/78 | FK Jedinstvo | OFK Petrovac | OFK Titograd | 3 |
| 1978/79 | OFK Titograd | FK Iskra | FK Lovćen | 3 |
| 1979/80 | FK Lovćen | FK Tekstilac | FK Rudar | 3 |
| 1980/81 | FK Mogren | FK Titeks | FK Čelik | 4 |
| 1981/82 | FK Lovćen | FK Čelik | FK Zeta | 4 |
| 1982/83 | FK Berane | FK Zeta | FK Rudar | |
| 1983/84 | OFK Titograd | FK Zeta | FK Bokelj | |
| 1984/85 | FK Lovćen | FK Čelik | FK Bokelj | |
| 1985/86 | FK Bokelj | OFK Igalo | FK Zeta | |
| 1986/87 | OFK Titograd | OFK Igalo | FK Jedinstvo | |
| 1987/88 | FK Bokelj | FK Jedinstvo | FK Lovćen | |
| 1988/89 | FK Mornar | FK Luka Bar | FK Dečić | |
| 1989/90 | FK Lovćen | FK Dečić | FK Kom | |
| 1990/91 | OFK Titograd | FK Ribnica | FK Kom | |
| 1991/92 | FK Kom | FK Iskra | FK Čelik | |
| 1992/93 | FK Lovćen | FK Kom | FK Luka Bar | |
| 1993/94 | FK Iskra | FK Mornar | OFK Titograd | |
| 1994/95 | FK Mornar | OFK Titograd | FK Kom | |
| 1995/96 | OFK Igalo | FK Čelik | OFK Titograd | |
| 1996/97 | FK Berane | FK Ibar | FK Lovćen | |
| 1997/98 | FK Zeta | FK Lovćen | FK Zabjelo | |
| 1998/99 | OFK Titograd | FK Jedinstvo | OFK Grbalj | |
| 1999/00 | FK Iskra | FK Zabjelo | FK Crvena Stijena | |
| 2000/01 | FK Mornar | OFK Petrovac | FK Ribnica | |
| 2001/02 | FK Kom | FK Jezero | OFK Grbalj | |
| 2002/03 | OFK Grbalj | FK Zora | FK Crvena Stijena | |
| 2003/04 | FK Dečić | FK Lovćen | FK Crvena Stijena | |
| 2004/05 | FK Zora | FK Gusinje | FK Iskra | |
| 2005/06 | FK Berane | OFK Titograd | FK Ibar | |

^a Double = winner of Montenegrin Republic League and Montenegrin Republic Cup during the same season
^b Number of Montenegrin clubs which played on higher level (Yugoslav First League, Yugoslav Second League, Yugoslav Third League)

== Records and statistics ==
=== All-time records ===
- Biggest league victory/defeat: 17–1, Kom vs. Županica, season 2001/02; 15–0, Titograd – Iskra, season 1998/99
- Biggest number of scored goals on single season: 118, Titograd, season 1998/99; 106, Mornar, season 2000/01; 106, Kom, season 2001/02
- Biggest number of conceded goals on single season: 157, Polimlje, season 2000/01; 123, Županica, season 2001/02; 118, Tekstilac, season 1994/95
- Most wins on single season: 28, Mornar, season 2000/01
- Season without any win: Arsenal, season 1966/67; Tekstilac, season 1965/66
- Lowest number of defeats on single season: 1, Mornar, season 2000/01; 1, Titograd, season 1986/87; 1, Titograd, season 1978/79; 1, Titograd, season 1974/75; Titograd, season 1966/67; Rudar, season 1966/67; 1, Lovćen, season 1964/65; 1, Titograd, season 1963/64
- Biggest number of defeats on single season: 27, Polimlje, season 2000/01
- Most draws on single season: 15, Arsenal, season 1989/90
- Biggest number of minutes without conceded goal: 1197, Titograd (goalkeeper: V. Raičević), season 1998/99
- Biggest attendance: 10,000, Berane – Zeta, season 1982/83

Note: Records are counted only for seasons with 10 or more participants

== Relegation and promotion ==
=== Higher tier ===
During the most time, higher level of competition was Yugoslav Second League or Second League of FR Yugoslavia. Exceptions are three seasons when participants of Montenegrin Republic League gained promotion in Yugoslav First League or in the qualifiers for the top-flight, and five seasons when members of Republic League went to Yugoslav Third League.

=== Lower tier ===
Since 1968, Montenegrin regional league system was founded as official competition of fourth-tier. League was structured through three groups – Central (Srednja regija), South (Južna regija) and North (Sjeverna regija). Winners of each group gained promotion to Montenegrin Republic League. From the other side, since 1968, three worst-placed members of Montenegrin Republic League were relegated to regional system, while the group depended from their geographical position.
Same structure is kept in the competition of Montenegrin Third League since 2006.

== See also ==
- Montenegrin clubs in Yugoslav football competitions (1946–2006)
- Montenegrin Republic Cup (1947–2006)
- Montenegrin Football Championship (1922–1940)
- Montenegrin First League
- Montenegrin First League playoffs
- Montenegrin Cup
- Montenegrin clubs in European football competitions
- Montenegrin Derby
- Montenegrin Second League
- Montenegrin Third League
- Football in Montenegro
