= 1974–75 Montenegrin Republic League =

Association football league in Yugoslavia

Montenegrin Republic League
- Season: 1974–75
- Dates: August 1974 - May 1975
- Champions: Titograd
- Relegated: Ivangrad; Ibar; Mladost Lješkopolje
- Matches: 240
- Goals: 744 (3.1 per match)

The 1974–75 Montenegrin Republic League was the 30th season of Montenegrin Republic League. The season started in August 1974 and finished in May 1975.

== Season ==
Locations of the 1974-75 Montenegrin Republic League teams

Just like during the previous year, in Montenegrin Republic League played 16 teams. Among the teams which didn't play on previous season were OFK Titograd (relegated from Yugoslav Second League) and three best teams from Regional leagues - Partizan Momišići, Arsenal and Ivangrad.
After 30 weeks, the title won Titograd, with seven points more than second-placed Zeta.

=== Table ===
Pos	Team	Pld	W	D	L	GF	GA	GD	Pts
1	Titograd (C, P)	30	20	9	1	74	18	+56	49
2	Zeta	30	19	4	7	55	23	+32	42
3	Grafičar	30	11	11	8	34	27	+7	33
4	Rudar	30	12	8	10	49	32	+17	32
5	Jedinstvo	30	12	8	10	33	29	+4	32
6	Iskra	30	12	7	11	56	41	+15	31
7	Čelik	30	13	5	12	55	52	+3	31
8	Partizan Momišići	30	12	6	12	62	50	+12	30
9	Arsenal	30	9	11	10	36	39	−3	29
10	Gorštak	30	13	3	14	45	50	−5	29
11	Zabjelo	30	12	4	14	50	51	−1	28
12	Tekstilac	30	12	4	14	49	54	−5	28
13	Petrovac	30	9	10	11	45	52	−7	28
14	Ivangrad (R)	30	10	5	15	43	48	−5	25
15	Ibar (R)	30	9	4	17	36	69	−33	22
16	Mladost Lješkopolje (R)	30	3	3	24	22	94	−72	9

(C) Champions; (P) Promoted; (R) Relegated

== Higher leagues ==
On season 1974–75, four Montenegrin teams played in higher leagues of SFR Yugoslavia. All of them (Sutjeska, Budućnost, Lovćen and Bokelj) participated in 1974–75 Yugoslav Second League.

== See also ==
- Montenegrin Republic League
- Montenegrin Republic Cup (1947–2006)
- Montenegrin clubs in Yugoslav football competitions (1946–2006)
- Montenegrin Football Championship (1922–1940)
