= 1961–62 Montenegrin Republic League =

Montenegrin Republic League
- Season: 1961–62
- Dates: August 1961 – May 1962
- Champions: OFK Titograd
- Matches: 71
- Goals: 301 (4.24 per match)

The 1961–62 Montenegrin Republic League was 17th season of Montenegrin Republic League. For the first time after the season 1954–55 competition was unified, without final tournaments and zones as qualifying phase. Season started in August 1961 and finished in May 1962.

== Season ==
Locations of the 1961–62 Montenegrin Republic League teams

Before the start of season, Football Association of Montenegro make the decision to create an unified competition with nine teams – three representatives of central Montenegro (OFK Titograd, Čelik and Gorštak), three from northern Montenegro (Rudar, Jedinstvo and Brskovo) and three from southern Montenegro (Lovćen, Bokelj and Arsenal).
During the sixteen weeks long season, five teams battled for first place. At the end, OFK Titograd won the title and participated in the qualifiers for Yugoslav Second League.

=== Table ===
Pos	Team	Pld	W	D	L	GF	GA	GD	Pts
1	Titograd (C, Q)	16	11	2	3	46	19	+27	24
2	Bokelj	16	10	3	3	55	29	+26	23
3	Rudar	16	9	3	4	39	25	+14	21
4	Lovćen	16	8	4	4	25	18	+7	20
5	Jedinstvo	16	8	4	4	25	18	+7	20
6	Čelik	15	4	3	8	25	40	−15	11
7	Arsenal	16	3	4	9	32	29	+3	10
8	Gorštak	15	3	2	10	23	43	−20	8
9	Brskovo	16	1	3	12	15	60	−45	5

(C) Champions; (Q) Place in qualifiers for 1962–63 Yugoslav Second League – East

=== Qualifiers for Yugoslav Second League ===
OFK Titograd played in the qualifiers for 1962–63 Second League – East. As a last-placed team in the group, they didn't succeed to gain a new promotion to second-tier.

Team 1	Team 2	Home	Away
OFK Titograd	Budućnost Peć	0:2	0:3
OFK Titograd	Borac Čačak	3:1	0:6
Radnički Kragujevac	OFK Titograd	3:0	3:0

== Higher leagues ==
On season 1961–62, two Montenegrin teams played in higher leagues of SFR Yugoslavia. Both of them (Budućnost and Sutjeska) participated in 1961–62 Yugoslav Second League.

== See also ==
- Montenegrin Republic League
- Montenegrin Republic Cup (1947–2006)
- Montenegrin clubs in Yugoslav football competitions (1946–2006)
- Montenegrin Football Championship (1922–1940)
