= 1950 Montenegrin Republic League =

Montenegrin Republic League
- Season: 1950
- Dates: March – October 1950
- Champions: Bokelj
- Matches: 56
- Goals: 183 (3.27 per match)

The 1950 Montenegrin Republic League was fifth season of Montenegrin Republic League. Following changes of competition calendar from Football Association of Yugoslavia, the season began in March 1950 and ended in October same year.

== Season ==
Locations of the 1950 Montenegrin Republic League teams

On season 1950, in Republic League participated eight teams. Five clubs gained membership from previous season (Lovćen, Breznik Pljevlja, Bokelj, Iskra and Radnički Ivangrad), while three other teams needed to play qualifiers.

=== Qualifiers ===
In the qualifiers participated 11 teams - Arsenal (Tivat), Mornar (Bar), Jedinstvo (Herceg Novi), Primorac (Bijela), Mogren (Budva), Grafičar (Cetinje), Crvena Zastava (Rogami), Dečić (Tuzi), Prvi Maj (Nikšić), Gorštak (Kolašin) and Bratstvo (Bijelo Polje).
After the phase one, placement in the final of qualifiers gained six teams. They played qualifying Final tournament at Stadion pod Goricom and three best-placed teams gained promotion to 1950 Montenegrin Republic League. Below is the table of Final tournament.

Pos	Team	Pld	W	D	L	GF	GA	GD	Pts
1	Arsenal (Q)	5	4	0	1	14	7	+7	8
2	Mornar (Q)	5	4	0	1	10	8	+2	8
3	Bratstvo Bijelo Polje (Q)	5	2	0	3	13	9	+4	4
4	Jedinstvo	5	2	0	3	8	9	−1	4
5	Grafičar	5	2	0	3	6	8	−2	4
6	Crvena Zastava	5	1	0	4	3	13	−10	2

(Q) Qualified for 1950 Montenegrin Republic League

=== Championship ===
During the fifth edition of Montenegrin Republic League, Bokelj and Arsenal struggled for the title until the last week of championship. At the end, Bokelj won the season, with only single point more than team from Tivat. With that success, Bokelj gained a new chance to play in qualifiers for Yugoslav Second League.

==== Table ====
Pos	Team	Pld	W	D	L	GF	GA	GD	Pts
1	Bokelj (C, Q)	14	10	1	3	32	11	+21	21
2	Arsenal	14	9	2	3	30	13	+17	20
3	Breznik	14	8	1	5	26	19	+7	17
4	Radnički Ivangrad	14	5	4	5	29	20	+9	14
5	Iskra	14	3	6	5	22	24	−2	12
6	Mornar	14	5	2	7	19	30	−11	12
7	Lovćen	14	5	1	8	19	28	−9	11
8	Bratstvo Bijelo Polje	14	1	1	12	6	38	−32	3

(C) Champions; (Q) Place in qualifiers for 1951 Yugoslav Second League

=== Qualifiers for Yugoslav Second League ===
Bokelj played in qualifiers for Yugoslav Second League. Team from Kotor played against Second League side Sutjeska. After two games, Bokelj gained their first-ever promotion to second-tier competition.

Round	Team 1	Team 2	Home	Away
First leg	Sutjeska Nikšić	Bokelj Kotor	2:0	0:3

== Higher leagues ==
On season 1950, two Montenegrin teams played in higher leagues of SFR Yugoslavia. Budućnost was a participant of 1950 Yugoslav First League, while Sutjeska) played in 1950 Yugoslav Third League.

== See also ==
- Montenegrin Republic League
- Montenegrin Republic Cup (1947–2006)
- Montenegrin clubs in Yugoslav football competitions (1946–2006)
- Montenegrin Football Championship (1922–1940)
