= 1962–63 Montenegrin Republic League =

Montenegrin Republic League
- Season: 1962–63
- Dates: August 1962 - May 1963
- Champions: Lovćen
- Matches played: 90
- Goals scored: 314 (3.49 per match)

The 1962–63 Montenegrin Republic League was 18th season of Montenegrin Republic League. Season started in August 1962 and finished in May 1963.

== Season ==
Locations of the 1962-63 Montenegrin Republic League teams

Before the start of 18th edition of the League, number of participants was expanded to 10 (on season 1961–62 played nine teams. Except the teams from previous year, a new member of the competition was Ivangrad. Just before the start of season, Čelik withdrawn by their own decision, so their place was given to Iskra.
At the end of 18 weeks long competition, Lovćen and Jedinstvo were equalised on the top of the table. But, because of better goal difference, Lovćen won the title and participated in the qualifiers for Yugoslav Second League.
Last-placed Arsenal was relegated.

=== Table ===
Pos	Team	Pld	W	D	L	GF	GA	GD	Pts
1	Lovćen (C, Q)	18	10	5	3	36	15	+21	25
2	Jedinstvo	18	10	5	3	36	21	+15	25
3	Rudar	18	9	3	6	35	23	+12	21
4	Bokelj	18	8	3	7	44	27	+17	19
5	Iskra	18	8	2	8	30	34	−4	18
6	Ivangrad	18	8	1	9	37	43	−6	17
7	Brskovo	18	6	4	8	25	39	−14	16
8	Gorštak	18	7	1	10	28	40	−12	15
9	Titograd	18	5	3	10	21	36	−15	13
10	Arsenal (R)	18	4	3	11	22	36	−14	11

(C) Champions; (Q) Place in qualifiers for 1963–64 Yugoslav Second League - East; (R) Relegated

=== Qualifiers for Yugoslav Second League ===
Lovćen played in the qualifiers for 1963–64 Second League - East. They were defeated by champion of Republic League of SR Macedonia - Pobeda, so didn't get promotion to higher level.

Team 1	Team 2	Home	Away
Lovćen Cetinje	Pobeda Prilep	1:1	0:1

== Higher leagues ==
On season 1962–63, two Montenegrin teams played in higher leagues of SFR Yugoslavia. Budućnost participated in 1962–63 Yugoslav First League, while Sutjeska) played in 1962–63 Yugoslav Second League.

== See also ==
- Montenegrin Republic League
- Montenegrin Republic Cup (1947–2006)
- Montenegrin clubs in Yugoslav football competitions (1946–2006)
- Montenegrin Football Championship (1922–1940)
