= 1959–60 Montenegrin Republic League =

Montenegrin Republic League
- Season: 1959–60
- Dates: April – May 1960
- Champions: Lovćen
- Matches: 6
- Goals: 19 (3.17 per match)

The 1959–60 Montenegrin Republic League was 15th season of Montenegrin Republic League. Similar to previous season League was organised as tournament, during the April and May 1960.

== Season ==
=== Qualifiers ===
In the qualifiers, 16 teams were placed into three regional groups. Winners of the groups (Zmaj, FK Jedinstvo and Lovćen) qualified for Montenegrin Republic League. Below are the final tables of each qualifying group.

Center
Pos	Team	Pts
1	Zmaj	16
2	Zora	10
3	Kom	6
4	Čelik	5
5	Dečić	3
6	Mladost Titograd	0

North
Pos	Team	Pts
1	Jedinstvo Bijelo Polje	12
2	Rudar	6
3	Radnički Ivangrad	6
4	Ibar	0

South
Pos	Team	Pts
1	Lovćen	20
2	Bokelj	16
3	Arsenal	12
4	Mogren	9
5	Primorje Herceg Novi	5
6	Bar	0

=== Championship ===
Locations of the 1959–60 Montenegrin Republic League teams

At the finals, every team played four games and the winner went to qualifiers for Yugoslav Second League.
Title holder was Lovćen, who finished season with three wins and one draw.

==== Table ====
Pos	Team	Pld	W	D	L	GF	GA	GD	Pts
1	Lovćen (C, Q)	4	3	1	0	10	1	+9	7
2	Zmaj	4	2	0	2	6	8	−2	4
3	Jedinstvo	4	0	0	4	3	10	−7	0

(C) Champions; (Q) Place in qualifiers for 1960–61 Yugoslav Second League

=== Qualifiers for Yugoslav Second League ===
In the qualifiers for 1960–61 Second League – East, Lovćen played in the finals but didn't succeed to gain promotion.

Phase	Team 1	Team 2	Home	Away
Semifinals	Pelister Bitola	Lovćen Cetinje	3:3	0:2
Finals	Rudar Kosovska Mitrovica	Lovćen Cetinje	6:0	1:2

== Higher leagues ==
On season 1959–60, two Montenegrin teams played in higher leagues of SFR Yugoslavia. Budućnost was a member of 1959–60 Yugoslav First League and Sutjeska played in 1959–60 Yugoslav Second League.

== See also ==
- Montenegrin Republic League
- Montenegrin Republic Cup (1947–2006)
- Montenegrin clubs in Yugoslav football competitions (1946–2006)
- Montenegrin Football Championship (1922–1940)
