= 1972–73 Montenegrin Republic League =

Montenegrin Republic League
- Season: 1972–73
- Dates: August 1972 - June 1973
- Champions: Iskra
- Relegated: Mogren; Arsenal; Dečić
- Matches: 179
- Goals: 498 (2.78 per match)

The 1972–73 Montenegrin Republic League was the 28th season of Montenegrin Republic League. The season started in August 1972 and finished in June 1973.

== Season ==
Locations of the 1972-73 Montenegrin Republic League teams

For the first time in competition history, on season 1972–73, in Montenegrin Republic League participated 14 teams. Among the teams which didn't play on previous season was Iskra (relegated from Yugoslav Second League) and five best teams from Regional leagues - Mogren, Petrovac, Dečić, Zeta and Jezero.
After 26 weeks, the title won Iskra. Second-placed was Petrovac with one point less than title winner. But, due to changes in the system of Yugoslav Second League, which predicted two instead four groups from season 1973–74, no one was promoted to higher rank.
Two lowest ranked teams - Mogren, Arsenal and Dečić were relegated to Regional leagues (fourth level).

=== Table ===
Pos	Team	Pld	W	D	L	GF	GA	GD	Pts
1	Iskra (C)	26	15	4	7	41	25	+16	34
2	Petrovac	26	15	3	8	39	25	+14	33
3	Grafičar	26	12	7	7	38	25	+13	31
4	Ibar	26	12	6	8	33	20	+13	30
5	Jezero	25	12	5	8	42	33	+9	29
6	Mornar	25	13	3	9	34	32	+2	29
7	Zeta	26	10	7	9	48	40	+8	27
8	Čelik	25	10	5	10	40	39	+1	25
9	Zabjelo	25	8	6	11	21	38	−17	22
10	Ivangrad	26	8	5	13	39	44	−5	21
11	Gorštak	25	9	2	14	31	37	−6	20
12	Mogren (R)	26	6	8	12	28	41	−13	20
13	Arsenal (R)	26	6	7	13	21	42	−21	19
14	Dečić (R)	25	8	2	15	22	45	−23	18

(C) Champions; (R) Relegated

== Higher leagues ==
On season 1972–73, seven Montenegrin teams played in higher leagues of SFR Yugoslavia. Sutjeska was a member of 1972–73 Yugoslav First League. Five other teams (Budućnost, Lovćen, OFK Titograd, Bokelj, Rudar and Jedinstvo) participated in 1972–73 Yugoslav Second League.

== See also ==
- Montenegrin Republic League
- Montenegrin Republic Cup (1947–2006)
- Montenegrin clubs in Yugoslav football competitions (1946–2006)
- Montenegrin Football Championship (1922–1940)
