= 1963–64 Montenegrin Republic League =

Montenegrin Republic League
- Season: 1963–64
- Dates: August 1963 - May 1964
- Champions: OFK Titograd
- Matches: 89
- Goals: 316 (3.55 per match)

The 1963–64 Montenegrin Republic League was 19th season of Montenegrin Republic League. Season started in August 1963 and finished in May 1964.

== Season ==
Locations of the 1963-64 Montenegrin Republic League teams

Except the teams from previous year, a new member of the competition was Zeta. They replaced a last placed team from previous season (Arsenal). At the end of 18 weeks long competition, OFK Titograd won the title, with only single point more than Lovćen. With that result, Titograd participated in the qualifiers for Yugoslav Second League. Last-placed Zeta was relegated.

=== Table ===
Pos	Team	Pld	W	D	L	GF	GA	GD	Pts
1	Titograd (C, Q)	18	12	5	1	42	11	+31	29
2	Lovćen	18	12	4	2	43	12	+31	28
3	Rudar	17	10	2	5	35	26	+9	22
4	Bokelj	18	9	3	6	42	23	+19	21
5	Jedinstvo	17	7	4	6	36	28	+8	18
6	Iskra	18	4	5	9	26	41	−15	13
7	Gorštak	18	5	2	11	26	35	−9	12
8	Ivangrad	18	4	4	10	20	45	−25	12
9	Brskovo	18	4	4	10	22	53	−31	12
10	Zeta (R)	18	4	3	11	24	42	−18	11

(C) Champions; (Q) Place in qualifiers for 1964–65 Yugoslav Second League - East; (R) Relegated

=== Qualifiers for Yugoslav Second League ===
Titograd played in the qualifiers for 1964-65 Second League - East. They were defeated by champion of Republic League of SR Macedonia - Bregalnica Štip, so didn't get promotion to higher level.

Team 1	Team 2	Home	Away
Bregalnica Štip	Titograd	1:0	3:3

== Higher leagues ==
On season 1963–64, two Montenegrin teams played in higher leagues of SFR Yugoslavia. Both of them (Budućnost and Sutjeska) participated in 1963–64 Yugoslav Second League.

== See also ==
- Montenegrin Republic League
- Montenegrin Republic Cup (1947–2006)
- Montenegrin clubs in Yugoslav football competitions (1946–2006)
- Montenegrin Football Championship (1922–1940)
