= 1957–58 Montenegrin Republic League =

Montenegrin Republic League
- Season: 1957–58
- Dates: September 1957 – November 1958
- Champions: Rudar
- Matches: 26
- Goals: 65 (2.5 per match)

The 1957–58 Montenegrin Republic League was 13th season of Montenegrin Republic League. Season started in September 1957 and interrupted in November same year.

== Season ==
Locations of the 1957–58 Montenegrin Republic League teams

In Montenegrin Republic League for season 1957–58 played seven teams, but most of the games weren't played, due to fact that Bar and Igalo withdrew after only three weeks.
For the first time in their history, winner of competition was Rudar. But, following the decision of Football Association of Yugoslavia to reorganise structure of Yugoslav Second League, winner of Montenegrin Republic League finished without promotion or qualifiers for higher rank.

=== Table ===
After an incomplete season, Rudar finished at first position with one point more than second-placed Zora.

Pos	Team	Pld	W	D	L	GF	GA	GD	Pts
1	Rudar (C)	4	3	1	0	15	6	+9	7
2	Zora	4	3	0	1	14	9	+5	6
3	Gorštak	4	2	1	1	8	8	0	5
4	Bar	3	3	0	0	12	0	+12	0 (Note: 6 points deducted) (Note: Bar and Igalo withdrew after the Week 3)
5	Igalo	3	0	0	3	4	10	−6	0
6	Radnički Ivangrad	4	0	0	4	6	15	−9	0

(C) Champions

== Higher leagues ==
On season 1957–58, eight Montenegrin teams played in higher leagues of SFR Yugoslavia. Budućnost was a member of 1957–58 Yugoslav First League, while Nikšić, Lovćen, Arsenal, Mladost Titograd, Bokelj, Jedinstvo Bijelo Polje and Jedinstvo Herceg Novi played in 1957–58 Yugoslav Second League.

== See also ==
- Montenegrin Republic League
- Montenegrin Republic Cup (1947–2006)
- Montenegrin clubs in Yugoslav football competitions (1946–2006)
- Montenegrin Football Championship (1922–1940)
