= 1966–67 Montenegrin Republic League =

Montenegrin Republic League
- Season: 1966–67
- Dates: August 1966 – May 1967
- Champions: Titograd
- Relegated: Arsenal; Brskovo
- Matches: 121
- Goals: 466 (3.85 per match)

The 1966–67 Montenegrin Republic League was 22nd season of Montenegrin Republic League. Season started in August 1966 and finished in May 1967.

== Season ==
Locations of the 1966–67 Montenegrin Republic League teams

After the season 1965–66, Football Association of Montenegro decided to expand a number of participants from 10 to 12. So, the new members of Montenegrin Republic League became Mornar, Spuž and Čelik.
At the end of 22 weeks long competition, OFK Titograd won the title. Team from the capital were equalised with the second-placed Rudar, but they scored more goals during the season. With that result, OFK Titograd participated in the qualifiers for Yugoslav Second League.
After the autumn stage, Arsenal withdrawn from competition due to technical difficulties. Except them, from league was relegated 11th-placed Brskovo.

=== Table ===
Pos	Team	Pld	W	D	L	GF	GA	GD	Pts
1	Titograd (C, Q)	21	16	4	1	67	14	+53	36
2	Rudar	21	16	4	1	58	14	+44	36
3	Jedinstvo	21	11	6	4	44	25	+19	28
4	Čelik	21	9	6	6	48	22	+26	24
5	Mornar	21	10	3	8	42	35	+7	23
6	Bokelj	21	11	1	9	48	46	+2	23
7	Iskra	21	8	3	10	46	52	−6	19
8	Ivangrad	21	7	2	12	32	47	−15	16
9	Dečić	21	4	7	10	29	62	−33	15
10	Spuž	21	5	2	14	28	50	−22	12
11	Brskovo (R)	21	1	7	13	17	52	−35	9
12	Arsenal (R)	11	0	1	10	7	45	−38	1

(C) Champions; (Q) Place in qualifiers for 1967–68 Yugoslav Second League – East; (R) Relegated

=== Qualifiers for Yugoslav Second League ===
Titograd played in the qualifiers for 1967–68 Second League – East. Their opponent was a winner of Republic League of SR Macedonia – Bregalnica Štip. Montenegrin team was eliminated.

Team 1	Team 2	Home	Away
OFK Titograd	Bregalnica Štip	1:0	1:3

== Higher leagues ==
On season 1966–67, three Montenegrin teams played in higher leagues of SFR Yugoslavia. Sutjeska participated in 1966–67 Yugoslav First League, while Budućnost and Lovćen played in 1966–67 Yugoslav Second League.

== See also ==
- Montenegrin Republic League
- Montenegrin Republic Cup (1947–2006)
- Montenegrin clubs in Yugoslav football competitions (1946–2006)
- Montenegrin Football Championship (1922–1940)
