= 1964–65 Montenegrin Republic League =

Montenegrin Republic League
- Season: 1964–65
- Dates: August 1964 - May 1965
- Champions: OFK Titograd
- Matches: 90
- Goals: 316 (3.51 per match)

The 1964–65 Montenegrin Republic League was 20th season of Montenegrin Republic League. Season started in August 1964 and finished in May 1965.

== Season ==
Locations of the 1964-65 Montenegrin Republic League teams

Except the teams from previous year, a new member of the competition was Arsenal. They replaced a last placed team from previous season (Zeta).
At the end of 18 weeks long competition, Lovćen won the title, with 31 from 36 possible points. With that result, Lovćen participated in the qualifiers for Yugoslav Second League.
Last-placed Gorštak was relegated.

=== Table ===
Pos	Team	Pld	W	D	L	GF	GA	GD	Pts
1	Lovćen (C, Q)	18	14	3	1	42	9	+33	31
2	Titograd	18	10	4	4	40	20	+20	24
3	Bokelj	18	8	4	6	32	26	+6	20
4	Iskra	18	8	3	7	34	26	+8	19
5	Rudar	18	9	1	8	35	30	+5	17 (Note: 2 points deducted?)
6	Ivangrad	18	7	3	8	27	22	+5	17
7	Jedinstvo	18	7	2	9	29	32	−3	16
8	Arsenal	18	5	4	9	26	45	−19	14
9	Brskovo	18	5	2	11	25	43	−18	12
10	Gorštak (R)	18	3	2	13	26	63	−37	8

(C) Champions; (Q) Place in qualifiers for 1965–66 Yugoslav Second League - East; (R) Relegated

=== Qualifiers for Yugoslav Second League ===
Lovćen played in the qualifiers for 1965-66 Second League - East. They won a qualifiers against champion of Republic League of SR Macedonia - Teteks Tetovo, and get promotion to higher level.

Team 1	Team 2	Home	Away
Lovćen Cetinje	Teteks Tetovo	2:0	2:2

== Higher leagues ==
On season 1964–65, two Montenegrin teams played in higher leagues of SFR Yugoslavia. Sutjeska participated in 1964–65 Yugoslav First League, while Budućnost played in 1964–65 Yugoslav Second League.

== See also ==
- Montenegrin Republic League
- Montenegrin Republic Cup (1947–2006)
- Montenegrin clubs in Yugoslav football competitions (1946–2006)
- Montenegrin Football Championship (1922–1940)
