= 1955–56 Montenegrin Republic League =

Montenegrin Republic League
- Season: 1955–56
- Dates: March 1956 – May 1956
- Champions: Bokelj
- Matches played: 24
- Goals scored: 111 (4.63 per match)

The 1955–56 Montenegrin Republic League was 11th season of Montenegrin Republic League. Season began in March 1956 and ended in May same year.

== Season ==
Locations of the 1955-56 Montenegrin Republic League teams

As nine Montenegrin teams played in 1955-56 edition of Yugoslav First League and Yugoslav Second League, third tier of competition became Competition of Titograd Football Association (Titogradski podsavez).
Divided in two groups (Southern and Northern), competition had eight participants. Among them, for the first and only time was one team from non-Montenegrin territory, GOŠK Dubrovnik (SR Croatia). Because of that, results of GOŠK Dubrovnik are not included in the final table or in the all-time scores list of Montenegrin Republic League.

=== Southern group ===
Title winner in Southern group was Bokelj, who was undefeated after six weeks.

| Pos | Team | Pld | W | D | L | GF | GA | GD | Pts |
|---|---|---|---|---|---|---|---|---|---|
| 1 | Bokelj | 6 | 5 | 1 | 0 | 23 | 4 | +19 | 11 |
| 2 | GOŠK Dubrovnik | 6 | 4 | 1 | 1 | 24 | 5 | +19 | 9 |
| 3 | Igalo | 6 | 2 | 0 | 4 | 9 | 22 | −13 | 4 |
| 4 | Mogren | 6 | 0 | 0 | 6 | 1 | 32 | −31 | 0 |

=== Northern group ===
Title winner in Northern group was Iskra, who was undefeated after six weeks.

| Pos | Team | Pld | W | D | L | GF | GA | GD | Pts |
|---|---|---|---|---|---|---|---|---|---|
| 1 | Iskra | 6 | 4 | 2 | 0 | 23 | 7 | +16 | 10 |
| 2 | Gorštak | 6 | 4 | 1 | 1 | 14 | 15 | −1 | 9 |
| 3 | Zora | 6 | 2 | 0 | 4 | 14 | 19 | −5 | 4 |
| 4 | Javorak | 6 | 0 | 1 | 5 | 3 | 23 | −20 | 1 |

=== Final table ===
Winner of the season was Bokelj, who had one point more than Iskra. In final classification is not included score of GOŠK Dubrovnik.

| Pos | Team | Pld | W | D | L | GF | GA | GD | Pts |
|---|---|---|---|---|---|---|---|---|---|
| 1 | Bokelj (C) | 6 | 5 | 1 | 0 | 23 | 4 | +19 | 11 |
| 2 | Iskra | 6 | 4 | 2 | 0 | 23 | 7 | +16 | 10 |
| 3 | Gorštak | 6 | 4 | 1 | 1 | 14 | 15 | −1 | 9 |
| 4 | Zora | 6 | 2 | 0 | 4 | 14 | 19 | −5 | 4 |
| 5 | Igalo | 6 | 2 | 0 | 4 | 9 | 22 | −13 | 4 |
| 6 | Javorak | 6 | 0 | 1 | 5 | 3 | 23 | −20 | 1 |
| 7 | Mogren | 6 | 0 | 0 | 6 | 1 | 32 | −31 | 0 |

(C) Champions

== Higher leagues ==
On season 1955–56, nine Montenegrin teams played in higher leagues of SFR Yugoslavia. Budućnost was a member of 1955–56 Yugoslav First League, while Sutjeska, Lovćen, Arsenal, Radnički Nikšić, Mladost Titograd, Radnički Ivangrad, Jedinstvo Bijelo Polje and Jedinstvo Herceg Novi played in 1955–56 Yugoslav Second League.

== See also ==
- Montenegrin Republic League
- Montenegrin Republic Cup (1947–2006)
- Montenegrin clubs in Yugoslav football competitions (1946–2006)
- Montenegrin Football Championship (1922–1940)
