= 1970–71 Montenegrin Republic League =

Football league season

Montenegrin Republic League
- Season: 1970–71
- Dates: August 1970 - May 1971
- Champions: Bokelj
- Relegated: Dečić; Spuž
- Matches: 132
- Goals: 425 (3.22 per match)

The 1970–71 Montenegrin Republic League was 26th season of Montenegrin Republic League. Season started in August 1970 and finished in May 1971.

== Season ==
Locations of the 1970-71 Montenegrin Republic League teams

On season 1970–71, in Montenegrin Republic League participated 12 teams. Among the teams which didn't play during the previous season were Zabjelo and Jedinstvo (relegated from Second League) and the two best teams from Regional leagues - Gorštak and Kom.
After 22 weeks, the title won Bokelj, with only one point more than Rudar Pljevlja. With that result, Iskra gained a promotion to Yugoslav Second League. Three lowest ranked teams - Dečić and Spuž were relegated to Regional leagues (fourth level).

=== Table ===
| Pos | Team | Pld | W | D | L | GF | GA | GD | Pts |
|---|---|---|---|---|---|---|---|---|---|
| 1 | Bokelj (C, P) | 22 | 16 | 4 | 2 | 57 | 10 | +47 | 36 |
| 2 | Rudar Pljevlja | 22 | 16 | 3 | 3 | 53 | 13 | +40 | 35 |
| 3 | Arsenal | 22 | 12 | 2 | 8 | 43 | 30 | +13 | 26 |
| 4 | Čelik | 22 | 9 | 4 | 9 | 39 | 29 | +10 | 22 |
| 5 | Kom | 22 | 9 | 4 | 9 | 35 | 50 | −15 | 22 |
| 6 | Mornar | 22 | 10 | 2 | 10 | 28 | 43 | −15 | 22 |
| 7 | Ivangrad | 22 | 10 | 1 | 11 | 28 | 24 | +4 | 21 |
| 8 | Jedinstvo | 22 | 7 | 7 | 8 | 29 | 26 | +3 | 21 |
| 9 | Gorštak | 22 | 8 | 3 | 11 | 25 | 38 | −13 | 19 |
| 10 | Zabjelo | 22 | 8 | 2 | 12 | 34 | 35 | −1 | 18 |
| 11 | Dečić (R) | 22 | 5 | 4 | 13 | 22 | 40 | −18 | 14 |
| 12 | Spuž (R) | 22 | 3 | 2 | 17 | 22 | 54 | −32 | 8 |

(C) Champions; (P) Promoted to 1971–72 Yugoslav Second League - South; (R) Relegated

== Higher leagues ==
On season 1970–71, six Montenegrin teams played in higher leagues of SFR Yugoslavia. All of them (Budućnost, Sutjeska, Lovćen, OFK Titograd and Iskra) participated in 1970–71 Yugoslav Second League.

== See also ==
- Montenegrin Republic League
- Montenegrin Republic Cup (1947–2006)
- Montenegrin clubs in Yugoslav football competitions (1946–2006)
- Montenegrin Football Championship (1922–1940)
