= 1968–69 Montenegrin Republic League =

Montenegrin Republic League
- Season: 1968–69
- Dates: August 1968 – May 1969
- Champions: Tara Zabjelo
- Relegated: Brskovo; Ibar
- Matches: 132
- Goals: 494 (3.74 per match)

The 1968–69 Montenegrin Republic League was 24th season of Montenegrin Republic League. Season started in August 1968 and finished in May 1969.

== Season ==
Locations of the 1968–69 Montenegrin Republic League teams

On season 1968–69, in Montenegrin Republic League participated 12 teams. As three members from previous season were promoted to Yugoslav Second League and no one was relegated, new members of Republic tier were Arsenal, Crvena Stijena and Brskovo.

For the first and only time in their history, Tara Zabjelo won the title of Montenegrin Republic League champion. They finished season with seven points more than second-placed Rudar and third-placed Arsenal. With that result, Tara Zabjelo gained a promotion to Yugoslav Second League.

Two last placed teams – Brskovo and Ibar, were relegated.

=== Table ===
Pos	Team	Pld	W	D	L	GF	GA	GD	Pts
1	Tara Zabjelo (C, P)	22	15	3	4	48	15	+33	33
2	Rudar	22	11	4	7	45	29	+16	26
3	Arsenal	22	11	4	7	56	41	+15	26
4	Bokelj	22	9	6	7	50	34	+16	24
5	Ivangrad	22	10	4	8	47	38	+9	24
6	Iskra	22	11	1	10	45	33	+12	23
7	Spuž	22	9	3	10	42	54	−12	21
8	Dečić	22	9	3	10	32	48	−16	21
9	Mornar	22	9	2	11	35	46	−11	20
10	Crvena Stijena	22	9	2	11	44	54	−10	20
11	Brskovo (R)	22	5	4	13	22	44	−22	14
12	Ibar (R)	22	4	4	14	28	58	−30	12

(C) Champions; (P) Promoted to 1969–70 Yugoslav Second League – South; (R) Relegated

== Higher leagues ==
On season 1968–69, six Montenegrin teams played in higher leagues of SFR Yugoslavia. All of them (Budućnost, Sutjeska, Lovćen, OFK Titograd, Čelik and Jedinstvo) participated in 1968–69 Yugoslav Second League.

== Lower tier ==
On season 1968–69 are introduced Regional leagues as official fourth tier competition. League was structured through three groups – Central (Srednja regija), South (Južna regija) and North (Sjeverna regija). Best teams from Regional leagues gained promotion to Montenegrin Republic League.

== See also ==
- Montenegrin Republic League
- Montenegrin Republic Cup (1947–2006)
- Montenegrin clubs in Yugoslav football competitions (1946–2006)
- Montenegrin Football Championship (1922–1940)
