= 1979–80 Montenegrin Republic League =

Montenegrin Republic League
- Season: 1979–80
- Dates: August 1979 - May 1980
- Champions: Lovćen
- Relegated: Ulcinj; Ibar
- Matches: 182
- Goals: 502 (2.76 per match)

The 1979–80 Montenegrin Republic League was 35th season of Montenegrin Republic League. Season started in August 1979 and finished in May 1980.

== Season ==
Locations of the 1979-80 Montenegrin Republic League teams

In Montenegrin Republic League 1979-80 participated 14 teams. Among the clubs which didn't play on previous season were Jedinstvo (relegated from Yugoslav Second League) and three best teams from lower tier - Metalac, Ibar and Mornar. The title won Lovćen, with seven points more than Tekstilac

=== Table ===
Pos	Team	Pld	W	D	L	GF	GA	GD	Pts
1	Lovćen (C, P)	26	16	7	3	59	22	+37	39
2	Tekstilac	26	12	8	6	42	26	+16	32
3	Rudar	26	11	5	10	38	28	+10	27
4	Zeta	26	8	10	8	36	36	0	26
5	Mogren	26	9	8	9	27	27	0	26
6	Iskra	26	9	7	10	39	40	−1	25
7	Bokelj	26	7	11	8	34	35	−1	25
8	Petrovac	26	9	7	10	41	48	−7	25
9	Čelik	26	8	8	10	41	48	−7	24
10	Jedinstvo	26	9	6	11	28	32	−4	24
11	Mornar	26	8	8	10	35	50	−15	24
12	Metalac	26	7	9	10	25	37	−12	23
13	Ulcinj (R)	26	9	5	12	30	44	−14	23
14	Ibar (R)	26	7	7	12	27	41	−14	21

(C) Champions; (P) Promoted; (R) Relegated

== Higher leagues ==
On season 1979–80, three Montenegrin teams played in higher leagues of SFR Yugoslavia. Budućnost participated in 1979–80 Yugoslav First League, while two other teams (Sutjeska and OFK Titograd) played in 1979–80 Yugoslav Second League.

== See also ==
- Montenegrin Republic League
- Montenegrin Republic Cup (1947–2006)
- Montenegrin clubs in Yugoslav football competitions (1946–2006)
- Montenegrin Football Championship (1922–1940)
