= 1981–82 Montenegrin Republic League =

Montenegrin Republic League
- Season: 1981–82
- Dates: August 1981 - May 1982
- Champions: Lovćen
- Relegated: Petrovac; Tara Cetinje; Jezero
- Matches: 182
- Goals: 434 (2.38 per match)

The 1981–82 Montenegrin Republic League was the 37th season of Montenegrin Republic League, the third league in Montenegrin football. The season started in August 1981 and finished in May 1982.

== Season ==
Locations of the 1980-81 Montenegrin Republic League teams

In Montenegrin Republic League 1981-82 participated 14 teams. Among the clubs which didn't play on previous season were Lovćen (relegated from Yugoslav Second League) and three best teams from lower tier - Zabjelo, Tara Cetinje and Ivangrad.
The title won Lovćen, with three points more than Čelik

=== Table ===
| Pos | Team | Pld | W | D | L | GF | GA | GD | Pts |
|---|---|---|---|---|---|---|---|---|---|
| 1 | Lovćen (C, P) | 26 | 15 | 5 | 6 | 48 | 21 | +27 | 35 |
| 2 | Čelik | 26 | 13 | 6 | 7 | 42 | 26 | +16 | 32 |
| 3 | Zeta | 26 | 12 | 7 | 7 | 33 | 21 | +12 | 31 |
| 4 | Ivangrad | 26 | 14 | 2 | 10 | 45 | 29 | +16 | 30 |
| 5 | Iskra | 26 | 11 | 8 | 7 | 35 | 26 | +9 | 30 |
| 6 | Arsenal | 26 | 11 | 6 | 9 | 30 | 26 | +4 | 28 |
| 7 | Zabjelo | 26 | 9 | 9 | 8 | 50 | 31 | +19 | 27 |
| 8 | Mornar | 26 | 9 | 9 | 8 | 47 | 34 | +13 | 27 |
| 9 | Titeks | 26 | 9 | 9 | 8 | 36 | 36 | 0 | 27 |
| 10 | Rudar | 26 | 10 | 6 | 10 | 47 | 49 | −2 | 26 |
| 11 | Bokelj | 26 | 9 | 5 | 12 | 27 | 25 | +2 | 23 |
| 12 | Petrovac (R) | 26 | 7 | 9 | 10 | 30 | 37 | −7 | 23 |
| 13 | Tara Cetinje (R) | 26 | 8 | 3 | 15 | 36 | 60 | −24 | 19 |
| 14 | Jezero (R) | 26 | 2 | 2 | 22 | 18 | 82 | −64 | 6 |

(C) Champions; (P) Promoted; (R) Relegated

== Higher leagues ==
On season 1981–82, four Montenegrin teams played in higher leagues of SFR Yugoslavia. Budućnost participated in 1981–82 Yugoslav First League, while three other teams (Sutjeska, OFK Titograd and Mogren) played in 1981–82 Yugoslav Second League.

== See also ==
- Montenegrin Republic League
- Montenegrin Republic Cup (1947–2006)
- Montenegrin clubs in Yugoslav football competitions (1946–2006)
- Montenegrin Football Championship (1922–1940)
