= 1956–57 Montenegrin Republic League =

Montenegrin Republic League
- Season: 1956–57
- Dates: May 1957
- Champions: Bokelj
- Matches played: 3
- Goals scored: 5 (1.67 per match)

The 1956–57 Montenegrin Republic League was 12th season of Montenegrin Republic League. Due to fact that majority of Montenegrin teams played in higher ranks, League was organised as tournament.

== Season ==
Locations of the 1956–57 Montenegrin Republic League teams

The championship was organised as tournament of three teams – winners of regional qualifiers in which eight teams participated – Bokelj, Rudar, Gorštak, Javorak, Radnički Ivangrad, Igalo, Poštar and Zora.
Most successful teams from qualifiers were Bokelj, Rudar and Javorak, who participated in Montenegrin Republic League tournament for season 1956–57.

=== Table and results ===
Results of the final tournament: Rudar – Javorak 1-1; Bokelj – Rudar 0-0; Javorak – Bokelj 0-3.
As a first-placed team, Bokelj gained promotion to Yugoslav Second League.

| Pos | Team | Pld | W | D | L | GF | GA | GD | Pts |
|---|---|---|---|---|---|---|---|---|---|
| 1 | Bokelj (C, P) | 2 | 1 | 1 | 0 | 3 | 0 | +3 | 3 |
| 2 | Rudar | 2 | 0 | 2 | 0 | 1 | 1 | 0 | 2 |
| 3 | Javorak | 2 | 0 | 1 | 1 | 1 | 4 | −3 | 1 |

(C) Champions; (P) Promoted to 1957–58 Yugoslav Second League

== Higher leagues ==
On season 1956–57, eight Montenegrin teams played in higher leagues of SFR Yugoslavia. Budućnost was a member of 1956–57 Yugoslav First League, while Nikšić, Lovćen, Arsenal, Mladost Titograd, Iskra, Jedinstvo Bijelo Polje and Jedinstvo Herceg Novi played in 1956–57 Yugoslav Second League.

== See also ==
- Montenegrin Republic League
- Montenegrin Republic Cup (1947–2006)
- Montenegrin clubs in Yugoslav football competitions (1946–2006)
- Montenegrin Football Championship (1922–1940)
