= 1969–70 Montenegrin Republic League =

Montenegrin Republic League
- Season: 1969–70
- Dates: August 1969 - May 1970
- Champions: Iskra
- Relegated: Jezero; Crvena Stijena; Muo
- Matches: 132
- Goals: 493 (3.73 per match)

The 1969–70 Montenegrin Republic League was 25th season of Montenegrin Republic League. Season started in August 1969 and finished in May 1970.

== Season ==
Locations of the 1969-70 Montenegrin Republic League teams

On season 1969–70, in Montenegrin Republic League participated 12 teams. Among the teams which didn't play during the previous season were Čelik (relegated from previous season and best teams from Regional leagues - Jezero and Muo.
After 22 weeks, the title won Iskra, with only one point more than Bokelj. With that result, Iskra gained a promotion to Yugoslav Second League. Three lowest ranked teams - Jezero, Crvena Stijena and Muo were relegated to Regional leagues (fourth level).

=== Table ===
Pos	Team	Pld	W	D	L	GF	GA	GD	Pts
1	Iskra (C, P)	22	16	2	4	57	26	+31	34
2	Bokelj	22	16	1	5	69	28	+41	33
3	Mornar	22	12	4	6	40	24	+16	28
4	Rudar	22	10	5	7	48	30	+18	25
5	Arsenal	22	9	4	9	38	31	+7	22
6	Dečić	22	9	4	9	46	44	+2	22
7	Ivangrad	22	10	2	10	33	47	−14	22
8	Čelik	22	9	3	10	42	32	+10	21
9	Spuž	22	7	7	8	39	41	−2	21
10	Jezero (R)	22	7	4	11	36	50	−14	18
11	Crvena Stijena (R)	22	4	3	15	27	57	−30	11
12	Muo (R)	22	3	1	18	18	69	−51	7

(C) Champions; (P) Promoted to 1970–71 Yugoslav Second League - South; (R) Relegated

== Higher leagues ==
On season 1969–70, six Montenegrin teams played in higher leagues of SFR Yugoslavia. All of them (Budućnost, Sutjeska, Lovćen, OFK Titograd, Tara Zabjelo and Jedinstvo) participated in 1969–70 Yugoslav Second League.

== See also ==
- Montenegrin Republic League
- Montenegrin Republic Cup (1947–2006)
- Montenegrin clubs in Yugoslav football competitions (1946–2006)
- Montenegrin Football Championship (1922–1940)
