= 1980–81 Montenegrin Republic League =

Montenegrin Republic League
- Season: 1980–81
- Dates: August 1980 - May 1981
- Champions: Mogren
- Relegated: Jedinstvo; Metalac; Tekstilac
- Matches played: 182
- Goals scored: 524 (2.88 per match)

The 1980–81 Montenegrin Republic League was 36th season of Montenegrin Republic League. Season started in August 1980 and finished in May 1981.

== Season ==
Locations of the 1980-81 Montenegrin Republic League teams

In Montenegrin Republic League 1980-81 participated 14 teams. Among the clubs which didn't play on previous season were three best sides from lower tier - Arsenal, Jezero and Titeks.
The title won Mogren, with five points more than Titeks

=== Table ===
Pos	Team	Pld	W	D	L	GF	GA	GD	Pts
1	Mogren (C, P)	26	16	5	5	55	35	+20	37
2	Titeks	26	12	8	6	36	19	+17	32
3	Čelik	26	12	7	7	47	32	+15	31
4	Bokelj	26	9	9	8	42	39	+3	27
5	Iskra	26	11	5	10	33	31	+2	27
6	Rudar	26	10	6	10	33	31	+2	26
7	Mornar	26	8	10	8	30	33	−3	26
8	Jezero	26	10	5	11	52	44	+8	25
9	Arsenal	26	9	7	10	54	47	+7	25
10	Zeta	26	8	9	9	26	27	−1	25
11	Petrovac	26	8	7	11	27	43	−16	23
12	Jedinstvo (R)	26	7	8	11	23	42	−19	22
13	Metalac (R)	26	8	5	13	38	51	−13	21
14	Tekstilac (R)	26	6	4	16	28	49	−21	16

(C) Champions; (P) Promoted; (R) Relegated

== Higher leagues ==
On season 1980–81, four Montenegrin teams played in higher leagues of SFR Yugoslavia. Budućnost participated in 1980–81 Yugoslav First League, while three other teams (Sutjeska, OFK Titograd and Lovćen) played in 1980–81 Yugoslav Second League.

== See also ==
- Montenegrin Republic League
- Montenegrin Republic Cup (1947–2006)
- Montenegrin clubs in Yugoslav football competitions (1946–2006)
- Montenegrin Football Championship (1922–1940)
