= 1951 Montenegrin Republic League =

Montenegrin Republic League
- Season: 1951
- Dates: 23 March – 22 June 1951
- Champions: Radnički Ivangrad
- Matches played: 30
- Goals scored: 131 (4.37 per match)

The 1951 Montenegrin Republic League was the sixth season, of the Montenegrin Republic League, that began in March 1951 and ended in June same year.

== Season ==
Locations of the 1951 Montenegrin Republic League teams

On season 1951, in Republic League participated six teams - three, two or one best-placed from three different qualifying group.

=== Qualifiers ===
In the qualifiers participated 14 teams. They were a part of three regional qualifying groups (zones). Two best-placed teams from each group gained promotion to 1951 Montenegrin Republic League.

==== Group 1 ====
In qualifying group 1 played teams from Northern Montenegro. At the end, Radnički Ivangrad and Bratstvo Bijelo Polje qualified for Republic League.

Pos	Team	Pld	W	D	L	GF	GA	GD	Pts
1	Radnički Ivangrad (Q)	6	4	2	0	15	4	+11	10
2	Bratstvo Bijelo Polje (Q)	6	3	2	1	17	7	+10	8
3	Breznik	6	3	0	3	11	13	−2	6
4	Gorštak	6	0	0	6	7	26	−19	0

(Q) Qualified for 1951 Montenegrin Republic League

==== Group 2 ====
In qualifying group 2 played teams from Central Montenegro. At the end, Sutjeska and Lovćen qualified for Republic League. Additionally, as second-placed team from Group 3 withdrew from competition, Iskra as a best third-placed team gained promotion to Republic League. During the qualifiers, Sutjeska defeated Dečić 10-0 and that was the highest win on 1951 season.

Pos	Team	Pld	W	D	L	GF	GA	GD	Pts
1	Sutjeska (Q)	8	7	1	0	30	5	+25	15
2	Lovćen (Q)	8	6	1	1	25	4	+21	13
3	Iskra (Q)	8	4	0	4	26	13	+13	8
4	Napredak Golubovci	8	2	0	6	13	27	−14	4
5	Dečić	8	0	0	8	10	55	−45	0

(Q) Qualified for 1951 Montenegrin Republic League

==== Group 3 ====
In qualifying group 3 played teams from coastal Montenegro. At the end, Arsenal qualified for Republic League. Second placed Primorac Bijela withdrew after the qualifiers, due to financial and technical difficulties to play in Montenegrin Republic League.

Pos	Team	Pld	W	D	L	GF	GA	GD	Pts
1	Arsenal (Q)	6	6	0	0	35	5	+30	12
2	Primorac Bijela	6	4	0	2	15	15	0	8
3	Mornar	7	3	0	4	14	16	−2	6
4	Jedinstvo	7	2	0	5	11	19	−8	4
5	Mogren	6	1	0	5	5	25	−20	2

(Q) Qualified for 1951 Montenegrin Republic League

=== Championship ===
During the sixth edition of Montenegrin Republic League, four teams struggled for the title until the last week of championship - Radnički, Sutjeska, Bratstvo and Lovćen. At the end, after the home victory against Sutjeska (3-2) in the final week of championship, Radnički won the season, with only single point more than teams from positions 2-4. With that success, Radnički for the first time played in qualifiers for Yugoslav Second League.

==== Table ====
Pos	Team	Pld	W	D	L	GF	GA	GD	Pts
1	Radnički Ivangrad (C, Q)	10	6	0	4	32	25	+7	12
2	Sutjeska	10	5	1	4	22	13	+9	11
3	Bratstvo Bijelo Polje	10	5	1	4	28	17	+11	11
4	Lovćen	10	4	3	3	17	21	−4	11
5	Iskra	10	4	1	5	18	16	+2	9
6	Arsenal	10	3	0	7	14	32	−18	6

(C) Champions; (Q) Qualified for the phase indicated

=== Results ===
Radnički finished season with four defeats. Most goals (10) was seen on the game Radnički - Lovćen (8-2).

Home \ Away	RAD	SUT	BRA	LOV	ISK	ARS
RAD		3–2	3–0	8–2	4–2	7–2
SUT	4–0		2–1	2–0	3–0	3–0
BRA	3–0	3–2		6–1	4–1	8–1
LOV	3–0	1–1	2–2		2–0	3–0
ISK	1–4	2–1	4–1	1–1		3–0
ARS	6–3	3–2	1–0	1–2	0–1	

Legend: Blue = home team win; Yellow = draw; Red = away team win.

=== Qualifiers for Yugoslav Second League ===
Radnički played in qualifiers for Yugoslav Second League. They played against Second League side Bokelj. After two games, Radnički failed to gain their first-ever promotion to second-tier competition.

Round	Team 1	Team 2	Home	Away
First leg	Radnički Ivangrad	Bokelj Kotor	2:1	0:3

== Higher leagues ==
On season 1951, two Montenegrin teams played in higher leagues of SFR Yugoslavia. Both of them (Budućnost and Bokelj) participated in 1951 Yugoslav Second League.

== See also ==
- Montenegrin Republic League
- Montenegrin Republic Cup (1947–2006)
- Montenegrin clubs in Yugoslav football competitions (1946–2006)
- Montenegrin Football Championship (1922–1940)
