= 1967–68 Montenegrin Republic League =

Montenegrin Republic League
- Season: 1967–68
- Dates: August 1967 - May 1968
- Champions: Titograd
- Matches: 132
- Goals: 531 (4.02 per match)

The 1967–68 Montenegrin Republic League was 23rd season of Montenegrin Republic League. Season started in August 1967 and finished in May 1968.

== Season ==
Locations of the 1967-68 Montenegrin Republic League teams

Just like during the previous season, Republic League had 12 members. But, due to reorganisation of Yugoslav Second League from season 1968-69 and creating the four groups, three best-placed teams from 1967–68 Montenegrin Republic League gained promotion to highest tier.
On season 1967–68, new members of Montenegrin Republic League were Ibar and Tara Zabjelo.
At the end of 22 weeks long competition, OFK Titograd won the title and, except them, Čelik and Jedinstvo gained promotion to Yugoslav Second League.
As three teams were promoted to higher rank, no one was relegated from Montenegrin Republic League.

=== Table ===
Pos	Team	Pld	W	D	L	GF	GA	GD	Pts
1	Titograd (C, P)	22	18	1	3	67	17	+50	37
2	Čelik (P)	22	16	2	4	59	24	+35	34
3	Jedinstvo (P)	22	11	2	9	60	35	+25	24
4	Mornar	22	9	5	8	53	37	+16	23
5	Ivangrad	22	9	5	8	38	35	+3	23
6	Iskra	22	8	6	8	40	39	+1	22
7	Bokelj	22	9	3	10	40	36	+4	21
8	Rudar	22	8	5	9	34	42	−8	21
9	Tara Zabjelo	22	6	7	9	33	44	−11	19
10	Dečić	22	8	1	13	44	53	−9	17
11	Ibar	22	6	1	15	39	88	−49	13
12	Spuž	22	4	2	16	24	81	−57	10

(C) Champions; (P) Promoted to 1968–69 Yugoslav Second League - South

== Higher leagues ==
On season 1967–68, three Montenegrin teams played in higher leagues of SFR Yugoslavia. All of them (Sutjeska, Budućnost and Lovćen) participated in 1967–68 Yugoslav Second League.

== See also ==
- Montenegrin Republic League
- Montenegrin Republic Cup (1947–2006)
- Montenegrin clubs in Yugoslav football competitions (1946–2006)
- Montenegrin Football Championship (1922–1940)
