= 1952 Montenegrin Republic League =

Montenegrin Republic League
- Season: 1952
- Dates: March – June 1952
- Champions: Budućnost
- Matches: 26
- Goals: 108 (4.15 per match)

The 1952 Montenegrin Republic League was the seventh season, of the Montenegrin Republic League, that began in March 1952 and ended in June same year.

== Season ==
Locations of the 1952 Montenegrin Republic League teams

At the end of season 1951, Football Association of Yugoslavia disbanded Yugoslav Second League. So, Montenegrin teams from higher level (Budućnost and Bokelj) were moved to Montenegrin Republic League. In season 1952, Republic League was second-tier competition in Yugoslav Second League, which meant that the winner of competition will play qualifiers for Yugoslav First League.
Except Budućnost and Bokelj, members of 1952 Montenegrin Republic League were Sutjeska, Lovćen, Iskra, Bratstvo Bijelo Polje, Radnički Ivangrad and Arsenal.

=== Qualifiers ===
While seven members placed directly, Arsenal gained participation in 1952 season through qualifiers. Below are the results of qualifying rounds.
Round one: Mladost - Breznik 0-0, 0-4; Jedinstvo - Arsenal 0-0, 0-2.
Semifinals: Arsenal - Mornar 5-0, 3-3; Breznik - Gorštak 2-0, 7-1.
Qualifier finals: Breznik - Arsenal 1-0, 0-2.

=== First phase ===
For the first time in history, Montenegrin Republic League was divided into two regional groups during the First phase of competition.
The Northern group teams wee: Budućnost, Bratstvo, Iskra and Radnički. The Southern group teams were: Sutjeska, Lovćen, Arsenal and Bokelj.

==== Northern group ====
As a former member of Yugoslav First League, Budućnost dominated in Northern group competition. During the third week, guest players attacked the referee on game Iskra - Radnički in Danilovgrad. That was the reason why Radnički was disqualified from the rest of competition.
Budućnost finished group with five wins and one defeat. Most goals (9) was seen on the game Budućnost - Bratstvo (9-0).

Pos	Team	Pld	W	D	L	GF	GA	GD	Pts	BUD	ISK	BRA	RAD
1	Budućnost (F)	6	5	0	1	21	6	+15	10		2–1	9–0	3–0
2	Iskra	6	4	0	2	16	8	+8	8	1–3		3–0	4–0
3	Bratstvo Bijelo Polje	6	2	0	4	8	22	−14	4	1–0	3–4		1–6
4	Radnički Ivangrad	6	1	0	5	7	23	−16	2	3–4	0–3	0–3	

(F) Qualified for 1952 Montenegrin Republic League finals

==== Southern group ====
Until the last week, three teams had chances to win the first place in Southern group. At the end, the winner was Sutjeska, with one point more than Lovćen and Bokelj.
Sutjeska finished group with four wins and two defeats. Most goals (7) was seen on the game Lovćen - Arsenal (7-0).

Pos	Team	Pld	W	D	L	GF	GA	GD	Pts	SUT	LOV	BOK	ARS
1	Sutjeska (F)	6	4	0	2	17	8	+9	8		3–1	3–1	5–1
2	Lovćen	6	3	1	2	15	9	+6	7	2–1		1–1	7–0
3	Bokelj	6	3	1	2	11	10	+1	7	3–1	2–1		3–1
4	Arsenal	6	1	0	5	7	23	−16	2	0–4	2–3	3–1	

(F) Qualified for 1952 Montenegrin Republic League finals

=== Championship finals ===
Finalists of 1952 Montenegrin Republic League were Budućnost and Sutjeska. Two Montenegrin Derby games decided about the title and about the team which participated in the qualifiers for 1953 Yugoslav First League.
Budućnost made significant result in the first final game (3-0) in Titograd. Second match finished with another win of Budućnost (2-1).

June 08, 1952

Budućnost	3 — 0	Sutjeska

Stadion pod Goricom, Titograd
Attendance: 5,000
June 15, 1952

Sutjeska	1 — 2	Budućnost

Stadion kraj Bistrice, Nikšić
Attendance: 3,000

As a winner of Montenegrin Republic League, Budućnost participated in qualifiers for Yugoslav First League.

=== Qualifiers for Yugoslav First League ===
In the qualifiers, Budućnost played against champions of Republic Leagues of SR Serbia (Spartak Subotica and SR Macedonia (Pobeda Prilep. After four games, Budućnost and Spartak have equal points at the top of the table, but the team from Subotica had better goal difference. So, Budućnost failed to make a comeback to Yugoslav First League.

Team 1	Team 2	Home	Away
Budućnost Titograd	Pobeda Prilep	5:2	1:6
Spartak Subotica	Budućnost Titograd	1:1	3:4

== See also ==
- Montenegrin Republic League
- Montenegrin Republic Cup (1947–2006)
- Montenegrin clubs in Yugoslav football competitions (1946–2006)
- Montenegrin Football Championship (1922–1940)
