= 1947–48 Montenegrin Republic League =

Third season of the Montenegrin Republic League

Montenegrin Republic League
- Season: 1947–48
- Dates: October 1947 – May 1948
- Champions: Bokelj
- Matches: 23
- Goals: 76 (3.3 per match)

The 1947–48 Montenegrin Republic League was the third season of Montenegrin Republic League. The season began in October 1947 and ended in May 1948.

== Season ==
Locations of the 1947-48 Montenegrin Republic League teams

=== Qualifiers ===
Except five teams which played in previous season (Sutjeska, Bokelj, Lovćen, Arsenal and Jakić), Football Association of Montenegro planned sixt place in Montenegrin Republic League 1947-48. So, sixth participant was the winner of republic qualifiers in which played 10 different teams - Jadran (Herceg Novi), Mogren (Budva), Tempo (Bar), Strugar (Ulcinj), Tršo (Bijelo Polje), IKA (Berane), Dečić (Tuzi), Kom (Andrijevica), Iskra (Danilovgrad) and Durmitor (Šavnik).
In the final game of qualifiers, Jadran Herceg Novi defeated Tempo Bar (2-1) and gained promotion to Republic League.

=== Championship ===
In third edition of Montenegrin Republic League played six different teams. For the first time, among participants was Jadran from Herceg Novi.
After many irregularities, some games were not played and the champions' title won Bokelj. They won the champions' battle against Lovćen.
As a last placed team, Jadran was relegated to lowest-tier competitions.

==== Table ====
Pos	Team	Pld	W	D	L	GF	GA	GD	Pts
1	Bokelj (C, Q)	8	6	1	1	21	6	+15	13
2	Lovćen	8	5	2	1	15	7	+8	12
3	Jakić	8	3	1	4	13	17	−4	7
4	Sutjeska	7	2	2	3	8	9	−1	6
5	Arsenal	7	1	2	4	9	14	−5	4
6	Jadran	8	2	0	6	10	30	−20	4

(C) Champions; (Q) Place in qualifiers for 1948–49 Yugoslav Second League

=== Qualifiers for Yugoslav Second League ===
Bokelj played in qualifiers for Yugoslav Second League. In first leg, team from Kotor played against Podrinje.

Round	Team 1	Team 2	Home	Away
First leg	Podrinje Šabac	Bokelj Kotor	3:0	2:3

== Higher leagues ==
On season 1947–48, one Montenegrin team played in higher leagues of SFR Yugoslavia. That was Budućnost, which participated in 1947–48 Yugoslav Second League.

== See also ==
- Montenegrin Republic League
- Montenegrin Republic Cup (1947–2006)
- Montenegrin clubs in Yugoslav football competitions (1946–2006)
- Montenegrin Football Championship (1922–1940)
