= 1953–54 Montenegrin Republic League =

Montenegrin Republic League
- Season: 1953–54
- Dates: September 1953 – April 1954
- Champions: Bokelj
- Matches played: 56
- Goals scored: 220 (3.93 per match)

The 1953–54 Montenegrin Republic League was 9th season of Montenegrin Republic League. Season began in September 1953 and ended in April 1954.

== Season ==
Locations of the 1953–54 Montenegrin Republic League teams

For the first time after season 1948–49, Montenegrin Republic League played during the two half-seasons (autumn – spring).
As previous season winner and runner-up (Budućnost and Lovćen) played in Yugoslav Second League, among the eight members of 1953–54 Montenegrin Republic League were Sutjeska, Bokelj, Arsenal, Breznik, Iskra, Mornar, Radnički Ivangrad and Jedinstvo Herceg Novi.
From the very beginning of season, Bokelj and Sutjeska were two best-placed teams. After 14 weeks long championship, Bokelj won the title, with only one point more than second placed team from Nikšić.

=== Table ===
Pos	Team	Pld	W	D	L	GF	GA	GD	Pts
1	Bokelj (C, Q)	14	12	1	1	38	10	+28	25
2	Sutjeska	14	11	2	1	36	6	+30	24
3	Arsenal	14	7	1	6	33	31	+2	15
4	Iskra	14	5	2	7	20	25	−5	12
5	Breznik	14	5	1	8	21	31	−10	11
6	Jedinstvo Herceg Novi	14	3	4	7	20	26	−6	10
7	Mornar	14	3	1	10	17	39	−22	7
8	Radnički Ivangrad	14	2	2	10	16	33	−17	6

(C) Champions; (Q) Place in qualifiers for 1954–55 Yugoslav Second League

=== Qualifiers for Yugoslav Second League ===
In the qualifiers for Second League, Bokelj played against the winner of Republic League of SR Slovenia – Ljubljana. Montenegrin representative was better in two games and made comeback to Yugoslav Second League. With that success, season 1954–55 was first in which Montenegro had three clubs in Federal competitions of SFR Yugoslavia.

Team 1	Team 2	Home	Away
Ljubljana	Bokelj Kotor	0:0	0:2

== Higher leagues ==
On season 1953–54, two Montenegrin teams played in higher leagues of SFR Yugoslavia. Both of them (Budućnost and Lovćen) played in 1953–54 Yugoslav Second League.

== See also ==
- Montenegrin Republic League
- Montenegrin Republic Cup (1947–2006)
- Montenegrin clubs in Yugoslav football competitions (1946–2006)
- Montenegrin Football Championship (1922–1940)
