= 1978–79 Montenegrin Republic League =

Montenegrin Republic League
- Season: 1978–79
- Dates: August 1978 - May 1979
- Champions: Titograd
- Relegated: Arsenal; Dečić; Igalo
- Matches: 182
- Goals: 537 (2.95 per match)

The 1978–79 Montenegrin Republic League was the 34th season of Montenegrin Republic League. The season started in August 1978 and finished in May 1979.

== Season ==
Locations of the 1977-78 Montenegrin Republic League teams

In Montenegrin Republic League 1978-79 participated 14 teams. Among the clubs which didn't play on previous season were Lovćen (relegated from Yugoslav Second League) and three best teams from lower tier - Igalo, Ulcinj and Rudar. The title won OFK Titograd, with five points more than Iskra

=== Table ===
Pos	Team	Pld	W	D	L	GF	GA	GD	Pts
1	Titograd (C, P)	26	18	7	1	59	10	+49	43
2	Iskra	26	16	5	5	54	24	+30	37
3	Lovćen	26	12	5	9	42	24	+18	29
4	Tekstilac	26	11	7	8	38	28	+10	29
5	Zeta	26	11	4	11	37	33	+4	26
6	Čelik	26	12	2	12	38	42	−4	26
7	Rudar	26	7	11	8	36	40	−4	25
8	Ulcinj	26	8	8	10	36	45	−9	24
9	Bokelj	26	7	10	9	37	50	−13	24
10	Mogren	26	10	3	13	38	39	−1	23
11	Petrovac	26	8	7	11	36	42	−6	23
12	Arsenal (R)	26	7	9	10	23	42	−19	23
13	Dečić (R)	26	7	4	15	43	54	−11	18
14	Igalo (R)	26	4	6	16	20	44	−24	14

(C) Champions; (P) Promoted; (R) Relegated

== Higher leagues ==
On season 1978–79, three Montenegrin teams played in higher leagues of SFR Yugoslavia. Budućnost participated in 1978–79 Yugoslav First League, while two other teams (Sutjeska and Jedinstvo) participated in 1978–79 Yugoslav Second League.

== See also ==
- Montenegrin Republic League
- Montenegrin Republic Cup (1947–2006)
- Montenegrin clubs in Yugoslav football competitions (1946–2006)
- Montenegrin Football Championship (1922–1940)
