= 1946–47 Montenegrin Republic League =

Montenegrin Republic League
- Season: 1946–47
- Dates: October 1946 – May 1947
- Champions: Sutjeska
- Matches: 20
- Goals: 72 (3.6 per match)

The 1946–47 Montenegrin Republic League was second season of Montenegrin Republic League. The season began in October 1946 and ended in May 1947.

== Season ==
Locations of the 1946–47 Montenegrin Republic League teams

After Budućnost won the title of 1946 season champion and gained promotion to Yugoslav First League, Lovćen, Sutjeska and Arsenal remained members of Montenegrin First League. New participants of competition were Velimir Jakić and Bokelj.
Eight-week long season finished with the very first title for FK Sutjeska. Th team from Nikšić won the first-place battle against FK Bokelj, which lasted until the week 8.
Anyway, at the end of season, both teams (Sutjeska and Bokelj) played in qualifiers for Yugoslav First League.

=== Table ===
Pos	Team	Pld	W	D	L	GF	GA	GD	Pts
1	Sutjeska (C, Q)	8	6	1	1	19	9	+10	13
2	Bokelj (Q)	8	5	1	2	14	14	0	11
3	Lovćen	8	4	1	3	21	13	+8	9
4	Arsenal	8	2	1	5	13	20	−7	5
5	Velimir Jakić	8	1	0	7	5	16	−11	2

(C) Champions; (Q) Place in qualifiers for 1947–48 Yugoslav First League

=== Results ===
Sutjeska finished season without one lost game, while FK Velimir Jakić won only one match with seven loses. Most goals (11) was seen on the game Arsenal – Lovćen (3-8).

Home \ Away	SUT	BOK	LOV	ARS	JAK
SUT		5–1	2–1	4–3	2–0
BOK	1–1		2–1	2–0	2–1
LOV	2–4	4–1		1–1	3–0
ARS	1–0	1–2	3–8		4–0
JAK	0–1	1–3	0–1	3–0	

Legend: Blue = home team win; Yellow = draw; Red = away team win.

=== Qualifiers for Yugoslav First League ===
Sutjeska and Bokelj played in qualifiers for the top-tier. In the first leg, teams from Montenegro played each other. Bokelj was eliminated in first leg, and Sutjeska in second. Below are their results in the qualifiers.

Round	Team 1	Team 2	Home	Away
Quarterfinals	Sutjeska Nikšić	Bokelj Kotor	3:1	2:1
Semifinals	Sutjeska Nikšić	Torpedo Sarajevo	2:2	1:6

== Higher leagues ==
On inaugural season of Yugoslav football system, there was only one competition. That was 1946–47 Yugoslav First League, and Budućnost was a representative of SR Montenegro in top-tier.

== See also ==
- Montenegrin Republic League
- Montenegrin Republic Cup (1947–2006)
- Montenegrin clubs in Yugoslav football competitions (1946–2006)
- Montenegrin Football Championship (1922–1940)
