= FK Grafičar =

FK Grafičar may refer to:

- RFK Grafičar Beograd, Serbian football club based in Belgrade
- FK Grafičar Podgorica, Montenegrin football club based in Podgorica
