= 2007–08 Montenegrin Second League =

Montenegrin Second League
- Season: 2007–08
- Champions: Jezero
- Promoted: Jezero; Jedinstvo
- Relegated: Gusinje; Tekstilac
- Matches played: 198
- Goals scored: 434 (2.19 per match)

The 2007–08 Montenegrin Second League (Serbian: Druga Crnogorska Liga / Друга црногорска лига) was the second season since its establishment. The league played its first games of the season on August 11, 2007 and its final matches were played on May 24, 2008.

== Format of competition ==
Twelve teams participate in this league. The top team directly qualifies for the Montenegrin First League while the second and third teams contest in a two matches playoff against the 11th and 12th team from the First League. The two bottom-placed teams are relegated to the Third League, to be replaced by the two winners of the Third League promotion play-off.

== Teams ==
Locations of the 2007–08 teams

The following 12 clubs competed in this season.

Club	City	Stadium	Capacity
Arsenal	Tivat	Stadion u Parku	2,000
Berane	Berane	Gradski stadion	11,000
Bratstvo Cijevna	Podgorica	Stadion Bratstva	200
Crvena Stijena	Podgorica	Stadion Tološi	700
Čelik	Nikšić	Stadion Željezare	2,000
Gusinje	Gusinje	Gradski stadion	2,000
Ibar	Rožaje	Bandžovo Brdo	4,000
Jedinstvo	Bijelo Polje	Gradski stadion	5,000
Jezero	Plav	Stadion Pod Racinom	5,000
Otrant	Ulcinj	Stadion Olympic	1,500
Tekstilac	Bijelo Polje	Gradski stadion	5,000
Zabjelo	Podgorica	Stadion Zabjela	300

== League table ==
Pos	Team	Pld	W	D	L	GF	GA	GD	Pts	Promotion or relegation
1	Jezero (C, P)	33	19	7	7	41	20	+21	64	Promotion to the First League
2	Čelik	33	18	6	9	48	27	+21	60	Qualification for the promotion play-offs
3	Jedinstvo (P)	33	17	8	8	47	22	+25	59	Qualification for the promotion play-offs
4	Berane	33	15	10	8	40	21	+19	55	
5	Ibar (Note: Ibar 1 point deducted because of award match round 10.)	33	15	5	13	44	39	+5	49	
6	Zabjelo	33	12	12	9	40	45	−5	48	
7	Bratstvo	33	12	4	17	44	48	−4	40	
8	Crvena Stijena (Note: Crvena Stijena 1 point deducted because of award round 9.)	33	10	10	13	23	30	−7	39	
9	Arsenal	33	9	11	13	28	30	−2	38	
10	Otrant	33	9	9	15	39	52	−13	36	
11	Gusinje (Note: Gusinje 1 point deducted because of award match round 26.) (R)	33	7	10	16	23	45	−22	30	Relegation to the Third League
12	Tekstilac (R)	33	6	6	21	20	58	−38	24	Relegation to the Third League

Rules for classification: 1) Points; 2) Head-to-head points; 3) Head-to-head goal difference; 4) Head-to-head goals scored; 5) Head-to-head away goals scored; 6) Goal difference; 7) Goals scored; 8) Draw.
(C) Champions; (P) Promoted; (R) Relegated

== Results ==
The schedule consists of three rounds. During the first two rounds, each team played each other once home-and-away for a total of 22 games. The pairings of the third round were then set according to the standings after the first two rounds, giving every team a third game against each opponent for a total of 33 games per team.

=== First and second round ===
Home \ Away	ARS	BER	BRA	CRS	ČEL	GUS	IBA	JED	JEZ	OTR	TEK	ZAB
Arsenal		1–0	2–0	0–0	0–0	0–0	0–1	3–0	0–0	1–0	1–2	1–1
Berane	1–0		1–1	2–0	3–1	4–0	2–0	2–2	0–1	1–0	2–0	0–0
Bratstvo	0–3	2–1		0–1	0–2	0–1	2–3	0–3	1–2	6–0	3–1	2–1
Crvena Stijena	2–0	0–1	0–0		1–2	1–0	0–0	0–2	1–0	1–1	0–3 (Note: Match awarded.)	1–1
Čelik	1–1	2–1	2–1	2–0		1–1	1–0	1–0	1–0	0–0	1–0	6–1
Gusinje	2–0	0–0	0–2	0–2	1–1		1–2	2–1	0–0	3–4	0–0	0–2
Ibar	1–0	1–0	1–1	2–0	1–0	3–0		0–2	0–1	1–2	5–0	2–2
Jedinstvo	1–1	0–0	2–0	2–0	1–0	3–1	0–0		1–0	3–0	4–0	0–0
Jezero	1–1	1–4	3–0	3–0	3–1	2–1	2–0	1–0		1–0	2–0	2–1
Otrant	0–2	1–1	2–2	1–1	2–0	2–2	0–0	4–2	0–2		1–0	1–2
Tekstilac	2–2	0–0	1–0	0–1	1–0	0–0	1–3	0–2	0–1	1–1		3–1
Zabjelo	1–1	0–0	3–2	1–3	1–4	0–0	3–0	1–0	1–1	1–0	3–2	

Legend: Blue = home team win; Yellow = draw; Red = away team win.

=== Third round ===
Home \ Away	ARS	BER	BRA	CRS	ČEL	GUS	IBA	JED	JEZ	OTR	TEK	ZAB
Arsenal				1–1	1–2		2–1		0–1		3–0	
Berane	0–1		2–1			2–0	1–0	1–1		3–0		
Bratstvo	1–0				1–0		4–2		2–1	5–2		
Crvena Stijena		1–2	1–0					0–0		1–1		1–0
Čelik		1–0		1–0		3–0			1–1		3–0	6–1
Gusinje	1–0		1–2	0–3 (Note: Match awarded.)						2–1	1–0	
Ibar				1–0	1–0	0–1			2–1		3–0	2–3
Jedinstvo	3–0		2–1		0–1	1–0	2–0			3–0		
Jezero		1–0		1–0		1–1		2–0			3–0	0–0
Otrant	3–0				3–1		2–3		1–0		4–0	
Tekstilac		0–1	0–2	0–0				1–4				2–1
Zabjelo	1–0	2–2	2–0			2–1		0–0		1–0		

Legend: Blue = home team win; Yellow = draw; Red = away team win.

== Promotion play-offs ==
The 3rd-placed team (against the 10th-placed team of the First League) and the runners-up (against the 11th-placed team of the First League) will both compete in two-legged promotion play-offs after the end of the season.

=== Summary ===
Team 1	Agg.	Team 2	1st leg	2nd leg
Sutjeska	1–0	Čelik	1–0	0–0
Bokelj	0–3	Jedinstvo	0–0	0–3 (w/o)

=== Matches ===
28 May 2008
17:30 CEST

Sutjeska	1–0	Čelik
Adrović 59'	Report (page 37)

Stadion kraj Bistrice, Nikšić
Attendance: 8,000
Referee: Ranko Spasojević
1 June 2008
17:30 CEST

Čelik	0–0	Sutjeska
	Report (page 37)

Stadion kraj Bistrice, Nikšić
Attendance: 9,000
Referee: Aleksandar Marković

Sutjeska won 1–0 on aggregate.

28 May 2008
17:30 CEST

Bokelj	0–0	Jedinstvo
	Report (page 37)

Stadion pod Vrmcem, Kotor
Attendance: 1,200
Referee: Aleksandar Marković
1 June 2008
17:30 CEST

Jedinstvo	3–0 Awarded (Note: The match was interrupted in the 85th minute with the score of 1–0, due to the attack of the visiting fans on the referee, it was registered with the official score of 3–0 in favor of Jedinstvo.)	Bokelj
Čindrak 80'	Report

Gradski stadion, Bijelo Polje
Attendance: 2,500

Jedinstvo won 3–0 on aggregate.
