= 1948–49 Montenegrin Republic League =

Montenegrin Republic League
- Season: 1948–49
- Dates: September 1948 – May 1949
- Champions: Sutjeska
- Matches played: 19
- Goals scored: 70 (3.68 per match)

The 1948–49 Montenegrin Republic League was fourth season of Montenegrin Republic League. The season began in September 1948 and ended in May 1949.

== Season ==
Locations of the 1948-49 Montenegrin Republic League teams

In the fourth edition of Montenegrin First League played eight different teams. For the first time, among participants were Iskra Danilovgrad, Tempo Bar and IKA Ivangrad, who won the qualifiers.
Many irregularities occurred during the season. Most matches were not played, so at the end, all the teams didn't play an equal number of games. However, the season was officially registered and two best placed teams participated in the qualifiers for Yugoslav Second and Third League. Champions' title won Sutjeska, who participated in qualifiers for Yugoslav Second League. Second-placed Lovćen went to qualifiers for Yugoslav Third League.
Arsenal and Tempo were relegated after the end of season and played in the qualifiers for Montenegrin Third League 1950.

=== Table ===
Pos	Team	Pld	W	D	L	GF	GA	GD	Pts
1	Sutjeska (C, Q)	7	6	1	0	20	2	+18	13
2	Lovćen (Q)	6	3	2	1	11	5	+6	8
3	Jakić	4	2	2	0	7	3	+4	6
4	Bokelj	6	3	0	3	13	11	+2	6
5	Arsenal	3	1	0	2	5	7	−2	2
6	Iskra	5	1	0	4	8	18	−10	2
7	IKA	3	0	1	2	2	6	−4	1
8	Tempo	4	0	0	4	4	18	−14	0

(C) Champions; (Q) Place in qualifiers for 1950 Yugoslav Second League or Yugoslav Third League

=== Qualifiers for Yugoslav Second League ===
Sutjeska played in qualifiers for Yugoslav Second League. Team from Nikšić participated in qualifying group with Željezničar (Sarajevo), 11 Oktomvri (Kumanovo) and Ljubljana. Sutjeska finished as a last-placed team, so they were promoted to Yugoslav Third League.

Team 1	Team 2	Home	Away
Sutjeska Nikšić	11 Oktomvri	0:3	3:0
Ljubljana	Sutjeska Nikšić	3:0	1:1
Sutjeska Nikšić	Željezničar	0:3	0:3

=== Qualifiers for Yugoslav Third League ===
Lovćen played in qualifiers for Yugoslav Third League. Team from Cetinje participated in qualifying group with HNK Šibenik and Ljubljana (Banja Luka). Lovćen finished as a last-placed team, so they remained a member of Montenegrin Republic League.

Team 1	Team 2	Home	Away
HNK Šibenik	Lovćen Cetinje	1:0	1:0
Lovćen Cetinje	Borac Banja Luka	2:4	0:3

== Higher leagues ==
On season 1948-49, one Montenegrin team played in higher leagues of SFR Yugoslavia. Budućnost was a participant of 1948–49 Yugoslav First League.

== See also ==
- Montenegrin Republic League
- Montenegrin Republic Cup (1947–2006)
- Montenegrin clubs in Yugoslav football competitions (1946–2006)
- Montenegrin Football Championship (1922–1940)
