= 2015–16 Montenegrin Second League =

Montenegrin Second League
- Season: 2015–16
- Champions: Jedinstvo
- Promoted: Jedinstvo
- Relegated: Brskovo; Mogren
- Matches played: 150
- Goals scored: 405 (2.7 per match)
- Top goalscorer: Danin Talović (Jezero) (12 goals)

The 2015–16 Montenegrin Second League was the tenth season since the establishment of the Montenegrin Second League. The season ran from 15 August 2015 to 29 May 2016.

== Format of competition ==
A total of 12 teams participate in this edition of the Second League. New members are FK Berane and FK Mogren who were relegated from 2014–15 Montenegrin First League, and winners of Montenegrin Third League playoffs - FK Brskovo and FK Grafičar Podgorica.

== Teams ==
Locations of the 2015–16 teams

The following 12 clubs competed in this season.

Club	City	Finishing in 2014–15	Stadium
Berane	Berane	12th in First League	Gradski stadion (11,000)
Bratstvo	Podgorica	10th	Stadion Bratstva (200)
Brskovo	Mojkovac	1st in Third League - North	Gradski stadion (1,000)
Cetinje	Cetinje	7th	Stadion Obilića Poljana (5,000)
Grafičar	Podgorica	1st in Third League - Center	Camp FSCG (1,250)
Ibar	Rožaje	8th	Bandžovo brdo (4,000)
Igalo	Igalo	3rd	Solila (1,600)
Jedinstvo	Bijelo Polje	4th	Gradski stadion (5,000)
Jezero	Plav	9th	Stadion Pod Racinom (5,000)
Kom	Podgorica	6th	Zlatica (1,000)
Mogren	Budva	11th in First League	Lugovi (5,000)
Radnički	Berane	5th	Gradski stadion (11,000)

== League table ==
Pos	Team	Pld	W	D	L	GF	GA	GD	Pts	Promotion or relegation
1	Jedinstvo (Note: Jedinstvo were deducted 1 point.) (C, P)	30	20	5	5	56	15	+41	64	Promotion to the First League
2	Cetinje	30	14	8	8	42	31	+11	50	Qualification for the promotion play-offs
3	Bratstvo	30	13	9	8	37	32	+5	48	Qualification for the promotion play-offs
4	Berane	30	11	8	11	45	52	−7	41	
5	Kom	30	10	10	10	27	31	−4	40	
6	Radnički	30	9	11	10	39	37	+2	38	
7	Grafičar	30	10	4	16	37	41	−4	34	
8	Ibar (Note: Ibar were deducted 1 point.)	30	10	9	11	36	48	−12	38	
9	Igalo	30	8	9	13	34	38	−4	33	
10	Jezero	30	8	7	15	29	46	−17	31	
11	Brskovo (R)	30	5	14	11	23	35	−12	29	Relegation to the Third League
12	Mogren (Note: Mogren were excluded from the league for not showing up at two matches because of financial problems that didn't allow them to pay salaries to players.) (R)	0	0	0	0	0	0	0	0	Relegation to the Third League

Source: Football Association of Montenegro (in Montenegrin)
Rules for classification: 1) Points; 2) Head-to-head points; 3) Head-to-head goal difference; 4) Head-to-head goals scored; 5) Head-to-head away goals scored; 6) Goal difference; 7) Goals scored; 8) Draw.
(C) Champions; (P) Promoted; (R) Relegated

== Results ==
The schedule consists of three rounds. During the first two rounds, each team played each other once home-and-away for a total of 22 games. The pairings of the third round were then set according to the standings after the first two rounds, giving every team a third game against each opponent for a total of 33 games per team.

=== First and second round ===
Home \ Away	BER	BRA	BRS	CET	GRA	IBA	IGA	JED	JEZ	KOM	MOG	RAD
Berane		2–2	4–2	3–2	2–0	3–4	1–1	0–1	0–2	4–1		3–1
Bratstvo	1–3		1–0	1–0	1–0	1–1	3–0	0–0	2–2	0–2		2–0
Brskovo	0–0	0–1		0–0	1–0	2–0	4–2	0–3	0–0	0–0		1–1
Cetinje	6–2	0–0	0–0		1–0	2–0	2–2	2–1	1–0	3–0		2–0
Grafičar	4–0	1–3	3–2	1–2		3–1	0–3	3–0	2–1	0–1		1–1
Ibar	0–0	2–4	1–1	2–3	1–1		4–2	1–0	2–1	2–1		0–0
Igalo	1–0	1–3	1–1	1–0	0–1	3–0		2–3	0–0	4–0		1–1
Jedinstvo	1–1	2–0	2–0	0–1	4–1	3–0	1–0		3–0	1–0		2–0
Jezero	1–0	1–4	2–1	1–2	2–1	4–1	0–2	1–2		2–2		1–2
Kom	0–1	0–0	2–0	0–0	1–3	0–0	1–1	1–0	0–1			0–0
Mogren												
Radnički	1–1	2–0	1–1	2–2	1–0	3–1	2–1	0–2	2–0	1–2		

Source: Football Association of Montenegro (in Montenegrin)
Legend: Blue = home team win; Yellow = draw; Red = away team win.

=== Third round ===
Home \ Away	BER	BRA	BRS	CET	GRA	IBA	IGA	JED	JEZ	KOM	MOG	RAD
Berane			3–1	3–2	3–0					2–2		0–3
Bratstvo	2–1					0–1	1–0	0–4	0–0			
Brskovo		1–1			0–2			1–1		2–1		2–1
Cetinje		2–0	0–0		2–0					2–1		1–3
Grafičar		1–2				0–0		0–2	3–1			1–1
Ibar	4–2		2–0	1–1			1–3		4–0			
Igalo	0–1		0–0	1–0	1–4					0–0		
Jedinstvo	6–0			3–0		0–0	2–0		2–0			
Jezero	1–1		0–0	3–1			1–0			0–1		
Kom		2–1			2–1	2–0		0–0				2–0
Mogren												
Radnički		1–1				2–3	1–1	1–2	5–1			

Source: Football Association of Montenegro (in Montenegrin)
Legend: Blue = home team win; Yellow = draw; Red = away team win.

== Promotion play-offs ==
The 3rd-placed team (against the 10th-placed team of the First League) and the runners-up (against the 11th-placed team of the First League) will both compete in two-legged promotion play-offs after the end of the season.

=== Summary ===
Team 1	Agg.	Team 2	1st leg	2nd leg
Bratstvo	2–8	Iskra	2–2	0–6
Cetinje	0–1	Petrovac	0–0	0–1

=== Matches ===
2 June 2016
17:30 CEST

Bratstvo	2–2	Iskra
Popović 58', 65'		Kljajić 55' (o.g.); Novović 60'

Stadion Trešnjica, Golubovci
Attendance: 500
Referee: Milovan Milačić
6 June 2016
17:30 CEST

Iskra	6–0	Bratstvo
Memčević 3', 62'; Novović 24'; Golubović 25'; Redžović 69'; Begović 84'

Stadion Braće Velašević, Danilovgrad
Attendance: 700
Referee: Milovan Milačić

Iskra won 8–2 on aggregate.

2 June 2016
17:30 CEST

Cetinje	0–0	Petrovac

Stadion Obilića Poljana, Cetinje
Attendance: 1,000
Referee: Miloš Savović
6 June 2016
17:30 CEST

Petrovac	1–0	Cetinje
Woo Sang-Hoon 53'

Stadion pod Malim brdom, Petrovac
Attendance: 800
Referee: Miloš Savović

Petrovac won 1–0 on aggregate.

== Top scorers ==
Rank	Scorer	Club	Goals
1	(Montenegro) Danin Talović	Jezero	12
2	(Montenegro) Stefan Đorđević	Jedinstvo	11
3	(Montenegro) Ilija Radunović	Jedinstvo	10
3	(Serbia) Vladan Savić	Berane	10
5	(Ukraine) Anatolii Korniichuk	Ibar	
6	(Serbia) Bojan Gajić	Berane	8
6	(Montenegro) Ivan Maraš	Bratstvo	8
6	(Montenegro) Nikola Vujović	Cetinje	8
