= 1954–55 Montenegrin Republic League =

Isotope

Montenegrin Republic League
- Season: 1954–55
- Dates: August 1954 – May 1955
- Champions: Sutjeska
- Matches: 56
- Goals: 220 (3.93 per match)

The 1954–55 Montenegrin Republic League was 10th season of Montenegrin Republic League. Season began in August 1954 and ended in May 1955.

== Season ==
Locations of the 1954-55 Montenegrin Republic League teams

Number of participants stay the same as in season 1953–54. Big change was made after the statement of Football Association of Yugoslavia about reorganising Yugoslav Second League, with model od five different groups (zones) from season 1955–56. With that decision, six teams from Montenegrin Republic League 1954-55 expected a promotion to Second League.
On season 1954–55, for the first time in Montenegrin Republic League participated OFK Titograd (under the name Mladost Titograd) and Radnički Nikšić.
Tenth edition of Montenegrin Republic League won Sutjeska, who finished championship undefeated. Except them, promotion to newly structured Yugoslav Second League gained five another teams. Iskra gained promotion to higher level too, but due to technical difficulties they quit. Their place was taken by Arsenal.

=== Table ===
Pos	Team	Pld	W	D	L	GF	GA	GD	Pts
1	Sutjeska (C, Q)	14	12	2	0	48	18	+30	26
2	Mladost (Q)	14	6	4	4	25	19	+6	16
3	Radnički Nikšić (Q)	14	5	4	5	37	21	+16	14
4	Radnički Ivangrad (Q)	14	6	2	6	27	27	0	14
5	Jedinstvo Herceg Novi (Q)	14	6	1	7	27	32	−5	13
6	Iskra	14	6	1	7	16	32	−16	13
7	Arsenal (Q)	14	4	2	8	23	35	−12	10
8	Mornar	14	3	0	11	17	36	−19	6

(C) Champions; (Q) Qualified for promotion to 1955–56 Yugoslav Second League

== Higher leagues ==
On season 1954–55, three Montenegrin teams played in higher leagues of SFR Yugoslavia. All of them (Budućnost, Lovćen and Bokelj) played in 1954–55 Yugoslav Second League.

== See also ==
- Montenegrin Republic League
- Montenegrin Republic Cup (1947–2006)
- Montenegrin clubs in Yugoslav football competitions (1946–2006)
- Montenegrin Football Championship (1922–1940)
