= 1959–60 Yugoslav Second League =

Yugoslav Second League
- Season: 1959–60
- Champions: RNK Split (West Division); Vardar (East Division)
- Promoted: RNK Split; Vardar
- Relegated: Igman Ilidža; Elektrostroj; Proleter Zrenjanin; Napredak Kruševac

The 1959–60 Yugoslav Second League season was the 14th season of the Second Federal League (Serbo-Croatian: Druga savezna liga), the second level association football competition of SFR Yugoslavia, since its establishment in 1946. The league was contested in two regional groups (West Division and East Division), with 12 clubs each.

== West Division ==
=== Teams ===
A total of twelve teams contested the league, including nine sides from the 1958–59 season, one club relegated from the 1958–59 Yugoslav First League and two sides promoted from the third tier leagues played in the 1958–59 season. The league was contested in a double round robin format, with each club playing every other club twice, for a total of 22 rounds. Two points were awarded for wins and one point for draws.

Željezničar Sarajevo were relegated from the 1958–59 Yugoslav First League after finishing in the 11th place of the league table. The two clubs promoted to the second level were Igman Ilidža and Varteks.

Locations of teams' home cities in the 1959–60 Yugoslav Second League West

Team	Location	Federal subject	Position in 1958–59
Borac Banja Luka	Banja Luka	SR Bosnia and Herzegovina	5th
Elektrostroj	Zagreb	SR Croatia	4th
Igman Ilidža	Ilidža	SR Bosnia and Herzegovina	—
Lokomotiva	Zagreb	SR Croatia	2nd
Odred Ljubljana	Ljubljana	SR Slovenia	10th
Proleter Osijek	Osijek	SR Croatia	9th
RNK Split	Split	SR Croatia	3rd
Šibenik	Šibenik	SR Croatia	8th
Trešnjevka	Zagreb	SR Croatia	6th
Varteks	Varaždin	SR Croatia	—
NK Zagreb	Zagreb	SR Croatia	7th
Željezničar Sarajevo	Sarajevo	SR Bosnia and Herzegovina	—

=== League table ===
Pos	Team	Pld	W	D	L	GF	GA	GD	Pts	Promotion or relegation
1	RNK Split (C, P)	22	16	2	4	60	24	+36	34	Promotion to Yugoslav First League
2	Trešnjevka	22	13	3	6	43	29	+14	29	
3	Borac Banja Luka	22	13	2	7	55	34	+21	28	
4	Željezničar	22	11	3	8	33	29	+4	25	
5	Šibenik	22	11	2	9	44	36	+8	24	
6	Proleter Osijek	22	9	4	9	44	36	+8	22	
7	Varteks	22	8	5	9	30	41	−11	21	
8	Lokomotiva	22	7	6	9	37	37	0	20	
9	NK Zagreb	22	8	3	11	46	54	−8	19	
10	Odred	22	8	1	13	26	44	−18	17	
11	Igman Ilidža (R)	22	6	2	14	32	46	−14	14	Relegation to Third Level
12	Elektrostroj (R)	22	4	3	15	22	53	−31	11	Relegation to Third Level

Source: fsgzrenjanin.com
Rules for classification: 1) points; 2) goal difference; 3) number of goals scored.
(C) Champions; (P) Promoted; (R) Relegated

== East Division ==
=== Teams ===
A total of twelve teams contested the league, including nine sides from the 1958–59 season, one club relegated from the 1958–59 Yugoslav First League and two sides promoted from the third tier leagues played in the 1958–59 season. The league was contested in a double round robin format, with each club playing every other club twice, for a total of 22 rounds. Two points were awarded for wins and one point for draws.

Vardar were relegated from the 1958–59 Yugoslav First League after finishing in the 12th place of the league table. The two clubs promoted to the second level were Mačva Šabac and Pobeda.

Locations of teams' home cities in the 1959–60 Yugoslav Second League East

Team	Location	Federal subject	Position in 1958–59
Mačva Šabac	Šabac	SR Serbia	—
Napredak Kruševac	Kruševac	SR Serbia	5th
Novi Sad	Novi Sad	(Socialist Republic of Serbia) SAP Vojvodina	4th
Pobeda	Prilep	SR Macedonia	—
Proleter Zrenjanin	Zrenjanin	(Socialist Republic of Serbia) SAP Vojvodina	8th
Radnički Kragujevac	Kragujevac	SR Serbia	7th
Radnički Niš	Niš	SR Serbia	9th
Radnički Sombor	Sombor	(Socialist Republic of Serbia) SAP Vojvodina	3rd
Spartak Subotica	Subotica	(Socialist Republic of Serbia) SAP Vojvodina	2nd
Srem	Sremska Mitrovica	(Socialist Republic of Serbia) SAP Vojvodina	6th
Sutjeska	Nikšić	SR Montenegro	10th
Vardar	Skopje	SR Macedonia	—

=== League table ===
Pos	Team	Pld	W	D	L	GF	GA	GD	Pts	Promotion or relegation
1	Vardar (C, P)	22	13	3	6	49	29	+20	29	Promotion to Yugoslav First League
2	Novi Sad	22	13	2	7	59	36	+23	28	
3	Sutjeska Nikšić	22	12	2	8	32	46	−14	26	
4	Pobeda	22	9	6	7	47	41	+6	24	
5	Spartak Subotica	22	9	5	8	48	31	+17	23	
6	Mačva Šabac	22	8	7	7	32	25	+7	23	
7	Radnički Sombor	22	10	2	10	44	42	+2	22	
8	Srem	22	9	3	10	44	43	+1	21	
9	Radnički Niš	22	7	6	9	43	46	−3	20	
10	Radnički Kragujevac	22	7	6	9	33	45	−12	20	
11	Proleter Zrenjanin (R)	22	7	4	11	26	37	−11	18	Relegation to Third Level
12	Napredak Kruševac (R)	22	2	6	14	29	65	−36	10	Relegation to Third Level

Source: fsgzrenjanin.com
Rules for classification: 1) points; 2) goal difference; 3) number of goals scored.
(C) Champions; (P) Promoted; (R) Relegated

== See also ==
- 1959–60 Yugoslav First League
- 1959–60 Yugoslav Cup
