= FK Grafičar Podgorica =

- Full name: Fudbalski klub Grafičar Podgorica
- Nickname: Štampari ('Printing-workers')
- Founded: 1948
- Ground: Camp FSCG, Podgorica, Montenegro
- Capacity: 1,050
- Manager: Mladen Miročević
- League: Montenegrin Second League
- 2016-17: 12th

FK Grafičar is a Montenegrin football club based in Podgorica. The club was founded in 1948 and during the season 2016-17 was relegated from Montenegrin Second League.

== History ==
FK Grafičar was founded in 1948 in Nikšić, as a club of workers of state printing house Pobjeda. After few months, with removal of Pobjeda, the club relocated to Podgorica.

During the first decades of its existence, FK Grafičar, with seat at Stari Aerodrom quarter, participated in the Fourth League - Central. At that time, big local rivalry between FK Grafičar and FK Ribnica from neighbouring Konik settlement was born.

First significant success, FK Grafičar made at season 1970-71 by winning the Fourth League title and gained first-ever promotion to the Montenegrin Republic League.

During the next two decades, FK Grafičar played overall ten seasons in third-ranked Republic League, often with relegations to lowest Regional League. Best results in Montenegrin Republic League, FK Grafičar made during the seasons 1972-73 and 1974–75, finishing as a third-placed team. During the start of the nineties, contract with Pobjeda printing house was finished, so FK Grafičar became an independent club.

After Montenegrin independence, FK Grafičar became a member of Montenegrin Third League. In October 2007, FK Grafičar played in the first round of the Montenegrin Cup, against FK Budućnost (0:2), and it is the greatest match in the history of the club.

In 2007, FK Grafičar was very close to the Montenegrin Second League. The head coach of FK Grafičar was at the time Boris Maslenjak. That year Grafičar finished second in the Montenegrin Third League.

At 2007, old stadium of FK Grafičar at Stari Aerodrom is broken, so the club moved to Camp FSCG, on pitches shared with FK Mladost and FK Ribnica.

Historical success of FK Grafičar came at season 2014–15. After winning the Third League title, the club participated in the playoffs with FK Brskovo and FK Sloga Radovići and gained a promotion to the Montenegrin Second League.

FK Grafičar debuted in the Second League of the 2015-16 season, and finished seventh place, which was a big success for young team from Podgorica outskirts. A season later, because of financial crisis and technical problems, FK Grafičar were automatically relegated from the Second League after 11 weeks.

=== Seasons in Montenegrin Second League ===
For the first time, FK Grafičar played in the Montenegrin Second League on season 2015–16. A season later, the club was automatically relegated after 11 weeks, following technical problems and financial crisis.

Season	Place	M	W	D	L	GD	PTS
2015–16	7	30	10	4	16	37:41	34

=== Seasons in Montenegrin Republic League ===
Below is a score of FK Grafičar by every single season in Montenegrin Republic League.

Season	Place	M	W	D	L	GD	PTS
1971/72.	5	22	9	6	7	27:23	24
1972/73.	3	26	12	7	7	38:25	31
1973/74.	6	30	14	6	10	35:27	34
1974/75.	3	30	11	11	8	34:27	33
1975/76.	7	30	9	13	8	28:33	31
1976/77.	12	30	9	9	12	27:51	27
1977/78.	15	30	9	6	15	24:43	22
1986/87.	8	26	6	11	9	21:29	23
1987/88.	12	30	8	8	14	29:47	24
1988/89.	11	28	9	3	16	25:46	21

== Honours and achievements ==
- Montenegrin Third League – 1
  - winners (1): 2014–15
- Montenegrin Fourth League – 3
  - winners (3): 1970–71, 1985–86, 2003–04
- Central Region Cup – 1
  - winners (1): 2014

== Current squad ==
Note: Flags indicate national team as defined under FIFA eligibility rules; some limited exceptions apply. Players may hold more than one non-FIFA nationality.

No.	Pos.	Nation	Player
1	GK	MNE	Miloš Leković
3	DF	MNE	Milan Adžić
8	DF	MNE	Stefan Barjaktarović
45	MF	MNE	Filip Bešović
5	DF	MNE	Milić Popović
20	GK	MNE	Vladimir Marović
10	MF	MNE	Mihailo Kovačević
—	MF	MNE	Velizar Janketić
—	MF	MNE	Marko Sekulić

No.	Pos.	Nation	Player
12	MF	ITA	Giovanni Quartulli
14	DF	MNE	Nemanja Mirotic
--	MF	MNE	Miraš Mrdović
22	FW	MNE	Milutin Kalinić
16	MF	MNE	Nikola Rašović
13	DF	MNE	Balša Rogošić
7	MF	MNE	Tomislav Turanjanin
—	FW	MNE	Branislav Ceklic
—	DF	MNE	Vladimir Vratnica

== Stadium ==
FK Grafičar plays their home games at Camp FSCG. Previously, the team had their own stadium, but in 2007, after the expansion of the quarter buildings, the ground was demolished and the club moved to Camp FSCG.

== See also ==
- Camp FSCG
- Podgorica
- Montenegrin Second League
- Montenegrin clubs in Yugoslav football competitions (1946–2006)
