= FK Tekstilac =

Tekstilac Bijelo Polje
- Full name: Fudbalski klub Tekstilac Bijelo Polje
- Nickname(s): Tekstilci
- Founded: 1963
- Dissolved: 2014
- Ground: Gradski stadion (Bijelo Polje)
- Capacity: 4,000

Fudbalski klub Tekstilac Bijelo Polje was a Montenegrin football club based in Bijelo Polje. Their last official season was 2013–14, spent in the Montenegrin Third League.

== History ==
FK Tekstilac was founded in 1963, as a team of Textile industry from Bijelo Polje. At that time, they were second team from that northern Montenegrin team, beside much successful FK Jedinstvo.

Only year after foundation, FK Tekstilac gained promotion to the Montenegrin Republic League (Third rank). First significant success came in the 1973–74 season, when FK Tekstilac finished as fourth-placed team in the Republic League. In the 1979–80 season, the team finished as a runner-up, but without promotion to the Yugoslav Second League. During that time, FK Tekstilac became more successful team from Bijelo Polje, while the other local team FK Jedinstvo often played in the lowest-division.

Notable success of that era, FK Tekstilac made in the 1985–86 season. For the first and the only time in history, the team won the Montenegrin Republic Cup and qualified for the Yugoslav Cup season 1986–87. In the First Round of that competition, FK Tekstilac hosted prominent member of Yugoslav First League - Hajduk Split (0–7). The match was played on Gradski stadion in front of 8,000 spectators, which remains the biggest-ever attendance in the history of football in Bijelo Polje.
From 1990 to 2006, FK Tekstilac mostly played in the Fourth League - Northern region, with only few seasons in the Montenegrin Republic League.

Following Montenegrin independence, FK Tekstilac became a member of the Montenegrin Third League and won the title on inaugural season (2006–07). After the playoffs against FK Otrant and FK Iskra, FK Tekstilac made historical promotion to the Montenegrin Second League.

On their debut in Second League (season 2007-08), FK Tekstilac finished as a last-placed team, so they were relegated to the lowest-rank. During the season, they played three local-derbies against FK Jedinstvo (0–4, 0–2, 1–4).

From 2008 to 2014, FK Tekstilac played in the Third League, but without any significant success. At that time, as a winner or runner-up of the Northern Region Cup finals, FK Tekstilac played twice in the Montenegrin Cup. First time, in the 2012-13 season, they were eliminated in the First Round against elite-division side FK Sutjeska (0–6). Next season, they were defeated again in the First phase, against FK Mladost (0–2).

After the 2013–14 season, the club was dissolved due to financial difficulties.

=== Seasons in Montenegrin Second League ===
For the first and only time, FK Tekstilac played in the Montenegrin Second League in the 2007–08 season.

Season	Place	M	W	D	L	GD	PTS
2007–08	12	33	6	6	21	20:58	24

== Honours and achievements ==
- Montenegrin Third League – 1
  - winners (1): 2006–07
- Montenegrin Fourth League – 3
  - winners (4): 1972–73, 1982–83, 2002–03
- Montenegrin Republic Cup – 1
  - winners (1): 1985–86
- Northern Region Cup – 1
  - winners (1): 2013
  - runners-up (1): 2012

== Stadium ==
FK Tekstilac played their home games on Gradski stadion. There are two stands with overall capacity of 4,000 seats. At the north side of stadium is situated indoor sports hall 'Nikoljac'.

== See also ==
- Gradski stadion (Bijelo Polje)
- Bijelo Polje
- Montenegrin Third League
- Montenegrin clubs in Yugoslav football competitions (1946–2006)
