= FK Brskovo =

FK Brskovo Mojkovac
- Full name: Fudbalski klub Brskovo Mojkovac
- Founded: 1932
- Ground: Gradski stadion, Mojkovac, Montenegro
- Capacity: 1,500
- Chairman: Nikola Baltić
- Manager: Miloš Delević
- League: Montenegrin Third League
- 2025-26: 1st of 9

Fudbalski klub Brskovo (English: Football Club Brskovo Mojkovac) is a football club from Mojkovac, Montenegro. Founded in 1932, they currently compete in the Montenegrin Third League.

== History ==
FK Brskovo was founded at 1932, as a first football team in Mojkovac. At first decade (1932–1941), the team played mostly exhibition matches, with the popular regional rivalry with FK Gorštak.
First significant success after World War II, FK Brskovo made on season 1960–61, winning the title of the Fourth League (lowest-tier competition) champion. With that result, the team gained its first-ever promotion to the Montenegrin Republic League (third level). During the sixties, FK Brskovo spent most of their seasons in the Republic League, but without significant successes.
Almost two next decades, FK Brskovo played only in the lowest rank, until the 1988–89 season. During that year, they won the champion title in the Fourth League – North, and made an comeback to the Republic League. From 1990 to 2006, FK Brskovo spent most of their seasons in the Fourth League.
Following Montenegrin independence (2006), FK Brskovo became a member of the Montenegrin Third League. They won the competition on season 2014–15, gaining first-ever promotion to the Montenegrin Second League. Until today, it remains most successful result in the history of FK Brskovo.
On their debut season in Second League, FK Brskovo had a hard struggle with FK Jezero and FK Igalo, but at the end they were relegated.
From 2011 to 2016, FK Brskovo played three finals of the Northern Region Cup, winning two titles. It gave them an opportunity to play few seasons in the Montenegrin Cup. In that competition, FK Brskovo played three times in the Round of 16, with notable games against First-League sides OFK Petrovac (0–2, 0–0; 2011–12), FK Zeta (2–1, 0–3; 2015–16) and FK Lovćen (2–4, 0–1; 2016–17).

=== Seasons in Montenegrin Second League ===
For the first and only time, FK Brskovo played in the Montenegrin Second League in the 2015–16 season.

Season	Place	M	W	D	L	GD	PTS
2015–16	11	30	5	14	11	23:35	29

=== Talent producing ===
During the past, FK Brskovo produced many football talents. Most known players which started their careers in FK Brskovo youth team are Stefan Savić, Dragan Bogavac and Miodrag Božović.

== Honours and achievements ==
- Montenegrin Third League – 1
  - winners (1): 2014–15
- Montenegrin Fourth League – 4
  - winners (4): 1988–89, 1991–92, 2001–02, 2003–04
- Northern Region Cup – 2
  - winners (2): 2011, 2016

== Current squad ==
Note: Flags indicate national team as defined under FIFA eligibility rules; some limited exceptions apply. Players may hold more than one non-FIFA nationality.

No.	Pos.	Nation	Player
--	GK	MNE	Aleksa Bulatovic
--	DF	MNE	Radovan Radonjic
--	DF	MNE	Milic Djukic
3	DF	MNE	Rados Grdinic
--	MF	MNE	Nemanja Radevic
--	MF	MNE	Balsa Masanovic
2	DF	SRB	Milan Damjanovic

No.	Pos.	Nation	Player
--	MF	MNE	Vuk Pandurica
12	MF	MNE	Aleksa Vlahovic
30	MF	MNE	Stefan Vlaovic
33	MF	MNE	Bojan Vlaovic (captain)
--	MF	MNE	Lazar Grandov
10	MF	MNE	Igor Radevic
17	FW	MNE	Vuk Dapcevic

== Stadium ==
FK Brskovo plays their home games at Gradski stadion, on Tara riverbank. The stadium was renovated in 2009. There is one stand with capacity of 1,500 seats and additional field for trainings and youth-league games.

== See also ==
- Gradski stadion (Mojkovac)
- Mojkovac
- Montenegrin Third League
- Football in Montenegro
- Montenegrin clubs in Yugoslav football competitions (1946–2006)
