= FK Zora =

Zora
- Full name: Fudbalski klub Zora
- Founded: 1922
- Ground: Spuž City Stadium
- Capacity: 1,700
- Chairman: Jelena Bošković
- Manager: Jelena Bošković
- League: Montenegrin Third League
- 2024–25: (withdrew)

Fudbalski klub Zora is a football club based in Spuž, Montenegro, which competes in the Montenegrin Third League.

== History ==
Founded in 1922, FK Zora played only non-league matches before World War II. First seasons in official competitions, the team played during the middle of fifties (since 1954–55 season), as a member of lowest-rank, then known under the name Titogradski fudbalski podsavez.

First success, the team made at 1966, under the name FK Spuž. After qualifiers, they gained first-ever promotion to the Montenegrin Republic League 1966-67 (third rank). After five consecutive seasons in the Republic League, FK Spuž was relegated to the Fourth League - Central region, but new comeback to the third-tier was made in the 1975–76 season. Always at the lower part of the table, FK Spuž played another three consecutive seasons in the Republic League, before the new relegation.
During the 1980s, FK Spuž played only at bottom-league. New performance in the Third League came in 1990, but only for two seasons. In 1994, the team has regained its original name - FK Zora.

The greatest period in FK Zora history came with the new century. During the 2002–03 season, after hard struggle with OFK Grbalj, FK Zora finished as a runner-up of the Montenegrin Republic League. Two years later, FK Zora dominated in the Montenegrin Republic League and won the champion title with 69 points from 33 games. With that result, the team from Spuž gained historical promotion to the 2005-06 Serbia and Montenegro Second League.

Following Montenegrin independence, FK Zora became a member of the Montenegrin Second League inaugural season, but they were relegated at the end of season. FK Zora was the champion of the Montenegrin Third League 2008–09, but lost promotion in the Second League playoffs against OFK Bar and FK Gusinje. In the 2011–12 season, the team again won the Third League title. In the Second League 2012–13 season, FK Zora won ninth place, but notable result came in the 2013-14 season. Until the last weeks of championship, FK Zora was among the candidates for the Montenegrin First League playoffs, but at the end they won fourth place in the table. In summer 2014, FK Zora was in financial troubles, so the team relegated to the bottom-league.

Today, FK Zora is a member of the Montenegrin Third League - Central Region.

== Honours and achievements ==
- Montenegrin Republic League – 1
  - winners (1): 2004–05
  - runner-up (1): 2002–03
- Montenegrin Third League – 2
  - winners (2): 2008–09, 2011–12
- Montenegrin Fourth League – 3
  - winners (3): 1974–75, 1989–90, 1993–94
- Central Region Cup – 1
  - winners (1): 2008

== Stadium ==
FK Zora plays their home games at Spuž City Stadium, near the railway station. Stadium is built during the sixties, and after last renovation (2004) have a capacity of 1,700 seats.
