= FK Gorštak =

FK Gorštak Kolašin
- Full name: Fudbalski klub Gorštak Kolašin
- Founded: 1927
- Ground: Stadion u Lugu, Kolašin, Montenegro
- Capacity: 1,968 (planned)
- Chairman: Đuro Milošević
Home colours	Away colours

Fudbalski klub Gorštak (English: Football Club Gorštak Kolašin) is a football club from Kolašin, Montenegro. Founded in 1927, they have competed in the Montenegrin Third League.

== History ==
FK Gorštak was founded in 1927, as a first football team from Kolašin. During the next decade, the team played in the Montenegrin Football Championship, but without any significant success.
Most known game in Kolašin from that time was against notable Montenegrin side FK Budućnost (1–7), which was attended by 1,000 spectators.
After World War II, FK Gorštak played qualifiers for the Montenegrin Republic League. First biggest success came in 1969-70 when FK Gorštak won the title of the Fourth League - Central Region champion and gained its first-ever promotion to the Montenegrin Republic League. During the rest of the 20th century, the team from Kolašin spent most of their seasons in the lowest rank, with two another promotions to the Republic League (seasons 1984–85 and 1990–91). During the nineties, the team spent few seasons in the Montenegrin Republic League and that was the decade of team's biggest results in history. After the financial difficulties, FK Gorštak was relegated from Republic League in the 1999–2000 season, which was their last year in that competition.

Following Montenegrin independence (2006), FK Gorštak became a member of the lowest-tier (Montenegrin Third League). Since then, the team is a permanent member of competition, without significant attempt or ambitions to gain promotion to the Second League due to financial troubles.

In seasons 2011–12 and 2015–16, FK Gorštak played in the finals of the Central Region Cup, but were defeated both times. With that result, the team from Kolašin qualified for the Montenegrin Cup. First time in the 2012-13 season, they surprisingly won the First round game against OFK Bar (1-0), but were eliminated in the Round of 16, against First League member OFK Grbalj (0-2; 0-3). Next time, in the First round of the 2016–17 Montenegrin Cup, FK Gorštak was eliminated by neighbour-side FK Brskovo after penalties (2-4).

== Honours and achievements ==
- Montenegrin Fourth League – 3
  - winners (3): 1969–70, 1984–85, 1990–91
- Central Region Cup – 0
  - runners-up (2): 2012, 2016

== Stadium ==
FK Gorštak plays their home games at Stadion u Lugu, on Tara riverbank. The stadium was built during the sixties. In 2016, FK Gorštak presented stadium renovation project, with planned capacity of 1,968 seats.

There is another stadium near main field - ground of 'Bianca' Hotel, with two stands and capacity of 1,000 seats. In 2013, Football Association of Montenegro built an additional field with articificial turf, so there are three grounds on Kolašin football complex today.
Except FK Gorštak games, during the summer months, because of good climate and accommodation, the stadium is used for exhibition matches, tournaments, trainings and preparations of many football teams from the region (Montenegro, Serbia and Albania).

== Other sports ==
Except football, Sport Club Gorštak is active in the other sports, too. Part of Society are basketball, volleyball and table-tennis teams.
Their basketball club (KK Gorštak) produced one of the greatest Montenegrin players - Vlado Šćepanović, who was born in Kolašin.

== See also ==
- Kolašin
- Montenegrin Third League
- Football in Montenegro
- Montenegrin clubs in Yugoslav football competitions (1946–2006)
