= Montenegrin Football Championship (1922–1940) =

- Founded
- 1922
- Dissolved
- 1940
- Nation
- Kingdom of Yugoslavia
- Number of Seasons
- 16
- Level on Pyramid
- Level 2 / Level 3
- Last Champions 1939–40
- Balšić Podgorica

The Montenegrin Football Championship was a football league competition that existed in the Kingdom of Yugoslavia from 1925 until 1940, under the names Prvijenstvo Zetske i Primorske banovine (1922-1930) and Prvijenstvo Cetinjskog loptačkog podsaveza (1930-1940).

From 1922 to 1930, the championship was the third level of football in the Kingdom of Yugoslavia. In period 1930-1940, Montenegrin Football Championship, under the Cetinjski loptački podsavez (Cetinje Football Association) was the second-tier league competition in the Kingdom of Yugoslavia.

== Champions ==
=== Champions by seasons ===
==== Championship of Zeta Banovina and Littoral Banovina (1922–1930) ====
In period 1922-1930, Championship of Zeta Banovina and Littoral Banovina (Prvijenstvo Zetske i Primorske banovine) was the third-tier competition in the Kingdom of Yugoslavia. It was organised by Splitski nogometni podsavez (regional association with the seat in Split). During every year, two seasons were played (spring and autumn).

Season	Winner	Finalist	Result
1922	SK Crnogorac Cetinje	FK Lovćen Cetinje	3–0
1923	SK Crnogorac Cetinje	FK Bokelj Kotor	5–1
1924	SK Crnogorac Cetinje	FK Bokelj Kotor	3–0
Spring 1925	FK Lovćen Cetinje	FK Bokelj Kotor	2–1
Autumn 1925	FK Lovćen Cetinje	GSK Balšić Podgorica	3–0
1926	GSK Balšić Podgorica	SK Crnogorac Cetinje	2–1
Spring 1927	FK Lovćen Cetinje	GSK Balšić Podgorica	?
Autumn 1927	GSK Balšić Podgorica	SK Crnogorac Cetinje	2–1
Spring 1928	SK Crnogorac Cetinje	FK Bokelj Kotor	4–3; 0–0
Autumn 1928	FK Lovćen Cetinje	FK Berane	3–0
Spring 1929	GSK Balšić Podgorica	FK Arsenal Tivat	2–0
Autumn 1929	SK Crnogorac Cetinje	FK Sutjeska Nikšić	2–1
Spring 1930	GSK Balšić Podgorica	FK Arsenal Tivat	3–0
Autumn 1930	GSK Balšić Podgorica	FK Arsenal Tivat	1–0

==== Championship of the Cetinje Football Subassociation (1930–1940) ====
In period 1930-1940, Championship of the Cetinje Football Subassociation (Prvijenstvo Cetinjskog loptačkog podsaveza) was the second-tier competition in the Kingdom of Yugoslavia. It was organised by Cetinjski loptački podsavez (regional association with the seat in Cetinje).

Season	Winner	Finalist	Result
Spring 1931	SK Crnogorac Cetinje	SK Obilić Nikšić	2–1
Autumn 1931	SK Crnogorac Cetinje	FK Budućnost Podgorica	2–1
Spring 1932	SK Crnogorac Cetinje	SK Obilić Nikšić	8–3
Autumn 1932	FK Budućnost Podgorica	FK Lovćen Cetinje	6–3
Spring 1933	FK Budućnost Podgorica	FK Lovćen Cetinje	2–0; 2–2
Autumn 1933	FK Budućnost Podgorica	FK Lovćen Cetinje	1–0; 1–1
1934	FK Budućnost Podgorica	FK Lovćen Cetinje	2–0; 1–1
1935	FK Lovćen Cetinje	FK Budućnost Podgorica	2–1
1936	SK Crnogorac Cetinje	Unknown	
1937	FK Arsenal Tivat	Unknown	
1938	SK Crnogorac Cetinje	Unknown	
1939	GSK Balšić Podgorica	Unknown	
1940	GSK Balšić Podgorica	Unknown	

=== Titles by team ===
Team	City	Titles	Winning seasons
Crnogorac	Cetinje	10	1922, 1923, 1924, Spring 1928, Autumn 1929, Spring 1931, Autumn 1931, Spring 1932, 1936, 1938
Balšić	Podgorica	7	1926, Autumn 1927, Spring 1929, Spring 1930, Autumn 1930, 1939, 1940
Lovćen	Cetinje	5	Spring 1925, Autumn 1925, Spring 1927, Autumn 1928, 1935
Budućnost	Podgorica	4	Autumn 1932, Spring 1933, Autumn 1933, 1934
Arsenal	Tivat	1	1937

== See also ==
- Montenegrin clubs in Yugoslav football competitions (1946-2006)
- Football in Montenegro
- Montenegrin First League
