= Podgorica =

Capital and largest city of Montenegro

Podgorica Подгорица
- Capital city and municipality
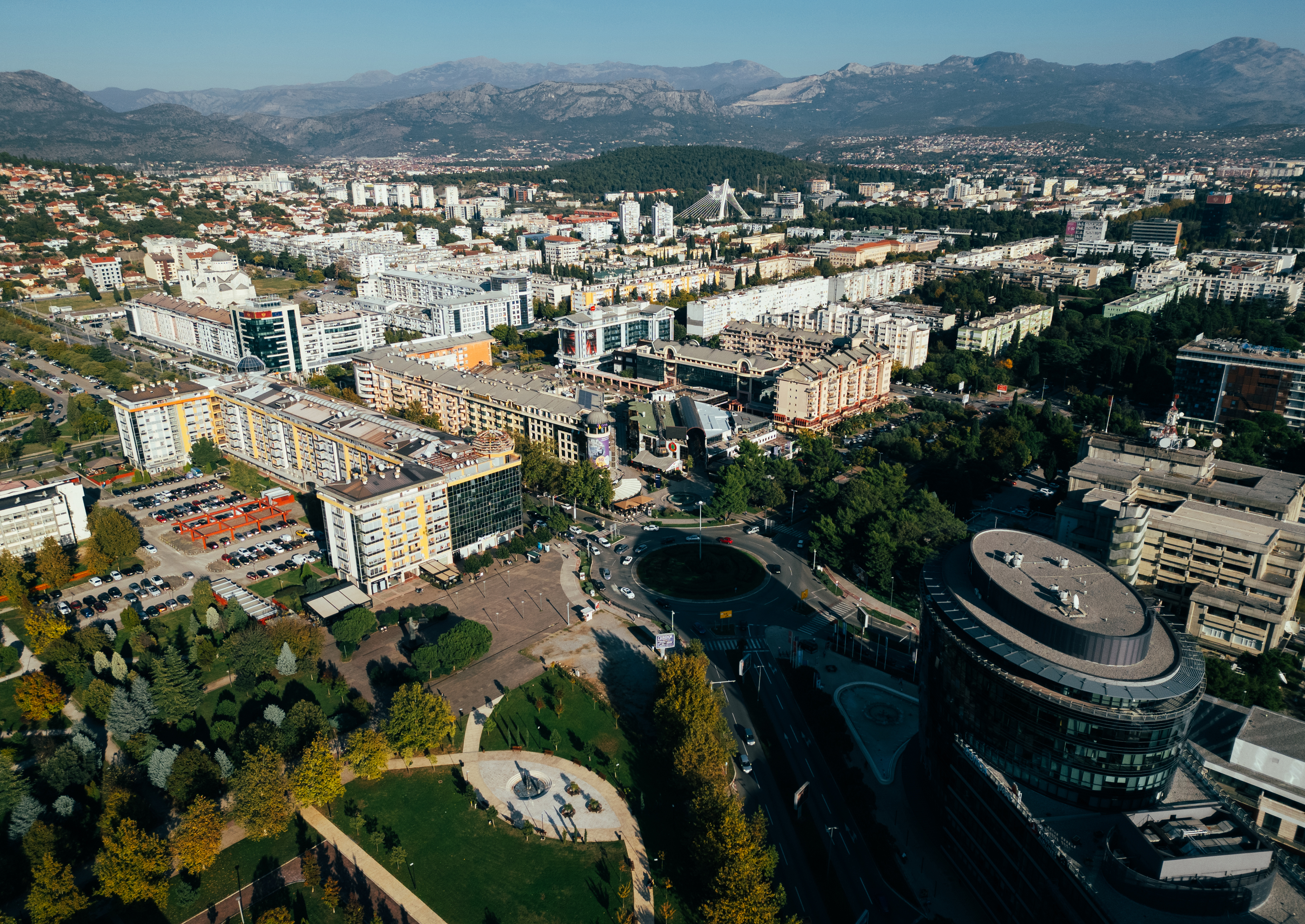
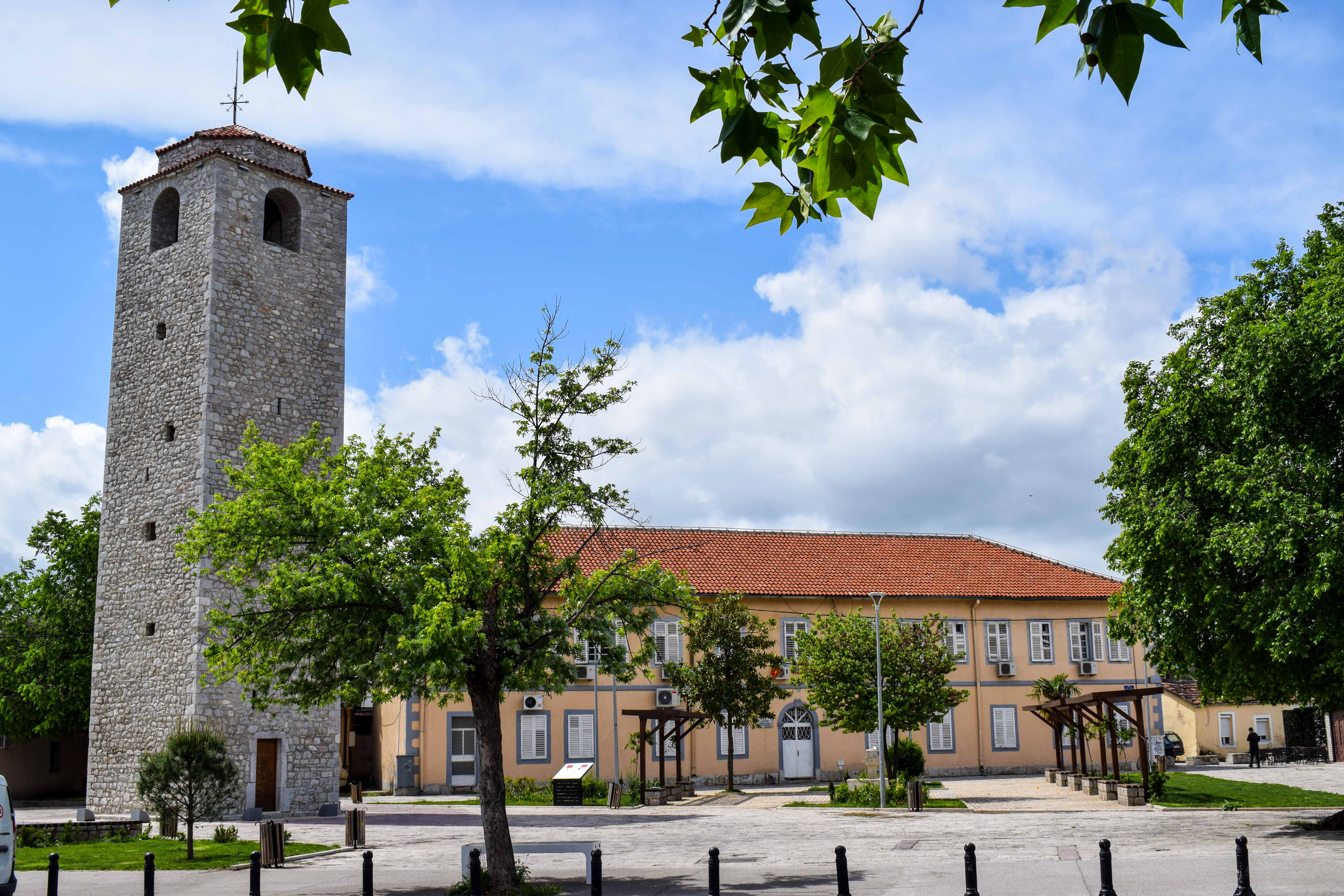
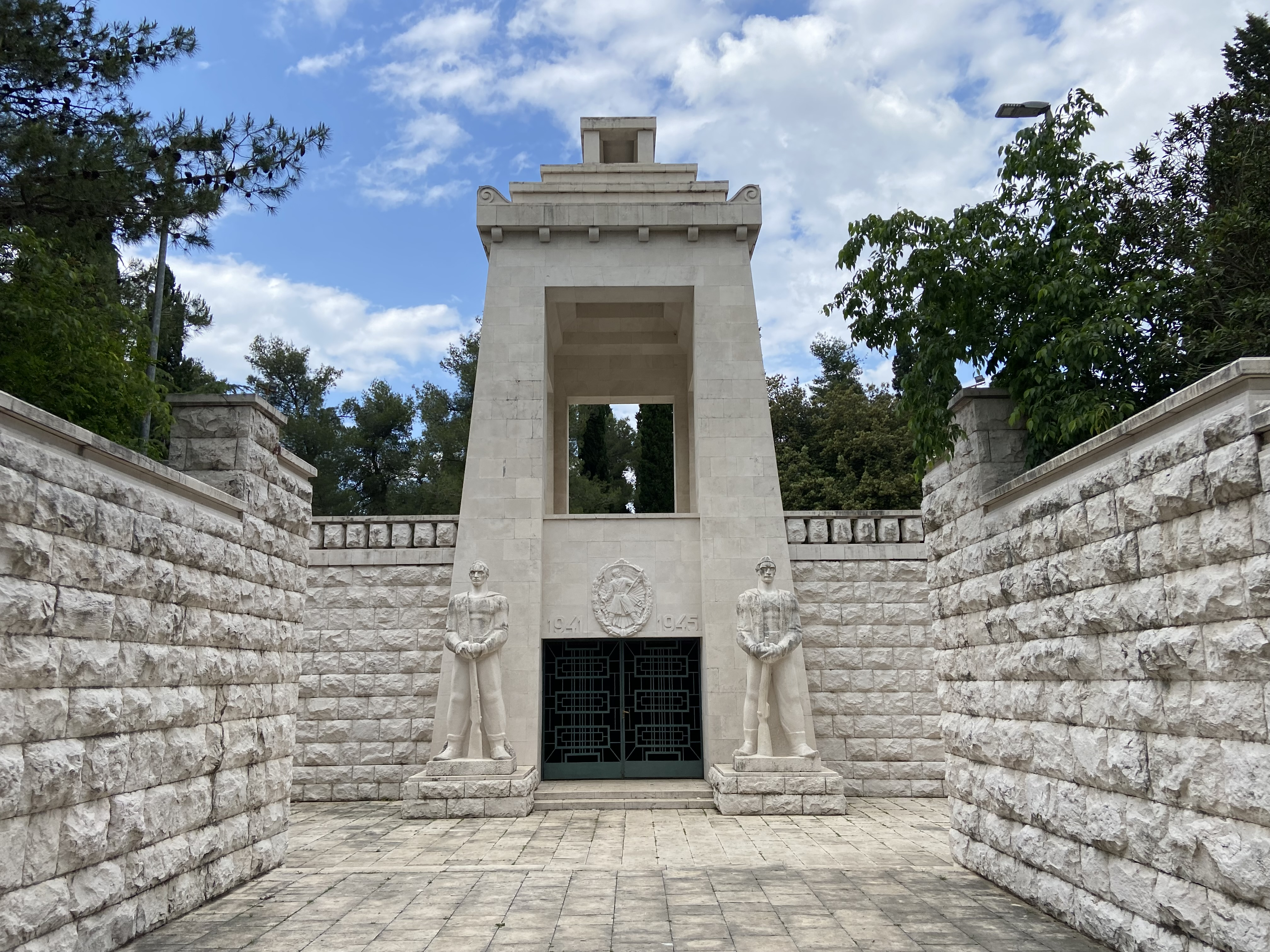
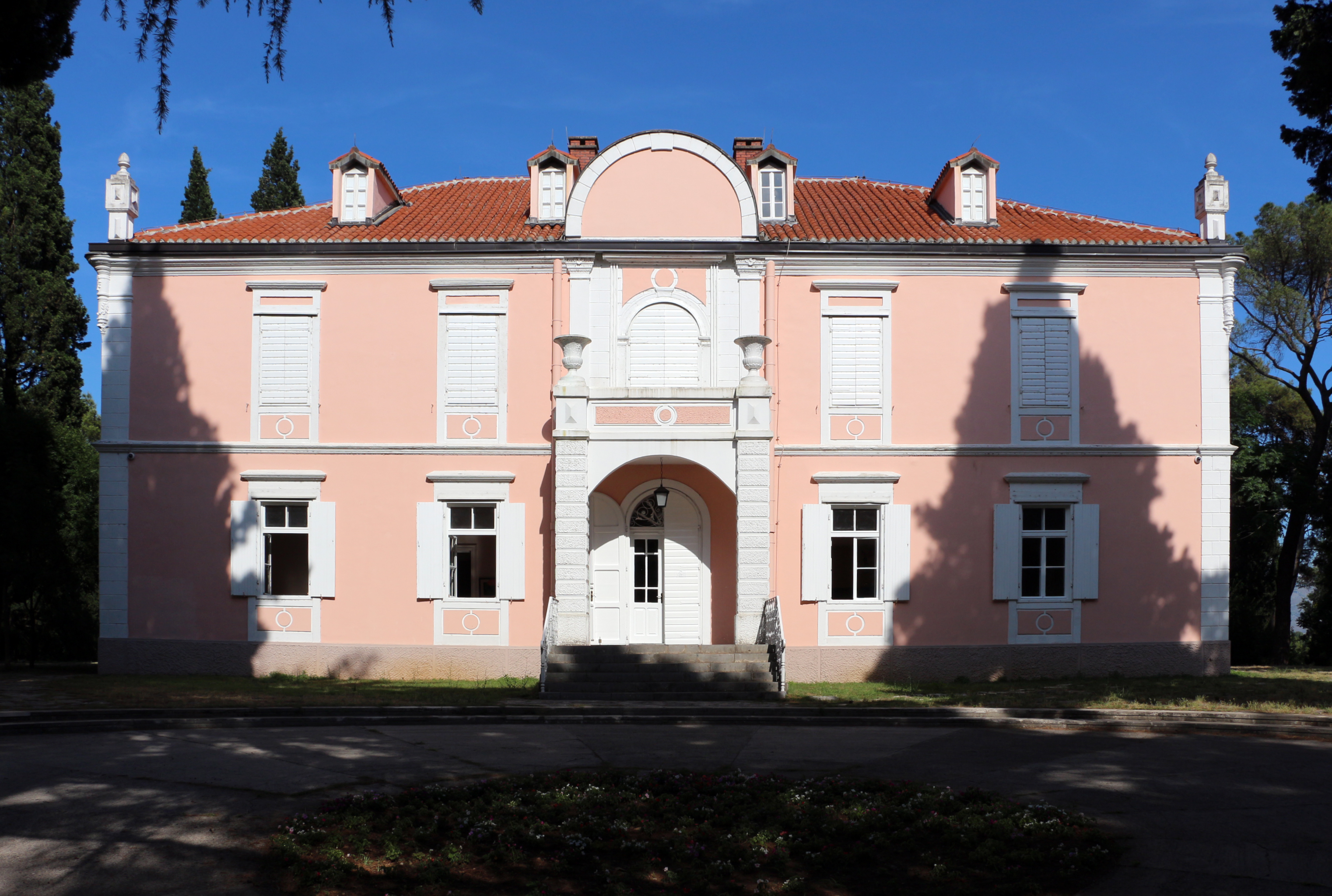
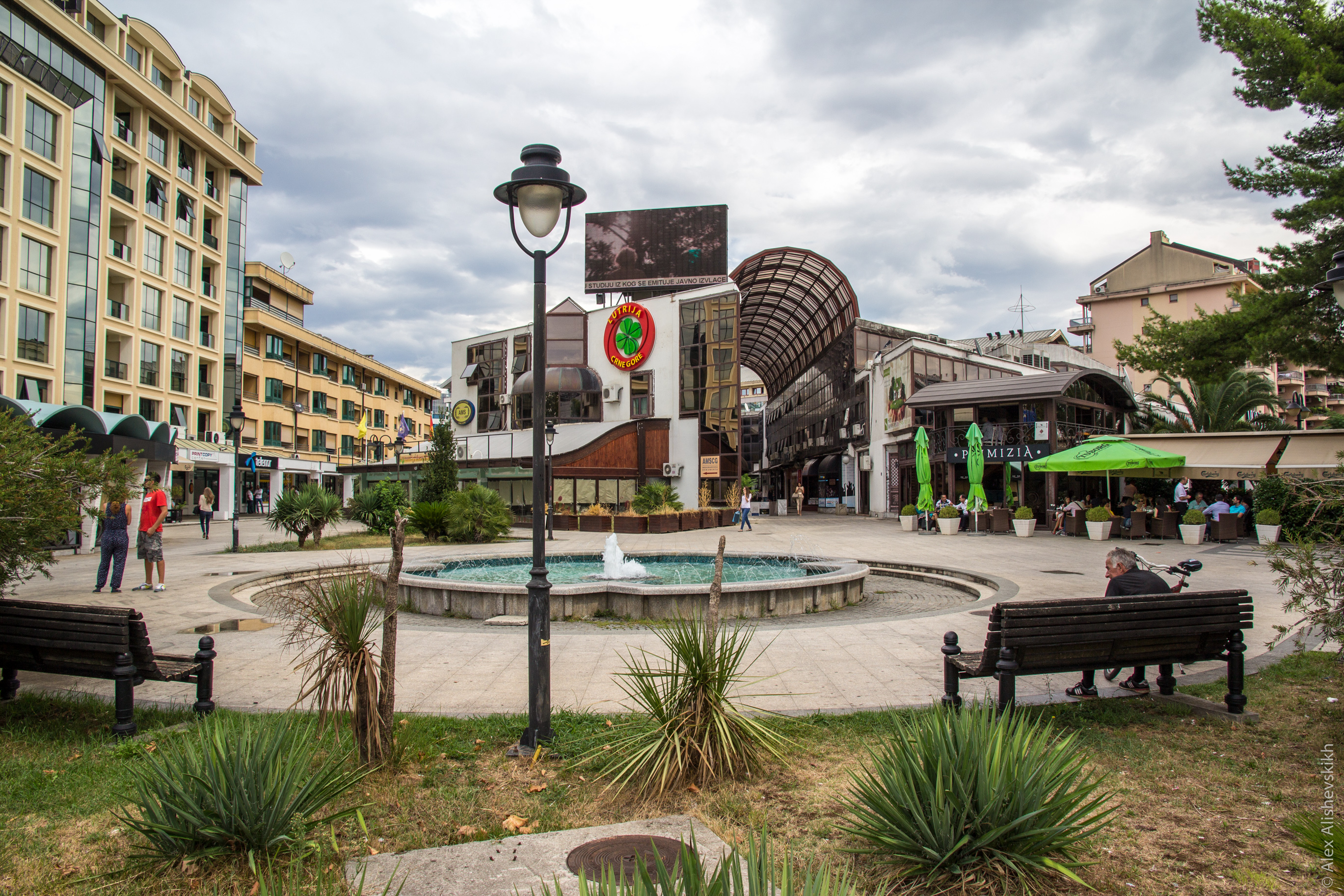
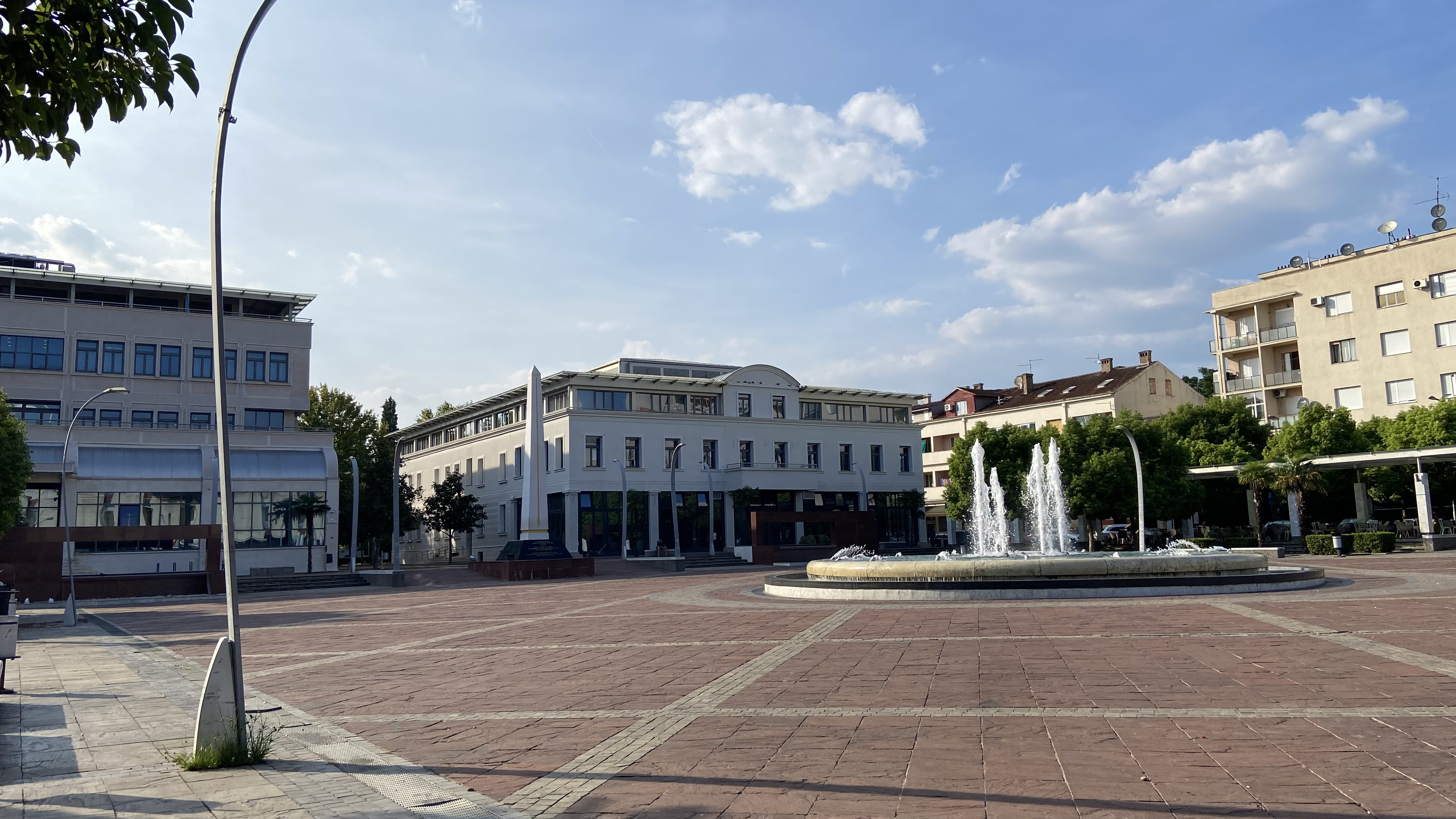
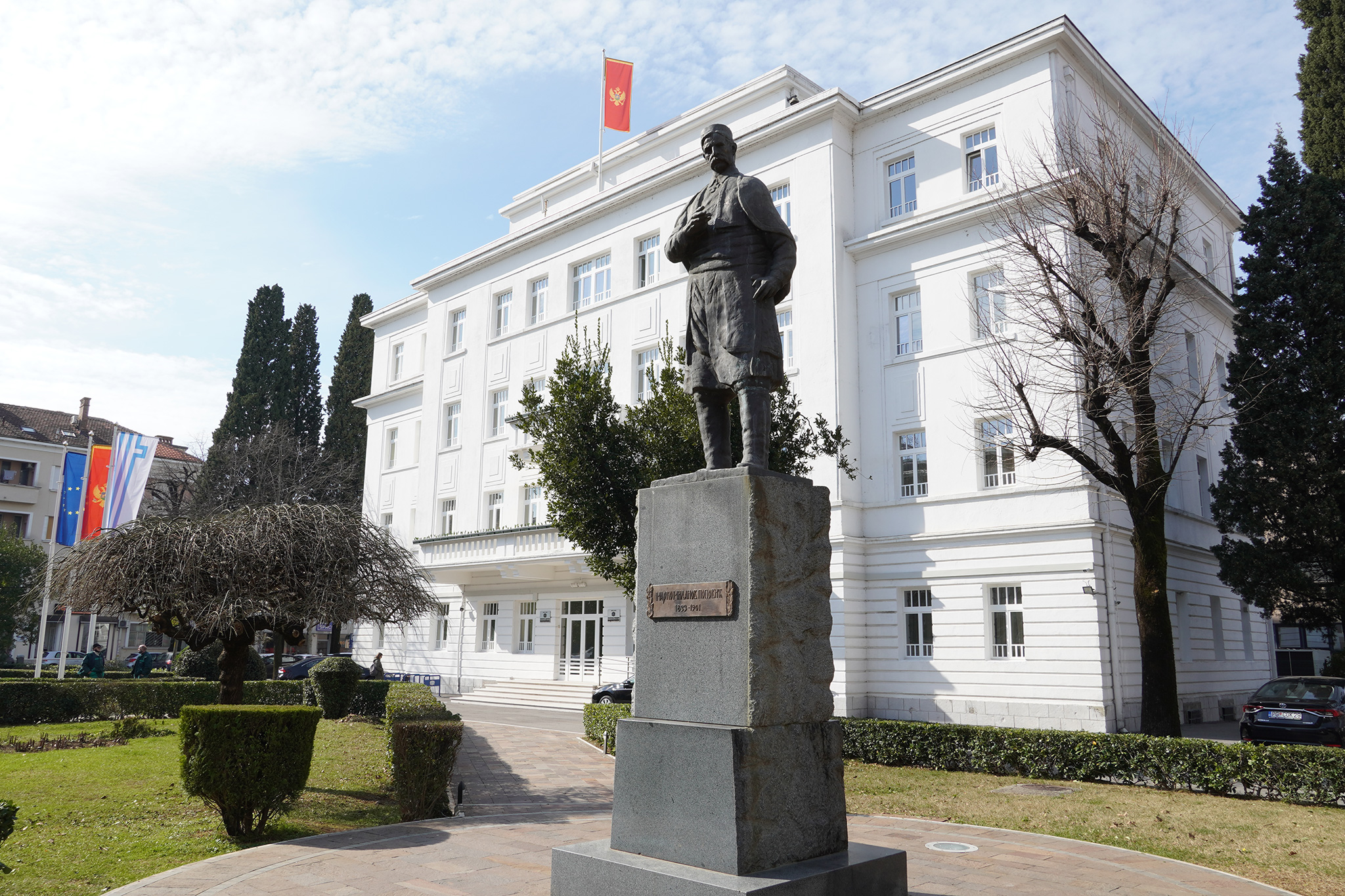
- Panoramic view of Podgorica Millennium Bridge Cathedral of the Resurrection of Christ Clock Tower Partisans Monument Petrović-Njegoš dynasty Royal Estate Business Center Kruševac Independence Square Municipal Building

- Flag Coat of arms
- Interactive map of Podgorica
- Location within Montenegro Location within Europe
- Coordinates: 42°26′29″N 19°15′46″E
- Country: Montenegro
- Region: Central
- Municipality: Podgorica
- Established by Romans: AD 426; 1600 years ago, as Birziminium

Government
  - Type: Mayor-Assembly
  - Body: City Assembly
  - Mayor: Saša Mujović (PES!)

Area
  - Capital city and municipality: 108 km^{2} (42 sq mi)
  - Metro: 1,441 km^{2} (556 sq mi)
- Elevation: 40 m (130 ft)

Population (2023)
  - Rank: 1st in Montenegro
  - Urban: ▲172,139
  - Rural: ▲7,366
  - Metro: ▲179,505
- Demonym(s): Podgorician, Podgoricians (plu.)
- Time zone: UTC+01:00 (CET)
  - Summer (DST): UTC+02:00 (CEST)
- Postal code: 81 000 – 81 124
- Area code: +382 20
- Vehicle registration: PG
- Patron saint: Saint Mark
- Climate: Csa, Cfa
- Website: podgorica.me

Podgorica (Note: See #Etymology below) is the capital and largest city of Montenegro. The city is located in central Montenegro, at the confluence of Ribnica and Morača rivers, where the southern foothills of Dinaric Alps meet the northernmost part of Zeta Plain.

Following the Allied victory in World War II, Podgorica was renamed Titograd in 1946, and simultaneously designated as capital of Socialist Republic of Montenegro. This marked the beginning of rapid growth of Podgorica, transforming a small town into a primate city of Montenegro, a home for nearly a third of the country's population. The city's original name was restored in 1992, and it became a capital of independent Montenegro in 2006.

During the Yugoslav era, Podgorica's economy developed around heavy industries and manufacturing, which have since given way to a service based economy. Owing to its central location within the country, Podgorica is a hub of Montenegro's rail and road network, while Podgorica Airport is the country's main gateway for international air travel. Podgorica is the center of Montenegro education, science and healthcare.

While Podgorica is home to the National Theatre of Montenegro and various other cultural institutions, significant national cultural and historic heritage is still preserved in Cetinje, which served as capital and seat of the throne for much of Montenegrin history.

== Etymology ==
- Podgorica, English pronunciation: /ˈpɒdɡəriːtsə/ POD-gə-reet-sə, Montenegrin pronunciation: [pǒdɡorit͡sa], in local dialect [podˈɡorit͡sa] (older variant) and [ˈpodɡorit͡sa] (newer); written identically in Bosnian, Croatian and Serbian; Albanian: Podgoricë (Albanian definite form: Podgorica); ([pɔdɡɔɾit͡sa]; Montenegrin Cyrillic: Подгорица; (Note: Written identically in Serbian Cyrillic.) lit. 'Under the Hill'

Podgorica is written in Cyrillic as Подгорица, pronounced [pǒdɡorit͡sa]; UK: /ˈpɒdɡɒrɪtsə, pɒdˈɡɔːr-/, US: /ˈpɒdɡəriːtsə, ˈpɔːdɡɒr-/; Podgorica literally means 'under the hill'. Gorica (Горица), a diminutive of the word gora (гора) which is another word for 'mountain' or 'hill', means 'little/small hill', is the name of one of the cypress-covered hillocks that overlooks the city center. Some three kilometres (1.9 miles) north of Podgorica lie the ruins of the Roman-era town of Doclea, from which the Roman Emperor Diocletian's mother hailed. In later centuries, Romans corrected the name to Dioclea, guessing that an i had been lost in vulgar speech. Duklja is the later South Slavic version of the same word. At its foundation in 426 AD, the town was called Birziminium. In the Middle Ages, it was known as Ribnica (Рибница, [rîbnit͡sa]). The name Podgorica was used from 1326. From 1946 to 1992, the city was named Titograd (Титоград, [tîtograːd]) in honour of Josip Broz Tito, the president of Socialist Federal Republic of Yugoslavia from 1953 to 1980. In 1992 the city changed its name to "Podgorica", which it remains today.

== History ==
Historical affiliations

- Illyria (9th century BCE – 33 BCE)
- Roman Republic (33 BCE – 27 BCE)
- Roman Empire (27 BCE – 476)
- Byzantine Empire (476 – 997)
- First Bulgarian Empire (997 – 1018)
- Byzantine Empire (1018 – 1040)
- Doclea (1040 – 1186)
- Grand Principality of Serbia (1186 – 1217)
- Kingdom of Serbia (1217 – 1346)
- Serbian Empire (1346 – 1371)
- Zeta under the Balšići (1371 – 1421)
- Serbian Despotate (1421 – 1441)
- Kingdom of Bosnia (1441 – 1444)
- Republic of Venice (1444 – 1448)
- Serbian Despotate (1448 – 1452)
- Republic of Venice (1452 – 1474)
- Ottoman Empire (1474 – 1757)
- Bushati Pashalik, (de facto independent) (1757 – 1831)
- Ottoman Empire (1831 – 1878)
- Principality of Montenegro (1878 – 1910)
- Kingdom of Montenegro (1910 – 1916)
- Austria-Hungary (1916 – 1918)
- Kingdom of Yugoslavia (1918 – 1941)
- Kingdom of Italy (1941 – 1943)
- Greater German Reich (1943 – 1944)
- SFR Yugoslavia (SR Montenegro) (1944 – 1992)
- FR Yugoslavia ( Republic of Montenegro) (1992 – 2006)
- Montenegro (2006 – present; capital)

=== Early history ===
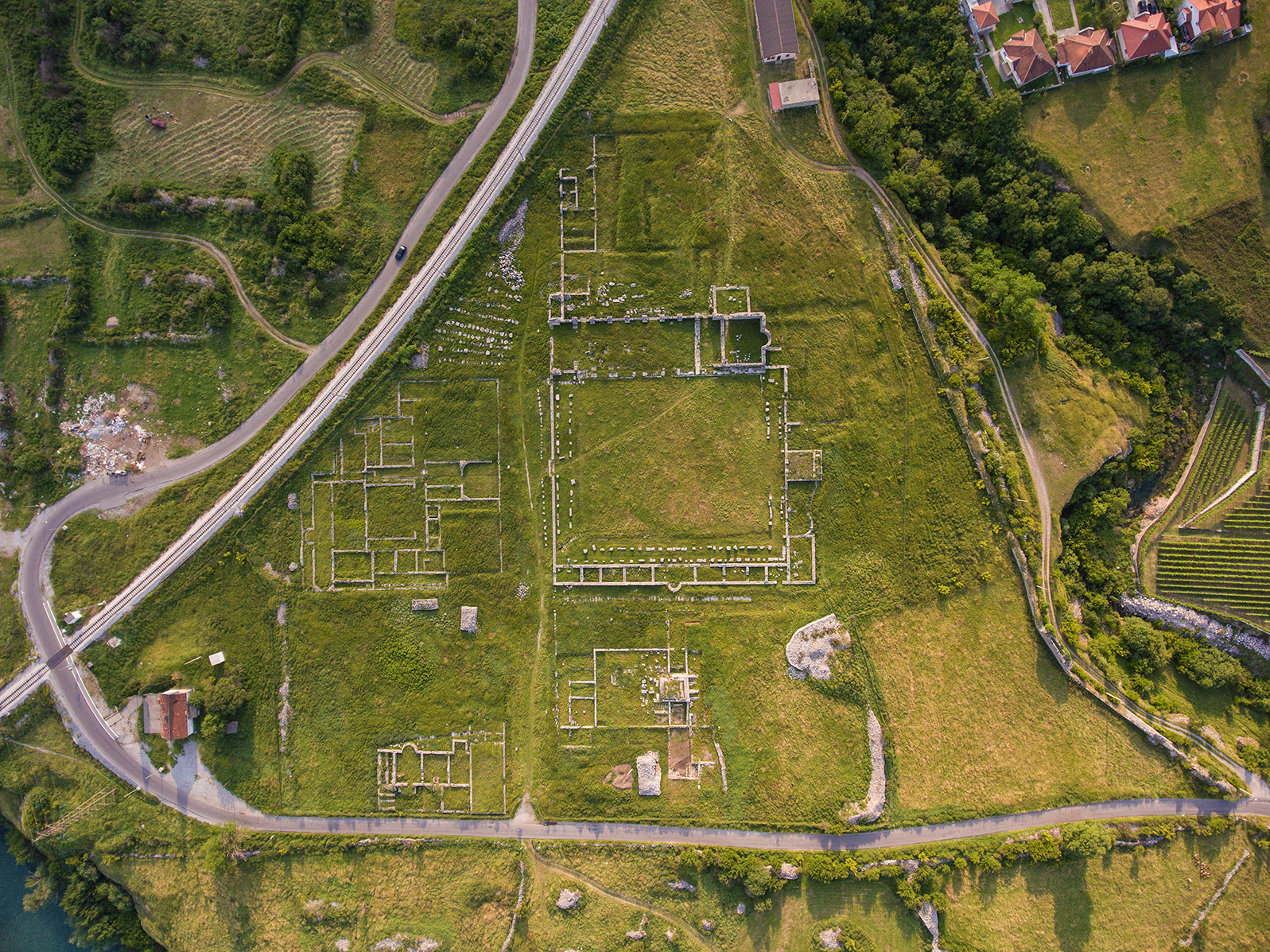
Doclea, Roman town, the seat of the Late Roman province of Praevalitana

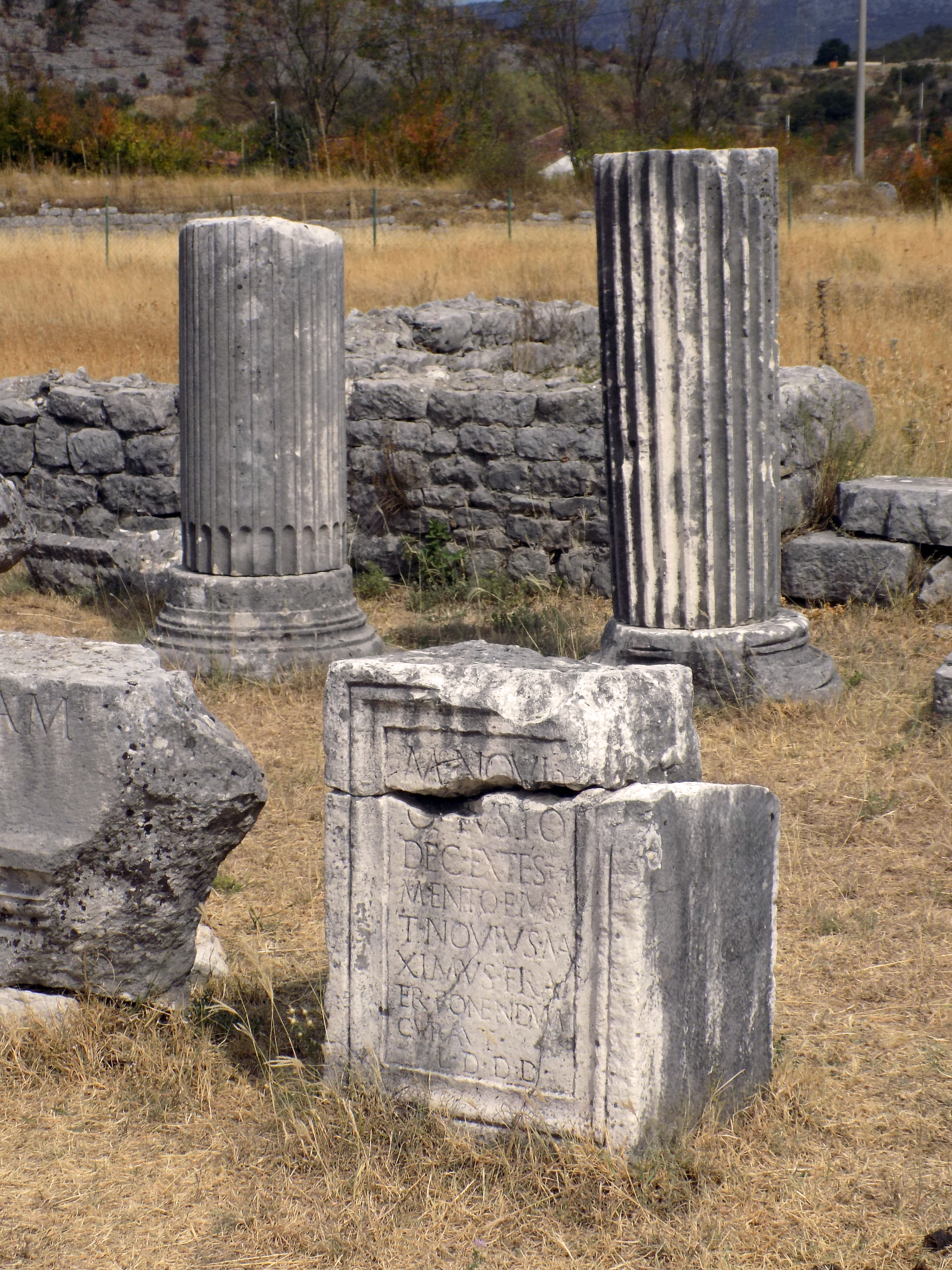
Archeological remains of the Roman period in Doclea

Podgorica is at the crossroads of several historically important routes, near the rivers Zeta, Morača, Cijevna, Ribnica, Sitnica and Mareza in the valley of Lake Skadar and near the Adriatic Sea, in fertile lowlands with favourable climate. The earliest human settlements were in prehistory: the oldest physical remains are from the late Stone Age.

In the Iron Age, the area between the Zeta and Bjelopavlići valleys was populated by two Illyrian tribes, the Labeates and the Docleatae. The population of the town of Doclea was 8,000–10,000, in which all core urban issues were resolved. The high population density (in an area of about 10 km (6 mi) radius) was made possible by the geographical position, favorable climate, and economic conditions and by the defensive positions that were of great importance at that time.

The name Podgorica was first mentioned in 1326 in a court document of the Kotor archives. The city was economically strong: trade routes between the Republic of Ragusa and Serbia, well developed at that time, were maintained via the road that led to Podgorica through Trebinje and Nikšić. As a busy crossroads, Podgorica was a vibrant regional center of trade and communication. This boosted its development, economic power, military strength, and strategic importance.

In 1448, Stefan Crnojević allied himself with the Republic of Venice, and after defeating the despot Đurađ Branković in 1452, he handed over Podgorica to the Venetian Republic, which already held the Shkodër region. However, Venetian rule of Podgorica did not last long, because Mehmed II soon conquered the fortified town of Medun in 1455, and two years later, most of Zeta.

=== Ottoman Empire ===
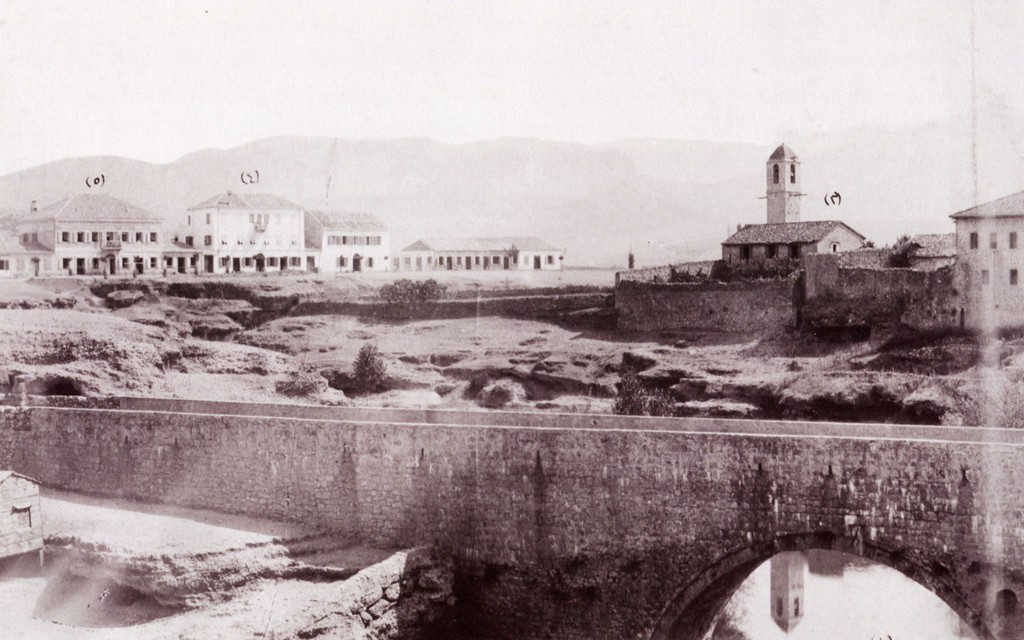
View of Ribnica fortress and Old bridge, Catholic Church (right), Debbaglar Bridge, government mansion and the Mirko Varosh Hotel (far left), before 1901

The Ottoman Empire captured Podgorica in 1474. Podgorica became a kaza of the Sanjak of Scutari (which was historically led by Albanian Pashas). In 1479, The Ottomans built a large fortress in Podgorica, and the existing settlement, with its highly developed merchant connections, became the main Ottoman defensive and attacking bastion in the region. At the beginning of 1474, the Ottoman sultan intended to rebuild Podgorica and Baleč and settle 5,000 Muslim families there (most of them of Albanian or Slavic origin), in order to stop cooperation between the Principality of Zeta and Albania Veneta.

Podgorica fell again, but this time to the Ottomans in 1484, and the character of the town changed extensively. The Ottomans fortified the city, building towers, gates, and defensive ramparts that give Podgorica the appearance of an Ottoman military city.

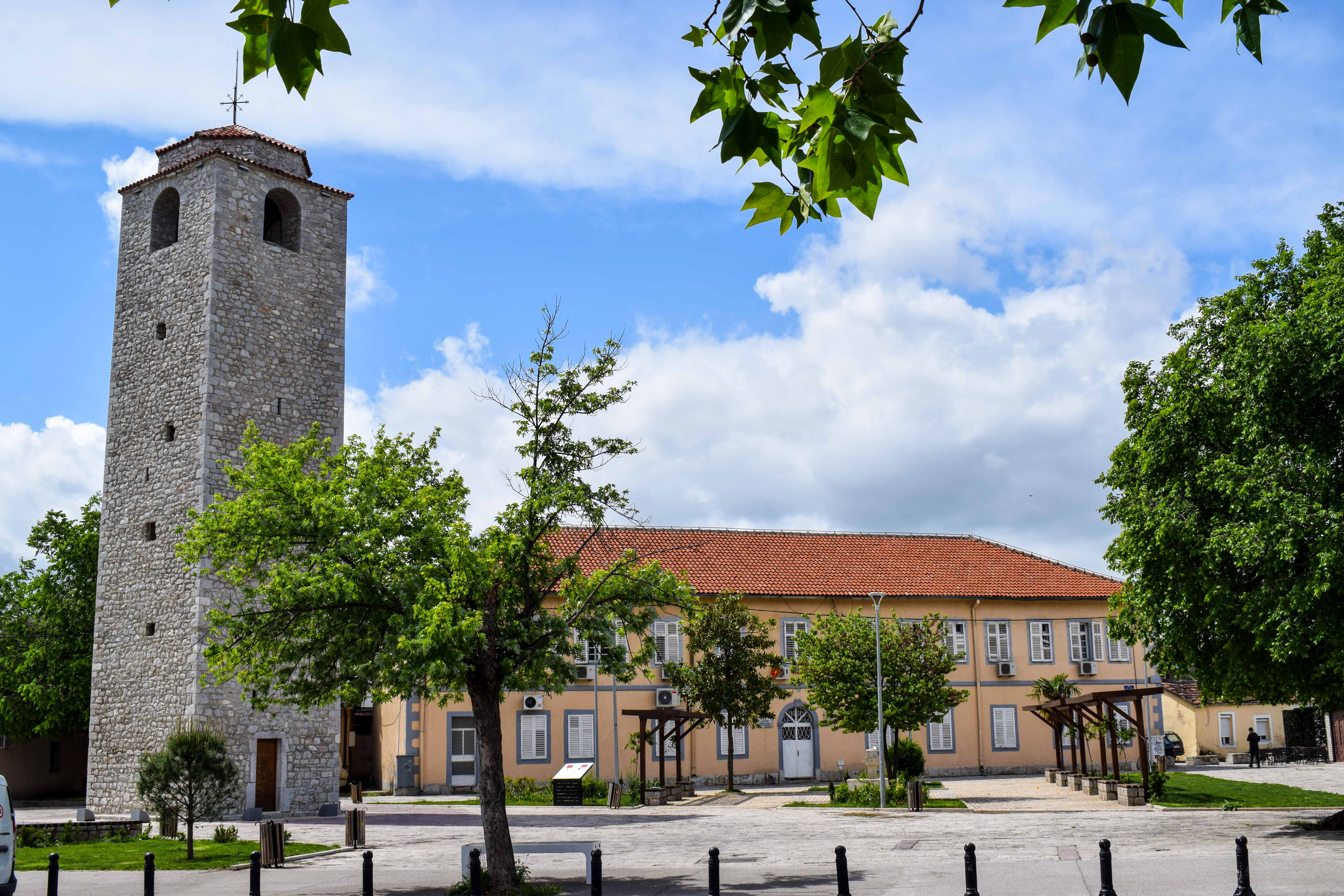
City Clock Tower

Most of today's Montenegro and Podgorica fell under the rule of the Albanian Bushati Family of Shkodra between 1757 and 1831, which ruled independently from the Imperial authority of the Ottoman Sultan.

In 1864, Podgorica became a kaza of the Scutari Vilayet called Böğürtlen ("blackberry", also known as Burguriçe).

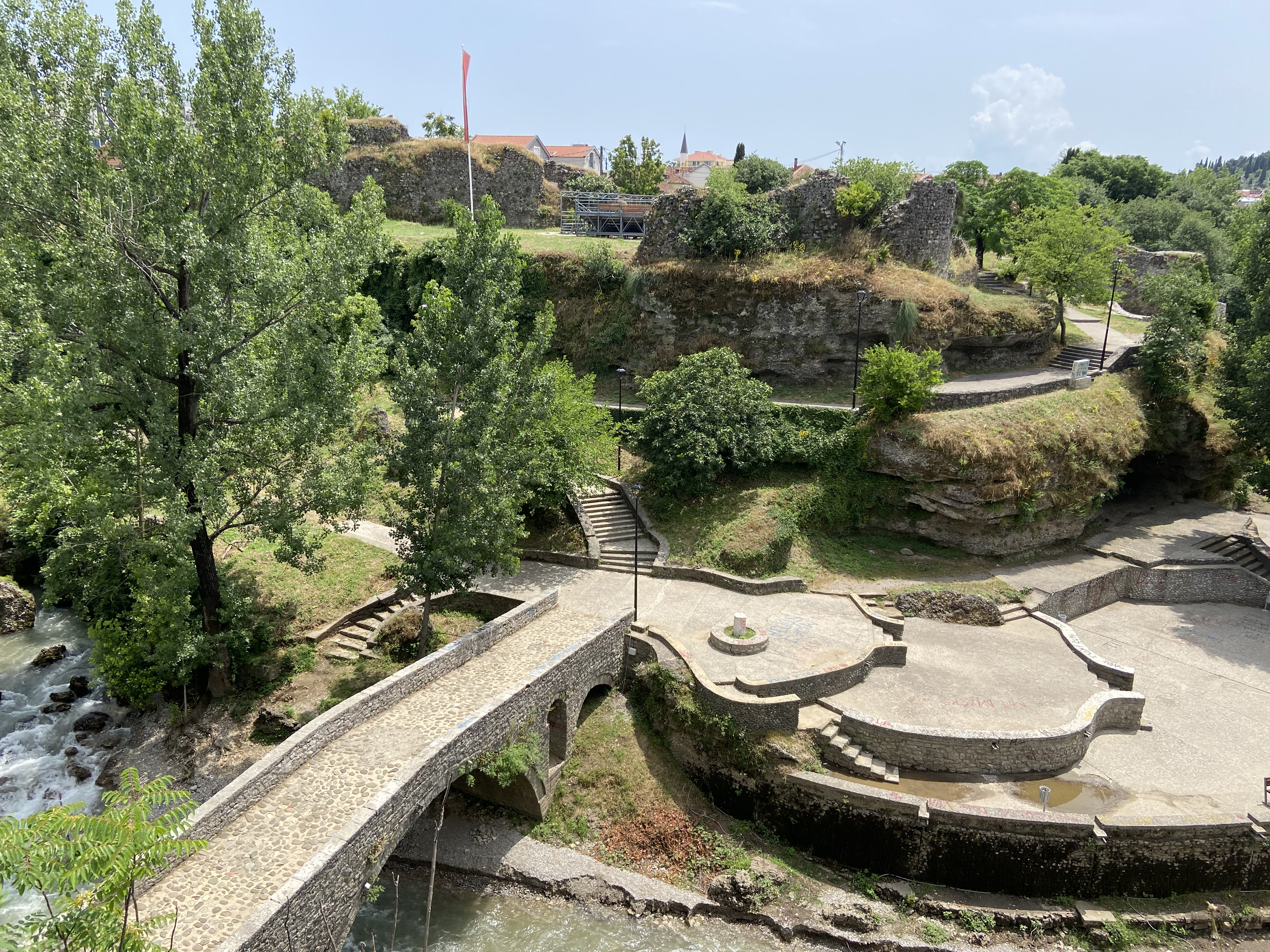
View of Ribnica fortress and Old bridge

On 7 October 1874, after the murder of a local officer Juso Mučin Krnić, Ottoman forces killed at least 17 people in Drač, Podgorica. The massacre was widely reported outside of Montenegro and contributed to the buildup to the Montenegrin-Ottoman War. The former Ottoman jail in Drač was later named "Jusovača" after Juso Mučin Krnić, and remained an active prison over the course of the remaining years of the Petrović dynasty, the Karađorđević dynasty, the interwar years, and throughout World War II.

The end of the Montenegrin-Ottoman War in 1878 resulted in the Congress of Berlin recognizing vast territories, including that of Podgorica, as part of the newly recognized Principality of Montenegro. At that time there were about 1,500 houses in Podgorica, with more than 8,000 people living there – of Orthodox, Roman Catholic, and Muslim faiths flourishing together.

=== The Petrović and Karađorđević monarchies ===
After the Berlin Congress in 1878, Podgorica was annexed to the Principality of Montenegro, marking the end of four centuries of Ottoman rule, and the beginning of a new era for Podgorica and Montenegro. The first forms of capital concentration were seen in 1902 when roads were built to all neighboring towns, and tobacco became Podgorica's first significant commercial product. In 1904, a savings bank named Zetska formed the first significant financial institution; this would soon grow into Podgorička Bank.

World War I marked the end of dynamic development for Podgorica, which by then was the largest city in the newly proclaimed Kingdom of Montenegro. On 10 August 1914, nine military personnel and 13 civilians were killed in Podgorica from an aerial bombardment by Austro-Hungarian Aviation Troops. The city was bombed three more times in 1915. Along with the rest of the Kingdom, Podgorica was occupied by Austria-Hungary from 1916 to 1918.

After the liberation by the Allies in 1918, the controversial Podgorica Assembly marked the end of Montenegrin statehood, as Montenegro was merged with the Kingdom of Serbia and incorporated into the Kingdom of Serbs, Croats, and Slovenes. The population of urban Podgorica during this interwar period was approximately 14,000.

During the interwar period (1918–1941), Podgorica had public bathrooms as most residents did not have their own. However, the Imperial hotel built in 1925 had two bathrooms, which was unprecedented at the time. It was one of at least six hotels built in the city during the interwar period.

=== World War II ===
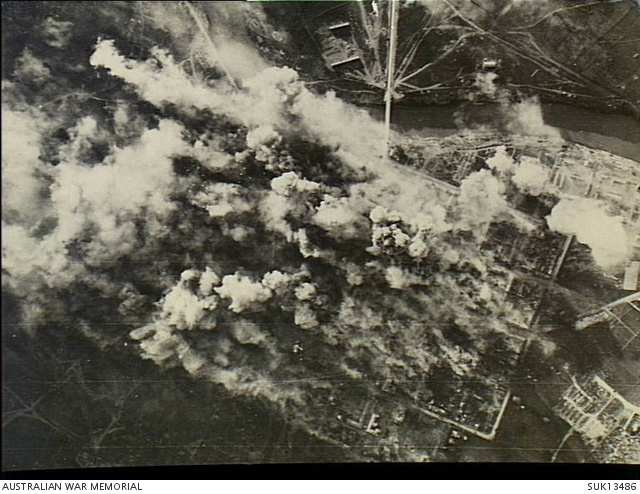
Bombing of Podgorica in World War II

After the Yugoslav coup d'état on 27 March 1941, demonstrations supporting the coup took place in Podgorica. As a result of the coup, Yugoslavia turned against its previous alliance with the Axis powers and was subsequently invaded. Podgorica was bombed over 80 times throughout the course of the war. The city was first bombed by the Luftwaffe on 6 April 1941. On 5 May 1944, Podgorica was bombed by the USAAF in an attack against Axis forces, although the bombardment that day killed approximately 400 civilians. The city was liberated on 19 December 1944. According to the Museum of Genocide Victims, a total of 1,691 people were killed in Podgorica over the course of the war.

=== Socialist Yugoslavia ===
On 12 July 1946, Josip Broz Tito made one of his early visits to Podgorica from the Radovče hotel, where he spoke to a crowd. It was the first of fifteen total visits made by Tito to the city after World War II.

"Podgorica is destroyed. We will build her altogether because it's our responsibility, because that's what's required of us by the sacrifices which Podgorica gave! We will do it, that's what I promise you in the name of the Federal government." – Josip Broz Tito on 12 July 1946.

On 25 July 1948, the vice president of the People's Parliament of Montenegro, Andrija Mugoša, along with secretary Gavron Cemović, signed a law changing the name of Podgorica into "Titovgrad". The law was "retroactively" activated such that the name change applied to any records starting from 13 July 1946, when it became the capital of Montenegro within the newly formed Socialist Federal Republic of Yugoslavia. However, in a contradiction, the "Službeni list" or legal code of Yugoslavia recorded the name "Titograd" without the letter "v". Ultimately, "Titograd" was used over "Titovgrad".

In addition to the new name, Titograd saw the establishment of new factories. The Radoje Dakić factory, built-in 1946 for the production of heavy machinery, became one of the largest employers in Titograd. In 1964, Radoje Dakić guaranteed hired workers an apartment in the city. In the late 1960s, the cities of Titograd, Zadar, and Mostar competed to be selected as the location of Yugoslavia's expanding aluminum industry. In a highly politicized selection process, Titograd was ultimately chosen and the Kombinat was constructed in 1969. In 1974, the public Veljko Vlahović University was founded in Titograd. On 15 April 1979, the city suffered damage by a 6.9 magnitude earthquake.

Titograd was the site of massive protests during Yugoslavia's anti-bureaucratic revolution. On 10 January 1989, over 10,000 people protested in the city. By the turn of the decade, Titograd was recognized as the city with the most greenery in Yugoslavia, along with Banja Luka.

=== Contemporary history ===
As Yugoslavia began to break up, Titograd was renamed to Podgorica after a referendum on 2 April 1992. On 25 May 1992, Podgorica was the site of a Serbian Radical Party rally of approximately 10,000 supporters, during which a Montenegrin Bosniak man named Adem Šabotić attempted to assassinate Vojislav Šešelj via hand bomb after his supporters chanted references to killing Muslims. Šešelj, his bodyguards, and a few bystanders were injured after the bomb detonated but no one was killed.

Otherwise, the Yugoslav wars largely bypassed Podgorica, but the entire country was greatly affected with severe economic stagnation and hyperinflation lasting throughout the 1990s due to international sanctions. In 1999, Podgorica was subject to airstrikes during the NATO bombing of Yugoslavia.

On 13 July 2005, the newly constructed Millennium Bridge opened for traffic. Following the results of the independence referendum in May 2006, Podgorica saw significant development as the capital of an independent state, including the reconstruction and renaming of the former Ivan Milutinović Square to Independence Square.

On 13 October 2008, at least 10,000 people protested against Kosovo's declaration of independence. On 19 December 2008, the Moscow Bridge opened for pedestrians.

On 7 August 2013, the 60-year old Hotel Crna Gora was demolished to make way for the new Hilton in its place, which opened in 2016. Construction of the Cathedral of Christ's Resurrection finished after 20 years on 7 October 2013.

In October 2015, protests took place in Podgorica ahead of Montenegro's accession into NATO. After a demonstration of between 5,000 and 8,000 people, the police used tear gas to disperse demonstrators from the parliament. Protests in the city continued through the 2016 Montenegrin parliamentary election. On 22 February 2018, the US embassy in Podgorica was attacked by a Yugoslav Army veteran.

== Administration ==
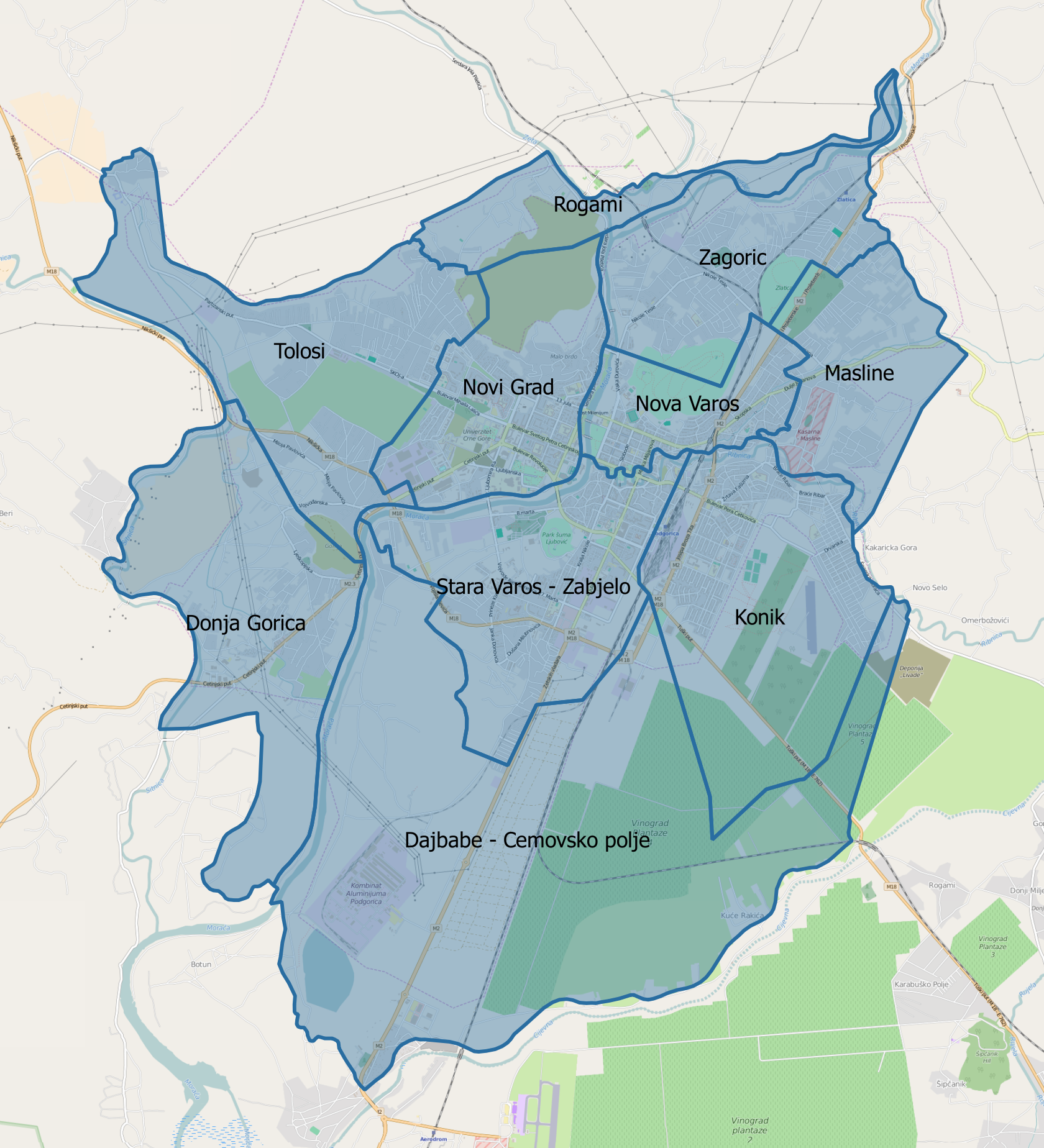
Podgorica urban subdivisions

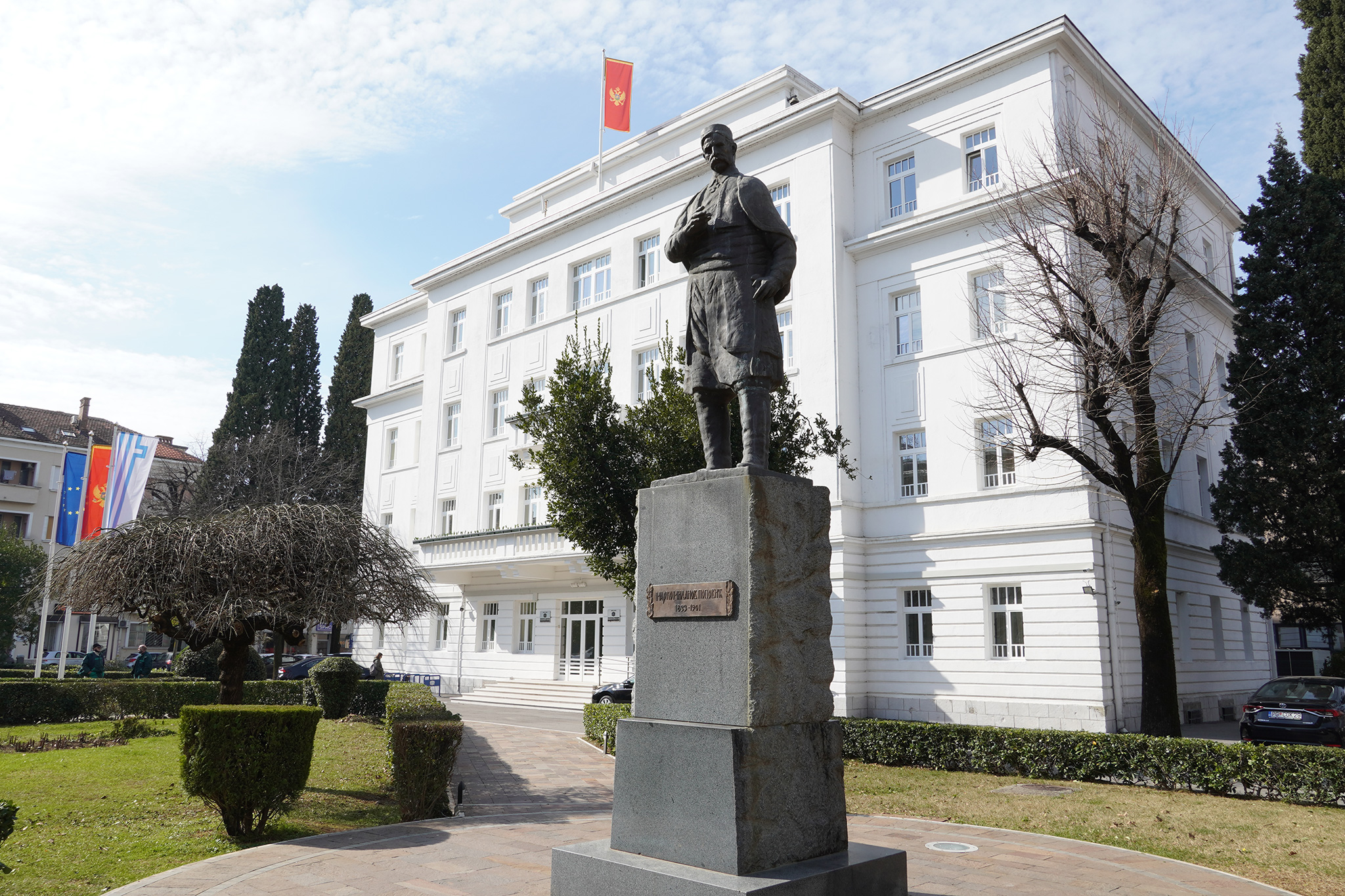
Podgorica City Hall and the monument to Marko Miljanov Popović

The city administration consists of a mayor, city assembly, and a number of secretariats and administrative bodies which together act as a city local government. The city assembly has 61 members, elected directly for four-year terms. The mayor used to be directly elected for a five-year term, but since the new law was introduced in Montenegrin municipalities mayors will be elected by the city assembly and will have to maintain its support during the term. In 2018, Tuzi became its own municipality after a vote on the Montenegrin Parliament. In 2022, Zeta became a separate municipality as well.

On local elections held on 25 May 2014, the Democratic Party of Socialists won 29 seats in the municipal assembly, one short of 30 needed to form a majority. Democratic Front won 17 seats, SNP won 8 seats, while coalition made of Positive Montenegro and SDP won 5 seats. After lengthy negotiations, SDP dissolved coalition with Pozitivna and made an arrangement on forming a majority with DPS, similar to one they have in national government. While SDP is a longtime partner of DPS at the national level, it has been in opposition to Podgorica municipal assembly in 2010–2014 period. Since October 2014, the position of the mayor is held by DPS official, Slavoljub Stijepović, replacing Podgorica mayor of 14 years, Miomir Mugoša. Since October 2018, the position of the Mayor is held by DPS Vice president Dr. Ivan Vuković, replacing Slavoljub Stijepović. On 13 April 2023, Olivera Injac from PES was sworn in as mayor, thus becoming the first non-DPS mayor since 1998.

=== City Assembly 2024–2028 ===
Party/coalition	Seats	Local government
Democratic Party of Socialists	19 / 59	Opposition
ZBCG (NSD–DNP)	11 / 59	Government
Europe Now	8 / 59	Government
Democratic Montenegro	6 / 59	Government
Movement for Podgorica	4 / 59	Government
United Reform Action	2 / 59	Opposition
Social Democrats	2 / 59	Opposition
Party of European Progress	2 / 59	Opposition
Movement Reversal	2 / 59	Opposition
Social Democratic Party	1 / 59	Opposition
Socialist People's Party	1 / 59	Government
United Montenegro	1 / 59	Government

=== Local subdivisions ===
The entire municipality of Podgorica is further divided into 66 local communities (мјесне заједнице, mjesne zajednice), bodies in which the citizens participate in decisions on matters of relevance to the local community.

== Geography ==
Podgorica is located in central Montenegro. The area is crossed with rivers and the city itself is only 15 kilometres (9.3 mi) north of Lake Skadar. The Morača and Ribnica rivers flow through the city, while the Zeta, Cijevna, Sitnica and Mareza flow nearby. Morača is the largest river in the city, being 70 m or 230 ft wide near downtown, and having carved a 20 m or 66 ft deep canyon for the length of its course through the city. Except for the Morača and Zeta, other rivers have an appearance of small creeks. The richness in bodies of water is a major feature of the city.

In contrast to most of Montenegro, Podgorica lies in a mainly flat area at the northern end of the Zeta plain, at an elevation of 40 m (130 ft). The only exceptions are hills which overlook the city. The most significant is 130.3 m (427 ft) high Gorica Hill (pronounced [ɡǒrit͡sa]), city's namesake, which rises above the city centre. The other hills include Malo brdo ("little hill", 205.4 m or 674 ft), Velje brdo ("big hill", 283 m or 928 ft), Ljubović (101 m or 331 ft) and Dajbapska gora (172 m or 564 ft). Podgorica city proper has an area of 108 square kilometres (42 sq mi), while actual urbanized area is much smaller.

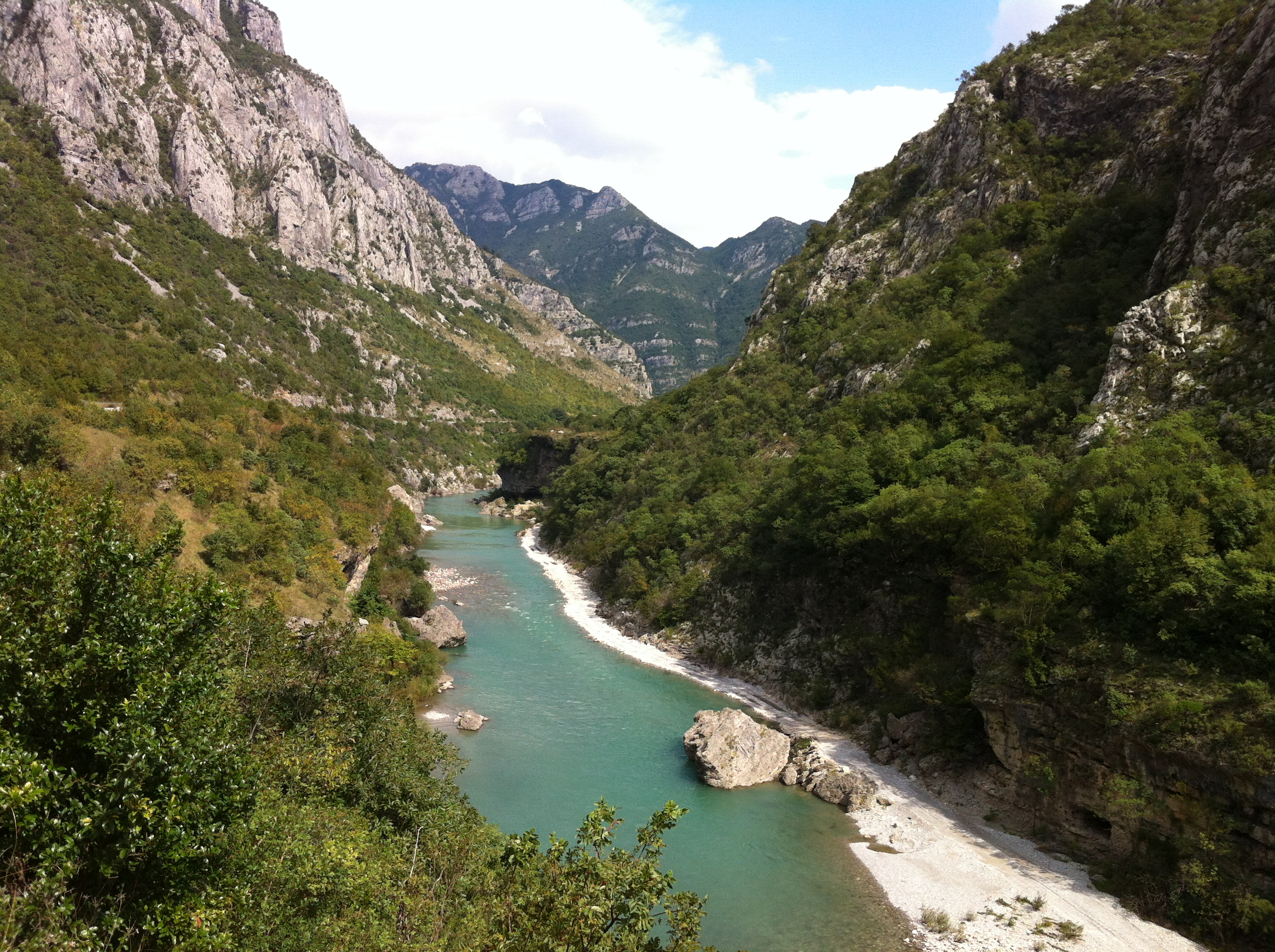
Morača river canyon

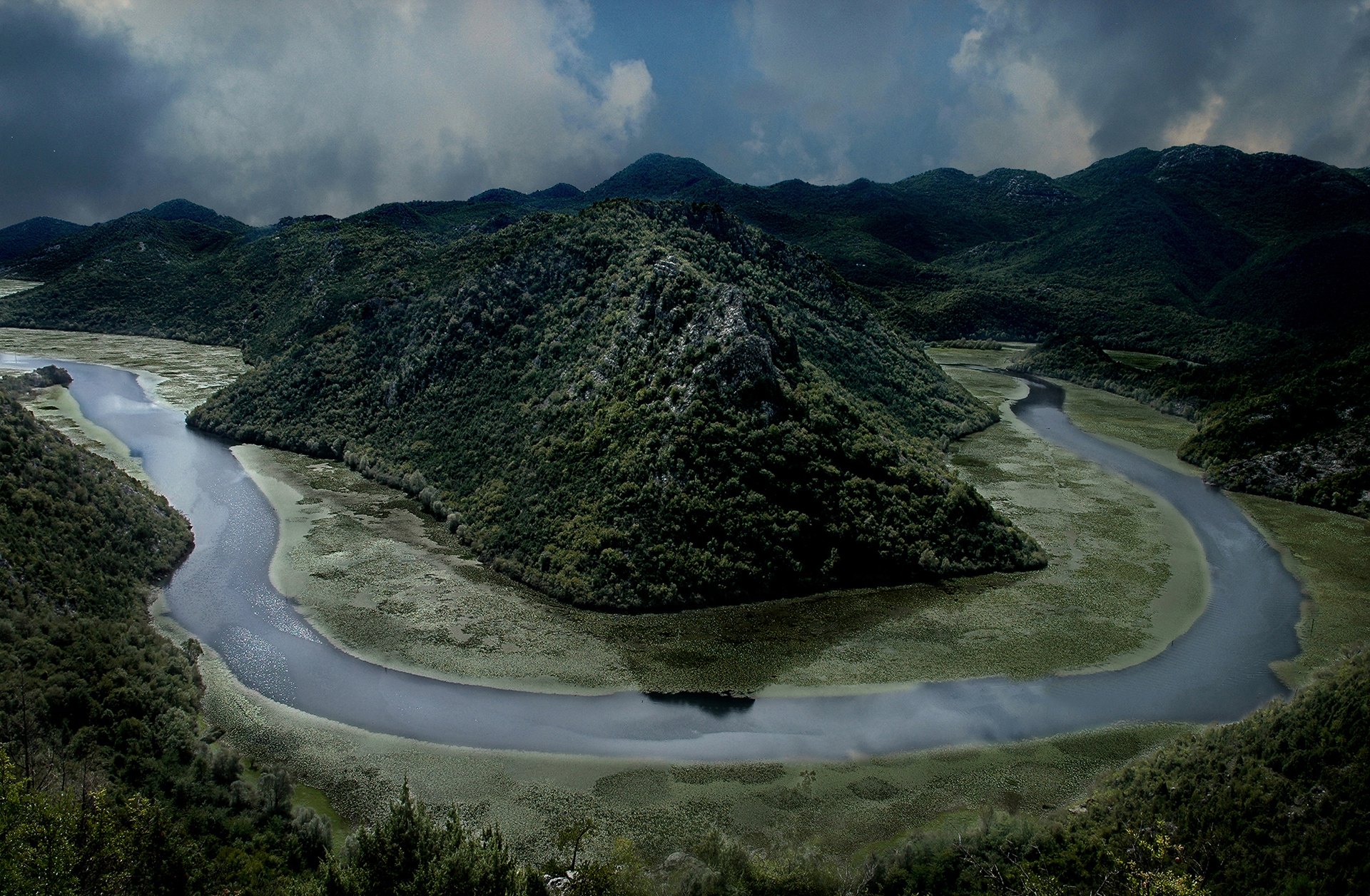
Lake Skadar

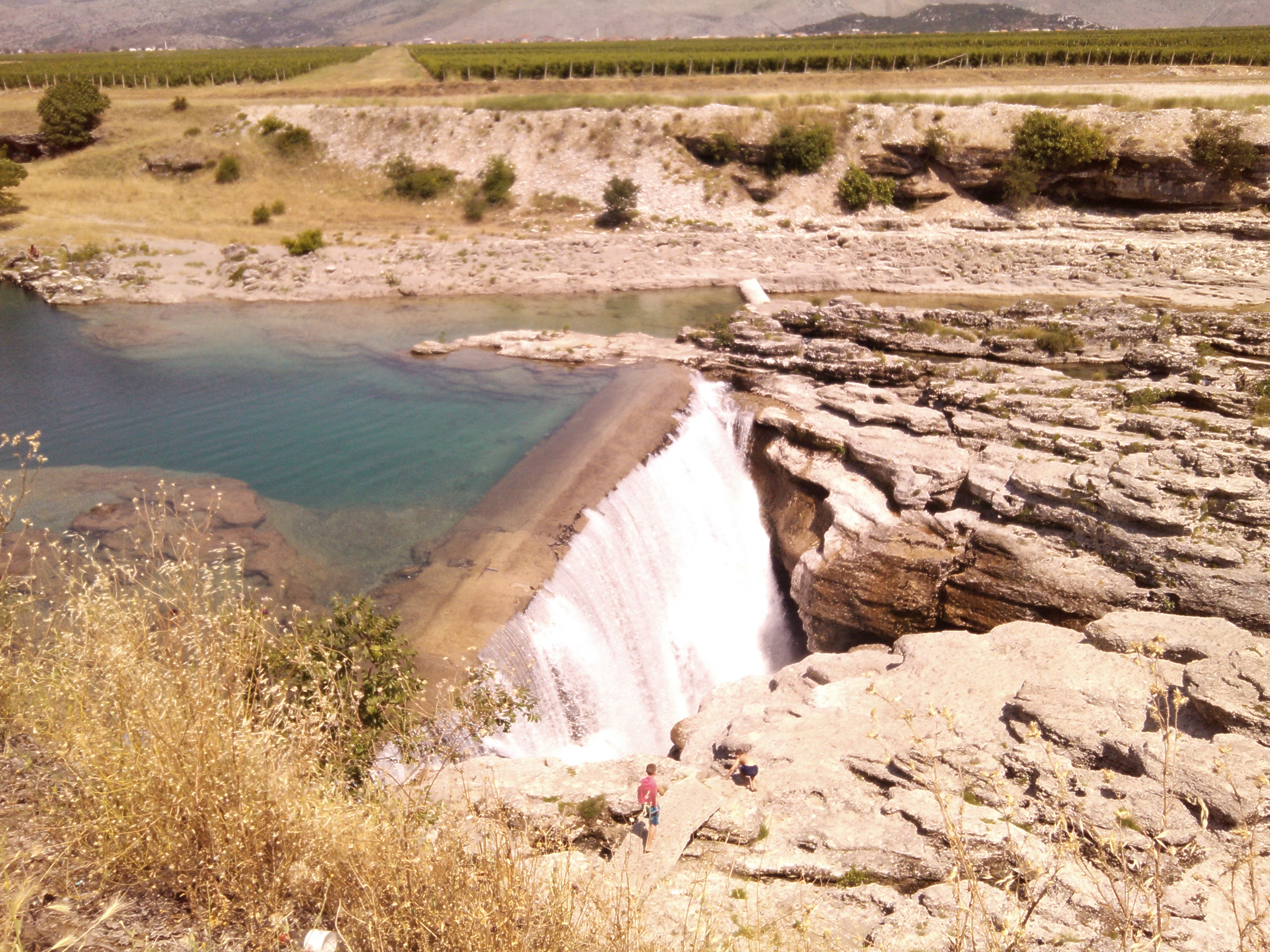
River Cijevna waterfalls near Podgorica

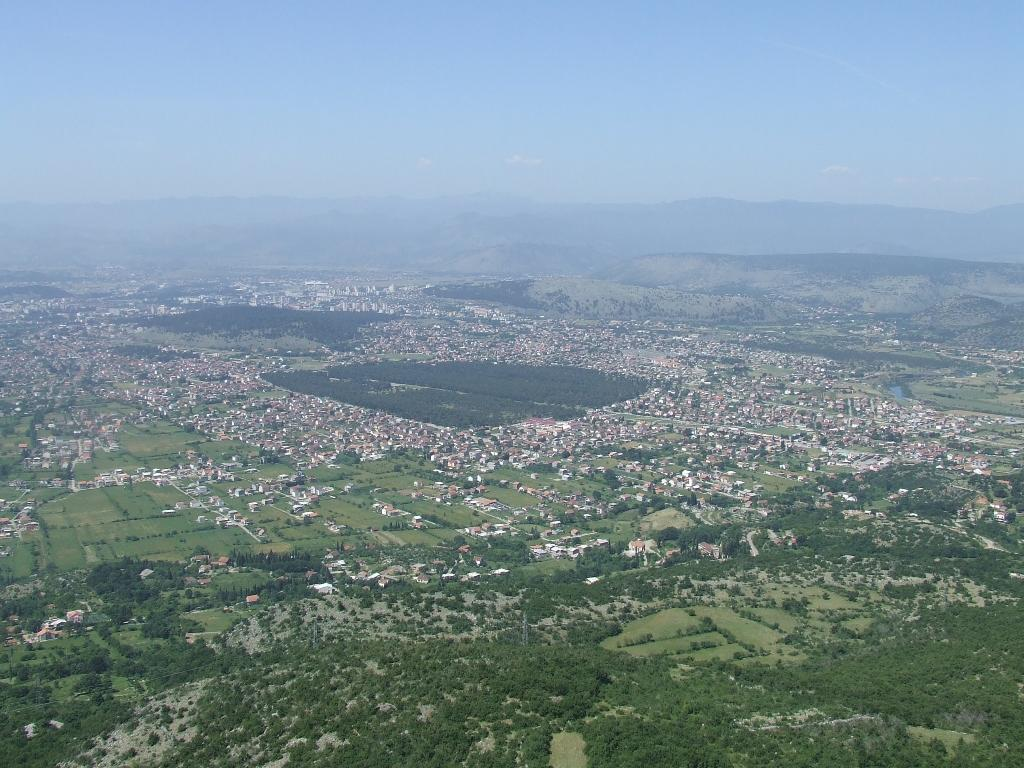
Podgorica panoramic view

=== Climate ===
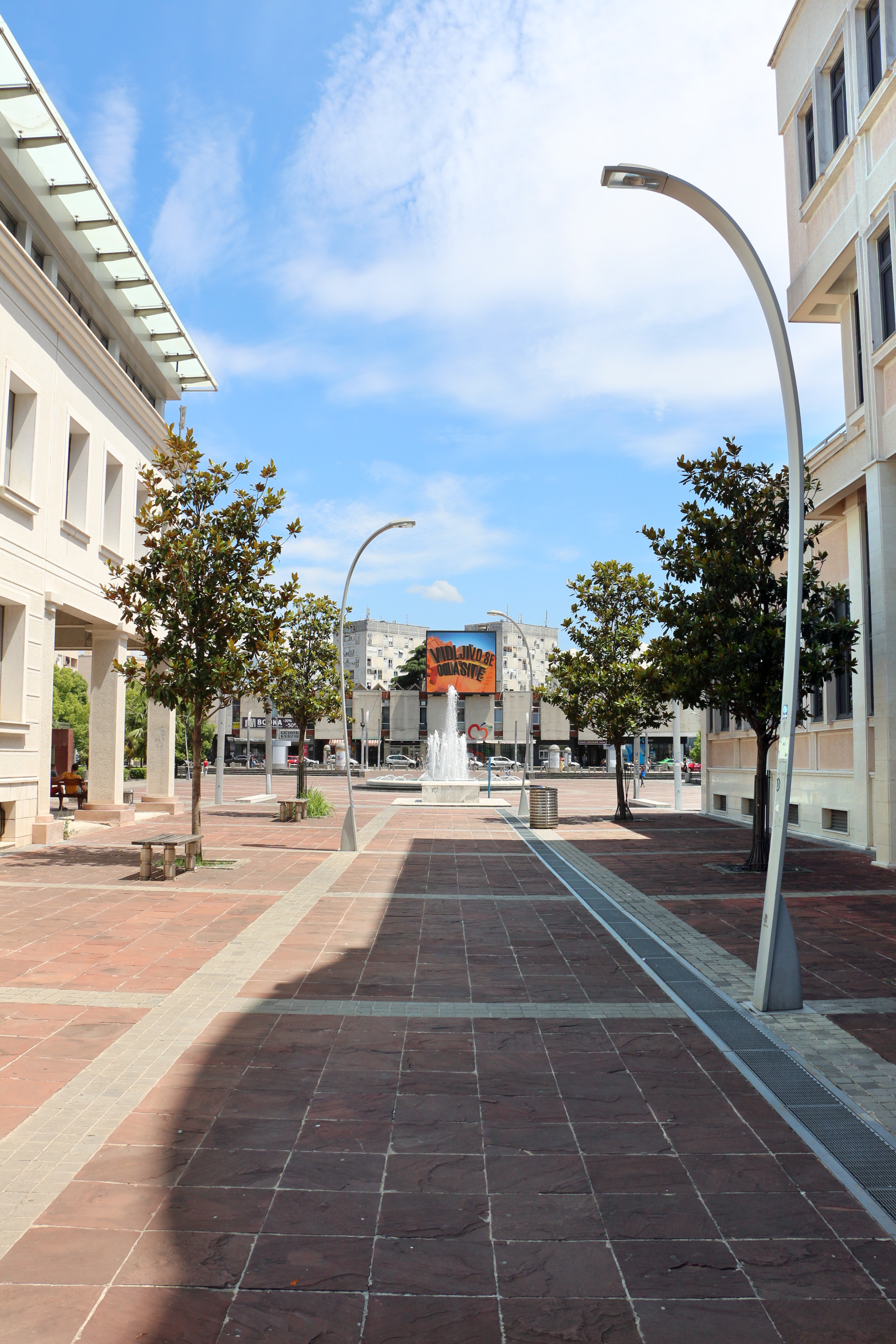
Independence Square

Under the Köppen climate classification, Podgorica is transitional between a humid subtropical climate (Cfa) and a hot-summer Mediterranean climate (Csa), since the driest summer month gets slightly less than 40 millimeters (1.6 in) of precipitation, with summer highs around 34 °C (93 °F) and winter highs around 11 °C (52 °F). Although the city is only some 35 km (22 mi) north of the Adriatic Sea, an arm of the Mediterranean, Mount Rumija acts as a natural barrier, separating Skadar Lake basin and Podgorica area from the sea, thus limiting temperate maritime influence on the local climate.

The mean annual rainfall is 1,659 mm (65.3 in), making Podgorica by far the wettest capital in Europe, Ljubljana being second with 1,362 mm (53.6 in). The temperature exceeds 25 °C (77 °F) on about 135 days each year. The number of rainy days is about 120, and those with a strong wind around 60. An occasional strong northerly wind influences the climate in the winter, with a wind chill effect lowering the perceived temperature by a few degrees.

The all-time maximum snowfall record was beaten on 11 February 2012, when 58 cm (23 in) of snowfall were measured. Before that, the biggest snowfall in Podgorica was in 1954, when 52 cm (20 in) of snowfall was recorded. Maximum temperature was recorded on 24 August 2007, at 44.8 °C (112.6 °F), while all time minimum was −9.7 °C (14.5 °F), on 4 February 1956.

Climate data for Podgorica (1991–2020, extremes 1947–present)
Month	Jan	Feb	Mar	Apr	May	Jun	Jul	Aug	Sep	Oct	Nov	Dec	Year
Record high °C (°F)	21.0 (69.8)	27.1 (80.8)	27.4 (81.3)	33.8 (92.8)	35.4 (95.7)	40.5 (104.9)	43.3 (109.9)	44.8 (112.6)	39.6 (103.3)	33.6 (92.5)	27.2 (81.0)	20.8 (69.4)	44.8 (112.6)
Mean maximum °C (°F)	16.5 (61.7)	18.2 (64.8)	22.9 (73.2)	26.8 (80.2)	31.9 (89.4)	36.3 (97.3)	39.2 (102.6)	39.5 (103.1)	34.6 (94.3)	29.3 (84.7)	22.0 (71.6)	17.1 (62.8)	40.2 (104.4)
Mean daily maximum °C (°F)	11.0 (51.8)	12.6 (54.7)	16.3 (61.3)	20.7 (69.3)	25.8 (78.4)	30.7 (87.3)	33.9 (93.0)	34.5 (94.1)	28.4 (83.1)	22.8 (73.0)	16.5 (61.7)	11.8 (53.2)	22.1 (71.7)
Mean daily minimum °C (°F)	2.2 (36.0)	3.4 (38.1)	6.4 (43.5)	9.9 (49.8)	14.5 (58.1)	18.9 (66.0)	21.6 (70.9)	21.8 (71.2)	17.0 (62.6)	12.3 (54.1)	7.4 (45.3)	3.5 (38.3)	11.6 (52.8)
Mean minimum °C (°F)	−4.2 (24.4)	−2.8 (27.0)	0.9 (33.6)	4.6 (40.3)	9.1 (48.4)	13.5 (56.3)	16.5 (61.7)	16.3 (61.3)	11.9 (53.4)	6.8 (44.2)	1.1 (34.0)	−2.5 (27.5)	−5.6 (21.9)
Record low °C (°F)	−9.6 (14.7)	−9.7 (14.5)	−5.6 (21.9)	−0.2 (31.6)	1.2 (34.2)	8.0 (46.4)	12.2 (54.0)	8.8 (47.8)	6.0 (42.8)	0.0 (32.0)	−5.4 (22.3)	−8.0 (17.6)	−9.7 (14.5)
Average precipitation mm (inches)	165 (6.5)	164 (6.5)	164 (6.5)	136 (5.4)	98 (3.9)	60 (2.4)	36 (1.4)	54 (2.1)	147 (5.8)	176 (6.9)	261 (10.3)	232 (9.1)	1,693 (66.8)
Average precipitation days (≥ 0.1 mm)	12	12	12	13	10	9	5	6	7	9	14	13	122
Average relative humidity (%)	72	68	65	65	63	60	52	52	62	68	75	74	65
Mean monthly sunshine hours	122.7	126.0	170.0	193.5	250.8	276.3	339.7	314.1	251.5	201.4	126.4	108.8	2,481.2
Percentage possible sunshine	41	46	50	54	60	70	81	78	69	55	41	37	57
Source 1: National Oceanic and Atmospheric Administration
Source 2: Hydrological and Meteorological Service of Montenegro

Climate data for Podgorica Airport (Golubovci) (1991–2020 normals)
Month	Jan	Feb	Mar	Apr	May	Jun	Jul	Aug	Sep	Oct	Nov	Dec	Year
Mean daily maximum °C (°F)	10.5 (50.9)	12.2 (54.0)	15.2 (59.4)	18.8 (65.8)	24.2 (75.6)	29.8 (85.6)	32.7 (90.9)	33.2 (91.8)	27.4 (81.3)	22.2 (72.0)	16.0 (60.8)	11.3 (52.3)	21.1 (70.0)
Daily mean °C (°F)	5.8 (42.4)	7.1 (44.8)	10.0 (50.0)	13.6 (56.5)	18.8 (65.8)	24.0 (75.2)	26.6 (79.9)	27.1 (80.8)	22.0 (71.6)	17.0 (62.6)	11.5 (52.7)	7.2 (45.0)	15.9 (60.6)
Mean daily minimum °C (°F)	1.2 (34.2)	2.0 (35.6)	4.7 (40.5)	8.4 (47.1)	13.4 (56.1)	18.1 (64.6)	20.4 (68.7)	21.0 (69.8)	16.5 (61.7)	11.9 (53.4)	7.0 (44.6)	3.2 (37.8)	10.7 (51.2)
Source: Meteostat

== Demographics ==
Historical population
Year	Pop.	±%
1948	14,369	—
1953	19,868	+38.3%
1961	35,054	+76.4%
1971	61,727	+76.1%
1981	96,074	+55.6%
1991	117,875	+22.7%
2003	136,473	+15.8%
2011	150,977	+10.6%
2023	173,024	+14.6%
Population size may be affected by changes in administrative divisions.

With a population of 179,505, Podgorica is by far the most populous city in Montenegro. The area of former Podgorica Municipality (Podgorica Capital City, Tuzi and Zeta Municipalities) has a population of 208,555, while the Podgorica urban area population is 173,024.

According to 2023 census, Podgorica has 64,140 households and 88,431 dwellings. At the end of 2023, there were 90,799 vehicles registered in Podgorica, including 78,047 passenger vehicles and 1,564 motorcycles.

Out of the total population of Podgorica, 47.81% are male and 52.19% are female. The average age of the population is 37.65. There are 11,626 foreign nationals in Podgorica, making up 6,5% of city population.

In October 2024, 112,482 residents of Podgorica were officially employed, earning €981 on average.

Almost 92% of residents speak one of the mutually intelligible offshoots of Serbo-Croatian language, including Montenegrin and Serbian language .

=== Ethnicity ===
The town's population in 2023 census was 54.73% Montenegrins, 30.34% Serbs, 2.72% Bosniaks, and 12.21% are other ethnic minorities

=== Religion ===
Religion in Podgorica (2023)
1. Eastern Orthodoxy (79.2%)
2. Islam (10.9%)
3. Roman Catholicism (1.65%)
4. Irreligion (4.70%)
5. Other religions (0.04%)

Serbian Orthodox Cathedral of the Resurrection of Christ

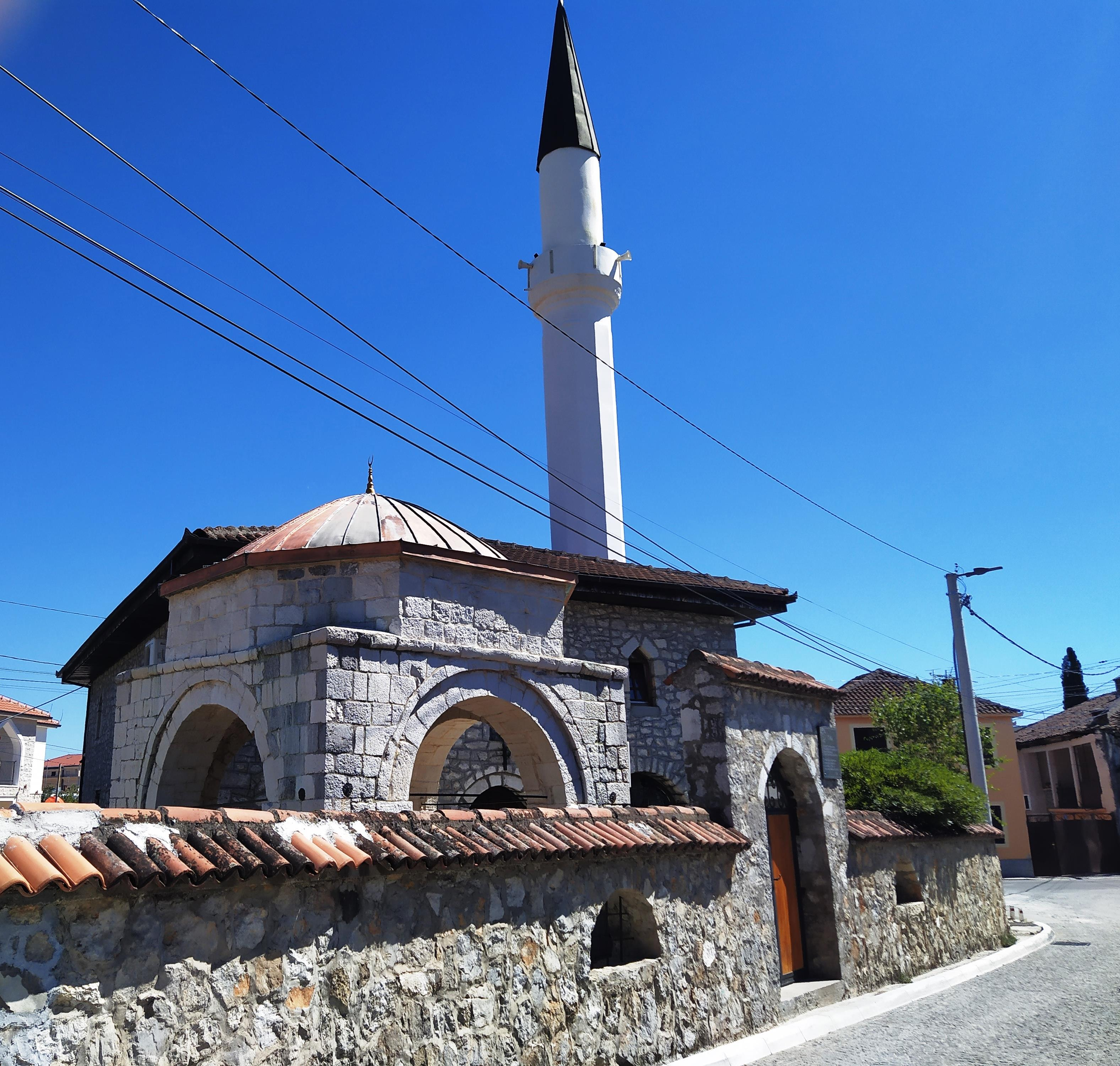
Osmanagić Mosque

Most Podgorica residents declare themselves as Orthodox Christians, while there are sizable Muslim and Catholic communities.

Prominent Orthodox Christian places of worship include the Church of St. George and the landmark Cathedral of the Resurrection of Christ.

Church of the Holy Heart of Jesus, built in 1966 in Konik neighbourhood, is notable for its unique brutalist architecture, and serves as a primary place of worship for Podgorica Catholic community.

== Economy ==
Podgorica is not only the administrative center of Montenegro but also its main economic engine. Most of Montenegro's industrial, financial, and commercial base is in Podgorica.

Before World War I, most of Podgorica's economy was in trade and small-scale manufacturing, which was an economic model established during the long rule of the Ottoman Empire. After World War II, Podgorica became Montenegro's capital and a focus of the rapid urbanization and industrialization of the SFRY era. Industries such as aluminium and tobacco processing, textiles, engineering, vehicle production, and wine production were established in and around the city. In 1981, Podgorica's GDP per capita was 87% of the Yugoslav average.

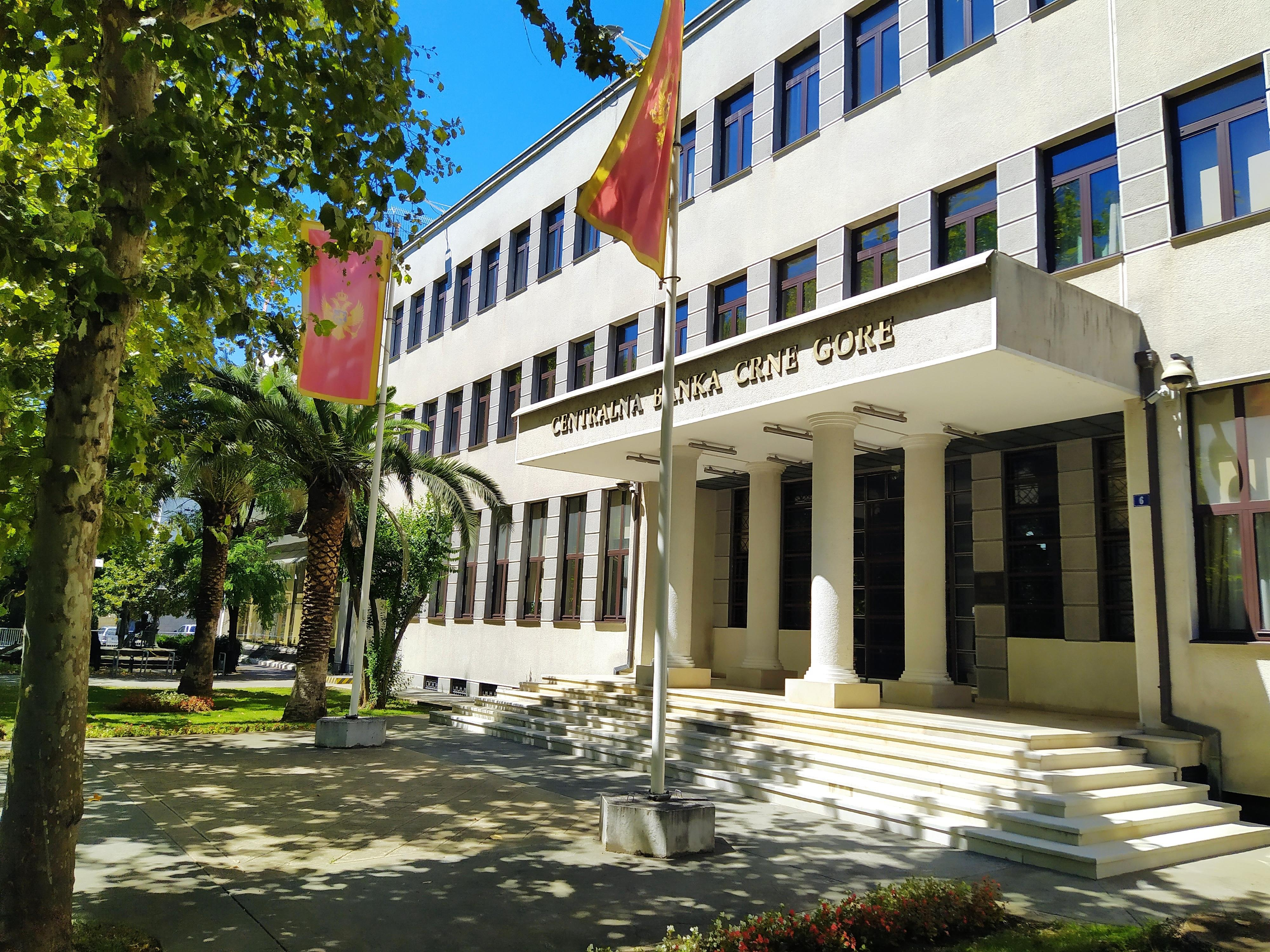
Headquarters of the Central Bank of Montenegro

In the early 1990s, the dissolution of Yugoslavia, Yugoslav wars, and the UN-imposed sanctions left Podgorica's industries without traditional markets, suppliers, and available funds. This, combined with typical transition pressures, led to a decline of the industrial base, where many industries collapsed leaving thousands of citizens unemployed. However, some of the industries, including Plantaže, managed to survive the turmoil of the 1990s, and are still major contributors to Montenegrin export and industrial output to this day.

As Montenegro began its push for independence from Serbia in the late 1990s, Podgorica greatly benefited from the increased concentration of government and service sectors. In addition to almost the entire country's government, Podgorica is home to the Montenegro Stock Exchange and other major Montenegrin financial institutions, along with telecommunications carriers, media outlets, Montenegrin flag carrier airline, and other significant institutions and companies.

The large presence of government and service sectors spared the economy of Podgorica from prolonged stagnation in the late 2000s recession, which hit Montenegro hard. Although in mid-2014, some 30% of Montenegro's citizens lived in Podgorica, the municipality accounted for 44% of the country's employed. Out of the entire mass of paid net salaries in Montenegro in that year, some 47% was paid in Podgorica. The average monthly net salary in December 2021 was €537 in Podgorica municipality.

=== Tourism ===
Further cultural and historic monuments in and around Podgorica are Sahat kula (Clock tower) Adži-paše Osmanagića, the ruins of the Ribnica fortress, remnants of the city of Doclea, Stara Varoš, and Vezirov most (Vizier's bridge). Podgorica has excellent transit connections with other centres.

At nine kilometres from the city is the International Airport, with railway and bus stations close to one another.

Hotel Podgorica and Bemax skyscraper

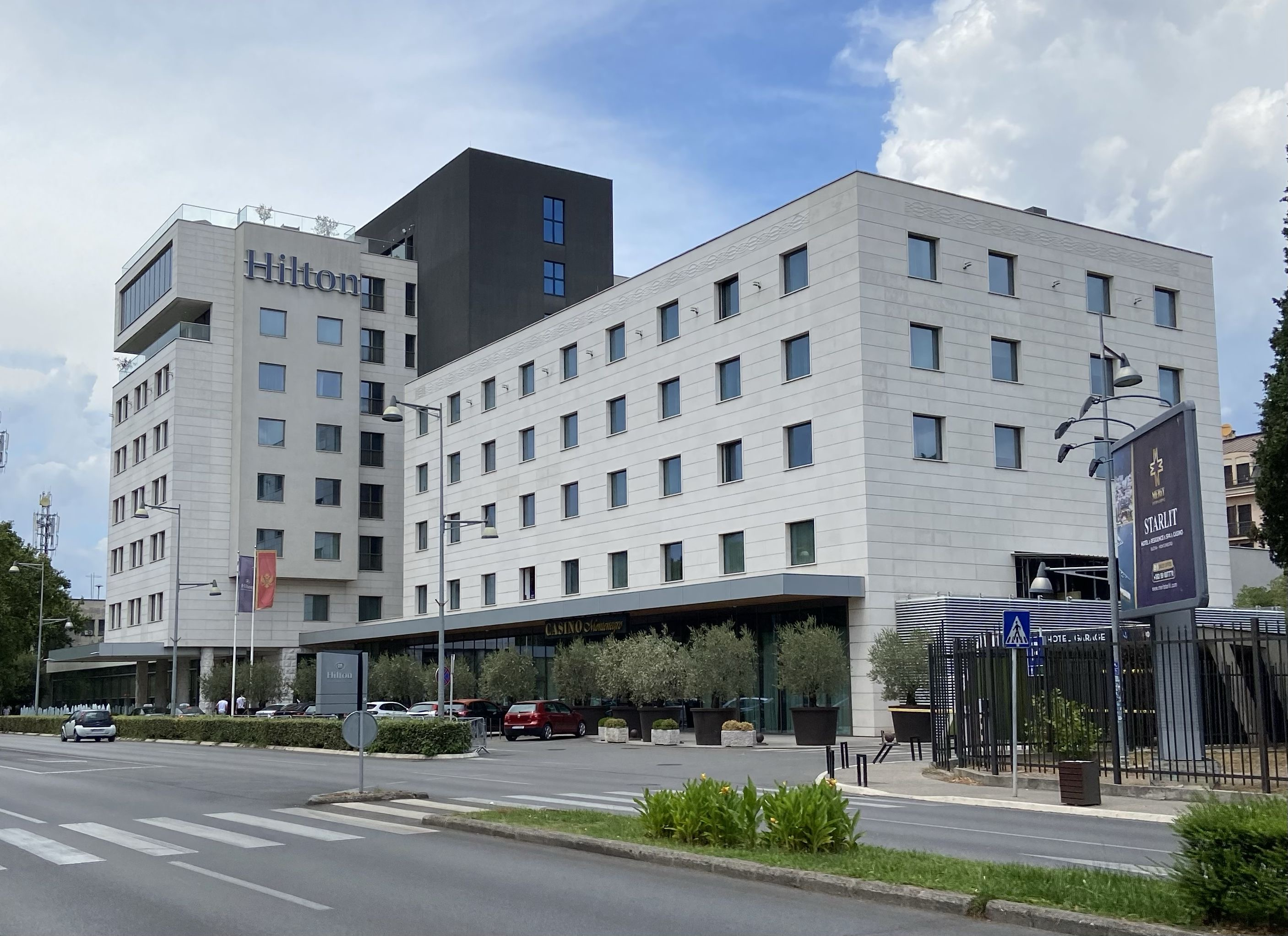
Hotel Hilton

=== Media ===
Podgorica is the media hub of Montenegro. It is home to the headquarters of the state-owned public television broadcaster RTCG. It has also its local TV and radio station Gradska. Commercial broadcasters in Podgorica include TV Vijesti, Prva TV, Nova M and Adria TV.

All Montenegro's daily newspapers (the oldest Montenegrin daily newspaper Pobjeda, Vijesti, Dnevne Novine and Dan) are published in Podgorica.

== Transport ==
=== Public transport ===
Podgorica public transport system consists of 30 bus lines, including 12 high-frequency urban bus lines which interconnect urban neighborhoods of the city; the rest are suburban lines which provide public transport between city center and adjacent suburban and rural settlements. Suburban lines are often covered by minibus / passenger van vehicles, and their low frequency schedule mainly caters to students travelling daily to schools in central Podgorica.

In 2001 - 2022 period, Podgorica public transport was entirely subcontracted to private companies, but this model has led to fragmented ticketing policies, unreliable schedules and sub-par service. Since 2023, public transport service is entirely provided by the city owned Putevi public utility company, which has led to marked improvement of public transport service in Podgorica.

Dispatched taxi service is a very popular mode of transportation in Podgorica.

=== Roads ===
Due to its central location, Podgorica is a natural hub of Montenegro road network, with two major transit connections meeting at the city:

- E65/E80 north south axis, in various stages of upgrade to motorway standard. To the north, Princess Xenia motorway is completed up to Kolašin, and will eventually extend to border with Serbia. Princess Xenia motorway and Sozina tunnel construction to the south, have made both Adriatic coast and mountain resorts in northern Montenegro accessible from Podgorica in half and hour drive.
- E762 east west axis, which is a major transit route from Croatia / Bosnia, via Nikšić and Podgorica, towards Albania. It will eventually be upgraded to motorway standard.

Until motorway network is completed (an expensive and slow process, due to mountainous terrain in Montenegro), Podgorica transit connectivity was improved by gradually upgrading all major highways exiting the city to the double carriageway standard. A major portion of double carriageway southern bypass was constructed in 2010s, redirecting significant transit traffic outside of the urban core.

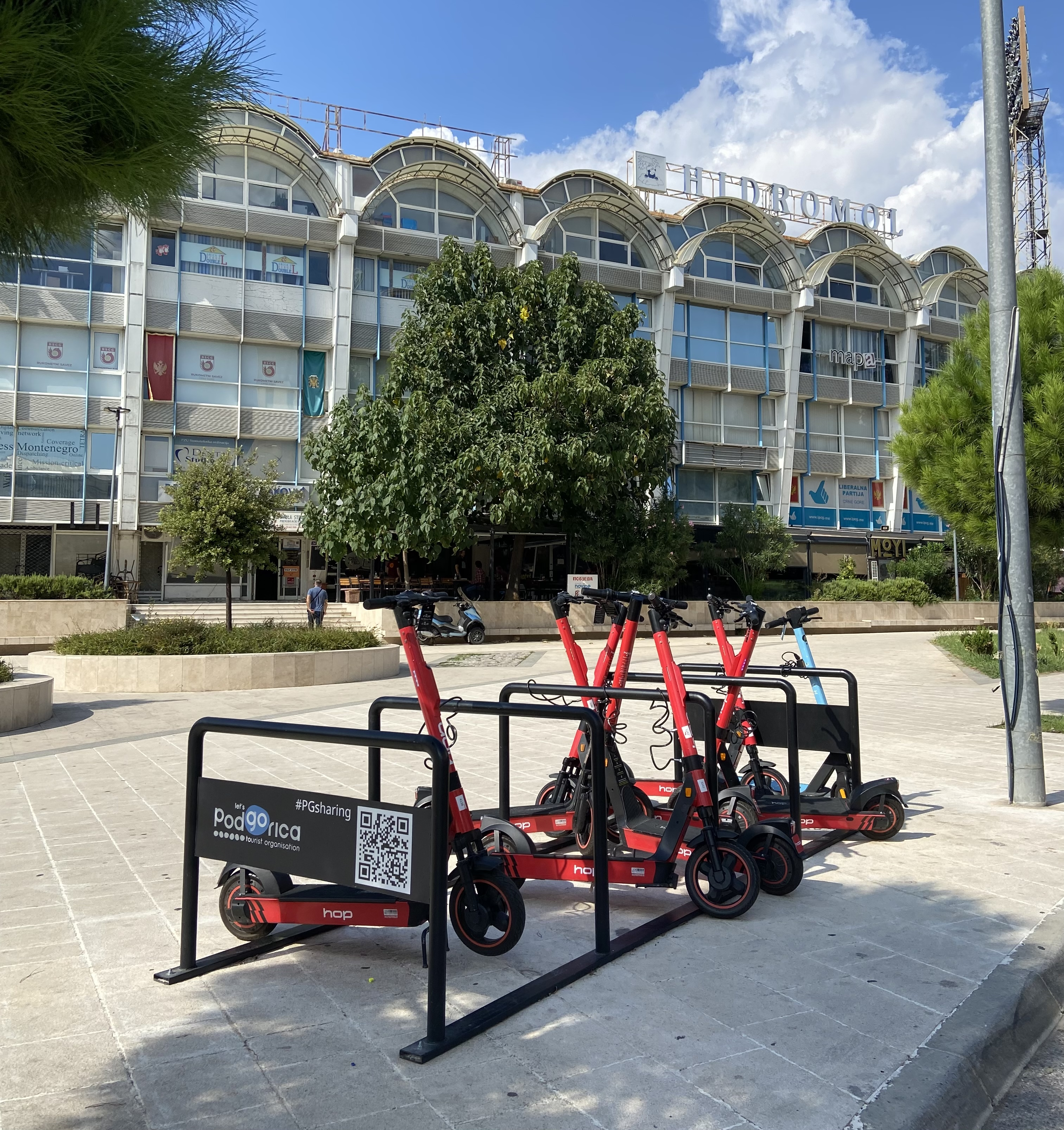
Rental electric scooters

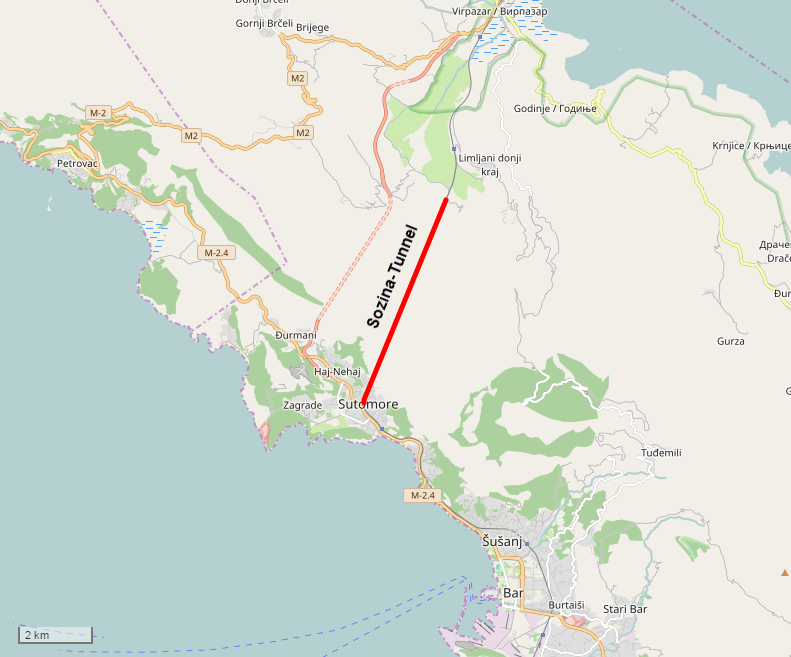
Sozina Tunnel shortens the journey from Podgorica to Montenegro's main port Bar, by some 25 km.

Northern entrance to Podgorica (E65, E80)

=== Rail ===
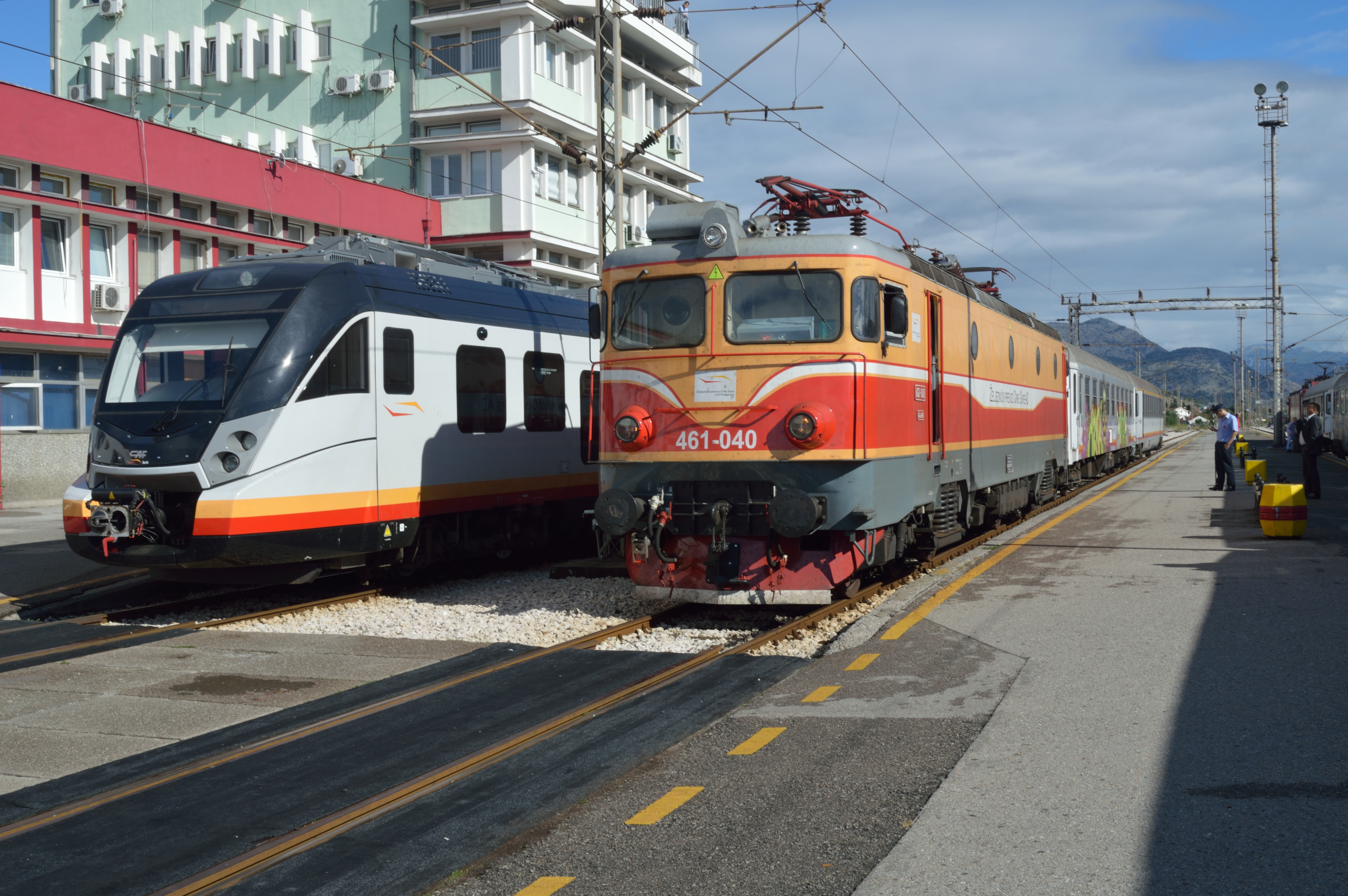
Podgorica Rail Station

Podgorica is a hub of the X-shaped Montenegrin rail network. The Belgrade–Bar line converges with the line to Nikšić and line to Shkodër at the Podgorica Rail Station. The station itself is located 1.5 km (0.93 mi) to the southeast of the main city square. Podgorica's main railway link (for both passenger and freight traffic) is Belgrade–Bar. Passenger service to Nikšić was introduced in 2012, after (electrification) and reconstruction of the railway link;. The rail link to Shkodër is used as freight-only.

=== Air ===
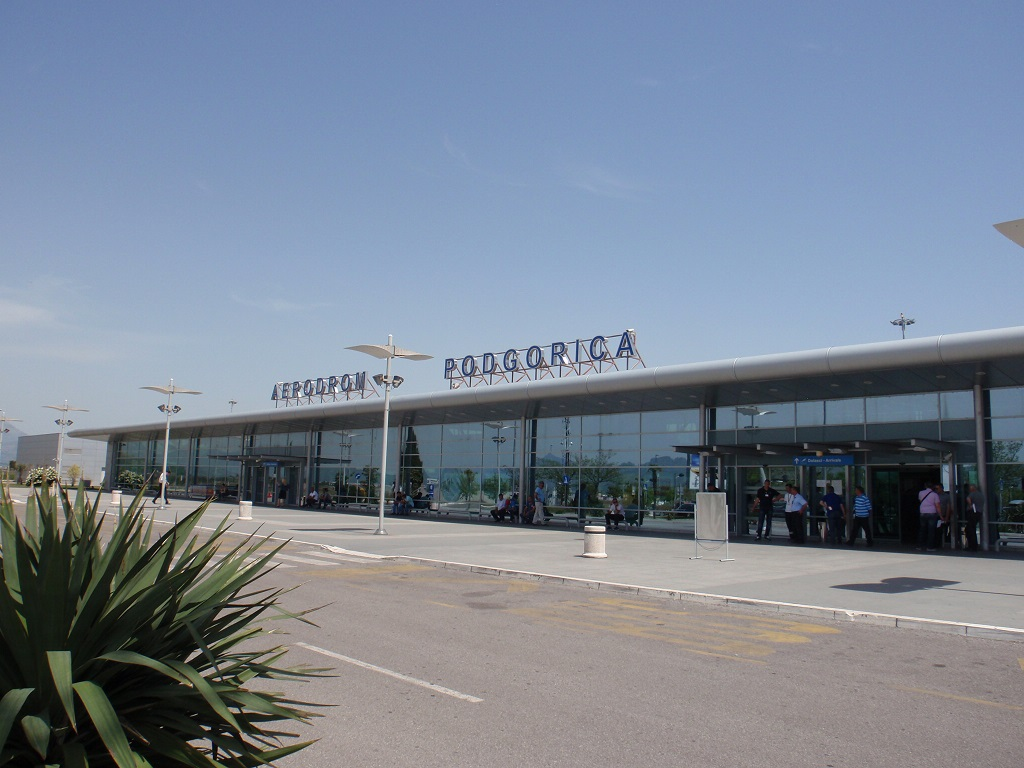
Podgorica Airport

Podgorica is served by Podgorica Airport, located in Zeta Plain, 11 km (6.8 mi) south of Podgorica City centre. The airport has year-round connections to major European hubs, and has served over 1.7 million passengers in 2025.

== Education ==
Most of Montenegro's higher education establishments are in Podgorica including the University of Montenegro, the country's most significant university.

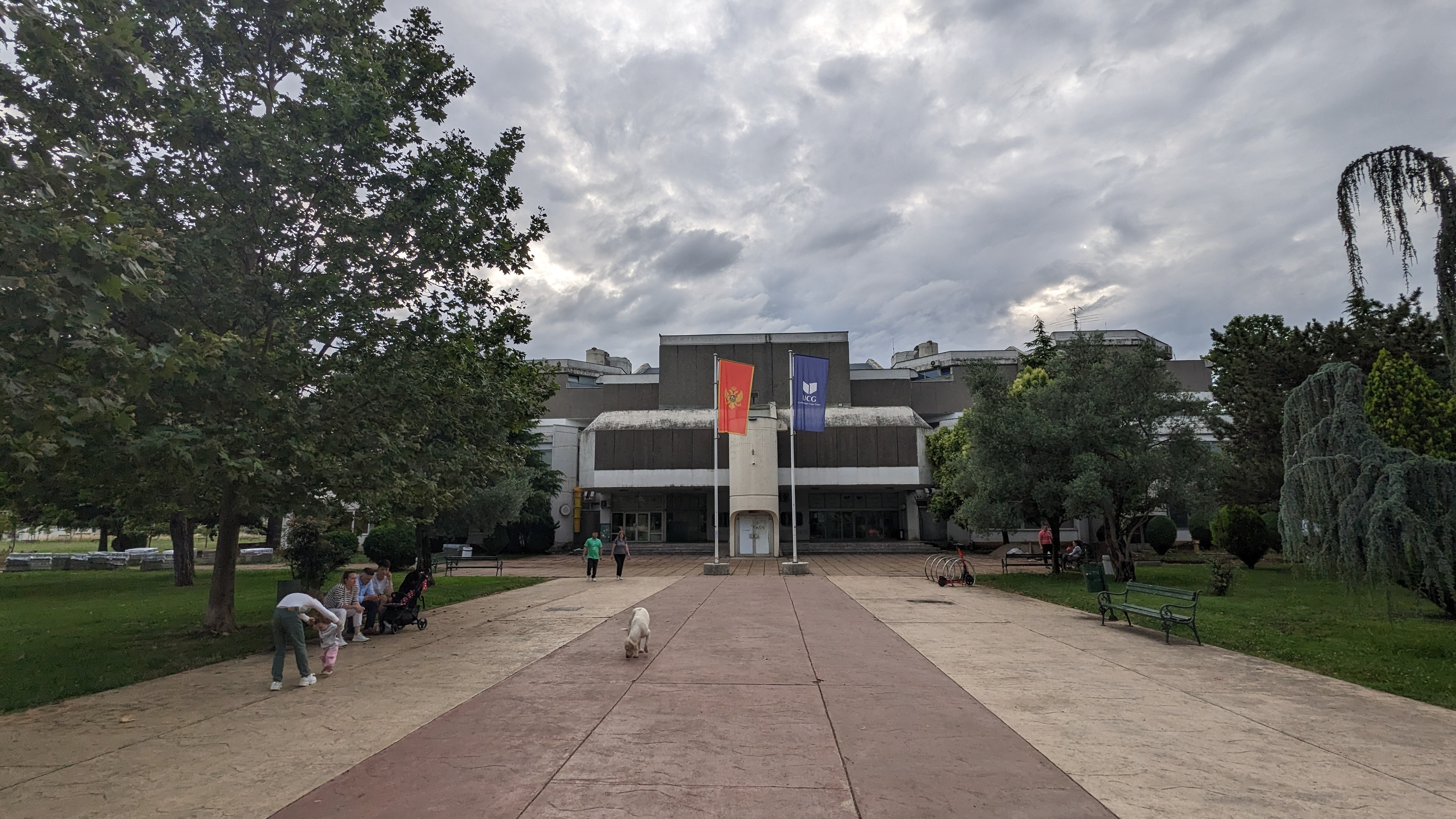
University of Montenegro

The university's scientific research institutes are also in the Podgorica: Institute of Foreign Languages, Institute of Biotechnology and the Institute of History.

The Montenegrin Academy of Sciences and Arts (CANU) is in Podgorica, as well as the parallel scholars' academy DANU.

There are a number of private institutions for higher education including the Mediterranean University which was founded in 2006 as the first private university in Montenegro and the University of Donja Gorica. The municipality of Podgorica has 34 elementary schools and 10 secondary schools, including one gymnasium. The first secondary school established in Podgorica is Gymnasium "Slobodan Škerović" which first opened in 1907. The rebuilt economic high school offers new features and higher quality education. The "Radosav Ljumović National Library" is considered the most comprehensive in Montenegro.

== Culture ==
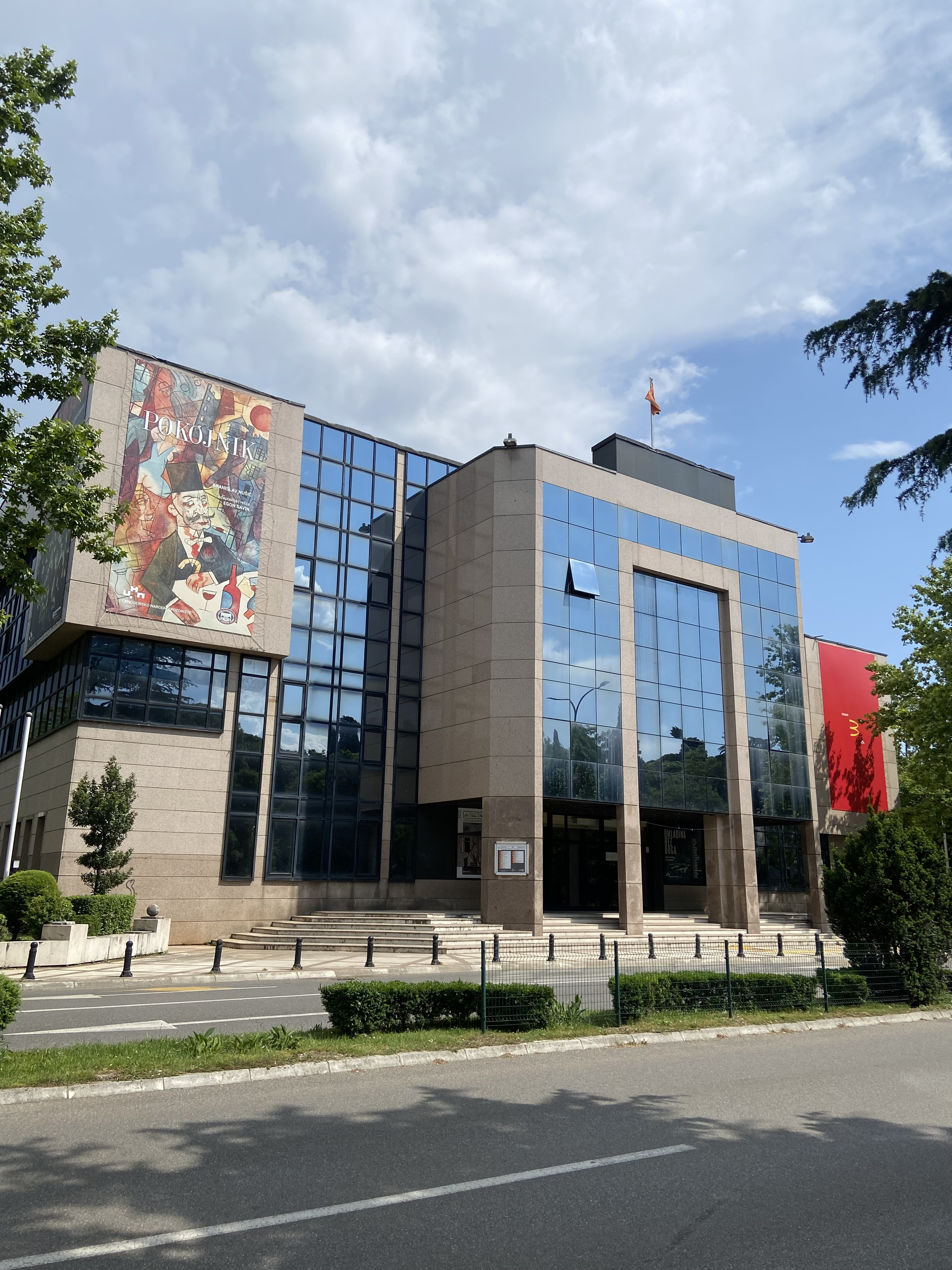
Montenegrin National Theatre

Podgorica is home to many Montenegrin cultural institutions and events. It hosts the Montenegrin National Theatre and a number of museums and galleries. The Montenegrin National Theatre is the most significant theatre not only in Podgorica but in all of Montenegro. Podgorica is also host to the City Theatre (Gradsko pozorište), which includes the Children's Theatre and the Puppet Theatre. Although not as rich in museums and galleries as the historic royal capital Cetinje, there are several noteworthy museums:

- The Podgorica City Museum (Muzej grada Podgorice) preserves Podgorica's rich heritage. Founded in 1950, it has four categories: archaeological, ethnographic, historical, and cultural-historical. It houses artifacts that date back to the Roman and Illyrian eras.
- The Archaeological Research Centre (Centar za arheološka istraživanja) was founded in 1961. Its mission is to gather, classify, restore and display archaeological sites.
- The Marko Miljanov Museum (Muzej Marka Miljanova) in Medun shows life in 19th-century Montenegro.
- The Natural History Museum (Prirodnjački muzej) displays specimens of Montenegrin flora and fauna. This museum has no exhibition space of its own, despite many proposals and initiatives to build one.

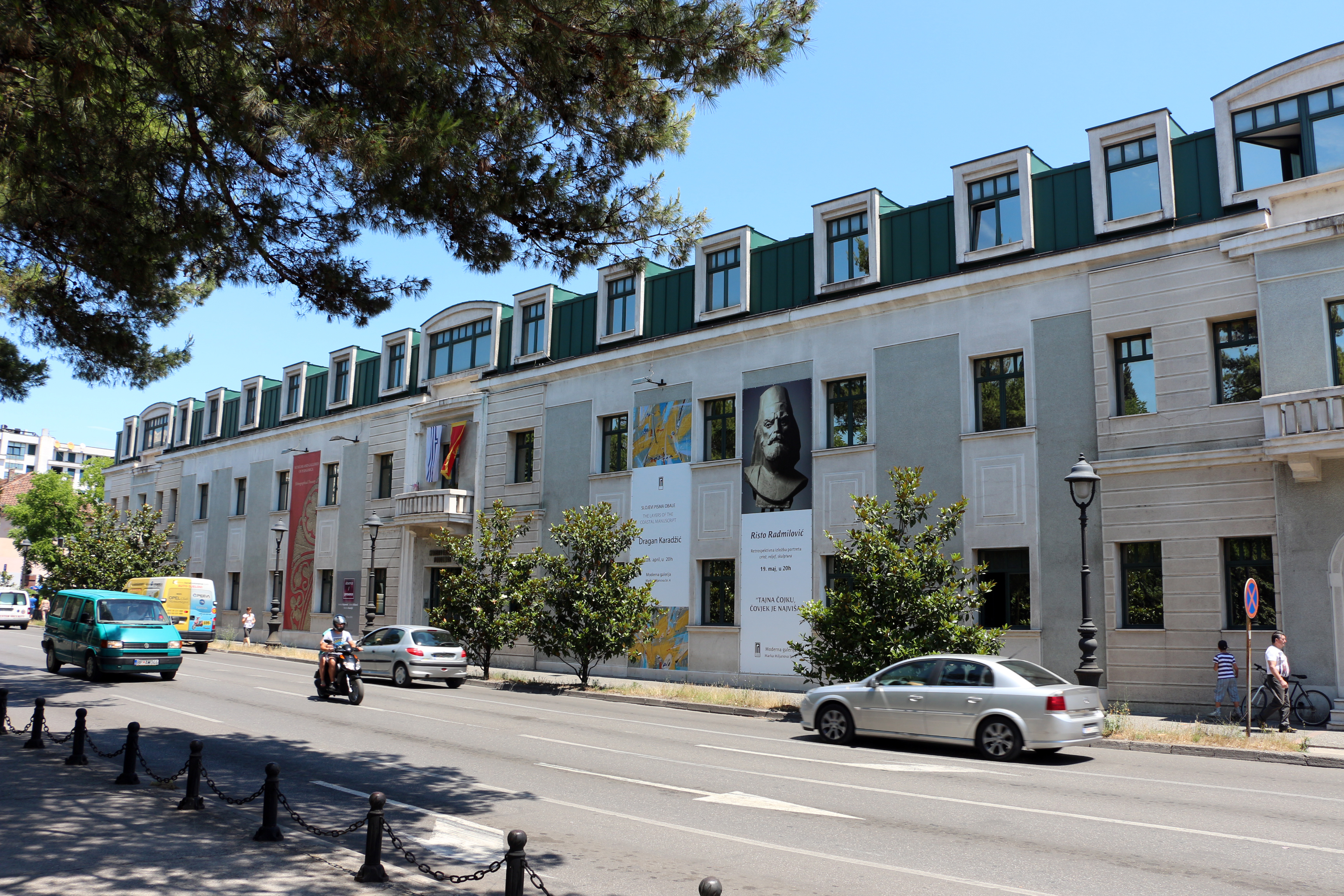
Podgorica City Museum

There is a notable art gallery in the Dvorac Petrovića (Podgorica Royal Palace) complex in Podgorica's largest public park. The palace hosted the "Josip Broz Tito" Art Gallery of the Nonaligned Countries between 1984 and 1995. King Nicholas's castle, Perjanički Dom (House of the Honour Guard), castle chapel and surrounding buildings were converted to an art gallery in 1984. Since 1995, it has been part of the Modern Arts Centre (Centar savremenih umjetnosti) and houses approximately 1,500 works of art. The historic Cinema of Culture (Kino Kultura), which was founded in 1949, was closed in November 2008 due to continuous financial losses it generated. It was the only cinema in the city for 6 decades. The building of the former cinema will be converted to host the Podgorica City Theatre. Shortly after its closure, a Ster Cinemas (later acquired by Cineplexx) 6-screen multiplex cinema opened at BIG Podgorica shopping mall.

A significant cultural institution of over fifty years' standing is the Budo Tomović Cultural-Informational Centre (KIC Budo Tomović). It is a public institution that organizes various artistic events, including Podgorica Cultural Summer (Podgoričko Kulturno Ljeto), FIAT – International Alternative Theatre Festival (Festival Internacionalnog Alternativnog Teatra), DEUS – December Arts Scene (Decembarska Umjetnička Scena).

== Sport ==
The most popular sports by far are football and basketball. Basketball became especially popular with the success in the late 20th and early 21st centuries of KK Budućnost, both in Regional and European competitions.

Football in Podgorica has a long tradition associated with Budućnost. World-famous players Predrag Mijatović and Dejan Savićević were born in Podgorica and made their debut in that team. The club, along with FK Zeta from Golubovci and Sutjeska from Nikšić, usually compete with each other for leading position in the First League of Montenegro. Other clubs from Podgorica and its surroundings play in the Montenegrin First League e.g. OFK Titograd & Kom. One of the most popular clubs from the suburbs is FK Ribnica from Konik, FK Zabjelo from Zabjelo and FK Podgorica from Donja Gorica.

The volleyball team OK Budućnost and the women's handball team ŽRK Budućnost T-Mobile have had significant success in European competition. Budućnost Podgorica is the most important sports club in Podgorica. Its name means Future.

Chess is another popular sport and some famous global chess players, like Slavko Dedić, are born in Podgorica.

Sporting events like the annual Podgorica Marathon, Coinis no limits Triathlon, and the Morača River jumps attract international competitors. In 2026, the city also hosted the 34th European Kendo Championship, bringing martial arts delegations from across the continent to compete. Podgorica was the host of 2009 FINA Men's Water Polo World League.

=== Venues ===
Podgorica has a number of sporting venues; some are under reconstruction and expansion. The main ones are:

- Podgorica City Stadium has a capacity of 11,264 and is the home of FK Budućnost Podgorica and the Montenegro national football team. It is the only venue in Montenegro that complies with FIFA standards for international football matches.
- Morača Sports Center, a multi-functional indoor sports facility. It has a capacity of 6,000 seats. It hosted one group of EuroBasket 2005, while other games were played in Belgrade, Vršac, and Novi Sad.
- Bemax Arena, indoor and outdoor sports facility. It has a capacity of 2,400 seats.

Almost every football club in Podgorica has its own stadium, although these are often only fields with small stands or no stands at all.

Other notable venues are the Stadion malih sportova under Gorica hill and the sport shooting range under Ljubović hill. There are many other sports facilities around the city, most notably indoor football fields.

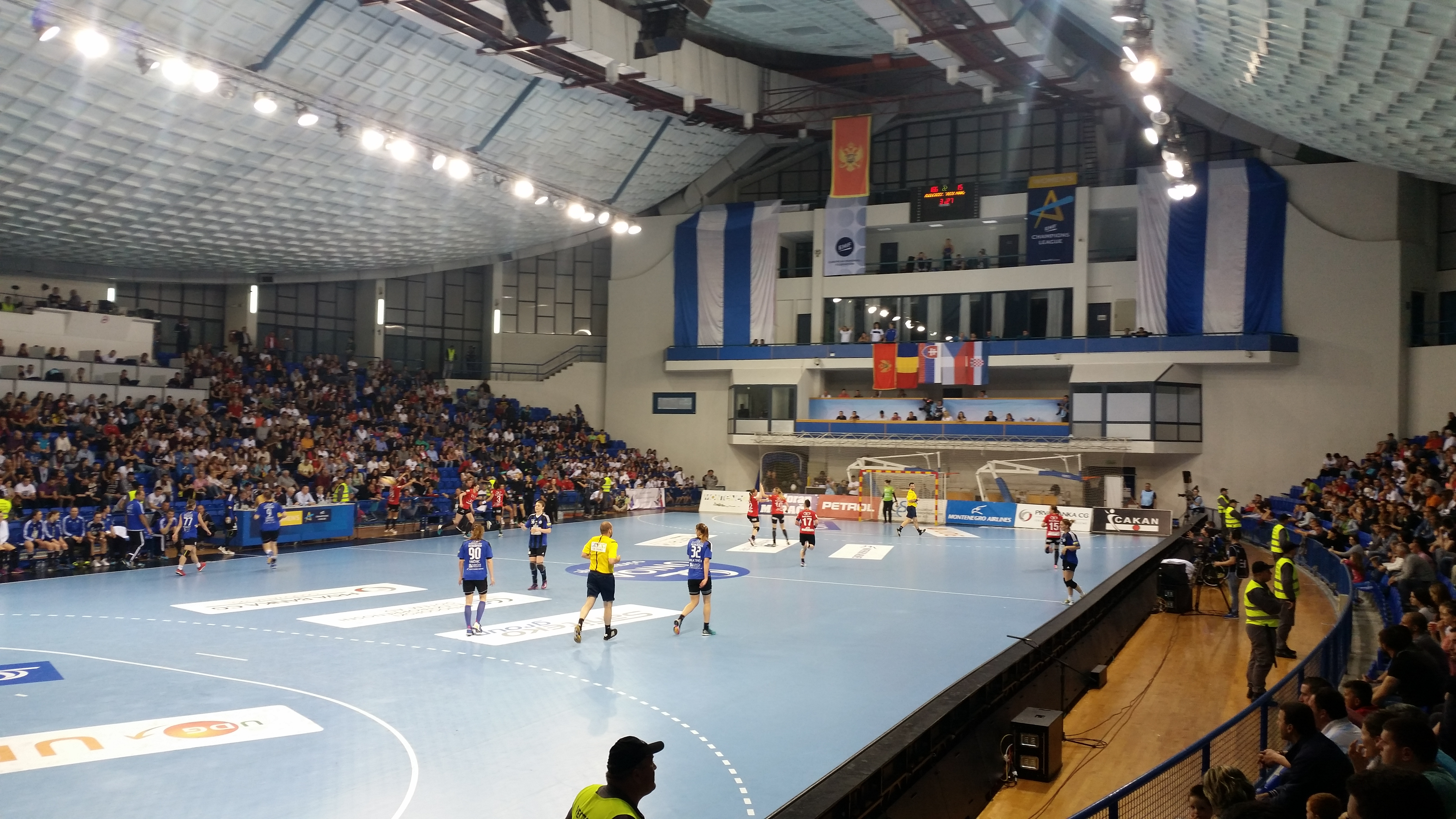
Morača Sports Center

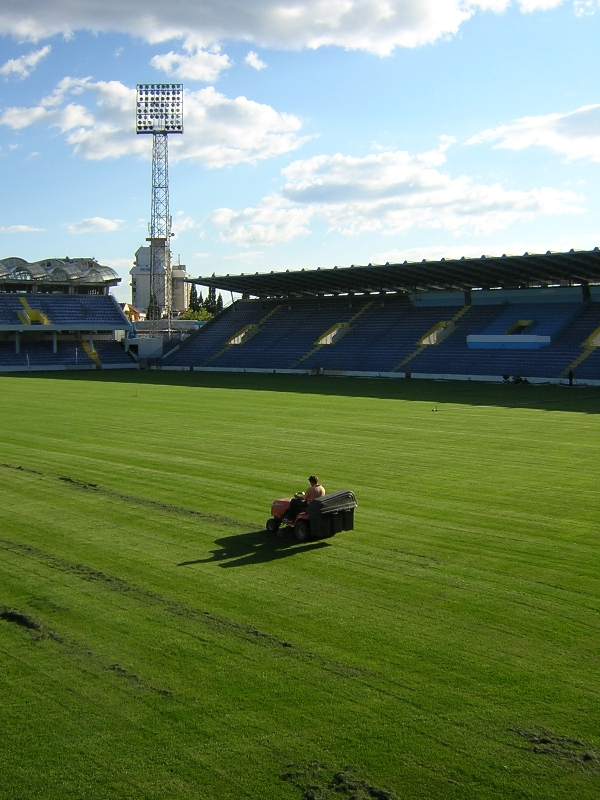
Podgorica City Stadium

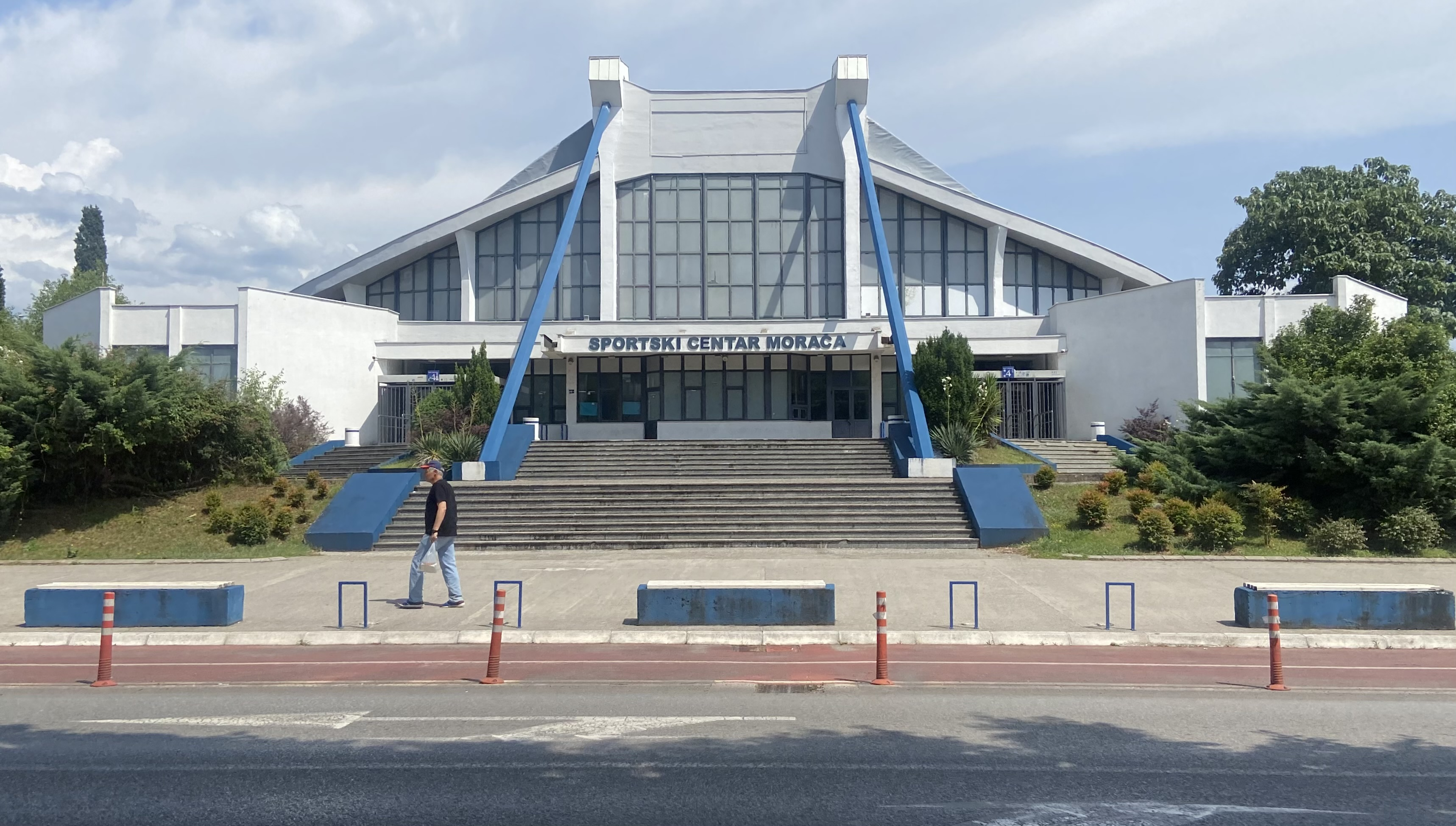
Morača Sports Center

== Cityscape ==
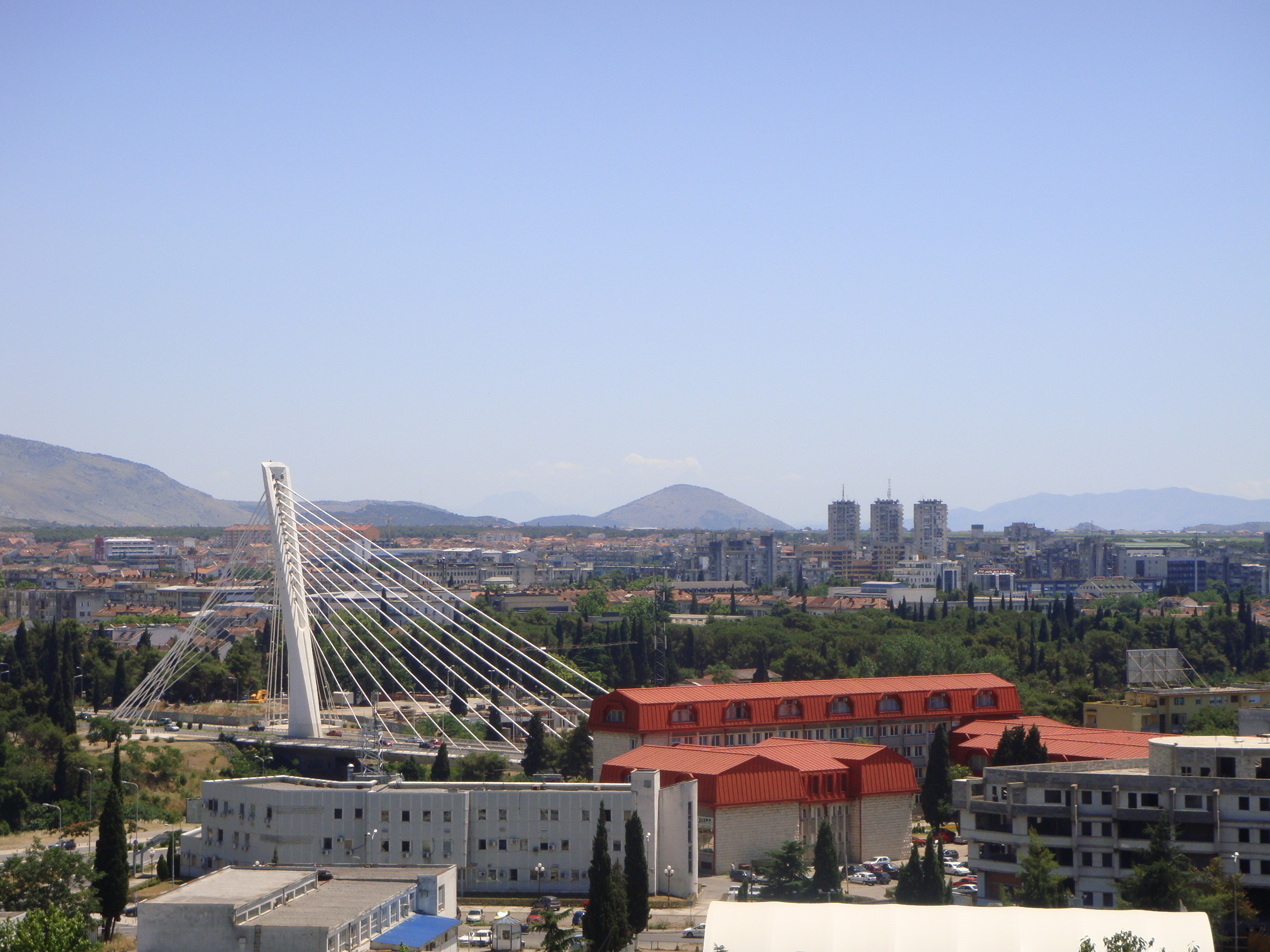
Panoramic view

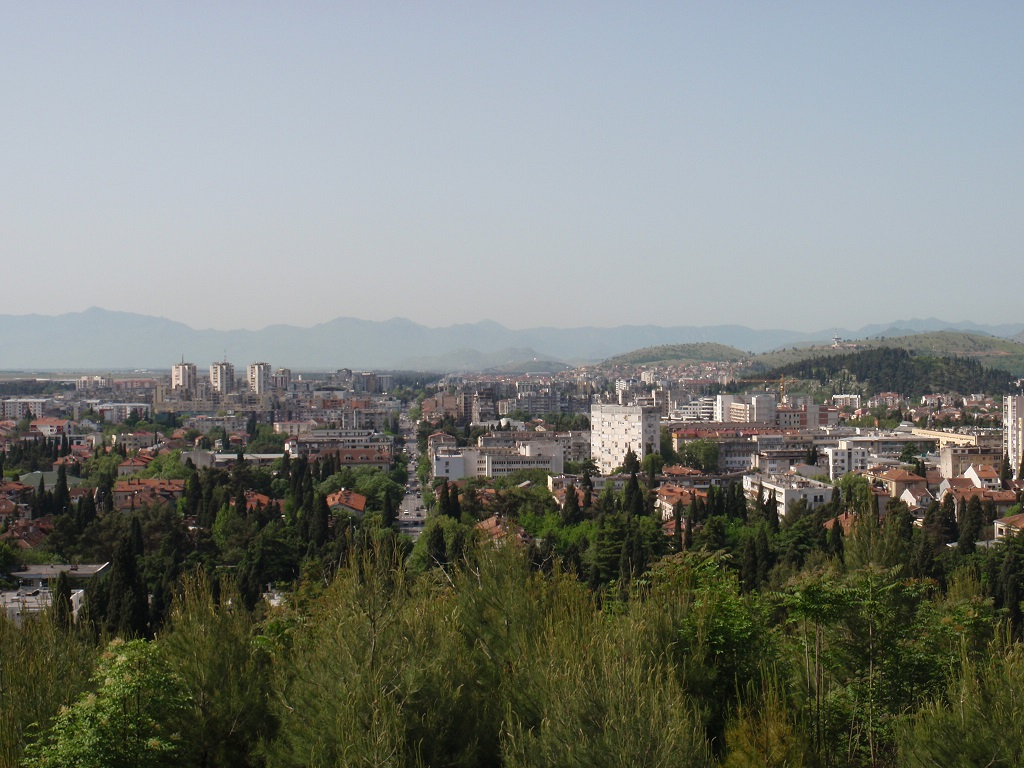
View from Gorica Hill

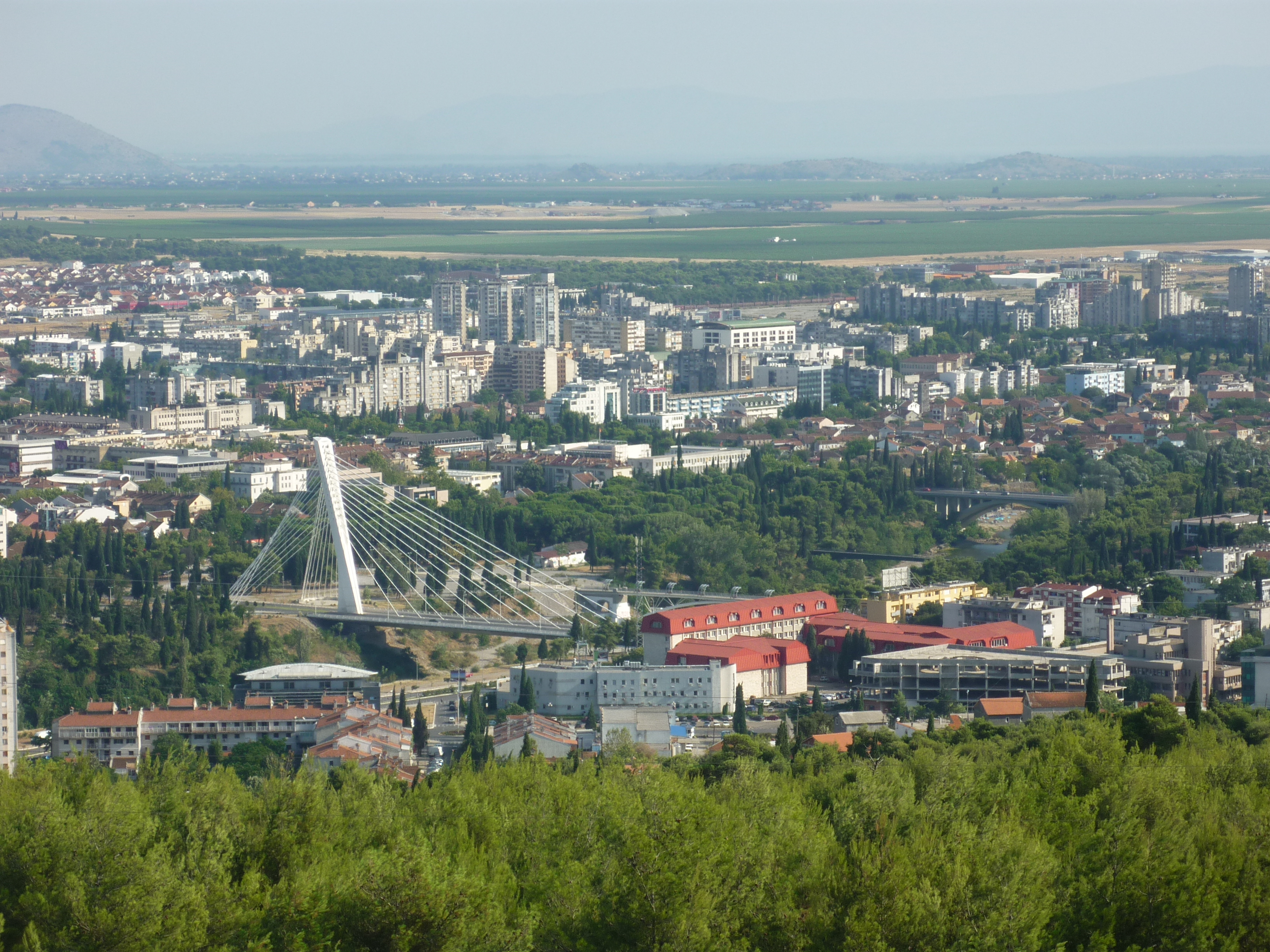
Cityscape

Turbulent history of Podgorica is reflected in its eclectic architectural heritage.

During the four centuries of Ottoman rule, Podgorica developed along the left bank of Ribnica river, in a manner typical of similar Ottoman settlements. This compact urban area was partly destroyed by post World War 2 reconstruction efforts, with Stara Varoš (Old Town) and Drač neighborhoods remaining as examples of Ottoman Podgorica - along with Clock Tower, two mosques, and a network of narrow winding streets.

As Podgorica was incorporated into Montenegro, its development shifted to the right bank of Ribnica, below the eponymous Gorica hill, where Nova Varoš (New Town) sprung up. Contrasting the Ottoman layout of Old Town, the new settlement was built according to European urban practices - wide streets of New Town were laid out in an orthogonal grid, along with a spacious city square in its center. Since its inception, Nova Varoš is considered the city center of Podgorica.

Podgorica was one of the most heavily bombed European cities in World War II, with severe destruction caused by more than 80 bombing raids. Following the Allied victory, Podgorica - renamed Titograd - became a capital of FR Montenegro within Yugoslav federation, which was followed by unprecedented growth of the city - post war population of 15.000 has grown by a factor of 7 in the following three decades.

Contemporary Podgorica is still mainly shaped by Yugoslav-era expansion - orthogonal street grid of Nova Varoš was extended outwards, and city quickly expanded along these "prongs", most dramatically to the right bank of Morača river; residential blocks were erected on a massive scale, mainly sporting basic designs typical for post-war Yugoslav period, but with some daring exceptions, such as Blok 5 development; with notable examples of brutalist architecture such as University of Montenegro building, Radio and Television of Montenegro building, Clinical center of Montenegro and Church of the Holy Heart of Jesus.

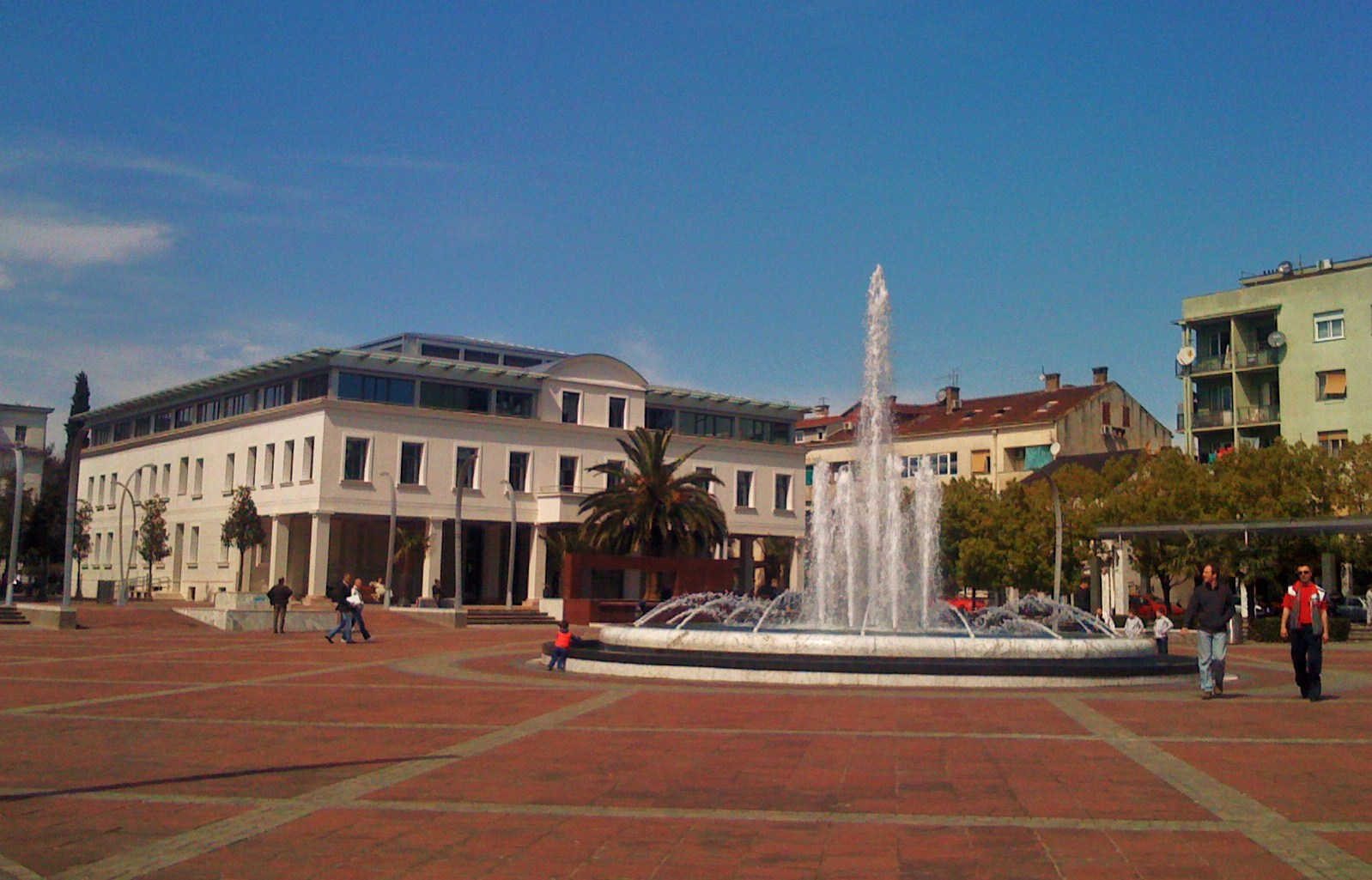
Independence square

Morača river

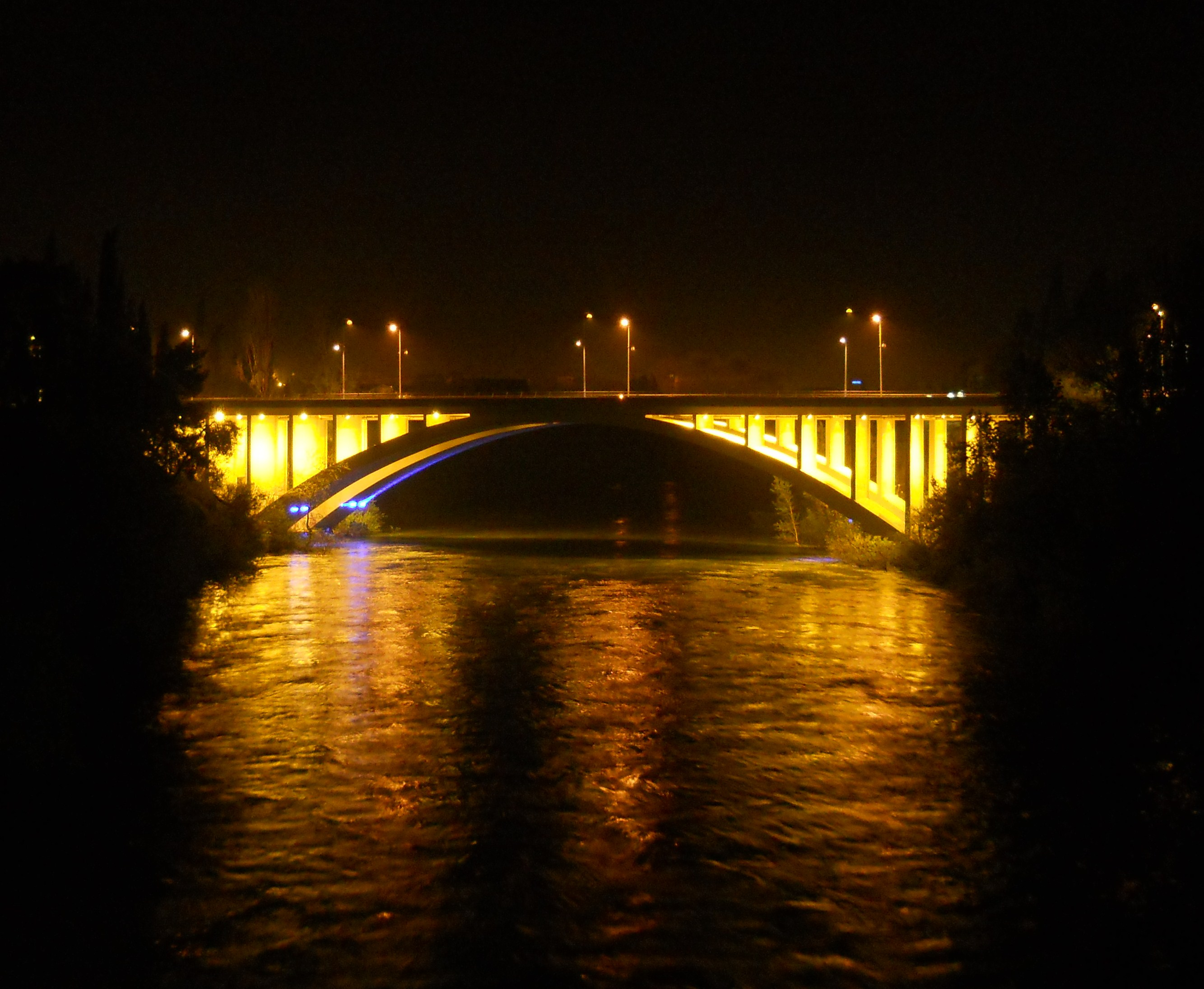
Blažo Jovanović Bridge over the Morača

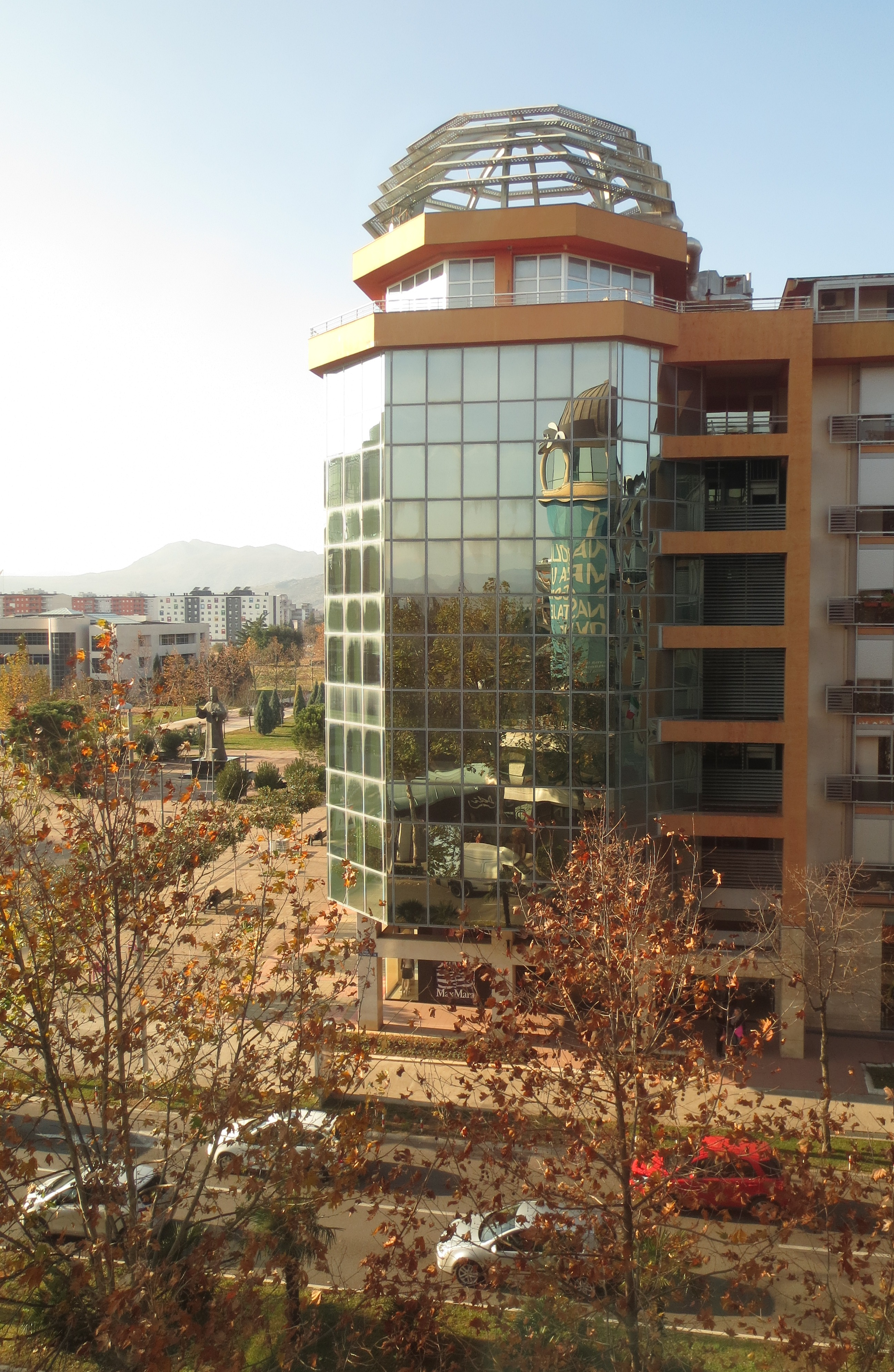
George Washington Street

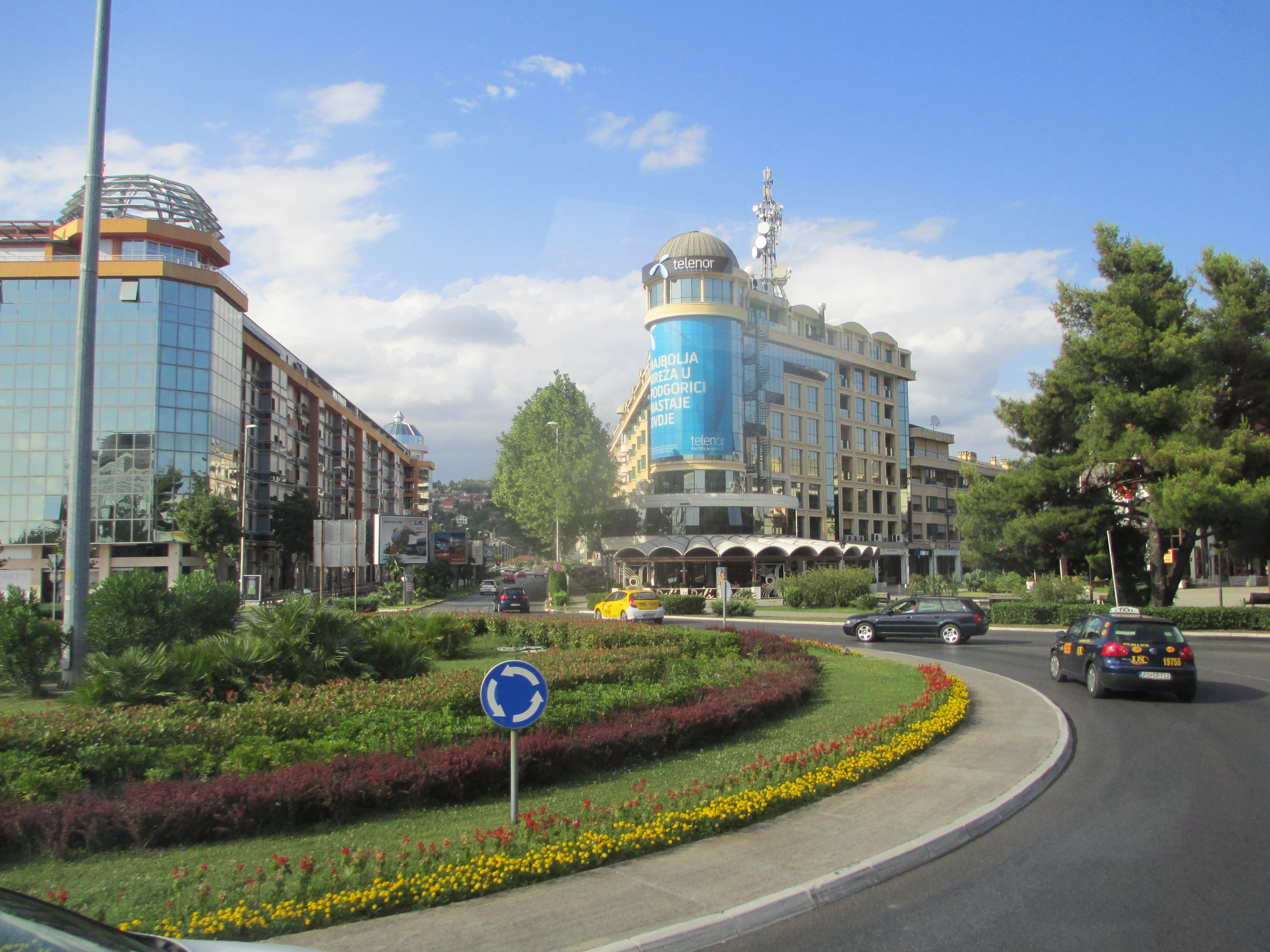
Telenor Center in Podgorica

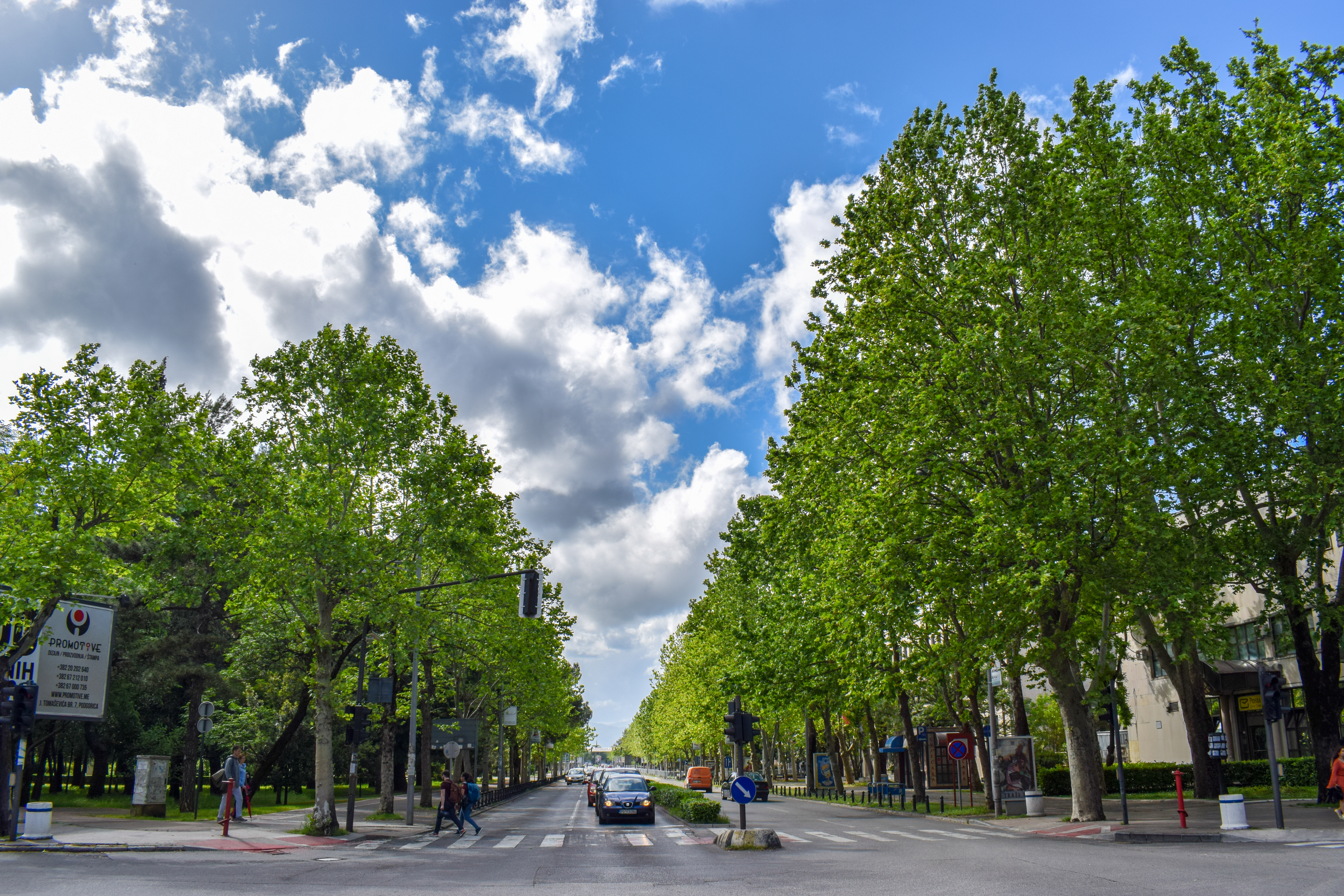
St Peter of Cetinje Boulevard

Millennium Bridge

Following the region-wide stagnation in 1990s and early 2000s, city has entered a new phase of development in mid-2000s - with Montenegro regaining independence, various public projects were initiated to make the city recognizable as a European capital - including the construction of Millennium bridge, reconstruction of main city square and numerous other public spaces. As capital of independent Montenegro, Podgorica is experiencing an ongoing construction boom, whereby demand for residential space is increasingly fueled by expatriate communities.

Notably, brownfield investment has transformed barren industrial zone along the Cetinjski put boulevard into a bustling urban area, rivalling the traditional city center as a hotspot of activity in the city.

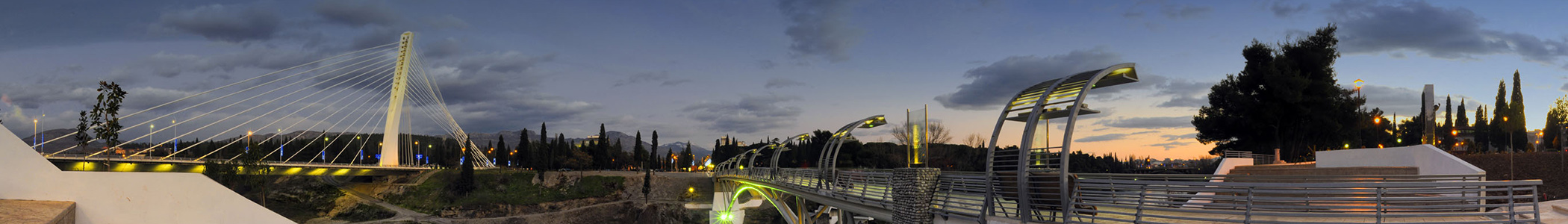
A panoramic view of the Moscow bridge (right) and the Millennium Bridge (left) (swipe left or right)

== Notable people ==
- Stefan Nemanja (born c. 1113), Serbian Grand Prince, saint and founder of the Nemanjić dynasty
- Miroslav Zavidović (born c. 1130), Serbian prince of Hum and the patron of Miroslav's Gospel
- Saint Sava (born c. 1169), Serbian Prince, bishop, saint and the first archbishop of the Serbian Church
- Božidar Vuković (born c. 1460), one of the first printers in Montenegro
- Ilarion Roganović (born 1828), Serbian Orthodox bishop and founder of the Red Cross of Montenegro
- Risto Stijović (born 1894), sculptor
- Vojo Stanić (born 1924), painter and sculptor
- Borislav Pekić (born 1930), writer
- Miloš Raonić (born 1990), retired tennis player

== Twin towns – sister cities ==
Podgorica is twinned with:

- Ankara, Turkey
- Bari, Italy
- Moscow, Russia
- Naousa, Greece
- Lugano, Switzerland
- Skopje, North Macedonia
- Sarajevo, Bosnia and Herzegovina
- Stockholm, Sweden
- Tirana, Albania

=== Partner cities ===
- Yerevan, Armenia

== See also ==
- Podgorica Capital City
- List of people from Podgorica
- Outline of Montenegro

== Notes ==
- Milosavljević, Olivera (2003). "Antibirokratska revolucija 1987–1989. godine". In Graovac, Igor; Fleck, Hans-Georg (eds.). Dijalog povjesničara – istoričara 8, Zadar (PDF) (in Serbian). Zagreb, Croatia: Political Science Research Centre Ltd. (PSRC) for Scientific Research Work / Zaklada Friedrich-Naumann. ISBN 953-6922-06-1. Archived from the original (PDF) on 28 September 2007.
- Morrison, Kenneth (2009). Nationalism, Identity and Statehood in Post-Yugoslav Montenegro. London: I.B. Tauris & Co Ltd. ISBN 978-1-84511-710-8.
- Vasić, Milan (2005). Naselja na Balkanskom Poluostrvu od XVI do XVIII Vijeka (in Serbian). Banja Luka: Narodna I Univerzitetska Biblioteka Republike Srpske. ISBN 99938-0-584-X.
- Andrijašević, Živko (2015). Istorija Crne Gore (in Serbian). Belgrade: Vukotić media d.o.o. ISBN 978-86-89613-35-3.
