= Inex-Adria Aviopromet Flight 450 =

1975 aviation accident

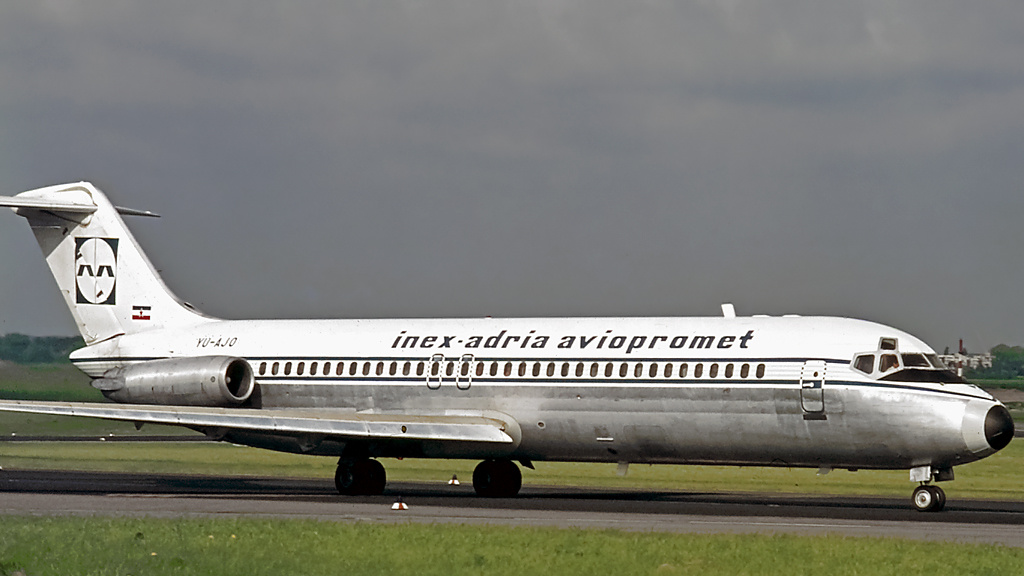
- YU-AJO, the DC-9 involved in the accident, photographed in 1973

Accident
- Date: 30 October 1975
- Summary: Controlled flight into terrain
- Site: Prague-Suchdol, Czechoslovakia; 50.1375°N 14.3900°E

Aircraft
- Aircraft type: McDonnell Douglas DC-9-32
- Operator: Inex-Adria Aviopromet
- IATA flight No.: JP450
- ICAO flight No.: ADR450
- Call sign: ADRIA 450
- Registration: YU-AJO
- Flight origin: Tivat Airport, Mrčevac, Montenegro
- Destination: Prague Ruzyně International Airport, Prague, Czechoslovakia
- Occupants: 120
- Passengers: 115
- Crew: 5
- Fatalities: 79
- Survivors: 41

Inex-Adria Aviopromet Flight 450, JP 450, was an international charter flight from Tivat in the Socialist Federal Republic of Yugoslavia to Prague, Czechoslovakia which crashed in the Prague suburb of Suchdol on 30 October 1975, at 09:20 AM. The McDonnell Douglas DC-9-32 with 115 passengers and 5 crew on board descended, under Instrument Meteorological Conditions (IMC), below defined Minimum Descent Altitude (MDA) during the final approach to Prague Ruzyně Airport RWY 25, entered a gorge above Vltava river, and was unable to outclimb the rising terrain. 75 of the 120 occupants died during the crash itself while 4 others died later in hospital. The accident remains the worst aviation disaster on the territory of today's Czech Republic.

== Aircraft ==
The aircraft involved was a McDonnell Douglas DC-9-32, registered as YU-AJO, which was manufactured by McDonnell Douglas in 1971. It was equipped with two Pratt & Whitney JT8D-9 engines.

== Accident ==
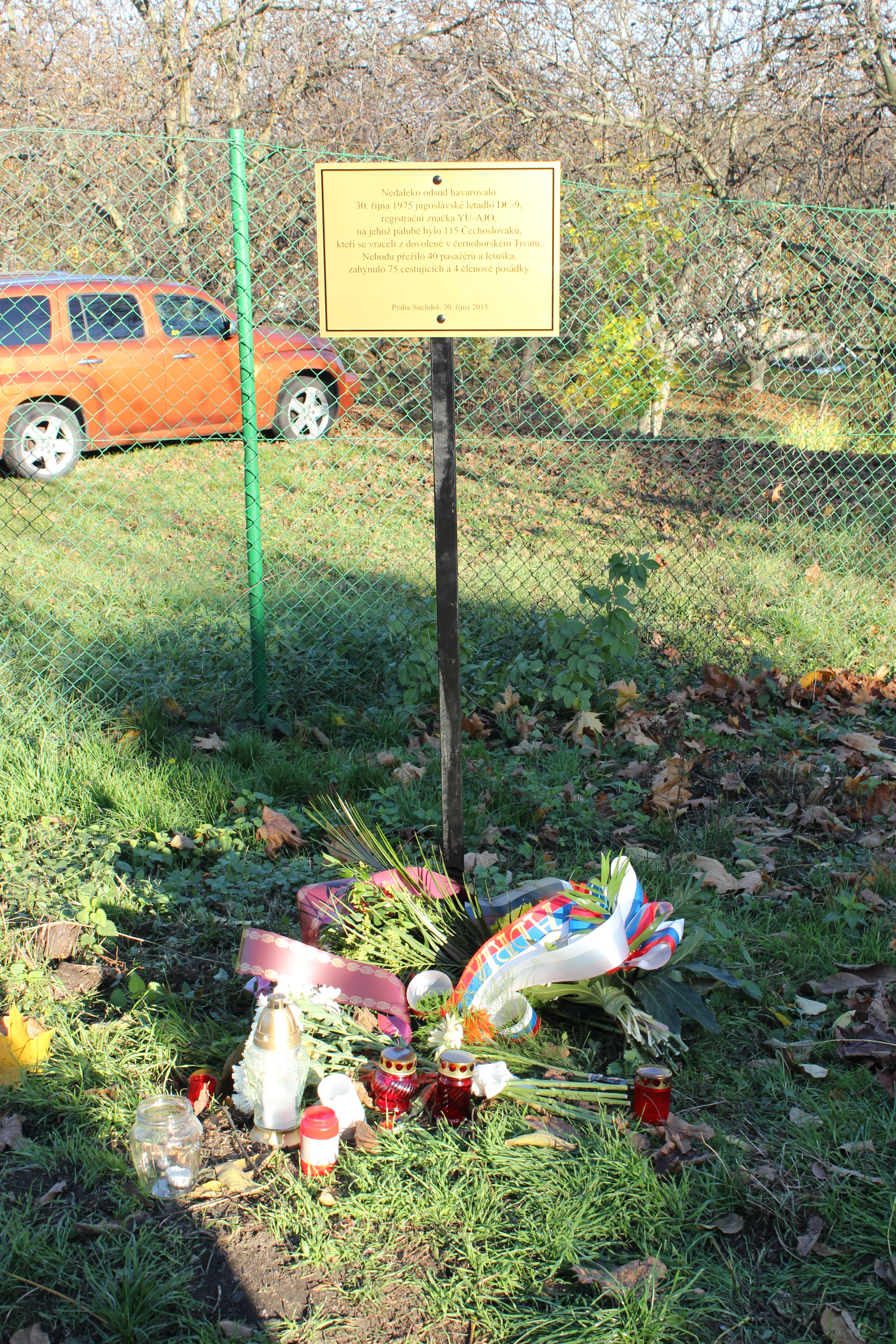
Memorial for the victims

The DC-9 was operated by Inex-Adria Aviopromet on a morning flight from Tivat to Prague with mostly Czechoslovak tourists returning home from vacations on the Adriatic sea. Captain Miodrag Marović (40) and First Officer Rade Popov (49) had an uneventful flight with clear weather, until they entered a published landing procedure above PR non-directional beacon (NDB). Czechoslovak ATC took over the aircraft at the border at 09:01. After identification, the crew asked for weather information. ATC responded that the total visibility in Prague is 1,500 metres (1.5 km; 0.93 mi) and on runway 25 (later known as runway 24) only 200 metres (660 ft). At the same time, ATC warned the crew that both the instrument landing system (ILS) for RWY 24 and the precision approach radar (PAR) were inoperative - "JP450, ILS and PAR are out of service on runway 25".

The pilot asked - "I understand, but what do we do now?". ATC responded - "You can continue to Prague or divert to another airport."

"Please wait" - the pilot replied.

After a while, the pilot continued - "So the RVR of 1,100 metres and the ILS and approach lights out of service?"

Since ATC never mentioned approach lights to be out of service, this message from the crew reveals that mental load started to build up caused by the uneasiness with the situation at the airport.

ATC responded - "The ILS is out of order. The approach lights and the runway lights are working. There are also beacons (NDBs) in operation."

Based on the information received, the crew decided to proceed according to the flight plan to Ruzyně Airport.

ATC contacted the crew again, while the aircraft was at an altitude of 1,500 metres (4,900 ft) approaching PG NDB (beacon) from the southeast, and instructed the crew to continue to PG NDB then to PR NDB, and make a published, standard turn. ATC approved descent to 550 metres (1,800 ft) (communication was in metres, not feet) and provided QFE pressure of 981. ATC's instruction was correctly read back by the JP450's crew. After passing overhead PR NDB the crew entered a published landing procedure. However, somewhere above the village of Vodochody the crew inadvertently missed the start of the published right turn and continued in a broader turn over the villages of Veliká Ves and Kojetice. After executing a wider-than-published right turn, the crew entered the final approach for runway 25 in IMC conditions (fog). Without the ILS and PAR support the crew was placed in a challenging and stressful situation during the final approach. Stress hormones level found, post mortem, in the body of the First Officer proves the emotional stress the crew was exposed to.

In addition, while executing a non-standard right turn the crew positioned the aircraft to the south (left) of the published glide path for the final approach. This horizontal deviation from the glide path continued to increase and at the place of the impact it was approximately 0.7 nmi (1.3 km; 0.81 mi).

During the turn, ATC again alerted the crew to an ILS outage, repeated the information about the QFE pressure at the airport, and required confirmation of the approach over two NDBs - "JP450, confirm approach over PR beacon and L beacon".

At 09:18 JP450 confirmed - "I understand, PR and L beacons".

This was the last transmission received from the JP450.

During this communication the crew continued to descend below the altitude approved by the ATC and deviate horizontally from the glide path, flying directly towards a Suchdol gorge, cut by the Vltava river, and well below the airport's elevation. Unfortunately, there are no publicly available Cockpit Voice Recorder (CVR) or Flight Data Recorder (FDR) recordings, to credibly reconstruct the cockpit communication and actions of the crew. Moreover, some sources cited the official report that the CVR stopped recording some 15 minutes before the crash due to a short magnetic tape, so there is no data regarding cockpit communication in this critical part of the flight. The crew, most probably, realized their mistake after establishing visual contact with the gorge. They selected full power, trying to climb above the rising ground of the river gorge, but it was too late. The aircraft first hit trees, 91 metres (299 ft) below the airport's elevation, then struck a building and crashed into the residential area, leaving a debris trace of 350 metres (1,150 ft; 380 yd). The time of the crash was 9:20 AM. Taking into account elevation of the first impact 91 metres below the airport elevation, and the last approved descent to 550 metres QFE (above the airport elevation), the crew descended 641 metres (2,103 ft) below the approved altitude.

At 09:21, when the crew did not report, ATC called them - "450, this is Prague. Confirm over PR beacon"

"JP450, can you hear me?"

"450, 450, do you hear?"

"450, I'm broadcasting blindly."

Response from JP450 never came.

Of 115 passengers and 5 crew on board, 40 passengers and 1 flight attendant survived the crash.

== Conclusions ==
There are no publicly available investigation reports, CVR transcripts or FDR data, without which the true causes of the crash can only be speculated. It is unknown:

- if the aircraft's navigational instruments and altimeters were functioning correctly and if the crew set them and used properly,
- if communications between the crew and ATC was clear, precise and without misunderstanding,
- the physical and emotional state of the crew and quality of the Crew Resource Management (CRM).

The crash ensued due to the crew descending the aircraft below published MDA and below altitude approved by the ATC. Precisely, taking into account the first point of impact, 91 metres below the airport elevation, and the last approved altitude of 550 metres QFE (above the airport elevation), the crew descended 641 metres (2100 ft) below the approved altitude.

Other contributing factors to the crash are:

- flying the aircraft approx. 0.7 nautical miles (1.3 Km) to the left of the published glide path over PR and L NDBs, bringing it directly into the river gorge, which they did not succeed to out-climb,
- inoperative airport's ILS and PAR systems,
- poor visibility,
- spatial disorientation of the crew.

Taking into account all known facts, this crash can be classified as a Controlled Flight Into Terrain (CFIT) type of accident.

=== Unsupported theories on causes of the crash ===
It has never been determined as to how the aircraft descended 641 metres lower than the ATC approved, and there were several widespread theories regarding the accident, with most of them being misguided, according to experts.

One of them claimed that the crew did not set their altimeters correctly in accordance with the ATC's instruction. Crash investigation proved that the altimeters were set correctly, since the altimeter found at the crash scene had QFE pressure set at 981.

The second theory claimed the possibility that the crew confused altitude in metres for altitude in feet. However, the crew confirmed approved altitude several times, in metres.

The inhabitants of Suchdol promoted another theory, based on alleged testimonies of survivors, that the crew mistakenly took illuminated railway track and road, under the Suchdol gorge, for the airport. They based this theory on statements that passengers near the cockpit, shortly before the impact, had heard the pilot announcing visual contact with the runway and starting to land. This theory is questionable, though spatial disorientation was a factor contributing to the crash, since an experienced crew, flying under IMC, would have been restrained from looking out from the cockpit (Visual Flight Rules flight) and had to rely solely on their instruments (Instrument Flight Rules flight). The ILS and PAR were inoperative, it can happen that the crew was intensively looking out for a visual contact and thus failed to monitor the aircraft's altimeters and correlate read altitude to the ATC's instruction and airport's elevation.

The official report states that, during the inspection of the cockpit wreckage, it was found that "Both radio compasses on board the aircraft were set to only one beacon - PR". This fact does not explain the non-compliance with the altitude, but explains the horizontal deviation from the glide path, and testifies about the crew's acts and cooperation before the crash. On a non-precision approach, when using two beacons, the crew should have set both frequencies, so that the correct course could be followed. Returning to the previous consideration that the crew was under stress and overwhelmed mentally due to inoperative ILS and PAR, it is highly likely that they were rather focused on looking for an outside visual contact than on instruments. Ladislav Keller, then Czechoslovak civil pilot and air accident expert, supported the claim stating that the insufficient setting of the radio compasses indicated that the crew did not prepare well for landing, did not cooperate properly, and failed to monitor the instruments during the final approach.

Keller said: "If the crew stopped descending at decision height, there would probably be no accident because the plane would fly about 90 metres above the runway threshold. However, the crew descended to an altitude of 100 metres below the runway threshold elevation. This indicates that the crew was totally disoriented, did not know their position and did not monitor the altimeter at all. There is a presumption that the pilot was not watching the instruments and looking out of the cockpit."

== See also ==
- 1976 Zagreb mid-air collision
- Inex-Adria Aviopromet Flight 1308
- Korean Air Flight 801
- Trigana Air Flight 267
