= Kojetice =

Kojetice may refer to places in the Czech Republic:

- Kojetice (Mělník District), a municipality and village in the Central Bohemian Region
- Kojetice (Třebíč District), a municipality and village in the Vysočina Region
- Kojetice, a village and part of Ústí nad Labem in the Ústí nad Labem Region
