= Montenegro Airlines =

Flag carrier of Montenegro (1994–2020)

IATA	ICAO	Call sign
YM	MGX	MONTENEGRO
- Founded: 24 October 1994
- Ceased operations: 26 December 2020
- Hubs: Podgorica Airport
- Secondary hubs: Tivat Airport
- Frequent-flyer program: Vision Team
- Fleet size: 4
- Destinations: 21
- Headquarters: Podgorica, Montenegro
- Key people: Živko Banjević, CEO
- Net income: ▼€-8.0 million (2019)
- Website: montenegroairlines.com

Montenegro Airlines a.d. (Montenegrin: Montenegro erlajns) was the flag carrier of Montenegro, headquartered in Podgorica. It operated scheduled and charter services throughout Europe from its hub at Podgorica Airport with a second base maintained at Tivat Airport. The airline was liquidated from 26 December 2020 due to accumulating heavy losses during the COVID-19 pandemic.

In February 2021, the government of Montenegro launched a new flag carrier, Air Montenegro.

== History ==
=== Foundation ===
The airline was founded on 24 October 1994, by the government of the Montenegro as Montenegro Airlines. The first aircraft, a Fokker 28 Mk4000 (nicknamed "Lovćen"), was purchased almost two years later in 1996. The first commercial flight took place on 7 May 1997, at exactly 10:30 between Podgorica and Bari, Italy.

In April 2000, the company became member of the International Air Transport Association (IATA). In June 2000, the first of five Fokker 100 aircraft were delivered to the company at Podgorica Airport. The airline joined Amadeus CRS on 5 March 2003. In 2004, Montenegro Airlines pilots were the first in the region to be granted the IIIA certificate. On 2 July of the same year, the airline carried its millionth passenger. On 23 July 2007, Montenegro Airlines ordered 2 Embraer 195 in order to grow its fleet and destination network. The aircraft being leased from GECAS for a period of 8 years. The first of the two Embraer E-195s arrived at Podgorica Airport on 5 June 2008. The delivery of the first Embraer was followed by introduction of regular flights to London-Gatwick and Milan-Malpensa International Airport.

On 17 April 2009, El Al and Montenegro Airlines issued a joint statement reiterating El Al's keen interest in buying 30% of the stock, but the plan failed. The airline remains a government-owned company and enjoys financial and protectionist support from the government.

=== Master Airways ===
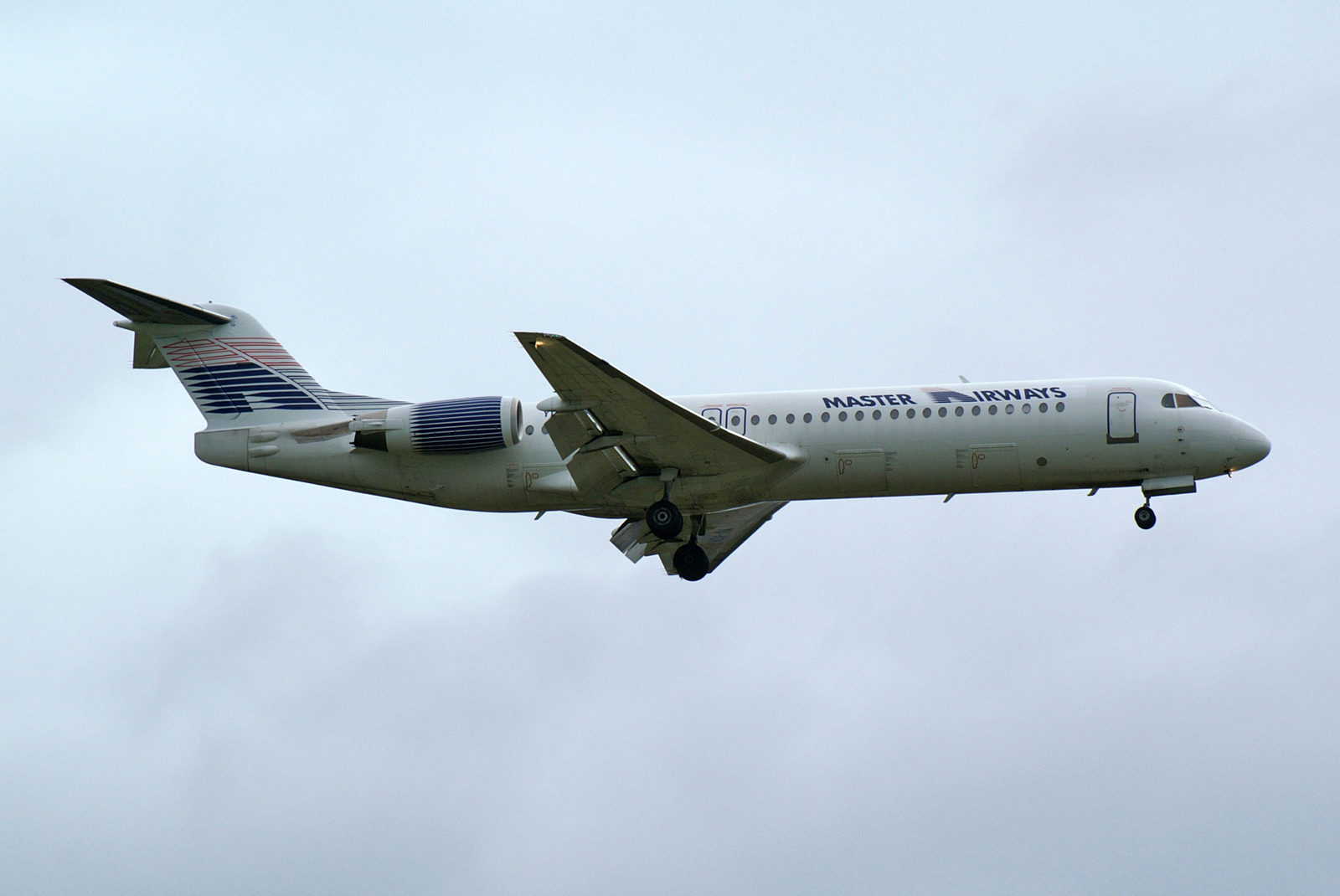
Master Airways Fokker 100 in Zürich in April 2006.

After the Montenegrin independence referendum, Serbia became an international market for Montenegrin companies. Montenegro Airlines had to cease international flights from Serbia to countries other than Montenegro, thus losing the profitable Niš - Zurich line, due to lack of Seventh Freedom policy. In an effort to circumvent this, Montenegro Airlines tried to re-register as a separate airline in Serbia returning its name to Master Airways, but it was denied an operating license allegedly due to Serbian Government protectionist policies.

=== Development since 2010 ===
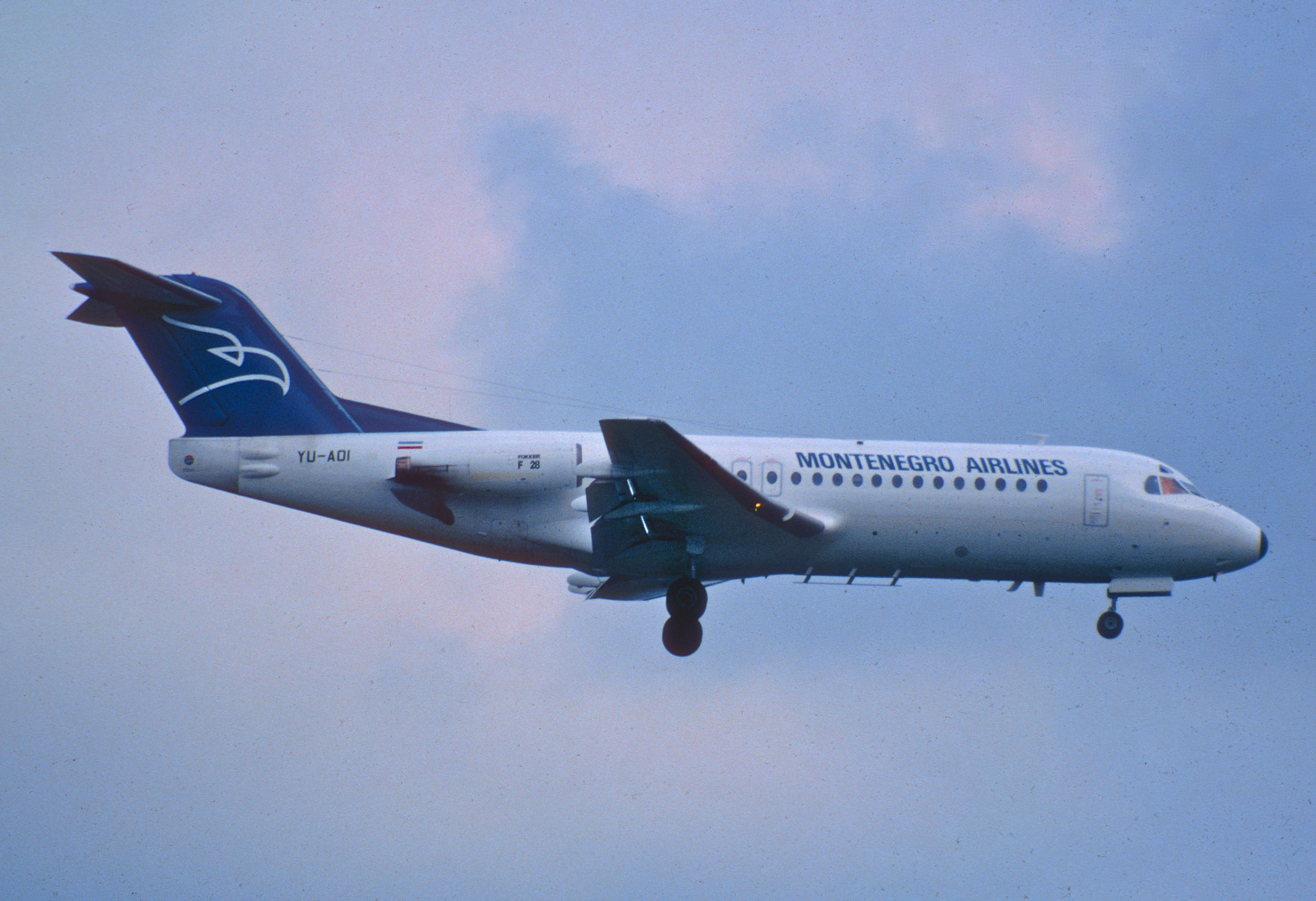
A former Montenegro Airlines Fokker F-28 1998 in Zürich

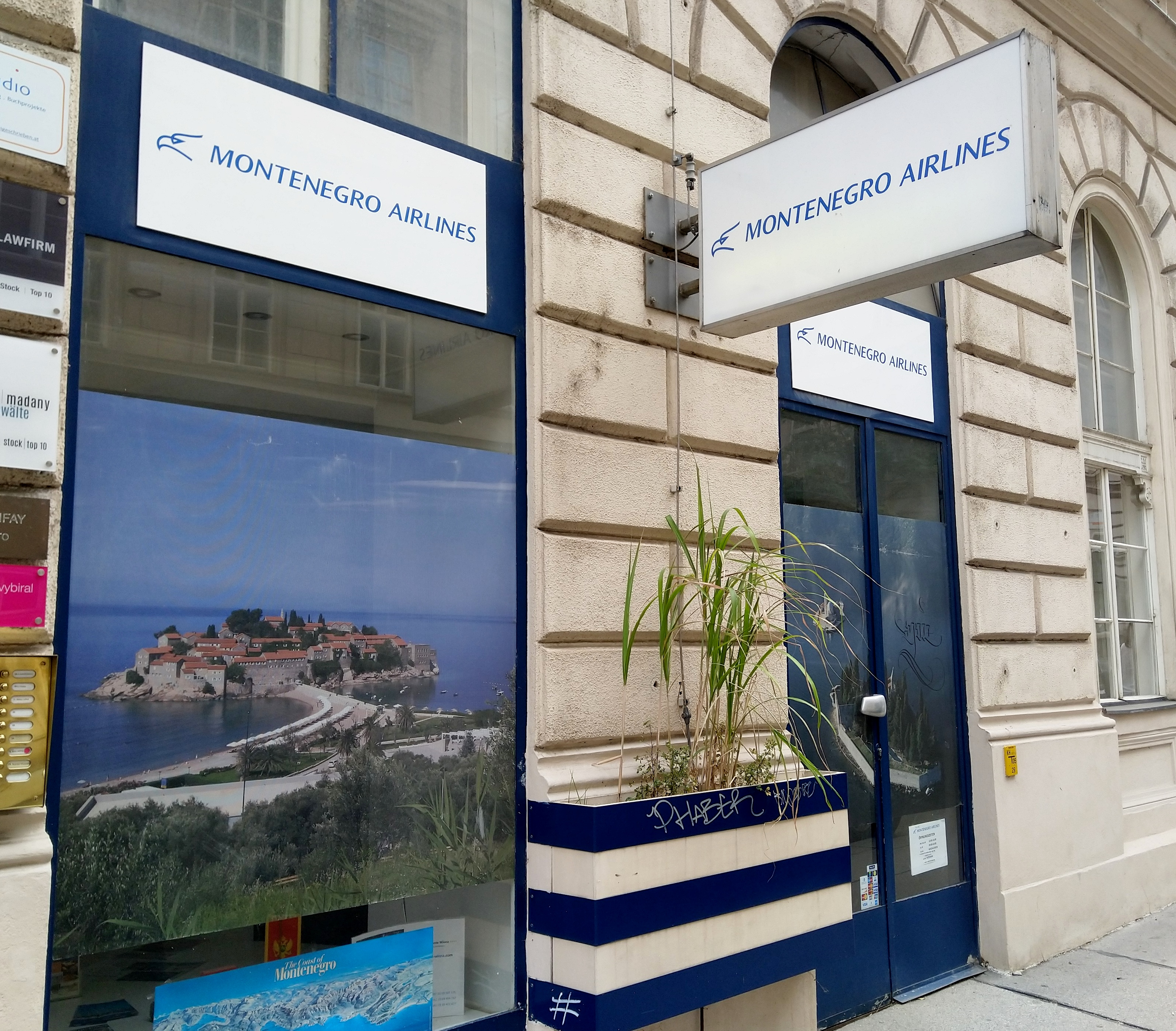
Montenegro Airlines office in Vienna in July 2018.

After the arrival of the airline's first pair of Embraer E-195s, Montenegro Airlines requested Embraer to change the remaining backlog order to the E-175. However, the third E-195 was delivered anyway, and thus the fourth remaining order was to be an E-175. On 6 July 2012, local media cited that Montenegro Airlines has yet again changed the fourth order, this time requesting an E-190LR model. The aircraft was delivered in May 2014. In November 2014, Montenegro Airlines put both its Fokker 100s up for sale. However, by June 2015 no buyer has been found and the aircraft are likely to be scrapped.

=== Liquidation and the new company ===
In August 2016, it was reported that accounts belonging to Montenegro Airlines had been frozen after the airline failed to comply with a court ruling regarding the payment of debts to the operator of the country's airports. Montenegro Airlines owed the company more than US$15 million.

In December 2020, the Government of Montenegro announced the shutdown and liquidation of the company in the forthcoming weeks stating mismanagement and accumulating losses for several years. Shortly after, it has been announced that the airline will suspend all flights from 26 December 2020 marking the end of its operations.

On 29 December 2020, it was announced by Minister Mladen Bojanić that the Montenegro Airlines would be reorganized and replaced with a new company the To Montenegro (2 Montenegro), as the new Montenegrin flag carrier airline.

In late 2020 it was uncovered that a number of individuals close to the ruling DPS party, such as controversial religious leader Miraš Dedeić, were given free tickets or significant discount for the flights of the Montenegro Airlines.

In April 2021, it was reported the Montenegrin government made Air Montenegro the official name for the ToMontenegro project and that the airline would start up using two of Montenegro Airlines' former Embraer-195 aircraft.

In June 2021, Montenegro Airlines' former directors, pilots, flight crew and other employees reported to the Bankruptcy Administration claims of US$205 million for salaries, taxes, contributions, per diems and fees.

== Corporate affairs ==
=== Business trends ===
The available business and operating results of Montenegro Airlines are (as at year ending 31 December):

	2015	2016	2017	2018	2019
Turnover (€ m)	67.7	65.4	67.5	79.5	80.7
Net profit/loss (€ m)	-10.4	-11.5	-15.9	-2.0	-8.0
Number of employees (at year end)					372
Number of passengers (000s)	580	581	569	644	657
Passenger load factor (%)			68	70	71
Number of aircraft (during year)	6	6	5	6	6
Notes/sources					

== Destinations ==
At the time of closure, Montenegro Airlines served 18 destinations in Denmark, France, Germany, Italy, Russia, Austria, Slovenia, Serbia, Switzerland and the United Kingdom.

=== Codeshare agreements ===
Montenegro Airlines maintained codeshare agreements with the following airlines:

- Air Serbia
- Etihad Airways
- S7 Airlines

== Fleet ==
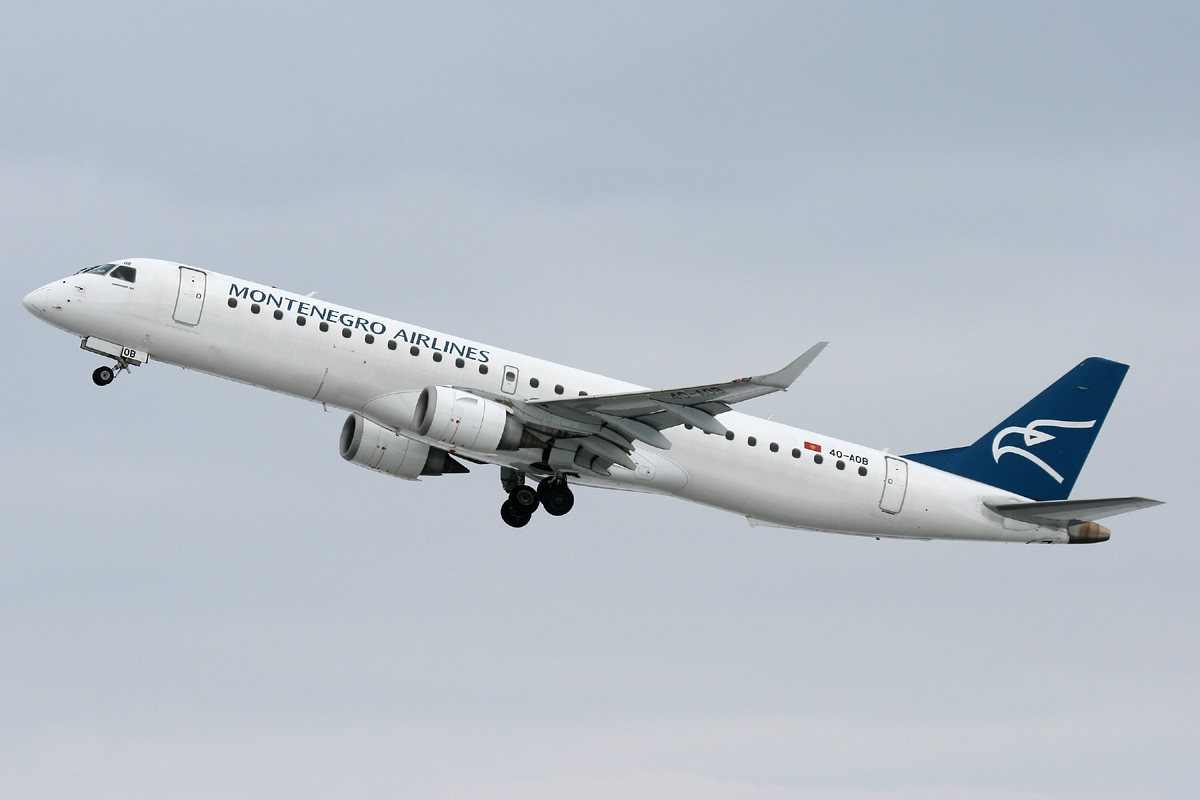
Montenegro Airlines Embraer 195

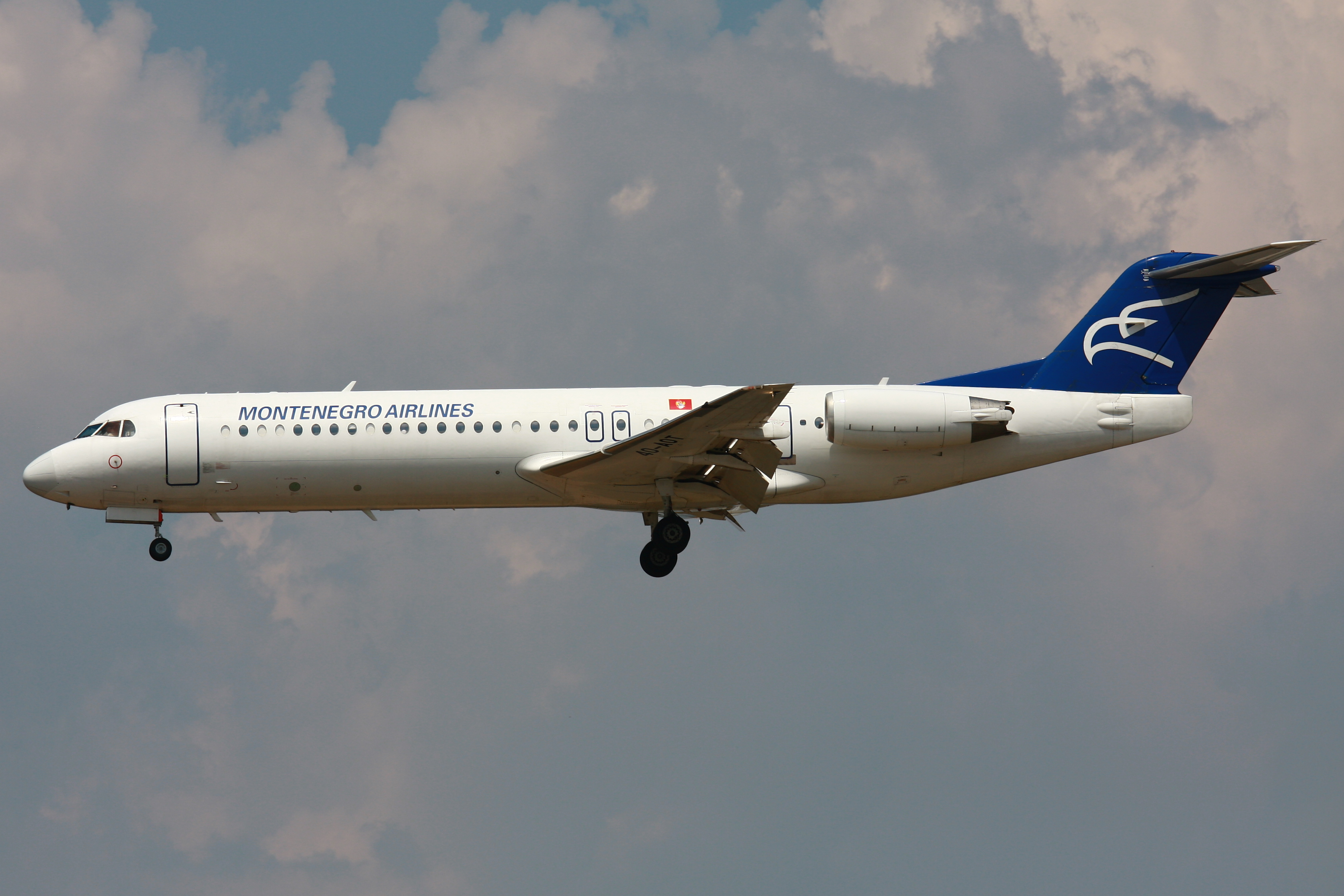
Montenegro Airlines Fokker 100

=== Final fleet ===
At the time of closure, Montenegro Airlines fleet consisted of the following aircraft:

Montenegro Airlines fleet
Aircraft	In Service	Orders	Passengers		Notes
Aircraft	In Service	Orders	Y	Total	Notes
Embraer 195	3	0	116	116	Two aircraft were to be added by summer of 2020. Two aircraft now flying for Air Montenegro.
Fokker 100	1	—	102	102	Was to be phased out by the end of 2020.
Total	4	0	—		

=== Historical fleet ===
The airline previously operated the following aircraft:

Montenegro Airlines fleet
Aircraft	Total	Introduced	Retired	Notes
Boeing 737-300	1	2019	2019	returned to lessor Blue Air
Boeing 737-500	1	2018	2018	returned to lessor Air X Charter
Embraer 190	1	2014	2017	returned to lessor TUI fly Belgium
Fokker F-28	2	1996	2000	
Fokker 100	5	2000	2020	

== Incidents and accidents ==
- On 25 January 2005 at about 11 p.m., a Montenegro Airlines Fokker 100 (YU-AOM) ran off the side of the runway during a night landing in snowy conditions at Podgorica. The nosegear collapsed and the airplane skidded for about 700 meters before coming to rest. Two passengers, the pilot, and the co-pilot sustained minor injuries.
- On 7 January 2008, at about 9:30 pm, a Montenegro Airlines Fokker 100 (4O-AOK) was shot at while landing at Podgorica Airport. A routine inspection of the aircraft led to the discovery of a bullet hole in the aircraft's tail. The aircraft was carrying 20 passengers, but no one was injured. The reason for the incident is unknown; however, reports indicate that it may have been an inadvertent result of guns being fired during celebrations for Orthodox Christmas.
