= Václav Havel Airport Prague =

Airport serving Prague, Czech Republic

Václav Havel Airport Prague Letiště Václava Havla Praha

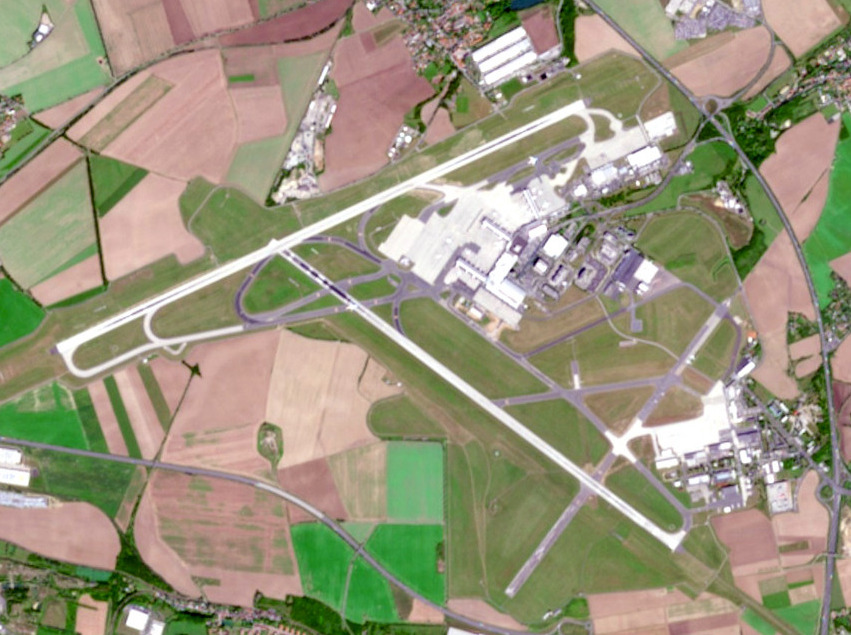
- Satellite view of the airport in 2022
- IATA: PRG; ICAO: LKPR

Summary
- Airport type: Public
- Owner: Ministry of Finance
- Operator: Letiště Praha, Ltd.
- Serves: Prague
- Location: Ruzyně
- Opened: 5 April 1937; 89 years ago
- Hub for: Smartwings
- Operating base for: Eurowings; Ryanair
- Time zone: CET (UTC+01:00)
  - Summer (DST): CEST (UTC+02:00)
- Elevation AMSL: 1,234 ft (376 m)
- Coordinates: 50.1018°N 14.2632°E
- Website: prg.aero

Map
- Location within Prague Location within Czech Republic

Runways
Direction	Length		Surface
Direction	m	ft	Surface
06/24	3,715	12,188	Concrete
12/30	3,250	10,663	Concrete

Helipads
Number	Length		Surface
Number	m	ft	Surface
FATO 1	29	95	Asphalt/grass
FATO 2	38	125	Asphalt/grass

Statistics (2025)
- Passengers: 17,750,528 ▲8.5%
- Cargo: 96,481 t ▲48%
- Aircraft movements: 140,545 ▲7%
- Source: Czech AIP at the Air Navigation Services of the Czech Republic (ANS CR)

Václav Havel Airport Prague (Czech: Letiště Václava Havla Praha [ˈlɛcɪʃcɛ ˈvaːt͡slava ˈɦavla ˈpraɦa]; IATA: PRG, ICAO: LKPR), formerly Prague Ruzyně International Airport (Mezinárodní letiště Praha-Ruzyně [ˈmɛzɪnaːrodɲiː ˈlɛcɪʃcɛ ˈpraɦa ˈruzɪɲɛ]), is an international airport of Prague, the capital of the Czech Republic. Its official name according to the Air Navigation Services of the Czech Republic is Praha/Ruzyně Airport.

The airport was founded in 1937 when it replaced the Kbely Airport (founded in 1918) as the city's principal airport. It was reconstructed and extended in 1956, 1968, 1997, and 2006. In 2012, it was renamed after the last president of Czechoslovakia and the first president of the Czech Republic, Václav Havel. It is located at the edge of the Prague-Ruzyně area, next to Kněževes municipality, 12 km (7 mi) west of the centre of Prague and 12 km (7 mi) southeast of the city of Kladno.

Prague airport served as a hub for Czech Airlines until it ceased operations in late 2024 and it serves as a hub for Smartwings, and as an operating base for Ryanair and Eurowings. The airport served almost 17.8 million passengers in 2025.

== History ==
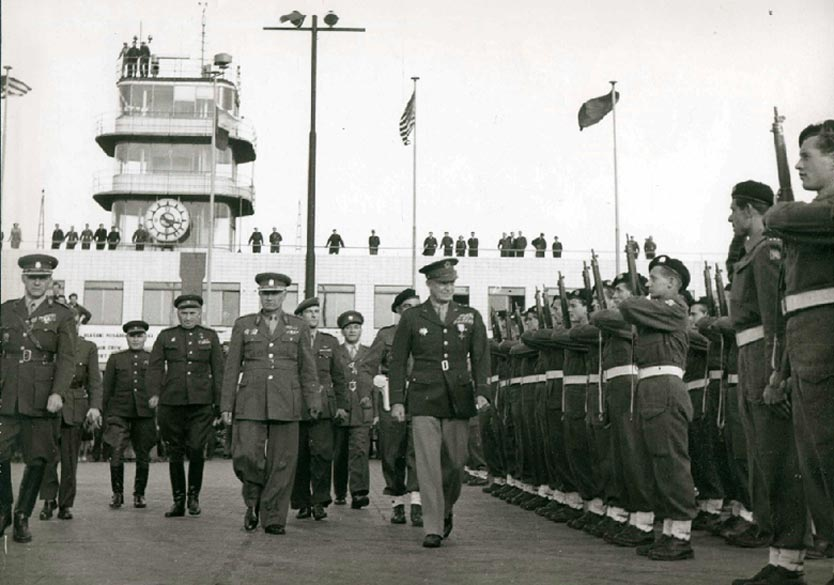
Old control tower (front view) during the visit of Dwight D. Eisenhower to Prague on 12 October 1945

=== Foundation and early years ===
Prague–Ruzyně Airport began operations on 5 April 1937, but Czechoslovak civil aviation history started at the military airport in Prague–Kbely in 1919. The Prague Aviation Museum is now found at Kbely Airport.

Due to the insufficient capacity of Kbely Airport by the mid-1930s, the government decided to develop a new state civil airport in Ruzyně. Among the major awards Prague Ruzyně Airport has received is the Diploma and Gold Medal, granted in 1937 at the occasion of the International Art and Technical Exhibition in Paris (Exposition Internationale des Arts et Techniques dans la Vie Moderne, also known as Paris 1937 World's Fair) for the technical conception of the central airport, primarily the architecture of the check-in building (nowadays known as Terminal 4) designed by architect Adolf Benš.

In one of the most dramatic moments in its history, the airport was seized by Soviet paratroopers on the night of 20–21 August 1968, who then facilitated the landing of Soviet troops and transports for the invasion of Czechoslovakia.

=== Development since 2000 ===
An online petition organised by a Slovak film director, Fero Fenič, calling on the government and the Parliament to rename Prague Ruzyně Airport to Václav Havel International Airport attracted – in just one week after 20 December 2011—the support of over 65,000 signatories both within and outside the Czech Republic. A rendition of the airport with the proposed Václav Havel name in the form of his signature followed by his typical heart symbol suffix was included in the blog's article in support of renaming of the airport. This name change took place on 5 October 2012 on what would have been Havel's 76th birthday. The PRG name of the airport for IATA and ICAO will remain the same.

The main runway 06/24 was reconstructed from 2012 to 2013 due to poor technical conditions. During reconstruction, runway 12/30 was the only usable runway as runway 04/22 is closed permanently. The runway reconstruction was originally planned for three stages. The first stage in 2012, the second stage in 2013 and the last stage in 2014. Runway 12/30 (which would be used during the reconstruction of the main runway) is not equipped for low visibility landings as it offers only ILS CAT I landings. In addition, the approach path of runway 12/30 goes above high-density population areas (such as Prague 6 and Kladno). Therefore, the second and the third stage of the runway reconstruction had to be merged so the works could be finished in 2013.

== Expansion plans ==
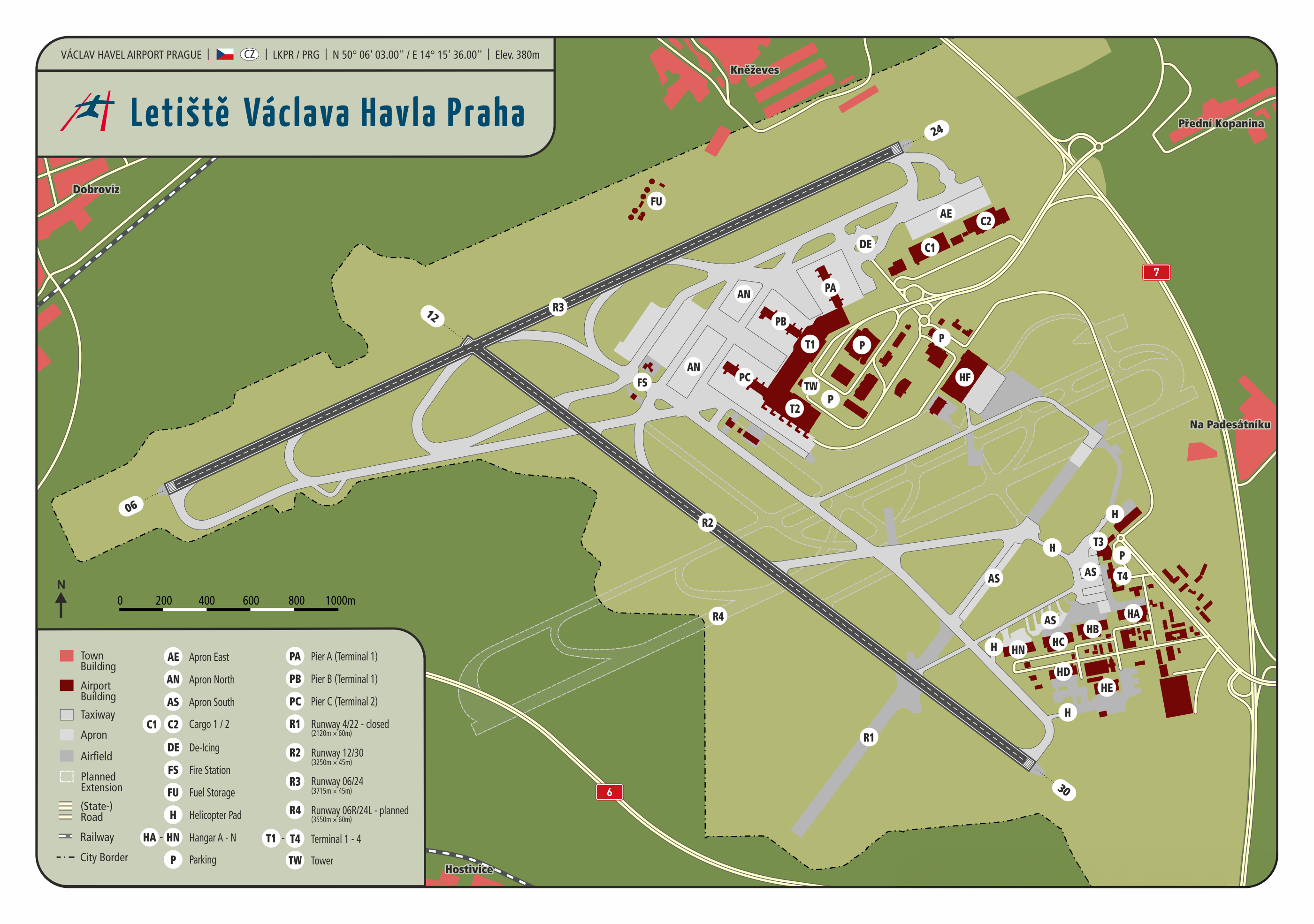
Airport map

=== Terminal expansion ===
An expansion of the existing terminals is scheduled to start construction sometime during the year 2027 or 2028. A new concourse is supposed to be built to expand the existing Terminal 2 and it will be south of the mentioned terminal and north of the new runway (see "New runway"). It will accommodate both non-Schengen (departure and arrival) and Schengen flights (arrival only). It will contain 8 jetway gates and 10 non-Schengen bus gates. An extension of the check-in hall at Terminal 1 is also going to be made. Modifications will be made to the existing concourses (including concourses A and B). Terminal 1 will be used only for Schengen flights and Terminal 2 will be used for both Schengen and non-Schengen flights. In addition, one Schengen bus gate will be added to concourse A. This project is supposed to be completed by 2033.

=== Railway connection ===
The construction of a railway connection between airport and Prague city centre Masarykovo train station is also in the planning stage. The track will be served by express trains with special fares, connecting the airport non-stop with the city centre in 25 minutes, and local trains fully integrated into Prague integrated transit system.

The train track will also connect the airport to the city of Kladno, Veleslavín, Dejvice, Výstaviště and Bubny railway stations. As of 2025, it was said that the construction will start in 2027 and the railway will open in 2030.

== Infrastructure ==
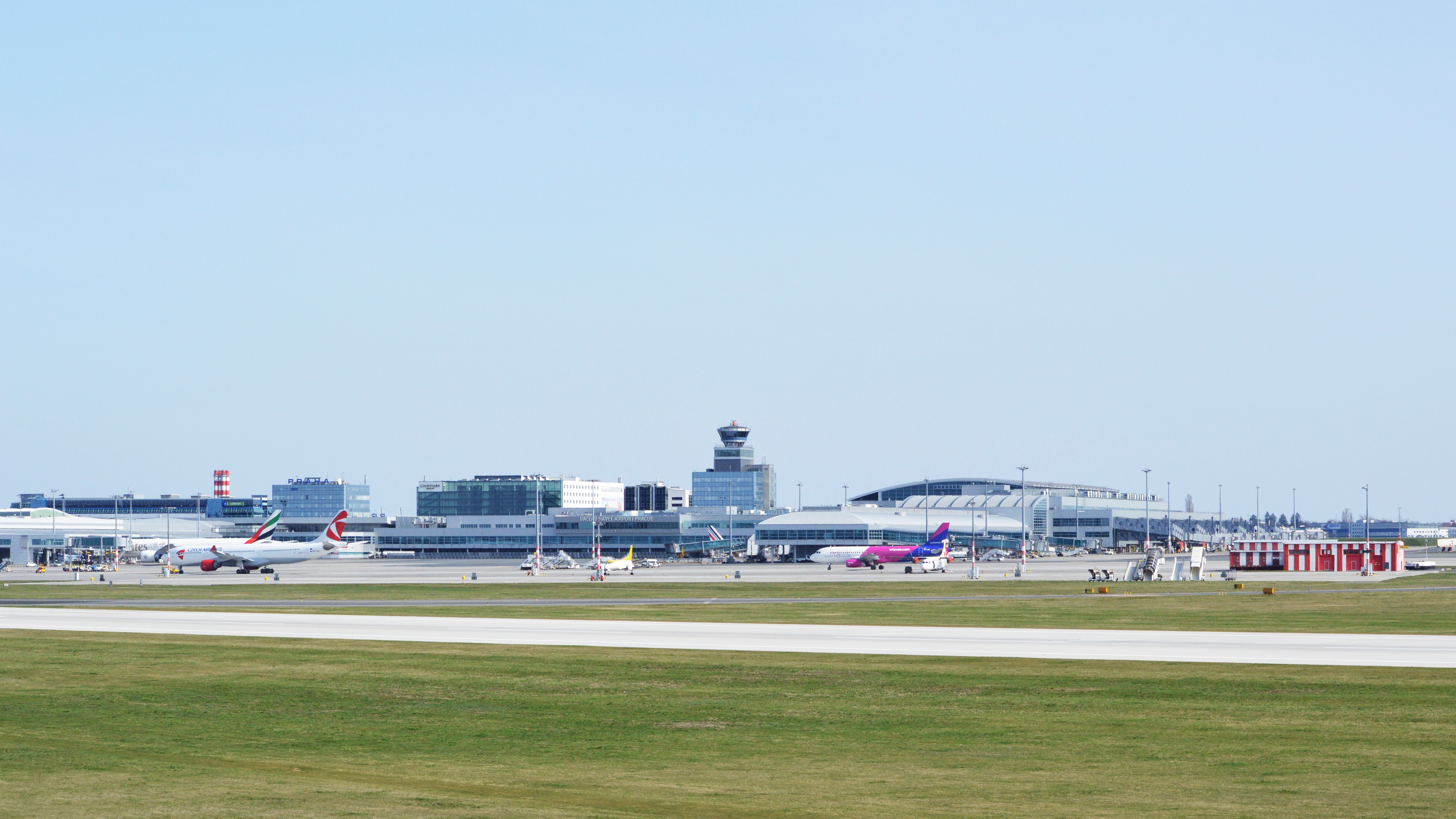
View on pier B (Terminal 1) and C (Terminal 2)

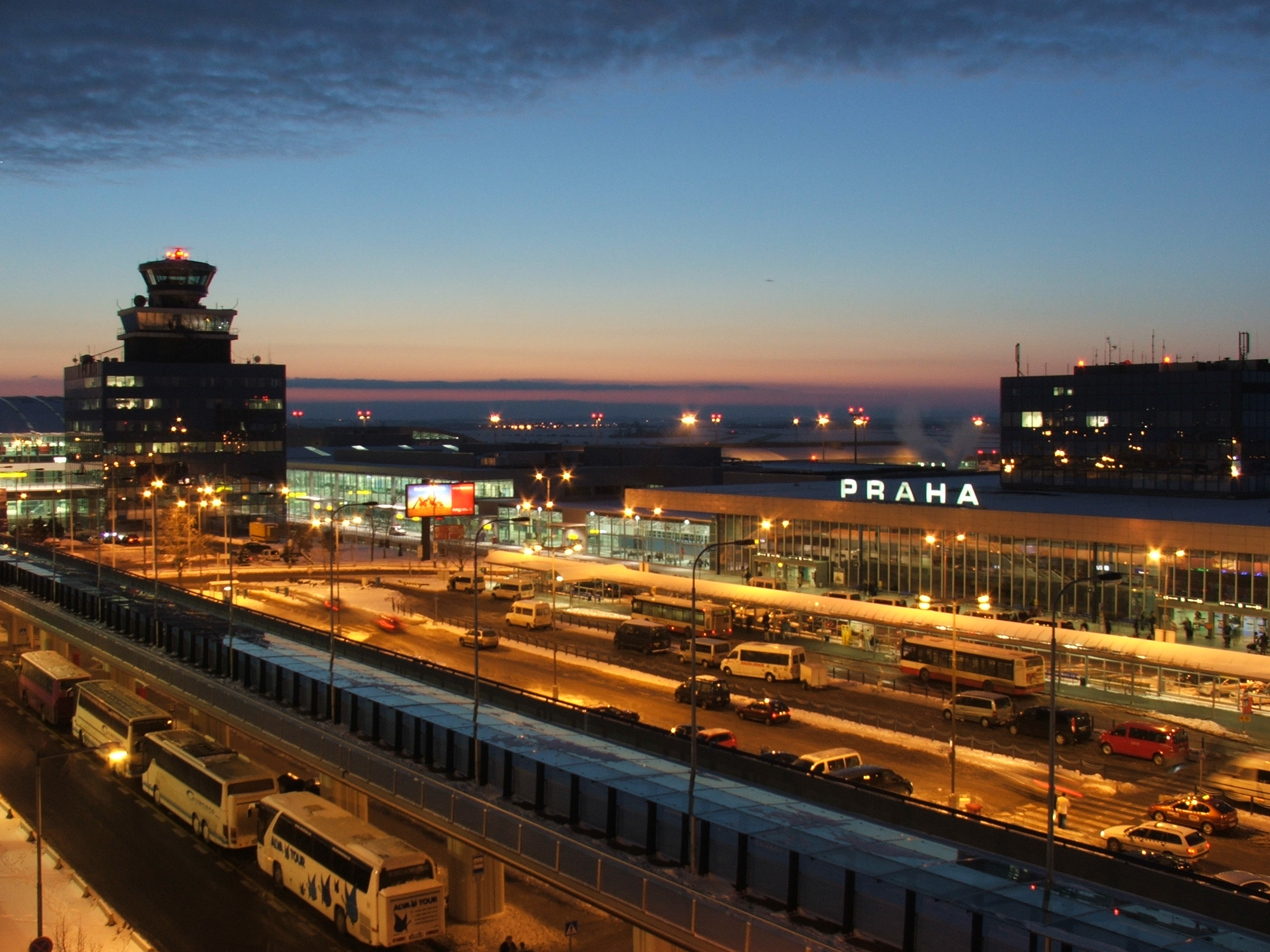
Terminal 1

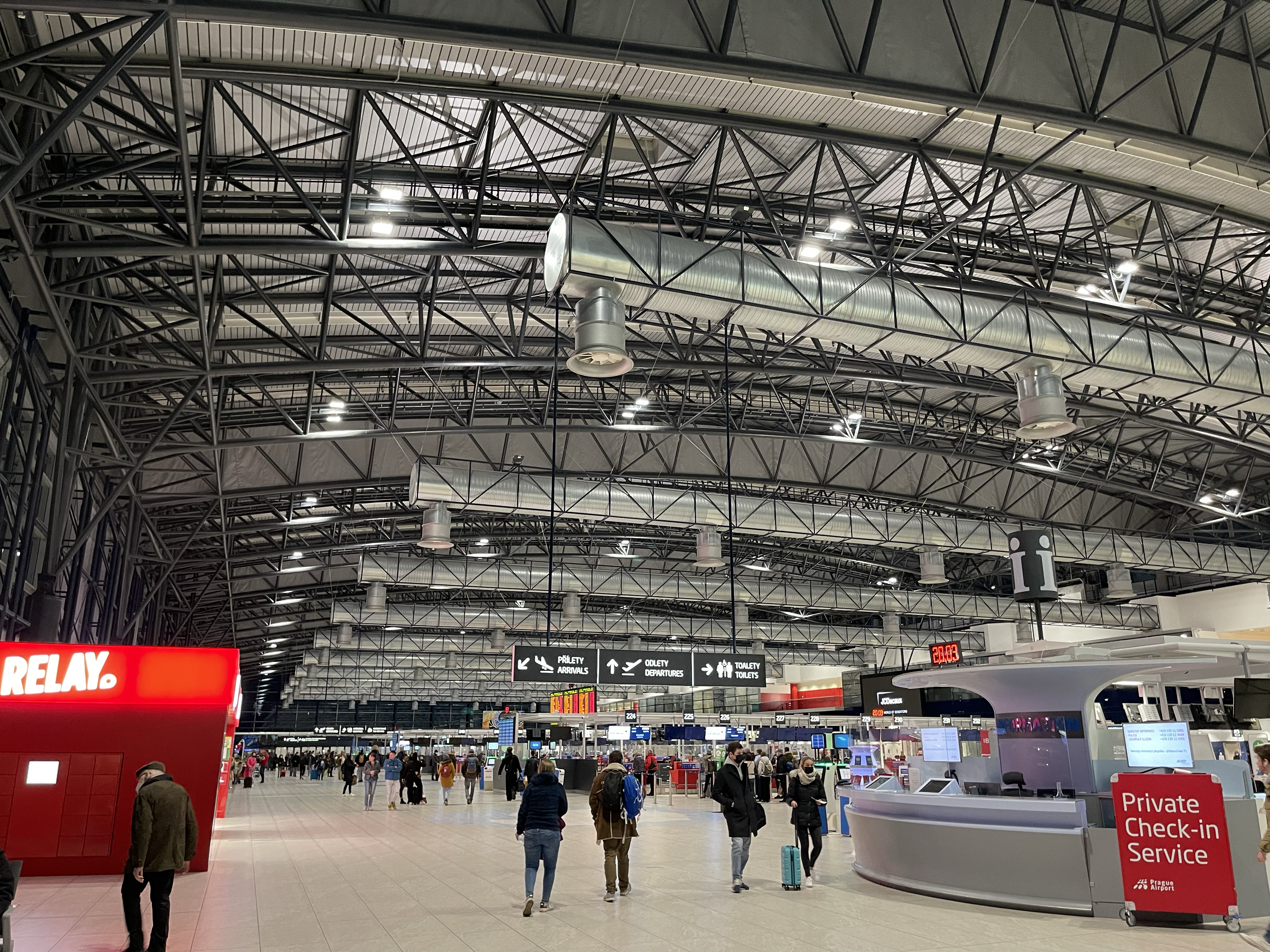
Terminal 2 interior

=== Terminals ===
Prague Airport has two main passenger terminals, two general aviation terminals, as well as a cargo facility. Most flights depart Prague Airport from the North Terminals (Terminals 1 and 2). The South Terminals (Terminals 3 and 4) handle a few irregular flights, as well as VIP flights, special flights and small aircraft.

- Terminal 1 is used for flights outside the Schengen Area; it was opened in 1968 and rebuilt in 1997, it includes concourses A and B
- Terminal 2 is used for flights within the Schengen area; it was opened on 17 January 2006, it includes concourses C and D
- Terminal 3 is used for private and charter flights; it was opened in 1997
- Terminal 4 is used exclusively for VIP flights and state visits; it is the oldest part of the airport, and was opened on 5 April 1937.

There are also two freight terminals. Cargo Terminal 1 is operated by Menzies Aviation Czech, while Cargo Terminal 2 is operated by Skyport.

=== Runways ===
The airport contains two runways in service: 06/24 (till April 1993 07/25) and 12/30 (till May 2012 13/31). Former runway 04/22 is permanently closed for take-offs and landings and is used for taxiing and parking only. The most used runway is 24 due to the prevailing western winds. Runway 30 is also used often. Runway 06 is used rarely, while runway 12 is used only exceptionally.

=== Other facilities ===
Arrival hall of Terminal 1

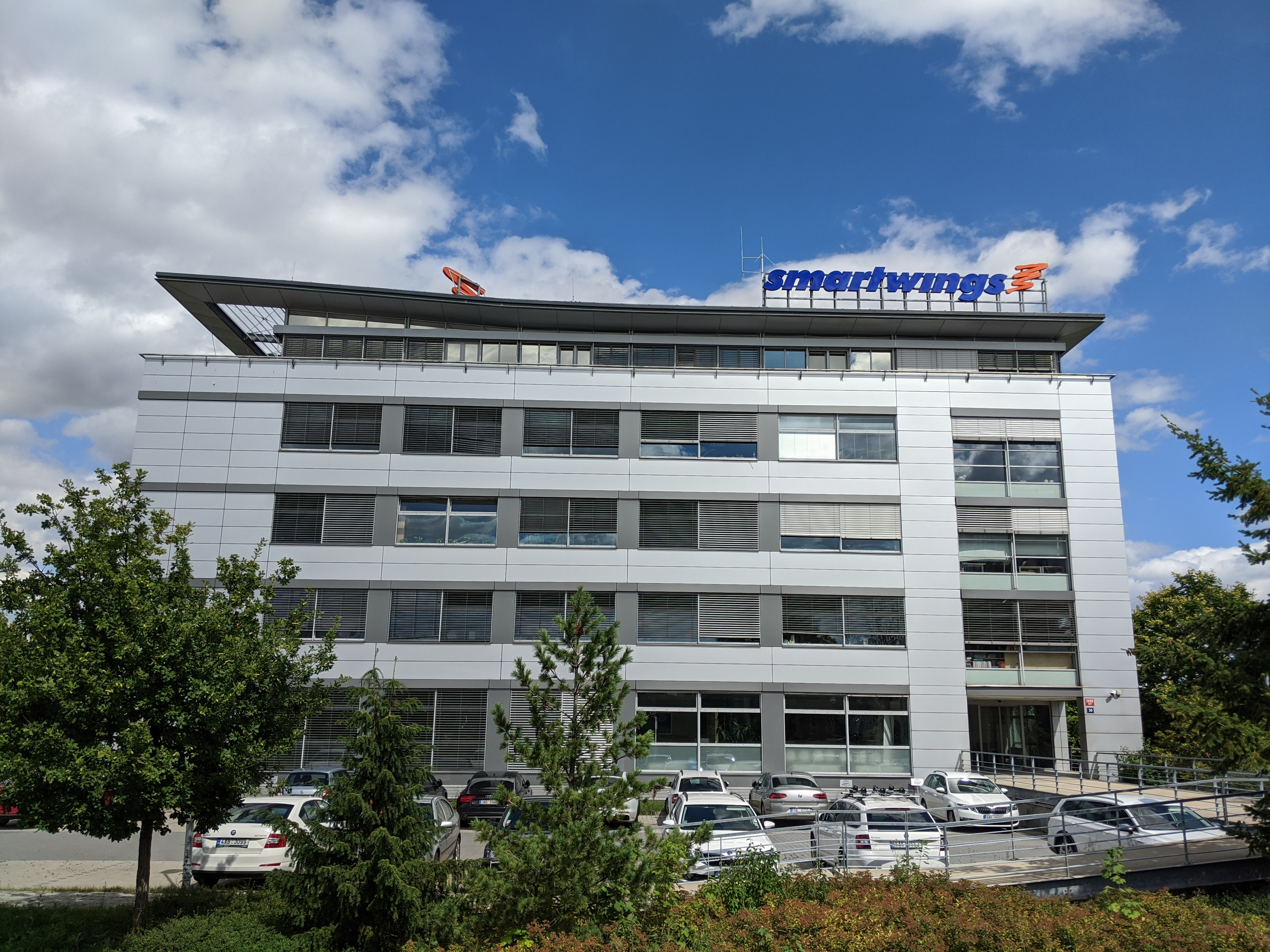
Headquarters of Smartwings at Prague Airport

Czech Airlines has its head office, the APC Building, on the grounds of Prague Airport. On 30 December 2009 CSA announced that it would sell its head office to the airport for CZK 607 million. Smartwings have their head office on the airport property. The Civil Aviation Authority also has its head office on the airport property.

=== Operations ===
The company operating the airport is Prague Airport (Letiště Praha, a. s.), a joint-stock company that has one shareholder, the Ministry of Finance. The company was founded in February 2008, as part of a privatisation process involving the Airport Prague (Správa Letiště Praha, s.p.) state enterprise. This action was in accordance with the Czech Republic Government Memorandum Nr. 888, which had been passed on 9 July 2008.

On 1 December 2008, Prague Airport took all rights and duties formerly held by Správa Letiště Praha, s.p., and Prague Airports took all business authorisations, certificates, employees, and licenses from the former company. The head office of Prague Airport is in Prague 6. The former state-owned enterprise had its head office on the airport property.

== Airlines and destinations ==
=== Passenger ===
As of 2024, Prague Airport offers flights to more than 170 destinations, with 70 carriers operating the flights. The following airlines operate regular scheduled and charter flights at Prague Airport:

Airlines	Destinations
Aegean Airlines	Athens, Thessaloniki
Aer Lingus	Cork, Dublin
Air Arabia	Sharjah
Air Baltic	Riga, Vilnius (ends 23 October 2026)
Air Cairo	Hurghada
Air Canada	Seasonal: Toronto–Pearson
Air Dolomiti	Frankfurt
Air France	Paris–Charles de Gaulle
Air Montenegro	Seasonal: Podgorica, Tivat
Air Serbia	Belgrade
AJet	Istanbul–Sabiha Gökçen; Seasonal: Bodrum
American Airlines	Seasonal: Philadelphia
Animawings	Bucharest–Otopeni
Arkia	Tel Aviv
Asiana Airlines	Seoul–Incheon
Austrian Airlines	Vienna
Azerbaijan Airlines	Baku
Bluebird Airways	Tel Aviv
British Airways	London–Heathrow
Brussels Airlines	Brussels
Bulgaria Air	Sofia; Seasonal: Varna; Seasonal charter: Burgas
China Airlines	Taipei–Taoyuan
Condor	Frankfurt
Corendon Airlines	Seasonal charter: Antalya, Izmir
Croatia Airlines	Seasonal: Dubrovnik, Split, Zagreb
Delta Air Lines	Seasonal: New York–JFK
easyJet	Amsterdam, Basel/Mulhouse, Belfast–International, Birmingham, Bordeaux, Bristol, Edinburgh, Geneva, Glasgow, Hamburg (begins 26 October 2026), Lille (begins 28 October 2026), Lisbon, Liverpool, London–Gatwick, London–Luton, Lyon, Manchester, Marrakech (begins 25 October 2026), Milan–Malpensa, Nantes, Naples, Newcastle upon Tyne, Nice, Porto; Seasonal: Alicante, Palma de Mallorca
Egyptair	Cairo
El Al	Tel Aviv
Emirates	Dubai–International
Etihad Airways	Abu Dhabi
Eurowings	Barcelona, Düsseldorf, Funchal, Geneva, Málaga, Rome–Fiumicino, Stockholm–Arlanda; Seasonal: Agadir, Alicante, Athens, Cologne/Bonn, Faro, Heraklion, Larnaca, Marrakech, Nice, Palma de Mallorca, Tallinn, Tenerife–South, Valencia
Finnair	Helsinki
Flyadeal	Seasonal: Jeddah, Riyadh
Flydubai	Dubai–International
Flynas	Seasonal: Riyadh
FlyOne	Chișinău
Freebird Airlines	Antalya, Bodrum
Hainan Airlines	Beijing–Capital
Iberia	Madrid
Icelandair	Reykjavík–Keflavík
Israir	Tel Aviv
Jazeera Airways	Seasonal: Kuwait City
Jet2.com	Birmingham, Leeds/Bradford, Manchester; Seasonal: Bournemouth, Bristol, East Midlands, Edinburgh, London–Stansted
KLM	Amsterdam
KM Malta Airlines	Malta
Korean Air	Seoul–Incheon
LOT Polish Airlines	Warsaw–Chopin
Lufthansa	Frankfurt, Munich
Luxair	Luxembourg
Neos	Seasonal charter: Bangkok-Suvarnabhumi, Krabi, Malé, Nosy Be, Punta Cana, Zanzibar
Nile Air	Seasonal charter: Hurghada
Norwegian Air Shuttle	Copenhagen, Oslo, Stockholm–Arlanda
Pegasus Airlines	Istanbul–Sabiha Gökçen; Seasonal: Antalya
Qanot Sharq	Seasonal: Tashkent
Qatar Airways	Doha
Ryanair	Amman–Queen Alia, Barcelona, Bari, Beauvais, Bergamo, Bristol, Budapest, Catania, Charleroi, Copenhagen, Dublin, East Midlands, Edinburgh, Gdańsk, Košice, Kraków, London–Stansted, Madrid, Málaga, Manchester, Marseille, Naples, Palermo (resumes 25 October 2026), Pisa, Riga, Rome–Ciampino, Seville, Tirana, Treviso; Seasonal: Bologna, Corfu, Gothenburg, Palma de Mallorca, Pescara, Poznań, Rhodes, Rimini, Skiathos, Trieste, Turin (begins 19 December 2026), Zadar
Starlux Airlines	Taipei–Taoyuan
Scandinavian Airlines	Copenhagen; Seasonal: Stockholm–Arlanda
SCAT Airlines	Astana
Sky Alps	Seasonal: Bolzano (begins 9 December 2026)
Sky Express	Athens
SkyUp Airlines	Charter: Sharm El Sheikh
Smartwings	Antalya, Barcelona, Bergen (begins 26 October 2026), Bilbao, Brussels, Bucharest-Otopeni, Dubai–Al Maktoum, Fuerteventura, Funchal, Gran Canaria, Hurghada, Lanzarote, Lisbon (begins 23 October 2026), Madrid, Málaga, Marsa Alam, Nice, Palma de Mallorca, Paris–Charles de Gaulle, Porto, Rome-Fiumicino, Tel Aviv, Tenerife–South, Toulouse, Valencia, Venice (begins 22 October 2026); Seasonal: Almería, Athens, Brindisi, Burgas, Cagliari, Catania, Chania, Corfu, Dubai–International, Heraklion, Izmir, La Palma, Karpathos, Kefalonia, Kos, Lamezia Terme, Larnaca, Menorca, Olbia, Ponta Delgada, Preveza/Lefkada, Rhodes, Samos, Santorini, Split, Thessaloniki, Tirana, Varna, Zakynthos; Seasonal charter: Abu Dhabi, Agadir, Bahrain, Cairo, Djerba, Doha, El Alamein, Enfidha, Kavala, Kayseri, Marsa Matruh, Mombasa, (Note: Smartwings charter flight from Prague to Mombasa makes a stop in Hurghada. However, the airline does not have traffic rights to transport passengers solely between Hurghada and Mombasa.) Mytilene, Nador, Palermo, Porto Santo, Sharm El Sheikh, Skyros, Taba
SunExpress	Antalya; Seasonal: Izmir, Kayseri
Swiss International Air Lines	Zurich
TAP Air Portugal	Lisbon
TAROM	Bucharest–Otopeni
Transavia	Eindhoven, Paris–Orly
TUI Airways	Seasonal: Phu Quoc; Seasonal charter: Sihanoukville (begins 19 December 2026)
Turkish Airlines	Istanbul
TUS Airways	Tel Aviv
VietJet Air	Hanoi
Volotea	Florence, Lyon, Nantes; Seasonal: Bordeaux, Verona
Vueling	Barcelona, Bilbao; Seasonal: Paris–Orly
Wizz Air	Bucharest–Otopeni, Catania, Chișinău, Iași, Kutaisi, Larnaca, London–Gatwick, London–Luton, Palermo, Poprad–Tatry (begins 25 October 2026), Rome–Fiumicino, Sarajevo (begins 3 December 2026), Skopje, Sofia, Timișoara, Tirana, Vilnius, Yerevan; Seasonal: Turin (begins 16 January 2027)
World2Fly	Seasonal charter: Phu Quoc, Puerto Vallarta, Punta Cana

=== Cargo ===
Airlines	Destinations
ASL Airlines	Brno, Paris–Charles de Gaulle
Central Airlines	Chengdu
UPS Airlines	Cologne/Bonn

== Statistics ==
=== Annual passenger numbers ===
Year	Passengers handled (Note: Number of passengers including domestic, international and transit)	Passenger % change	Cargo (tonnes)	Cargo % change	Aircraft movements	Aircraft movements % change
2001	6,098,742		29,571			
2002	6,314,653	▲3.54	34,829	▲17.78	103,904	
2003	7,463,120	▲18.19	41,440	▲18.98	115,756	
2004	9,696,413	▲29.92	46,885	▲13.14	144,962	
2005	10,777,020	▲11.14	46,002	▼ -1.88	160,213	
2006	11,581,511	▲7.46	54,972	▲6.27	166,346	
2007	12,436,254	▲7.38	55,179	▲0.38	174,662	
2008	12,630,557	▲1.56	47,870	▼ -13.25	178,628	
2009	11,643,366	▼ -7.82	42,476	▼ -11.27	163,816	▼ -8.57
2010	11,556,858	▼ -0.74	58,275	▲37.19	156,052	▼ -4.63
2011	11,788,629	▲2.01	62,688	▲7.57	150,717	▼ -3.50
2012	10,807,890	▼ -8.32	52,977	▼ -15.49	131,564	▼ -12.78
2013	10,974,196	▲1.54	51,902	▼ -2.03	128,633	▼ -2.77
2014	11,149,926	▲1.60	50,897	▼ -1.93	125,437	▼ -2.43
2015	12,030,928	▲7.90	50,595	▼ -0.59	128,018	▲0.62
2016	13,074,517	▲8.67	71,091	▲40.51	136,766	▲6.74
2017	15,415,001	▲17.9	81,879	▲15.18	148,223	▲8.40
2018	16,797,006	▲8.97	80,915	▼ -1.18	155,532	▲4.81
2019	17,804,900	▲6.00	81,768	▲1.05	154,777	▼ -0.48
2020	3,665,871	▼79.40	52,442	▼ -35,86	54,163	▼ -65.00
2021	4,388,826	▲19.72	64,402	▲17.08	61,194	▲12.98
2022	10,734,880	▲244.60	47,774	▼ -22.19	100,629	▲64.44
2023	13,828,137	▲28.82	43,856	▼ -8.2	118,046	▲17.30
2024	16,353,522	▲18.26			134,609	▲14.03
2025	17,750,528	▲8.56			140,545	▲4.4

=== Busiest routes by city ===
Rank	City (all airports)	2024
1	London	1,385,866
2	Paris	719,419
3	Amsterdam	651,465
4	Milan	605,690
5	Rome	535,577

=== Busiest routes by country ===
Rank	Country	2024
1	United Kingdom	2,107,931
2	Italy	1,896,121
3	Spain	1,618,351
4	France	975,064
5	Turkey	954,312

== Ground transportation ==
=== Road ===
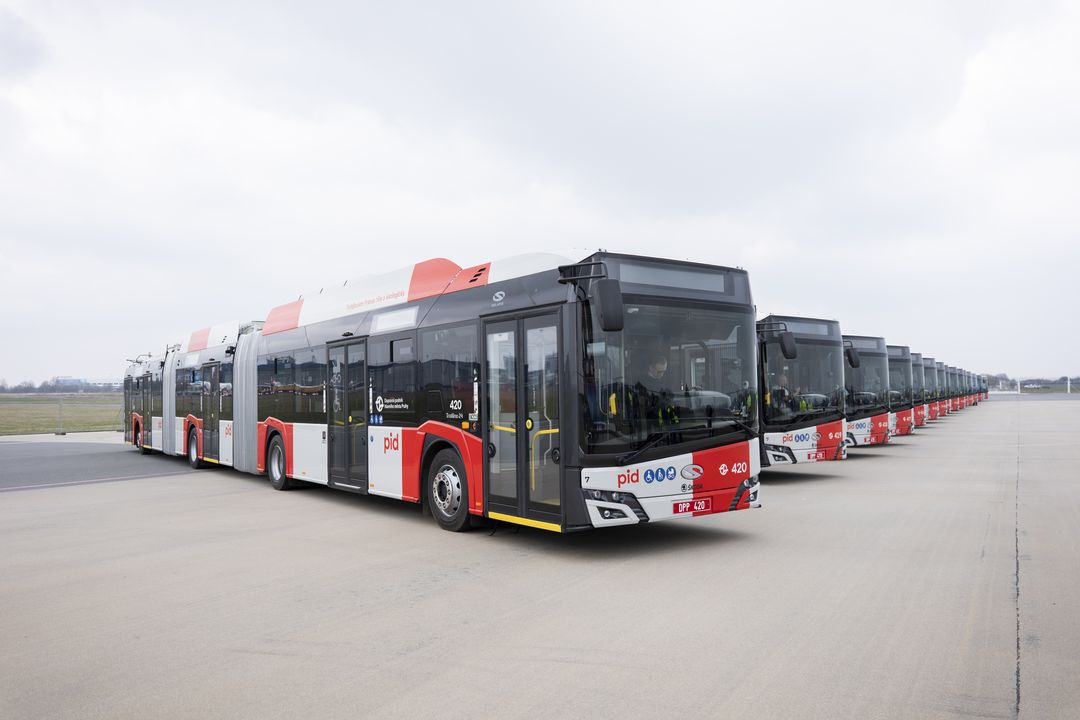
Fleet of very long trolleybuses which Prague bought in 2024 for the line which connects the airport with the Nádraží Veleslavín metro station

Buses of DPP, the Prague Public Transit Co., serve both terminals 1 and 2 frequently, connecting it to Prague and other surrounding towns. Since 2024, a frequent trolleybus line 59 connects both terminals directly to the metro A station Nádraží Veleslavín, from which people can get to the city center. The ride to the metro takes around 15 minutes and the metro ride to the center also around 15 minutes.

A Czech Railways public bus service, AE – AirportExpress, connects Terminal 1 with Praha hlavní nádraží. From the bus station in front of Terminal 1 there are also regular buses to Kladno, intercity buses of Regiojet run every 30–60 minutes to Karlovy Vary and Cheb.

=== Proposed rail connection ===
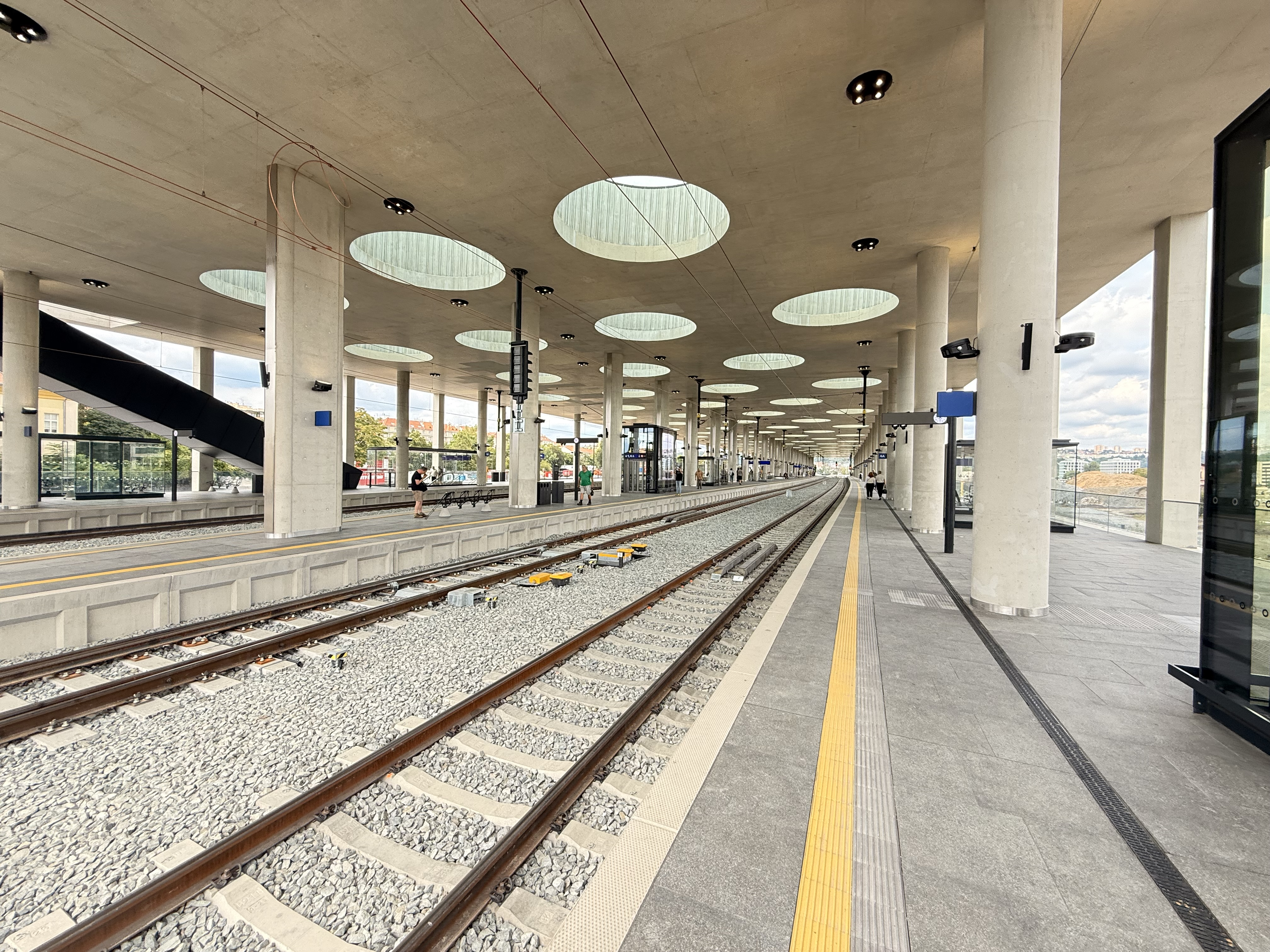
Praha-Bubny railway station was reconstructed in 2025, and is one of the first parts of the construction of the modernised railway leading to the airport.

There are plans to build a rail connection to the airport. Preliminary work commenced in 2018, with procurement proceedings launched the following year. Main construction was expected to start around 2023, but as of 2025 construction had not yet begun. According to a 2021 media report, the airport is to be served via a branch off the Prague-Kladno line, including an underground station to serve the airport. The project also includes double tracking and electrifying the existing single-track railway. The plan also includes upgrades to Prague-Masarykovo station, which began in 2024. The project is notable for being the first ever public-private partnership in Czech railway history, and is expected to be completed around 2030 at a cost of 28 billion crowns.

== Accidents and incidents ==
- On 19 February 1973, Aeroflot Flight 141, a Tupolev Tu-154, crashed half a kilometre short of the airport during final approach. While most of the passengers survived the crash, many died in the fire that followed. Altogether 66 people died out of the 100 passengers and crew. The crash was the first loss of and the first fatal accident involving a Tu-154.
- On 30 October 1975, Inex-Adria Aviopromet Flight 450, a Douglas DC-9-32 hit high ground during an approach in fog to Prague Ruzyně Airport. 75 of the 120 passengers and crew on board were killed.

== In popular culture ==
The airport stood in for Miami International Airport in the 2006 James Bond film Casino Royale.

== See also ==
- Transport in Prague
- List of airports in the Czech Republic
