= Air Montenegro =

Flag carrier of Montenegro

Air Montenegro To Montenegro a.d.

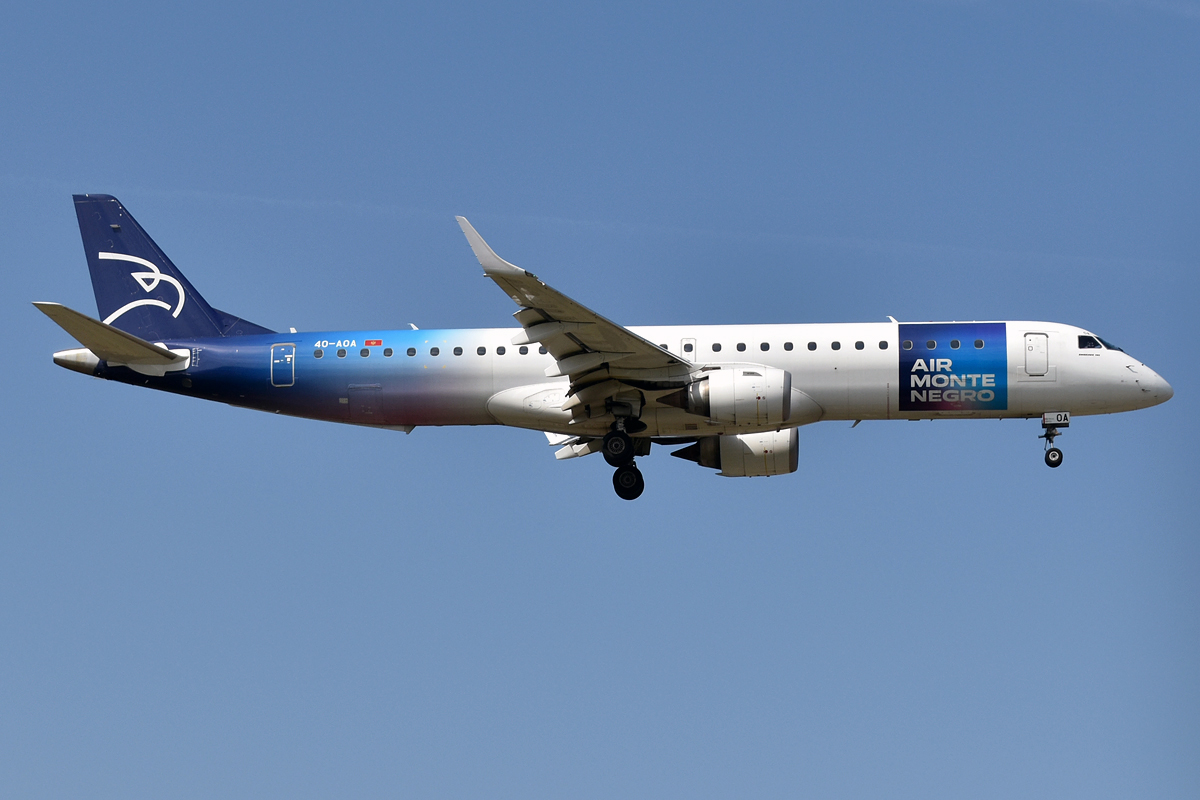
- Air Montenegro Embraer 195
IATA	ICAO	Call sign
4O	MNE	MOUNT EAGLE
- Founded: 8 February 2021; 5 years ago
- Commenced operations: 10 June 2021; 5 years ago (as Air Montenegro)
- Hubs: Podgorica Airport
- Secondary hubs: Tivat Airport
- Fleet size: 4
- Destinations: 15
- Parent company: Government of Montenegro
- Headquarters: Podgorica, Montenegro
- Key people: Vukadin Stojanović, CEO
- Website: airmontenegro.com/en

To Montenegro a.d. (stylised as ToMontenegro and 2Montenegro), is the flag carrier of Montenegro, which is branded and operates under the name Air Montenegro (Montenegrin Cyrillic: Ер Монтенегро), a new company opened in early 2021 by the government of Montenegro. Air Montenegro officially launched operations in June 2021.

== History ==
=== Background and origins ===
The predecessor airline company Montenegro Airlines was founded on 24 October 1994, by the government of the Montenegro Republic. The first aircraft, a Fokker 28 Mk4000 (nicknamed "Lovćen"), was purchased almost two years later in 1996. The first commercial flight took place on 7 May 1997, at exactly 10:30 between Podgorica and Bari, Italy. In April 2000, its became a member of the International Air Transport Association (IATA). In June 2000, the first of five Fokker 100 aircraft was delivered to Podgorica Airport. The airline joined Amadeus CRS on 5 March 2003. In 2004, Montenegro Airlines' pilots were the first in the region to be granted the IIIA certificate. In August 2016, it was reported that accounts belonging to Montenegro Airlines had been frozen after the airline failed to comply with a court ruling regarding the payment of debts to the operator of the country's airports. Montenegro Airlines owed the company more than US$15 million.

In December 2020, the Government of Montenegro announced the shutdown and liquidation of the Montenegro Airlines a.d company in the forthcoming weeks stating mismanagement and accumulating losses for several years. Shortly after, it was announced that the airline would suspend all flights from 26 December 2020 marking the end of its operations.

=== Airline foundation ===
On 29 December 2020, it was announced by Minister Mladen Bojanić that the Montenegro Airlines would be reorganized and replaced with a new company the To Montenegro (2 Montenegro), as the new Montenegrin flag carrier airline. The liquidation procedure of Montenegro Airlines would cost about 50 million euro but it is inevitable, as the country's competition authority has ruled that the law for public investment in the flag carrier adopted in 2019 was illegal, the government said in December 2021.

The new company was officially introduced on 2 March 2021 by the government. In April 2021, it was reported that the Montenegrin government made Air Montenegro the official name for the ToMontenegro project and that the airline would start up using two Embraer 195 aircraft, transferred from former Montenegro Airlines. On 10 June 2021, then Minister of Economic Development of Montenegro, Jakov Milatović, paid a visit to the neighboring Republic of Serbia, being one of the passengers at the first commercial flight of the new national airline Air Montenegro to Nikola Tesla Airport in Belgrade.

==== Origin of "Air Montenegro" company name ====
Despite being formed in 2021, the name "Air Montenegro" had existed beforehand. In 1990 a private start-up airline with name Air Montenegro was formed. Air Montenegro operated for about two years until was shut down due to war in ex Yugoslavia region. Company had an Airline Operator Certificate and used a single YAK-40 jet aircraft registration LZ-DOB on a wet lease contract from Bulgarian airline Hemus Air.

It operated flights to Bari Italy with the flight number 9901/9902 inherited for Adria Airways which operated the same line before the war

== Destinations ==
Air Montenegro Destinations
Country	City	Airport	Notes
Armenia	Yerevan	Zvartnots International Airport	Terminated
Azerbaijan	Baku	Heydar Aliyev International Airport	Terminated
Belgium	Brussels	Brussels Airport	Begins 30 November 2026
Bosnia and Herzegovina	Banja Luka	Banja Luka International Airport	Seasonal
Croatia	Zagreb	Zagreb Airport	Begins 26 November 2026
Czech Republic	Brno	Brno-Tuřany Airport	Seasonal
Czech Republic	Prague	Václav Havel Airport Prague	Seasonal
France	Lille	Lille-Lesquin Airport	Seasonal
France	Lyon	Lyon–Saint-Exupéry Airport	Seasonal
France	Nantes	Nantes Atlantique Airport	Seasonal
France	Paris	Charles de Gaulle Airport	
Germany	Frankfurt	Frankfurt Airport	
Italy	Bari	Bari Karol Wojtyła Airport	Begins 17 December 2026
Italy	Rome	Rome Fiumicino Airport	
Montenegro	Podgorica	Podgorica Airport	Hub
Montenegro	Tivat	Tivat Airport	Focus city
Serbia	Belgrade	Belgrade Nikola Tesla Airport	
Slovakia	Bratislava	Bratislava Airport	Seasonal
Slovenia	Ljubljana	Ljubljana Airport	
Switzerland	Zurich	Zurich Airport	
Turkey	Istanbul	Istanbul Airport	
Turkey	İzmir	İzmir Adnan Menderes Airport	Seasonal

=== Codeshare agreements ===
- Turkish Airlines

== Fleet ==
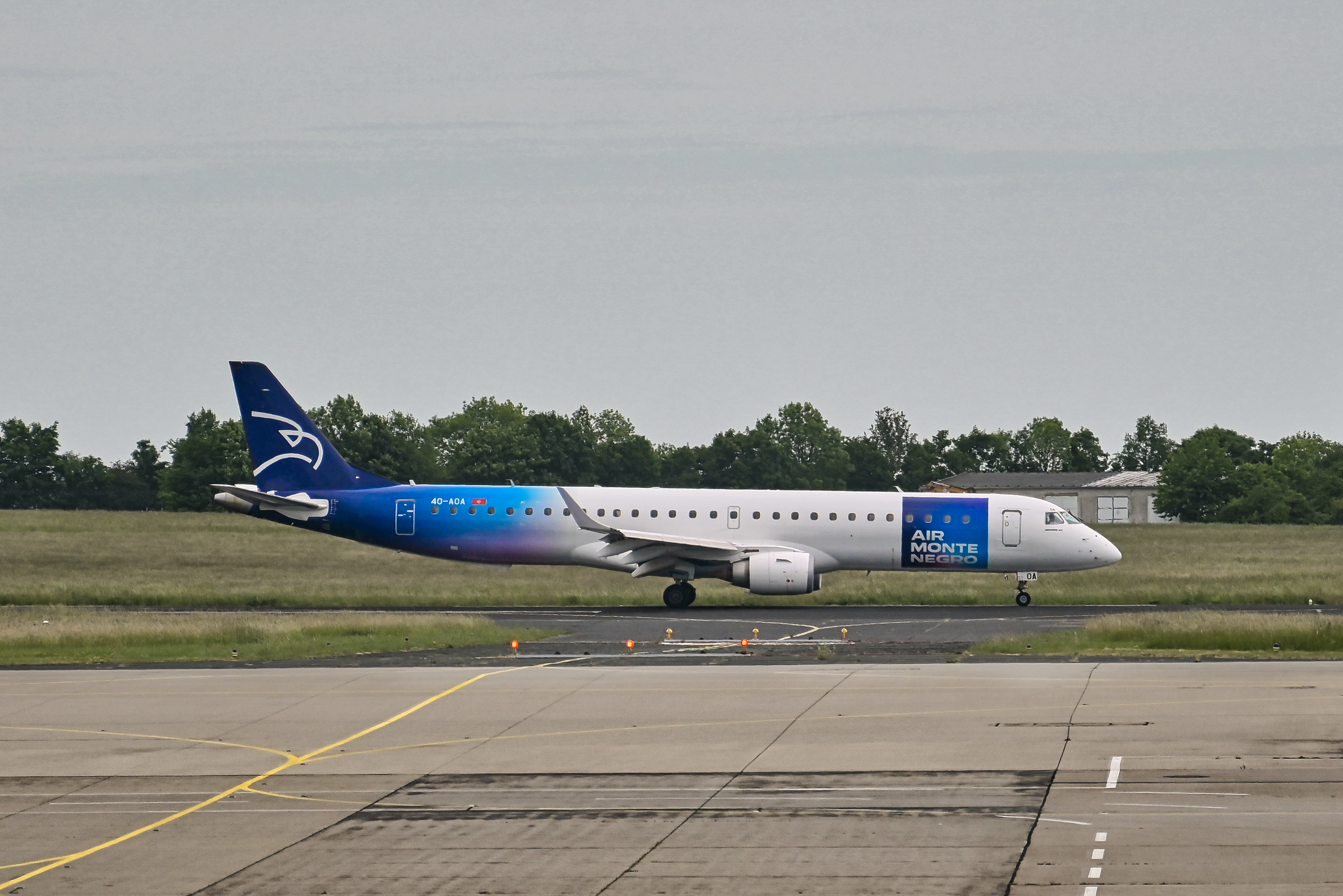
Air Montenegro Embraer 195

=== Current fleet ===
As of July 2026, Air Montenegro operates the following aircraft:

Air Montenegro fleet
Aircraft	In service	Orders	Passengers			Notes
Aircraft	In service	Orders	Y	C	Total	Notes
Embraer 195	4	—	var.	var.	116	Both aircraft inherited from now-defunct Montenegro Airlines. Both aircraft owned.
Embraer 195	4	—	var.	var.	118	One aircraft owned.
Total	4	—				

=== Business class ===
In a 2026 review, airline commentator Josh Cahill criticized Air Montenegro’s business class product, arguing that the airline’s Embraer E195 aircraft feature a single-class cabin layout without business class seating. According to Cahill, business class is sold at a significant fare premium despite none of Air Montenegro’s planes being equipped with business class seats or service. Multiple passengers who have purchased business class seating are downgraded upon check in to an economy seat, with gate agents claiming a last minute plane change. Gate agents instruct passengers who are downgraded to reach out to customer support for a refund, and subsequently have their refund requests ignored. This has led to accusations of Air Montenegro scamming passengers by selling non existent business class seating.

=== Historic fleet ===
Air Montenegro historic fleet
Aircraft	In fleet	Introduced	Retired	Notes
Embraer 190	1			
