= Podgorica Airport =

International airport serving Podgorica, Montenegro

Podgorica Airport Aerodrom Podgorica
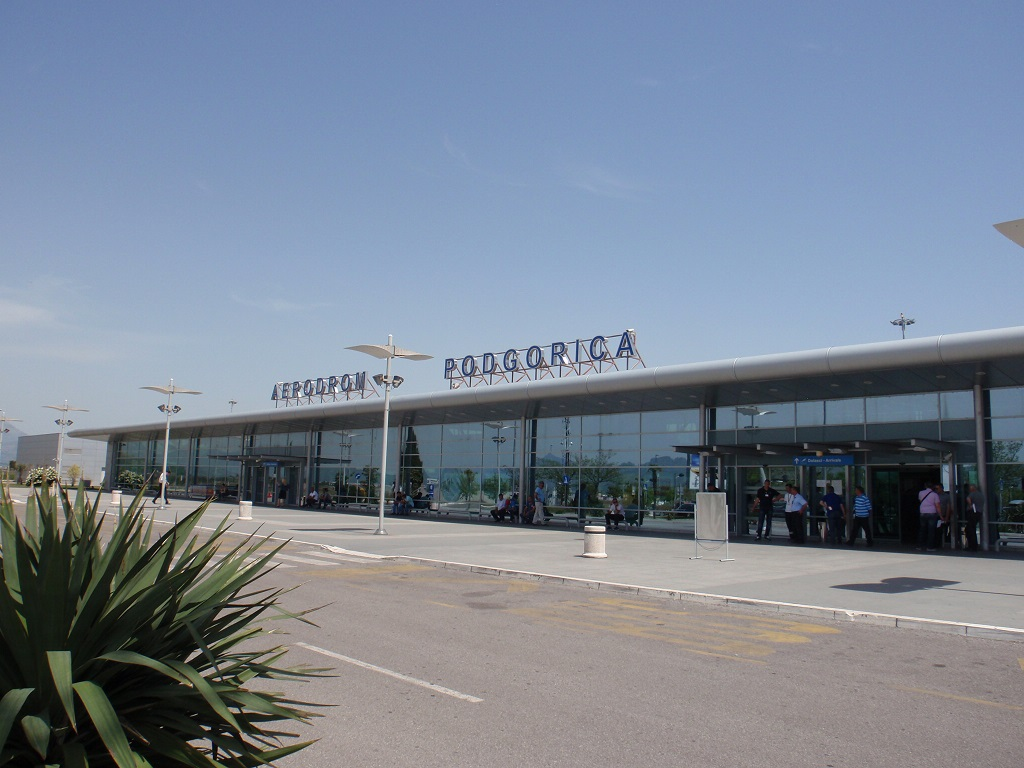
- IATA: TGD; ICAO: LYPG

Summary
- Airport type: Public
- Owner: Government of Montenegro
- Operator: Airports of Montenegro
- Serves: Podgorica
- Location: Golubovci, Montenegro
- Hub for: Air Montenegro
- Elevation AMSL: 141 ft (43 m)
- Coordinates: 42°21′34″N 19°15′07″E
- Website: www.montenegroairports.com

Map
- Location of the airport in Montenegro

Runways
Direction	Length		Surface
Direction	ft	m	Surface
18/36	8,202	2,500	Asphalt

Statistics (2025)
- Number of passengers: 1,751,750
- Source: Airports of Montenegro

Podgorica Airport (Montenegrin: Aerodrom Podgorica / Аеродром Подгорица, pronounced [aerǒdrom pǒdɡoritsa]) (IATA: TGD, ICAO: LYPG) is an international airport serving the Montenegrin capital of Podgorica and the surrounding region. It is one of two international airports in Montenegro, the other being Tivat Airport. Both are operated by the state-owned company Airports of Montenegro (Аеродроми Црне Горе / Aerodromi Crne Gore).

The airport is located in the Zeta Plain, 5 km (3 mi) south Podgorica urban area and 8 km (5.0 mi) north of Skadar Lake, within administrative boundaries of Golubovci, Zeta Municipality. Montenegrin national carrier Air Montenegro is based at the airport. The airport's IATA code, TGD, is based on the city's former name, Titograd.

== History ==
History of civil aviation in Podgorica begins on 29 May 1928, with landing of Aeroput Potez 29/2 biplane on a grass runway located in Ćemovsko polje. This flight was a second leg of an experimental circular route, originating and terminating in Belgrade, flown via Skopje, Podgorica, Mostar Airport and Sarajevo, with the aim of exploring viability of regular air travel in southern Kingdom of Yugoslavia.

On 5 May 1930, an Aeroput Farman F.300 landed at an airfield near Stara Varoš, carrying passengers on a Belgrade - Sarajevo - Podgorica route, marking the beginning of passenger air traffic in Podgorica.

During World War II, Podgorica airfield was used by the occupying Axis powers, making it a target for devastating Allied bombings in 1943 and 1944.

Scheduled passenger service at the airport began on 8 April 1946, with three weekly flights on Podgorica - Belgrade route. Service was operated by JAT, using Douglas C-47 airplanes, converted for passenger use. In April 1957, JAT began operating scheduled cargo flights to Belgrade, via Sarajevo. Location of the airport was a limiting factor for further expansion, resulting in a decision to build a new airport further south and away from Podgorica urban area.

Podgorica Airport exists on its current location since 1961, sharing a 2,500 m × 45 m (8,202 ft × 148 ft) asphalt runway with Podgorica Airbase, with old airport being relegated to general aviation use. Airport facilities underwent significant expansion in 1977.

In 1996, Podgorica Airport became a base for a Montenegro Airlines, with airline fleet initially being a single Fokker F28.

Due to proximity of Podgorica Airbase facilities, passenger terminal of the airport sustained minor damage during NATO bombing of Yugoslavia in 1999.

Since its construction in 1961 until 2003, Podgorica Airport was owned and managed by Belgrade-based JAT Airways. The airline operated Podgorica Airport as a feeder to its Belgrade hub, with Podgorica - Belgrade flights accounting for the overwhelming majority of passenger traffic. This practice largely ended with the transfer of airport ownership to government owned public company Airports of Montenegro, which took place on 23 April 2003.

Airport facilities underwent major upgrade in 2006, including construction of a new passenger terminal building, apron extension, taxiway system overhaul, and updated airfield lighting system.

== Facilities ==
=== Terminals ===
Podgorica Airport has a single passenger terminal building, in use since 14 May 2006. A single-level building with 7,900 m^{2} (85,000 sq ft) floor area features

- 8 check in counters
- 2 departure lanes (2 boarding ticket checkpoints, followed by 2 border control points and 2 security checkpoints)
- 8 departure gates
- 2 arrival gates
- 6 arrival border check points
- 2 baggage claim conveyors

Passengers usually walk between the gate and the aircraft, while airport busses are used mainly during summer peak traffic or heavy rainfall. Mobile stairs are used for passenger boarding and deplaning, as terminal building does not feature jet bridges. Old terminal building has been repurposed for administrative use, and is not accessible to passengers. Airport features publicly accessible parking lot with capacity for 300 vehicles. The terminal has been designed to handle up to a million passenger per year, and is operating beyond capacity since 2017, with most extreme overcrowding during summer peak traffic.

=== Runway ===
Podgorica airport features a single runway, marked 18/36, owing to its perfect north / south alignment. The runway is 2,500 meters (8,200 ft) long and 45 meters (148 ft) wide, while parallel taxiway is present for the entire length of the runway.

The airport has ICAO classification 4E ILS Cat I, though ILS landing is only possible on runway 36; the northern approach to runway 18 is visual only, possible under perfect VMC, due to the proximity of the Dinaric Alps in the north. During standard runway 36 approach, airliners align with the runway by performing a spectacular 200° right turn, 530 meters (1,740 ft) above the surface of Lake Skadar.

=== Military use ===
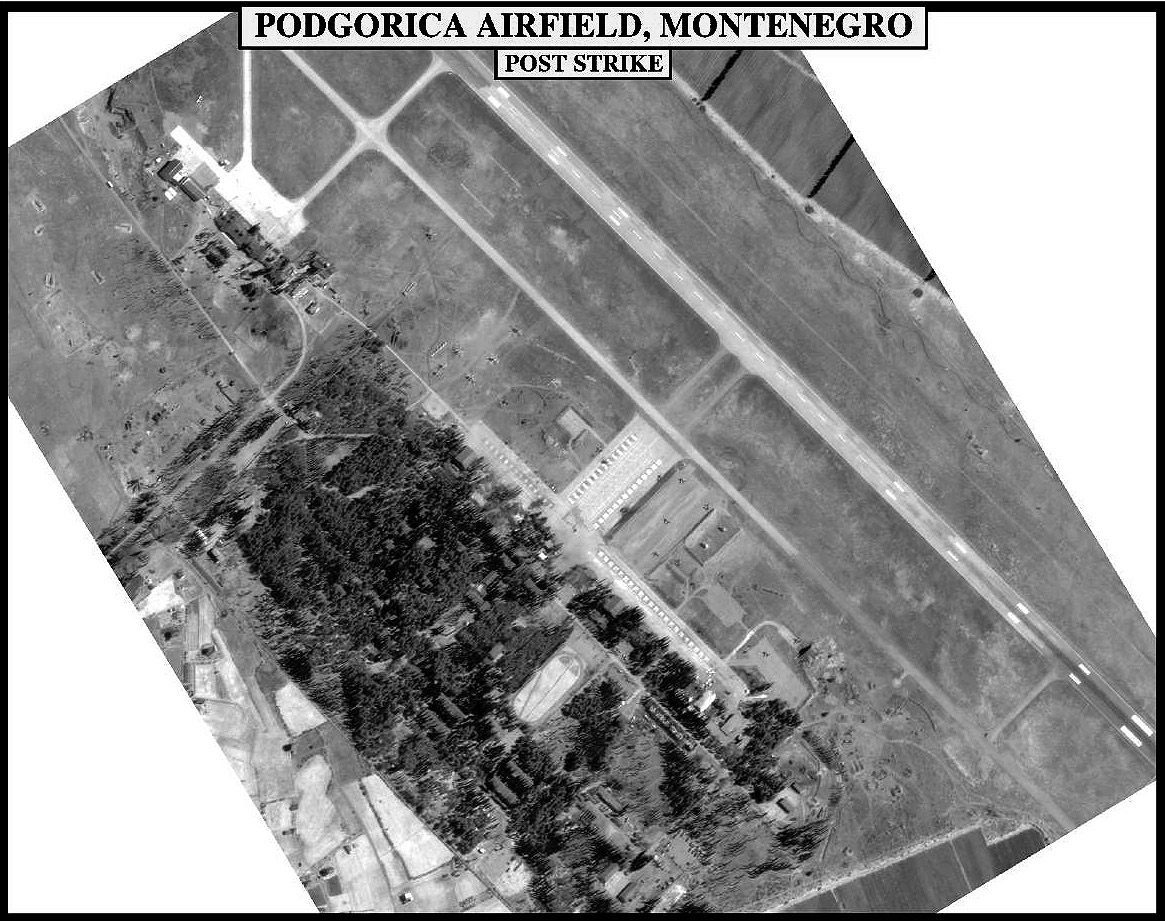
Damage done to Podgorica Airport after the 1999 NATO bombing of Yugoslavia

Podgorica Airport shares a runway with Montenegrin Air Force Podgorica Airbase. In addition to the airbase proper and adjacent apron, military facilities included Šipčanik complex - underground aircraft shelter tunneled into the eponymous hill, as well as 6-kilometer-long (20,000 ft) taxiway, connecting the complex to main runway. In an emergency, jets stored in the shelter could scramble using the wider, northern section of the taxiway. As Montenegro Air Force does not operate fixed wing aircraft, entire Šipčanik complex was decommissioned and converted to civilian use in early 2000s.

Airbase facilities were a frequent target of NATO bombing of Yugoslavia. While military equipment and infrastructure sustained severe damage, airport terminal and runway were not targeted.

On 9 December 1999, the airport was a site of a tense standoff between Yugoslav Army and Montenegro security forces, in a culmination of a struggle for control over the airport between Montenegro and federal government.

== Airlines and destinations ==
The following airlines serve scheduled and seasonal services to and from Podgorica Airport:

Airlines	Destinations	Refs
Aegean Airlines	Seasonal: Athens	
Air Astana	Seasonal: Almaty, Astana	
Air Montenegro	Bari (begins 17 December 2026), Belgrade, Brussels (begins 30 November 2026), Frankfurt, Istanbul, Ljubljana, Paris–Charles de Gaulle, Rome–Fiumicino, Zagreb (begins 26 November 2026), Zurich; Seasonal: Bratislava, Brno, Nantes, Prague	
Air Serbia	Belgrade	
Austrian Airlines	Vienna	
Enter Air	Seasonal charter: Poznań	
flynas	Seasonal: Riyadh	
LOT Polish Airlines	Seasonal: Warsaw–Chopin	
Pegasus Airlines	Ankara, Istanbul-Sabiha Gökçen, İzmir	
Ryanair	London–Stansted; Seasonal: Charleroi, Gdańsk, Kraków, Poznań, Wrocław	
Smartwings	Seasonal charter: Gdańsk, Katowice	
SunExpress	Seasonal: Antalya, İzmir	
Transavia	Seasonal: Paris–Orly	
Turkish Airlines	Istanbul	
Wizz Air	Barcelona, Basel/Mulhouse, Beauvais, Budapest, Cologne, Dortmund, Hamburg, Karlsruhe/Baden-Baden, Ljubljana, Maastricht/Aachen, Malmö, Memmingen, Milan–Malpensa, Rome–Fiumicino; Seasonal: Bratislava, Catania, Gdańsk, Katowice, London–Gatwick, Poznań, Rzeszów, Vilnius, Warsaw–Chopin, Wrocław	

== Statistics ==
=== Passenger traffic ===
Traffic figures at Podgorica Airport
Year	Passengers	Change
2004	327,616	▲8%
2005	319,665	▼2%
2006	400,040	▲25%
2007	465,234	▲16%
2008	544,907	▲17%
2009	455,642	▼16%
2010	661,575	▲45%
2011	619,676	▼6%
2012	639,354	▲3%
2013	690,009	▲8%
2014	701,594	▲2%
2015	748,905	▲7%
2016	872,655	▲17%
2017	1,054,276	▲21%
2018	1,208,527	▲15%
2019	1,297,367	▲7%
2020	343,187	▼74%
2021	652,683	▲90%
2022	1,266,893	▲94%
2023	1,657,522	▲31%
2024	1,757,522	▲6%
2025	1,751,750	▼0%

=== Route frequency ===
Route frequency at Podgorica Airport
City	Airport	Weekly Departures (Winter 2024/2025)	Airlines
Belgrade	Belgrade Airport	35	Air Serbia, Air Montenegro
Istanbul	Istanbul Airport, Sabiha Gökçen Airport	26	Turkish Airlines, Air Montenegro
Vienna	Vienna Airport	7	Austrian Airlines
Warsaw	Warsaw Chopin Airport	5	LOT Polish Airlines, Air Montenegro
London	London Stansted Airport	4	Ryanair
Ljubljana	Ljubljana Airport	3	Air Montenegro
İzmir	İzmir Adnan Menderes Airport	3	Pegasus Airlines
Milan	Malpensa Airport	3	Wizzair
Frankfurt	Frankfurt Airport	2	Air Montenegro
Dortmund	Dortmund Airport	2	Wizzair
Ankara	Ankara Airport	2	Pegasus Airlines
Memmingen	Memmingen Airport	2	Wizzair
Rome	Fiumicino Airport	2	Air Montenegro

=== Busiest routes ===
Top 10 busiest routes from Podgorica in 2024
Rank	Airport	Passengers	Airlines
1	Belgrade	327,902	Air Montenegro, Air Serbia
2	Istanbul	258,604	Air Montenegro, Turkish Airlines
3	Vienna	170,736	Austrian Airlines
4	Warsaw–Chopin	85,420	Air Montenegro, LOT Polish Airlines, Wizz Air
5	Istanbul–Sabiha Gökçen	71,550	Pegasus Airlines
6	Kraków	59,673	Ryanair
7	London–Stansted	52,489	Ryanair
8	Milan–Malpensa	51,115	Wizz Air
9	London–Gatwick	49,791	Wizz Air
10	Dortmund	45,825	Wizz Air

== Ground transportation ==
Podgorica Airport is accessible by the Podgorica–Bar highway (E65/E80). Section of the highway connecting airport passenger terminal with Podgorica urban area (8 kilometers (5.0 mi) long) is a dual carriageway road, and drive from central Podgorica to the airport usually takes less than 15 minutes. Construction of Sozina tunnel in 2006 and Southern Podgorica Bypass in 2021 has significantly shortened travel times between the airport and Montenegro coastal region.

Rail access to the airport is possible via Aerodrom train stop on Belgrade–Bar railway. However, it is usually not a convenient option for transfer to central Podgorica, due to 1.2 kilometers (0.75 mi) distance from the passenger terminal, and irregular train schedule.

== Accidents and incidents ==
- On 11 September 1973, Podgorica Airport was the destination of JAT Airways Flight 769, a Sud Aviation SE-210 Caravelle 6-N, which flew into the Babin Zub peak on Maganik mountain north of Podgorica. All 41 on board perished.
- On 25 January 2005, the nosegear of a Montenegro Airlines Fokker 100 (YU-AOM) collapsed after a runway excursion during a night landing in snowy conditions. The airplane skidded for about 700 meters (2,300 ft) before coming to rest, 1,180 meters (3,870 ft) after touchdown. Two passengers, the pilot and copilot received minor injuries. The airline was sued by passengers, as it was the only airline to operate flights to Podgorica that evening (other airlines canceled flights due to insufficient ice clearance technology at the airport).
- On 7 January 2008, at about 9:30pm, a Montenegro Airlines Fokker 100 (4O-AOK) sustained minor damage while landing at the airport. A routine inspection of the aircraft led to the discovery of a bullet hole in the aircraft tail. The aircraft was carrying 20 passengers, none of which were injured. Gunshot was possibly fired during a celebration of Orthodox Christmas.

== See also ==
- List of airports in Montenegro
- Tivat Airport
- Aeronautical Information Publication
