= List of airports in Montenegro =

This is a list of airports in Montenegro, grouped by type and sorted by location.

== Passenger statistics ==
Airports, with number of passengers served:

Rank	Airport	City	IATA / ICAO	2015	2016	2017	2018	2019	Change
1	Tivat Airport	Tivat	TIV/LYTV	895,033	982,558	1,129,720	1,245,999	1,367,282	▲9,7%
2	Podgorica Airport	Podgorica	TGD/LYPG	748,175	873,278	1,055,142	1,208,525	1,297,365	▲7,4%
Total				1,643,208	1,855,836	2,184,862	2,454,524	2,664,647	▲8.6%

== Airports ==
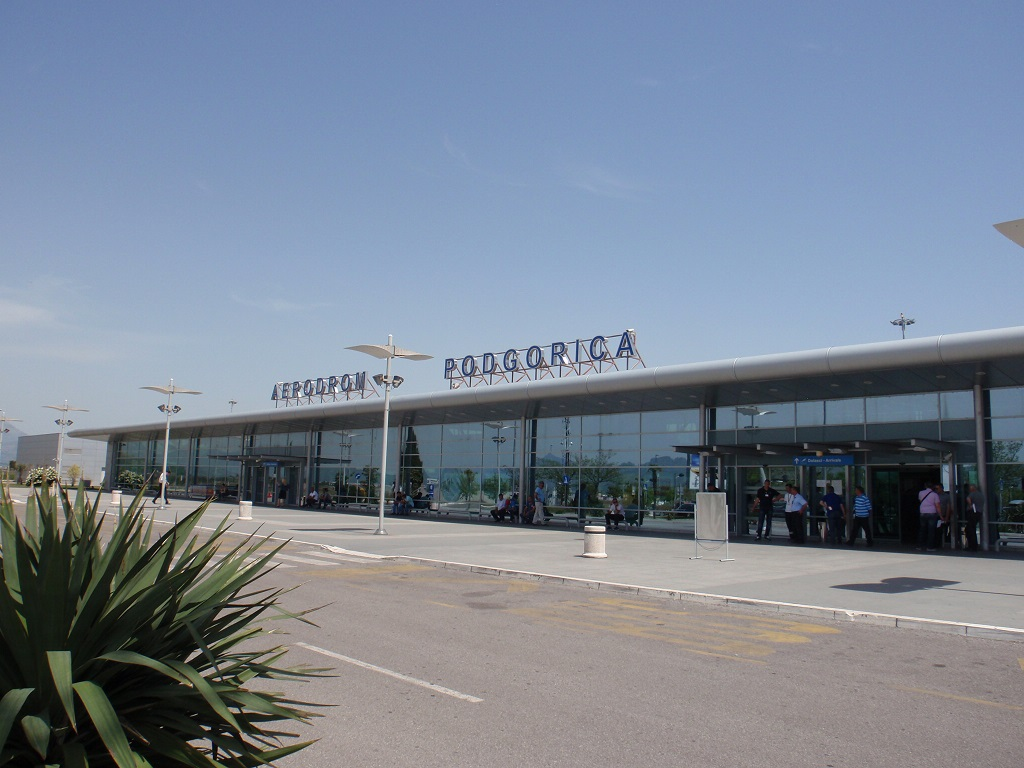
Podgorica Airport

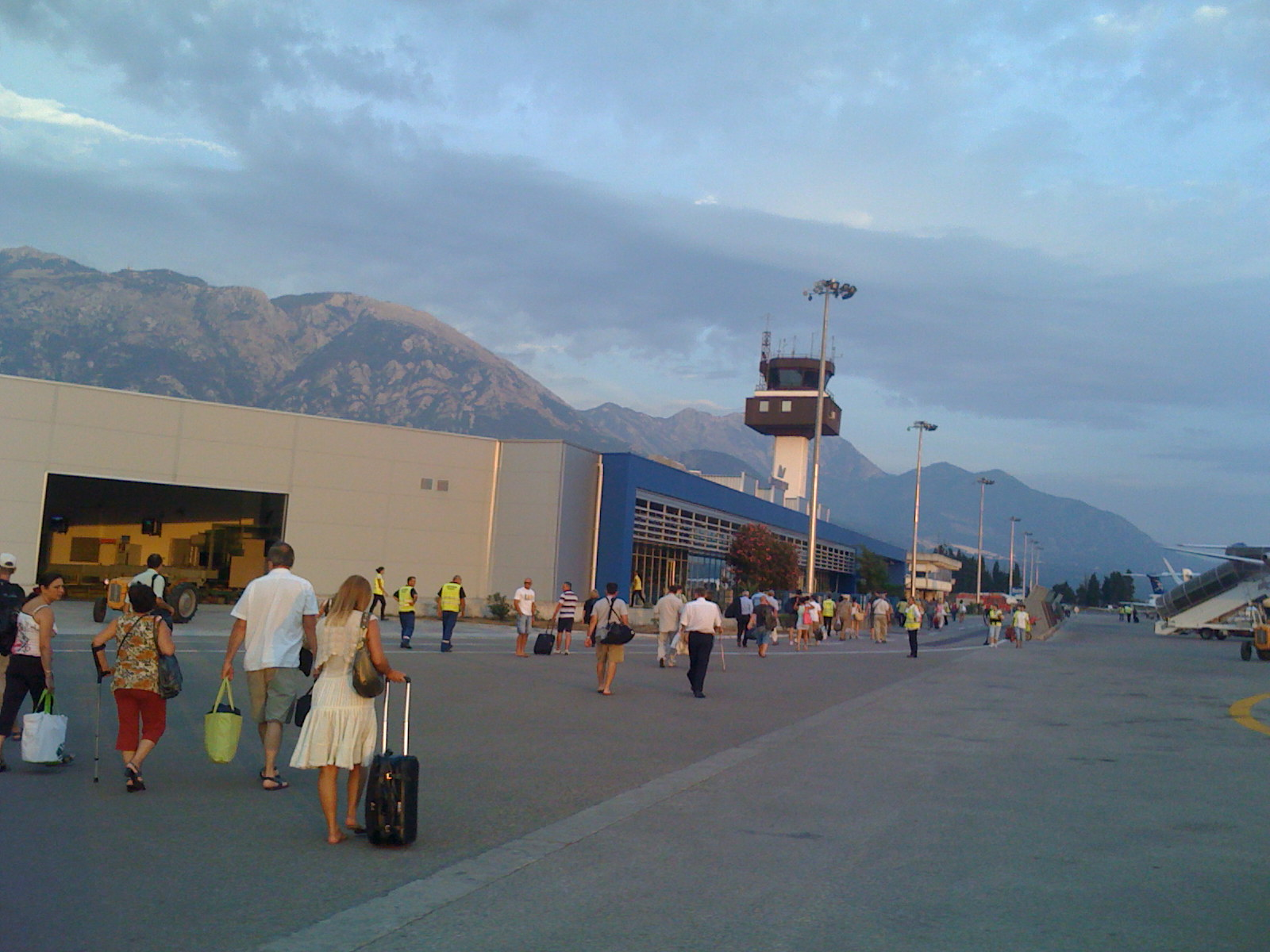
Tivat Airport

Airports shown in bold have scheduled service on commercial airlines.

City served	ICAO	IATA	Airport name
**International**			
Podgorica	LYPG	TGD	**Podgorica Airport**
Tivat	LYTV	TIV	**Tivat Airport**
**General aviation**			
Berane	LYBR	IVG	Berane Airport
Nikšić	LYNK	none	Nikšić Airport
Podgorica	LYPO	none	Ćemovsko Polje Airport
Žabljak	none	ZBK	Žabljak Airport
**Military**			
Podgorica	LYPJ	none	Podgorica Airbase
**Defunct**			
Ulcinj	none	none	Ulcinj Airport

== See also ==
- Transport in Montenegro
- List of airports by ICAO code: L#LY – Serbia and Montenegro
- Wikipedia:WikiProject Aviation/Airline destination lists: Europe#Montenegro
