= Mrčevac =

Mrčevac Мрчевац
- Village
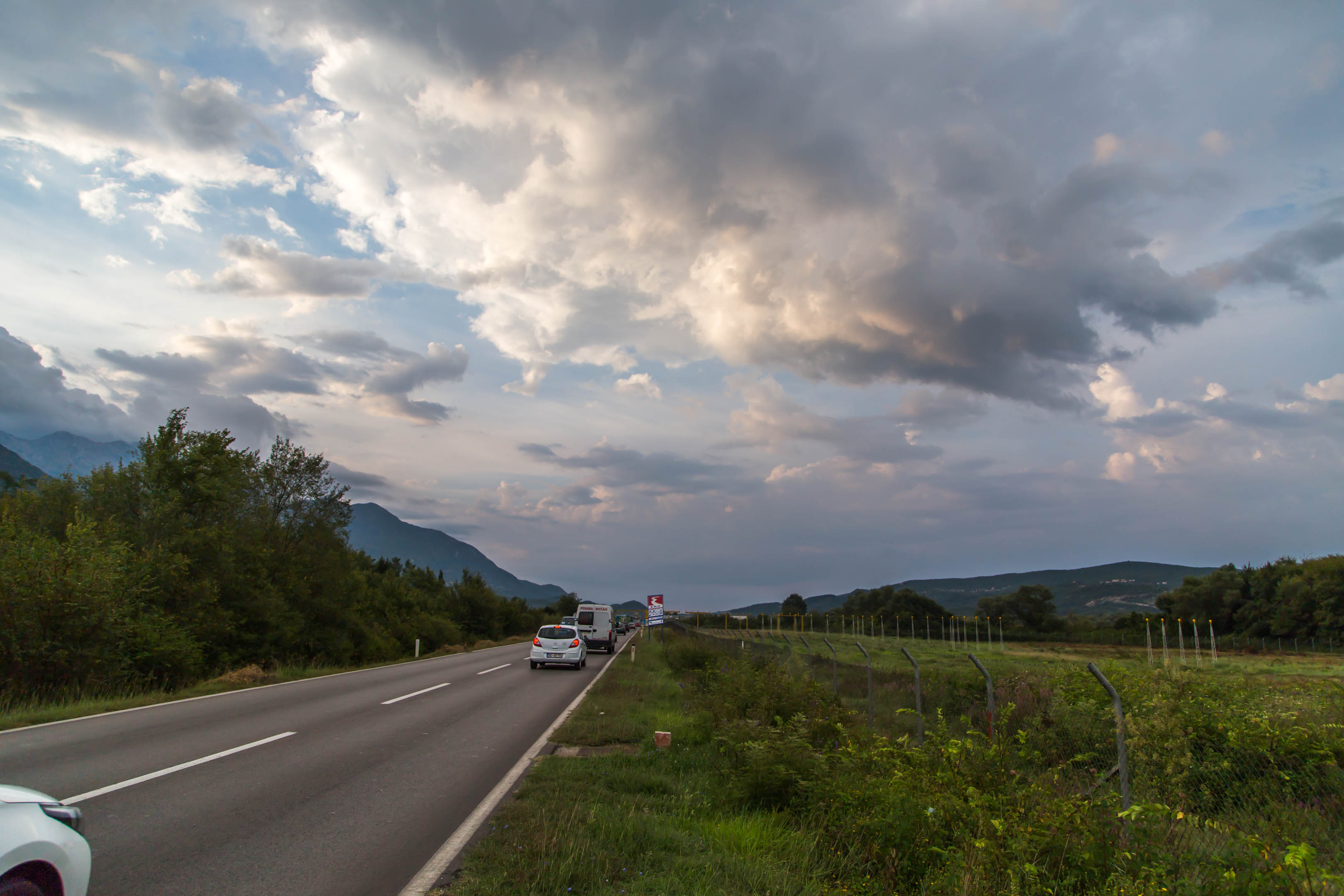
- Mrčevac

- Location within Montenegro
- Country: Montenegro
- Region: Coastal
- Municipality: Tivat

Population (2011)
  - Total: 2,110
- Time zone: UTC+1 (CET)
  - Summer (DST): UTC+2 (CEST)

Mrčevac (Montenegrin: Мрчевац) is a village in the municipality of Tivat, Montenegro.

== Demographics ==
According to the 2011 census, it had a population of 2,110 people.

Ethnicity in 2011
Ethnicity	Number	Percentage
Montenegrins	764	36.2%
Serbs	602	28.5%
Croats	191	9.1%
Albanians	65	3.0%
other/undeclared	488	23.1%
Total	2110	100%

== See also ==
- Tivat-Mrčevac Airport
