= Tivat Airport =

Tivat Airport Aerodrom Tivat
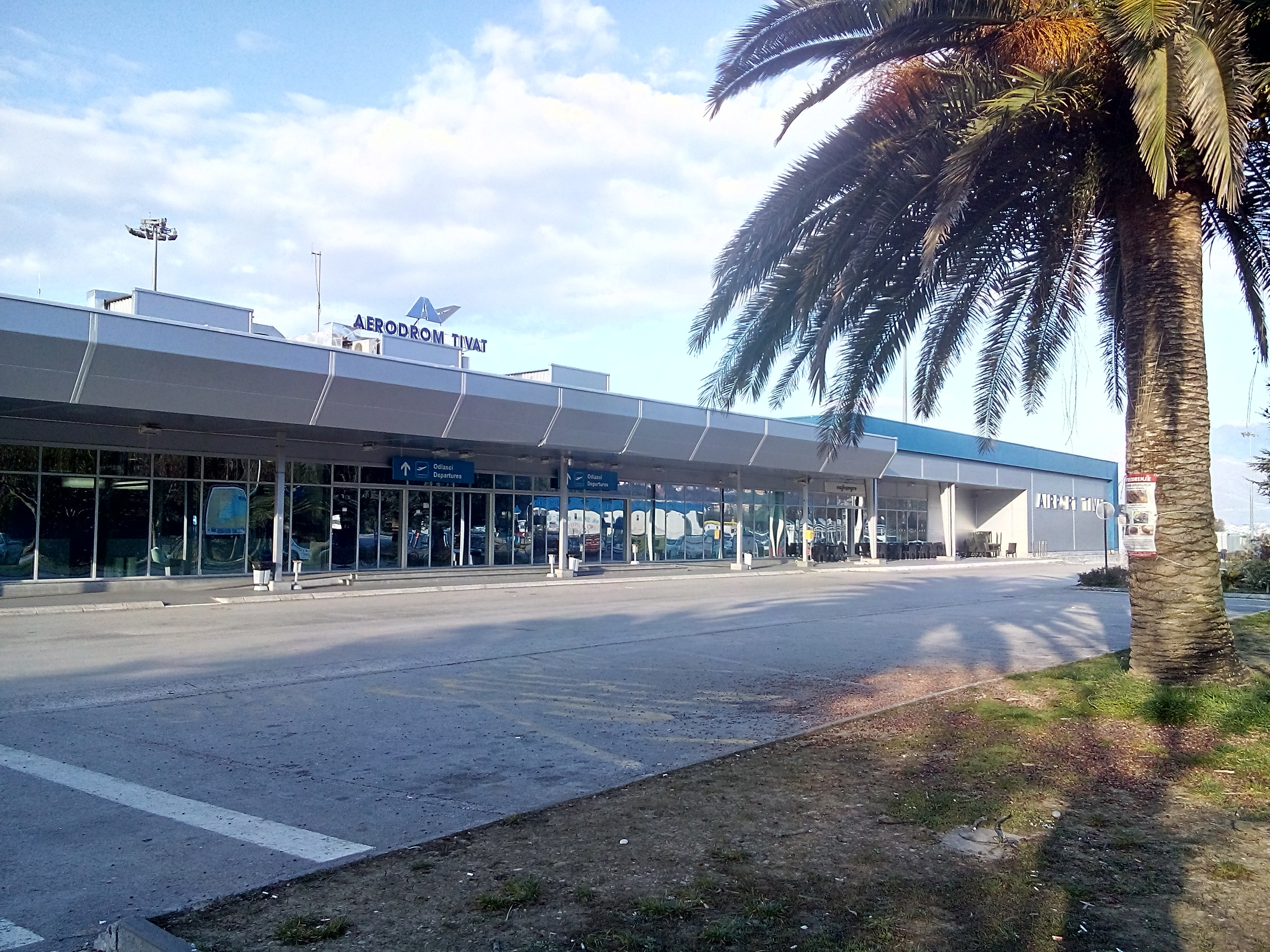
- IATA: TIV; ICAO: LYTV

Summary
- Airport type: Public
- Operator: Airports of Montenegro
- Serves: Tivat
- Location: Mrčevac, Montenegro
- Hub for: Air Montenegro
- Elevation AMSL: 20 ft (6.1 m)
- Coordinates: 42°24′17″N 18°43′24″E
- Website: montenegroairports.com/en/tivat-airport/

Map
- Location of airport in Montenegro

Runways
Direction	Length		Surface
Direction	ft	m	Surface
14/32	8,202	2,500	Asphalt

Statistics (2024)
- Number of passengers: 1,343,565 ▲19%
- Source: Airports of Montenegro

Tivat Airport (Serbian Cyrillic: Аеродром Тиват, romanized: Aerodrom Tivat) (IATA: TIV, ICAO: LYTV) is an international airport serving the Montenegrin coastal town of Tivat and the surrounding region.

The airport is situated 3 km (1.9 mi) south of the centre of Tivat, with the runway aligned with the Tivat Field (Тиватско поље / Tivatsko polje).

It is one of two international airports in Montenegro, the other being Podgorica Airport. Traffic at the airport follows the highly seasonal nature of the tourism industry in coastal Montenegro, with 80% of the total volume of passengers being handled during the peak season (May–September).

== History ==
Tivat Airport was opened on 30 May 1957, featuring a 1,200 meters (3,900 ft) long grass runway, small apron, passenger terminal building and control tower. Initially, the airport served mainly domestic passenger traffic, with flights to Belgrade, Zagreb and Skopje being operated by JAT, using Douglas DC-3 and Ilyushin Il-14 aircraft.

From 1968 to 1971, the airport underwent major expansion and modernization. It was reopened on 25 September 1971, sporting a 2,500 m × 45 m (8,202 ft × 148 ft) asphalt runway, extended apron and new passenger terminal. Another expansion of airport facilities ensued after it was damaged by the 1979 earthquake.

On 23 April 2003, the ownership of the airport was transferred from Jat Airways to Airports of Montenegro, a public company owned by the government of Montenegro. The airport underwent passenger terminal reconstruction in 2006.

As noise pollution increasingly became an issue in the mid-2000s, older airliners were permanently banned from using the airport, with loud widebodies such as Ilyushin Il-86 being redirected to Podgorica Airport.

Expansion of the passenger terminal building was completed in December 2018. However, airport facilities struggle to service growing passenger volume during the peak summer season, which results in frequent overcrowding.

== Overview ==
Tivat Airport is located in the Mrčevac settlement, on the southern outskirts of Tivat urban area, 7 km (4 mi) from the Kotor city center, and 20 km (12 mi) north-west of Budva. The passenger terminal is served by Adriatic Highway (E65/E80).

The airport is situated within Tivatsko polje (Tivat field), a valley surrounded by mountainous terrain, stretching in southeasterly direction from the city of Tivat. The airport's runway is aligned with the valley's orientation, with runway 14's threshold being just 100 m (328 ft) from the Bay of Kotor coastline.

Runway 32 approach requires a descent into Tivatsko polje, and a 20° turn for runway alignment just before landing. Due to this demanding approach procedure, Tivat Airport is known among pilots as the "Kai Tak of Europe". As of 2024, the runway 14 approach is no longer included in charts, as it included an even more challenging circle-to-land maneuver.

The airport is frequented by plane spotters, due to its easy access and unobstructed views of the runway, as well as the dramatic mountain backdrop.

Tivat Airport has a highly seasonal traffic pattern, with more than 80% of passenger traffic concentrated in the May-September period.

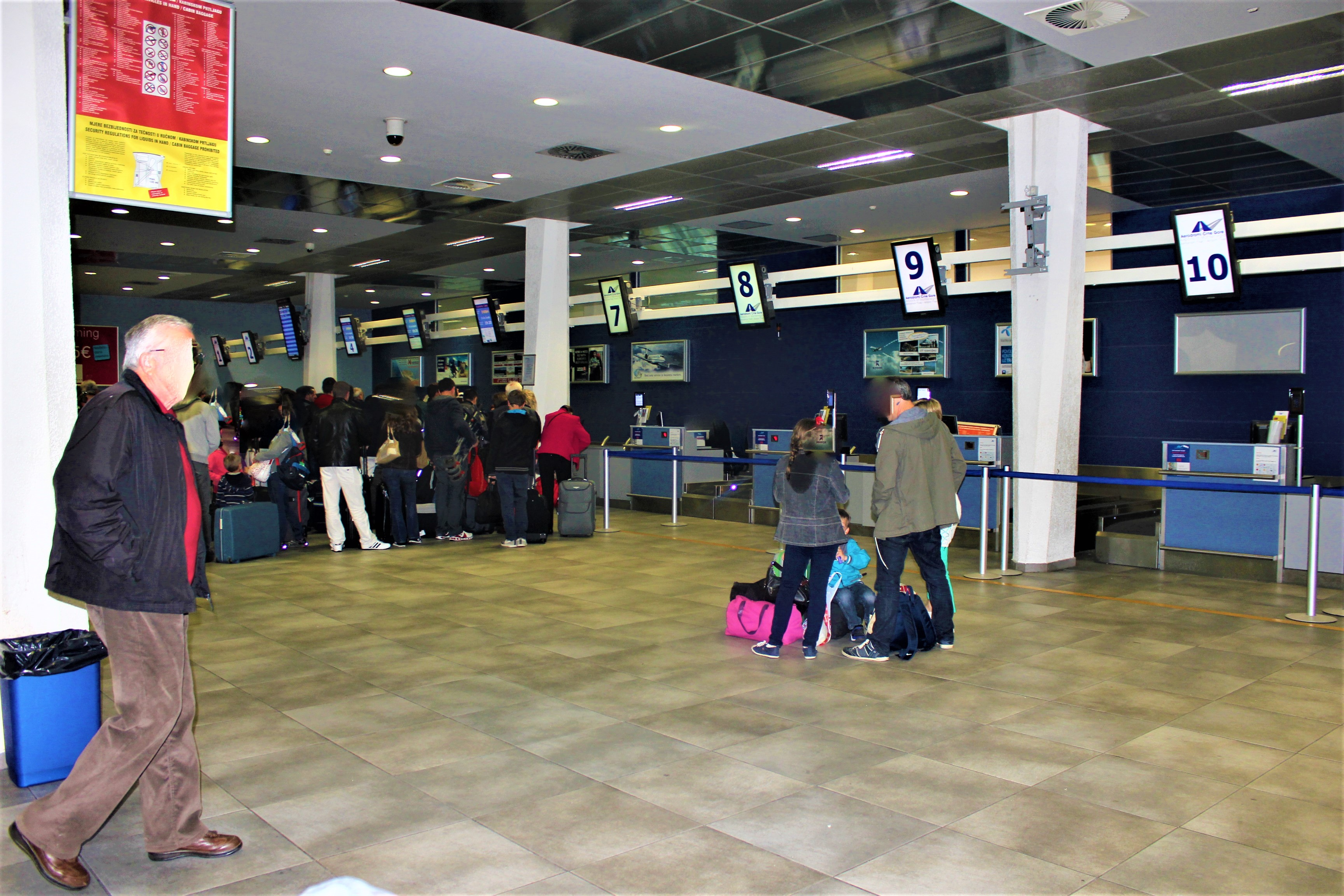
Tivat Airport terminal - check-in area

== Airlines and destinations ==
Below is a list of scheduled services throughout all seasons from Tivat Airport according to the Montenegrin Airports Authority:

Airlines	Destinations
Air Montenegro	Belgrade, Istanbul; Seasonal: Banja Luka, Brno, Prague
Air Serbia	Belgrade; Seasonal: Kraljevo, Niš
AirBaltic	Seasonal: Riga
Arkia	Seasonal: Tel Aviv
Austrian Airlines	Seasonal: Vienna
Avion Express	Seasonal charter: Vilnius
Azerbaijan Airlines	Seasonal: Baku
British Airways	Seasonal: London–Heathrow
EasyJet	Seasonal: Amsterdam (begins 29 June 2027), Basel/Mulhouse (begins 30 June 2027), Berlin, Birmingham (begins 3 May 2027), Bristol, Edinburgh (begins 29 March 2027), Geneva, London–Gatwick, London–Luton, Manchester
Edelweiss Air	Seasonal: Zurich
Eurowings	Seasonal: Berlin, Düsseldorf, Stuttgart
Flydubai	Seasonal: Dubai–International
FlyOne	Yerevan; Seasonal: Chișinău
Heston Airlines	Seasonal charter: Riga, Tallinn, Vilnius
Iberia	Seasonal: Madrid
Israir	Tel Aviv
Jet2.com	Seasonal: Birmingham, Leeds/Bradford (begins 10 May 2027), London–Stansted, Manchester
LOT Polish Airlines	Seasonal charter: Warsaw–Chopin
Lufthansa	Seasonal: Frankfurt, Munich
Luxair	Seasonal: Luxembourg
Norwegian Air Shuttle	Seasonal: Copenhagen, Helsinki, Oslo, Riga
Scandinavian Airlines	Seasonal: Copenhagen, Oslo, Stockholm–Arlanda
SkyUp	Seasonal: Chișinău
Sundor	Seasonal: Tel Aviv
Transavia	Seasonal: Paris–Orly
TUI fly Belgium	Seasonal: Brussels
TUI fly Netherlands	Seasonal: Amsterdam
Turkish Airlines	Seasonal: Istanbul
Vueling	Seasonal: Barcelona

== Statistics ==
Traffic figures at Tivat Airport
Year	Passengers	Change
2005	377,013	
2006	451,289	▲20%
2007	573,914	▲27%
2008	570,636	▼1%
2009	532,080	▼7%
2010	541,870	▲2%
2011	647,184	▲19%
2012	725,412	▲12%
2013	868,343	▲20%
2014	910,264	▲5%
2015	895,050	▼2%
2016	979,432	▲10%
2017	1,129,720	▲15%
2018	1,245,999	▲10%
2019	1,367,282	▲10%
2020	189,815	▼86%
2021	671,333	▲254%
2022	652,711	▼3%
2023	848,188	▲30%
2024	1,124,203	▲32%
2025	1,343,565	▲19%

=== Busiest routes ===
Busiest routes from Tivat Airport (2023)
Rank	Airport	Passengers 2023
1	Serbia, Belgrade	306,390
2	Turkey, Istanbul Airport	99,154
3	Israel, Tel Aviv Airport	60,105
4	United Kingdom, London Gatwick Airport	34,783
5	Lithuania, Vilnius Airport	31,252
Source: ec.europa.eu

== See also ==
- Aeronautical Information Publication
