= Kojetice (Mělník District) =

- Municipality
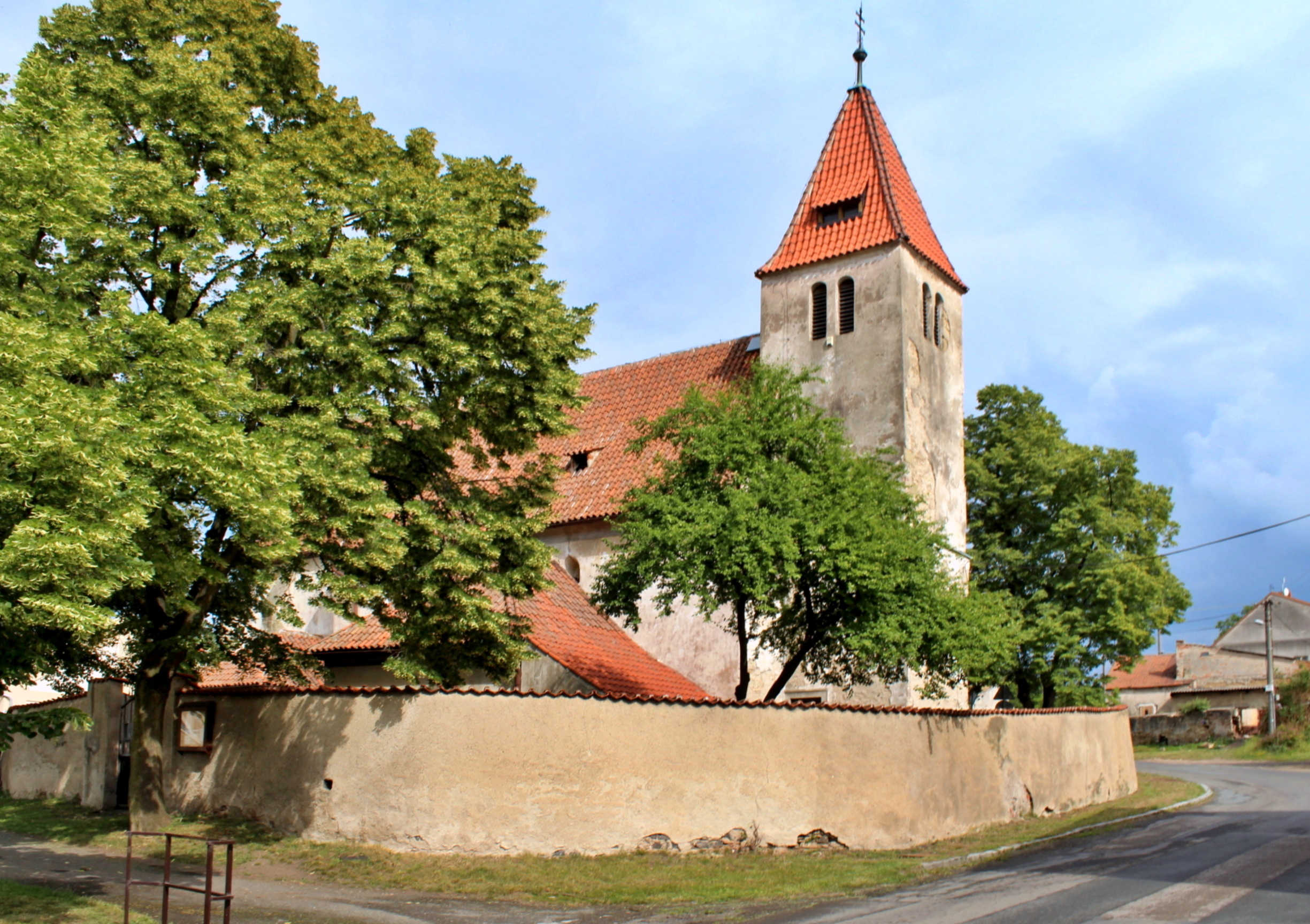
- Church of Saint Vitus

- Flag Coat of arms

- Location in the Czech Republic
- Coordinates: 50°14′17″N 14°30′31″E
- Country: Czech Republic
- Region: Central Bohemian
- District: Mělník
- First mentioned: 1271

Area
  - Total: 5.58 km^{2} (2.15 sq mi)
- Elevation: 215 m (705 ft)

Population (2026-01-01)
  - Total: 1,050
  - Density: 188/km^{2} (487/sq mi)
- Time zone: UTC+1 (CET)
  - Summer (DST): UTC+2 (CEST)
- Postal code: 250 72
- Website: www.kojetice.cz

Kojetice is a municipality and village in Mělník District in the Central Bohemian Region of the Czech Republic. It has about 1,100 inhabitants.

== History ==
The first written mention of Kojetice is from 1271.

== Demographics ==
Historical population
Year	Pop.	±%
1869	370	—
1880	415	+12.2%
1890	393	−5.3%
1900	362	−7.9%
1910	398	+9.9%
1921	493	+23.9%
1930	809	+64.1%
1950	622	−23.1%
1961	729	+17.2%
1970	759	+4.1%
1980	724	−4.6%
1991	638	−11.9%
2001	627	−1.7%
2011	741	+18.2%
2021	811	+9.4%
Source: Censuses
