= Subdivisions of Podgorica =

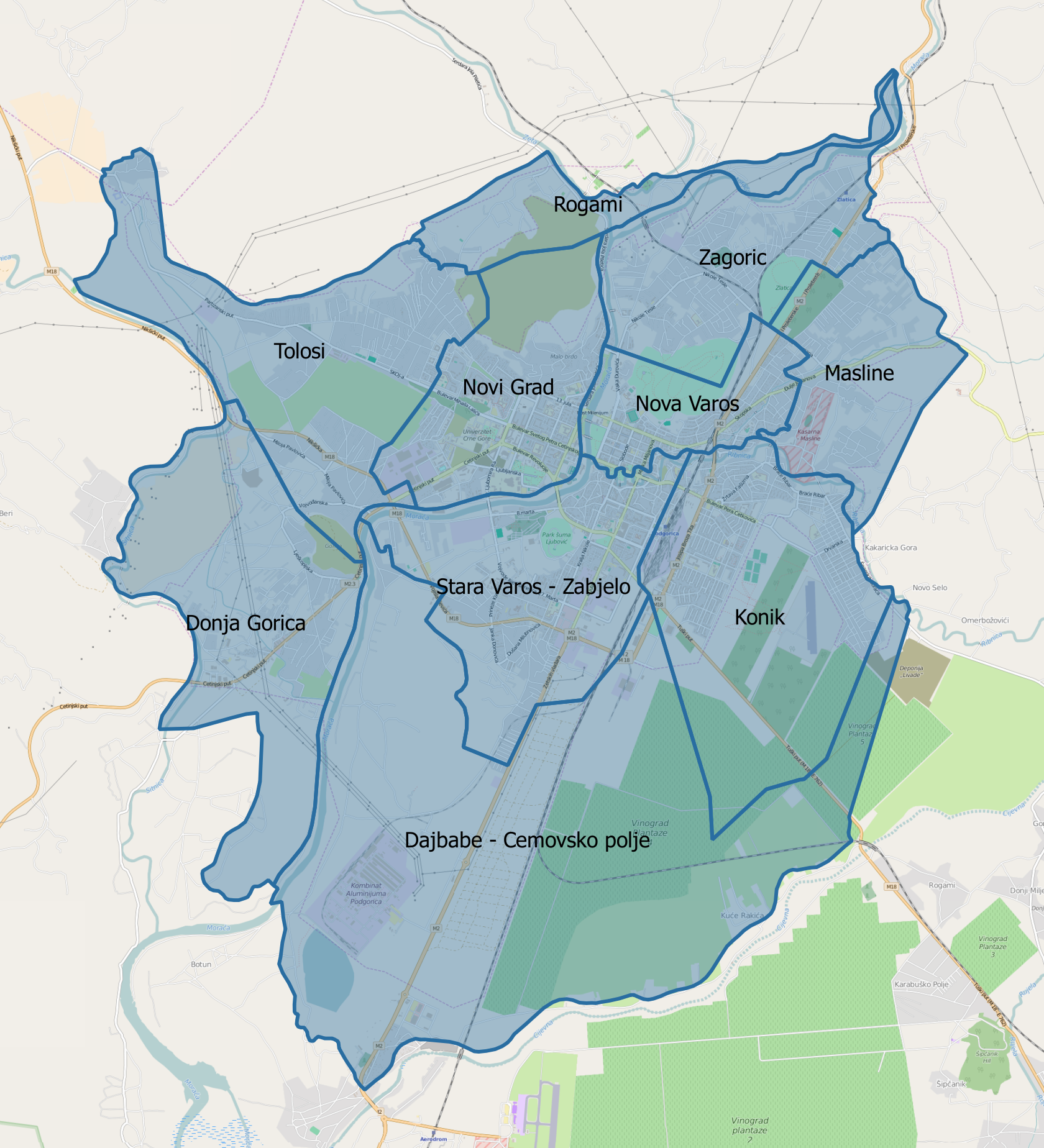
Podgorica urban subdivisions

Municipality of Podgorica (Montenegrin: Opština Podgorica / Општина Подгорица) is divided into 57 local communities (Montenegrin Latin: mjesne zajednice, singular: mjesna zajednica), bodies in which the citizens participate in making decisions about matters of relevance to the community in which they live.

In 2022, two city municipalities (Montenegrin Latin: gradske opštine, singular: gradska opština) were separated from the municipality of Podgorica. The Tuzi Municipality and the Zeta Municipality now function independently from Podgorica Capital City.

There are also unofficial neighbourhoods and suburbs of Podgorica. There are many different interpretations on boundaries and existence of certain neighbourhoods, as neighbourhood is not an administrative category, but unofficial geographical notion.

== Local communities within the municipality of Podgorica ==
=== Urban communities ===
Urban Local Communities within the municipality of Podgorica are subdivisions of urban area of Podgorica.

- 1. maj (1 May)
- 19. decembar (19 December)
- Blok V
- Blok VI
- Blok IX
- Dahna
- Donja Gorica (Lower Gorica)
- Donji Kokoti (Lower Kokoti)
- Drač
- Gornja Gorica (Upper Gorica)
- Ibričevina
- Jedinstvo (Unity)
- Konik
- Kruševac
- Ljubović
- Masline (Olives)
- Međeđak
- Momišići
- Murtovina
- Nova Varoš (New Town)
- Pobrežje
- Proleter
- Sadine
- Stara Varoš (Old Town)
- Stara Zlatica (Old Zlatica)
- Stari Aerodrom (Old Airport)
- Tološi I
- Tološi II
- Vranići
- Vrela Ribnička (Ribnica springs)
- Zagorič
- Zlatica

=== Rural communities ===
Rural Local Communities of Podgorica are subdivisions of the part of Municipality of Podgorica outside of city of Podgorica.

- Barutana (Gunpowder mill)
- Beri
- Bioče
- Buronje
- Brskut
- Dajbabe
- Doljani
- Gradac
- Lijeva Rijeka (Left River)
- Liješnje
- Lješkopolje
- Nadno Liješnja
- Pelev Brijeg
- Rogami
- Stijena (The Rock)
- Trmanje
- Tuzi Ljevorječke
- Ubli
- Velje Brdo (Big Hill)

== Centar ==
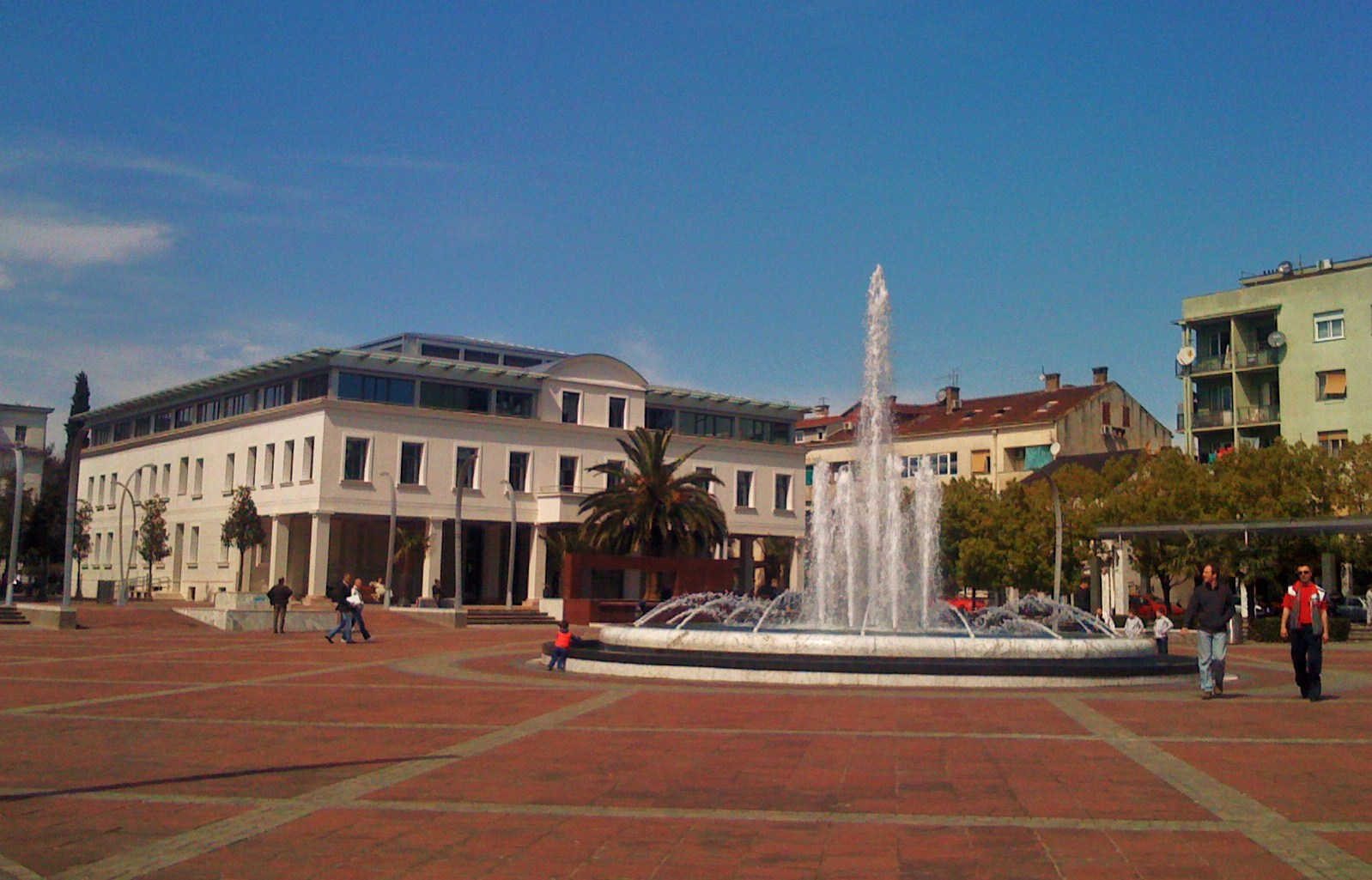
Independence square

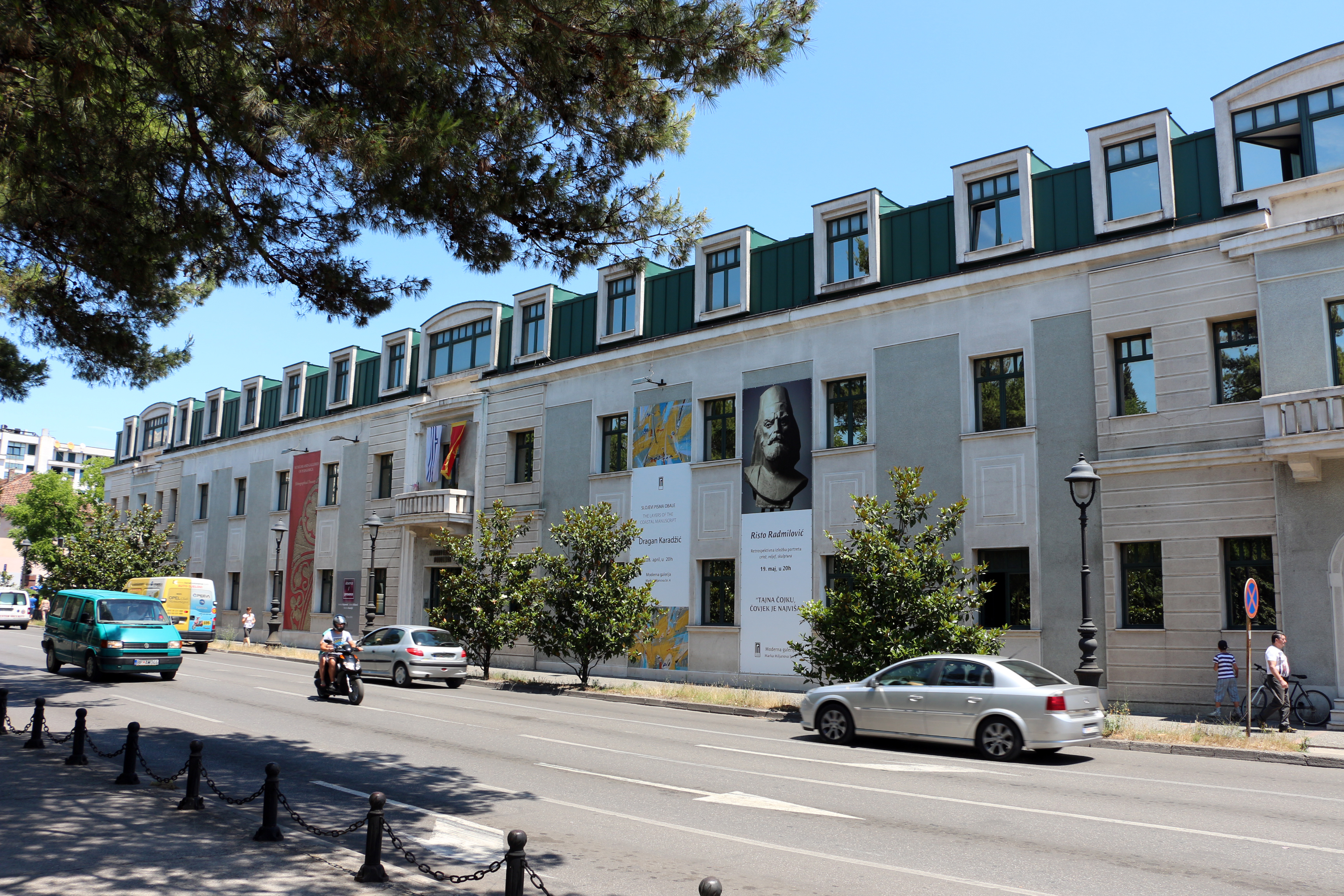
Podgorica City Museum

Historically known as Nova Varoš ("New Town"), this neighbourhood roughly corresponds to the traditional city centre of Podgorica. It is bounded by Ivana Crnojevića Boulevard to the north, Svetog Petra Cetinjskog Boulevard to the south, Stanka Dragojevića Boulevard to the west, and Ribnica River to the east.

It is the administrative, as well as socio-cultural heart of the city. Parliament of Montenegro, Central Bank of Montenegro, Montenegrin National Theatre and Podgorica City Assembly are located within this part of town. It is also home to most of Podgorica's cafés, nightclubs and retail establishments. Hercegovačka Street and Slobode Street, the city's main promenades, are completely within the city centre. Independence Square, traditionally considered the heart of Podgorica, is positioned at the centre of this neighbourhood.

Architecturally, the neighbourhood is a mix of typical Montenegrin interwar housing, and SFRY-era high-rises which filled in vacant lots that remained after the World War II devastation.

The city centre saw heavy investments in recent years, in order to make it a presentable city centre for a state capital.

== Preko Morače ==
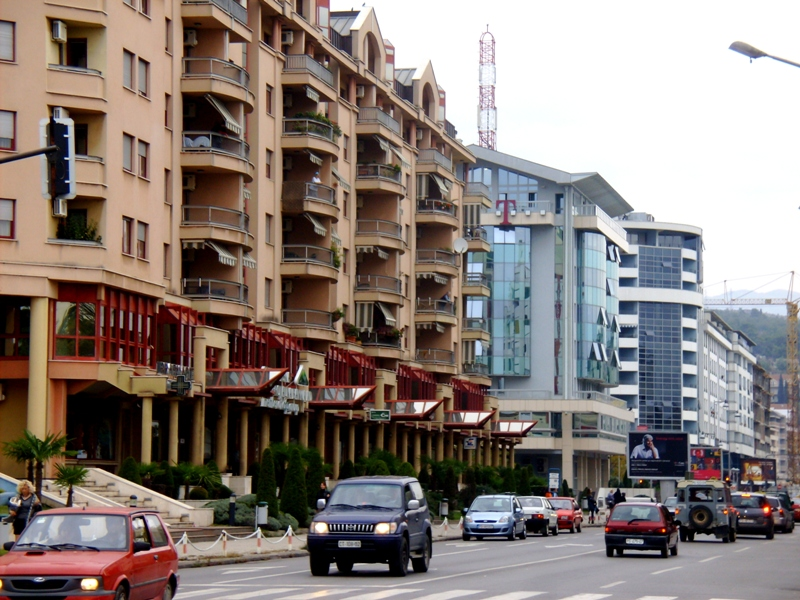
Moskovska (Moscow) Street

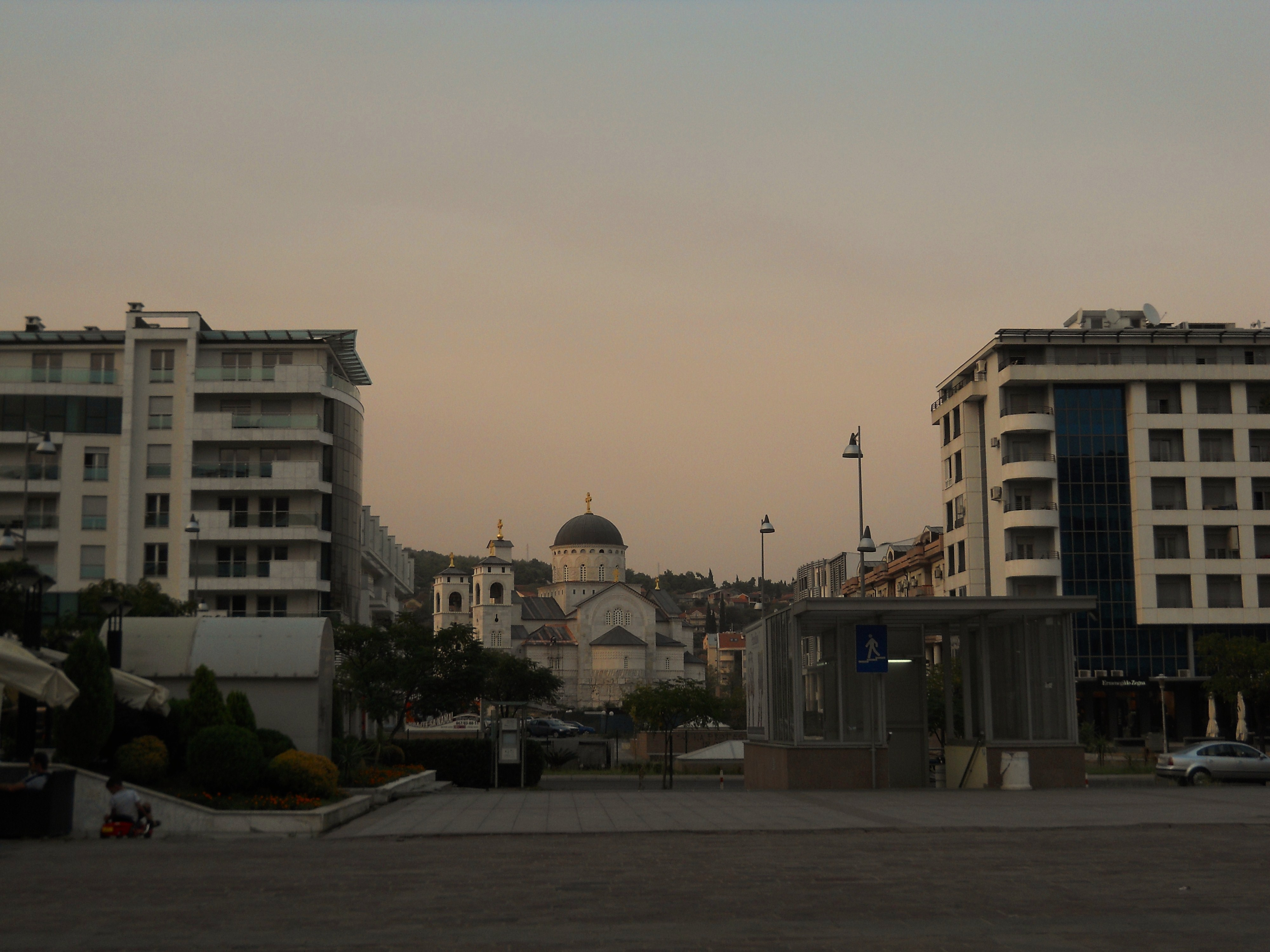
Cathedral of the Resurrection of Christ

The neighbourhood's name, Preko Morače, literally translates to "Across the Morača River", which refers to its location, across the river, relative to the city centre. The majority of the neighbourhood was built right after World War II, incorporating basic residential buildings typical for post-World War II FPR Yugoslavia (mostly 5-6 story multiple-entrance wide pavilions in addition to a few single-entrance buildings up to 10 stories). Originally, it housed the families of Yugoslav People's Army (JNA) personnel and other state officials, although this has changed in recent years, as many original owners sold their apartments.

Svetog Petra Cetinjskog Boulevard in this part of town is favourite promenade of Podgorica citizens, and is lined with numerous cafes and restaurants. This part of town is also home to the various Government ministries and agencies and Morača Sports Center.

=== Kruševac and Vectra area ===
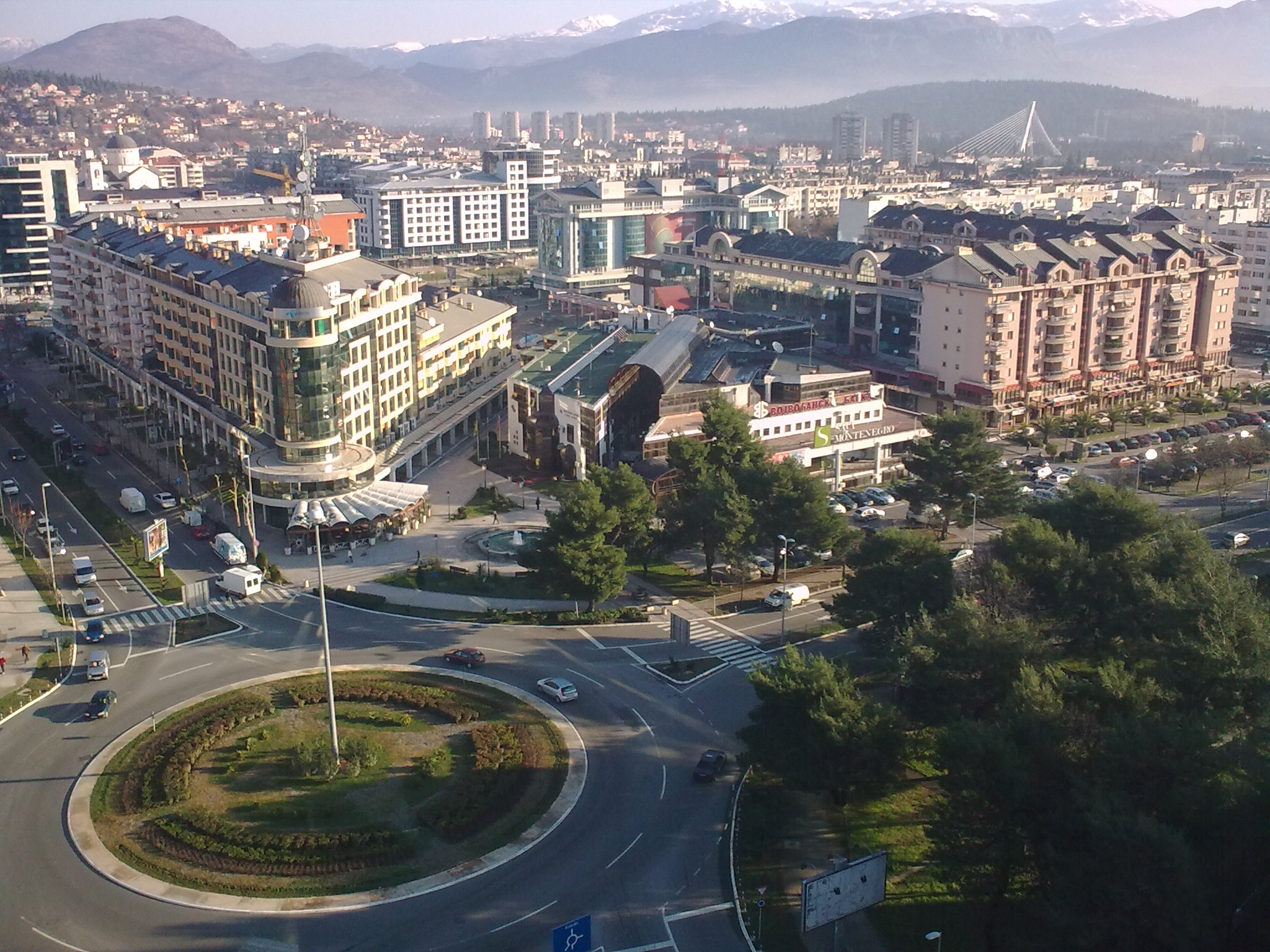

Kruševac settlement is an extension of Preko Morače neighbourhood. It extends to the southwest of the Boulevard of the Revolution, and is home to Clinical centre of Montenegro, RTCG building, National Security Agency of Montenegro and Kruševac Park (also known as Park Petrovića), arguably the most beautiful and spacious public park in Podgorica.

Vectra area got its name after the company that built the first building in this part of Preko Morače. The area is located around the Roman Square (colloquially known as Vectra square). It is bound by Svetog Petra Cetinjskog Boulevard on the north, Moskovska Street on the east, Revolucije Boulevard on the south, and Džordža Vašingtona Boulevard on the west. It is the location of headquarters Montenegrin telecommunication carriers, numerous banks, two luxury hotels and vast number of exclusive cafes, restaurants and boutiques. St. Peter of Cetinje Square and Cetinjski Put boulevard extend to the west from the neighbourhood, and are home to Altas Capital Center and BIG Fashion shopping mall. This neighbourhood is sometimes referred to as the New Podgorica centre and boasts some of the highest real-estate prices in Podgorica.

== Blok 5, Blok 6, and Blok 9 ==
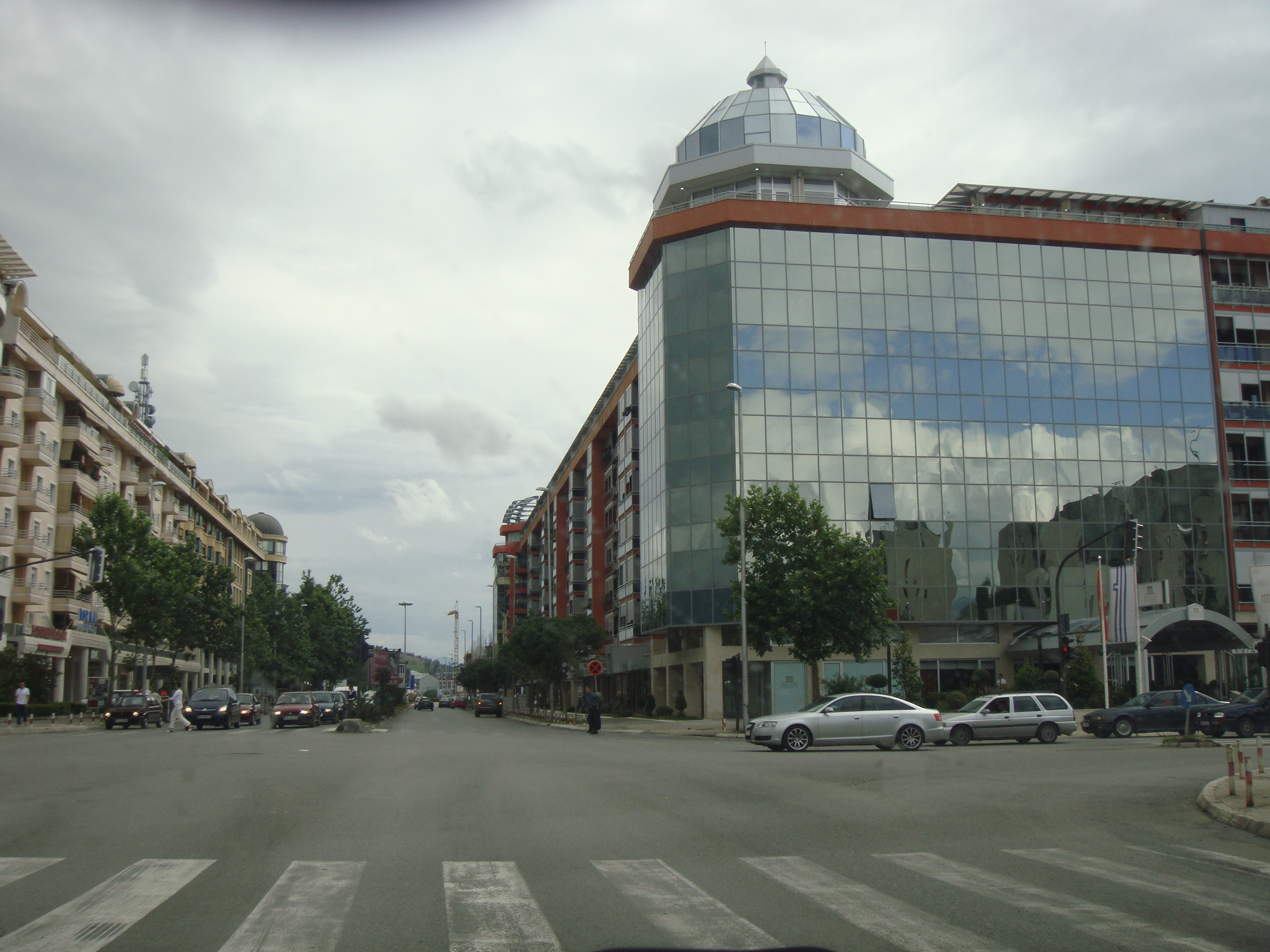
George Washington Boulevard

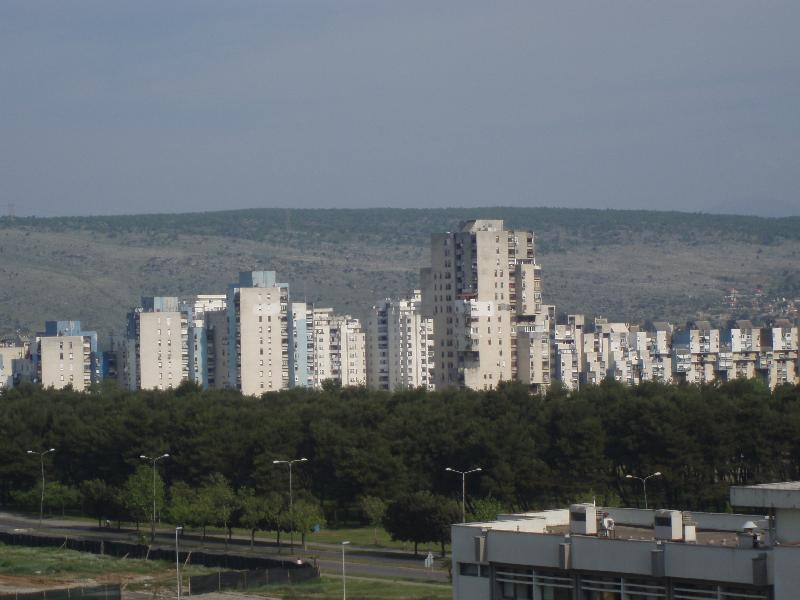
Buildings at Blok 5 and 6

Residential blocks 5, 6 and 9 are the only neighbourhoods that kept the Blok designation as their common name, in contrast to other newer parts of town, that got other nicknames.

Blocks 5, 6 and 9 are bounded by St. Peter of Cetinje Boulevard on the south, George Washington Boulevard on the east, Dalmatinska Street on the north, and blend with Tološi neighbourhood on the west.

The Blocks are relatively new, as construction started in 1980s. They consist of high-rise residential buildings, up to 16 stories high. Many consider Blocks the most family-friendly parts of town, as they have vast pedestrian-only spaces, many playgrounds, sports fields and greenery. They also incorporate wide streets, and relatively enough parking spaces, a rarity in today's Podgorica.

== Tološi ==
Tološi is the westernmost part of Podgorica, and an extension of Blok 5-6-9 area. A low-rise residential neighbourhood, it is mostly located between Dalmatinska and SKOJ-a streets. Before its development began, it was a physically detached suburb of Podgorica with mostly rural features. This neglect from the urban planning point of view resulted in poor infrastructure, a problem evident even today as it's still rare to find a street in Tološi that has features such as sidewalks or drainage system.

== Momišići ==
Momišići neighbourhood curves around the foot of Malo Brdo ("Little Hill"), and also up its southeastern slopes. It consists mostly of lowrise private family houses, except in its southern tip, which is home to University of Montenegro's Faculty of Economics and Faculty of Law buildings, Podgorica Basic Court, and various residential high-rises.

== Gornja Gorica and Donja Gorica ==
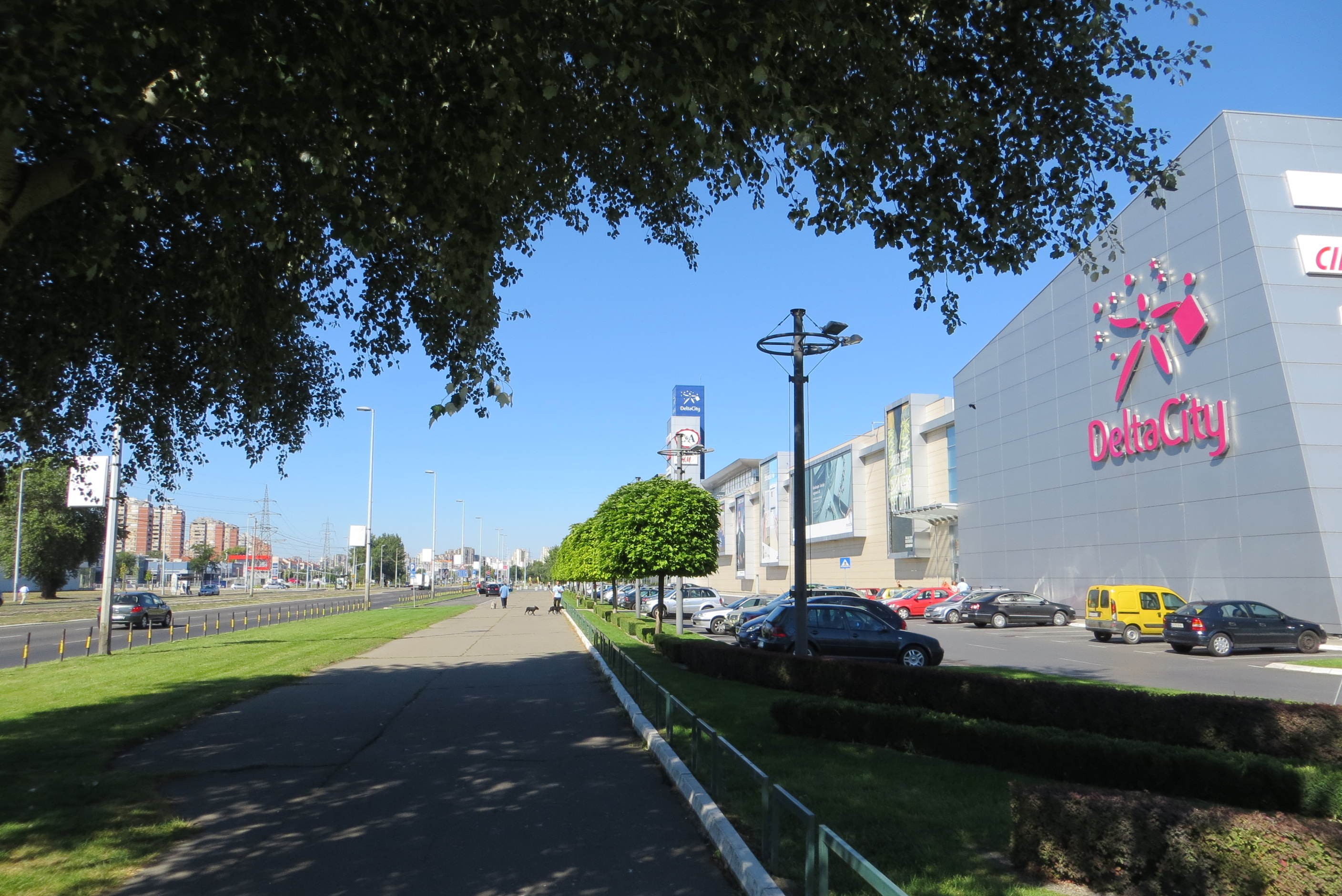

Gornja Gorica and Donja Gorica are named after the hill that separates them. However, There are two hills named Gorica in Podgorica: one overlooking the very city center, and one 4 km to the west, on the southwestern outskirts of the city. For easier orientation, they will be referred to as Central Gorica Hill, and West Gorica Hill in the text below.

Gornja Gorica ("Upper Gorica") is a neighbourhood located to the north of Cetinjski Road, and north of West Gorica Hill. It is a residential neighbourhood, except for the strip surrounding Cetinjski Road, which is packed with commercial facilities, such as BIG Fashion Podgorica.

Donja Gorica ("Lower Gorica") is a neighbourhood which stretches along the road towards Cetinje, south of West Gorica Hill. It can be considered a suburb, due to its physical detachment from the rest of the city. It consists mostly of lowrise residential developments, except the part by the highway, which has a number of stores and warehouses.

As with Tološi, the residential part of those neighbourhoods developed in a spontaneous and informal way, resulting in winding and narrow streets between the private housing.

== Pod Goricom ==
Pod Goricom is an urban neighbourhood that is located on the southeastern slopes of Central Gorica Hill, and is an extension to the city centre. It is known as exclusive residential neighbourhood, especially the section designated Gorica C. It is a residence of choice for majority of politicians and Montenegrin nouveau riche, as well as Podgorica City Stadium (Pod Goricom Stadium).

== Zagorič ==
Full article

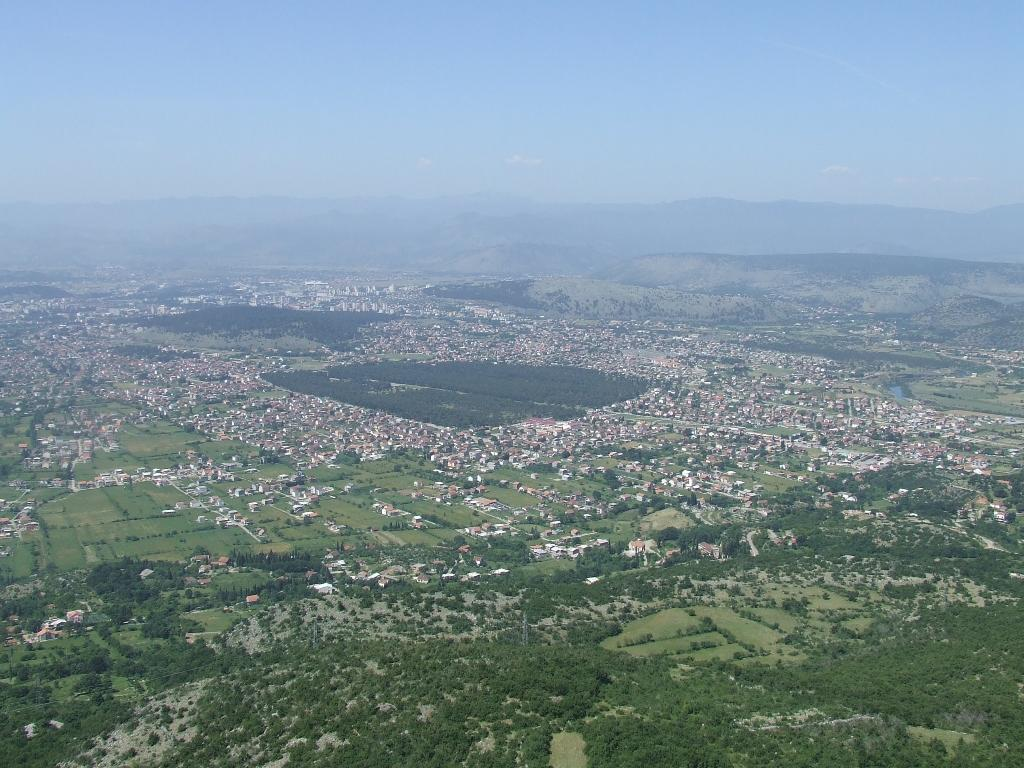
Zagorič, Masline, and Zlatica residential areas

Zagorič is the part of town located north of Central Gorica Hill. Its name is derived from the expression Iza Gorice ("Behind Gorica"). It is entirely lowrise residential area.

== Zlatica and Masline ==
Zlatica and Masline are entirely residential neighbourhoods in northeast Podgorica. Zlatica stretches along the motorway towards Kolašin, while Masline are south to the Zlatica, and north of Ribnica River. Masline is home to the biggest army camp within Municipality of Podgorica.

All characteristics that apply to Tološi and Gorica's can be found in Zlatica and Masline, especially lack of urban planning in some areas.

== Konik ==
Konik is a residential neighbourhood, almost entirely lowrise, in Podgorica's eastern part. Its most distinctive feature is that it is home to Podgorica's Romani minority, and has the image of an underdeveloped part of town. However, construction boom in the late 2000s has benefited Konik, as its proximity to the city center has made it attractive for development. Konik is home to the only Catholic church in Podgorica.

== Vrela Ribnička ==
Vrela Ribnice, or Vrela Ribnička is an extension of Konik to the south-east. This easternmost Podgorica neighbourhood is home to a large Roma population, as well as to refugees and displaced persons from Yugoslav wars. In contrast to most other Podgorica lowrise residential neighbourhoods, Vrela Ribnička has been built according to strict grid plan. However, infrastructure of the area is still underdeveloped. On its southeastern tip, it features a refugee camp, mostly settled by displaced persons from Yugoslav wars, city landfills and many garbage processing facilities.

== Drač and Stara Varoš ==
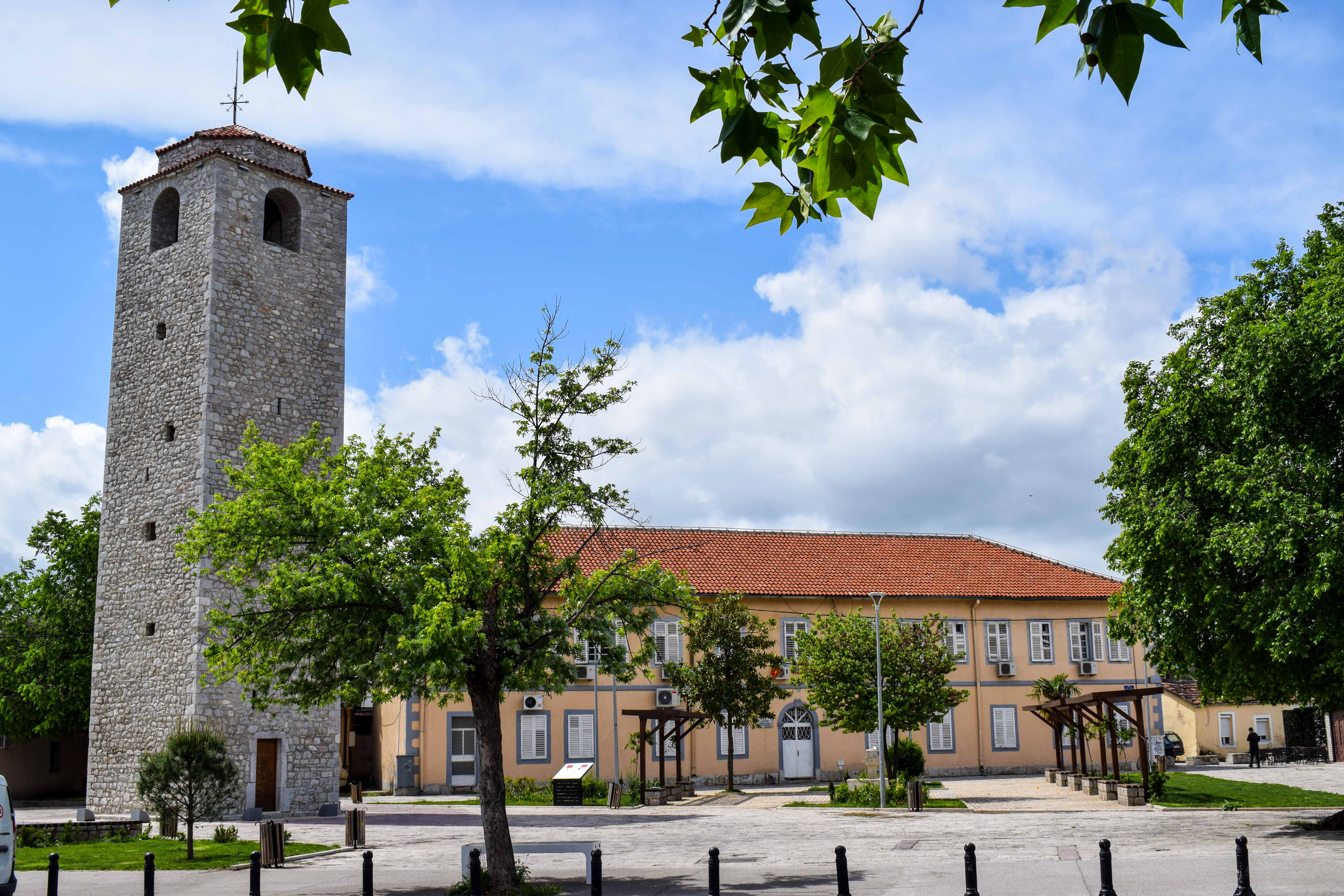
Stara Varoš

Drač and Stara Varoš ("Old Town") are parts of town located south-east to the confluence of Ribnica and Morača rivers. Stara Varoš's boundaries are Morača and Ribnica rivers, Kralja Nikole street, and Crnogorskih Serdara boulevard. Drač is bounded by Belgrade - Bar railway, Oktobarske Revolucije street, Pete Proleterske Boulevard and Bratstva - Jedinstva street. They formed one compact neighbourhood before World War II, but since then they were split with highrise apartment blocks, built during SFRY.

They are a historical core of the city, and are the last remnants of Ottoman architecture in Podgorica. Stara Varoš is home to Podgorica's two mosques and Turkish clock tower. Both neighbourhoods are mostly residential, and incorporate narrow and curvy streets, typical for old Turkish town. Unlike Baščaršija and similar examples, Ottoman heritage of Podgorica has not been preserved well, and old Ottoman housing is mixed with newer developments throughout the neighbourhoods. Thus, touristic potential diminished, and economic activity in the area has plummeted, with development of newer neighbourhoods. Because of this, Drač and Stara Varoš remain neglected residential areas, despite their central location and historical significance.

== Zabjelo ==
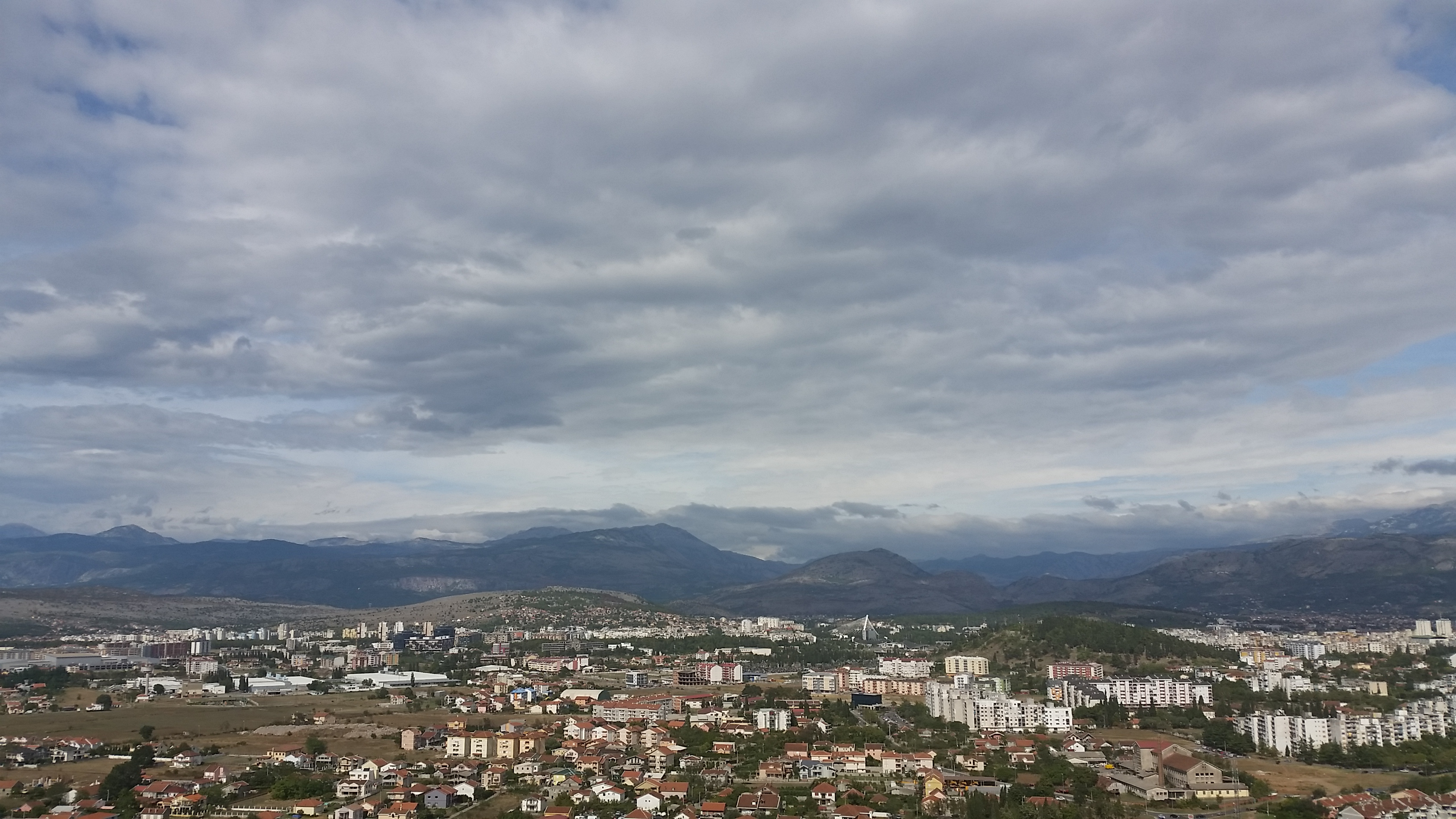

Zabjelo is a large neighbourhood in southern Podgorica. It is located to the south of Ljubović hill, Bracana Bracanovića street and west of 4th July street. It is the southernmost neighbourhood of Podgorica, and largest one by area. It is uncertain whether the smaller neighbourhoods such as Pobrežje and Zelenika could be considered a part of Zabjelo. Official stance of Zabjelo locals is - that they are, when speaking to people from other parts of the city, trying to emphasize how big is their neighbourhood. But, when speaking with inhabitants from Pobrežje and Zelenika - true Zabjelo local would strongly deny any links.

Zabjelo is known by its characteristic subculture. Zabjelo's residents are known for their casual and laid-back lifestyle, and particularly for their strong native identity and appreciation for their neighbourhood as well as humorous critical attitude towards other nicer parts of the town. Zabjelo has no distinctive landmarks, the infrastructure is considered normal, it is mostly loved by its residents. A locally famous organization called "The Republic of Zabjelo" has existed since 12 September 1991, and among its "demands" is the secession of Zabjelo from the Republic of Montenegro, which was a provocative response to the breakup of the former Socialist Federative Republic of Yugoslavia. Most of the people from this organization were affiliated with the first urban initiatives in Podgorica - such as radio Antena M and Omladinski grafiti magazine.

Zabjelo was originally a hard-core workers' suburb, but after the 1990s and construction boom in Podgorica it saw strong urban development. Now it is dominated by residential buildings for mid-income families. However, unlike Blok 5 and Preko Morače, Zabjelo has pockets of lowrise residential areas. Over time the local way of life has changed from a raw and hostile neighbourhood into a generally calm and easy-going part of the city.

== Stari Aerodrom ==
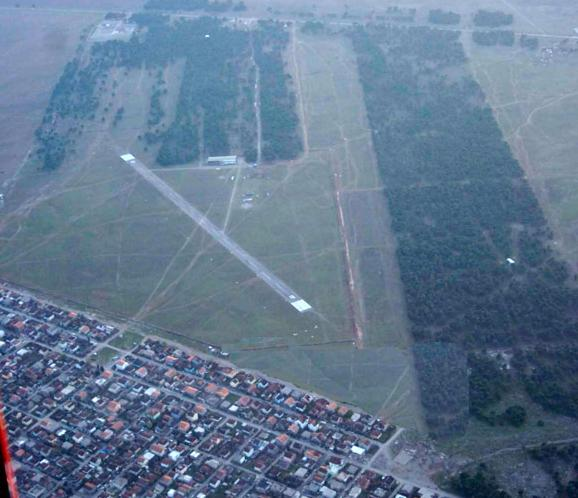
Špiro Mugoša Airport

Stari Aerodrom ("Old Airport") is a neighbourhood located between the Konik neighbourhood, Belgrade–Bar railway and the road towards Tuzi. It is relatively new part of town, and hence an entirely planned one. It consists of mixed highrise buildings and lowrise private dwellings, and boasts wide streets and good infrastructure. It now witnesses a construction boom as it has abundance of empty spaces for development, and is relatively well connected with the city centre. The neighbourhood houses the Albanian and Polish embassies to Montenegro, as well as the Coca-Cola bottling plant, owned by Coca-Cola HBC.

== Tuški put ==
Tuški put is a neighbourhood located east of 4th July street and south of Bracana Bracanovića street. The latter street extends towards town of Tuzi, hence the name Tuški put, which means Road of Tuzi.

Tuški put is a mixed commercial-residential neighbourhood, and was the location of the largest open marketplace in Podgorica. The marketplace has relocated to a section of Mall of Montenegro, but informal market still exists. The residential area is composed of basic residential buildings typical of SFRY-era. Next to Mall of Montenegro is Hotel Ramada and one small neighbourhood called Baston.
