= FK Napredak Donji Kokoti =

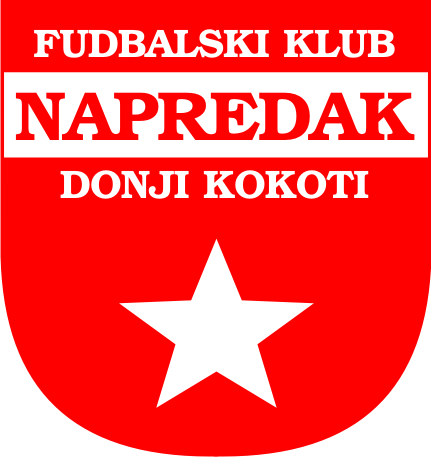
- Full name: Fudbalski klub Napredak Donji Kokoti
- Founded: 1973
- Dissolved: 1995
- Ground: Igralište Napretka, Donji Kokoti, Podgorica, Montenegro
- League: Yugoslavian Fourth League (Central region)
- 1993-94: 5th

FK Napredak Donji Kokoti or simply Napredak was a Montenegrin football club based in suburb of Podgorica named Donji Kokoti. The club was founded in 1973, and dissolved after the season 1993–94.

== History ==
Following the expansion of football, after 1970 in Podgorica region (then Titograd), especially in suburbs, were formed numerous amateur clubs, like FK Crvena Stijena from Tološi, Partizan from Momišići, Ribnica from Konik, Bratstvo from Cijevna, Avijatičar, Poštar from Stari Aerodrom, Metalac, Agrokombinat and others. Among them were two clubs from Lješkopolje region. First, at 1971, was founded FK Napredak from Donji Kokoti, and three years later Mladost Lješkopolje (present-day FK Podgorica).

Napredak started as a member of Titogradski podsavez, a lowest football rank in Montenegro. After the transformation of competition system in SFR Yugoslavia, club mostly played in Central region league (Fourth level).

Biggest success, Napredak made on season 1987-88. They finished third in fourth rank and participated in the playoffs for promotion to Montenegrin Republic League. But, they lost against Dečić.

== Season by season ==
Season	League / Rank	Place	PTS
1973/74.	Titogradski podsavez (IV)	3	21
1974/75.	Titogradski podsavez (IV)	8	20
1975/76.	Titogradski podsavez (IV)	7	23
1976/77.	Titogradski podsavez (IV)	12	16
1977/78.	Titogradski podsavez (IV)	10	13
1978/79.	Titogradski podsavez (IV)	7	20
1979/80.	Srednja regija (IV)	10	14
1980/81.	Srednja regija (IV)	11	11
1981/82.	Srednja regija (IV)	10	6
1982/83.	Srednja regija (IV)	10	21
1983/84.	Srednja regija (IV)	8	21
1984/85.	Srednja regija (IV)	8	13
1985/86.	Srednja regija (IV)	8	8
1986/87.	Srednja regija (IV)	8	11
1987/88.	Srednja regija (IV)	3	23
1988/89.	Srednja regija (V)	8	2
1989/90.	Srednja regija (V)	4	15
1990/91.	Srednja regija (V)	5	14
1991/92.	Srednja regija (V)	4	10
1993/94.	Srednja regija (IV)	5	7

== See also ==
- Donji Kokoti
