= Sahat-kula =

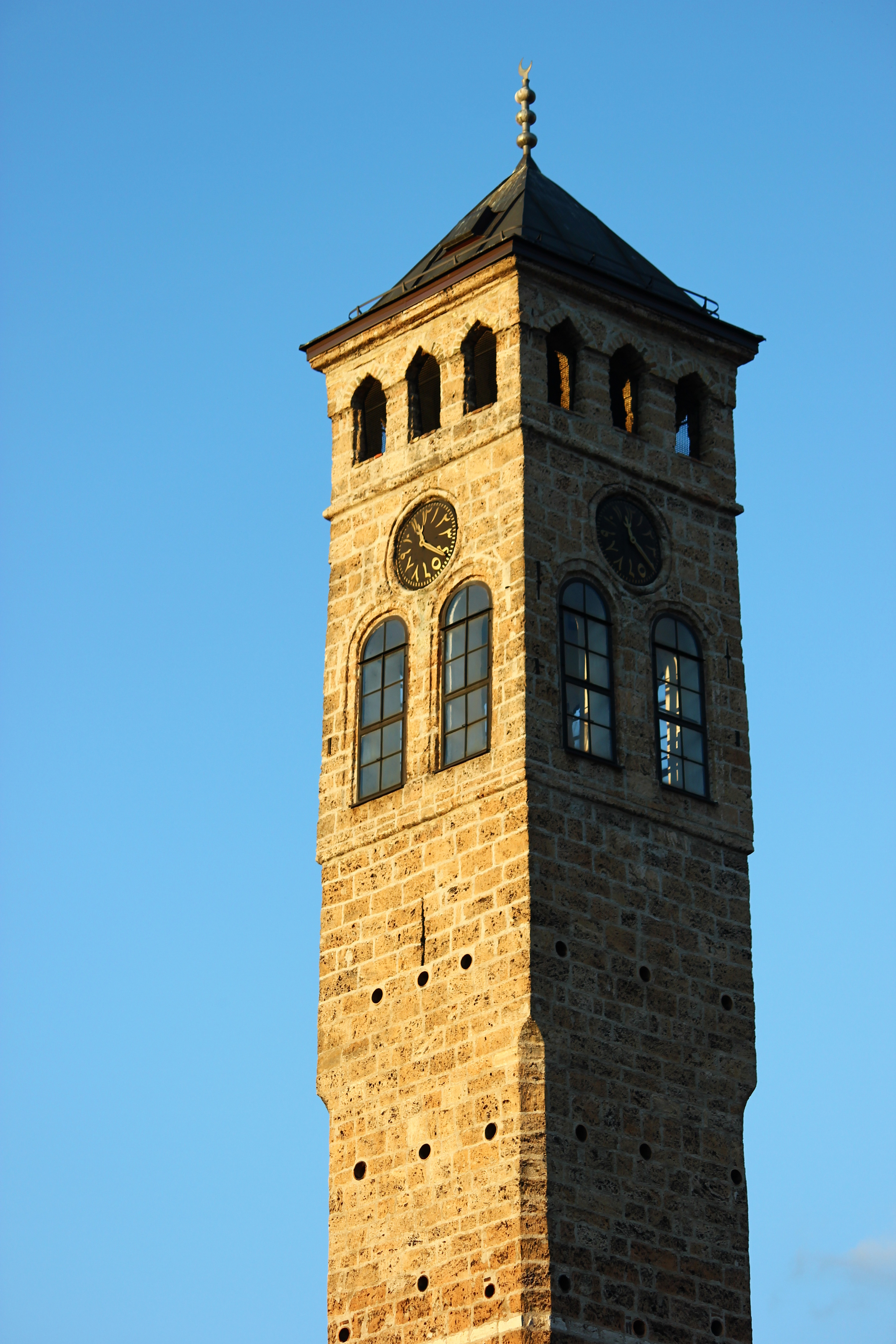
Sarajevo sahat-kula

Sahat-kula (Bosnian: sahat-kula, Serbian Cyrillic: сахат-кула or сат-кула (Macedonian: Саат кула) literally, "clock tower") is a type of clock tower characteristically found in Bosnian market towns (čaršije), as well as of other settlements that were under the rule or influence of the Ottoman Empire. They were built exclusively in the European part of the Ottoman Empire, particularly in Bosnia and Herzegovina, as an Islamic variation of the Western European bell tower, and have become a symbolic architectural feature of Bosnia and Herzegovina. They were usually constructed with a large clock on one or more faces of the tower (most often on all four sides) so that time could be read by as many inhabitants of the settlement as possible. The term sahat-kula is an archaic expression in the Bosnian language and refers to specific structures built predominantly in the territory of Bosnia and Herzegovina.

According to a 16th-century French travel writer, the first sahat kula was erected in Skopje between 1566 and 1572. Sahat kule were most commonly built in the central zones of the čaršija, usually next to mosques, as endowments of individual vakifs (waqf founders). However, they are also found in other locations, such as the sahat kula in Maglaj, which was erected within the lower courtyard of the Maglaj fortress, and those in Tešanj, Gradačac and Počitelj.

== Etymology ==
The term sahat-kula derives from Ottoman Turkish and ultimately from Arabic. The word sahat (also written sāʿat / ساعة) comes from the Arabic noun meaning “hour, time, clock”, which entered Ottoman Turkish as saat with the same meaning. The second component, kula, is a Balkan and Ottoman term for “tower”, used widely in South Slavic languages and in Turkish for fortified or standalone towers.

In Bosnian, the compound sahat-kula literally translates to “clock tower”, and was historically used specifically for towers bearing public timekeeping mechanisms, especially in towns under Ottoman rule. The form is considered archaic in modern usage, surviving primarily in historical, architectural and toponymic contexts.

== Characteristics ==
All sahat kule were built in essentially the same manner, differing only in their dimensions and in the specific locations where they were erected. They are tall structures with a square ground plan, with base dimensions ranging from 3.07 to 4 metres. Their height varies from 10 to 28 metres; the lowest example is in Gornji Vakuf, and the highest in Sarajevo. The wall thickness ranges from 65 centimetres to 1 metre.

The sahat kula in Jajce differs from all other examples in Bosnia and Herzegovina. Strictly speaking, it is not a structure of this type, but an ordinary gate tower (kapi-kula) of the Jajce fortress, into which a timekeeping mechanism was installed sometime after its construction.

They were usually built of stone and finished with a steep, pyramidal roof. Just below the roof there is typically a cornice, and beneath it four openings, one on each side of the tower, in which the clock and its striking mechanism are housed. The clock mechanism is connected to a bell.

Besides these four main openings, sahat kule often have narrow slit-like openings resembling loopholes, running from the base towards the top of the structure. Their purpose is to let limited daylight into the interior and provide enough light for the steep wooden staircase that leads to the clock mechanism. The staircases run along the inside walls of the tower and have small landings at the corners.

== History ==
The construction of sahat kule in the Ottoman Empire began in the mid-16th century, influenced by Central European town belfries and the spread of public mechanical clocks. In the Balkans one of the earliest known clock towers was erected in Skopje between 1566 and 1572, reportedly using a clock taken from the conquered fortress of Szigetvár.

In the territory of present-day Bosnia and Herzegovina, the development of sahat kule followed the urban growth of major market towns in the 16th and 17th centuries, when clock towers were endowed as pious foundations (vakuf) next to main mosques so that daily prayers could be performed at precisely defined times.

In the early modern period many sahat kule on the Balkans did not show “European” mean time, but the so-called "a la turca" time system in which the clock was set so that sunset corresponded to 12 o’clock. Because the length of the day changes over the year, the clock mechanism had to be frequently adjusted by a designated timekeeper (muvekit).

Numerous sahat kule were damaged or demolished during the 19th and 20th centuries, especially in the course of urban redevelopment and in the wars of the 1990s; examples include the Banja Luka clock tower, believed to be the oldest in Bosnia and Herzegovina, which stood near the Ferhadija Mosque and was demolished in 1993.

== Sahat-kule in Bosnia and Herzegovina ==
The sahat kule in Bosnia and Herzegovina were mostly built during the period of Ottoman rule and were constructed to meet the needs of performing the five daily prayers, for which public clocks were installed on the towers. They were generally erected near mosques and often formed part of a larger urban complex which, in addition to the mosque, frequently included mausoleums, bathhouses (hamams), fountains (šadrvans) and craft workshops.

The sahat kula represented an important architectural structure in the classical Ottoman urban organisation in the territory of Bosnia and Herzegovina, marking the centre of an economically developed urban environment. During the period of Ottoman administration in Bosnia and Herzegovina, 21 sahat kule were built:

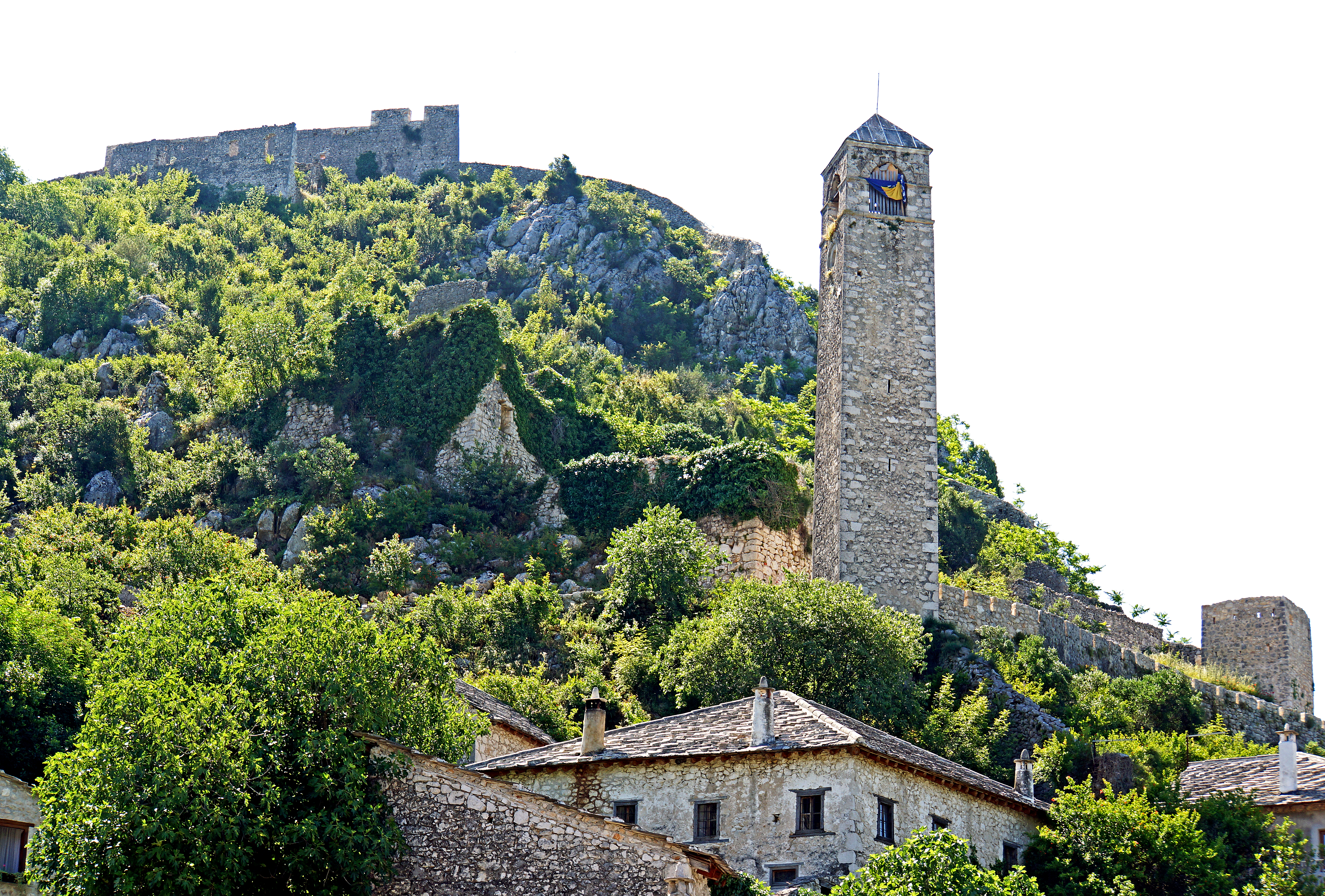
Sahat-kula of Počitelj

- Sahat-kula of Banja Luka – (the first sahat kula in Bosnia and Herzegovina; demolished in 1993)
- Sahat-kula of Donji Vakuf
- Sahat-kula of Foča sahat kula
- Sahat-kula of Gračanica
- Sahat-kula of Gradačac
- Sahat-kula of Gornji Vakuf
- Sahat-kula of Jajce
- Sahat-kula of Livno
- Sahat-kula of Maglaj
- Sahat-kula of Mostar
- Sahat-kula of Nevesinje
- Sahat-kula of Počitelj
- Sahat-kula of Prozor
- Sahat-kula of Prusac
- Sahat kula of Sarajevo
- Sahat-kula of Stolac
- Sahat-kula of Tešanj
- Sahat-kula of Travnik in Musala
- Sahat-kula of Travnik in Gornja Čaršija
- Sahat-kula of Trebinje
- Sahat-kula of Vratnik (Sarajevo) (built of wood in 1874 and demolished due to structural instability and risk of collapse)

== Sahat-kule in Serbia ==
- Sahat-kula of Belgrade
- Sahat-kula of Prijepolje
- Sahat-kula of Pirot

== Sahat-kule in Montenegro ==
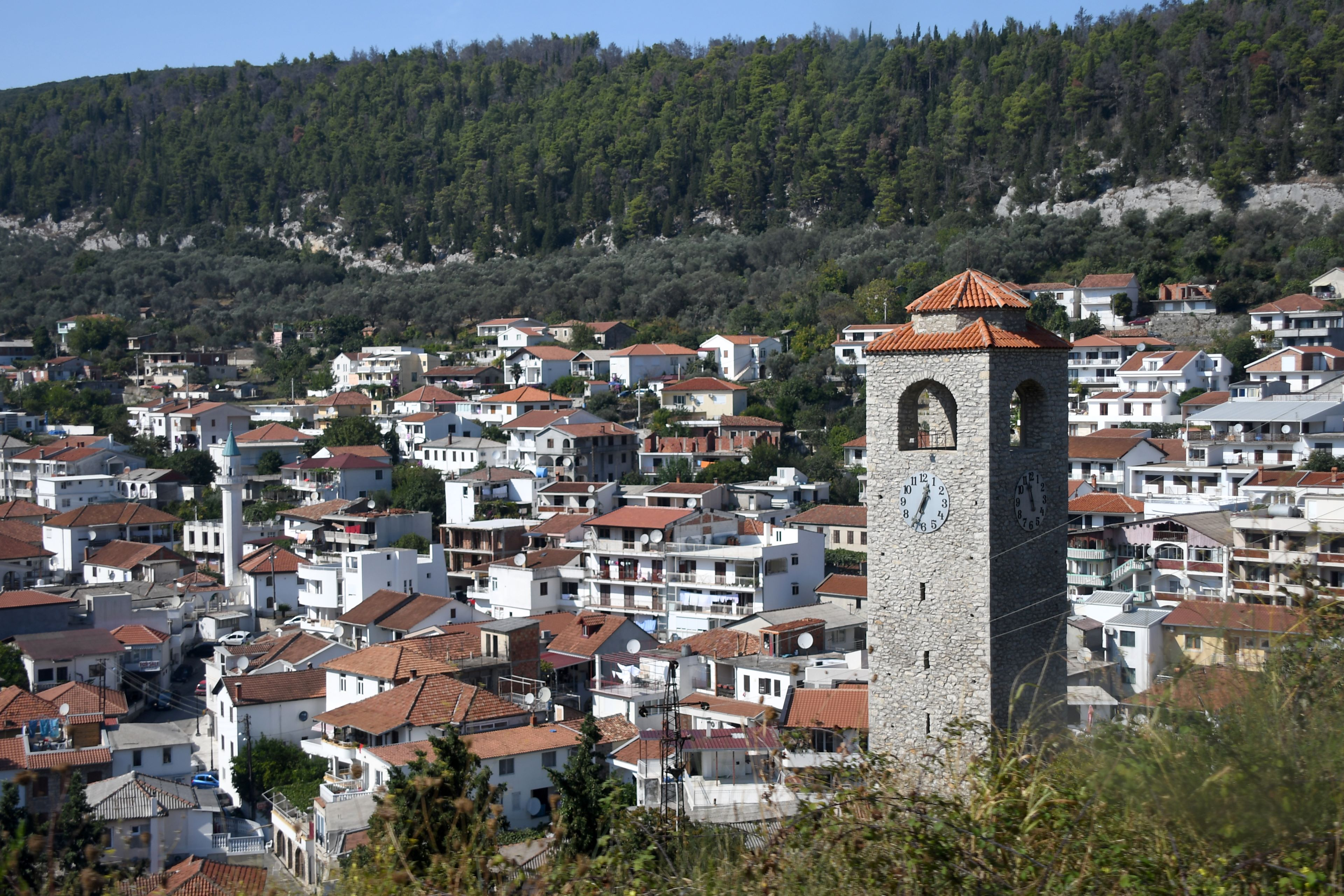
Sahat-kula of Ulcinj

- Sahat-kula of Podgorica
- Sahat-kula of Pljevlja
- Sahat-kula of Ulcinj

== Sahat-kule in North Macedonia ==
- Sahat-kula of Bitola
- Sahat-kula of Kumanovo
- Sahat-kula of Kratovo

== See also ==
- Clock tower
- Ottoman architecture
