= Stara Varoš, Podgorica =

Ottoman-Era Neighborhood in Podgorica, Montenegro

Coordinates: 42.4356°N 19.2601°E

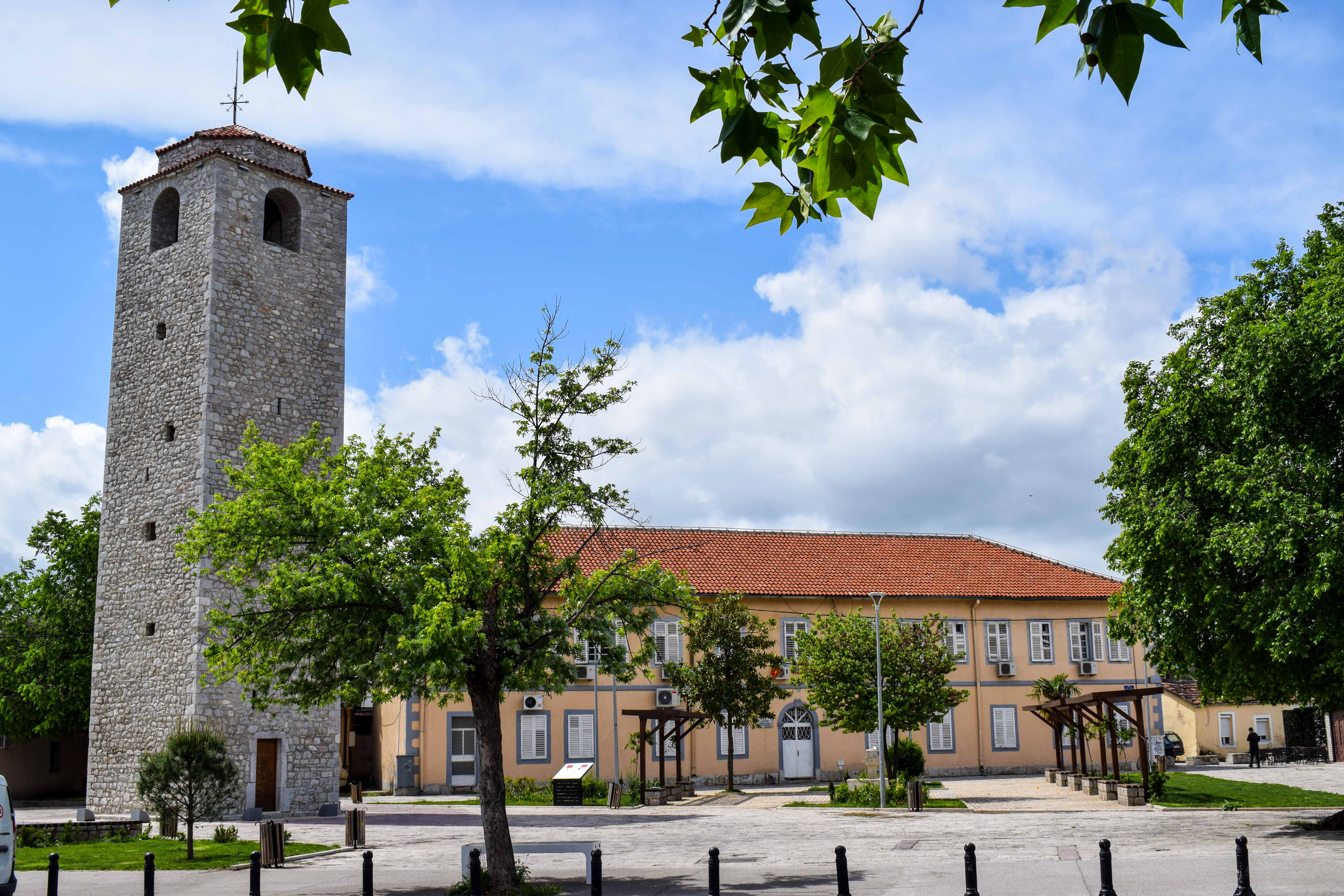
Natural History Museum and the Clock Tower

Stara Varoš (Montenegrin Cyrillic: Стара Варош) is an Ottoman-era neighbourhood in Podgorica, Montenegro. It was the core of the city between the 15th and 19th century. Much of the neighbourhood was damaged or destroyed during the bombing of Podgorica in World War II, though some buildings and monuments remain.

== Notable sights ==
- Sahat kula (Clock Tower of Hadži-paša Osmanagić)
- The Natural History Museum of Montenegro
- Depedogen (Ribnica fortress)
- Osmanagića and Starodoganjska mosques
- The Old Bridge over the Ribnica (Adži-paša's bridge)

== See also ==
- List of Podgorica neighbourhoods and suburbs#Drač and Stara Varoš
