= Vrela Ribnička =

Neighborhood in Podgorica, Montenegro

Coordinates: 42°25′39″N 19°17′48″E

- Neighborhood
- Interactive map of Vrela Ribnička

Population
  - Total: 7,854

Vrela Ribnička (Montenegrin: Врела Рибничка) is a neighborhood in Podgorica, Montenegro that borders the neighborhoods of Kakaricka Gora, Masline, Ribnica and Stari Aerodrom. Vrela Ribnička is a subdivision of the larger Konik neighborhood.

It is mostly a lowrise residential area, with very poor infrastructure. Most of the neighborhood has an appearance of a slum town. On its southeastern tip, it has a real refugee camp that is more like a shanty town than a camp. It has a garbage dump and many garbage processing facilities.

Since the domestic population consists heavily of Roma, Vrela Ribnička is considered the largest ghetto in Podgorica.

== Geography ==
Vrela Ribnička is bordered to the north and east by the Ribnica. To the south, it is bordered by the village of Omerbožovići, and to the west by Ćemovsko Polje (Ćemo's Field).

Major streets in Vrela Ribnička include Yugoslav volunteers in the Spanish Civil War Street (Ulica Španskih boraca) and Hegumen Street (Ulica Igumanska).

== History ==
=== Refugee camp ===
The Vrela Ribnička refugee camp is one of the five refugee settlements in Montenegro. Built in 1994, the camp houses many refugees of Bosnian origin displaced during the Yugoslav Wars. Financial support came from the United Nations High Commissioner for Refugees (UNHCR). The settlement consists of eight one-story residential buildings, containing 200 housing units altogether. A housing unit consists of one room occupied by one family and a common bathroom and toilet shared with adjoining neighbours. Intended for temporary accommodation, the quality of construction was initially low. As of March 1999, 196 refugee families live in the settlement, with a total of about 850 household members, most of whom were either born in Montenegro or had family in either Podgorica and/or Montenegro.

==== Roma ====
Adjoining the settlement is a "tent camp" known as "Konik I," established in 1998 for displaced Kosovar Roma. In October 1998, the Podgorica Red Cross registered nearly 2,000 Roma in the tent camp. Construction on these facilities were so poorly completed that barely anything functioned properly, with repairs nearly impossible. Many of these Kosovar Roma had lived in similar conditions as they did in Kosovo.

On 5 December 1999, the tent camp was badly damaged as a result of a storm, resulting in the loss of 170 tents, and homelessness of about 600 people. By April 2000, a new refugee camp, known as Konik II, was built with better infrastructure. By then, only 56 barracks had been built to accommodate 56 families, but only 14 were occupied.

=== 2000s construction boom ===
Vrela Ribnička, however, is now a site of Podgorica's many construction booms. One of the largest projects in Vrela Ribnička in 2007 was the reconstruction of the Yugoslav volunteers in the Spanish Civil War Street (Ulica Španskih boraca), which saw a new sidewalk put in place in both directions and new asphalt put in place. The project occurred between June and September 2007. This project, however, was scheduled to have been completed by 20 August 2007, but by that date, only three-quarters of the project had been completed. In addition to a street expansion, the bridge at its northern end crossing the Ribnica was rebuilt, and modernized. Negative impacts on the local population occurred as a result of the street expansion, however. It caused a drop in profits on businesses located on the street, as well as an increase in traffic on the much smaller Hegumen Street (Ulica Igumanska).

== Education ==
Božidar Vuković Podgoričanin Elementary School (Osnovna škola "Božidar Vuković Podgoričanin“) is a primary school located in Vrela Ribnička. In 2006, the school was expanded to accommodate enrollment of children additional children between the ages of 5 and 7.

== Demographics ==
According to the 1991 census, Vrela Ribnička had 7,854 residents.

Ethnicity	Number	Percentage
Montenegrins	2,565	32.66%
ethnic Muslims	2,561	32.61%
Roma	1,334	16.98%
Serbs	438	5.58%
Albanians	363	4.62%
Yugoslavs	332	4.23%
Others	261	3.32%
Total	7,854	100%
