= Sahat kula =

Sahat kula or Saat kula (meaning "clock tower") can refer to:

- Sahat-kula
- Clock Tower of Podgorica
- Clock Tower of Bitola
- Clock Tower of Ulcinj
