= Pobrežje =

Pobrežje may refer to:

- Pobrežje District, a suburb of Maribor, Slovenia
- Pobrežje, Črnomelj, a village near Črnomelj, Slovenia
- Pobrežje, Videm, a village near Ptuj, Slovenia
- Pobrežje, Podgorica, a suburb of Podgorica, Montenegro
- Pobrežje, Croatia, a village near Dubrovnik, Croatia
