= Church of the Holy Heart of Jesus, Podgorica =

Roman Catholic church in Montenegro

Church of the Holy Heart of Jesus Crkva Presvetog Srca Isusovog Црква Пресветог Срца Исусовог Kisha Zëmra e Shëjt e Krishtit
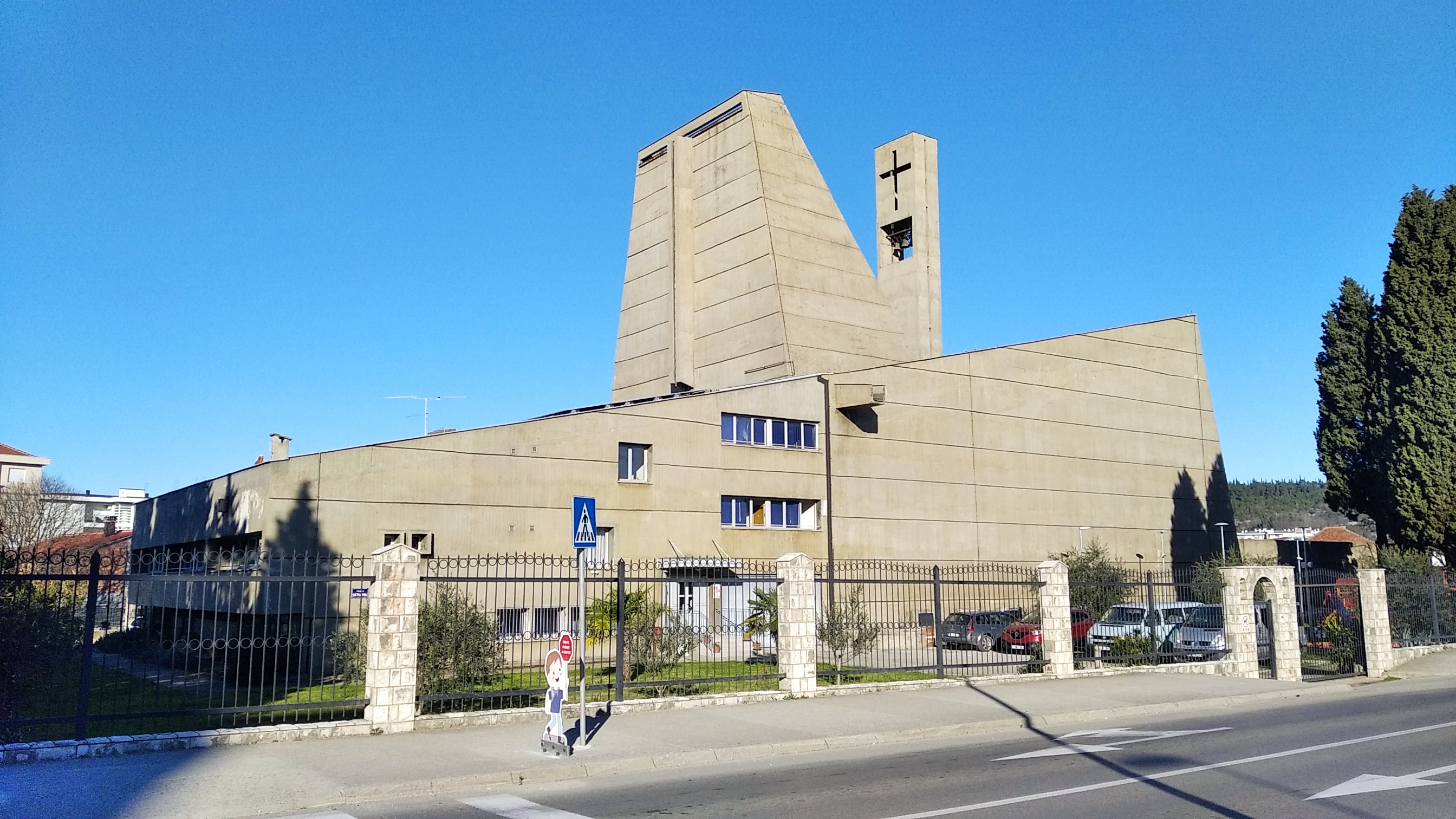
- Church of the Holy Heart of Jesus

Religion
- Affiliation: Roman Catholic Church
- Year consecrated: 1969

Location
- Location: Podgorica, Montenegro
- Interactive map of Church of the Holy Heart of Jesus; Crkva Presvetog Srca Isusovog; Црква Пресветог Срца Исусовог; Kisha Zëmra e Shëjt e Krishtit
- Coordinates: 42.437813°N 19.275618°E

Architecture
- Architect: Zvonimir Vrkljan
- Style: Brutalism
- Completed: 1969
- Dome: 40m

Website
- www.donbosko.me

The Church of the Holy Heart of Jesus (Albanian: Kisha Zëmra e Shëjt e Krishtit, Montenegrin: Crkva Presvetog Srca Isusovog, Montenegrin Cyrillic: Црква Пресветог Срца Исусовог) is the only Roman Catholic church in the city of Podgorica, Montenegro. It was built in 1969, replacing the city centre church which was destroyed during the bombing of Podgorica in World War II. The church is a unique example of brutalist architecture, and is located in the Konik neighborhood. It serves the native Albanian Catholic population in Podgorica and Tuzi.

== Construction ==
The cathedral was built in 1969, three years after the renewal of the city's Catholic parish. It was designed by Zvonimir Vrkljan, an engineer and professor of the Faculty of Architecture, University of Zagreb, Croatia, and was built to resemble a ship. It was consecrated on June 29, 1969, by Aleksandar Tokić, the then-Archbishop of the Roman Catholic Archdiocese of Bar. The church has a 40-metre-high (130 ft) freestanding bell tower, with concrete spiral staircases. From the dark interior, a 25-metre-high (82 ft) tower sticks up, filtering light to illuminate the main altar. Its facade was never finished.

== See also ==
- Roman Catholicism in Montenegro
- Roman Catholic Archdiocese of Bar
