= Ribnica (fortress) =

15th-century Ottoman fortress in Montenegro

Ribnica Рибница
- Podgorica, Montenegro
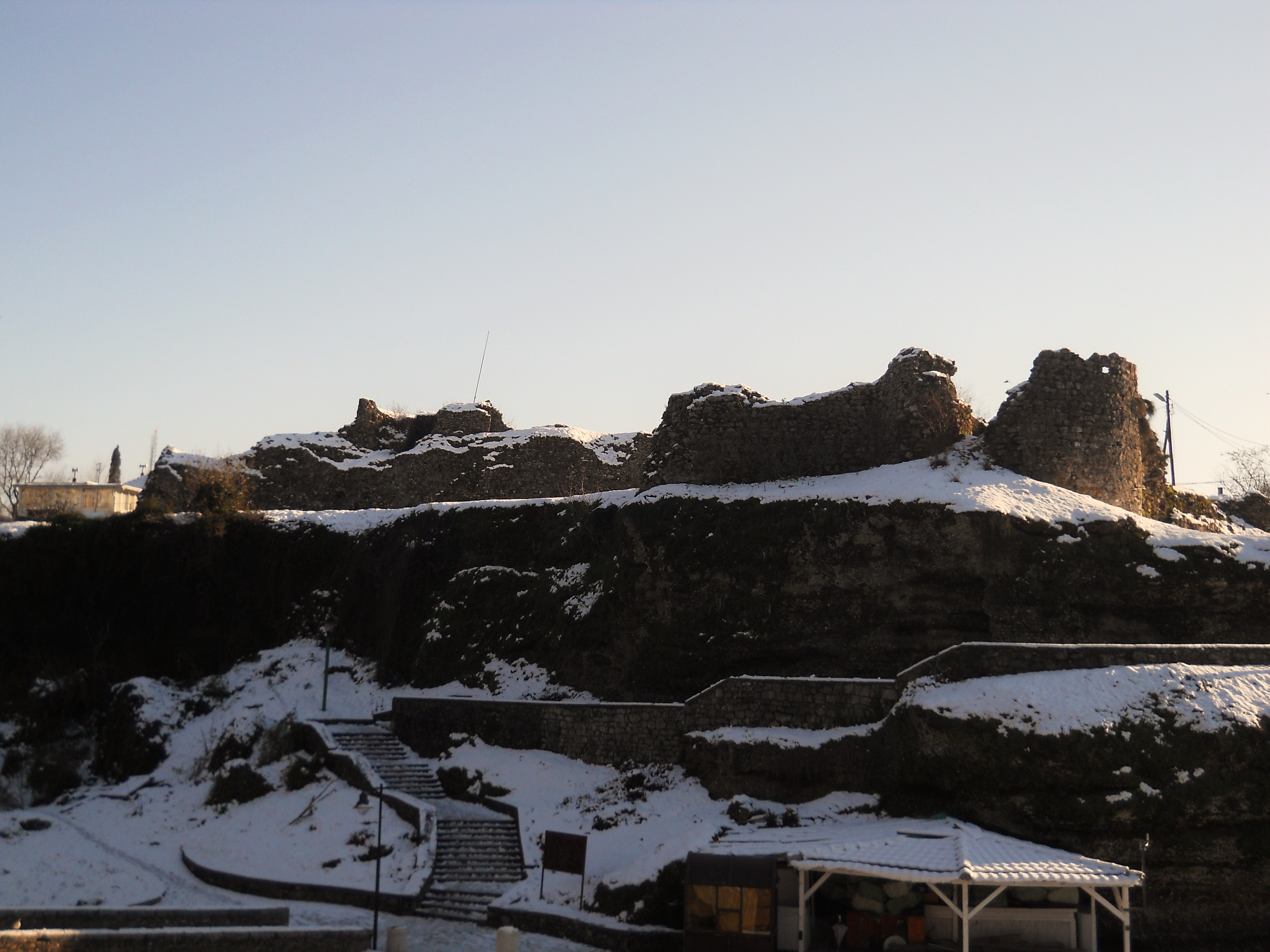
- Ribnica Fortress rarely seen covered with snow

Site information
- Type: Fortress
- Open to the public: Yes

Location
- Location within Montenegro
- Coordinates: 42.438999°N 19.259127°E

Site history
- Built: 15th century
- Materials: Limestone

The Ribnica Fortress (Montenegrin: тврђава Рибница, romanized: tvrđava Ribnica) is a historic Ottoman fortress located in the Stara Varoš neighborhood of Podgorica, the capital city of Montenegro.

== History ==
The fortress was built in the late 15th century (around 1477), during Ottoman rule. It sits above the confluence of the Ribnica and Morača rivers, and was one of two fortresses that surrounded Stara Varoš.

For a long time, Depedöğen (Turkish; Montenegrin: Депедоген, romanized: Depedogen) served as an ammunition warehouse. It was severely damaged in 1878, when a lightning strike triggered an explosion that destroyed a large part of the fortress's interior and exterior.

It is believed that the fortress stems from the 12th century and that it is the birthplace of Stefan Nemanja, the founding father of the Nemanjić dynasty. Therefore, the Serbs of Montenegro call the fortress Nemanjin Grad or Nemanjića Grad ("Nemanja's Town" in Serbian), and Orthodox ceremonies are often held at the location. The name Nemanjin Grad for this site is believed to have originated with King Nikola of Montenegro, who popularized this name upon freeing Podgorica from the Ottoman Empire in 1878.
