= Ljubović =

Coordinates: 42°25′52.9″N 19°15′14.3″E

- Interactive map of Ljubović
- Time zone: UTC+1

Ljubović (Montenegrin: Љубовић) is a suburb of Podgorica, Montenegro.
