= Zagorič =

Suburb of Podgorica, Montenegro

Zagorič Загорич
- Suburb
- Interactive map of Zagorič
- Coordinates: 42.46130°N 19.27646°E
- Country: Montenegro
- City: Podgorica
- Time zone: UTC+1

Zagorič (Montenegrin: Загорич) is a suburb of Podgorica, Montenegro, and its name is derived from the expression Iza Gorice ("Behind Gorica"). It is entirely lowrise residential area.

== See also ==
- List of Podgorica neighbourhoods and suburbs#Zagorič
