= Gornja Gorica, Podgorica =

Suburb of Podgorica, Montenegro

Gornja Gorica
- Interactive map of Gornja Gorica
- Coordinates: 42°26′13″N 19°13′15″E

Area
  - Total: 5.30 km^{2} (2.05 sq mi)
- Time zone: UTC+1
- Vehicle registration: PG

Gornja Gorica (Montenegrin: Горња Горица) is a suburb of Podgorica, Montenegro It is located in the western part of Podgorica, capital of Montenegro. The exact population is unknown, but it is estimated to have around 5,000 people living in the area. It was under constant pressure by Austro-Hungary during World War 1 so it's also a historical place. Gornja Gorica is currently the biggest suburb in Podgorica by area in km^{2}.
