= Ibričevina, Podgorica =

Suburb of Podgorica, Montenegro

Ibričevina Ибричевина
- Suburb
- Interactive map of Ibričevina
- Coordinates: 42.44157°N 19.27913°E
- Time zone: UTC+1

Ibričevina (Montenegrin: Ибричевина) is a suburb of Podgorica, Montenegro.
