= Vranići, Podgorica =

Suburb of Podgorica, Montenegro

Vranići Вранићи
- Suburb
- Location within Montenegro
- Coordinates: 42.46226°N 19.23523°E
- Time zone: UTC+1

Vranići (Montenegrin: Вранићи) is a suburb of Podgorica, Montenegro.
