= Konik, Montenegro =

Konik
- Interactive map of Konik
- Coordinates: 42.438°N 19.282°E

Area
  - Total: 10.000 km^{2} (3.861 sq mi)

Population (2024)
  - Total: 50.000
  - Density: 10/km^{2} (26/sq mi)
- Time zone: UTC+1

Konik (Montenegrin: Коник) is a suburb of Podgorica, Montenegro, and is its largest suburb.

== History ==
The Konik suburb was founded at the middle of the 20th century, at the coast of Ribnica river, and was known as Ribnica. Konik is situated on Ćemovsko Polje, the only deserted field in Montenegro. The first inhabitants of Konik were people from Podgorica and places near the town, which searched greater land than those in Podgorica. During the 1950s only 300 people in the town. At the start of the 1960s, there were many migrations from other parts of Montenegro to Konik. So, in 1969, lived a large percent of Montenegrins, Albanians, Bosniaks, Roma and a few other minorities. Most of them came from Tuzi, Kuči, and also from the other parts of Podgorica and other municipalities of middle Montenegro. During the 1970s and 1980s, Konik was recognized like the center of Southeast Podgorica. At that era, in the suburb was built Health center, Cinema and Culture center, two schools, Roman Catholic Cathedral. In 1974, Sport club Ribnica was founded, with football, futsal, boxing, judo, chess and table tennis clubs. Futsal club Ribnica (earlier KMF 'Kostolomci') is double Podgorica's champion, and the judo club Ribnica won one champions title in SFR Yugoslavia. Today, the suburb has about 34,000 inhabitants, and with the neighboring suburbs like Stari Aerodrom and Drač, they made up half of Podgorica population. 19 ethnicities live in Konic - Montenegrins, Serbs, Albanians, Bosniaks, Muslims, Roma, Hungarians, Slovenians, Russians, Germans, Romanians, Moldovans, Swedish, Egyptians, ethnic Macedonians, Arabs, Turks, Bulgarians, Ukrainians and Belarusians.

== Geography ==
Located in the Ćemovsko polje, Konik is situated at the elevation of 29 meters. Territory of Konik is not clearly bordered, but, suburb is situated at the field between railway at the northwest, Ribnica river from the southeast, Cijevna river from the east, road Podgorica - Tuzi from the southeast and Boulevard between Konik and Stari Aerodrom from the south. River Ribnica, which flows is started in Konik is long about 8 kilometers. Suburb is founded at the left coast of that river. Ćemovsko polje is situated in the area which is situated at the 300 kilometers of field. On that field is built Ćemovsko Polje Airport and the greatest vineyard in the all Balkan and Europe too. All territory of Konik is lying at the underground waters, so at the Ćemovsko polje, there are many water-stations.

== Climate ==
According to the Köppen climate classification Konik has a Mediterranean climate. On average of the maximum temperatures is of 25 Celsius. At the July temperatures in Konik are greater than 45 Celsius, and in December temperatures are not less than 10 Celsius.

== Demographics ==
As of the census of 2005, the population was about 34,000. The population density was 1,478.26/km^{2}.

Ethnicity	Percentage
Montenegrins	42.3%
Serbs	24%
Albanians	11.7%
Bosniaks	7.6%
Roma	7%
Muslims	4%
Egyptians	1.6%
Other	1.8%

== Parts of Konik ==
Today, there are two parts of Konik - Ribnica and Vrela Ribnička.

Ribnica: Origin part is Ribnica and that place is situated at the entrance of suburb. Ribnica is situated at the field from the Roman Catholic Cathedrale to the Stadium. In this part of Konik lives about 12,000 people. The majority of Ribnica are Montenegrins, Albanians and Serbs.

Vrela Ribnička: Second part of Konik is Vrela Ribnička place. That part is situated between Stadium and neighborhood place Omerbožovići. In Vrela Ribnička lives about 22,000 inhabitants. In that place is situated much of Romas' and refugees' camps, and in that camps lives about 10,000 people. The majority of Vrela Ribnička are Montenegrins, Roma and Bosniaks.

== Traffic ==
In the front of Konik is situated international road Podgorica - Shkodër. In 2008 on the streets near the Roman Catholic Cathedral will be built a main magistral way which goes to the seacoast. In Konik on the Ćemovsko Polje is situated an amateur's airport. Podgorica's railway station is near Konik, and the main bus station too. Other main roads which go through Konik are: Podgorica - Dinoša - Tuzi, Podgorica - Tuzi - Shkodër and a part of Mateševo - Podgorica - Sozina autoroad, which building is planned for 2008.

== Education and monuments ==
Today, at Konik exists two elementary schools with more than 2,000 pupils. First, which is situated at the Ribnica part is named 'Marko Miljanov', and the second, situated at the Vrela Ribnicka called 'Božidar Vuković - Podgoričanin'. At the 2007, school 'Marko Miljanov' have great results at the republic competitions. Pupils from that school won at the Montenegrin schools' football, women's handball competitions and anti-drugs quizzes. Students from another school won at the national volleyball and biological competitions. The greatest monument of Konik is Roman Catholic Cathedral at the 'Gate of Konik' (entrance). Cathedral is built at 1967 and the tower of that Cathedral, with 47 meters, is the highest object in Podgorica. Except two halls for the masses and great rooms in the main part, there is a Cathedral sport hall too, which is home of many sport competitions for youth Montenegrins. Roman Catholic Cathedral also made progress with education. Church made a lot of courses for the students from Konik, like computers, languages, health and sports. Other monuments are Partisans' monument in the front of the 'Marko Miljanov' school, Monument to the shouted fascism victims at the end of Vrela Ribnička and few smallest monuments.

== Culture ==
In the 1970s, at the Konik was built first Culture center. At that object, where is situated local administration and police too, until the 1990s existed cinema. After that, the big hall of Culture center, with capacity of 700 seats, was used to political conventions and theater shows. Roman Catholic Church today is organizing few theater shows and concerts yearly.

== See also ==
- FK Ribnica
- Stadion na Koniku
