= FK Blue Star Podgorica =

Football club in Montenegro

FK Blue Star
- Full name: Fudbalski klub Blue Star
- Founded: 2002; 24 years ago
- Ground: Stadion Masline; Podgorica, Montenegro
- Capacity: 200
- League: Montenegrin Third League

Fudbalski klub Blue Star is a Montenegrin football club based in Masline, a suburb of Capital Podgorica. Founded in 2002, they currently compete in Montenegrin Third League.

== History ==
FK Blue Star is founded at 2002, as a youth-categories team. Senior team is founded on 2006, and debuted in the inaugural season of Montenegrin Third League, finishing sixth among the eight teams in Central division. Biggest success, the team made on season 2010–11, winning the title of Montenegrin Third League champion after the hard struggle with FK Zora and FK Drezga. But, in the final playoffs for Montenegrin Second League against FK Igalo and FK Petnjica, FK Blue Star finished as a last placed team.

The team won one title in Central Region Cup (2011), with playing in the finals at 2008. It gained them two participations in Montenegrin Cup. First time, on season 2008-09, FK Blue Star hosted one of the strongest Montenegrin teams - FK Sutjeska. After surprisingly 0–0 result in regular time, Blue Star were eliminated after penalties (2–4). Next time, they played in 2011–12 Montenegrin Cup, with elimination in Round one against FK Čelik (0–2).

== Honours and achievements ==
- Montenegrin Third League – 1
  - winners (1): 2010–11
- Central Region Cup – 1
  - winners (1): 2011

== Stadium ==
Since 2002, FK Blue Star is using Stadion Masline as their home ground. Stadium is a part of Military of Montenegro complex in Podgorica suburb Masline.

== See also ==
- Stadion Masline
- Montenegrin Third League
- Football in Montenegro
