= Stadion Masline =

Football stadium in Podgorica, Montenegro

- Interactive map of Stadion Masline
- Location: Masline, Podgorica, Montenegro
- Coordinates: 42.444221°N 19.290782°E
- Owner: Military of Montenegro
- Operator: Military of Montenegro
- Capacity: 200
- Surface: grass

Tenant
- FK Blue Star

Stadion Masline is a football venue in Masline, a suburb of Podgorica, Montenegro. As a part of big complex of Military of Montenegro, it is used for football matches and is currently the home ground of FK Blue Star.

== History ==
Yugoslav People's Army built the Masline complex during the 1960s. Among the facilities, used only by soldiers, was a football ground with an athletic field. Until the start of the 1990s, the complex was named after Josip Broz Tito and today is the ownership of the Military of Montenegro.
Since 2002, the stadium is used by local team FK Blue Star. The stadium has a capacity of 200 seats.

== See also ==
- Military of Montenegro
- FK Blue Star
- Podgorica
