= Donji Kokoti =

Donji Kokoti Доњи Кокоти
- Suburb
- Location within Montenegro
- Coordinates: 42°24′02″N 19°11′30″E
- Country: Montenegro
- Municipality: Podgorica
- Elevation: 22 m (72 ft)

Population (2023)
  - Total: 1,690
- Time zone: UTC+1 (CET)
  - Summer (DST): UTC+2 (CEST)
- Postal code: 81000

Donji Kokoti (Montenegrin Cyrillic: Доњи Кокоти) is a suburb located five kilometers of Podgorica, Montenegro. According to the 2011 census, it had a population of 1,073, the majority of which identified as Montenegrins. It is on the banks of rivers Morača and Sitnica.

== History and geography ==
Donji Kokoti are a part of historical region Lješkopolje, situated in southwest Podgorica. Donji Kokoti are built on a plain between two rivers, with neighbouring settlements Donja Gorica on the east and north, Farmaci on the west, Botun on the south.

=== Early period ===
For the first time, Donji Kokoti are mentioned in historical sources from the 14th century, during the rule of Crnojević noble family. From that time, during the next three centuries, one of main roads in Montenegro, from Spuž to Žabljak Crnojevića passed through settlement.

During the existence of Old Montenegro, until the 1878, Donji Kokoti were on the border between Montenegro and the Ottoman Empire. Border line was river Sitnica, so Donji Kokoti, as a place on its left bank, were a part of Ottoman territory. Despite that, people of Donji Kokoti participated as a part of Montenegrin army during the battles against the Turks, including a nearby Battle of Lješkopolje (1604).

Finally, on the Congress of Berlin (1878), Donji Kokoti became a part of Montenegro, together with today's Capital Podgorica.

=== Middle period ===
In period 1878 – 1946, Donji Kokoti were dominantly agricultural settlement, whose population variated from 375 in 1925 to 303 after the World War II. During the all that time, settlement had no more than 100 households, and was divided on two parts – Upper End (Gornji Kraj) and Lower End (Donji Kraj). At the time of World War II, 19 residents, including two children, died in conflicts or the violent acts of the occupiers. As in the all Lješkopolje and Podgorica region, big majority of Donji Kokoti residents were a members of Partisan movement during the war.

=== New period ===
After the World War II, instead Cetinje, the new capital of Montenegro became Podgorica. That affected Donji Kokoti, which saw a population growth during the decades. Except that, more population became a part of Yugoslav industrial revolution, so the agriculture was no more dominant branch of development in the settlement.

After the breakup of SFR Yugoslavia, Donji Kokoti became a part of Podgorica's local subdivision Lješkopolje. Montenegrin independence (2006) was followed by developing of transportation and building new economic and educational zones on the plain between Donji Kokoti and Donja Gorica. So, near the border of settlement, today are situated facilities as University of Donja Gorica, elementary school, "Verde" hotel and sports complex with swimming pool and indoor arena, malls, hyper markets, furniture salons, car salons and many other business centers.

On the last census (2011), for the first time in history, number of inhabitants is over 1,000. Today, Donji Kokoti are a suburban settlement from the left side of M-2.3 road, one of the most important traffic links in Montenegro. During the 2018, started a construction of new bridge on Morača river, from Donji Kokoti to Podgorica Airport and main road to Montenegrin riviera.

== Economy ==
As it is situated near the major M-2.3 road, Donji Kokoti are the seat of many construction companies, import companies, furniture and car-factory salons. In new period, near the borders of the settlement was built new hotel, indoor sport arena "Verde", swimming pool, university and elementary school. Still, one of main activity of local residents is agriculture, especially producing of watermelons, grapes, other fruit and tomatoes. Fishing on Sitnica and Morača rivers is also one of the main activities of local residents, especially during the winter and spring months.

== Education ==
As a part of fast developing micro region, Donji Kokoti are close to few new educational institutions. Near the borders of settlement, at 2007 is built University of Donja Gorica. Before that, at the same place is opened Elementary school "Vlado Milić", for pupils from Lješkopolje region. Children from Donji Kokoti are a part of two state-owned kindergartens – in Donja Gorica and Farmaci.

== Demographics ==
Historical population
Year	Pop.	±%
1925	375	—
1941	352	−6.1%
1948	303	−13.9%
1953	333	+9.9%
1961	405	+21.6%
1971	421	+4.0%
1981	523	+24.2%
1991	581	+11.1%
2003	772	+32.9%
2011	1,080	+39.9%
2023	1,690	+56.5%

Donji Kokoti are among the Podgorica suburban settlements with continuous population growth. According to 2023 census, it had a population of 1,690. The majority of Donji Kokoti citizens are Montenegrins. According to 2011 census, there was a 52 percent of Montenegrin population and 38 percent of Serbs. By religious views, dominant majority of population are Orthodox Christians (92.40%).

Nationality (2011)	Number	Percentage
Montenegrins	873	51.7%
Serbs	640	37.8%
others	177	10.5%

== Sports ==
=== Facilities ===
There are numerous sports facilities in Donji Kokoti: two football pitches, four tennis courts (TK As) and one basketball hall (House of basketball), which is the sead of SC Derby basketball club. On the field between Donji Kokoti and Donja Gorica, there are few new objects as Indoor sports arena "Verde" (capacity: 2,600 seats), indoor swimming pool and DG Arena (capacity: 4,000 seats).

=== Clubs ===
Currently, in Donji Kokoti is situated the seat of ABA League member SC Derby. During the past, most known sports team from Donji Kokoti was FK Napredak which participated in lower Montenegrin football leagues from 1971 to 1995. Donji Kokoti are Podgorica's center of tennis and home to Tennis club As.

=== WTA tournament ===
Every year, Donji Kokoti are home of most important international tennis tournament in Montenegro – WTA Podgorica, also known as a Royal Cup NLB Montenegro. First edition of $25,000 tournament was held in 2004. Initiated as a tournament of women tennis players from former Yugoslavia, WTA Podgorica soon became a competition with participation of numerous players from Western Europe and Americas.

== See also ==
- Subdivisions of Podgorica
