= Dahna, Podgorica =

Suburb of Podgorica, Montenegro

Dahna Дахна
- Suburb
- Interactive map of Dahna
- Coordinates: 42°25′39″N 19°13′40″E
- Country: Montenegro
- City: Podgorica
- Time zone: UTC+1

Dahna (Montenegrin: Дахна) is a suburb of Podgorica, Montenegro.
