= Masline =

Suburb of Podgorica, Montenegro

- Interactive map of Masline
- Country: Montenegro
- Municipality: Podgorica
- City: Podgorica
- Time zone: UTC+1

Masline (Montenegrin: Маслине) is a suburb of Podgorica, Montenegro.

It contains a stadium known as Stadion Masline.

== See also ==
- List of Podgorica neighbourhoods and suburbs § Zlatica and Masline
- Stadion Masline
