= Pobrežje, Podgorica =

Suburb of Podgorica, Montenegro

Pobrežje
- Interactive map of Pobrežje
- Coordinates: 42°25′52″N 19°15′34″E
- Time zone: UTC+1

Pobrežje (Montenegrin: Побрежје) is a neighborhood of Podgorica, Montenegro.
