= Drač, Podgorica =

Neighbourhood in Podgorica

Drač Драч
- Neighbourhood of Podgorica
- Interactive map of Drač
- Coordinates: 42°26′08″N 19°16′04″E
- Country: Montenegro
- City: Podgorica

Population (2011)
  - Total: 3,500−4,000
- Time zone: UTC+01:00 (CET)
- Postal code: 81 000
- Area code: +382 20
- License plate: PG

Drač (Montenegrin: Драч) is a neighbourhood of Podgorica, Montenegro.

Drač is bounded by Belgrade–Bar railway, Oktobarske Revolucije street, Pete Proleterske Boulevard and Bratstva - Jedinstva street.

== See also ==
- List of Podgorica neighbourhoods and suburbs#Drač and Stara Varoš
