= Adži-paša's bridge =

Bridge in Podgorica, Montenegro

Coordinates: 42.439532°N 19.258816°E

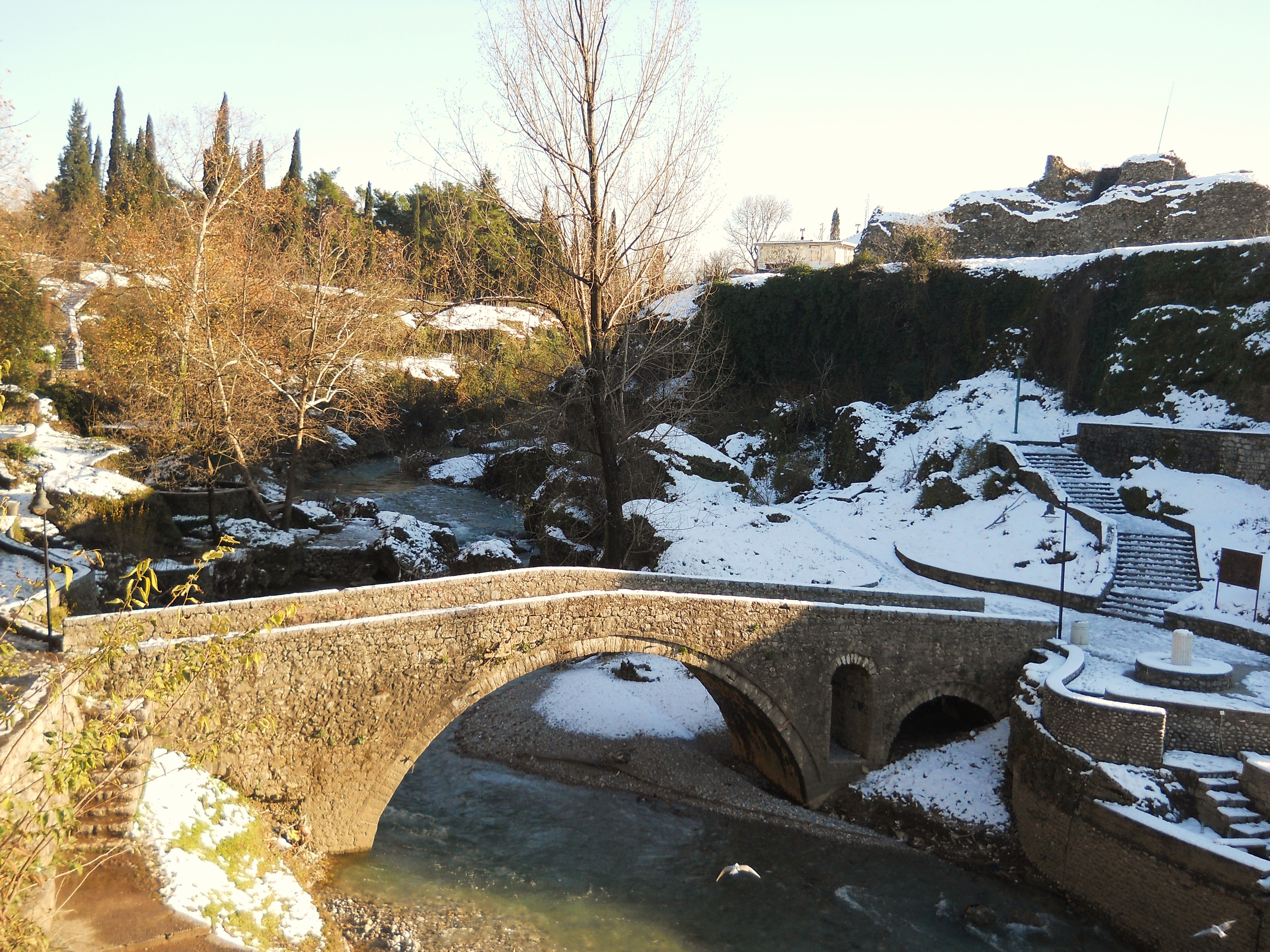
The bridge during winter

The Old Bridge over the Ribnica (Montenegrin: Стари мост на Рибници, Stari most na Ribnici) is the oldest bridge in Podgorica, Montenegro. It spans the Ribnica river, near its confluence with the Morača river. The bridge was built during the period of Roman rule and underwent a major reconstruction in the 18th century. (Аџи-пашин мост, Adži-pašin most).
