= Kumanovo Clock Tower =

Defunct clock tower in Kumanovo, Ottoman Empire

- Саат Кула Куманово
- Interactive map of Kumanovo Clock Tower
- Location: Kumanovo, Ottoman Empire (now North Macedonia)
- Type: Ottoman architecture
- Material: Stone
- Beginning date: 1520
- Completion date: 1530

Kumanovo Clock Tower (Macedonian: Саат Кула Куманово) was a clock tower in Kumanovo, Ottoman Empire (today North Macedonia). The tower is believed to have existed since 1530. It was near Eski Mosque in the former Orta Bunar Neighborhood (Macedonian: Орта Бунар Маало). It was demolished after the Second World War.

== See also ==
- Kumanovo
- Buildings in Kumanovo
