= Clock Tower (Podgorica) =

Sahat kula
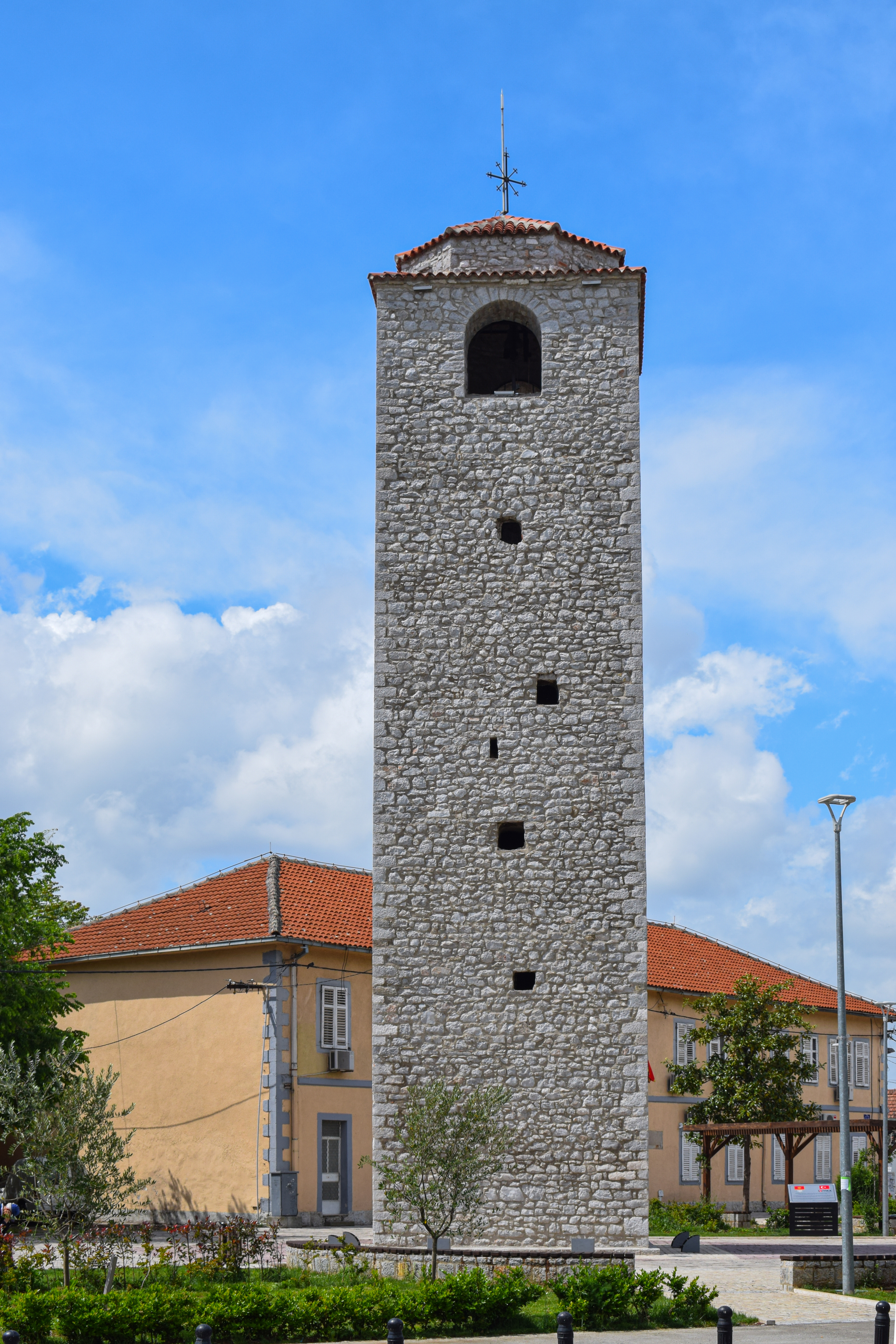
- The Clock Tower in 2019

General information
- Type: clock tower
- Location: Podgorica, Montenegro
- Coordinates: 42.435557°N 19.260014°E
- Completed: 1667

Height
- Height: 19 m (62 ft)

The Clock Tower (Montenegrin: Сат кула, romanized: Sat kula; Turkish: Saat Kulesi) of Podgorica, Montenegro, is located at Bećir Beg Osmanagić square, in the Stara Varoš neighborhood (the old town). It is one of the very few Ottoman landmarks that survived the bombing of Podgorica in World War II.

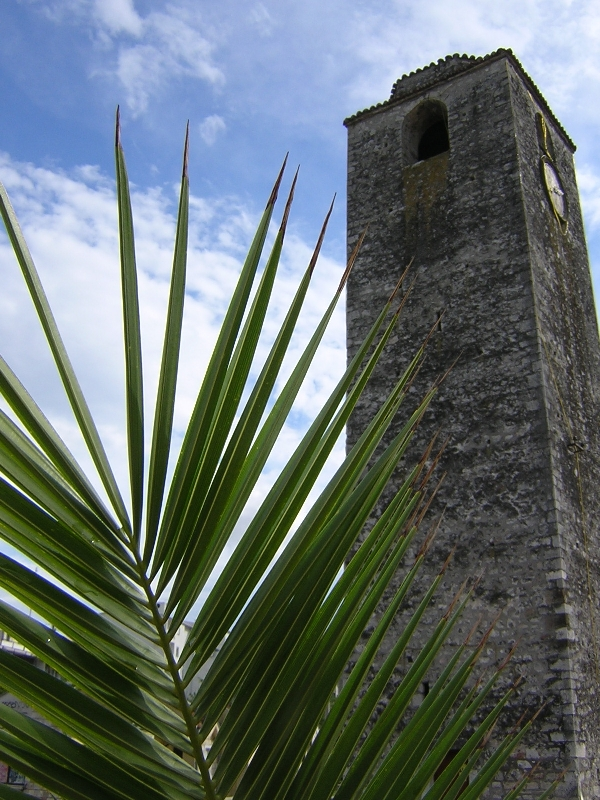
Detail of the clock tower

== History ==
Sahat Kula was built in 1667, by Hadži-paša Osmanagić, a prominent citizen of Podgorica. It is a freestanding 19 m (62 ft) tall stone clock tower.

Its current turret clock mechanism was made in 1890 by Pietro Colbachini foundry in Bassano del Grappa, Italy, after Podgorica was incorporated into Montenegro (the original mechanism was made in Austria). Around the same time, a metal cross was installed at the top of the tower, symbolizing transfer of the city from the Ottomans into the hands of Christian Montenegrins. The cross was made by Stevan Radović, Lazar Radović's grandfather.

Today, Sahat Kula is an important cultural monument of Montenegro, protected by law. The clock was renovated in January 2012, when a new electric mechanism was installed, as the old one was kept for historic significance.
