= Špiro Mugoša Airport =

Špiro Mugoša Airport Ćemovsko Polje Airport
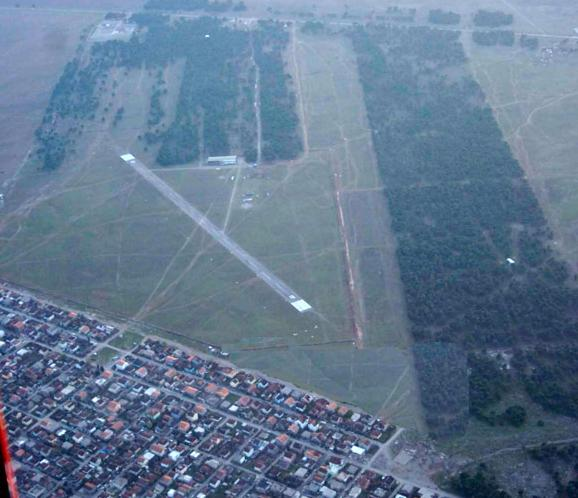
- IATA: none; ICAO: none

Summary
- Airport type: Public (sport and training)
- Owner: Aero Club Špiro Mugoša
- Operator: Aero Club Krila Podgorice
- Serves: Podgorica, Montenegro
- Location: Stari Aerodrom, Podgorica
- Elevation AMSL: 197 ft / 60 m
- Interactive map of Špiro Mugoša Airport

Runways
Direction	Length		Surface
Direction	ft	m	Surface
18/36	2,625	800	Asphalt
18/36	2,790	850	Grass

Špiro Mugoša Airport (Montenegrin: Aerodrom Špiro Mugoša), also known as Ćemovsko Polje Airport (Montenegrin: Aerodrom Ćemovsko Polje), is a general aviation airport, located in Ćemovsko polje, on the eastern edge of Podgorica urban area.

During World War II, Podgorica airfield was used by the occupying Axis powers, making it a target for devastating Allied bombings in 1943 and 1944. It was a sole airfield serving Podgorica until Podgorica Airport was opened in 1961.

Airport initially featured a single grass runway, while paved 800 m × 22 m (2,625 ft × 72 ft) runway was constructed in 1994. Aero Clubs Špiro Mugosa and Krila Podgorice are based at the airport, frequently hosting parachuting, gliding, and other air sports events.

== See also ==
- Airports of Montenegro
