= Sarajevo Clock Tower =

Clock tower in Sarajevo, Bosnia and Herzegovina

Coordinates: 43°51′33″N 18°25′43″E

- Sarajevska sahat-kula (Bosnian)
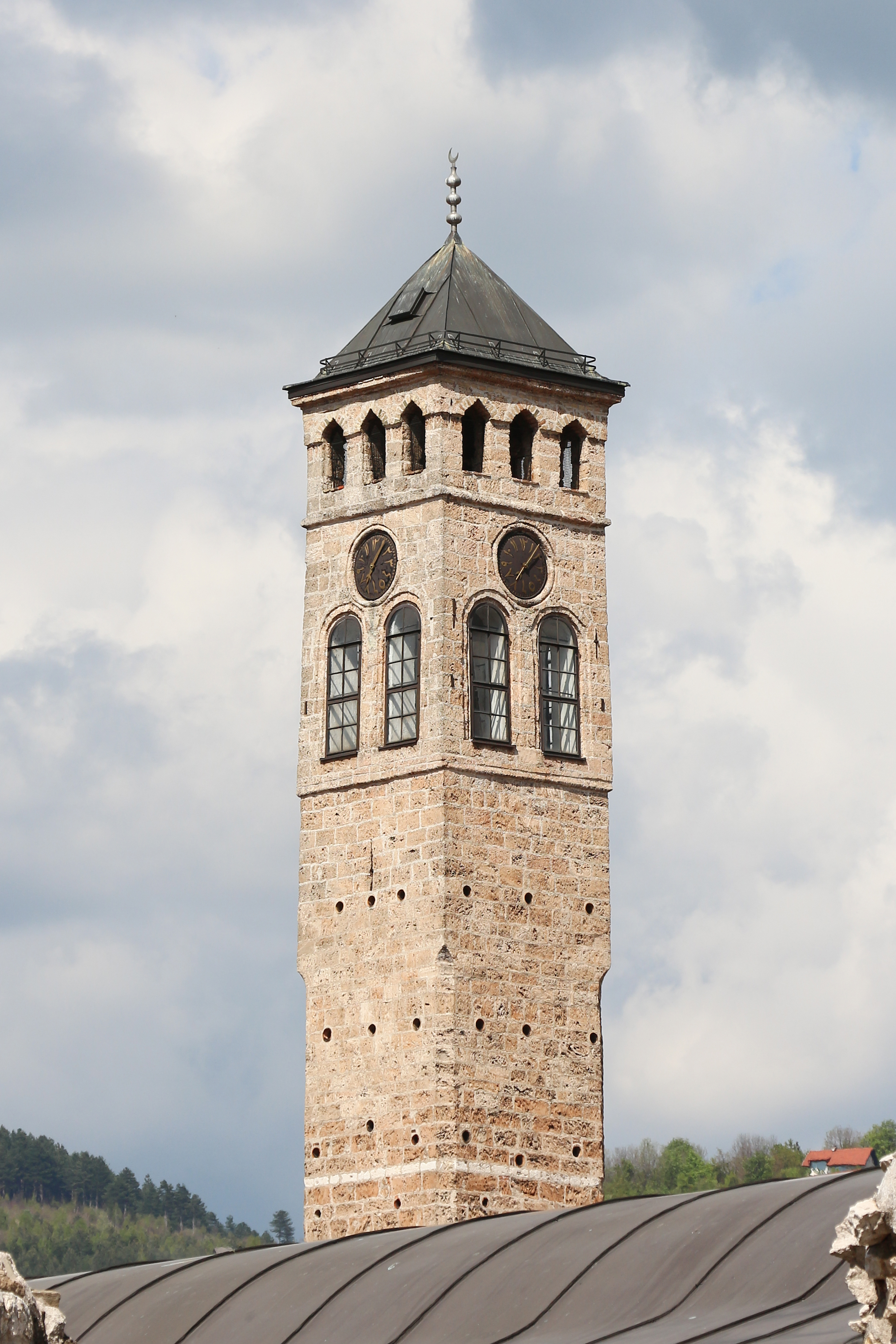
- Sarajevo Clock Tower above roofs of surrounding buildings
- Interactive map of Sarajevo Clock Tower
- Type: Clock tower
- Location: Baščaršija

History
- Founded: early 17th century
- Founder: Gazi Husrev Bey
- Original use: public

Site notes
- Height: 30 m (98 ft)
- Architectural styles: Ottoman, vernacular
- Restored: 1697 – the tower was renovated after the fire caused by Eugene of Savoy; 1762/63 – repairs. The cost was 895 akči (memorial to the GH quadrennial, Sarajevo 1932).; 1831 – the clock tower was damaged by fire; 1832 – repaired. The repairs cost 185 groschen.; 1875 – the upper part of the clock tower was rebuilt and altered to allow for clock faces that could easily be seen to be incorporated; 1931 – repairs; 1955 – conservation and restoration works; 1984 – repairs; 1996 – war damage made good
- Governing body: Gazi Husrev Bey Foundation
- Owner: Gazi Husrev Bey Foundation

KONS of Bosnia and Herzegovina
- Official name: Sarajevo Clock Tower
- Type: historic urban site
- Criteria: II. Value; A, B, C iii.iv., D ii.iv., E i.ii.iii.iv.v., F i.ii.iii., G i.ii.iii.iv.v.vi.vii, H i.ii., I i.ii.iii.
- Designated: 21 January 2003 (?th session)
- Part of: Baščaršija
- Reference no.: 780
- Decision no.: 01-278/02
- Operator: Gazi Husrev Bey Foundation

The Sarajevo Clock Tower (Bosnian: Sarajevska sahat-kula) is a clock tower in Sarajevo, the capital of Bosnia and Herzegovina. It is located beside Gazi Husrev-beg Mosque and is the tallest of the 21 clock towers erected throughout the country, reaching a height of 30 meters. The tower was declared a National Monument of Bosnia and Herzegovina in 2006.

The clock shows lunar time, in which the hands indicate 12 o'clock at the moment of sunset, the time of the Muslim Maghrib prayer. A caretaker, called the muvakkit ("timekeeper"), sets the clock's time manually once a week.

== History ==
The Sarajevo Clock Tower was constructed by Gazi Husrev-beg, a governor of the area during the Ottoman period. The earliest known documented mention of the tower dates to the 17th century in a work by Evliya Çelebi. It was rebuilt twice, once after fire damage when the city was attacked by Prince Eugene of Savoy in 1697, and again in 1762.

In 1874, the clock was replaced by a mechanism made by Gillett & Bland of London. The previous Turkish mechanism was moved to a mosque in the neighbourhood of Vratnik.

In 1967, the clock was repaired, and the hands and numbers on all four clock faces were gilt.

In 2006, the clock tower was declared a National Monument of Bosnia and Herzegovina by the Commission to Preserve National Monuments of Bosnia and Herzegovina.

== See also ==
- List of National Monuments of Bosnia and Herzegovina
- Baščaršija
