= Pobrežje, Croatia =

Pobrežje
- Village
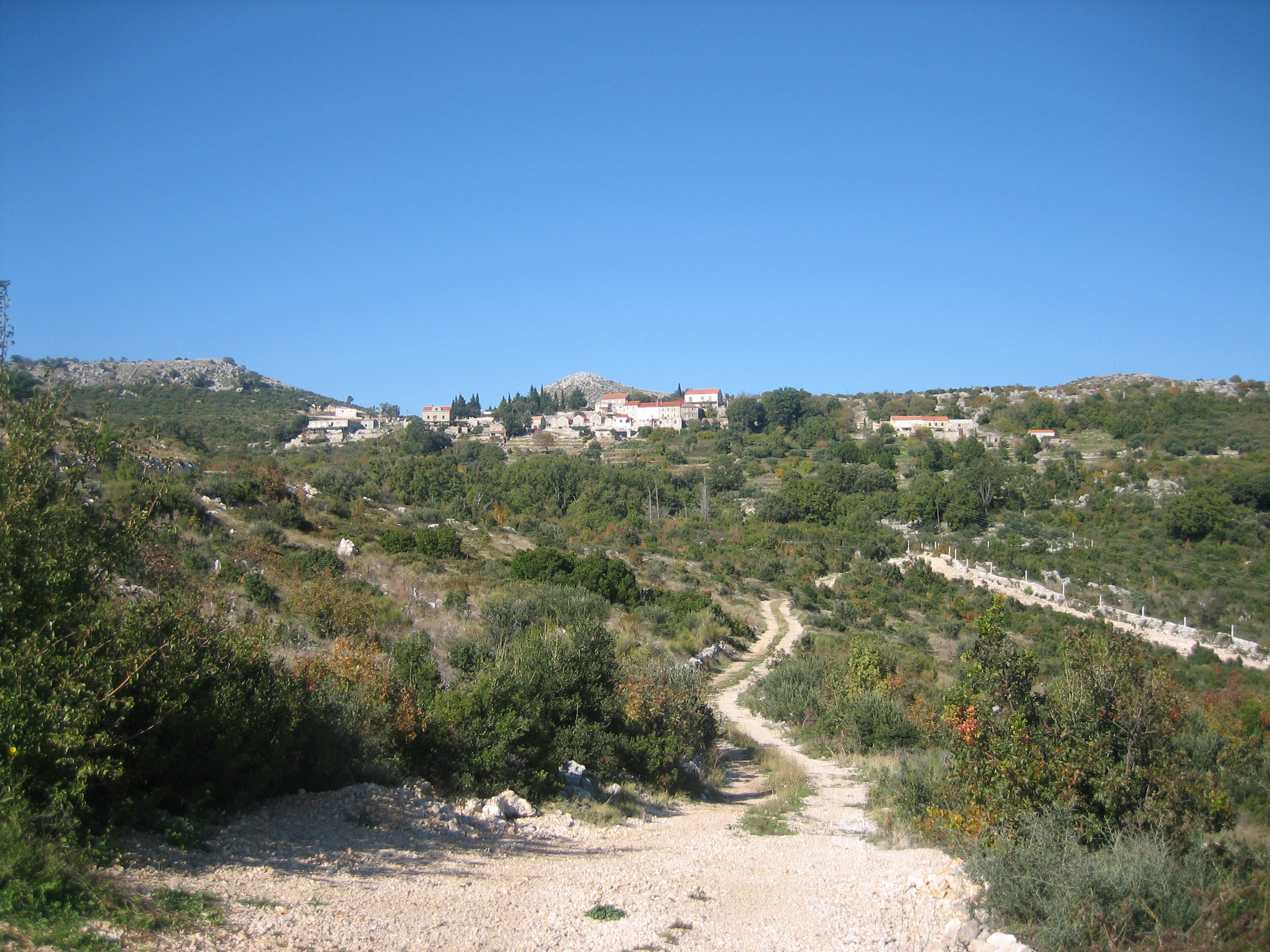

- Location within Croatia
- Coordinates: 42.6774365°N 18.0648866°E
- Country: Croatia
- County: Dubrovnik-Neretva County
- Municipality: Dubrovnik

Area
  - Total: 0.39 sq mi (1.0 km^{2})

Population (2021)
  - Total: 169
  - Density: 440/sq mi (170/km^{2})
- Time zone: UTC+1 (CET)
  - Summer (DST): UTC+2 (CEST)

Pobrežje is a village in Croatia.

== Demographics ==
According to the 2021 census, its population was 169.
