= Momišići =

Suburb of Podgorica, Montenegro

- Interactive map of Momišići
- Coordinates: 42°26′52″N 19°15′15″E
- Time zone: UTC+1

Momišići (Montenegrin: Момишићи) is a suburb of Podgorica, Montenegro.

The neighbourhood curves around the foot of Malo Brdo ("Little Hill"), and up its southeastern slopes. It consists mostly of lowrise private family houses, except in its southern tip, which is home to University of Montenegro's Faculty of Economics and Faculty of Law buildings, Podgorica Basic Court, and various residential highrise buildings.

== See also ==
- List of Podgorica neighbourhoods and suburbs#Momišići
