= Stari Aerodrom, Podgorica =

Stari Aerodrom Стари аеродром
- Neighbourhood
- Location within Montenegro
- Coordinates: 42°25′44″N 19°16′33″E
- Country: Montenegro
- City: Podgorica

Population (1991)
  - Total: 5,285

Stari Aerodrom (Montenegrin: Стари аеродром) is a neighbourhood in the city of Podgorica that borders the neighborhoods of Ribnica, Vrela Ribnička, Drač and Tuški put. The neighbourhood is located beside an old military airport, Ćemovsko Polje Airport, hence the name "Stari Aerodrom". It is one of three neighbourhoods that comprise the Konik suburb, as well as one of the few neighbourhoods that have seen a large construction boom.

One of Podgorica's prominent hotels, Hotel Kosta's, along with one of Podgorica's main electronic stores, TechnoLux, are in Stari Aerodrom.

The neighbourhood houses the Albanian and Polish embassies to Montenegro, as well as the national Coca-Cola bottling plant, owned by Coca-Cola HBC.

== History ==
=== 2000s construction boom ===
As the 2006 independence referendum was looming, Stari Aerodrom became among the newest sites of a construction boom as part of Podgorica's everlasting expansion. Many new residential buildings and commercial spaces were built.

=== Veljko Vlahović Boulevard ===
The Veljko Vlahović Boulevard is set to stretch two kilometers, boasting six traffic lanes. In certain stretches, it will span nearly 50 meters in width, marking a significant investment in traffic infrastructure for this micro-locality. Valued at EUR 1.6 million, this project stands as the sole focus in this area. Additionally, in close proximity to this development, the construction of the Home for the Elderly is nearing completion, bringing the total investment in the vicinity to nearly EUR 20 million.

== Geography ==
Stari Aerodrom is bordered to the north by the Fifth Proletarian Brigade Boulevard (Bulevar V Proleterske Brigade) and by the E762 - Tuzi Road / Radomir Ivanović Road (Tuški put / Put Radomira Ivanovića) to the south. To the east is Ćemovsko Polje and to the west railway tracks operated by Railways of Montenegro.

Major streets in Stari Aerodrom include Josip Broz Tito Boulevard (Bulevar Josipa Broza Tita) and Veljko Vlahović Boulevard (Bulevar Veljka Vlahovića).

== Culture ==
=== Sports ===
Stari Aerodrom features practice grounds for several of Podgorica's prominent football clubs, including FK Budućnost and FK Mladost. Other practice fields also exist for use by the Football Association of Montenegro.

== Education ==
Pavle Rovinski Elementary School (Osnovna škola „Pavle Rovinski“) is a primary school in Stari Aerodrom.

== Demographics ==
According to the 1991 census, Stari Aerodrom had 5,285 residents.

Ethnicity	Number	Percentage
Montenegrins	3,998	75.65%
Serbs	426	8.06%
Yugoslavs	43	0.81%
Bosniaks	11	0.21%
Albanians	10	0.19%
Roma	9	0.17%
Others	778	14.72%
Total	5,285	100%
