= Ribnica (Morača) =

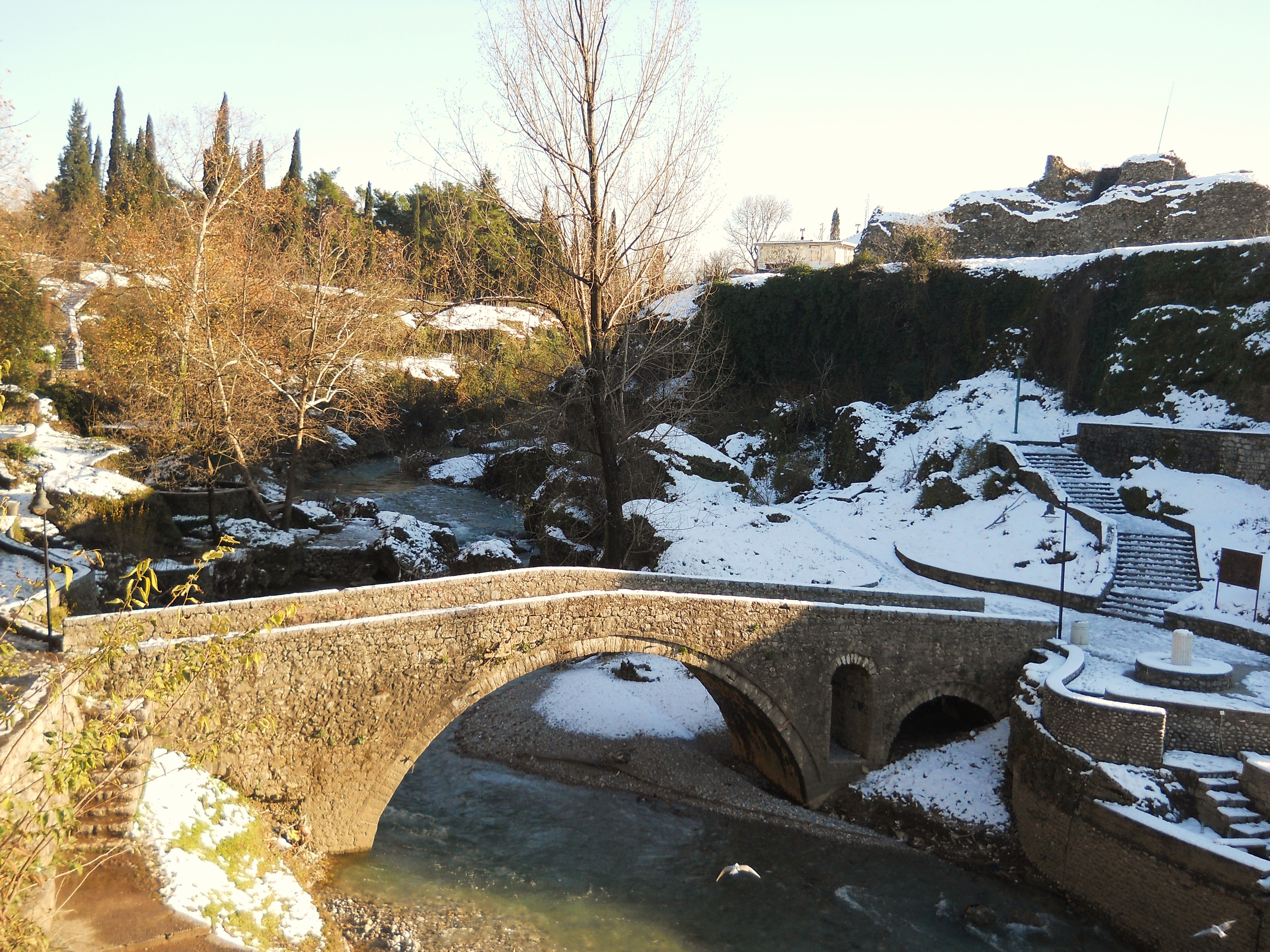
- Adži-paša's bridge over the river Ribnica

Location
- Country: Montenegro

Physical characteristics
- Mouth
  - location: Morača
  - coordinates: 42.4395°N 19.2583°E

Basin features
- Progression: Morača→ Lake Skadar→ Bojana→ Adriatic Sea

The Ribnica (Montenegrin Cyrillic: Рибница, pronounced [rîbnit͡sa]) is a small river that runs through Podgorica, Montenegro.

It is a tributary to the river Morača, their confluence being at the city centre. It is usually dries up in the summer. Podgorica was known as "Ribnica" after the Ribnica River in the Middle Ages. Today, an area of Podgorica, Vrela Ribnička, is named after the river, which flows through the area as well.
