= Bombing of Podgorica in World War II =

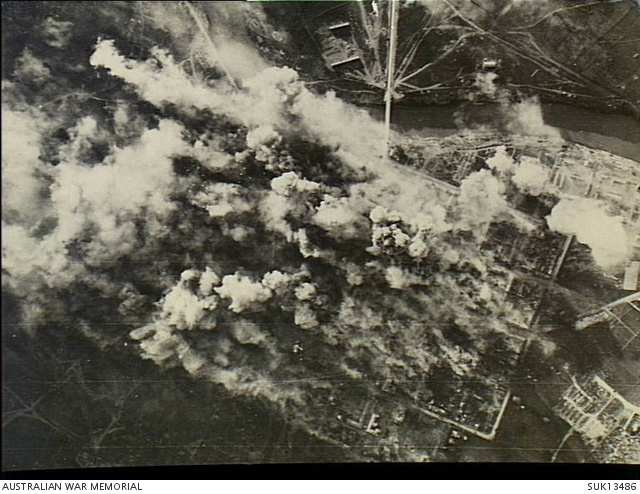
Strike photograph of the daylight attack by Liberator, Wellington and Halifax aircraft of the RAF on the Yugoslav town of Podgorica. German escort vehicles, with troops escaping from Greece, had waited in that town for darkness to fall before they fled northwards.

The bombing of Podgorica in World War II was carried out by the Allies from 1943 to 1944 at the request of the Yugoslav Partisans.

== Background ==
Between the two World Wars, Podgorica had a population of 13,000.

On 6 April 1941, the Kingdom of Yugoslavia was invaded by the Axis powers. The state was de facto dissolved, and Montenegro, in which Podgorica was the largest city, became independent as a protectorate of the Kingdom of Italy. That arrangement lasted until the Italian armistice on September 8, 1943, and the fascist Italian forces capitulated. Germany then occupied Montenegro. Until Germany's involvement, the city had not been bombed. During the last years of the war, Podgorica was one of the largest cities on the route of German troops withdrawing from Greece and so the decision was made by the Allies to bomb the city.

== Initial stage of bombing ==
The Podgorica airfield was bombed by P-39 Airacobras of the United States Army Air Forces's Twelfth Air Force on 25 October 1943. By December, the German troops had begun setting off bomb sirens in the city, which resulted in many citizens taking shelter in nearby caves.

== Bombing of 5 May 1944 ==
The most intense bombing of Podgorica occurred on 5 May 1944. 116 USAAF B-24 Liberators participated in the attack, which dropped 270 tonnes of bombs on the city. The attack resulted in only four German casualties and approximately 100 Chetnik deaths, and 400 Montenegrin civilians were killed. Chetnik casualties included major Đorđije Lašić. During the course of the bombing, a Catholic church and an Orthodox cemetery were damaged, and the Glavatović mosque was destroyed.

The Allied bombing was of questionable legality. International law dictates that a country's recognized government has the right to bombard any of its cities that is occupied by enemy forces. However, when Anglo-American forces bombed the city, they still officially recognized the Yugoslav royal government-in-exile as the legitimate national government, not Tito, who ordered the bombings.

== Final stage of bombing ==
On 6 November, 72 Royal Air Force planes bombed the city. Reportedly, 700 German troops were killed and 150 German vehicles were smashed during the attack. On 7 November, 124 P-38s strafed Axis troop concentrations in and around the city.

== Aftermath ==
The Allied bombing almost completely destroyed the city. Approximately 4,100 people died in the attacks. Partisans took over Podgorica on 19 December 1944. Damages were estimated in 1946 as 1.06 billion Yugoslav dinars.
