= Republic Square =

Republic Square may refer to:

== Argentina ==
- Plaza de la República (Buenos Aires), Argentina

== Armenia ==
- Republic Square, Yerevan

== Croatia ==
- Republic Square (Zagreb), a former name of the Ban Jelačić Square

== Czech Republic ==
- Náměstí Republiky, Prague

== France ==
- Place de la République (Lyon)
- Place de la République, Paris
- Place de la République (Strasbourg)

== Georgia ==
- Rose Revolution Square, until 2005 Republic Square in Tbilisi

== Germany ==
- Platz der Republik (Berlin)
- Platz der Republik (Hamburg)
- Platz der Republik (Mönchengladbach)

== Italy ==
- Piazza della Repubblica, Florence
- Piazza della Repubblica (Novara), see Novara Cathedral
- Piazza della Repubblica, Rome

== Kazakhstan ==
- Republic Square, Almaty

== Malta ==
- Republic Square, Valletta
- Republic Square, Tarxien, see List of squares in Malta
- Republic Square, Żejtun, see List of squares in Malta

== Mexico ==
- Plaza de la República, Mexico City, site of the Monumento a la Revolución

== Montenegro ==
- Republic Square, Podgorica

== Nicaragua ==
- Plaza de la Revolución (formerly Plaza de la República), Managua

== Poland ==
- Republic Square, a former name of the Victory Square in Szczecin

== Serbia ==
- Republic Square, Belgrade
- Republic Square, Novi Sad
- Republic Square, Niš
- Republic Square, Niška Banja
- Republic Square, Smederevo
- Republic Square, Sombor
- Republic Square, Požarevac
- Republic Square, Vranje

== Slovenia ==
- Republic Square, Ljubljana

== Spain ==
- Plaça de la República, Barcelona

== United States ==
- Republic Square (Austin) in Austin, Texas, see Thomas W. Ward

== See also ==
- Náměstí Republiky (disambiguation)
- Platz der Republik (disambiguation)
- Praça da República (disambiguation)
- Plaza de la República (disambiguation)
- Piazza della Repubblica (disambiguation)
- Place de la République (disambiguation)
- Republic Plaza (disambiguation)
- Trg Republike (disambiguation)
