= Place de la République (disambiguation) =

Place de la République is a square in Paris.

Place de la République may also refer to:

- Place de la République, Lyon
- Place de la République, Strasbourg

== See also ==
- Náměstí Republiky (disambiguation)
- Praça da República (disambiguation)
- Platz der Republik (disambiguation)
- Plaza de la República (disambiguation)
- Piazza della Repubblica (disambiguation)
- Republic Square (disambiguation)
