= Trg Republike =

Trg Republike means Republic Square in most South Slavic languages and may refer to:

== Croatia ==
- Trg Republike or Republic Square, a former name of the Ban Jelačić Square in Zagreb

== Serbia ==
- Republic Square (Belgrade)
- Republic Square (Novi Sad)
- Republic Square (Niš)
- Republic Square (Niška Banja)
- Republic Square (Smederevo)
- Republic Square (Sombor)
- Republic Square (Požarevac)
- Republic Square (Vranje)

== Montenegro ==
- Republic Square (Podgorica)

== Slovenia ==
- Republic Square (Ljubljana)

== See also ==
- Republic Square (disambiguation)
