= Republic Plaza =

Republic Plaza or Republic Building may refer to:

in Singapore

- Republic Plaza (Singapore)

in Sri Lanka

- Republic Building, Colombo

in the United States (by state)

- Tribune-Republic Building, San Luis Obispo, California, listed on the National Register of Historic Places (NRHP) in San Luis Obispo County, California
- Republic Plaza (Denver), Colorado
- The Republic Newspaper Office, Columbus, Indiana, NRHP-listed
- Republic Building (Louisville, Kentucky), NRHP-listed
- Republic Iron and Steel Office Building, Youngstown, Ohio, listed on the NRHP in Mahoning County, Ohio
- Republic National Bank, Dallas, Texas, NRHP-listed
- Republic Building (Seattle), Washington, currently known as the Melbourne Tower
- Republic Building (Washington, D.C.)

== See also ==
- Republic Theater (disambiguation)
- Republic Square (disambiguation)
- Republican Block, Springfield, Massachusetts, NRHP-listed
