= Náměstí Republiky =

Náměstí Republiky may refer to:

- Náměstí Republiky, Prague
  - Náměstí Republiky (Prague Metro)
- Náměstí Republiky, Plzeň

== See also ==
- Republic Square (disambiguation)
- Praça da República (disambiguation)
- Plaza de la República (disambiguation)
- Piazza della Repubblica (disambiguation)
