= Praça da República =

Praça da República may refer to:

- Praça da República (Póvoa de Varzim)
- Praça da República (Rio de Janeiro)
- Praça da República (São Paulo)

== See also ==
- Republic Square (disambiguation)
- Náměstí Republiky (disambiguation)
- Plaza de la República (disambiguation)
- Piazza della Repubblica (disambiguation)
