= The Republican (Springfield, Massachusetts) =

Newspaper published in Springfield, Massachusetts

- The October 17, 2018, front page of The Republican
- Type: Daily newspaper
- Format: Broadsheet
- Owner: Advance Publications
- Founder: Samuel Bowles II
- Publisher: George Arwady
- Editor: Larry Parnass
- Founded: September 8, 1824 (202 years ago)
- Language: English
- Headquarters: 1860 Main St, Springfield, MA; 01103
- City: Springfield, Massachusetts
- Country: United States
- Circulation: 7,799 (as of September 23, 2026)
- ISSN: 1941-529X (print); 2641-2829 (web)
- OCLC number: 52000893
- Website: masslive.com

The Republican is a newspaper based in Springfield, Massachusetts, covering news in the Greater Springfield area, as well as national news and pieces from Boston, Worcester and northern Connecticut.

It is owned by Newhouse Newspapers, a division of Advance Publications. Throughout much of the 19th century, the paper was the largest circulating daily in New England and the most widely-read across the U.S., and played a key role in the United States Republican Party's founding. Abraham Lincoln was an avid reader. The newspaper became the first American periodical to publish a poem authored by an African American writer.

By 2025, The Republican's daily circulation had plummeted to 8,593, according to an audit published in the newspaper on September 24, 2025. Content from The Republican is published online to MassLive, a separate Advance Publications company. MassLive had between 4.5 million and 8.4 million unique monthly visitors in 2025.

== Beginning ==
Established by Samuel Bowles II in 1824 as a rural weekly, the newspaper was converted into a daily in 1844. From the beginning, it focused on local news. As rapidly as possible, its news-gathering operation was extended until, and within a few years its columns contained items from every town and hamlet in the Pioneer Valley, as well as from Springfield. It achieved national renown in the 19th century under the tenure of Samuel Bowles III, a legacy that was passed to his son, Samuel Bowles IV, and grandson, Sherman Bowles.

== Politics ==
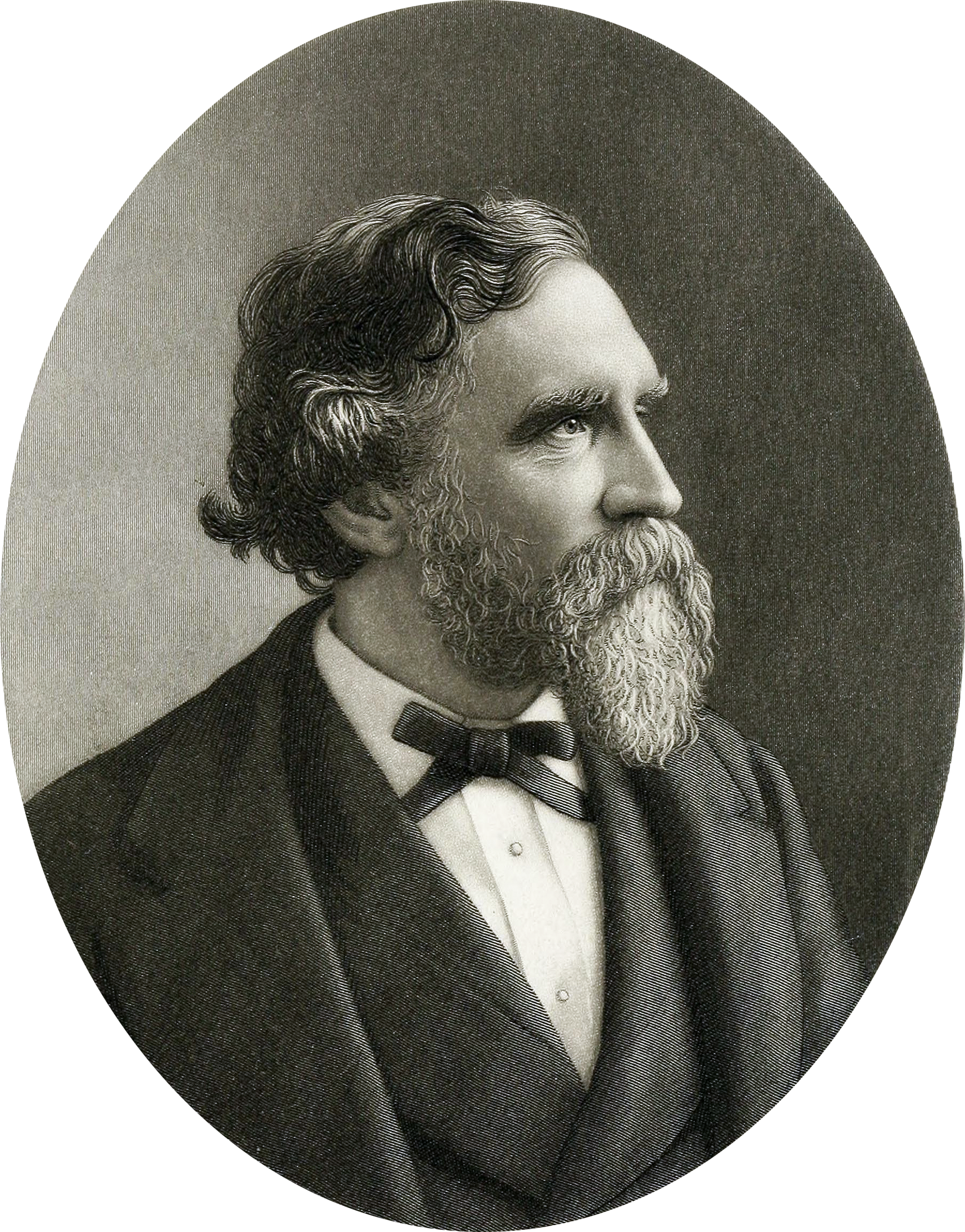
Samuel Bowles, (Note: Despite being one of three generations tied to the paper, "Samuel Bowles", without a generational suffix, usually refers to Samuel Bowles III.) transformed the paper into the largest circulating daily in New England by the mid-19th century, and is remembered for his influence on abolitionism and the Republican Party, as well as his mantra for journalists—"Put it all in the first sentence."

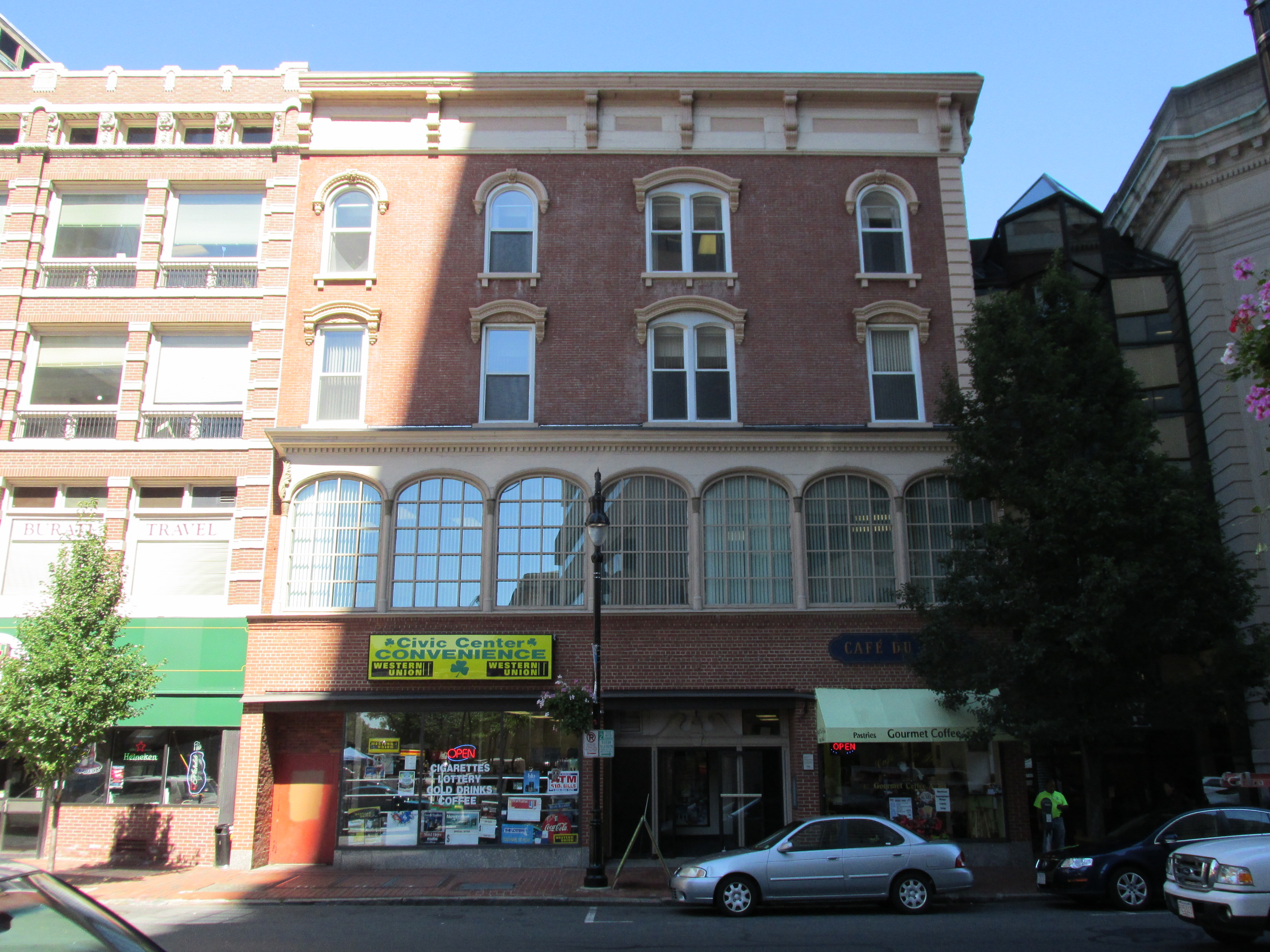
The historic Republican Block was home to The Republican from 1858 to 1867

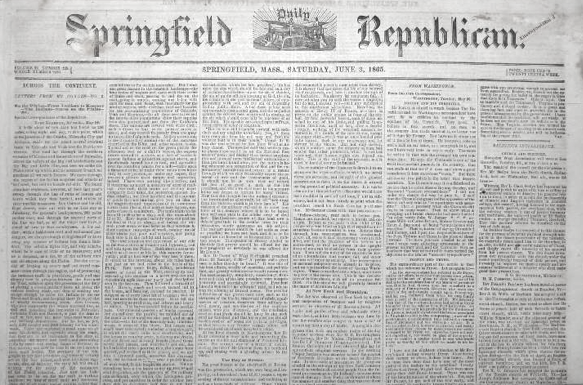
The Springfield Republican as it appeared during the Reconstruction era, 1865

In 1854, the newspaper reportedly became the first to publish the oldest known work of literature by an African American. A 16-year-old named Lucy Terry (1733–1821) witnessed two White families attacked by Native Americans in 1746. The fight took place in Deerfield, Mass. Known as “Bars Fight,” her poem was told orally until it was published thirty-three years after her death, first in The Springfield Daily Republican, on November 20, 1854. The poem appeared in Josiah Gilbert Holland's History of Western Massachusetts the following year.

In 1855, Bowles III called for the founding of a new party that would abolish slavery. He suggested the name "Republican". Once abolitionists founded a party by this name, The Republican became one of its most unrelenting supporters.

Bowles III believed that the newspaper should be a power in the moral, religious and literary, as well as the political life of the community, and he tried to make his paper fulfill those functions. With the aid of J. G. Holland and others who joined the staff the paper attained excellent literary quality and a high moral tone. Its opinions soon reached all New England, and after the formation of the Republican Party, they extended far beyond the limits of any section.

During the controversies affecting slavery and resulting in the American Civil War, Bowles supported, in general, the Whig and Republican parties, but in the period of Reconstruction under President Ulysses S. Grant, his paper represented anti-administration or Liberal Republican opinions, while in the disputed election of 1876 it favored the claims of Samuel J. Tilden, and subsequently became independent in politics. Its editorial board endorsed the Democratic candidate for president in every modern election, except the 2008 election, in which the newspaper, under publisher Larry McDermott, endorsed Republican John McCain in his failed White House bid. The newspaper subsequently endorsed President Barack Obama in his 2012 reelection campaign.

== Growth and changes ==
During Bowles' lifetime, and subsequently, the Republican office was a sort of school for young journalists, especially in the matter of pungency and conciseness of style, one of his maxims being: "put it all in the first paragraph".

In 1849, Bowles hired Josiah Gilbert Holland, a poet who had studied medicine and taught school in the American South. Soon, the assistant editor purchased an interest in the newspaper and wrote spiritual and advice columns.

Under the leadership of editor Bowles and assistant editor Holland, the Republican became the most widely-read and respected small town daily in America.

Bowles was an acquaintance of Emily Dickinson, and he published a handful of the very few poems that she printed in her lifetime, including "A narrow fellow in the grass" and "Safe in their alabaster chambers".

Bowles was succeeded as publisher and editor-in-chief of the Republican by his son Samuel Bowles (b. 1851).

Charles Dow, founder of Dow Jones and The Wall Street Journal, started his career as a business reporter for the Springfield Daily Republican as an apprentice to the newspaper's owner Samuel Bowles III.

The Republican launched the careers of several prominent journalists and novelists. I. E. "Sy" Sanborn, longtime Chicago sportswriter and one of the original organizers of the Baseball Writers' Association of America in 1908, began his career at The Republican. Radio's "poet laureate" Norman Corwin was a reporter for The Republican in the 1930s. Novelist Tom Wolfe was a reporter for The Springfield Union in the late 1950s.

The title "Ms." was first suggested by an anonymous 1901 letter to The Republican. The letter read, in part, "To call a maiden Mrs. is only a shade worse than to insult a matron with the inferior title Miss. Yet it is not always easy to know the facts... The abbreviation 'Ms.' is simple, it is easy to write, and the person concerned can translate it properly according to the circumstances."

In 1915, Samuel Bowles, who had been dead for nearly four decades, was compared to William Rockhill Nelson, publisher of The Kansas City Star, who died that year. "Of course, The Star was William R. Nelson even more than The Springfield Republican was Samuel Bowles," wrote the Chicago Post in a tribute.

During the 1920s, Sherman Bowles, son of Samuel Bowles IV, constructed a modern printing plant at 32 Cypress Street in Springfield and launched the hostile takeover of three competitors. His newspaper monopoly controlled a combined circulation of 280,000. He died on March 3, 1952, of a heart attack at the age of 61.

In 1960, Advance Publications, owned by the Newhouse family, purchased a 40 percent stock interest in the Republican Company, Inc., holder of The SpringfieId Union, The Springfield Sunday Republican and The Springfield Daily News. The Newark, New Jersey–based company had an agreement with the Bowles heirs to purchase their 45 percent stock holdings in the Springfield companies on Sept. 1, 1967. The purchase was opposed by the editors of the newspapers and a prolonged legal battle ensued. An organization called the Springfield Newspapers became the local division of the Newhouse family empire with David Starr, a vice president for Advance, serving as publisher.

The Springfield Daily News and the Morning Union merged operations in the 1970s, operating as separate papers, even endorsing different candidates for the same offices. The circulation for the Morning Union was reported at 128,041 on October 8, 1972. The Springfield Daily News circulation stood at 92,342 on September 30, 1972. Eventually the two newspapers were combined into The Union-News (a morning paper) in 1988, with The Sunday Republican published on Sundays.

Larry McDermott served as publisher for a decade beginning in 1999 and the newspaper reverted to its historical, pre-Union-News name of The Republican around 2003. At the start of McDermott's tenure, circulation for the Union-News was 90,555. By September 2005, it had slipped by less than 5 percent to 86,359. With McDermott's retirement in December 2009, George Arwady became publisher of The Republican. He was previously publisher of The Newark Star-Ledger, where he had threatened to shutter that newspaper amid financial crises.

In 2019, the New England Newspaper Association awarded The Republican its Newspaper of the Year as a daily, and among Sunday newspapers, for its investigative reporting on the Springfield Police Department controversies earlier that year.

Longtime editor and Yankee Quill winner Wayne E. Phaneuf retired in 2020 and was succeeded by Cynthia G. Simison and later Larry Parnass.

As with many daily newspapers, The Republican has seen its advertising base erode and circulation shrink in recent years. Its reported daily circulation was down to 7,799 in September 2026, a tenth of where it stood one quarter of a century earlier. The newspaper marked its 200th anniversary on September 8, 2024.

== Images ==
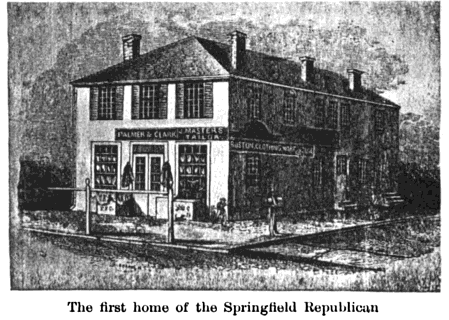
First Home of the Springfield Republican

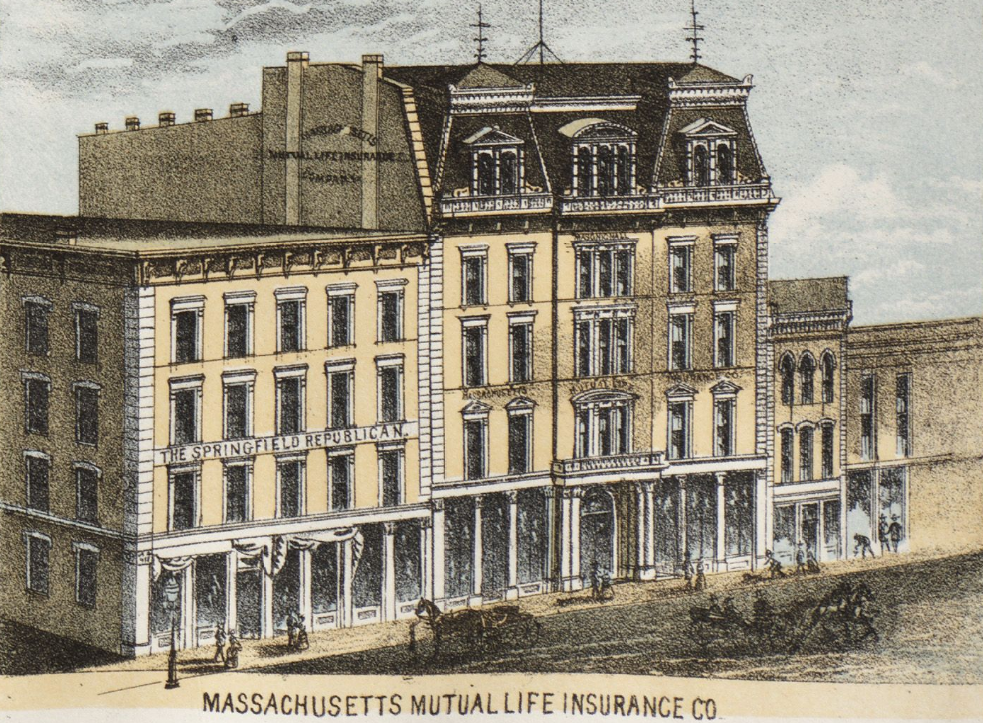
Springfield Republican building, 1875

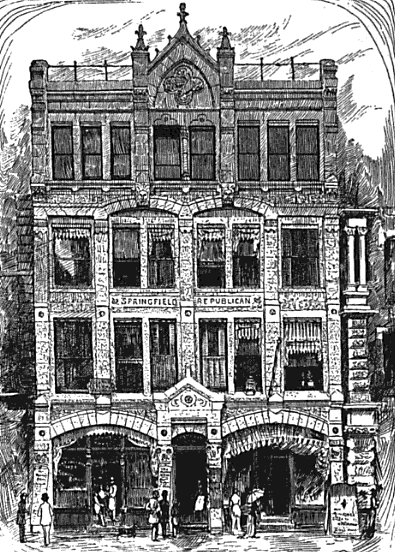
Springfield Republican building, 1880s

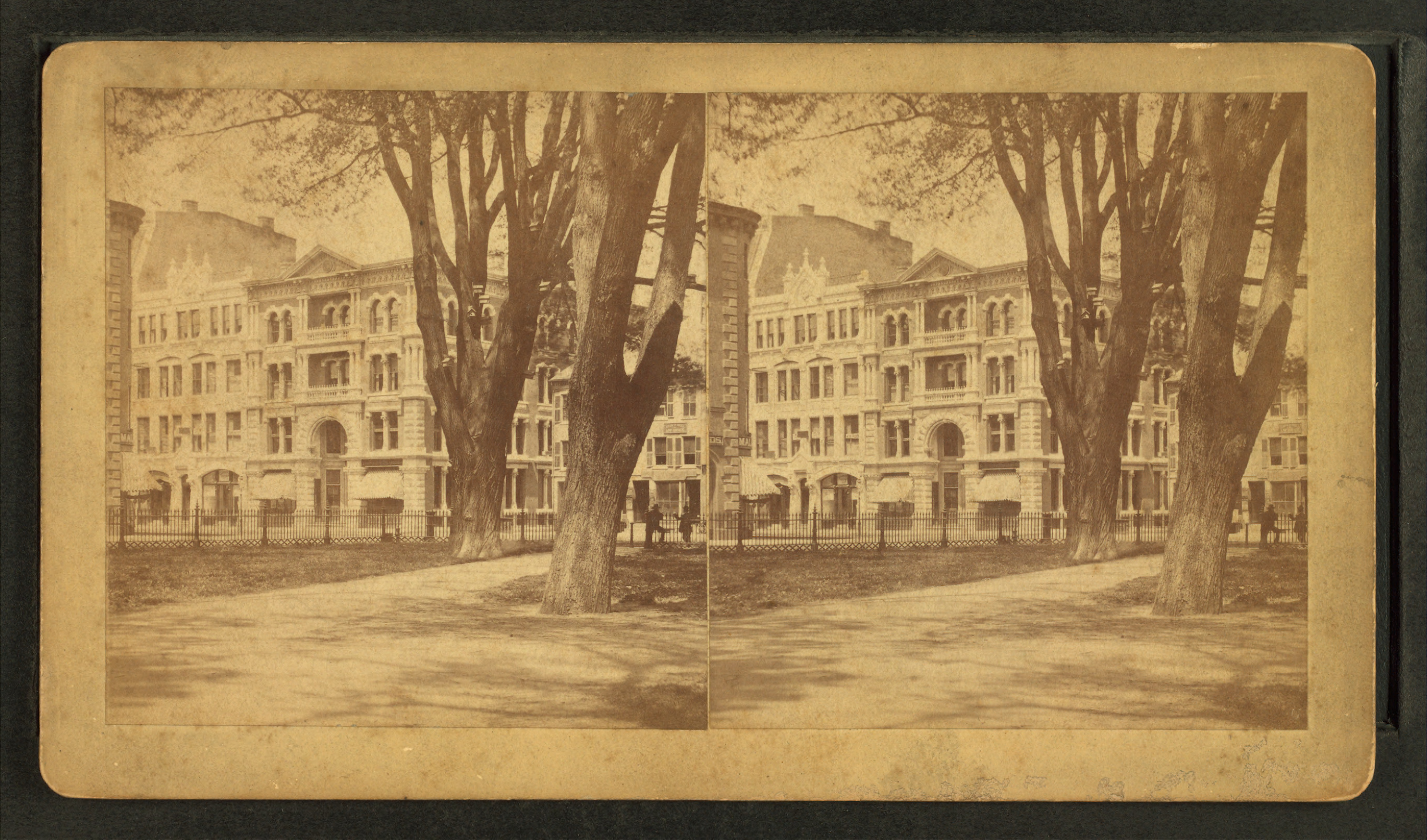
Republican block, Springfield (newspaper building at left), 19th century

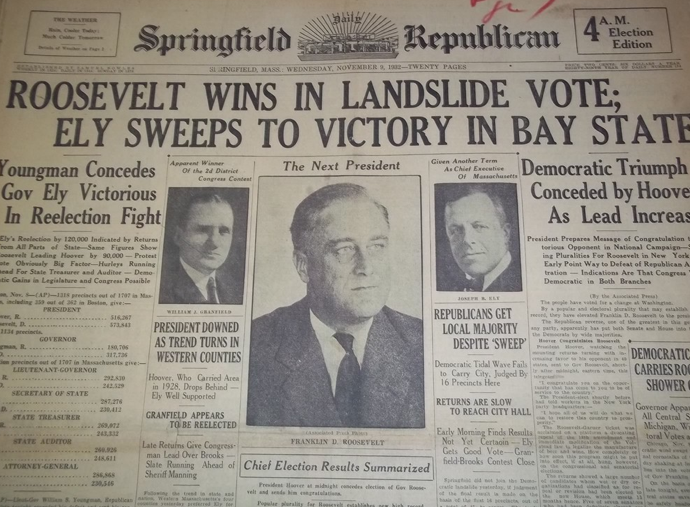
1932

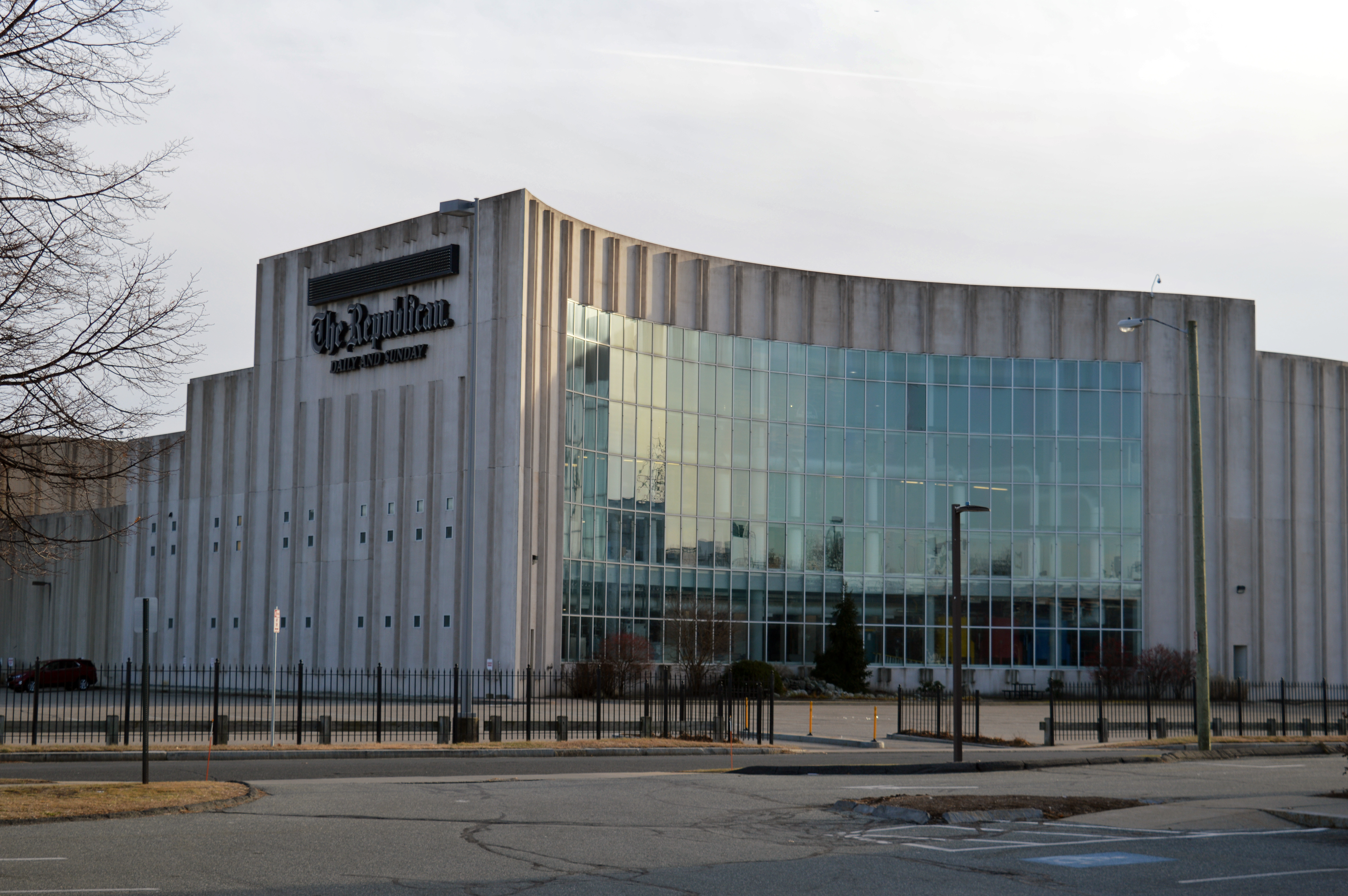
Current headquarters and printing facilities of The Republican, 2018

== See also ==
- Republican Block, the newspaper's home from 1858 to 1867
- History of American newspapers
- Josiah Gilbert Holland, assistant editor
- Dickinson (TV series), a creative reimagining of the poet and her life and social milieu, in Season 2 features actor Finn Jones who portrays Samuel Bowles.
