= Plaza de la República =

Plaza de la República may refer to:

- Plaza de la República (Buenos Aires)
- Plaza de la República Argentina
- Plaza de la República (Mexico City Metrobús, Line 1), a BRT station in Mexico City
- Plaza de la República (Mexico City Metrobús, Line 4), a BRT station in Mexico City

== See also ==
- Republic Square (disambiguation)
- Náměstí Republiky (disambiguation)
- Praça da República (disambiguation)
- Piazza della Repubblica (disambiguation)
