= Stuhlmannbrunnen =

Coordinates: 53.5497°N 9.9353°E

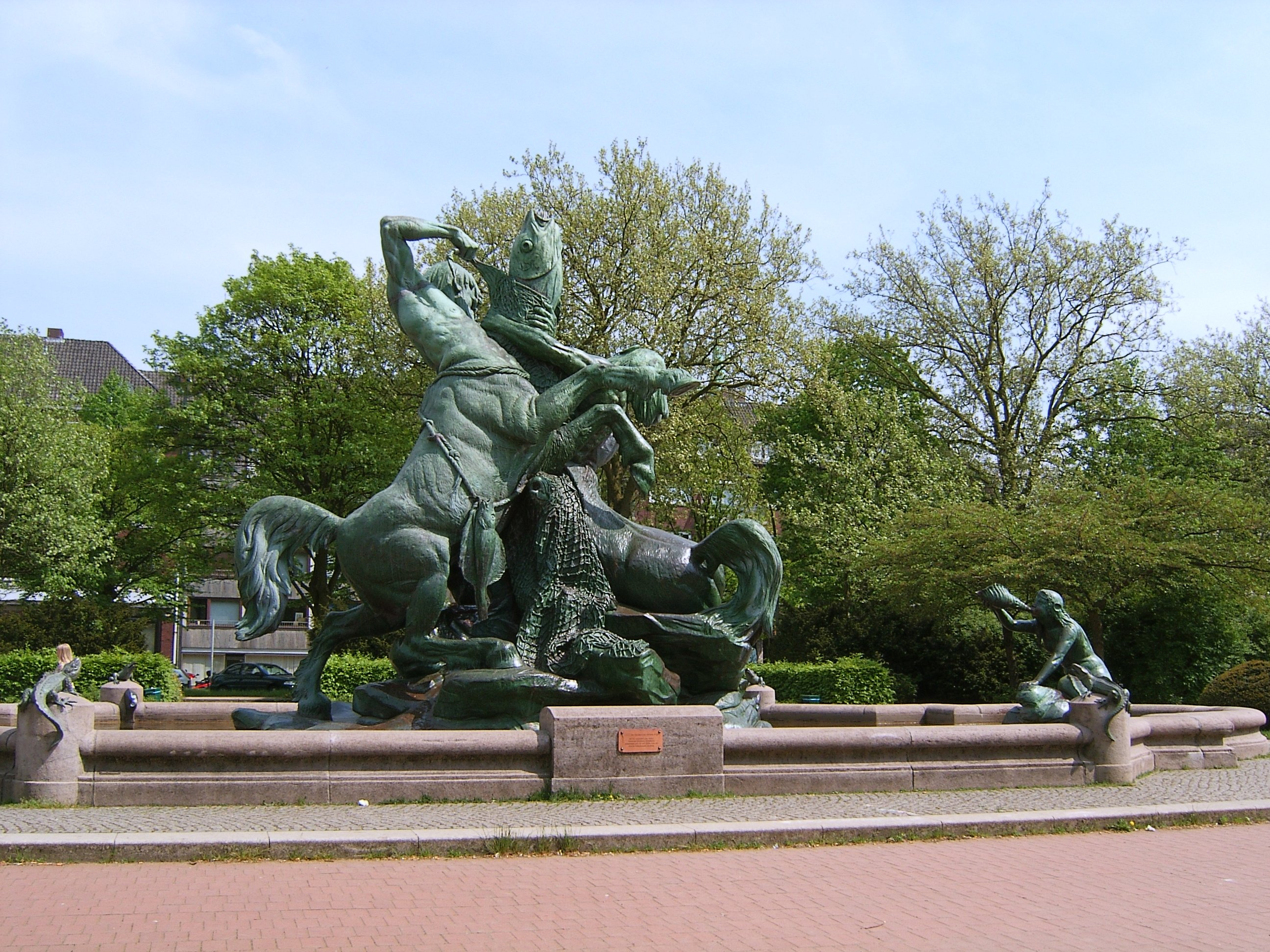
Stuhlmannbrunnen in Altona, Hamburg, in 2006

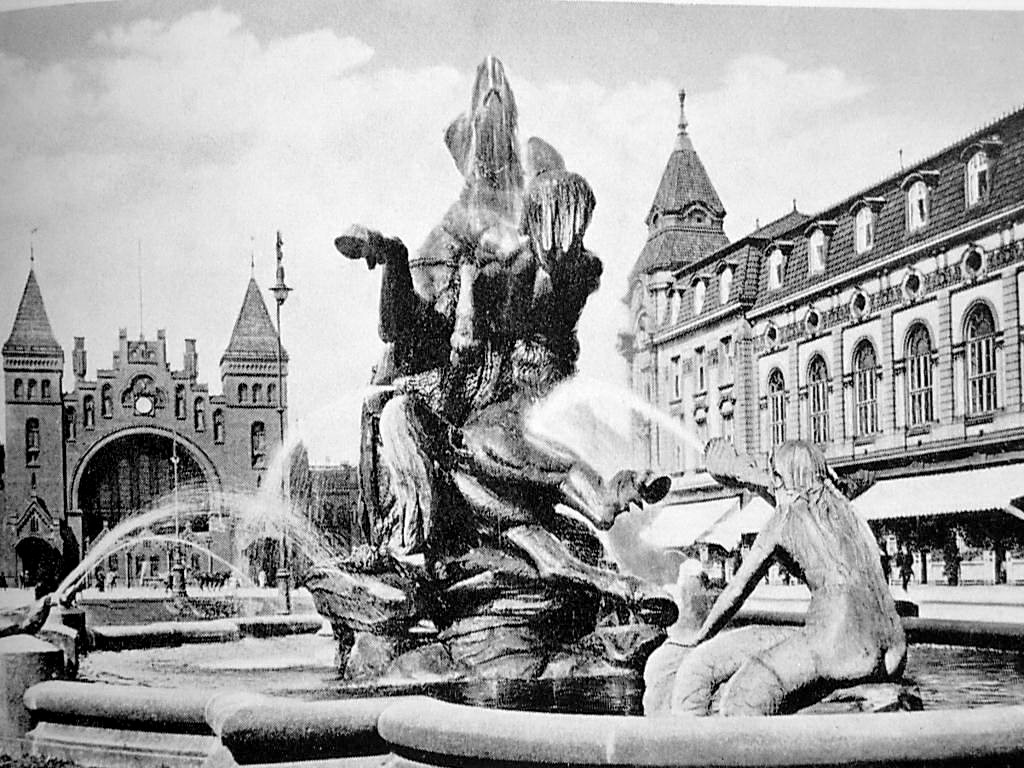
Stuhlmannbrunnen in front of the old Altona main station in 1912

The Stuhlmannbrunnen (Stuhlmann Fountain) is a fountain in Altona, Hamburg, Germany. It was inaugurated on pentecoast of 1900. It is located on the Platz der Republik (Square of the Republic) in Altona.

== History ==
The fountain is named after Günther Ludwig Stuhlmann, founder and director of Altonaer Gas- und Wasseranstalt AG, the gas and water works of Altona, which were built on his private ground at the banks of river Elbe. In the 1970s during the construction of the new Hamburg-Altona station, the fountain was removed and rebuilt in 1978 on a newly constructed ramp, closely approximate his old location at the station's entrance. However, because it lacked its monumental impression there, the fountain was relocated to the center of Republic Square in 2000. Since 2005 it is illuminated at night. The fountain is a cultural heritage monument. It was designed by Paul Türpe.

== Literature ==
- Hans Ehlers: Aus Altonas Vergangenheit. VGHA, Altona 1926
- Renata Klée Gobert: Die Bau- und Kunstdenkmale der Freien und Hansestadt Hamburg. Band II: Altona Elbvororte. C.Wegner, Hamburg 1959
- Stadtteilarchiv Ottensen e.V./Stiftung Denkmalpflege Hamburg (ed.): Der Stuhlmannbrunnen. Sinnbild und Wahrzeichen im Herzen Altonas. Dölling und Galitz, Hamburg 2000, ISBN 3-933374-72-3
- Christoph Timm: Altona-Altstadt und -Nord. Denkmaltopographie Bundesrepublik Deutschland. Christians, Hamburg 1987, ISBN 3-7672-9997-6
