= List of squares in Malta =

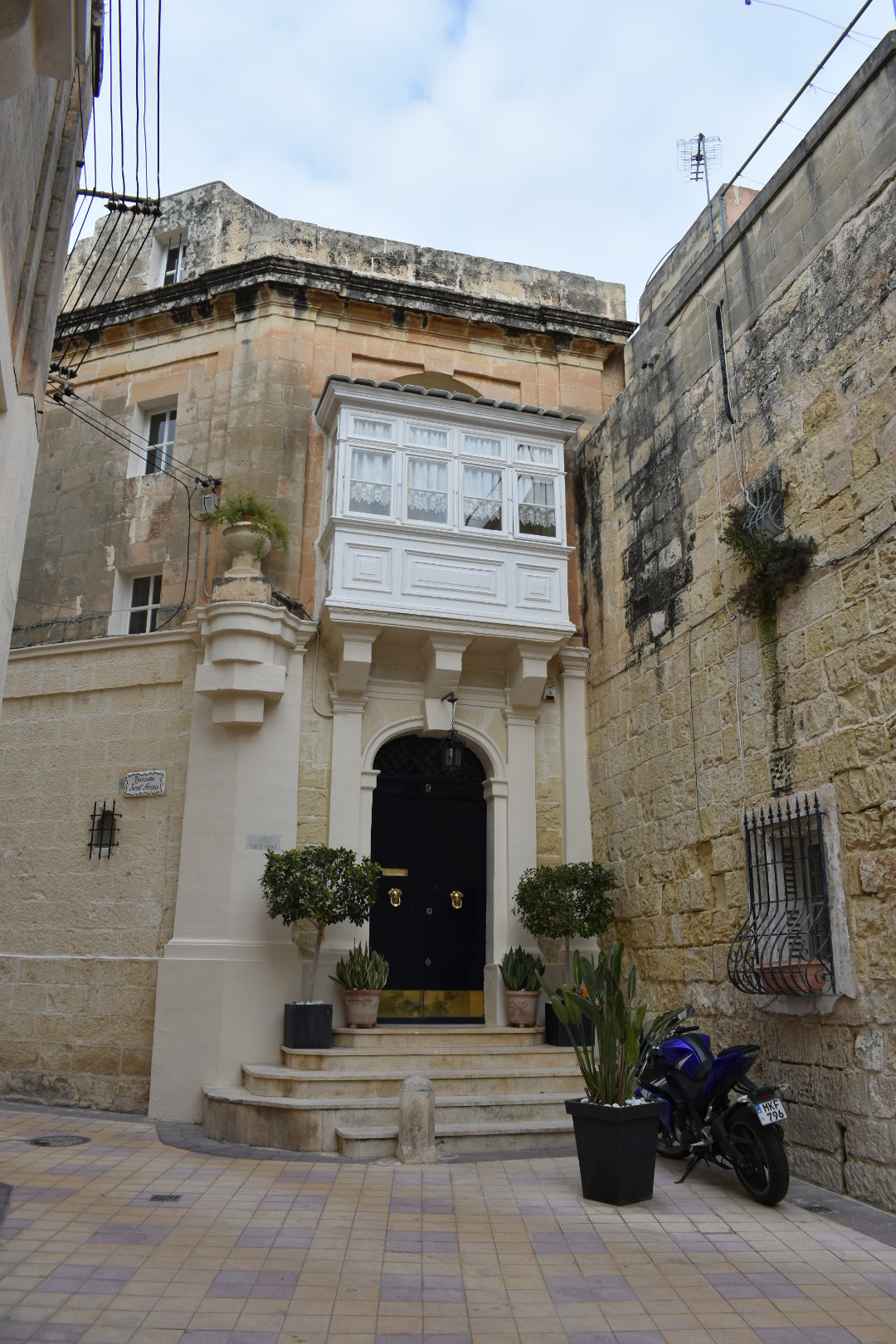
A house on Pjazzetta Sant' Anna.

This is a list of squares in Malta. It includes the main square in every locality of Republic of Malta situated on the islands of Malta, Gozo and Comino.

== Attard ==
- Bay Square (Wesgħat il-Plajja)
- Church Square (Misraħ il-Knisja) - The main square of Attard.
- John Paul II Square (Misraħ Ġwanni Pawlu II)
- St. Anne Square (Pjazzetta Sant' Anna)

== Balzan ==
- Robert Fenech Square (Pjazza Bertu Fenech) - The main and only square in Balzan.
- Profs. Aquilina Square (Wesgħa Profs Ġużè Aquilina)

== Birgu ==
- Mattia Preti Square (Wesgħa Mattia Preti)
- St. Philip Square (Pjazzetta San Filippu)
- Victory Square (Pjazza tal-Belt Vittoriosa) - The main square of Birgu (Città Vittoriosa)

== Birkirkara ==
- 28th February Square (Misraħ Frar 28)
- Chickens Square (Misraħ it-Tiġieġ)
- Carmelo Rizzo Square (Misraħ Karm Rizzo)
- Joseph Briffa Square (Pjazza Joseph Briffa)
- Railway Square (Pjazza tal-Ferrovija)
- St. Alyosius Square (Misraħ San Alwiġi)
- St. Frances Square (Pjazza San Franġisk)
- St. Helen Square (Pjazza Sant' Elena) - The main square of Birkirkara.

=== Swatar ===
- Hero Square (Pjazza l-Eroj) - The main square of Swatar, hamlet in Birkirkara.

== Birżebbuġa ==
- Carmelo Caruana Square (Wesgħa Carmelo Caruana)
- Church Square (Misraħ il-Knisja) - The main square of Birżebbuġa.
- Hamilkar Barka Square (Misraħ Ħamilkar Barka)
- Republic Square (Misraħ ir-Repubblika)
- Sacred Heart's Square (Misraħ tal-Qalb Imqaddsa)
- Summit Square (Misraħ is-Summit)
- Ta' Pajtier Square (Misraħ Ta' Pajtier)

=== Qajjenza ===
- Ramon Perellos Square - The main square of Qajjenza, not official hamlet in Birżebbuġa.

== Bormla ==
- Bonnici Square (Misraħ Bonnici)
- Church of Nativity Square (Wesgħa l-Knisja tan-Nattività)
- Cospicua Square (Misraħ Bormla)
- Gavino Gulia Square (Misraħ Gavino Gulia) - The main square of Bormla (Città Cospicua).
- Paolino Vassallo Square (Pjazza Paolino Vassallo)
- St. Margret Square (Misraħ Santa Margerita)
- St. Theresa Square (Pjazza Santa Tereża)

== Dingli ==
- Frances Abela Square (Misraħ Frenċ Abela) - The main square of Dingli.
- Ġużè Abela Square (Misraħ Ġużè Abela)
- Monument Square (Misraħ il-Mafkar)
- Psaigon Square (Wesgħa Psaigon)

== Fgura ==
- Bro. R. Gauci Square (Pjazza Patri Redent Gauci)
- Council of Europe Square (Wesgħet il-Kunsill tal-Ewropa)
- Joseph Gauci Square (Wesgħet Ġużeppi Gauci)
- Reggie Miller Square (Wesgħa Reggie Miller) - The main square of Fgura.

== Floriana, Malta ==
- E.S. Tonna Square (Pjazza Emanuel S. Tonna)
- Filippo Sceberras Square (Pjazza Filippo Sceberras)
- Graneries Square (Pjazza tal-Fosos) - This also known as the Small Graneries Square (Il-Fosos iż-Żgħar), to not confuse it with St. Publius Square.
- Pope John XXIII Square (Pjazza Papa Giovanni XXIII)
- Robert Samut Square (Pjazza Robert Samut)
- Sir Luigi Preziosi Square (Pjazza Sir Luigi Preziosi)
- St. Anne Square (Pjazza Sant' Anna)
- St. Calcidonio Square (Pjazza San Kalċidonju)
- St. Publius Square (Misraħ San Publju) - The main square of Floriana and the largest square in Malta. This square is also known as Fuq il-Fosos (The Graneries).

== Gudja ==
- Angelo Dalli Square (Wesgħet Anġlu Dalli)
- Church's Square (Pjazza tal-Knisja) - the main square of Gudja.

== Gżira ==
- De La Salle Square (Pjazza De La Salle)
- Memè Scicluna Square (Pjazza Memè Scicluna) - The main square of Gżira.
- Turo Colombo Square (Misraħ Turu Colombo)

== Għargħur ==
- Church Square (Misraħ il-Knisja) - The main and only square in Għargħur.

== Għaxaq ==
- Bir id-Deheb Square (Wesgħa Ta' Bir id-Deheb) - The main square of Bir id-Deheb, not official hamlet between Żejtun and Għaxaq.
- St. George Square (Misraħ San Ġorġ)
- St. Mary Square (Pjazza Santa Marija) - The main square of Għaxaq.
- St. Philip Square (Misraħ San Filippu)
- St. Roque Square (Misraħ Santu Rokku) - The largest square in Għaxaq.

== Ħamrun ==
- 7th June, 1919 Square (Misraħ is-Sebgħa ta' Ġunju, 1919)
- Hamrun Victims Square (Misraħ il-Vittmi Ħamruniżi)
- Parish Priest Muscat (Pjazza Kappillan Muscat) - The main square of Ħamrun's Immaculate Conception Parish.
- St. Paul Square (Pjazza San Pawl) - The main square of Ħamrun, it is also known as Fra Diego Square (Pjazza Fra Diegu).

== Iklin ==
- L.J.B. Scicluna Square (Wesgħa Lewis J.B. Scicluna)
- Cremona Square (Pjazza Ninu Cremona) - the main square of Iklin

== Kalkara ==
- Archbishop Gonzi Square (Misraħ l-Arċisqof Gonzi) - The main square of Kalkara.
- Holy Family Square (Pjazza Sagra Familja)

== Kirkop ==
- Kirkop Square (Misraħ Ħal Kirkop)
- St. Leonard Square (Misraħ San Anard) - The main square of Kirkop.
- Sunrise Square (Misraħ iż-Żerniq)

== Lija ==
- Transfiguration Square (Misraħ it-Trasfigurazzjoni) - The main and only square in Lija.

== Luqa ==
- Church Square (Misraħ tal-Knisja)
- Rev. Joe M. Camilleri Square (Wesgħet Dun Joe M. Camilleri)
- St. Andrews' Square (Misraħ Sant' Andrija) - The main square of Luqa.
- War Victims Square (Wesgħet il-Vittmi tal-Gwerra) - The largest square in Luqa.
- Youths Square (Misraħ iż-Żgħażagħ)

== Marsa, Malta ==
- Bro. Magri Square (Misraħ Patri Magri)
- G.F. Abela Square (Misraħ Giovanni F. Abela)

== Marsaskala ==
- Lorry Sant Square (Pjazza Lorry Sant)
- Mifsud Bonnici Square (Misraħ Mifsud Bonnici) - the main playground and park of Marsaskala
- Rev. Tarcisio Agius Square (Pjazza Dun Tarċis Agius) - the main square of Marsaskala

== Marsaxlokk ==
- Our Lady of Pompeii Square (Pjazza l-Madonna ta' Pompej) - the main square of Marsaxlokk
- Rev. Joseph Caruana Square (Wesgħa Dun Ġużepp Caruana)

== Mdina ==
- Bastion's Square (Pjazza tas-Sur)
- Blessed Maria Adeodata Pisani Square (Pjazzetta Beata Marija Adeodata Pisani)
- Council Square (Misraħ il-Kunsill)
- Greek's Gate Square (Misraħ tal-Mina tal-Griegi)
- Mesquita Square (Misraħ Mesquita)
- St. Agatha's Square (Wesgħa ta' Sant' Agata)
- St. Paul's Square (Misraħ San Pawl) - the main square of Mdina.
- St. Publius Square (Misraħ San Publju)

== Mellieħa ==
- Cross Square (Misraħ Tas-Salib) - The main square of Tas-Salib area.
- Narcis Square (Wesgħat in-Narċis)
- Parish Square (Misraħ il-Parroċċa) - The main square of Mellieħa.
- Pope Visit Square (Misraħ iż-Żjara tal-Papa)
- Thomas Spratt Square (Pjazza Thomas Spratt)

=== Manikata ===
- Bay Square - The main square of Għajn Tuffieħa area, part of the non official hamlet of Manikata.

== Mġarr ==
- Jubilee Square (Wesgħat il-Ġublew) - The main square of Mgarr.

== Mosta ==
- 16th September Square (Pjazza s-Sittax ta' Settembru)
- Brittany Square (Misraħ Brittanja)
- Flower Square (Wesgħet il-Plejju)
- Għonoq Square (Misraħ il-Għonoq)
- Marco Montebello Square (Wesgħet Marco Montebello)
- Rotunda Square (Pjazza tar-Rotunda) - The main square of Mosta.
- St. Leonard Square (Pjazza San Leonardu)

== Mqabba ==
- Church's Square (Pjazza tal-Knisja)
- Diamond Jubilee Square (Pjazza tal-Ġublew tad-Djamanti)
- Fidwa Square (Misraħ il-Fidwa)
- Little Mission Square (Misraħ il-Missjoni ż-Żgħira)

== Msida ==
- G. Debono Square (Misraħ G. Debono)
- G. Ellul Mercer Square (Misraħ Ġużè Ellul Mercer)
- Menqa Square (Misraħ il-Menqa) - the main square of Msida.
- St. Joseph Square (Misraħ San Ġużepp)

== Mtarfa ==
- Frezia Square (Wesgħat il-Freżja)
- Sunflower Square (Misraħ il-Warda tax-Xemx)
- Water Supplies Square (Wesgħat il-Ħażniet tal-Ilma)

== Naxxar ==
- Chelsea Square (Pjazza Ċelsi)
- Darnino Square (Pjazza Darnino)
- St. Paul Square (Misraħ San Pawl)
- Toni Bajjada Square (Pjazza Toni Bajjada)
- Victory Square (Pjazza Vittorja) - The main square of Naxxar.

== Paola ==
- Grand Master Antoine De Paule Square (Pjazza Antoine De Paule) - Paola's Main Square
- Saint Ubaldesca Square (Pjazza Santa Ubaldeska)
- St. Anthony's Square (Pjazza Sant' Antnin) - the main square of the hamlet of Għajn Dwieli

== Pembroke, Malta ==
- Fort Pembroke Square (Misraħ il-Forti Pembroke)
- Shelter Square (Wesgħat ix-Xelter)

== Pieta, Malta ==
- Our Lady of Fatima Square (Pjazza Madonna ta' Fatima)
- Mgr. Isidoro Formosa Square (Pjazza Mons. Isidoro Formosa) - a square in Guardamangia
- St. Lukes' Square (Pjazza San Luqa) - the main bus terminus of St. Luke's Hospital

== Rabat, Malta ==
- Forok Square (Misraħ il-Forok)
- L'Isle Adam Square (Pjazza L'Isle Adam)
- Museum Square (Wesgħa Tal-Mużew) - The largest square in Rabat.
- Parish Square (Misraħ il-Parroċċa) - The main square of Rabat.
- Saqqajja Square (Pjazza tas-Saqqajja)
- St. Domenic Square (Misraħ San Duminku)

=== Baħrija ===
- Bro. Martin Caruana Square (Misraħ Patri Martin Caruana, O.P.) - The main and only square of Baħrija, an official hamlet of Rabat.

== Qormi ==
- 15th March Square (Misraħ il-15 ta' Marzu)
- Authors Square (Misraħ il-Kittieba)
- Federico Maempel Square (Pjazza Federico Maempel)
- Garden Square (Pjazza tal-Ġnien)
- Grand Master Square (Pjazza tal-Gran Mastru)
- Ġużè Flores Square (Misraħ Ġużè Flores)
- Maltese Folk Music Square (Misraħ l-Għana)
- Mgr. P.P. Psaila Square (Pjazza Mons. P.P. Psaila)
- Narbona Square (Pjazza Narbona)
- Olives Square (Misraħ iż-Żebbuġ)
- St. Frances Square (Pjazza San Franġisk)
- St. Mary's Square (Pjazza Santa Marija)

== Qrendi ==
- Maqluba Square (Misraħ tal-Maqluba)
- Sanctuary of Our Lady of Mercy Square (Misrah is-Santwarju tal-Madonna tal-Hniena) - The main square of Tal-Hniena area.
- St. Mary Square (Misraħ Santa Marija)
- St. Matthew Square (Misraħ San Mattew) - The main square of Maqluba area.
- Parish Square (Pjazza Parrokjali) - The main square of Qrendi.

== Safi, Malta ==
- Church Square (Misraħ il-Knisja) - The main square of Safi.
- St. Joseph Square (Misraħ San Ġużepp)
- St. Matthew Square (Misraħ San Mattew)

== San Ġiljan ==
- Agostino Savelli Square (Wesgħa Agostino Savelli)
- Balluta Square (Pjazza Balluta) - The main square of Balluta Bay.
- Tanti Square (Wesgħat Ġużè Tanti)

== San Ġwann ==
- Awrekarja Square (Misraħ Awrekarja)
- Centwarja Square (Misraħ Ċentwarja)
- Almond's Square (Misraħ Lewża)
- Lourdes Square (Misraħ Lourdes)
- V. Borg Square (Pjazza Vincenzo Borg - Brared)

== San Pawl il-Baħar ==
- Bay Square (Misraħ il-Bajja) - The main square of Bugibba.
- Sheltered Square (Wesgħa l-Kennija) - Qawra

== Santa Luċija ==
- 7th July, 1961 Square (Pjazza 7 ta' Lulju, 1961)
- Dorell Square (Misraħ Dorell) - The main square of Santa Luċija

== Santa Venera ==
- St. Venera Square (Misraħ Santa Venera)

== Senglea (L-Isla) ==
- 4th September Square (Misraħ l-Erbgħa ta' Settembru)
- Andrea Debono Square (Misraħ Andrea Debono)
- Dom Mauro Inguanez Square (Misraħ Dom Mawru Inguanez)
- Francesco Zahra Square (Pjazza Francesco Zahra)
- George Mitrovich Square (Misraħ Ġorġ Mitrovich)
- Pope Benedict XV Square (Misraħ il-Papa Benedittu XV)- the main square of Senglea

== Siġġiewi ==
- Città Ferdinand Square (Pjazza Città Ferdinand)
- Palace Square (Wesgħet il-Palazz)
- St. John Square (Pjazza San Ġwann)
- St. Nicholas Square (Pjazza San Nikola) - The main square of Siġġiewi.
- War Victims Square (Misraħ il-Vittmi tal-Gwerra)

== Sliema ==
- Annunciation Square (Pjazza tal-Lunzjata)
- Dingli Circle (Pjazza Sir Adrian Dingli)
- St. Anne's Square (Pjazza Sant' Anna) - the main square of Sliema.

== Tarxien ==
- Agatha Barbara Square (Pjazza Agatha Barbara)
- Buleben Square (Misraħ Buleben)
- Market Square (Misraħ tas-Suq)
- Republic Square (Misraħ ir-Repubblika) - The main square of Tarxien.

== Valletta ==
- Castile Place (Misraħ Kastilja)
- Freedom Square (Misraħ il-Ħelsien) - The square was decreased in footprint and part of it is now occupied by the Parliament House of Malta
- Independence Square (Misraħ Indipendenza)
- Mattia Preti Square (Misraħ Mattia Preti) - The main square of Marsamxett area.
- Republic Square (Misraħ ir-Repubblika) - This square is known also as Queen's Square (Pjazza Reġina)
- St. Elmo Place (Misraħ Sant' Iermu)
- St. George's Square (Misraħ San Ġorġ) - The main square of Valletta, it is also known as Palace Square (Misraħ il-Palazz)
- St. John's Square (Misraħ San Ġwann)
- Victory Square (Misraħ il-Vittorja)

== Xgħajra ==
- Freedom Square (Wesgħet il-Ħelsien) - The only square in Xgħajra.

== Żabbar ==
- Our Lady Mediatrice Square (Misraħ il-Madonna Medjatriċi) - The main square of Żabbar.
- Maltese Heros Square (Misraħ il-Qalbiena Maltin) - The main square of Buleben iż-Żgħir, not official hamlet in Żabbar.
- Peace Square (Misraħ is-Sliem)
- St. James Square (Misraħ San Ġakbu)
- St. Nicholas Square (Misraħ San Nikola)
- Wignacourt Square (Misraħ Alofju Wignacourt)

== Żebbuġ, Malta ==
- Hal Dwieli Square (Misraħ Ħal-Dwieli)
- Hospital Square (Misraħ l-Isptar)
- Muxi Square (Misraħ Muxi) - The main square of Ħal Muxi, not official hamlet in Żebbuġ.
- St. Philip Square (Misraħ San Filippu) - The main square of Żebbuġ.

== Żejtun ==
- 5th October, 1974 Square (Wesgħat l-5 ta' Ottubru, 1974)
- 13th December Square (Misraħ Diċembru Tlettax)
- Animals' Spring Square (Wesgħat l-Għajn tal-Bhejjem)
- Bandolier Square (Misraħ il-Bandolier)
- Canon Giovanni Vella (Misraħ il-Kanonku Giovanni Vella)
- Carlo Diacono Square (Misraħ Karlu Diacono)
- Carmelo Grima (Misraħ Karmnu Grima)
- Engineers Square (Wesgħat l-Inġiniera)
- George Busuttil Square (Misraħ Ġorġ Busuttil)
- Giuseppe Pulis Montebello Square (Wesgħat Giuseppe Pulis Montebello)
- Gregorio Bonici Square (Misraħ Girgor Bonici)
- Independence Square (Misraħ l-Indipendenza)
- M.A. Vassalli Square (Misraħ Mikiel Anton Vassalli)
- Republic Square (Misraħ ir-Repubblika)
- St. Mary's Square (Misraħ Santa Marija)
- Ta' Pizzuta Square (Misraħ Ta' Pizzuta)
- Wells' Square (Misraħ il-Bjar)

== Żurrieq ==
- Carmelites Square (Misraħ il-Karmelitani)
- Francesco Bugeja Square (Wesgħa Franġisk Bugeja)
- Joseph M. Cassar Square (Wesgħat Joseph M. Cassar)
- Mattia Preti Square (Misraħ Mattia Preti)
- Republic Square (Misraħ ir-Repubblika)
- St. Lazzarus Square (Misraħ San Lażżru)

=== Bubaqra ===
- St. Mary Square (Misraħ Santa Marija)

== Gozo ==
=== Fontana, Malta ===
- Springs Square (Misraħ l-Għejjun) - The main and only square in Fontana, it is also known as Fontana Square.

=== Għajnsielem ===
- 10th December Square (Pjazzetta Għaxra ta' Diċembru)
- Appiration Square (Pjazza tad-Dehra)
- Independence Square (Għajnsielem) (Pjazza Indipendenza)
- Our Lady of Loreto Square (Pjazza Madonna ta' Loreto)
- Tolfa Square (Pjazza Tolfa)

=== Għarb ===
- Gerano Square (Pjazza Gerano)
- Prague Square (Pjazza Praga)
- Visitation of Our Lady Square (Pjazza taż-Żjara tal-Madonna)

=== Għasri ===
- Rev. Joseph Buttigieg Square (Wesgħa Dun Ġużepp Buttigieg)
- Our Saviour Square (Pjazza s-Salvatur)

=== Kerċem ===
- Orvieto Square (Pjazza Orvieto)
- Salvatore Busuttil Square (Pjazza Salvatore Busuttil)
- St. Gregory Square (Pjazza San Girgor)
- St. Lucia Square (Pjazza Santa Luċija) - The main square of the hamlet of Santa Luċija, Gozo.

=== Munxar ===
- Anfori Square (Pjazza l-Anfori) - The main square of Xlendi, an official hamlet of Munxar.
- Church Square (Pjazza tal-Knisja) - The main square of Munxar.

=== Nadur ===
- 28th April, 1688 Square (Pjazza t-Tmienja u Għoxrin ta' April, 1688)
- Archpriest Martin Camilleri Square (Pjazza l-Arċipriet Martin Camilleri)
- St. Peter and St. Paul Square (Pjazza San Pietru u San Pawl) - The main square of Nadur.

=== Qala ===
- Bishop Michael Buttigieg Square (Pjazza l-Isqof Mikiel Buttigieg)
- Republic Square (Pjazza Repubblika)
- San Kerrew Square (Pjazza San Kerrew)
- St. Joseph Square (Pjazza San Ġużepp) - The main square of Qala.

=== San Lawrenz ===
- Dwejra Square (Pjazza tad-Dwejra) - The main square of Dwejra.
- St. Lawrence Square (Pjazza San Lawrenz) - The main square of San Lawrenz.

=== Sannat ===
- St. Margareth Square (Pjazza Santa Margarita)

=== Victoria, Malta ===
- Bro. A. Xerri Square (Pjazzetta Patri Akkursju Xerri)
- Cathedral Square (Pjazza Katidral) - The main square of the Citadella (Gozo) fortification city in Victoria.
- Gozo Siege Square (Pjazza l-Assedju ta' Għawdex)
- Independence Square (Pjazza l-Indipendenza) - The main square of Victoria, it is also known as It-Tokk.
- President J.F. Kennedy Square (Pjazza President J.F. Kennedy)
- San Ġorġ tal-Ħaġar Square (Pjazza San Ġorġ tal-Ħaġar)
- Savina Square (Pjazza Savina)
- St. Augustine Square (Pjazza Santu Wistin)
- St. Frances Square (Pjazza San Franġisk)
- St. George Square (Pjazza San Ġorġ)
- Tomba Square (Pjazzetta Fuq it-Tomba)

=== Xagħra ===
- St. Anton Square (Pjazza Sant' Anton)
- Victory Square (Pjazza Vittorja) - The main square of Xagħra.

=== Xewkija ===
- St. John the Baptist Square (Pjazza San Ġwann Battista) - The main square of Xewkija.
- Tal-Barmil Square (Pjazza Tal-Barmil)

=== Żebbuġ, Gozo ===
- Assumption Square (Pjazza l-Assunta) - The main square of Żebbuġ, Gozo.
- Church Square (Misraħ il-Knisja) - The main square of Marsalforn, an official hamlet of Żebbuġ, Gozo.
- M. Refalo Square (Pjazza Mikelanġelo Refalo) - A square in Marsalforn.
- St. Mary of Virtues Square (Pjazza Santa Marija tal-Virtù)
- St. Paul Square (Pjazza San Pawl) - A square in Marsalforn.

== Comino ==
- Liberty Square (Pjazza Libertà)
