= Platz der Republik =

Platz der Republik may refer to:

- Platz der Republik (Berlin)
- Platz der Republik (Hamburg)
