= Republican Block =

- U.S. National Register of Historic Places
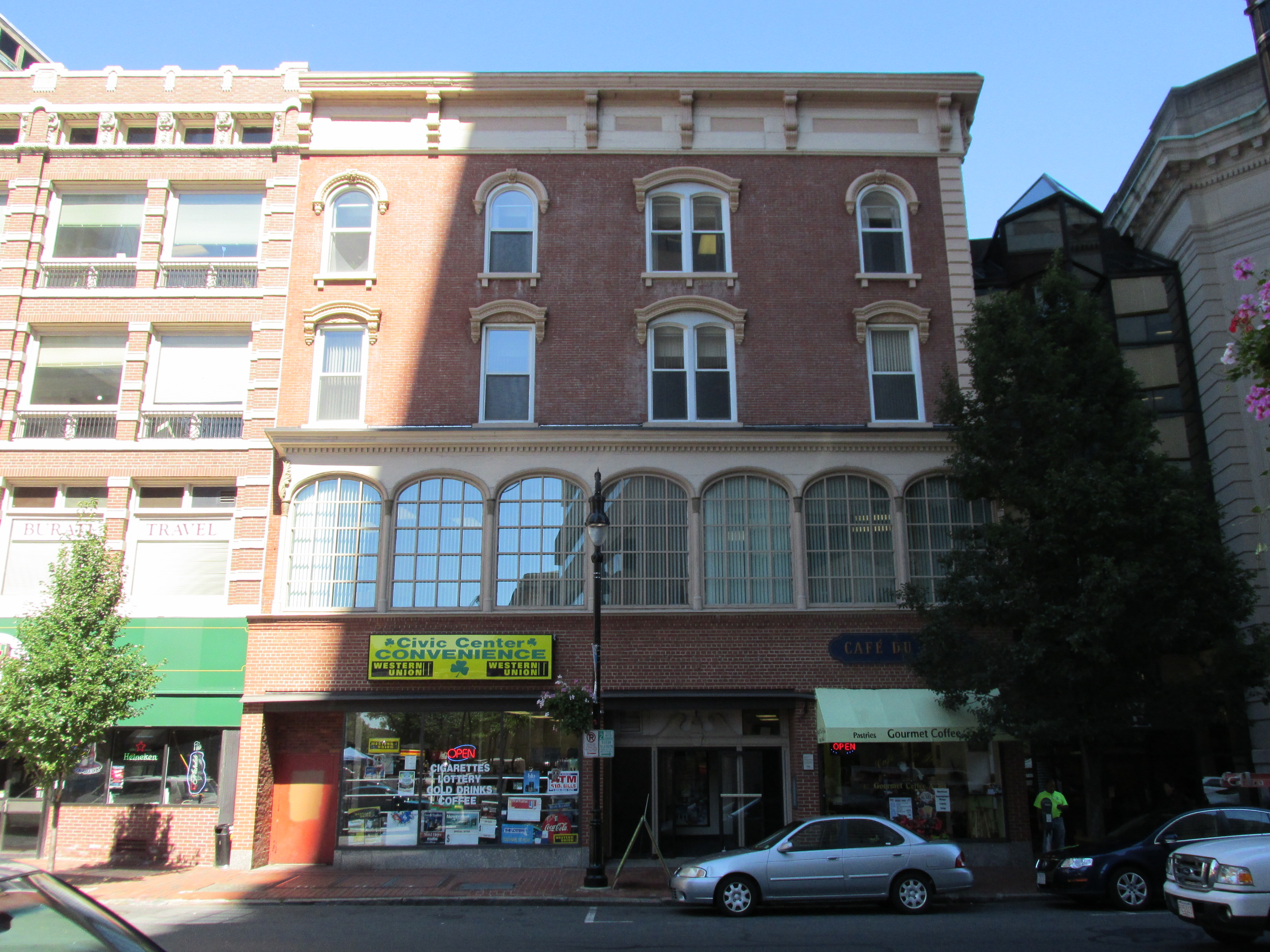
- Republican Block

- Location within Massachusetts Location within the United States
- Location: 1365 Main St., Springfield, Massachusetts
- Coordinates: 42°6′8″N 72°35′25″W
- Area: less than one acre
- Built: 1858
- Architect: Chapin, A.L.
- Architectural style: Italianate
- NRHP reference No.: 78000447
- Added to NRHP: January 26, 1978

The Republican Block is a historic commercial building at 1365 Main Street in downtown Springfield, Massachusetts. Built in 1858, it heralded the northward expansion of the downtown north of Court Square, and was the first permanent home of the Springfield Republican, one of the state's oldest newspapers. It was listed on the National Register of Historic Places in 1978.

== Description and history ==
The Republican Block is located in downtown Springfield, on the east side of Main Street just north of Court Square, one of the city's oldest public spaces. It is a four-story brick building with Italianate styling. Its ground floor is occupied by two storefronts, set on either side of a central building entrance. The second floor has a band of arched windows topped by a dentillated cornice. The third and fourth floors have windows set singly and in pairs under bracketed segmented arches or rounded arches. The building is crowned by a bracketed projecting cornice.

The block was built in 1858 for The Republican, a newspaper founded in 1824. The Republican occupied the premises until 1867, and is the only surviving reminder of the period of ownership by its founder, Samuel Bowles. It was then bought by D. H. Brigham, a clothing retailer. Brigham greatly expanded the premises to the rear, and operated a clothing factory and shop in the building, which remained in business until 1969. The building is believed to have been designed by A. L. Chapin, a prominent local architect who designed a significant number of Springfield's Main Street buildings of the period.

== See also ==
- Union Trust Company Building (Springfield, Massachusetts), 1351 Main Street
- Court Square Historic District (Springfield, Massachusetts), across Main Street
- National Register of Historic Places listings in Springfield, Massachusetts
- National Register of Historic Places listings in Hampden County, Massachusetts
