= Independence Square (Podgorica) =

Square in Podgorica, Montenegro

Coordinates: 42.441262°N 19.262804°E

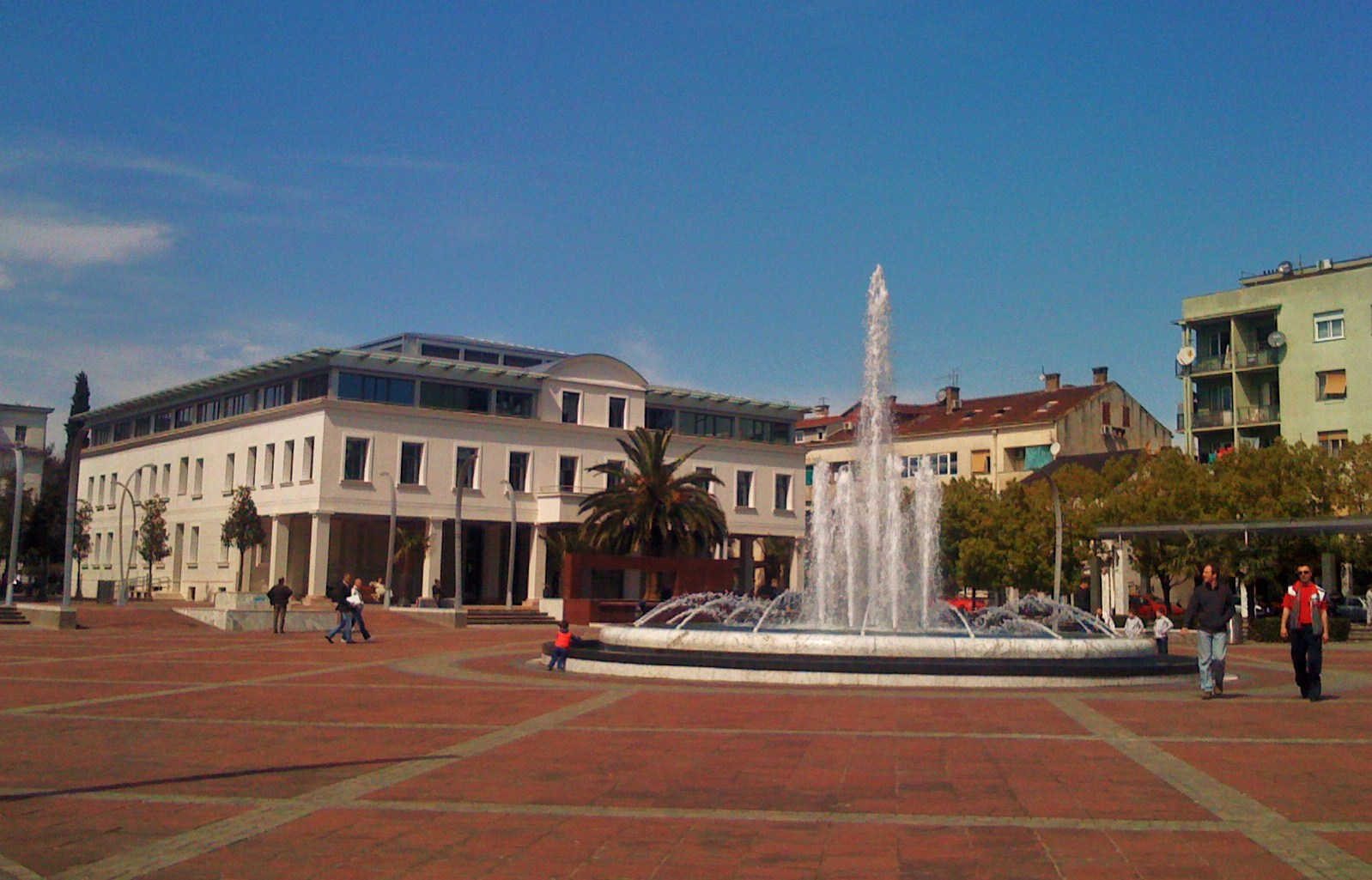
The Independence Square with the city library in the background

Independence Square (Note: Formerly known as Republic Square or Square of the Republic (Montenegrin: Трг Републике, Trg Republike)) is the central town square of Podgorica, Montenegro. It is located in Nova Varoš (Montenegrin Cyrillic: Нова Варош, lit. 'New Town'), which is the administrative and socio-cultural heart of the city. The square covers an area of 5,000 square metres. Both the city library "Radosav Ljumović", and the state gallery "Art", are located in the square.

== Location ==
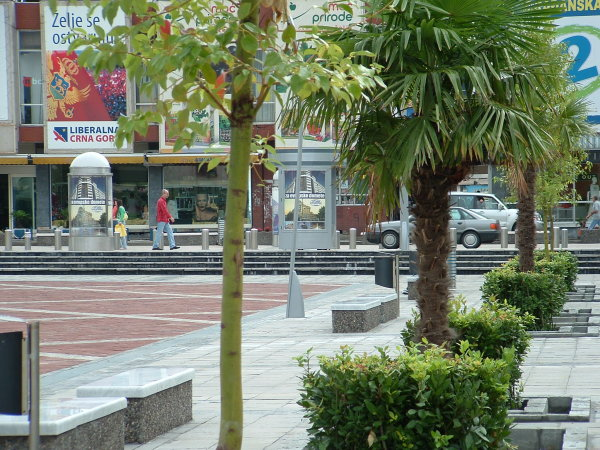
A view towards Ulica Slobode

The square is bordered by Ulica Slobode (Freedom street) to the east, and Njegoševa Ulica (Njegoš's Street) to the west. Both Njegoševa and Slobode streets are newly renovated pedestrian zones - with Ulica Slobode also being a popular shopping street. Bokeška and Vučedolska Street create the square's northern and southern borders, respectively. A pedestrian passage connects the Republic Square to Podgorica's City Hall and the Montenegrin National Theatre building.

== History ==
Trg Republike was until 2006 known as Trg Ivana Milutinovića (Ivan Milutinović Square) – a famous Montenegrin communist politician, military general and national hero. In 2006, the year of the Montenegrin independence, the square underwent a massive reconstruction. It was widened, paved, a big central fountain was constructed and the area was turned into a car-free zone. The square was decorated with colonnades, palm trees and water channels. The whole project cost around 2.5 million Euros.

== Gallery ==
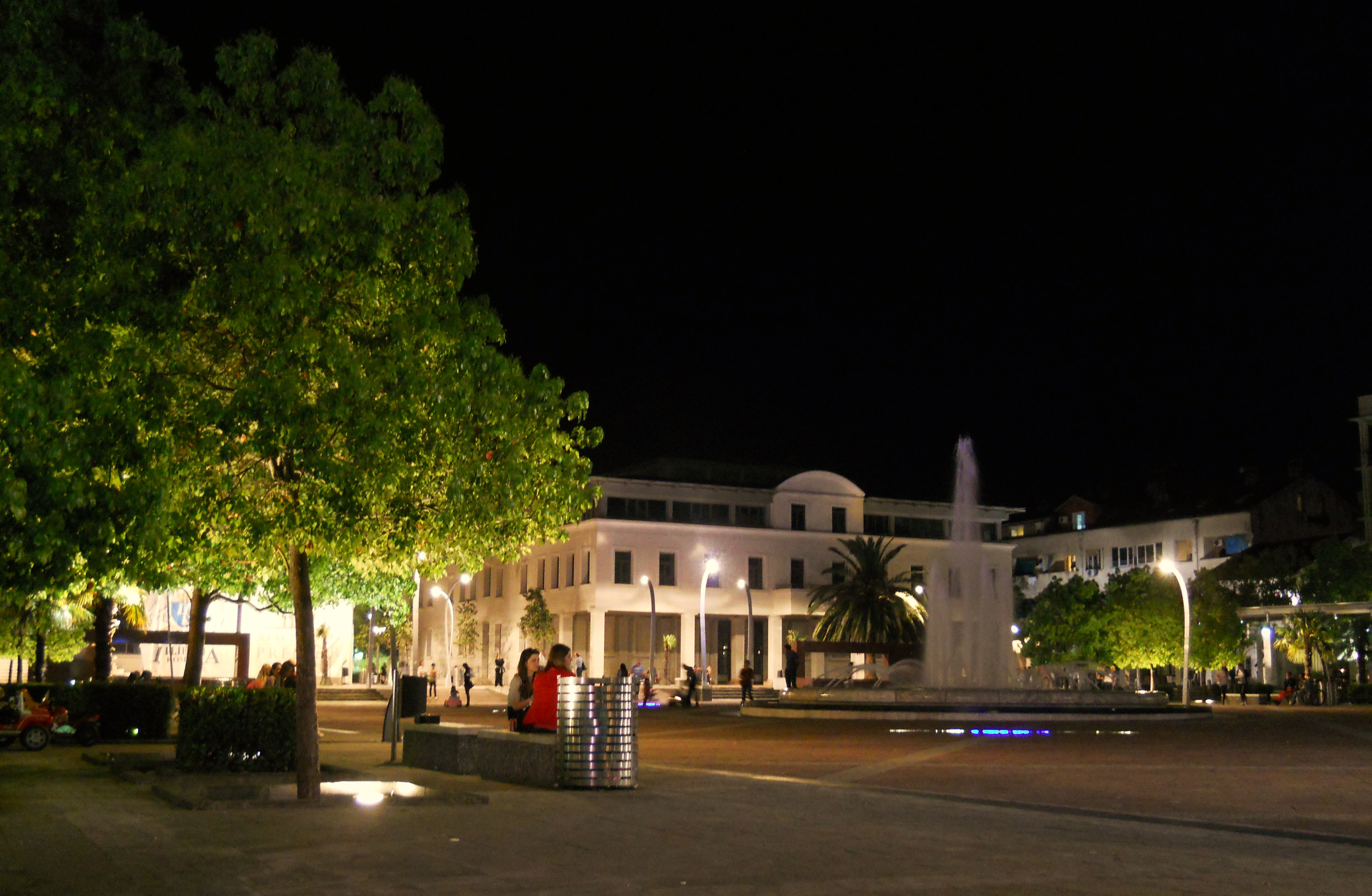
The square at night

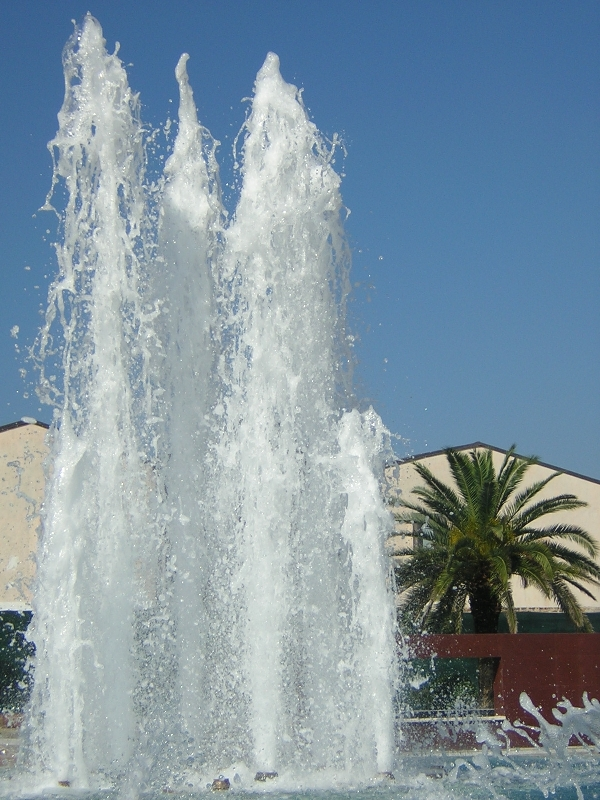
The fountain

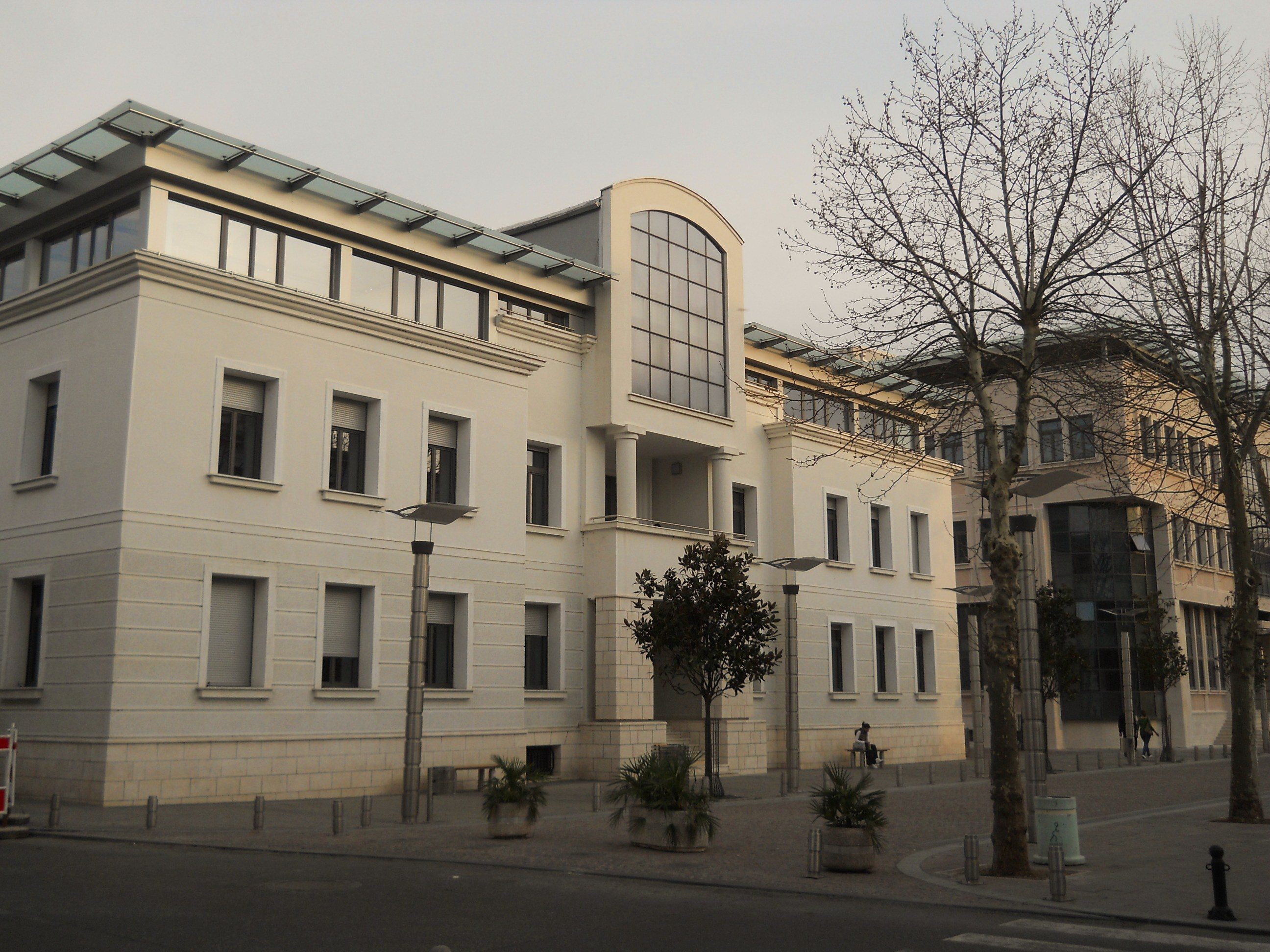
The public library - rear view
