= Platz der Republik (Hamburg) =

City square and park in Altona, Hamburg, Germany

Coordinates: 53.5485°N 9.9354°E

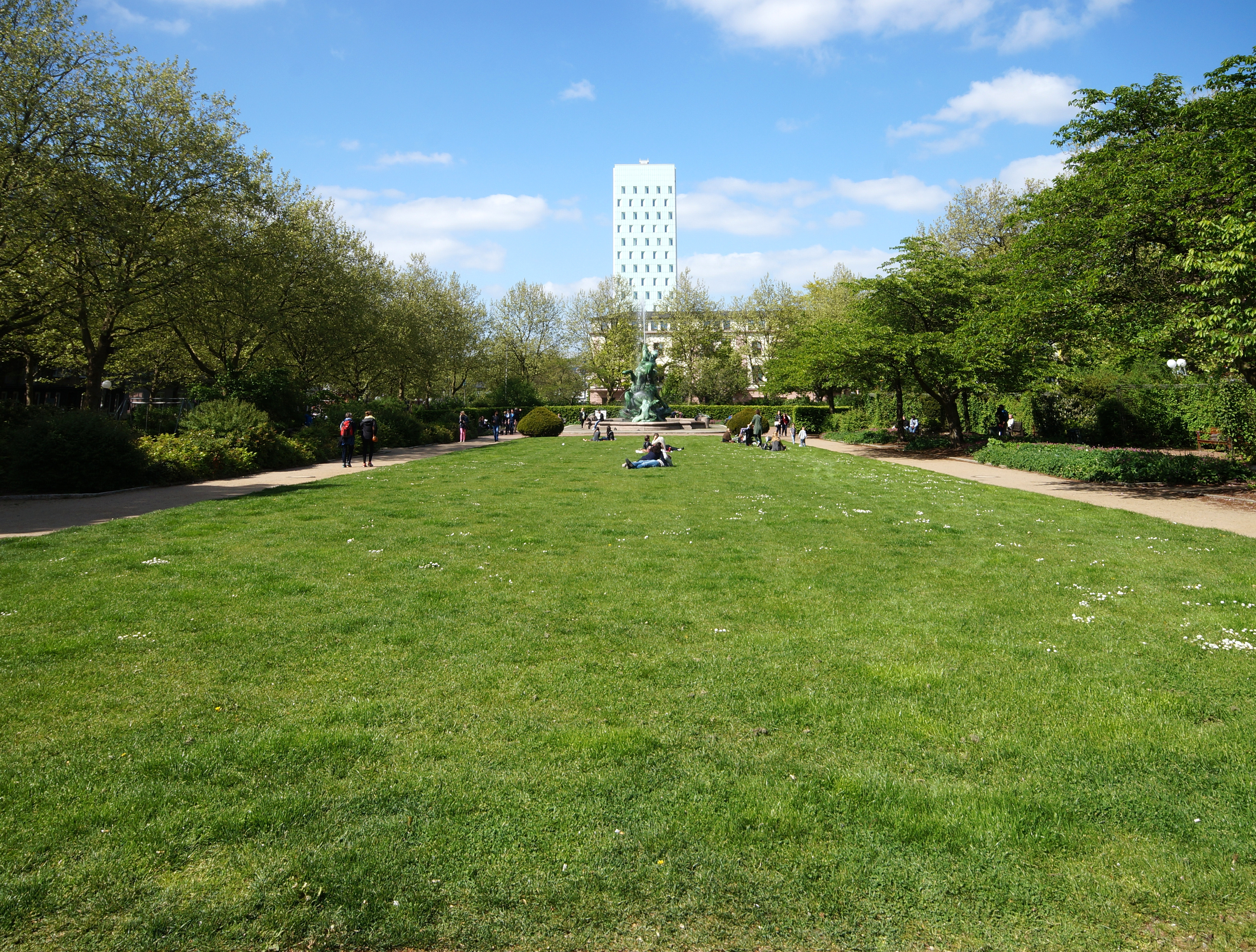
Platz der Republik

Platz der Republik (German: [ˈplats deːɐ̯ ʁepuˈbliːk], Republic Square) is a city square in Altona, Hamburg, Germany. In the center of the square, the fountain of Stuhlmannbrunnen is located.
