= Piazza della Repubblica =

Piazza della Repubblica may refer to:

- Piazza della Repubblica (Alcamo)
- Piazza della Repubblica, Rome
- Piazza della Repubblica, Florence
