= Marko Ćetković =

Montenegrin footballer

Personal information
- Full name: Marko Ćetković
- Date of birth: 10 July 1986 (age 40)
- Place of birth: Titograd, SFR Yugoslavia
- Height: 1.70 m (5 ft 7 in)
- Position: Midfielder

Youth career
- 2002–2003: Crvena Stijena

Senior career*
Years	Team	Apps	(Gls)
2003–2005	Mladost Podgorica	31	(0)
2006–2007	Zeta	46	(11)
2007–2008	Partizan	10	(0)
2008–2011	Mogren	85	(22)
2011–2013	Jagiellonia	19	(0)
2012	→ Buriram United (loan)	11	(1)
2013	→ Podbeskidzie (loan)	9	(0)
2013–2014	Budućnost Podgorica	28	(6)
2014–2016	Laçi	45	(11)
2016	Sarajevo	10	(1)
2017	Partizani Tirana	16	(1)
2017–2018	Mladost Podgorica	33	(8)
2018–2021	Sutjeska	91	(18)
2021–2025	Mornar	129	(16)

International career^{‡}
2003	Serbia and Montenegro U17	3	(1)
2007–2008	Montenegro U21	9	(0)
2010–2013	Montenegro	6	(1)
- * Club domestic league appearances and goals as of 1 June 2025 ‡ National team caps and goals as of 23 November 2013

Marko Ćetković (Cyrillic; Марко Ћeткoвић; born 10 July 1986) is a Montenegrin retired footballer. He has played for the Montenegro national team.

== Club career ==
=== Youth ===
Ćetković began his career with Crvena Stijena and Mladost Podgorica. When he left Mladost, he played in the Montenegrin Second League, at the time one of two third-tier leagues in Serbia and Montenegro's football pyramid.

=== Zeta ===
Ćetković made his top-flight debut with Zeta in the 2006-07 season, the first season after Montenegro split from Serbia. After Zeta won the league, he left a strong impression in the qualifying rounds of the Champions League that season. He scored a goal against FBK Kaunas, after which he played both legs against Rangers. Although Zeta was eliminated, the Rangers' website published a post-match report recognizing Ćetković as "by far and away the stand out player" of his team.

=== Partizan ===
On 31 August 2007, Ćetković signed a four-year contract with Serbian team Partizan. On 5 December 2007, he played in the final of the Trofeo Santiago Bernabéu in a 2–0 loss against Real Madrid, coming on as a substitute for Zoran Tošić in the 58th minute.

Initially, Ćetković saw more playing time under coach Miroslav Đukić, but fell out of favor with the subsequent coach, Slaviša Jokanović. After leaving Partizan in July 2008, he told a journalist that the move to Partizan was a mistake in his career.

=== Mogren ===
In August 2008, Ćetković signed for Mogren. At the time of Ćetković's transfer, Mogren was coached by Dejan Vukićević and had a respected generation of players from the Montenegro national team involving the likes of Radoslav Batak, Ivan Janjušević, Petar Grbić, Janko Simović, and Draško Božović. Ćetković played regularly for Mogren when they won the Montenegrin First League in 2009, and also scored the winning goal against Budućnost, the previous season's champion.

=== Jagiellonia ===
In July 2011, he joined Polish team Jagiellonia Białystok on a three-year contract. He spent two half-seasons out on loan; first in Thailand with Buriram United F.C. and then with Podbeskidzie Bielsko-Biała. Overall, Ćetković played a total of 19 league games for Jagiellonia.

=== Budućnost ===
After spending two seasons in Poland, Ćetković returned to his homeland and signed for Budućnost in July 2013. He started his 2013–14 season by scoring 6 goals in 27 games for Budućnost. At the end of the 2014 season, Ćetković was recognized as one of the three best midfielders of Montenegrin First League that season by the Trade Union of Professional Football Players of Montenegro.

=== Laçi ===
On 16 August 2014, Ćetković officially signed with Albanian Superliga side Laçi on a one-year deal, taking the vacant number 20 for the upcoming 2014–15 season. It was also reported that the team's goalkeeper Miroslav Vujadinović had his part on Ćetković's transfer, convincing the player to join the team.

He made his official debut with the club on 24 August in team's opening league match of the season against Partizani Tirana at home, coming on as a second-half substitute. Ćetković scored his first goal of the season in the matchday 5 against Tirana, netting the opening goal of the 2–0 home win, and was selected Man of the Match. Two week later, Ćetković was again in the scoresheet where he converted a penalty-kick to help Laçi conquer Vllaznia Shkodër 3–0 at home.

On 21 July 2015, during the preparations for the new season, Ćetković underwent surgery in his right ankle in a hospital in Zagreb that kept him out until November 2015. The constant pain in his leg had concerned him for months, and the surgery was unavoidable. Due to the surgery, Ćetković missed the European campaign and the start of the season.

After an impressive first season in Albanian football he was subject to interest and formal offers from Skënderbeu Korçë, Kukësi, Partizani Tirana and Tirana, but he extended his contract with KF Laçi for another year.

In April 2016, Ćetković scored his team's both goals in the 2015–16 Albanian Cup semi-final tie against Skënderbeu Korçë, as Laçi progressed to the final thanks to the away goal rule. However, in the final, Laçi was defeated 5–3 on penalties after the regular and extra time finished in a 1–1; Ćetković himself scored his team's second penalty shootout attempt. He left the team in June.

=== Sarajevo ===
On 14 June 2016, Ćetković signed with Sarajevo from Bosnia and Herzegovina. On 6 August 2016 he scored a goal in a 1–1 tie against Čelik Zenica. On 10 January 2017, it was announced that he terminated his contract with Sarajevo.

=== Partizani Tirana ===
On 12 January 2017, Ćetković returned in Albanian Superliga by signing a six-month contract with Partizani Tirana, taking squad number 21 for the second part of 2016–17 season.

He made his first appearance for the club came on 28 January in the matchday 19, starting in a 2–0 defeat at Luftëtari Gjirokastër. His first and only goal of the season would come on penultimate week of the season where Partizani defeated Korabi Peshkopi 3–0. He played 16 league matches until the end of the season as Partizani were runner-up in the Albanian Superliga, losing the championship to Kukësi for only three points.

On 12 June 2017, Ćetković left Partizani after deciding not to extend his contract, returning in Montenegro after 10 years.

=== Return to Mladost Podgorica ===
Only one day later, Ćetković returned to his birth country to sign with Mladost Podgorica, returning to the club after 12 years.

=== Sutjeska Nikšić ===
On 13 June 2018 Ćetković signed a one-year contract with Sutjeska Nikšić. At the end of the 2018-19 season, he was nominated as one of the three best midfielders in the league by the Trade Union of Professional Football Players of Montenegro.

=== Mornar Bar ===
On 12 June 2021 Cetkovic signed a contract with Mornar, new club in Montenegro first football league.

== International career ==
=== Youth ===
Ćetković's first international appearance was for Serbia and Montenegro U17; he debuted on 24 March 2003 against Finland for the second qualifying round of the 2004 UEFA European Under-17 Championship, which finished in a 1–1 draw. Following that, Ćetković made another two appearances, scoring once in the process. Ćetković continued to play for Montenegro U21, making nine appearances from when Montenegro declared independence from Serbia.

=== Senior ===
On 17 November 2010, Ćetković made his debut with the senior side during the friendly match against Azerbaijan, appearing in the last 15 minutes of the 2–0 home win.

He made his competitive debut for Montenegro on 11 October 2011 in the UEFA Euro 2012 qualifying match against Switzerland, playing full-90 minutes in a 2–0 away loss.

Ćetković was called up again in the senior side by its new coach Branko Brnović for the UEFA Euro 2012 qualifying play-off tie against Czech Republic. In the first leg at Generali Arena on 11 November 2011, Ćetković was even in the bench with the match finishing in a 2–0 loss for Ćetković's side. In the returning leg four days later, he was on the bench but still unable to make his debut with Montenegro who was defeated 1–0 at home and was kicked out with the aggregate 3–0.

On 17 November 2013, he scored his first goal for the Montenegro national team in a friendly against Luxembourg.

== Personal life ==
His brother Đorđije is also a Montenegro international who has been capped 7 times by the national team, and his uncle is former Yugoslavia international footballer Predrag Mijatović. He once stated that he loved basketball and that he would have loved to play basketball if he were taller.

== Career statistics ==
=== Club ===
As of 13 January 2021

Club	Season	League			Cup		Continental		Total	
Club	Season	Division	Apps	Goals	Apps	Goals	Apps	Goals	Apps	Goals
Mladost Podgorica	2003–04	Second League of Serbia and Montenegro	11	0			—		11	0
Mladost Podgorica	2004–05	Second League of Serbia and Montenegro	20	0	—		—		20	0
Mladost Podgorica	2005–06	Montenegrin Republic League					—			
Mladost Podgorica	Total		31	0	0	0	—		31	0
Zeta	2005–06	First League of Serbia and Montenegro	10	0	0	0	—		10	0
Zeta	2006–07	Montenegrin First League	29	8	0	0	—		29	8
Zeta	2007–08	Montenegrin First League	3	0	0	0	4 (Note: All appearance(s) in UEFA Intertoto Cup)	1	7	1
Zeta	Total		42	8	0	0	4	1	46	9
Partizan	2007–08	Serbian SuperLiga	10	0	0	0	—		10	0
Mogren	2008–09	Montenegrin First League	28	7	0	0	—		28	7
Mogren	2009–10	Montenegrin First League	29	3	0	0	4 (Note: All appearance(s) in UEFA Champions League)	2	33	5
Mogren	2010–11	Montenegrin First League	29	8	3	2	4 (Note: All appearance(s) in UEFA Europa League)	1	36	11
Mogren	Total		84	18	3	2	8	3	97	23
Jagiellonia Białystok	2011–12	Ekstraklasa	19	0	1	0	—		20	0
Buriram United	2012	Thai Premier League	11	1	0	0	—		11	1
Podbeskidzie	2012–13	Ekstraklasa	9	0	0	0	—		9	0
Budućnost Podgorica	2013–14	Montenegrin First League	28	6	0	0	—		28	6
Budućnost Podgorica	2014–15	Montenegrin First League	—		—		2	0	2	0
Budućnost Podgorica	Total		28	6	0	0	2	0	30	6
Laçi	2014–15	Kategoria Superiore	29	8	6	2	—		35	10
Laçi	2015–16	Kategoria Superiore	16	3	5	1	0	0	21	5
Laçi	Total		45	11	11	4	0	0	56	15
Sarajevo	2016–17	Premijer Liga	10	1	1	0	—		11	1
Partizani Tirana	2016–17	Kategoria Superiore	16	1	—		—		16	1
Mladost Podgorica	2017–18	Montenegrin First League	33	8	5	2	4	0	42	10
Sutjeska	2018–19	Montenegrin First League	30	5	4	0	4	0	38	5
Sutjeska	2019–20	Montenegrin First League	31	10	2	0	6	0	39	10
Sutjeska	2020–21	Montenegrin First League	30	3	1	0	1	0	32	3
Sutjeska	Total		91	18	7	0	11	0	109	18
Career total			431	72	28	8	29	4	488	84

=== International ===
As of 17 April 2016

Montenegro national team
Year	Apps	Goals
2010	1	0
2011	2	0
2012	2	0
2013	1	1
Total	6	1

=== International goals ===
As of match played 14 June 2016. Montenegro score listed first, score column indicates score after each Ćetković goal.

International goals by date, venue, cap, opponent, score, result and competition
No.	Date	Venue	Cap	Opponent	Score	Result	Competition
1	17 November 2013	Stade Josy Barthel, Route d'Arlon, Luxembourg	6	Luxembourg	4–1	4–1	Friendly

== Honours ==
=== Club ===
Zeta

- Montenegrin First League: 2006–07

Partizan

- Serbian SuperLiga: 2007–08
- Serbian Cup: 2007–08

Mogren

- Montenegrin First League: 2008–09, 2010–11

Laçi

- Albanian Cup: 2014–15
- Albanian Supercup: 2015

Mladost Podgorica

- Montenegrin Cup: 2017–18

Sutjeska

- Montenegrin First League: 2018–19
