= 2017–18 Montenegrin First League =

Montenegrin First League
- Season: 2017–18
- Dates: 5 August 2017 – 26 May 2018
- Champions: Sutjeska; 3rd title
- Relegated: Dečić; Kom
- Champions League: Sutjeska
- Europa League: Budućnost; Mladost; Rudar
- Matches: 180
- Goals: 371 (2.06 per match)
- Top goalscorer: Igor Ivanović (14 goals)
- Biggest home win: Mladost 5–0 Petrovac (2 December 2017)
- Biggest away win: Dečić 1–4 Zeta (5 August 2017); Dečić 1–4 Mladost (14 April 2018); Rudar 0–3 Sutjeska (25 November 2017); Dečić 0–3 Iskra (26 May 2018)
- Highest scoring: Dečić 3–3 Grbalj (16 August 2017); Mladost 3–3 Budućnost (22 October 2017)

The 2017–18 Montenegrin First League was the 12th season of the top-tier football in Montenegro. The season began on 5 August 2017 and ended on 26 May 2018. Budućnost Podgorica are the defending champions.

The league champions earned a place in the 2018–19 Champions League first qualifying round, and the second and third placed clubs earned a place in the 2018–19 Europa League first qualifying round. Since the third-placed Mladost Podgorica won the 2017–18 Montenegrin Cup which earned them the same spot in the Europa League, the spot was taken by the fourth-placed team.

There was one new club this season, Kom, who earned promotion from the Montenegrin Second League. Bokelj, Lovćen and Jedinstvo Bijelo Polje were relegated after the 2016–17 season, as the league's contestants amount was reduced from 12 clubs to 10.

== Teams ==
Locations of the teams for the 2017–18 season

Team	City	Stadium	Capacity	Coach
Budućnost	Podgorica	Stadion pod Goricom	15,230	(Montenegro) Dragoje Miloradović
Dečić	Tuzi	Stadion Tuško Polje	5,000	(Montenegro) Mirko Marić
Grbalj	Radanovići	Stadion Donja Sutvara	1,500	(Montenegro) Dragan Radojičić
Iskra	Danilovgrad	Stadion Braće Velašević	2,000	(Serbia) Jovan Stanković
Kom	Podgorica	Stadion Zlatica	3,000	(Montenegro) Veselin Stešević
Mladost	Podgorica	Camp FSCG	2,000	(Montenegro) Dejan Vukićević
Petrovac	Petrovac	Stadion pod Malim brdom	1,630	(Montenegro) Rudolf Marčić
Rudar	Pljevlja	Stadion pod Golubinjom	10,000	(Montenegro) Radislav Dragićević
Sutjeska	Nikšić	Stadion kraj Bistrice	6,180	(Montenegro) Nikola Rakojević
Zeta	Golubovci	Stadion Trešnjica	5,000	(Montenegro) Dejan Roganović

== League table ==
Pos	Team	Pld	W	D	L	GF	GA	GD	Pts	Qualification or relegation
1	Sutjeska (C)	36	24	7	5	55	23	+32	79	Qualification for the Champions League first qualifying round
2	Budućnost	36	14	15	7	44	30	+14	57	Qualification for the Europa League first qualifying round (Note: Since the winners of the 2017–18 Montenegrin Cup, Mladost, qualified for European competition based on league position, the spot awarded to the cup winners (Europa League first qualifying round) was passed to the fourth-placed team. However, since Grbalj failed to obtain a UEFA license, their Europa league spot was passed to the fifth-placed team.)
3	Mladost	36	12	15	9	42	33	+9	51	Qualification for the Europa League first qualifying round
4	Grbalj	36	12	14	10	39	39	0	50	
5	Rudar	36	13	10	13	32	28	+4	49 (Note: Rudar finished ahead of Zeta on head-to-head points: Rudar 6 points, Zeta 3 points.)	Qualification for the Europa League first qualifying round
6	Zeta	36	12	13	11	40	35	+5	49	
7	Iskra	36	12	9	15	33	34	−1	45	
8	Kom (R)	36	11	10	15	36	45	−9	43	Qualification for the relegation play-offs
9	Petrovac (O)	36	9	11	16	25	40	−15	38	Qualification for the relegation play-offs
10	Dečić (R)	36	3	12	21	25	64	−39	21	Relegation to the Second League

Source: Football Association of Montenegro (in Montenegrin), UEFA, Soccerway
Rules for classification: 1) Points; 2) Head-to-head points; 3) Head-to-head goal difference; 3) Head-to-head goals scored; 5) Head-to-head away goals scored; 6) Goal difference; 7) Goals scored; 8) Draw.
(C) Champions; (O) Play-off winners; (R) Relegated

== Results ==
The ten clubs played each other four times for a total of 36 matches each.

Home \ Away	BUD	DEČ	GRB	ISK	KOM	MLA	PET	RUD	SUT	ZET	BUD	DEČ	GRB	ISK	KOM	MLA	PET	RUD	SUT	ZET
Budućnost	—	4–1	4–1	3–0	1–0	1–0	0–0	1–0	3–1	2–1	—	3–1	0–0	0–1	1–1	1–1	1–1	0–0	2–3	1–1
Dečić	0–0	—	3–3	3–1	1–1	1–1	2–1	0–0	0–0	1–4	0–1	—	0–0	0–3	1–3	1–4	0–1	1–2	0–0	1–2
Grbalj	1–2	1–1	—	0–1	3–2	0–2	0–2	1–0	1–1	2–1	0–0	1–1	—	0–2	2–2	2–1	0–0	1–0	2–3	2–0
Iskra	0–0	4–1	0–0	—	1–1	0–1	0–0	0–2	0–1	1–1	0–1	2–0	1–3	—	3–0	1–1	2–3	0–0	0–1	2–1
Kom	0–1	2–1	0–0	1–0	—	2–1	2–1	1–0	0–1	1–1	2–3	1–2	1–3	0–0	—	0–1	2–0	0–2	0–1	0–1
Mladost	3–3	0–0	2–1	2–0	2–2	—	5–0	1–1	0–2	0–1	1–1	2–0	0–0	1–0	1–1	—	1–1	2–0	2–1	2–3
Petrovac	0–0	1–0	2–3	0–1	0–1	1–0	—	0–0	0–1	0–1	2–1	3–1	0–1	0–0	0–1	0–0	—	2–0	1–0	0–0
Rudar	2–0	4–0	0–1	0–1	1–0	0–1	4–1	—	0–3	0–0	0–0	1–0	1–0	0–2	1–1	2–0	3–1	—	2–1	0–0
Sutjeska	1–0	3–0	1–0	2–1	4–0	1–1	3–0	3–0	—	1–0	3–2	2–0	1–1	3–1	0–1	0–0	1–0	2–1	—	1–1
Zeta	1–0	1–1	1–1	1–2	4–2	3–0	0–0	0–0	1–2	—	1–1	2–0	1–2	1–0	0–2	0–0	3–1	1–3	0–1	—

Source: Football Association of Montenegro (in Montenegrin)
Legend: Blue = home team win; Yellow = draw; Red = away team win.
For upcoming matches, an "a" indicates there is an article about the rivalry between the two participants.

== Relegation play-offs ==
The 10th-placed team (against the 3rd-placed team of the Second League) and the 11th-placed team (against the runners-up of the Second League) will both compete in two-legged relegation play-offs after the end of the season.

=== Summary ===
Team 1	Agg.	Team 2	1st leg	2nd leg
Kom	1–2	Lovćen	0–0	1–2
Mladost Lješkopolje	2–5	Petrovac	0–3	2–2

=== Matches ===
30 May 2018
17:30 CEST

Kom	0–0	Lovćen
	Report

Stadion Zlatica, Podgorica
Attendance: 1,000
Referee: Miloš Novović
3 June 2018
17:30 CEST

Lovćen	2–1	Kom
Marković 23'; Đurović 56' (pen.)	Report	Đukić 42'

Stadion Trešnjica, Golubovci
Attendance: 800
Referee: Mileta Šćepanović

Lovćen won 2–1 on aggregate.

30 May 2018
17:30 CEST

Mladost Lješkopolje	0–3	Petrovac
	Report	Krivokapić 10' (o.g.); Muharemović 38'; Boričić 87'

Stari Ribnjak Stadium, Podgorica
Attendance: 1,000
Referee: Nikola Dabanović
3 June 2018
17:30 CEST

Petrovac	2–2	Mladost Lješkopolje
Kalezić 42'; Đorđević 90+3'	Report	Muhović 53', 56'

Stadion pod Malim brdom, Petrovac
Attendance: 250
Referee: Nikola Vođević

Petrovac won 5–2 on aggregate.

== Top scorers ==
Rank	Scorer	Club	Goals
1	(Montenegro) Igor Ivanović	Sutjeska	14
2	(Montenegro) Nikola Krstović	Zeta	13
2	(Bosnia and Herzegovina) Alen Melunović	Budućnost	13
4	(Montenegro) Ivan Vuković	Grbalj	11
5	(Montenegro) Darko Nikać	Budućnost	9
6	(Montenegro) Marko Ćetković	Mladost	8
6	(Montenegro) Luka Merdović	Sutjeska	8
8	(Montenegro) Stefan Đorđević	Petrovac	7
8	(Montenegro) Benjamin Kacić	Petrovac	7
8	(Montenegro) Božo Marković	Sutjeska	7
8	(Montenegro) Bogdan Milić	Iskra	7
8	(Montenegro) Miljan Vlaisavljević	Budućnost	7

== See also ==
- Montenegrin First League
- 2017–18 Montenegrin Second League
