= 2007–08 Montenegrin First League =

Montenegrin First League
- Season: 2007–08
- Dates: 11 August 2007 – 24 May 2008
- Champions: Budućnost; 1st title
- Relegated: Mladost; Bokelj
- Champions League: Budućnost
- UEFA Cup: Zeta; Mogren
- Intertoto Cup: Grbalj
- Matches: 198
- Goals: 401 (2.03 per match)
- Top goalscorer: Ivan Jablan (13 goals)
- Biggest home win: Zeta 8–3 Bokelj (17 May 2008)
- Biggest away win: Kom 0–4 Lovćen (24 November 2007)
- Highest scoring: Zeta 8–3 Bokelj (17 May 2008)
- Longest winning run: 6 games Budućnost
- Longest unbeaten run: 21 games Budućnost
- Longest losing run: 7 games Bokelj

The 2007–08 Montenegrin First League was the second season of top-tier football in Montenegro, since the vote for Montenegrin independence split the Montenegrin FA from Serbia's. FK Jedinstvo and FK Berane were relegated to the second league, giving FK Bokelj their first time in the top league of Montenegro. The 2007-08 season began on 11 August 2007 and ended on 24 May 2008.

== Teams ==
FK Berane was directly relegated to the Montenegrin Second League after finishing 12th in last year's standings. Their place was taken by Second League champions Lovćen Cetinje.

10th placed Dečić Tuzi and 11th placed Jedinstvo Bijelo Polje had to compete in two-legged relegation play-offs. Jedinstvo was relegated by losing 4–2 on aggregate against the 2nd placed team from Second League, Bokelj Kotor. On the other hand, Dečić saved their place in Montenegrin top league by beating cross-town rivals Ibar Rožaje, who had finished in 3rd place in the Second League, with a 3–2 aggregate.

=== Stadia and locations ===
Location of the 2007–08 Montenegrin First League teams

Team	City	Stadium	Capacity	Coach
Bokelj	Kotor	Stadion Pod Vrmcem	5,000	(Montenegro) Ivo Donković
Budućnost	Podgorica	Stadion Pod Goricom	17,000	(Serbia) Branko Babić
Dečić	Tuzi	Stadion Tuško Polje	1,250	(Montenegro) Božidar Vuković
Grbalj	Radanovići	Stadion Donja Sutvara	1,500	(Serbia) Nebojša Vignjević
Kom	Podgorica	Stadion Zlatica	2,500	(Montenegro) Goran Đurović
Lovćen	Cetinje	Stadion Obilića Poljana	2,000	(Montenegro) Nikola Rakojević
Mladost	Podgorica	Cvijetni Brijeg	2,000	(Montenegro) Slobodan Šćepanović
Mogren	Budva	Stadion Lugovi	4,000	(Montenegro) Dejan Vukićević
Petrovac	Petrovac	Stadion Pod Malim Brdom	1,400	(Montenegro) Obren Sarić
Rudar	Pljevlja	Stadion Pod Golubinjom	10,000	(Montenegro) Branislav Milačić
Sutjeska	Nikšić	Stadion Kraj Bistrice	10,000	(Montenegro) Brajan Nenezić
Zeta	Golubovci	Stadion Trešnjica	7,000	(Montenegro) Mladen Vukićević

== League table ==
Pos	Team	Pld	W	D	L	GF	GA	GD	Pts	Qualification or relegation
1	Budućnost (C)	33	18	12	3	43	13	+30	66 (Note: Head-to-head points: Budućnost 10 pts, Zeta 6 pts, Mogren 6 pts.)	Qualification for the Champions League second qualifying round
2	Zeta	33	19	9	5	56	28	+28	66	Qualification for the UEFA Cup first qualifying round (Note: Since winners of the 2007–08 Montenegrin Cup, Mogren, have secured a top three position in the league the fourth-placed team was qualified to the Intertoto Cup first round (originally it was third-placed team).)
3	Mogren	33	19	9	5	46	21	+25	66	Qualification for the UEFA Cup first qualifying round
4	Grbalj	33	14	13	6	40	25	+15	55	Qualification for the Intertoto Cup first round
5	Rudar	33	14	10	9	38	26	+12	52	
6	Lovćen	33	11	10	12	28	30	−2	43	
7	Dečić	33	10	8	15	26	37	−11	38	
8	Petrovac	33	8	12	13	36	46	−10	36	
9	Kom	33	9	9	15	29	49	−20	36	
10	Bokelj (R)	33	8	8	17	24	38	−14	32	Qualification for the relegation play-offs
11	Sutjeska (Note: Sutjeska were docked 3 points for not playing match against Zeta in the 13th round.) (O)	33	5	11	17	19	44	−25	23	Qualification for the relegation play-offs
12	Mladost (R)	33	4	7	22	16	44	−28	19	Relegated to the Second League

Source: Soccerway
Rules for classification: 1) Points; 2) Head-to-head points; 3) Head-to-head goal difference; 4) Head-to-head goals scored; 5) Head-to-head away goals scored; 6) Goal difference; 7) Goals scored; 8) Draw.
(C) Champions; (O) Play-off winners; (R) Relegated

== Results ==
The schedule consists of three rounds. During the first two rounds, each team played each other once home and away for a total of 22 matches. The pairings of the third round will then be set according to the standings after the first two rounds, giving every team a third game against each opponent for a total of 33 games per team.

=== First and second round ===
Home \ Away	BOK	BUD	DEČ	GRB	KOM	LOV	MLA	MOG	PET	RUD	SUT	ZET
Bokelj		0–1	1–0	0–1	1–2	1–1	2–0	0–2	0–2	0–2	0–1	0–1
Budućnost	1–0		2–0	2–3	0–0	1–0	1–0	1–1	1–0	1–1	2–0	2–1
Dečić	3–1	1–0		0–0	2–0	1–0	0–0	1–1	2–1	0–1	1–1	0–1
Grbalj	1–0	1–1	3–1		0–0	2–0	2–1	0–2	1–1	1–1	1–1	1–2
Kom	2–0	1–0	0–1	0–0		0–4	0–0	1–3	1–0	2–1	2–1	2–1
Lovćen	0–0	0–1	0–2	3–2	0–0		2–0	1–0	2–2	1–0	4–1	1–1
Mladost	0–1	0–1	0–3	1–2	0–2	0–1		0–2	0–0	0–0	0–0	1–1
Mogren	2–0	1–1	2–0	0–3	3–1	1–0	2–1		0–1	1–1	1–0	2–2
Petrovac	2–4	1–1	1–1	4–2	1–1	1–1	2–1	0–2		1–0	2–0	1–1
Rudar	0–0	0–1	2–1	0–0	3–0	2–0	3–1	0–0	1–0		1–0	1–2
Sutjeska	0–0	1–1	2–0	0–0	1–0	1–1	2–1	0–0	0–1	1–2		0–3 (Note: The match was supposed to be played on 10 November. when it was postponed to 21 November. In the new term, the match was not played again because the host did not provide basic conditions. There was no electricity or hot water at the stadium in Nikšić. It was registered with the official score of 0–3.)
Zeta	0–1	0–0	2–1	1–0	2–0	1–0	1–0	1–0	4–1	0–1	1–0	

Source: Football Association of Montenegro (in Montenegrin),
Legend: Blue = home team win; Yellow = draw; Red = away team win.

=== Third round ===
Key numbers for pairing determination (number marks position after 22 games):

Rounds
23rd	24th	25th	26th	27th	28th	29th	30th	31st	32nd	33rd
1 – 12; 2 – 11; 3 – 10; 4 – 9; 5 – 8; 6 – 7	1 – 2; 8 – 6; 9 – 5; 10 – 4; 11 – 3; 12 – 7	2 – 12; 3 – 1; 4 – 11; 5 – 10; 6 – 9; 7 – 8	1 – 4; 2 – 3; 9 – 7; 10 – 6; 11 – 5; 12 – 8	3 – 12; 4 – 2; 5 – 1; 6 – 11; 7 – 10; 8 – 9	1 – 6; 2 – 5; 3 – 4; 10 – 8; 11 – 7; 12 – 9	4 – 12; 5 – 3; 6 – 2; 7 – 1; 8 – 11; 9 – 10	1 – 8; 2 – 7; 3 – 6; 4 – 5; 11 – 9; 12 – 10	5 – 12; 6 – 4; 7 – 3; 8 – 2; 9 – 1; 10 – 11	1 – 10; 2 – 9; 3 – 8; 4 – 7; 5 – 6; 12 – 11	6 – 12; 7 – 5; 8 – 4; 9 – 3; 10 – 2; 11 – 1

Home \ Away	BOK	BUD	DEČ	GRB	KOM	LOV	MLA	MOG	PET	RUD	SUT	ZET
Bokelj		1–0			2–2	1–0				0–1	4–1	
Budućnost			4–0	0–0			2–0	3–0	3–0		4–0	
Dečić	1–1			1–0				0–1	1–1			1–4
Grbalj	1–0				3–1	2–0	2–0	0–0				0–0
Kom		1–4	2–0				2–3		1–3	0–0	1–1	
Lovćen		0–0	0–0		1–0					2–1	0–1	
Mladost	1–0		0–1			0–1			1–1		1–0	
Mogren	0–0				4–1	4–0	2–0			2–0		2–0
Petrovac	0–0			0–2		0–1		1–2				2–3
Rudar		0–0	2–0	1–3			1–2		5–2		2–0	
Sutjeska			1–1	1–1				1–2	1–1			0–3
Zeta	8–3	0–0			4–1	1–1	2–1			2–2		

Source: Football Association of Montenegro (in Montenegrin),
Legend: Blue = home team win; Yellow = draw; Red = away team win.

== Relegation play-offs ==
The 10th placed team (against the 3rd placed team of the Second League) and the 11th placed team (against the 2nd placed team of the Second League) will both compete in two-legged relegation play-offs after the end of the season.

=== Summary ===
Team 1	Agg.	Team 2	1st leg	2nd leg
Sutjeska	1–0	Čelik	1–0	0–0
Bokelj	0–3	Jedinstvo	0–0	0–3 (w/o)

=== Matches ===
28 May 2008
17:30 CEST

Sutjeska	1–0	Čelik
Adrović 59'	Report (page 37)

Stadion kraj Bistrice, Nikšić
Attendance: 8,000
Referee: Ranko Spasojević
1 June 2008
17:30 CEST

Čelik	0–0	Sutjeska
	Report (page 37)

Stadion kraj Bistrice, Nikšić
Attendance: 9,000
Referee: Aleksandar Marković

Sutjeska won 1–0 on aggregate.

28 May 2008
17:30 CEST

Bokelj	0–0	Jedinstvo
	Report (page 37)

Stadion pod Vrmcem, Kotor
Attendance: 1,200
Referee: Aleksandar Marković
1 June 2008
17:30 CEST

Jedinstvo	3–0 Awarded (Note: The match was interrupted in the 85th minute with the score of 1–0, due to the attack of the visiting fans on the referee, it was registered with the official score of 3–0 in favor of Jedinstvo.)	Bokelj
Čindrak 80'	Report

Gradski stadion, Bijelo Polje
Attendance: 2,500

Jedinstvo won 3–0 on aggregate.

== Top scorers ==
Rank	Scorer	Club	Goals
1	(Montenegro) Ivan Jablan	Lovćen	13
2	(Montenegro) Mirza Ljumić	Kom	5
2	(Montenegro) Minja Ljumović	Dečić	5
2	(Montenegro) Božo Milić	Grbalj	5
5	(Montenegro) Goran Burzanović	Petrovac	4
5	(Montenegro) Miloš Đalac	Grbalj	4
5	(Montenegro) Bojan Ivanović	Zeta	4
5	(Montenegro) Dražen Milić	Mogren	4
5	(Montenegro) Blažo Perutović	Lovćen	4
5	(Montenegro) Miodrag Zec	Mogren	4
5	(Montenegro) Ratko Zec	Mogren	4
