= 2010–11 Montenegrin First League =

Montenegrin First League
- Season: 2010–11
- Dates: 14 August 2010 – 28 May 2011
- Champions: Mogren; 2nd title
- Relegated: Bar; Mornar
- Champions League: Mogren
- Europa League: Budućnost; Rudar; Zeta
- Matches: 198
- Goals: 430 (2.17 per match)
- Top goalscorer: Ivan Vuković (20 goals)
- Biggest home win: Mogren 5–0 Dečić (21 August 2010)
- Biggest away win: Mornar 0–5 Mogren (25 September 2010)
- Highest scoring: Bar 2–5 Lovćen (25 August 2010); Budućnost 4–3 Petrovac (11 September 2010); Rudar 4–3 Grbalj (2 April 2011)
- Longest winning run: 7 games Mogren
- Longest unbeaten run: 18 games Mogren
- Longest losing run: 11 games Bar

The 2010–11 Montenegrin First League (also known as T-Com 1.CFL for sponsorship reasons) was the fifth season of the top-tier football in Montenegro. The season began on 14 August 2010 and ended on 28 May 2011. Rudar were the defending champions having won their first Montenegrin championship last season.

== Teams ==
Kom were directly relegated to the Montenegrin Second League after finishing 12th last season. Their place was taken by Second League champions Mladost Podgorica.

10th-placed Mornar and 11th-placed Berane had to compete in two-legged relegation play-offs. Mornar kept their place in the First League by beating Second League third place finisher Bratstvo Cijevna 3–1 on aggregate. On the other hand, Berane were relegated after losing to Second League runners-up Bar 5–4 on penalties after the two clubs ended 2–2 on aggregate.

=== Stadia and locations ===
Location of the 2010–11 Montenegrin First League teams

Team	City	Stadium	Capacity	Coach
Bar	Bar	Stadion Topolica	5,000	(Montenegro) Zlatko Kostić
Budućnost	Podgorica	Stadion Pod Goricom	17,000	(Montenegro) Saša Petrović
Dečić	Tuzi	Stadion Tuško Polje	1,000	(Montenegro) Mladen Vukićević
Grbalj	Radanovići	Stadion Donja Sutvara	1,500	(Montenegro) Dragan Radojičić
Lovćen	Cetinje	Stadion Obilića Poljana	5,000	(Montenegro) Marko Marković
Mladost	Podgorica	Stadion Cvijetni Brijeg	1,500	(Montenegro) Miodrag Vukotić
Mogren	Budva	Stadion Lugovi	4,000	(Montenegro) Branislav Milačić
Mornar	Bar	Stadion Topolica	5,000	(Montenegro) Boris Ljutica
Petrovac	Petrovac	Stadion Pod Malim Brdom	1,000	(Montenegro) Milorad Malovrazić
Rudar	Pljevlja	Gradski stadion Pljevlja	10,000	(Serbia) Nebojša Vignjević
Sutjeska	Nikšić	Stadion kraj Bistrice	10,800	(Montenegro) Dragan Mijanović
Zeta	Golubovci	Stadion Trešnjica	7,000	(Montenegro) Dejan Vukićević

== League table ==
Pos	Team	Pld	W	D	L	GF	GA	GD	Pts	Qualification or relegation
1	Mogren (C)	33	22	7	4	60	24	+36	73	Qualification for the Champions League second qualifying round
2	Budućnost	33	22	7	4	58	29	+29	73	Qualification for the Europa League first qualifying round
3	Rudar	33	16	7	10	44	29	+15	55	Qualification for the Europa League second qualifying round (Note: Rudar are the winners of 2010–11 Montenegrin Cup and therefore qualified for the second qualifying round of the 2011–12 UEFA Europa League; since they finished the season in third place, Zeta as fourth-placed team also qualified for the first qualifying round of the Europa League.)
4	Zeta	33	12	13	8	36	29	+7	49	Qualification for the Europa League first qualifying round
5	Mladost	33	10	11	12	36	35	+1	41	
6	Dečić	33	10	9	14	24	33	−9	39	
7	Grbalj	33	10	8	15	30	35	−5	38	
8	Lovćen	33	9	10	14	29	36	−7	37	
9	Petrovac	33	8	11	14	26	38	−12	35	
10	Mornar (R)	33	9	7	17	25	45	−20	34	Qualification for the relegation play-offs
11	Sutjeska (O)	33	9	7	17	32	54	−22	34	Qualification for the relegation play-offs
12	Bar (R)	33	7	11	15	30	43	−13	32	Relegation to the Second League

Source: Soccerway
Rules for classification: 1) Points; 2) Head-to-head points; 3) Head-to-head goal difference; 4) Head-to-head goals scored; 5) Head-to-head away goals scored; 6) Goal difference; 7) Goals scored; 8) Draw.
(C) Champions; (O) Play-off winners; (R) Relegated

== Results ==
The schedule consisted of three rounds. During the first two rounds, each team played each other once home and away for a total of 22 matches. The pairings of the third round were then set according to the standings after the first two rounds, giving every team a third game against each opponent for a total of 33 games per team.

=== First and second round ===
Home \ Away	BAR	BUD	DEČ	GRB	LOV	MLA	MOG	MOR	PET	RUD	SUT	ZET
Bar		0–0	0–0	1–0	2–5	1–2	2–4	1–0	1–1	0–2	2–0	0–0
Budućnost	1–0		2–2	2–1	2–0	3–3	1–2	3–1	4–3	0–1	2–1	0–0
Dečić	1–1	0–2		2–0	1–0	1–0	0–1	2–0	2–0	1–0	1–0	0–0
Grbalj	3–0	1–3	2–2		0–0	0–1	0–1	1–0	1–2	0–1	0–0	1–1
Lovćen	0–1	1–3	1–0	1–0		0–0	0–1	2–2	0–0	1–0	1–1	0–2
Mladost	1–0	0–2	0–0	1–2	1–1		2–2	1–0	1–1	2–0	5–1	2–0
Mogren	3–1	2–0	5–0	0–0	0–0	1–0		2–0	3–1	1–0	4–1	0–0
Mornar	1–0	1–2	1–0	0–0	2–1	0–0	0–5		2–1	0–1	2–1	0–0
Petrovac	0–3	0–2	2–0	0–1	1–0	0–0	0–0	1–1		0–2	1–0	2–0
Rudar	0–0	0–2	1–0	0–1	1–1	2–1	4–0	2–1	3–0		3–0	2–1
Sutjeska	3–1	1–2	2–1	1–2	1–2	2–1	1–4	2–0	1–1	0–0		1–1
Zeta	2–0	0–2	0–0	1–0	2–0	2–1	1–2	4–0	1–0	1–0	3–1	

Source: Football Association of Montenegro (in Montenegrin)
Legend: Blue = home team win; Yellow = draw; Red = away team win.

=== Third round ===
Key numbers for pairing determination (number marks position after 22 games):

Rounds
23rd	24th	25th	26th	27th	28th	29th	30th	31st	32nd	33rd
1 – 12; 2 – 11; 3 – 10; 4 – 9; 5 – 8; 6 – 7	1 – 2; 8 – 6; 9 – 5; 10 – 4; 11 – 3; 12 – 7	2 – 12; 3 – 1; 4 – 11; 5 – 10; 6 – 9; 7 – 8	1 – 4; 2 – 3; 9 – 7; 10 – 6; 11 – 5; 12 – 8	3 – 12; 4 – 2; 5 – 1; 6 – 11; 7 – 10; 8 – 9	1 – 6; 2 – 5; 3 – 4; 10 – 8; 11 – 7; 12 – 9	4 – 12; 5 – 3; 6 – 2; 7 – 1; 8 – 11; 9 – 10	1 – 8; 2 – 7; 3 – 6; 4 – 5; 11 – 9; 12 – 10	5 – 12; 6 – 4; 7 – 3; 8 – 2; 9 – 1; 10 – 11	1 – 10; 2 – 9; 3 – 8; 4 – 7; 5 – 6; 12 – 11	6 – 12; 7 – 5; 8 – 4; 9 – 3; 10 – 2; 11 – 1

Home \ Away	BAR	BUD	DEČ	GRB	LOV	MLA	MOG	MOR	PET	RUD	SUT	ZET
Bar		1–2	3–0	0–0							0–1	3–3
Budućnost					1–0	2–0		3–2	1–1	2–1	3–0	
Dečić		0–0			2–0			0–1	0–2		1–1	3–0
Grbalj		1–0	0–2		1–0						5–0	1–1
Lovćen	1–0					2–2	0–1		3–2	2–2		
Mladost	3–1		1–0	3–1			1–1	0–1		1–3		
Mogren	1–2	1–2	4–1	2–0				2–0				2–0
Mornar	1–1			2–0	0–1				1–0		3–1	
Petrovac	0–0			1–2		0–0	1–1			0–1		
Rudar	2–2		2–0	4–3			0–1	1–1				2–2
Sutjeska					0–2	2–0	3–1		2–0	2–1		
Zeta		2–2			2–1	1–0		3–0	0–1		0–0	

Source: Football Association of Montenegro (in Montenegrin)
Legend: Blue = home team win; Yellow = draw; Red = away team win.

== Relegation play-offs ==
The 10th-placed team (against the 3rd-placed team of the Second League) and the 11th-placed team (against the runners-up of the Second League) will both compete in two-legged relegation play-offs after the end of the season.

=== Summary ===
Team 1	Agg.	Team 2	1st leg	2nd leg
Jedinstvo	0–1	Sutjeska	0–0	0–1
Mornar	1–1 (a)	Berane	1–1	0–0

=== Matches ===
1 June 2011
17:30 CEST

Jedinstvo	0–0	Sutjeska
	Report (page 37)

Gradski stadion, Bijelo Polje
Attendance: 2,500
Referee: Jovan Kaluđerović
5 June 2011
17:30 CEST

Sutjeska	1–0	Jedinstvo
Dževerdanović 90'	Report (page 37)

Stadion kraj Bistrice, Nikšić
Attendance: 3,000
Referee: Nikola Dabanović

Sutjeska won 1–0 on aggregate.

1 June 2011
17:30 CEST

Mornar	1–1	Berane
Kasapi 70'	Report (page 37)	Radović 57'

Stadion Topolica, Bar
Attendance: 1,000
Referee: Aleksandar Marković
5 June 2011
17:30 CEST

Berane	0–0	Mornar
	Report (page 37)

Gradski stadion, Berane
Attendance: 3,500
Referee: Jovan Kaluđerović

1–1 on aggregate. Berane won on away goals.

== Top scorers ==
Rank	Scorer	Club	Goals
1	(Montenegro) Ivan Vuković	Budućnost	20
2	(Montenegro) Žarko Korać	Zeta	19
3	(Montenegro) Božo Marković	Sutjeska	16
4	(Serbia) Ivica Jovanović	Rudar	13
5	(Montenegro) Vladimir Gluščević	Mogren	11
5	(Montenegro) Ivan Jablan	Lovćen	11
7	(Serbia) Igor Matić	Mogren	9
8	(Montenegro) Dragan Bošković	Budućnost	8
8	(Montenegro) Marko Ćetković	Mogren	8
8	(Montenegro) Milan Đurišić	Mladost	8

== See also ==
- 2010–11 Montenegrin Cup
