= Nenad Brnović =

Montenegrin footballer and manager (born 1980)

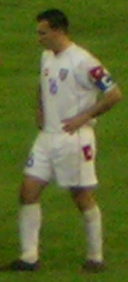
- Brnović captaining Serbia and Montenegro in 2005

Personal information
- Full name: Nenad Brnović
- Date of birth: 18 January 1980 (age 46)
- Place of birth: Titograd, SFR Yugoslavia
- Height: 1.77 m (5 ft 10 in)
- Position: Midfielder

Senior career*
Years	Team	Apps	(Gls)
1997–1998	Zabjelo	28	(0)
1998–1999	Mladost Apatin	13	(0)
1998–1999	Hajduk Kula	2	(0)
1999–2004	Zeta	143	(18)
2004–2009	Partizan	48	(7)
2009	→ Rad (loan)	13	(0)
2009–2011	Budućnost Podgorica	52	(3)
2011	Mes Sarcheshmeh	17	(2)
2012	Vllaznia	9	(0)
2012	Mogren	15	(1)
2013	Zeta	14	(0)
2013–2015	Lovćen	53	(0)

International career
2002–2005	FR Yugoslavia / Serbia and Montenegro	16	(0)

Managerial career
- 2015: Zeta
- 2022–2023: Sutjeska Nikšić
- * Club domestic league appearances and goals

Nenad Brnović (Cyrillic: Ненад Брновић; born 18 January 1980) is a Montenegrin football manager and former footballer.

His older brother Bojan is also a footballer.

== Club career ==
He spent most of his club career at FK Zeta before joining FK Partizan in 2004. During a league fixture against FK Zeta on 21 March 2006, he suffered a double open-fracture of both his tibia and fibula following a challenge by Jovan Markoski in the 6th minute of the match. This resulted in two operations and a two-and-a-half-year-long battle to regain fitness.

Following the first operation at Belgrade's VMA clinic, the prognosis was 6–8 months away from the pitch, however, due to slow recovery another surgery was required. This one took place in early January 2007 at the Orthopedic clinic in Belgrade

As his contract with Partizan expired during his rehab, on 4 September 2008 Partizan management led by general-secretary Gordan Petrić and football director Ivan Tomić decided to extend Brnović's contract until summer 2009. Three days later, on 7 September 2008, Nenad played his first match after the injury, appearing for 15 minutes in a friendly against PAOK. Later in the fall 2008, he appeared in another friendly versus FK Slavija Sarajevo. By December 2008, Brnović appeared to be match-fit and ready to play competitive matches. Later that month Partizan started looking into options of moving him on loan for the first six months of his comeback.

In mid January 2009, Brnović's loan move to FK Rad was announced.

In summer 2009 Brnović moved to FK Budućnost Podgorica. Two years later he moved to Iranian Mes Sarcheshmeh, where he spent six months during which he played 18 games and scored three goals. In January 2012. he signed for Albanian club Vlaznia, but after the end of that season he came back to Montenegrin championship. During the first half of the season 2012–13. he played for Mogren, and during the second for Zeta. The last two seasons of his career as a professional player (2013-15) he spent in Lovćen, with which he won a Montenegrin Cup (2014).

== International career ==
Brnović made his debut for FR Yugoslavia (later, Serbia and Montenegro) in an April 2002 friendly match against Lithuania and earned a total of 16 caps, scoring no goals. His final international was a June 2005 friendly against Italy. He was not called up to play for the Montenegrin national team formed in 2007.

== Managerial career ==
After finishing his playing career in summer 2015. Brnović became the assistant coach in Zeta. He assisted the manager Miodrag Martać, but when Martać got fired after the series of bad results Brnović replaced him bringing Zeta its first championship win after four defeats. After two championship wins, one draw, and two defeats (the second was against the later champions Mladost) the club management decided to hire much more experienced Dejan Vukićević, and Brnović became the manager of Zeta's youth team.

== Honours ==
Partizan

- First League of Serbia and Montenegro: 2004–05
- Serbian SuperLiga: 2007–08
- Serbian Cup: 2007–08

Lovćen

- Montenegrin Cup: 2013–14
