= 2009–10 Montenegrin First League =

Montenegrin First League
- Season: 2009–10
- Dates: 8 August 2009 – 29 May 2010
- Champions: Rudar; 1st title
- Relegated: Kom; Berane
- Champions League: Rudar
- Europa League: Budućnost; Mogren; Zeta
- Matches: 198
- Goals: 484 (2.44 per match)
- Top goalscorer: Ivan Bošković (28 goals)
- Biggest home win: Grbalj 11–0 Kom (29 May 2010)
- Biggest away win: Grbalj 0–4 Budućnost (4 October 2009); Petrovac 0–4 Rudar (31 October 2009)
- Highest scoring: Grbalj 11–0 Kom (29 May 2010)
- Longest winning run: 9 games Budućnost
- Longest unbeaten run: 12 games Budućnost; Zeta
- Longest losing run: 14 games Kom

The 2009–10 Montenegrin First League (also known as T-Com 1.CFL for sponsorship reasons) was the fourth season of the top-tier football in Montenegro. The season began on 8 August 2009 and ended on 29 May 2010. Mogren Budva are the defending champions.

== Teams ==
Jedinstvo Bijelo Polje were directly relegated to the Montenegrin Second League after finishing 12th in the 2008–09 season. Their place was taken by Second League champions Berane.

10th-placed Jezero Plav and 11th-placed Dečić Tuzi had to compete in two-legged relegation play-offs. Jezero were relegated by losing 2–1 on aggregate against the 3rd-placed team from Second League, Mornar Bar. On the other hand, Dečić saved their place in the Montenegrin top league by beating Mladost Podgorica, who had finished as runners-up of the Second League, also with 2–1 on aggregate.

=== Stadia and locations ===
Location of the 2009–10 Montenegrin First League teams

Team	City	Stadium	Capacity	Coach
Berane	Berane	Gradski Stadion	11,000	(Montenegro) Predrag Pejović
Budućnost	Podgorica	Stadion Pod Goricom	17,000	(Montenegro) Nenad Vukčević
Dečić	Tuzi	Stadion Tuško Polje	1,000	(Montenegro) Slaviša Božičić
Grbalj	Radanovići	Stadion Donja Sutvara	1,500	(Montenegro) Saša Petrović
Kom	Podgorica	Stadion Zlatica	3,500	(Montenegro) Milorad Nedović
Lovćen	Cetinje	Stadion Obilića Poljana	5,000	(Montenegro) Branislav Milačić
Mogren	Budva	Stadion Lugovi	4,000	(Montenegro) Dejan Vukićević
Mornar	Bar	Stadion Topolica	5,000	(Montenegro) Brajan Nenezić
Petrovac	Petrovac	Pod Malim Brdom Stadium	530	(Montenegro) Milorad Malovrazić
Rudar	Pljevlja	Stadion Gradski	10,000	(Serbia) Nebojša Vignjević
Sutjeska	Nikšić	Stadion kraj Bistrice	10,800	(Montenegro) Nikola Rakojević
Zeta	Golubovci	Stadion Trešnjica	7,000	(Montenegro) Dragoljub Đuretić

== League table ==
Pos	Team	Pld	W	D	L	GF	GA	GD	Pts	Qualification or relegation
1	Rudar (C)	33	22	5	6	56	26	+30	71	Qualification for the Champions League first qualifying round
2	Budućnost	33	21	6	6	67	35	+32	69	Qualification for the Europa League second qualifying round (Note: Since Rudar and Budućnost, the finalists of the 2009–10 Montenegrin Cup, were finished in the top two spots in the league, the league runners-up was qualified for the second qualifying round of the UEFA Europa League.)
3	Mogren	33	16	9	8	49	34	+15	57	Qualification for the Europa League first qualifying round
4	Zeta	33	17	6	10	43	33	+10	57	Qualification for the Europa League first qualifying round
5	Grbalj	33	15	8	10	66	42	+24	53	
6	Lovćen	33	15	7	11	32	37	−5	52	
7	Sutjeska	33	11	7	15	33	36	−3	40	
8	Petrovac	33	10	6	17	38	49	−11	36	
9	Dečić	33	8	11	14	27	35	−8	35	
10	Mornar (Note: Mornar were docked 1 point because they used ineligible player in the match against Kom.) (O)	33	9	8	16	29	49	−20	34	Qualification for the relegation play-offs
11	Berane (R)	33	8	6	19	28	49	−21	30	Qualification for the relegation play-offs
12	Kom (R)	33	5	3	25	16	59	−43	18	Relegation to the Second League

Source: Soccerway
Rules for classification: 1) Points; 2) Head-to-head points; 3) Head-to-head goal difference; 4) Head-to-head goals scored; 5) Head-to-head away goals scored; 6) Goal difference; 7) Goals scored; 8) Draw.
(C) Champions; (O) Play-off winners; (R) Relegated

== Results ==
The schedule consists of three rounds. During the first two rounds, each team played each other once home and away for a total of 22 matches. The pairings of the third round will then be set according to the standings after the first two rounds, giving every team a third game against each opponent for a total of 33 games per team.

=== First and second round ===
Home \ Away	BER	BUD	DEČ	GRB	KOM	LOV	MOG	MOR	PET	RUD	SUT	ZET
Berane		1–3	1–0	2–2	3–0	1–2	0–0	1–2	1–1	0–1	2–1	1–2
Budućnost	2–1		2–1	4–1	3–0	3–1	1–2	0–2	3–2	0–0	2–1	4–2
Dečić	2–1	0–1		1–3	2–1	2–1	1–1	0–0	0–0	0–1	0–0	0–2
Grbalj	5–0	0–4	0–0		1–0	4–0	2–4	2–0	2–0	4–2	0–0	0–2
Kom	2–3	0–1	0–1	1–0		0–0	0–2	0–2	1–2	0–2	1–0	1–0
Lovćen	2–1	1–2	1–1	0–0	1–0		0–0	1–0	1–0	0–3	0–0	2–1
Mogren	4–0	0–0	0–2	0–2	3–1	1–3		4–0	1–1	0–0	4–0	0–0
Mornar	0–2	2–3	0–0	3–3	0–3 (Note: The match originally finished 0–0 but was awarded to Kom with a score of 3–0 because Mornar used ineligible player.)	1–1	1–2		1–3	0–1	1–0	0–0
Petrovac	1–2	1–1	1–3	0–2	2–0	0–2	1–2	4–2		0–4	1–0	0–1
Rudar	1–0	1–0	1–1	1–0	1–0	0–1	2–0	1–0	3–1		3–1	2–4
Sutjeska	1–0	3–1	2–0	2–2	1–0	1–1	4–0	1–2	1–0	1–2		2–1
Zeta	1–0	2–4	2–1	1–0	2–0	2–1	0–3	1–0	2–0	0–1	3–0	

Source: Football Association of Montenegro (in Montenegrin)
Legend: Blue = home team win; Yellow = draw; Red = away team win.

=== Third round ===
Key numbers for pairing determination (number marks position after 22 games):

Rounds
23rd	24th	25th	26th	27th	28th	29th	30th	31st	32nd	33rd
1 – 12; 2 – 11; 3 – 10; 4 – 9; 5 – 8; 6 – 7	1 – 2; 8 – 6; 9 – 5; 10 – 4; 11 – 3; 12 – 7	2 – 12; 3 – 1; 4 – 11; 5 – 10; 6 – 9; 7 – 8	1 – 4; 2 – 3; 9 – 7; 10 – 6; 11 – 5; 12 – 8	3 – 12; 4 – 2; 5 – 1; 6 – 11; 7 – 10; 8 – 9	1 – 6; 2 – 5; 3 – 4; 10 – 8; 11 – 7; 12 – 9	4 – 12; 5 – 3; 6 – 2; 7 – 1; 8 – 11; 9 – 10	1 – 8; 2 – 7; 3 – 6; 4 – 5; 11 – 9; 12 – 10	5 – 12; 6 – 4; 7 – 3; 8 – 2; 9 – 1; 10 – 11	1 – 10; 2 – 9; 3 – 8; 4 – 7; 5 – 6; 12 – 11	6 – 12; 7 – 5; 8 – 4; 9 – 3; 10 – 2; 11 – 1

Home \ Away	BER	BUD	DEČ	GRB	KOM	LOV	MOG	MOR	PET	RUD	SUT	ZET
Berane			1–1			1–0			0–1	2–0		0–1
Budućnost	2–0		1–1		3–1	4–0		4–0				3–1
Dečić						0–1			2–3	2–2	1–0	2–1
Grbalj	5–0	1–1	1–0		11–0		3–5	3–1				
Kom	0–0		1–0					1–1	0–2		0–1	
Lovćen				2–1	2–1				1–0	0–3	3–2	1–0
Mogren	2–0	2–2	1–0		2–1	1–0		0–0				
Mornar	2–1		2–0			1–0				2–1		0–0
Petrovac		1–2		1–2			1–2	3–1			2–1	
Rudar		2–1		3–0	3–0		3–1		2–2		2–0	
Sutjeska	0–0	2–0		0–2			2–0	3–0				
Zeta				2–2	2–0		1–0		1–1	3–2	0–0	

Source: Football Association of Montenegro (in Montenegrin)
Legend: Blue = home team win; Yellow = draw; Red = away team win.

== Relegation play-offs ==
The 10th-placed team (against the 3rd-placed team of the Second League) and the 11th-placed team (against the runners-up of the Second League) will both compete in two-legged relegation play-offs after the end of the season.

=== Summary ===
Team 1	Agg.	Team 2	1st leg	2nd leg
Bar	2–2 (4–5 p)	Berane	1–1	1–1
Bratstvo	1–3	Mornar	0–1	1–2

=== Matches ===
2 June 2010
17:00 CEST

Bar	1–1	Berane
Ljumović 60'	Report (page 37)	Lalević 39'

Stadion Topolica, Bar
Attendance: 500
Referee: Ranko Spasojević
6 June 2010
17:00 CEST

Berane	1–1 (a.e.t.)	Bar
Bulić 28'	Report (page 37)	Vuković 52'
Penalties
Đalac (penalty scored); Aković (penalty scored); Cimbaljević (penalty scored); Peličić (penalty scored); Bulić (penalty missed)	4–5	(penalty scored) Ljumović; (penalty scored) Čindrak; (penalty scored) Kovač; (penalty scored) Vuković; (penalty scored) Jovović

Gradski stadion, Berane
Attendance: 4,000
Referee: Ranko Spasojević

2–2 on aggregate. Bar won on penalties.

2 June 2010
17:00 CEST

Bratstvo	0–1	Mornar
	Report (page 37)	Peričić 2'

Stadion Trešnjica, Golubovci
Attendance: 1,000
Referee: Pavle Radovanović
6 June 2010
17:00 CEST

Mornar	2–1	Bratstvo
Rašović 60'; Peričić 87'	Report (page 37)	Jovićević 78'

Stadion Topolica, Bar
Attendance: 1,000
Referee: Pavle Radovanović

Mornar won 3–1 on aggregate.

== Top scorers ==
Rank	Scorer	Club	Goals
1	(Montenegro) Ivan Bošković	Grbalj	28
2	(Serbia) Predrag Ranđelović	Rudar	19
2	(Montenegro) Ivan Vuković	Budućnost	19
4	(Montenegro) Vladimir Gluščević	Mogren	16
5	(Montenegro) Božo Milić	Mogren	12
6	(Montenegro) Žarko Кorać	Zeta	11
7	(Montenegro) Fatos Bećiraj	Budućnost	10
8	(Montenegro) Marko Lalević	Berane	9
8	(Serbia) Igor Matić	Grbalj	9

== See also ==
- 2009–10 Montenegrin Cup
