= Miodrag Zec =

Montenegrin footballer

Personal information
- Date of birth: 4 October 1982 (age 44)
- Place of birth: Cetinje, SFR Yugoslavia
- Height: 1.78 m (5 ft 10 in)
- Position: Forward

Senior career*
Years	Team	Apps	(Gls)
2001–2002	Petrovac		
2003	Bokelj		
2003–2008	Mogren		
2004	→ Alania Vladikavkaz (loan)	3	(1)
2004–2005	→ Baku FC (loan)	7	(1)
2006	→ Baltika (loan)	31	(5)
2008	Budućnost	8	(0)
2009–2010	Rudar Pljevlja	36	(9)
2011–2012	Mogren	34	(5)
2012	Tirana	1	(0)
2014	Petrovac	11	(0)
2014–2015	Mogren	18	(2)
- * Club domestic league appearances and goals

Miodrag Zec (Serbian: Миодраг Зец; born 4 October 1982) is a Montenegrin former footballer.

== Honours ==
Baku

- Azerbaijan Cup winner: 2004–05

Mogren

- Montenegrin First League champion: 2010–11
- Montenegrin Cup winner: 2007–08

Rudar

- Montenegrin First League champion: 2009–10
- Montenegrin Cup Winner: 2009–10
