= 2014–15 Montenegrin First League =

Montenegrin First League
- Season: 2014–15
- Dates: 8 August 2014 – 29 May 2015
- Champions: Rudar; 2nd title
- Relegated: Mogren; Berane
- Champions League: Rudar
- Europa League: Sutjeska; Budućnost; Mladost
- Matches: 198
- Goals: 508 (2.57 per match)
- Top goalscorer: Goran Vujović (21 goals)
- Biggest home win: Bokelj 5–0 Mogren (1 November 2014); Zeta 5–0 Mogren (4 April 2015)
- Biggest away win: Mornar 0–7 Grbalj (23 May 2015)
- Highest scoring: Grbalj 5–4 Mladost (11 March 2015)
- Longest winning run: 6 games Rudar
- Longest unbeaten run: 15 games Mladost
- Longest losing run: 8 games Berane
- All statistics correct as of 30 May 2015.

The 2014–15 Montenegrin First League was the ninth season of the top-tier football in Montenegro. The season began on 8 August 2014 and ended on 30 May 2015.

== Teams ==
Last season, Dečić were relegated to the Montenegrin Second League, finishing in 12th place and Čelik exclusion because of financial issues. Bokelj and Berane were promoted.

=== Stadia and locations ===
Location of the 2014–15 Montenegrin First League teams

All figures for stadiums include seating capacity only, as many stadiums in Montenegro have stands without chairs which would otherwise be the actual number of people able to attend football matches not regulated by UEFA or FIFA.

Team	City	Stadium	Capacity	Coach
Berane	Berane	Gradski stadion	10,000	(Montenegro) Rade Vešović
Bokelj	Kotor	Stadion pod Vrmcem	5,000	(Montenegro) Slobodan Drašković
Budućnost	Podgorica	Stadion pod Goricom	15,230	(Montenegro) Dragan Radojičić
Grbalj	Radanovići	Stadion Donja Sutvara	1,500	(Montenegro) Veselin Jovović
Lovćen	Cetinje	Stadion Obilića Poljana	2,000	(Montenegro) Radovan Kavaja
Mladost	Podgorica	Stari Aerodrom	1,500	(Montenegro) Aleksandar Nedović
Mogren	Budva	Stadion Lugovi	2,000	(Montenegro) Branislav Milačić
Mornar	Bar	Stadion Topolica	2,000	(Montenegro) Mladen Vukićević
Petrovac	Petrovac	Stadion pod Malim brdom	1,500	(Montenegro) Milorad Malovrazić
Rudar	Pljevlja	Stadion pod Golubinjom	10,000	(Montenegro) Mirko Marić
Sutjeska	Nikšić	Stadion kraj Bistrice	6,180	(Montenegro) Dragoslav Albijanić
Zeta	Golubovci	Stadion Trešnjica	4,000	(Montenegro) Dušan Vlaisavljević

== League table ==
Pos	Team	Pld	W	D	L	GF	GA	GD	Pts	Qualification or relegation
1	Rudar (C)	33	22	6	5	58	18	+40	72	Qualification for the Champions League second qualifying round
2	Sutjeska	33	20	9	4	58	23	+35	69	Qualification for the Europa League first qualifying round (Note: Since winners of the 2014–15 Montenegrin Cup, Mladost, have secured a top four position in the league the teams placed second, third and fourth will all qualify to the Europa League first qualifying round (originally it was second and third-placed teams).)
3	Budućnost	33	18	9	6	46	20	+26	63	Qualification for the Europa League first qualifying round
4	Mladost	33	16	9	8	53	36	+17	57	Qualification for the Europa League first qualifying round
5	Grbalj	33	15	7	11	52	44	+8	52	
6	Lovćen	33	15	5	13	42	32	+10	50	
7	Petrovac	33	12	7	14	30	35	−5	43	
8	Bokelj	33	11	8	14	38	45	−7	41	
9	Zeta	33	11	7	15	48	44	+4	40	
10	Mornar (O)	33	9	5	19	32	63	−31	32	Qualification for the relegation play-offs
11	Mogren (R)	33	5	6	22	26	70	−44	21	Qualification for the relegation play-offs
12	Berane (R)	33	3	4	26	25	78	−53	13	Relegation to the Second League

Source: Football Association of Montenegro (in Montenegrin), Soccerway
Rules for classification: 1) Points; 2) Head-to-head points; 3) Head-to-head goal difference; 4) Head-to-head goals scored; 5) Head-to-head away goals scored; 6) Goal difference; 7) Goals scored; 8) Draw.
(C) Champions; (O) Play-off winners; (R) Relegated

== Results ==
The schedule consisted of three rounds. During the first two rounds, each team played each other once home and away for a total of 22 matches. The pairings of the third round were then set according to the standings after the first two rounds, giving every team a third game against each opponent for a total of 33 games per team.

=== First and second round ===
Home \ Away	BER	BOK	BUD	GRB	LOV	MLA	MOG	MOR	PET	RUD	SUT	ZET
Berane		0–2	1–2	2–3	0–5	1–3	0–2	2–3	0–1	0–4	0–2	1–1
Bokelj	1–1		0–1	1–0	0–1	0–2	5–0	0–1	2–1	1–5	1–1	1–1
Budućnost	1–0	2–2		2–3	2–0	0–0	3–0	2–0	0–1	1–0	1–2	1–0
Grbalj	1–0	1–1	0–2		1–1	5–4	4–2	1–1	1–1	0–3	2–0	1–0
Lovćen	2–0	4–1	3–2	1–0		0–1	1–0	3–1	0–1	0–2	1–2	1–1
Mladost	2–1	4–2	0–0	2–0	1–0		3–0	3–0	2–0	0–0	1–3	3–1
Mogren	2–2	0–2	0–2	0–0	1–2	1–3		1–1	1–3	0–3	0–0	2–1
Mornar	5–1	1–0	0–1	2–0	1–5	1–2	1–3		0–1	2–1	0–1	0–0
Petrovac	1–0	0–3	0–1	0–3	1–0	4–2	2–0	0–1		0–1	1–1	1–0
Rudar	3–0	2–0	1–0	0–0	1–0	0–0	2–1	3–0	1–0		0–0	2–1
Sutjeska	4–0	2–0	0–3	0–2	2–0	0–0	4–0	3–0	1–1	1–3		1–0
Zeta	3–0	3–1	1–2	2–1	2–3	1–1	3–0	0–0	2–0	1–2	2–3	

Source: Football Association of Montenegro (in Montenegrin)
Legend: Blue = home team win; Yellow = draw; Red = away team win.

=== Third round ===
Key numbers for pairing determination (number marks position after 22 games):

Rounds
23rd	24th	25th	26th	27th	28th	29th	30th	31st	32nd	33rd
1 – 12; 2 – 11; 3 – 10; 4 – 9; 5 – 8; 6 – 7	1 – 2; 8 – 6; 9 – 5; 10 – 4; 11 – 3; 12 – 7	2 – 12; 3 – 1; 4 – 11; 5 – 10; 6 – 9; 7 – 8	1 – 4; 2 – 3; 9 – 7; 10 – 6; 11 – 5; 12 – 8	3 – 12; 4 – 2; 5 – 1; 6 – 11; 7 – 10; 8 – 9	1 – 6; 2 – 5; 3 – 4; 10 – 8; 11 – 7; 12 – 9	4 – 12; 5 – 3; 6 – 2; 7 – 1; 8 – 11; 9 – 10	1 – 8; 2 – 7; 3 – 6; 4 – 5; 11 – 9; 12 – 10	5 – 12; 6 – 4; 7 – 3; 8 – 2; 9 – 1; 10 – 11	1 – 10; 2 – 9; 3 – 8; 4 – 7; 5 – 6; 12 – 11	6 – 12; 7 – 5; 8 – 4; 9 – 3; 10 – 2; 11 – 1

Home \ Away	BER	BOK	BUD	GRB	LOV	MLA	MOG	MOR	PET	RUD	SUT	ZET
Berane		0–1					2–1	2–2	3–1			2–1
Bokelj			1–0		1–1				0–0	1–0		1–2
Budućnost	4–0			1–1				3–1		0–0	1–1	3–0
Grbalj	2–1	4–1				3–1	2–1		3–1		0–6	
Lovćen	2–0		0–0	1–0				2–0		0–0		1–2
Mladost	4–1	3–0	1–2		1–0		0–3		0–0			
Mogren		0–3	1–1		0–2				1–1	1–0		
Mornar		1–2		0–7		1–0	3–2				0–1	
Petrovac			0–0		2–0			1–0		1–3		1–2
Rudar	4–1			2–0		3–1		4–3			0–1	3–1
Sutjeska	3–1	1–1			3–0	1–1	4–0		1–0			
Zeta				2–1		2–2	5–0	4–0			1–3	

Source: Football Association of Montenegro (in Montenegrin)
Legend: Blue = home team win; Yellow = draw; Red = away team win.

== Relegation play-offs ==
The 10th-placed team (against the 3rd-placed team of the Second League) and the 11th-placed team (against the runners-up of the Second League) will both compete in two-legged relegation play-offs after the end of the season.

=== Summary ===
Team 1	Agg.	Team 2	1st leg	2nd leg
Mornar	2–2 (9–8 p)	Igalo	2–0	0–2
Mogren	1–7	Dečić	0–5	1–2

=== Matches ===
3 June 2015
17:30 CEST

Mornar	2–0	Igalo
Kim Young-Seop 22'; B. Ivanović 89'

Stadion Topolica, Bar
Attendance: 600
Referee: Milovan Milačić
7 June 2015
17:30 CEST

Igalo	2–0 (a.e.t.)	Mornar
Mrdak 16'; M. Kovačević 80'
Penalties
Koprivica (penalty scored); Đurković (penalty scored); Bigović (penalty scored); Vujović (penalty scored); Mrdak (penalty scored); Ćuković (penalty scored); Šćepanović (penalty scored); Mijata (penalty scored); Kovačević (penalty missed); Bumbar (penalty missed)	8–9	(penalty scored) Vojvodić; (penalty scored) Mrvaljević (penalty scored) Lalošević; (penalty scored) Pejović; (penalty scored) Karadžić; (penalty scored) Jovančov; (penalty scored) Marković; (penalty scored) Kim Young-Seop; (penalty missed) Kalezić; (penalty scored) Ivanović

Stadion Solila, Igalo
Attendance: 1,500
Referee: Miloš Novović

2–2 on aggregate. Mornar won 9–8 on penalties.

3 June 2015
17:30 CEST

Mogren	0–5	Dečić
		Camaj 7'; I. Mijušković 32', 62'; Ramović 61'; N. Đurković 81'

Stadion Lugovi, Budva
Attendance: 700
Referee: Mileta Šćepanović
7 June 2015
17:30 CEST

Dečić	2–1	Mogren
Anđušić 24', 39'		Poček 62'

Stadion Tuško Polje, Tuzi
Attendance: 1,000
Referee: Miloš Savović

Dečić won 7–1 on aggregate.

== Top goalscorers ==
As of 31 May 2015

Rank	Scorer	Club	Goals
1	(Montenegro) Goran Vujović	Sutjeska	21
2	(Montenegro) Igor Ivanović	Rudar	13
3	(Montenegro) Ivan Jablan	Grbalj	12
3	(Serbia) Stevan Kovačević	Sutjeska	12
3	(Montenegro) Bogdan Milić	Mladost	12
6	(Montenegro) Admir Adrović	Budućnost	11
7	(Montenegro) Draško Božović	Sutjeska	10
8	(Montenegro) Petar Orlandić	Zeta	9
8	(Montenegro) Luka Rotković	Mornar	9
8	(Montenegro) Miljan Vlaisavljević	Zeta	9

Source: cg-fudbal.com
