= 2008–09 Montenegrin First League =

Montenegrin First League
- Season: 2008–09
- Dates: 9 August 2008 – 30 May 2009
- Champions: Mogren; 1st title
- Relegated: Jedinstvo; Jezero
- Champions League: Mogren
- Europa League: Budućnost; Sutjeska; Petrovac
- Matches: 198
- Goals: 480 (2.42 per match)
- Top goalscorer: Fatos Bećiraj (18 goals)
- Biggest home win: Mogren 6–0 Jedinstvo (18 March 2009); Budućnost 6–0 Jedinstvo (4 April 2009); Rudar 6–0 Jezero (25 April 2009)
- Biggest away win: Jezero 1–6 Mogren (8 November 2008)
- Highest scoring: Mogren 4–3 Rudar (27 September 2008); Budućnost 4–3 Rudar (18 October 2008); Jezero 1–6 Mogren (8 November 2008); Budućnost 6–1 Petrovac (23 May 2009); Kom 4–3 Grbalj (30 May 2009)
- Longest winning run: 6 games Mogren
- Longest unbeaten run: 18 games Budućnost
- Longest losing run: 8 games Rudar

The 2008–09 Montenegrin First League was the third season of the top-tier football in Montenegro. The season began on 9 August 2008 and ended on 30 May 2009. The defending champions are Budućnost Podgorica.

== Teams ==
Mladost Podgorica were directly relegated to the Montenegrin Second League after finishing 12th in last year's standings. Their place was taken by Second League champions Jezero Plav.

10th placed Bokelj Kotor and 11th placed Sutjeska Nikšić had to compete in two-legged relegation play-offs. Bokelj were relegated by losing 1–0 on aggregate against the 3rd placed team from Second League, Jedinstvo Bijelo Polje. On the other hand, Sutjeska saved their place in Montenegrin top league by beating cross-town rivals Čelik Nikšić, who had finished in 2nd place in the Second League, also with 1–0 on aggregate.

=== Stadia and locations ===
Location of the 2008–09 Montenegrin First League teams

Team	City	Stadium	Capacity	Coach
Budućnost	Podgorica	Stadion Pod Goricom	17,000	(Serbia) Miodrag Ješić
Dečić	Tuzi	Stadion Tuško Polje	1,000	(Montenegro) Božidar Vuković
Grbalj	Radanovići	Stadion Donja Sutvara	1,500	(Montenegro) Nenad Maslovar
Jedinstvo	Bijelo Polje	Gradski Stadion	5,000	(Montenegro) Aleksandar Jovanovski
Kom	Podgorica	Stadion Zlatica	3,500	(Montenegro) Saša Petrović
Lovćen	Cetinje	Stadion Obilića Poljana	2,000	(Montenegro) Milorad Malovrazić
Mogren	Budva	Stadion Lugovi	4,000	(Montenegro) Dejan Vukićević
Petrovac	Petrovac	Pod Malim Brdom Stadium	530	(Montenegro) Aleksandar Miljenović
Rudar	Pljevlja	Stadion Gradski	10,000	(Montenegro) Miodrag Radanović
Sutjeska	Nikšić	Stadion kraj Bistrice	10,800	(Montenegro) Nikola Rakojević
Zeta	Golubovci	Stadion Trešnjica	6,000	(Montenegro) Milan Đuretić

== League table ==
Pos	Team	Pld	W	D	L	GF	GA	GD	Pts	Qualification or relegation
1	Mogren (C)	33	23	5	5	62	24	+38	74	Qualification for the Champions League first qualifying round
2	Budućnost	33	21	7	5	72	34	+38	70	Qualification for the Europa League first qualifying round
3	Sutjeska	33	18	9	6	45	23	+22	63	Qualification for the Europa League first qualifying round
4	Grbalj	33	15	5	13	47	34	+13	50	
5	Rudar	33	12	5	16	39	37	+2	41	
6	Petrovac	33	12	5	16	42	56	−14	41	Qualification for the Europa League second qualifying round (Note: Petrovac qualified for the second qualifying round of the UEFA Europa League as winners of 2008–09 Montenegrin Cup.)
7	Lovćen	33	10	10	13	23	25	−2	40	
8	Kom	33	10	7	16	33	43	−10	37	
9	Zeta (Note: Zeta were docked a total of 10 points over two separate incidents during the season. First, they were docked 9 points because of their decision to field reserve players in their match against Mogren. Furthermore, they were docked one more point due to an incident in their match against Sutjeska. The referee refused to enter the pitch before the start of the match due to alleged verbal threats by Radojica Božović, Zeta's chairman, about Zeta must having to win in that match. Božović was also punished with a lifetime ban on performing any functions within competitions overseen by the Football Association of Montenegro (FSCG).)	33	13	7	13	36	41	−5	36	
10	Jezero (R)	33	9	6	18	30	62	−32	33	Qualification for the relegation play-offs
11	Dečić (O)	33	9	4	20	23	45	−22	31	Qualification for the relegation play-offs
12	Jedinstvo (R)	33	7	8	18	28	56	−28	29	Relegation to the Second League

Source: Soccerway
Rules for classification: 1) Points; 2) Head-to-head points; 3) Head-to-head goal difference; 4) Head-to-head goals scored; 5) Head-to-head away goals scored; 6) Goal difference; 7) Goals scored; 8) Draw.
(C) Champions; (O) Play-off winners; (R) Relegated

== Results ==
The schedule consists of three rounds. During the first two rounds, each team played each other once home and away for a total of 22 matches. The pairings of the third round will then be set according to the standings after the first two rounds, giving every team a third game against each opponent for a total of 33 games per team.

=== First and second round ===
Home \ Away	BUD	DEČ	GRB	JED	JEZ	KOM	LOV	MOG	PET	RUD	SUT	ZET
Budućnost		3–1	2–2	4–1	3–0	3–0	1–1	1–2	5–1	4–3	3–2	3–0
Dečić	0–2		0–2	1–2	1–0	2–1	0–2	0–2	1–4	1–0	1–0	0–1
Grbalj	2–1	2–0		2–1	3–0	1–0	0–0	2–1	3–1	2–1	2–0	1–2
Jedinstvo	1–2	1–0	2–1		0–1	0–0	0–1	0–0	2–1	0–0	2–2	0–0
Jezero	1–1	1–0	1–0	0–1		0–1	2–1	1–6	1–3	1–4	2–1	1–1
Kom	0–1	1–1	1–0	2–1	0–0		0–0	2–0	1–1	3–1	0–0	2–2
Lovćen	3–0	2–0	1–1	2–1	0–0	2–0		1–1	1–0	0–2	0–0	1–0
Mogren	1–0	2–0	1–0	6–0	2–1	2–1	2–0		1–1	4–3	0–1	2–0
Petrovac	0–2	2–1	0–2	1–1	5–1	2–0	1–0	1–4		1–0	1–1	0–2
Rudar	0–1	1–0	1–0	1–0	3–0	0–2	1–0	1–2	2–1		1–2	1–0
Sutjeska	0–0	2–0	1–0	1–0	1–0	2–1	1–0	2–1	2–0	3–2		1–2
Zeta	3–2	2–1	1–1	4–1	0–2	2–3	2–1	1–2	1–2	1–0	1–0	

Source: Football Association of Montenegro (in Montenegrin)
Legend: Blue = home team win; Yellow = draw; Red = away team win.

=== Third round ===
Key numbers for pairing determination (number marks position after 22 games):

Rounds
23rd	24th	25th	26th	27th	28th	29th	30th	31st	32nd	33rd
1 – 12; 2 – 11; 3 – 10; 4 – 9; 5 – 8; 6 – 7	1 – 2; 8 – 6; 9 – 5; 10 – 4; 11 – 3; 12 – 7	2 – 12; 3 – 1; 4 – 11; 5 – 10; 6 – 9; 7 – 8	1 – 4; 2 – 3; 9 – 7; 10 – 6; 11 – 5; 12 – 8	3 – 12; 4 – 2; 5 – 1; 6 – 11; 7 – 10; 8 – 9	1 – 6; 2 – 5; 3 – 4; 10 – 8; 11 – 7; 12 – 9	4 – 12; 5 – 3; 6 – 2; 7 – 1; 8 – 11; 9 – 10	1 – 8; 2 – 7; 3 – 6; 4 – 5; 11 – 9; 12 – 10	5 – 12; 6 – 4; 7 – 3; 8 – 2; 9 – 1; 10 – 11	1 – 10; 2 – 9; 3 – 8; 4 – 7; 5 – 6; 12 – 11	6 – 12; 7 – 5; 8 – 4; 9 – 3; 10 – 2; 11 – 1

Home \ Away	BUD	DEČ	GRB	JED	JEZ	KOM	LOV	MOG	PET	RUD	SUT	ZET
Budućnost		2–0		6–0					6–1	1–1	1–1	1–0
Dečić				2–0	1–0	2–1			2–1	2–0		
Grbalj	1–2	2–2		4–0					1–0	0–2		4–1
Jedinstvo								1–2	3–1	1–1	1–1	1–2
Jezero	2–2		1–2	4–2		4–2	1–0					
Kom	1–2		4–3	1–0			2–1		0–1			
Lovćen	0–2	0–0	1–0	0–1					1–1	2–0		
Mogren	2–3	3–1	1–0		2–0	2–0	0–0					
Petrovac					3–1			0–3		2–0	0–3	3–2
Rudar					6–0	1–0		0–1			0–0	0–0
Sutjeska		1–0	2–1		4–0	3–1	2–0	0–0				
Zeta		0–0			1–1	1–0	1–0	0–2			0–3 (Note: The match of Round 29 was registered as 0–3 for Sutjeska. Actually, the match was not played because the main referee Jovan Kaluđerović was being threatened by Radojica Božović, Zeta's chairman, about Zeta must having to win in that match. Due to that the referee did not want to enter the field and start the game.)	

Source: Football Association of Montenegro (in Montenegrin)
Legend: Blue = home team win; Yellow = draw; Red = away team win.

== Relegation play-offs ==
The 10th placed team (against the 3rd placed team of the Second League) and the 11th placed team (against the 2nd placed team of the Second League) will both compete in two-legged relegation play-offs after the end of the season.

=== Summary ===
Team 1	Agg.	Team 2	1st leg	2nd leg
Mladost	1–2	Dečić	0–2	1–0
Mornar	2–1	Jezero	2–1	0–0

=== Matches ===
3 June 2009
17:30 CEST

Mladost	0–2	Dečić
	Report (page 37)	Vasić 11'; Lekić 82'

Mladost Stadium, Podgorica
Attendance: 1,200
Referee: Aleksandar Marković
7 June 2009
17:30 CEST

Dečić	0–1	Mladost
	Report (page 37)	Vešović 5'

Stadion Tuško Polje, Tuzi
Attendance: 1,500
Referee: Jovan Kaluđerović

Dečić won 3–0 on aggregate.

3 June 2009
17:30 CEST

Mornar	2–1	Jezero
Bukilić 59'; Jelenić 75'	Report (page 37)	Pavićević 71'

Stadion Topolica, Bar
Attendance: 1,500
Referee: Jovan Kaluđerović
7 June 2009
17:30 CEST

Jezero	0–0	Mornar
	Report (page 37)

Stadion Pod Racinom, Plav
Attendance: 3,000
Referee: Ranko Spasojević

Mornar won 2–1 on aggregate.

== Top goalscorers ==
Rank	Scorer	Club	Goals
1	(Montenegro) Fatos Bećiraj	Budućnost	18
2	(Serbia) Predrag Ranđelović	Rudar	17
2	(Montenegro) Ivan Vuković	Budućnost	17
4	(Montenegro) Admir Adrović	Sutjeska	16
4	(Montenegro) Vladimir Gluščević	Mogren	16
6	(Montenegro) Igor Burzanović	Budućnost	10
6	(Montenegro) Balša Božović	Mogren	10
6	(Montenegro) Mehmet Divanović	Petrovac	10

== Attendances ==
#	Club	Average
1	Budućnost	3,767
2	Sutjeska	1,464
3	Jedinstvo	1,327
4	Rudar	1,270
5	Zeta	905
6	Jezero	791
7	Mogren	580
8	Grbalj	491
9	Dečić	473
10	Kom	450
11	Lovćen	400
12	Petrovac	368
