= Darko Šuškavčević =

Montenegrin footballer

Personal information
- Full name: Darko Šuškavčević
- Date of birth: 28 April 1974 (age 52)
- Place of birth: Titograd, SFR Yugoslavia
- Height: 1.89 m (6 ft 2 in)
- Position: Defender

Senior career*
Years	Team	Apps	(Gls)
1988–1990	Budućnost Podgorica		
1990–1994	Mladost Podgorica		
1994–1998	Hajduk Kula	109	(0)
1998–2000	Vojvodina	24	(2)
2000–2003	Slavia Prague	12	(1)
2003–2004	Panionios	14	(0)
2005–2007	Slovácko	56	(1)
2007–2009	Sigma Olomouc	35	(1)

Managerial career
- 2012–2013: Zeta
- 2015: Sigma Olomouc (asst.)
- 2018–2019: Znojmo (asst.)
- 2021: iClinic Sereď (asst.)
- 2022–2024: Slovácko B (asst.)
- 2024–2025: Slovácko B
- 2025: Slovácko (asst.)
- 2026: Hanácká Slavia Kroměříž (asst.)
- 2026: Hanácká Slavia Kroměříž
- * Club domestic league appearances and goals as of 17 July 2009

Darko Šuškavčević (born 28 April 1974) is a Montenegrin retired football defender. Besides Montenegro, he has played in the Czech Republic and Greece.

== Club career ==
Born in Titograd, he moved to the Czech Republic in 2000 to play for Slavia Prague, Slovácko and Sigma Olomouc.

== Managerial career ==
Šuškavčević was replaced by Mladen Vukićević as manager of Zeta in April 2013. He received his UEFA-A coaching licence in May 2013. He later was assistant manager at Sigma Olomouc and followed manager Leoš Kalvoda as he took up the same position at Znojmo in February 2018. He was dismissed alongside manager František Šturma in May 2019.

On 16 June 2026, Šuškavčević was appointed manager of SK Hanácká Slavia Kroměříž.
