= Dušan Vlaisavljević =

Montenegrin football manager and player

Personal information
- Date of birth: 5 February 1961 (age 65)
- Place of birth: Titograd, PR Montenegro, FPR Yugoslavia
- Position: Defender

Youth career
- Budućnost Titograd

Senior career*
Years	Team	Apps	(Gls)
1982–1986	Budućnost Titograd	116	(3)
1986–1987	Čelik Zenica	32	(0)
1987–1988	Hajduk Split	26	(0)
1988–1991	Rad	90	(6)
1991–1992	Zemun	30	(2)
1992–1993	Mogren	26	(1)
1993–1998	Budućnost Podgorica	154	(3)
1998–2000	Mogren	25	(0)
Total		499	(15)

Managerial career
- 2007–2014: Montenegro U21
- 2015: Zeta
- 2015: Grbalj
- 2016–2017: Zeta
- 2017–2018: Kom
- 2018: Zeta
- 2019: Grbalj
- 2020: Lovćen
- 2020–2021: Berane
- 2021: Cetinje
- 2023-2024: Rudar Pljevlja
- * Club domestic league appearances and goals

Dušan Vlaisavljević (Serbian Cyrillic: Душан Влаисављевић; born 5 February 1961) is a Montenegrin football manager and former player.

== Playing career ==
Vlaisavljević spent four seasons at Budućnost Titograd from 1982 to 1986, amassing 116 games and scoring three goals in the Yugoslav First League. He subsequently played for Čelik Zenica (1986–87) and Hajduk Split (1987–88). In 1988, Vlaisavljević moved to fellow First League side Rad, making 90 appearances and netting six goals in the top flight over the next three seasons.

After the breakup of Yugoslavia, Vlaisavljević returned to Montenegro and played with Mogren in the 1992–93 season. He then rejoined Budućnost Podgorica in 1993, spending the next five years at his parent club. Between 1998 and 2000, Vlaisavljević played two more seasons for Mogren in the First League of FR Yugoslavia.

== Managerial career ==
In February 2007, Vlaisavljević was named as the inaugural manager of the Montenegro national under-21 team. He left the position after his contract expired in December 2014.

== Career statistics ==
Club	Season	League	
Club	Season	Apps	Goals
Budućnost Titograd	1982–83	25	0
Budućnost Titograd	1983–84	27	0
Budućnost Titograd	1984–85	32	1
Budućnost Titograd	1985–86	32	2
Budućnost Titograd	Total	116	3
Čelik Zenica	1986–87	32	0
Hajduk Split	1987–88	26	0
Rad	1988–89	26	1
Rad	1989–90	30	1
Rad	1990–91	34	4
Rad	Total	90	6
Zemun	1991–92	30	2
Mogren	1992–93	26	1
Budućnost Podgorica	1993–94	32	2
Budućnost Podgorica	1994–95	33	1
Budućnost Podgorica	1995–96	29	0
Budućnost Podgorica	1996–97	30	0
Budućnost Podgorica	1997–98	30	0
Budućnost Podgorica	Total	154	3
Mogren	1998–99	7	0
Mogren	1999–2000	18	0
Mogren	Total	25	0
Career total		499	15
