= Vojvoda Malesija =

Montenegrin footballer and manager (1970–2021)

Personal information
- Date of birth: 17 July 1970
- Place of birth: Mojkovac, Montenegro, Yugoslavia
- Date of death: 24 December 2021 (aged 51)
- Place of death: Podgorica, Montenegro
- Height: 1.80 m (5 ft 11 in)
- Position: Forward

Senior career*
| Years | Team | Apps | (Gls) |
- Javor Ivanjica
- Polimlje
- Jedinstvo Bijelo Polje
- Budućnost Podgorica
| 1996–1999 | Zeta | 78 | (33) |
| 1999–2000 | Radnički Niš | 33 | (13) |
| 2000 | Uralan Elista | 9 | (0) |
| 2001 | Radnički Niš | 17 | (3) |
| 2001–2004 | Zeta | 65 | (12) |
- Radnički Beograd

Managerial career
- 2006–2007: Zeta (assistant)
- Blue Stars Podgorica
- 2009–2021: Zeta (assistant)
- * Club domestic league appearances and goals

Vojvoda Malesija (Cyrillic: Војвода Малесија; 17 July 1970 – 24 December 2021) was a Montenegrin football manager and player.

== Playing career ==
After a playing career that included playing in several top league domestic clubs such as FK Jedinstvo Bijelo Polje, FK Javor Ivanjica, FK Zeta, FK Radnički Niš and FK Radnički Beograd, and also with Russian Premier League club FC Uralan Elista, he retired and became a coach.

== Managerial career ==
Since summer 2009, he has been the main coach of FK Zeta, now playing in the Montenegrin First League.

== Personal life and death ==
Malesija died on 24 December 2021, at the age of 51. His daughter Tanja Malesija plays for the Montenegro women's national youth team.
