= Radosav Bulić =

Montenegrin footballer

Personal information
- Date of birth: 2 January 1977 (age 49)
- Place of birth: Pljevlja, SFR Yugoslavia
- Height: 1.78 m (5 ft 10 in)
- Position: Midfielder

Senior career*
Years	Team	Apps	(Gls)
1993–1995	Berane		
1995–1998	Rudar Pljevlja		
1998–2000	Sartid Smederevo	67	(4)
2001	Zvezdara		
2001–2002	Red Star Belgrade	4	(0)
2002–2003	Legia Warsaw	0	(0)
2003	→ Radnički Obrenovac (loan)	12	(0)
2003–2004	Sartid Smederevo		
2004–2005	Rubin Kazan	1	(0)
2005	→ Spartak Chelyabinsk (loan)	36	(1)
2006–2007	Voždovac	16	(0)
2007–2009	Rudar Pljevlja	31	(0)
2009–2011	Berane	14+	(1+)
2011–2012	Ibar Rožaje		

Managerial career
- 2024: Rudar Pljevlja
- * Club domestic league appearances and goals

Radosav Bulić (Serbian Cyrillic: Радосав Булић; born 2 January 1977) is a Montenegrin retired footballer who played as a midfielder.

== Club career ==
He started playing with his hometown club FK Rudar Pljevlja before moving to FK Sartid 1913 that would consequently lead him to sign with Serbian giants Red Star Belgrade. He also played with FK Radnički Obrenovac before moving to Russia where he played with FC Rubin Kazan and FC Spartak Chelyabinsk.

After leaving Russia, he played one season with FK Voždovac in the Serbian SuperLiga, before returning to Montenegro in 2008, and has represented Rudar and FK Berane in the Montenegrin First League. In summer 2011 he joined FK Ibar in the Montenegrin Second League.

After retiring from his active playing career, he became a players manager. He was the manager of the Montenegrin international footballer Janko Simović when he signed in March 2012 with Ukrainian FC Dynamo Kyiv.

His original name is Radosav, although numerous non-local sources usually misspell his name as Radoslav.

== Honors ==
Zvezdara

- Second League of FR Yugoslavia: 2000–01
