= Miodrag Martać =

Serbian football manager and player

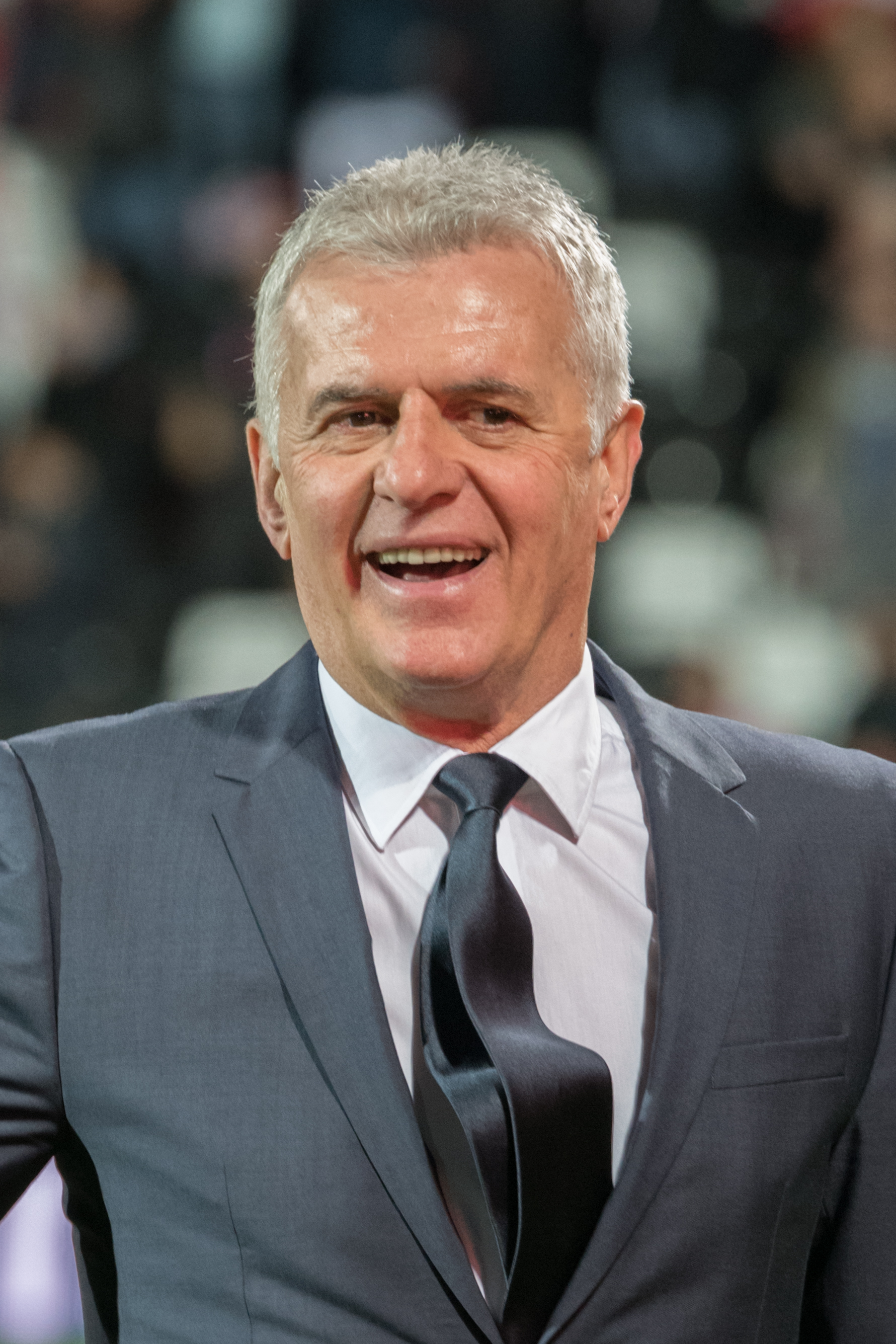
- Martać in 2018

Personal information
- Date of birth: 7 June 1959 (age 67)
- Place of birth: Raška, PR Serbia, FPR Yugoslavia
- Position: Midfielder

Youth career
- Bane

Senior career*
Years	Team	Apps	(Gls)
1978–1982	Trepča	112	(22)
1982–1987	Budućnost Titograd	115	(19)
1987–1990	Karşıyaka	88	(13)
1990–1991	Sutjeska Nikšić	10	(0)
Total		325	(54)

International career
1980	Kosovo	1	(1)

Managerial career
- 2002–2003: Serbia and Montenegro U17
- 2003–2004: Serbia and Montenegro U19
- 2004–2006: Zemun
- 2007: Red Star Belgrade (assistant)
- 2009–2010: Borac Čačak
- 2012: Sloga Kraljevo
- 2015: Zeta
- 2018: Serbia Women
- * Club domestic league appearances and goals

Miodrag Martać (Serbian Cyrillic: Миодраг Мартаћ; born 7 June 1959) is a Serbian football manager and former player.

== Club career ==
Martać played four seasons for Trepča in the Yugoslav Second League between 1978 and 1982. He then spent five seasons with Budućnost Titograd, making 115 appearances and scoring 19 goals in the Yugoslav First League from 1982 to 1987.

In 1987, Martać moved abroad and joined Turkish side Karşıyaka, spending the next three seasons with the club. He later returned to Yugoslavia and briefly played for Sutjeska Nikšić, before retiring.

== International career ==
Martać made one appearance for Kosovo on 31 July 1980, scoring Kosovo's second goal in the 2–2 draw against Yugoslavia.

== Managerial career ==
After hanging up his boots, Martać served as manager of several clubs, most notably Zemun.

== Career statistics ==
=== International ===
Appearances and goals by national team and year
National team	Year	Apps	Goals
Kosovo	1980	1	1
Total		1	1

Scores and results list Kosovo's goal tally first, score column indicates score after each Martać goal.

List of international goals scored by Miodrag Martać
No.	Date	Venue	Cap	Opponent	Score	Result	Competition	Ref.
1.	31 July 1980	Pristina, SAP Kosovo, SFR Yugoslavia	1	Yugoslavia	2–2	2–2	Friendly	
