= FK Zeta =

Montenegrin association football club

Zeta
- Full name: Fudbalski klub Zeta
- Nickname: Vukovi (The Wolves)
- Short name: ZET
- Founded: 1927; 99 years ago
- Ground: Stadion Trešnjica
- Capacity: 2,100
- Chairman: Dragan Popović
- Manager: Dragoljub Đuretić
- League: Montenegrin Second League
- 2026–27: Montenegrin Second League
- Website: fk-zeta.me
Home colours	Away colours

FK Zeta is a professional football club from Golubovci, seat of the Zeta Municipality of Montenegro. It plays in the Montenegrin Third League. The club was the inaugural champion of the Montenegrin First League in 2006–07 season.

== History ==
=== Period 1927-1997 ===
The club was formed in 1927 under the name FK Danica. During the first decades, they played only non-league matches. From 1947, the club played under the name FK Napredak, and since 1955, the team is playing under the name FK Zeta.

Until the start of the 1970s, FK Zeta played at lowest-rank competitions. First significant success, team from Golubovci made at season 1971–72 with promotion to Montenegrin Republic League. In that, third-level competition in SFR Yugoslavia, FK Zeta spent most of their seasons in following two decades, with greatest result as a second-places team at the end of seasons 1974–75, 1975–76, 1982–83 and 1983–84, but without success to gain a promotion to Yugoslav Second League. At season 1982–83, championship derby FK Berane – FK Zeta attended 10,000 spectators, which was a record attendance in Montenegrin Republic League until the 1999 game FK Jezero – FK Gusinje.

Until the middle of the 1990s, except in Republic League, FK Zeta also played few seasons in Fourth League – Center.

=== Period 1997-2006 ===
Successful era in FK Zeta history started at season 1997–98. The team won their first champion title in Montenegrin Republic League and secured first promotion to Yugoslav Second League. On their debut in Second League, FK Zeta won fourth place, but historical success come one season later (1999–2000). After hard struggle with Mladost Lučani, team from Golubovci won the title and gained promotion to First Yugoslav League.

Historical first game in the First League, Zeta played at 12 August 2000 against Milicionar (4:0) in Golubovci. That game at Trešnica stadium was attended by 5,000 supporters. FK Zeta spent six consecutive seasons in Yugoslav First League, often placed at the upper-half of championship table. With FK Zeta promotion to First League, new local rivalry was born – against Budućnost from neighbouring Podgorica.

Zeta made many successful results in the First League, and among them were often victories against two strongest sides – Partizan and Red Star. Except that, FK Zeta became the strongest Montenegrin team in First League at most of the seasons in period 2000–2006.

Highest final placement in top-division of Serbia and Montenegro, Zeta made on season 2004–05. They finished third and qualified for first performance in European competitions. On debut, Zeta was defeated at 2005–06 UEFA Cup second leg, against Bosnian side Široki Brijeg.

Additionally, at the same time, Zeta started producing notable young talent like Miloš Marić who transferred to Greek club Olympiacos in the summer of 2004, as well as brothers Bojan and Nenad Brnović, and Branimir Petrović who were all signed by Partizan, and more recently Milanko Rašković and Nikola Trajković who transferred to Red Star Belgrade.

=== Period 2006-present ===
Following Montenegrin independence, FK Zeta participated in the first Montenegrin First League season (2006–07) and became the league's first winners. The following season saw Montenegrin clubs allocated separate European qualifying berths - Zeta thus became the first Montenegrin club to participate in qualification for the UEFA Champions League. Zeta never reclaimed the Montenegrin First League since their 2006–07 triumph; participation in European competition since then was achieved on several occasions through top 4 league finishes.

The 2012–13 season saw Zeta make history by becoming the first Montenegrin club to navigate two rounds of European qualifying in one season; they also navigated past the third qualifying round of the UEFA Europa League by beating FK Sarajevo from Bosnia and Herzegovina, before losing in the play-off round to PSV Eindhoven. This remains the best performance by a Montenegrin club in a European competition.

=== First League Record ===
For the first time, FK Zeta played in Yugoslav First League on season 2000–01. Below is a list of FK Zeta scores in First League by every single season.

Season	Pos	G	W	D	L	GF	GA
2000–01	13	34	11	9	14	38	50
2001–02	5	34	15	7	12	48	50
2002–03	8	34	15	6	13	51	43
2003–04	11	30	10	6	14	38	41
2004–05	3	30	18	5	7	52	30
2005–06	5	30	14	5	11	42	36
2006–07	1	33	25	4	4	65	18
2007–08	2	33	19	9	5	56	28
2008–09	9	33	13	7	13	36	41
2009–10	4	33	17	6	10	43	33
2010–11	4	33	12	3	8	36	29
2011–12	3	33	17	9	7	55	40
2012–13	8	33	8	13	12	43	45
2013–14	8	33	12	4	17	39	57
2014–15	9	33	11	7	15	48	44
2015–16	8	33	10	8	15	37	42
2016–17	2	33	19	6	8	38	17
2017–18	6	36	12	13	11	40	35
2018–19	3	36	16	13	7	36	21
2019–20	4	31	9	14	8	29	30
2020–21	6	36	13	7	16	34	41
2021–22	10	36	8	10	18	36	52

Seasons with green background were played in the first league of Yugoslavia or Serbia and Montenegro, together with Serbian clubs.

=== FK Zeta in European competitions ===
For the first time, FK Zeta played in European competitions on season 2005–06. Until now, they played ten seasons in European cups, their most successful campaign being in 2012–13, when Zeta reached the play-off round of Europa League.

Season	Competition	Round	Opponent	Home	Away	Aggregate
2005–06	UEFA Cup	2QR	(Bosnia and Herzegovina) Široki Brijeg	0–1	1–4	1–5
2006–07	Intertoto Cup	2QR	(Slovenia) Maribor	1–2	0–2	1–4
2007–08	UEFA Champions League	1QR	(Lithuania) FBK Kaunas	3–1	2–3	5–4
2007–08	UEFA Champions League	2QR	(Scotland) Rangers	0–1	0–2	0–3
2008–09	UEFA Cup	1QR	(Slovenia) Interblock Ljubljana	1–1	0–1	1–2
2010–11	UEFA Europa League	1QR	(Moldova) Dacia Chişinău	1–1	0–0	1–1 (a)
2011–12	UEFA Europa League	1QR	(Slovakia) Spartak Trnava	2–1	0–3	2–4
2012–13	UEFA Europa League	1QR	(Armenia) Pyunik	1–2	3–0	4–2
2012–13	UEFA Europa League	2QR	(Finland) JJK Jyväskylä	1–0	2–3	3–3 (a)
2012–13	UEFA Europa League	3QR	(Bosnia and Herzegovina) FK Sarajevo	1–0	1–2	2–2 (a)
2012–13	UEFA Europa League	PO	(Netherlands) PSV Eindhoven	0–5	0–9	0–14
2017–18	UEFA Europa League	1QR	(Bosnia and Herzegovina) Željezničar Sarajevo	2–2	0–1	2–3
2019–20	UEFA Europa League	1QR	(Hungary) Fehérvár	1–5	0–0	1–5
2020–21	UEFA Europa League	PR	(Andorra) Engordany	3–1		
2020–21	UEFA Europa League	1QR	(Luxembourg) Progrès Niederkorn	0–3		

== Honours and achievements ==
- Montenegrin First League – 1
  - winners (1): 2006–07
  - runner-up (2): 2007–08, 2016–17
- Second Yugoslav League – 1
  - winners (1):1999–00
- Montenegrin Republic League – 1
  - winners (1): 1997–98
- Montenegrin Republic Cup – 2
  - winners (2): 1998–99, 1999–00

== Players ==
=== Current squad ===
As of 26 September 2025

Note: Flags indicate national team as defined under FIFA eligibility rules; some limited exceptions apply. Players may hold more than one non-FIFA nationality.

No.	Pos.	Nation	Player
2	MF	JPN	Yu Horike
4	DF	MNE	Stefan Radović
5	DF	MNE	Zvonko Ceklić
6	MF	MNE	Srđan Krstović (captain)
7	MF	JPN	Shiden Nakazawa
8	DF	MNE	Djordjije Vukčević
9	FW	MNE	Balša Radusinović
10	MF	JPN	Ryo Tachibana
11	MF	MNE	Balša Goranović
12	GK	MNE	Aleksandar Karadzic
15	MF	MNE	Simo Popović
17	DF	MNE	Stefan Krstović
18	MF	MNE	Vojislav Šišević
19	DF	MNE	Janko Simović
20	FW	MNE	Igor Kukulicic

No.	Pos.	Nation	Player
22	FW	MNE	Alden Škrijelj
23	DF	MNE	Amel Tuzović
25	MF	MNE	Jovan Đukić
26	DF	MNE	Andrej Pupovic
28	MF	JPN	Masato Shimokawa
30	DF	MNE	Nemanja Djurovic
32	GK	SRB	Rajko Boljević
36	MF	MNE	Đorđe Tripunović
39	DF	MNE	Vaso Peličić
70	MF	MNE	Nikola Matanović
90	FW	MNE	Balša Rogošić
—	GK	MNE	Vidoje Popovic
—	MF	MNE	Danijel Bečić
—	FW	MNE	Vasilije Klikovac
—	FW	MNE	Mijat Lambulic

=== Notable players ===
For the list of former and current players with Wikipedia article, please see Category:FK Zeta players.
Below is the list of FK Zeta players which made international careers or played for national teams of their countries.

- (Montenegro) Zoran Batrović
- (Montenegro) Darko Šuškavčević
- (Montenegro) Radoslav Batak
- (Montenegro) Nikola Krstović
- (Brazil) Cadú
- (Brazil) Danilo Goiano
- (Brazil) Sávio
- (Serbia) Miloš Marić
- (Serbia) Nikola Trajković
- (Serbia) Petar Puača
- (Serbia) Ajazdin Nuhi
- (Montenegro) Nenad Brnović
- (Montenegro) Bojan Brnović
- (Montenegro) Miodrag Vukotić
- (Montenegro) Mladen Lambulić
- (Serbia) Branislav Vukomanović
- (Montenegro) (Serbia) Malesija Vojvoda
- (Serbia) Mitar Peković
- (Montenegro) Milan Roganović
- (Montenegro) Mladen Božović
- (Montenegro) Vladimir Boljević
- (Peru) Camilo Jimenez
- (Peru) Rodolfo Burger

== Historical list of coaches ==
- (Serbia and Montenegro) Rade Vešović
- (Serbia and Montenegro) Nikola Rakojević (2001–2003)
- (Montenegro) Dejan Vukićević (2003–2007)
- (Serbia) Slobodan Halilović (June 2007 – Aug 2007)
- (Montenegro) Mladen Vukićević (30 Aug 2007 – Oct 2008)
- (Montenegro) Dejan Roganović (Oct 2008 – Apr 2009)
- (Montenegro) Milan Đuretić (6 May 2009 – Jun 2009)
- (Montenegro) Velibor Matanović (Jul 2009 – Nov 2009)
- (Montenegro) Dragoljub Đuretić (12 nov 2009 – Aug 2010)
- (Montenegro) Dejan Vukićević (31 Aug 2010 – 2011)
- (Montenegro) Rade Vešović (2011 – Oct 2012)
- (Montenegro) Darko Šuškavčević (13 Oct 2012 – Apr 2013)
- (Montenegro) Mladen Vukićević (22 Apr 2013 – Mar 2014)
- (Montenegro) Rade Vešović (10 Mar 2014 – Sep 2014)
- (Montenegro) Mladen Lambulić (18 Sep 2014 – Apr 2015)
- (Montenegro) Dušan Vlaisavljević (15 Apr 2015 – Jun 2015)
- (Serbia) Miodrag Martać (Jul 2015 – Oct 2015)
- (Montenegro) Nenad Brnović (3 Oct 2015 – Nov 2015)
- (Montenegro) Dejan Vukićević (8 Nov 2015 – 2016)
- (Montenegro) Dušan Vlaisavljević (24 Dec 2016 – Jun 2017)
- (Montenegro) Dejan Roganović (Jul 2017 – Apr 2018)
- (Montenegro) Dragoljub Đuretić (5 Apr 2018 – 20 Jun 2018)
- (Montenegro) Dušan Vlaisavljević (20 Jun 2018 – Jul 2018)
- (Montenegro) Dragoljub Đuretić (2018 – 1 Feb 2019)
- (Montenegro) Dejan Roganović (5 Feb 2019 – 1 Jan 2021)
- (Montenegro) Dragoljub Đuretić (5 July 2021 – present)

== Stadium ==
FK Zeta home ground is Stadion Trešnjica which was built during 1996. Since then, the stadium has been renovated several times (last time in 2016) and near the main ground is another pitch with artificial turf.
FK Zeta has been playing First League games at Trešnjica stadium since 2000. The biggest crowd on a home game was 5,000 spectators in numerous occasions, especially during matches against Budućnost and, earlier, against Partizan and Red Star Belgrade.

== See also ==
- Golubovci
- Zeta Plain
- Podgorica
- Montenegrin Second League
- Montenegrin clubs in Yugoslav football competitions (1946–2006)
