= Stefan Đorđević (footballer, born 1990) =

Montenegrin footballer

Personal information
- Full name: Stefan Đorđević
- Date of birth: 16 November 1990 (age 35)
- Place of birth: SFR Yugoslavia
- Height: 1.93 m (6 ft 4 in)
- Position: Forward

Senior career*
Years	Team	Apps	(Gls)
2009–2010	Petrovac	6	(0)
2010–2011	Mogren	0	(0)
2013–2014	Lovćen	2	(1)
2014–2015	Grbalj	3	(1)
2015–2016	Jedinstvo Bijelo Polje	39	(11)
2017	Vojvodina	2	(0)
2017–2018	Petrovac	27	(7)
2018–2019	Grbalj	27	(7)
2019	Petrovac	14	(0)
- * Club domestic league appearances and goals as of 22 April 2017

Stefan Đorđević (born 10 September 1990) is a Montenegrin footballer, who most recently played for Petrovac.
