= FK Rudar Pljevlja =

Rudar Pljevlja
- Full name: Fudbalski klub Rudar Pljevlja
- Nickname: Rudari (The Miners)
- Short name: RUD
- Founded: 1920; 106 years ago
- Ground: Gradski stadion
- Capacity: 5,140
- Head coach: Nedeljko Vlahović
- League: Montenegrin Second League
- 2024–25: Montenegrin Second League, 2nd of 9
- Website: https://fkrudarpljevlja.me/
Home colours	Away colours

FK Rudar Pljevlja, commonly known as Rudar Pljevlja or simply Rudar, is a football club based in Pljevlja, Montenegro. It currently plays in the Montenegrin Second League, the country's second tier.

Rudar have played in the First League since its inception in 2006, and won two league titles in 2009–10 and 2014–15. The club have been the strongest in the Montenegrin Cup, with three triumphs, one runner-up position and two semi-final finishes in the tournament's six seasons.

== History ==
Rudar (Miner) was founded in 1920 as Breznik, renaming itself Sandžak three years later. The team was aided by members of the 48th Infantry Regiment, who stationed in the town. The club was renamed again after World War II as FK Jedinstvo, but only until another renaming in 1947 in honour of chairman Velimir Jakić. That same year club reached the quarter-finals of the Yugoslav Cup where they were eliminated by top-flight FK Sarajevo 3–2 after extra time. In 1955, the club settled on their current name.

=== First League Record ===
For the first time, FK Rudar played in First League of FR Yugoslavia in season 1993–94. Below is a list of FK Rudar scores in First League by every single season.

Season	Pos	G	W	D	L	GF	GA
1993–94	13	36	15	10	11	36	26
1994–95	20	36	7	9	20	29	56
1997–98	20	33	13	4	16	44	54
2001–02	7	34	13	8	13	35	33
2002–03	17	34	4	6	24	19	62
2006–07	4	33	14	5	14	37	32
2007–08	5	33	14	10	9	38	26
2008–09	5	33	12	5	16	39	37
2009–10	1	33	22	5	6	56	26
2010–11	3	33	16	7	10	44	29
2011–12	2	33	23	8	2	60	20
2012–13	5	33	15	6	12	42	40
2013–14	6	33	11	9	13	32	31
2014–15	1	33	22	6	5	58	18
2015–16	3	33	16	10	7	39	26
2016–17	8	33	11	9	13	35	31
2017–18	5	36	13	10	13	32	28
2018–19	8	36	8	17	11	35	44
2019–20	7	31	10	5	16	38	57
2020–21	7	36	13	6	17	38	50
2021–22	8	36	9	9	18	35	56
2022–23	9	36	9	11	16	36	51
2023–24	10	36	7	6	23	25	54

Seasons with green background were played in the first league of Yugoslavia or Serbia and Montenegro, together with Serbian clubs.

=== FK Rudar in European competitions ===
For the first time, FK Rudar played in European competitions on season 2007–08. Until now, they played eight seasons in European cups.

- Q= Qualifying

Season	Competition	Round	Club	Home	Away	Agg.
2007–08	2007–08 UEFA Cup	1QR	(Cyprus) Omonia	0–2	0–2	0–4
2010-11	2010–11 UEFA Champions League	1QR	(San Marino) Tre Fiori	4–1	3–0	7–1
2010-11	2010–11 UEFA Champions League	2QR	(Bulgaria) Litex Lovech	0–4	0–1	0–5
2011-12	2011-12 UEFA Europa League	2QR	Austria Wien	0–3	0–2	0–5
2012-13	2012-13 UEFA Europa League	1QR	(Armenia) Shirak	0–1	1–1	1–2
2013-14	2013-14 UEFA Europa League	1QR	(Armenia) Mika	1–0	1–1	2–1
2013-14	2013-14 UEFA Europa League	2QR	(Poland) Śląsk Wrocław	2–2	0–4	2–6
2015-16	2015–16 UEFA Champions League	1QR	(Azerbaijan) Qarabağ	0–1	0–0	0–1
2016-17	2016-17 UEFA Europa League	1QR	(Albania) Kukësi	0–1	1–1	1–2
2018-19	2018–19 UEFA Europa League	1QR	(Serbia) Partizan	0–3	0–3	0–6

==== European record ====
Competition	Matches	W	D	L	GF	GA
UEFA Champions League	6	2	1	3	7	7
UEFA Cup/UEFA Europa League	9	1	2	6	3	16
Total	15	3	3	9	10	23

== Honours and achievements ==
- Montenegrin First League – 2
  - winners (2): 2009–10, 2014–15
  - runners-up (1): 2011–12
- Montenegrin Cup – 4
  - winners (4): 2006–07, 2009–10, 2010–11, 2015–16
  - runners-up (1): 2011–12
- Second League of Serbia and Montenegro – 1
  - winners (2): 2000–01, 2005–06
- Montenegrin Republic League – 2
  - winners (2): 1957–58, 1965–66
  - runners-up (5): 1956–57, 1966–67, 1968–69, 1970–71, 1971–72
- Montenegrin Republic Cup – 2
  - winners (2): 1947–48, 2000–01

== Players ==
=== Current squad ===
As of 9 October 2025

Note: Flags indicate national team as defined under FIFA eligibility rules; some limited exceptions apply. Players may hold more than one non-FIFA nationality.

No.	Pos.	Nation	Player
3	DF	MNE	Ognjen Kasalica
5	MF	NGA	Musa Yahaya
6	DF	MNE	Andrija Pupović
7	MF	MNE	Vuk Popović
8	MF	MNE	Stefan Vukčević
9	FW	MNE	Stefan Golubović
10	MF	MNE	Damir Kojašević
11	FW	MNE	Đorđe Magdelinić
12	GK	MNE	Milislav Vuksanović
17	FW	MKD	Antonio Bozhinoski
18	MF	MNE	Vojin Pavlović
19	MF	MNE	Nemanja Radević
20	FW	MNE	Balša Globarević

No.	Pos.	Nation	Player
21	MF	MNE	Damjan Radulović
23	DF	MNE	Andrija Pupović
25	MF	MNE	Veljko Radenović
30	DF	SRB	Andrija Pupović
31	GK	MNE	Balsa Radanovic
55	GK	MNE	Suad Bečović
52	FW	NED	Damir Mustafa Đulović
98	DF	MNE	Ognjen Kasalica

=== Notable players ===
Below is the list of former Rudar players who represented their countries at the full international level.

- (Serbia and Montenegro) Damir Čakar
- (Serbia and Montenegro) Dragoslav Jevrić
- (Serbia and Montenegro) Žarko Lučić
- (Serbia and Montenegro) (Montenegro) Dragan Bogavac
- (Montenegro) Vladan Adžić
- (Montenegro) Miloš Bakrač
- (Montenegro) Srđan Blažić
- (Montenegro) Draško Božović
- (Montenegro) Radomir Đalović
- (Montenegro) Ivan Fatić
- (Montenegro) Blažo Igumanović
- (Montenegro) Igor Ivanović
- (Montenegro) Ivan Ivanović
- (Montenegro) Branislav Janković
- (Montenegro) Miroje Jovanović
- (Montenegro) Vasko Kalezić
- (Montenegro) Edvin Kuč
- (Montenegro) Slobodan Lakićević
- (Montenegro) Milan Mijatović
- (Montenegro) Nemanja Mijušković
- (Montenegro) Stefan Milošević
- (Montenegro) Nemanja Sekulić
- (Montenegro) Janko Simović
- (Montenegro) Nedeljko Vlahović
- (Bulgaria) Predrag Pažin
- (Cyprus) Siniša Dobrašinović
- (Serbia) Bojan Šaranov
- (Togo) Elom Nya-Vedji

For the list of former and current players with Wikipedia article, please see Category:FK Rudar Pljevlja players.

== Coaching staff ==
Position	Staff
Head coach	(Serbia) Dragan Aničić
Assistant coach	
Goalkeeping coach	(Montenegro) Miloš Radanović
Economic	(Montenegro) Muhamed Gerina
Physical fitness coach	

== Historical list of coaches ==
- (Socialist Federal Republic of Yugoslavia) Miljan Ašanin (1947)
- (Socialist Federal Republic of Yugoslavia) Remzo Nuhanović (1948 - 1949)
- (Socialist Federal Republic of Yugoslavia) Bećir Durutlić (1950)
- (Socialist Federal Republic of Yugoslavia) Franjo Pazmanj (1953)
- (Socialist Federal Republic of Yugoslavia) Petar Purić (1954)
- (Socialist Federal Republic of Yugoslavia) Faruk Kadić (1954)
- (Socialist Federal Republic of Yugoslavia) Sveto Čubrilović (1958)
- (Socialist Federal Republic of Yugoslavia) Drago Ivanović (1959 - 1962)
- (Socialist Federal Republic of Yugoslavia) Boris Marović (1962)
- (Socialist Federal Republic of Yugoslavia) Radojica Radojičić (1964 - 1965)
- (Socialist Federal Republic of Yugoslavia) Vlatko Vujošević (1965)
- (Socialist Federal Republic of Yugoslavia) Uglješa Rakočević (1965)
- (Socialist Federal Republic of Yugoslavia) Mirko Žderić (1965 - 1966)
- (Socialist Federal Republic of Yugoslavia) Božo Dedović (1972)
- (Socialist Federal Republic of Yugoslavia) Karlo Zapušek (1976 - 1977)
- (Socialist Federal Republic of Yugoslavia) Karlo Zapušek (1982)
- (Socialist Federal Republic of Yugoslavia) Rasim Čakar (1985)
- (Socialist Federal Republic of Yugoslavia) Božidar Pajević (1987 - 1988)
- (Socialist Federal Republic of Yugoslavia) Rajko Milović (1988 - 1989)
- (Socialist Federal Republic of Yugoslavia) Hasan Ćirlija (1989 - 1991)
- (Socialist Federal Republic of Yugoslavia) Branislav Milačić (1991)
- (Socialist Federal Republic of Yugoslavia) Dragan Aničić (1992)
- (Serbia and Montenegro) Vlado Milosavljević (1992)
- (Serbia and Montenegro) Dragan Šaković (1992–1993)
- (Serbia and Montenegro) Drago Kovačević (1993)
- (Serbia and Montenegro) Nikola Rakojević (1993–1994)
- (Serbia and Montenegro) Momčilo Vujačić (1994)
- (Serbia and Montenegro) Zoran Vraneš (1994)
- (Serbia and Montenegro) Drago Kovačević (1995)
- (Serbia and Montenegro) Danilo Vukićević (1995)
- (Serbia and Montenegro) Boris Marović (1995)
- (Serbia and Montenegro) Nikola Rakojević (1995–1996)
- (Serbia and Montenegro) Dragan Šaković (1996–1997)
- (Bosnia and Herzegovina) Jusuf Čizmić (1997)
- (Serbia and Montenegro) Danilo Vukićević (1997–1998)
- (Bosnia and Herzegovina) Srđan Bajić (1998 – 2002)
- (Serbia and Montenegro) Rade Vesović (2002)
- (Serbia and Montenegro) Goran Milojević (2002 - 2003)
- (Serbia and Montenegro) Zoran Vraneš (2003 - 2004)
- (Montenegro) Mirko Marić (2006 – May 2008)
- (Montenegro) Branislav Milačić (4 May 2008 - Jun 2008)
- (Serbia) Ivan Adžić (Jul 2008 – Mar 2009)
- (Montenegro) Mirko Marić (19 Mar 2009 – Apr 2009)
- (Montenegro) Miodrag Radanović (18 Apr 2009 - Jun 2009)
- (Serbia) Nebojša Vignjević (Jul 2009 – Jun 2011)
- (Montenegro) Dragan Radojičić (Jul 2011 – Jun 2012)
- (Montenegro) Nikola Rakojević (6 Jul 2012 – Jun 2013)
- (Montenegro) Mirko Marić (12 Jun 2013 – Mar 2016)
- (Bosnia and Herzegovina) Srđan Bajić (14 Mar 2016 - May 2016)
- (Montenegro) Vuko Bogavac (16 May 2016 - 23 May 2016)
- (Montenegro) Dragan Radojičić (23 May 2016 - Aug 2016)
- (Montenegro) Mirko Marić (Aug 2016 - Feb 2017)
- (Serbia) Milan Lešnjak (Feb 2017 - May 2017)
- (Montenegro) Radislav Dragićević (May 2017 - Sep 2018)
- (Montenegro) Miodrag Vukotić (Sep 2017 - Jun 2018)
- (Montenegro) Vuko Bogavac (Jul 2018 - Aug 2018)
- (Bosnia and Herzegovina) Edis Mulalić (Aug 2018 - Jan 2019)
- (Montenegro) Nenad Vukčević (Feb 2019 - Jun 2019)
- (Bosnia and Herzegovina) Edis Mulalić (Jul 2019 - Jul 2020)
- (Montenegro) Vuko Bogavac (Aug 2020 – Jun 2021)
- (Serbia) Zoran Govedarica (Jun 2021 – Nov 2021)
- (Montenegro) Rade Petrović (Nov 2021 - Apr 2022)
- (Montenegro) Srđan Nikić (Apr 2022 - Sep 2022 )
- (Serbia) Dragan Aničić (Sep 2022 Jun 2023)
- (Montenegro) Dušan Vlaisavljević (Jul 2023 - Jul 2024)
- (Montenegro) Radosav Bulić (1 Jul 2024 - Oct 2024)
- (Montenegro) Vuko Bogavac (3 Oct 2024 - Apr 2025)
- (Montenegro) Mladen Lambulić (15 Apr 2025 - Jun 2025)
- (Montenegro) Nikola Sekulić (18 Jul 2025 -)

== Stadium ==
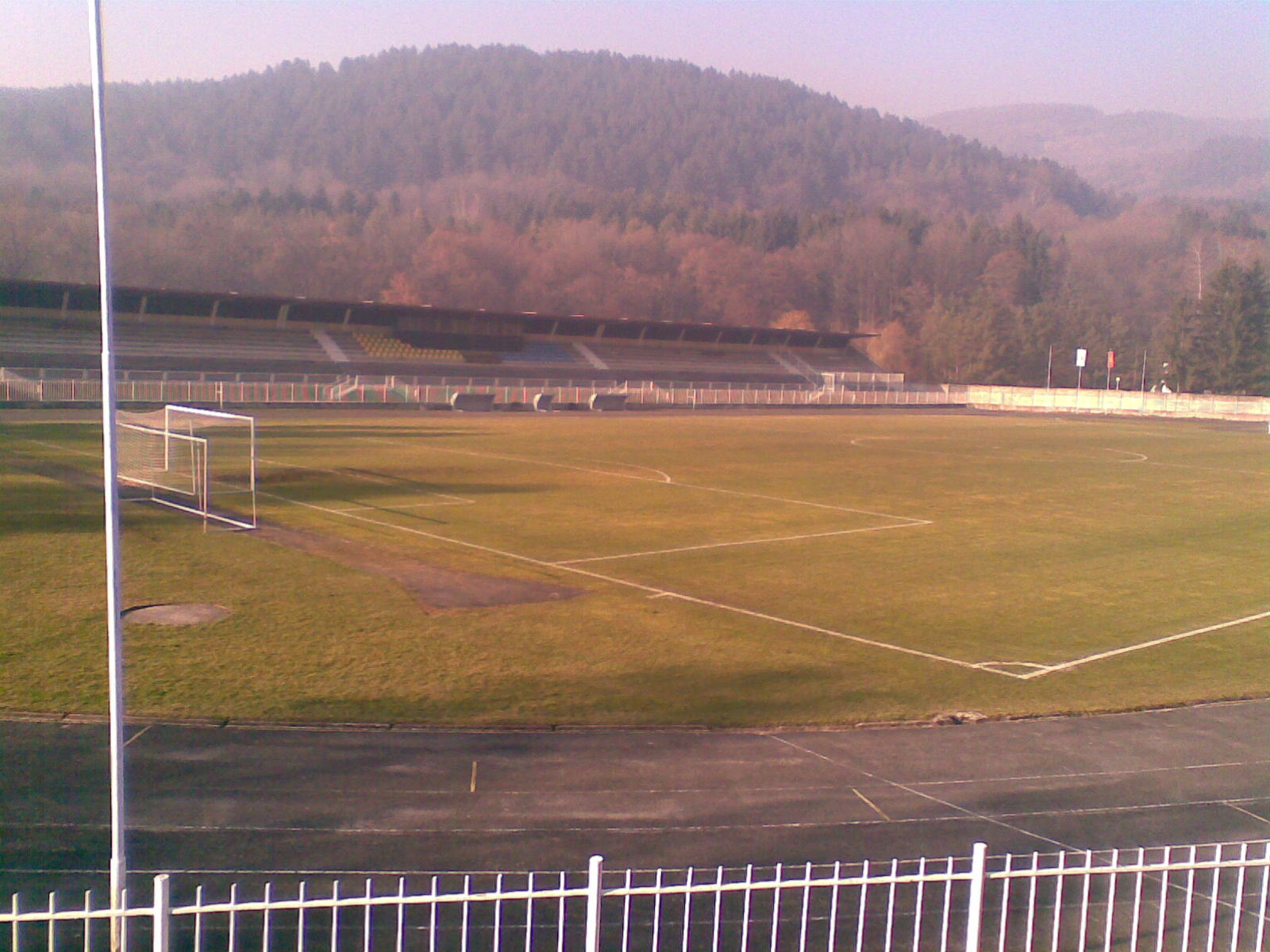
Rudar Pljevlja's stadium

Rudar plays at the Gradski stadion, a multi-use stadium including a complex of tennis, handball and basketball courts. It was built in 1948 and rebuilt in 1985. It has two stands and a current capacity of 5,140.

== See also ==
- Montenegrin First League
- Montenegrin clubs in Yugoslav football competitions (1946–2006)
- Fudbalski savez Crne Gore
