= FK Berane =

Berane
- Full name: Fudbalski klub Berane/Фудбалски клуб Беране
- Nickname: Plavo-bijeli (The Blue-Whites)
- Founded: 1920; 106 years ago
- Ground: Berane City Stadium
- Capacity: 7,466
- Chairman: Nenad Bulatović
- Manager: Goran Jovanović
- League: Montenegrin Second League
- 2024–25: Montenegrin Third League, 1st (promoted)
Home colours	Away colours

Fudbalski klub Berane (Cyrillic: Фудбалски клуб Беране) is a Montenegrin professional football club based in Berane. Established in 1920, the club plays in the Second League of Montenegro.

== History ==
FK Berane was founded in 1920, as one of the first football clubs in Northern Montenegro.

In the period before World War II, they were the most successful football team from the north. During the 1920s, as other neighbouring clubs mostly played friendlies, FK Berane participated in official competitions of Montenegro. Greatest season of that time was in 1928, when Berane played in the finals of Montenegrin Football Championship. Their opponent in the game for the trophy was FK Lovćen, who won with result 3–0. That was the best result of FK Berane before World War II.

After the war, city of Berane was renamed – the new name was Ivangrad. Due to that fact, a new name of football club was Ika Ivangrad. First significant success after World War II, the team made on season 1948–59, with their first-ever performance in Montenegrin Republic League. At 1949, the club was renamed again, so they started to play under the name Radnički Ivangrad. Biggest success in Montenegrin Republic League came in 1951 – Radnički Ivangrad won the title after the hard struggle with FK Sutjeska, but could not achieve promotion to the Second League. The most significant success in the decade came in 1955, when the team gained promotion to the Yugoslav Second League, where they spent only a single season.

In the beginning of the sixties, the club was presented as FK Ivangrad, but they didn't achieve any significant results until the start of the 1980s. Success came at season 1982–83, when Ivangrad won the title in the Montenegrin Republic League. Their home game against FK Zeta, who was their biggest rival during the season, was attended by 10,000 spectators, which was the all-time record of the Montenegrin Republic League.

Ivangrad finished 11th in the 1983–84 Yugoslav Second League. During the same season, for the first time in the history, the club won the Montenegrin Republic Cup. So, they played in the 1984–85 Yugoslav Cup, but were eliminated in the first stage against NK Osijek (1–3).

After five consecutive seasons in Yugoslav Second League, FK Ivangrad was relegated on season 1987–88. During the breakup of SFR Yugoslavia, the team was a member of third-tied competitions.

Following the change of the city name, from 1996, club is playing under the name FK Berane. On season 1996–97, they were first place in the Montenegrin Republic League, which gave them the opportunity to play in the 1997–98 Yugoslav Second League. FK Berane achieved a few significant results at that time, with sixth place in season 1997–98, but they were relegated after the 2000–2001 season.

Following Montenegrin independence in 2006, as a winner of the last edition of Montenegrin Republic League, FK Berane became a member of inaugural season of the Montenegrin First League. With a poor performance throughout the season, they finished as the last-placed team in the 2006–07 season. The best result in the Montenegrin Cup came at edition 2007–08, when they played against FK Budućnost, but didn't succeed to reach the final game (0–0, 0–4).

By now, FK Berane played four seasons in Prva CFL, but they always finished with relegations.

=== Evolution of name ===
Over the years, FK Berane they played under three names. Most of the period, they played under the name of the city (Berane/Ivangrad).

Period	Name	Full name
1920–1941	FK Berane	Fudbalski klub "Berane"
1945–1949	FK Ika	Fudbalski klub "Ika" Ivangrad
1949–1962	FK Radnički	Fudbalski klub "Radnički" Ivangrad
1962–1996	FK Ivangrad	Fudbalski klub "Ivangrad"
1996–present	FK Berane	Fudbalski klub "Berane"

=== First League Record ===
For the first time, FK Berane played in Montenegrin First League on season 2006–07. Below is a list of FK Berane scores in First League by every single season.

Season	Pos	G	W	D	L	GF	GA
2006–07	12	33	7	7	19	25	48
2009–10	11	33	8	6	19	28	49
2011–12	11	33	8	5	20	32	54
2014–15	12	33	3	4	26	25	78

== Honours and achievements ==
- Montenegrin Championship (1922–1940) – 0
  - runners-up (1): Autumn 1928
- Montenegrin Second League – 1
  - winners (1): 2008–09
  - runners-up (2): 2010–11, 2013–14
- Montenegrin Third League – North – 1
  - winners (1): 2024–25
- Montenegrin Republic League – 4
  - winners (4): 1951, 1982–83, 1996–97, 2005–06
- Montenegrin Republic Cup – 1
  - winners (1): 1983–84

== Players ==
=== Current squad ===
As of 20 May 2024

Note: Flags indicate national team as defined under FIFA eligibility rules; some limited exceptions apply. Players may hold more than one non-FIFA nationality.

No.	Pos.	Nation	Player
—	MF	MNE	Muljaz Adrović
—	GK	MNE	Zoran Aković
—	DF	MNE	Matija Anđić
—	GK	MNE	Filip Babović
—		MNE	Petar Barjaktarović
—	MF	BRA	Gabriel Barreto
—	MF	MNE	Uroš Bulatović
—	DF	MNE	Milan Celić
—	DF	BRA	Matheus do Ó
—	DF	MNE	Maksim Đukić
—	MF	MNE	Nikola Đukić
—	MF	MNE	Bogdan Korać
—		MNE	Viktor Kuč
—	DF	MNE	Matija Ivanović
—	FW	MNE	Mihailo Lončar

No.	Pos.	Nation	Player
—	FW	MNE	Đorđe Magdelinić
—	DF	MNE	Andrija Marsenić
—	MF	SRB	Vasilije Martinović
—	DF	MNE	Milan Mirković
—		MNE	Luka Obradović
—	FW	MNE	Vasilije Osmajlić
—	FW	MNE	Vladimir Popović
—	MF	MNE	Stefan Radojević
—		MNE	Imran Redžepagić
—	MF	MNE	Luka Rmuš
—	MF	MNE	Vasilije Šoškić
—	FW	MNE	Darjan Šušić
—	MF	MNE	Nemanja Tmušić
—	DF	MNE	Nikola Tmušić
—	FW	MNE	Vuk Vulević
—	MF	MNE	Muslija Juković

=== Notable players ===
For the list of former and current players with Wikipedia article, please see Category:FK Berane players.

Below is the list of former Berane players who represented their countries at the full international level.

- (Serbia and Montenegro) Dragoslav Jevrić
- (Montenegro) Edvin Kuč
- (Montenegro) Aleksandar Šćekić
- (Montenegro) Janko Simović

== Coaching history ==
- (Montenegro) Slobodan Đukić (Jul 2006 – Apr 2007)
- (Montenegro) Vojo Vujović (22 Apr 2007 – 2008)
- (Serbia) Dragan Lacmanović (Jun 2008 - Mar 2010)
- (Serbia) Predrag Pejović (30 Mar 2010 – Jun 2010)
- (Montenegro) Slobodan Đukić (Jul 2010 - Jun 2012)
- (Serbia) Slaviša Božičić (Jun 2013 – Nov 2013)
- (Montenegro) Novo Cimbaljević (15 Nov 2013 – Jan 2014)
- (Montenegro) Nebojša Jovović (25 Jan 2014 – Jun 2014)
- (Montenegro) Ratko Stevović (Jul 2014 – Oct 2014)
- (Montenegro) Rade Vešović (14 Oct 2014 – Aug 2015)
- (Montenegro) Slobodan Đukić (Nov 2018 – Jul 2020)
- (Montenegro) Dušan Vlaisavljević (Sep 2020 – 2021)

== Stadium ==
FK Berane plays their home games on Berane City Stadium. It's the largest stadium in Northern Montenegro, with capacity of 7,644 seats. Last renovation was completed in 2018, when the stadium got the modern stand with seats, roofs, dressing rooms and offices under UEFA standards.

== See also ==
- Berane City Stadium
- Berane
- Montenegrin First League
- Montenegrin Second League
- Montenegrin clubs in Yugoslav football competitions (1946–2006)
