= Dejan Vukićević =

Montenegrin football manager and player (born 1968)

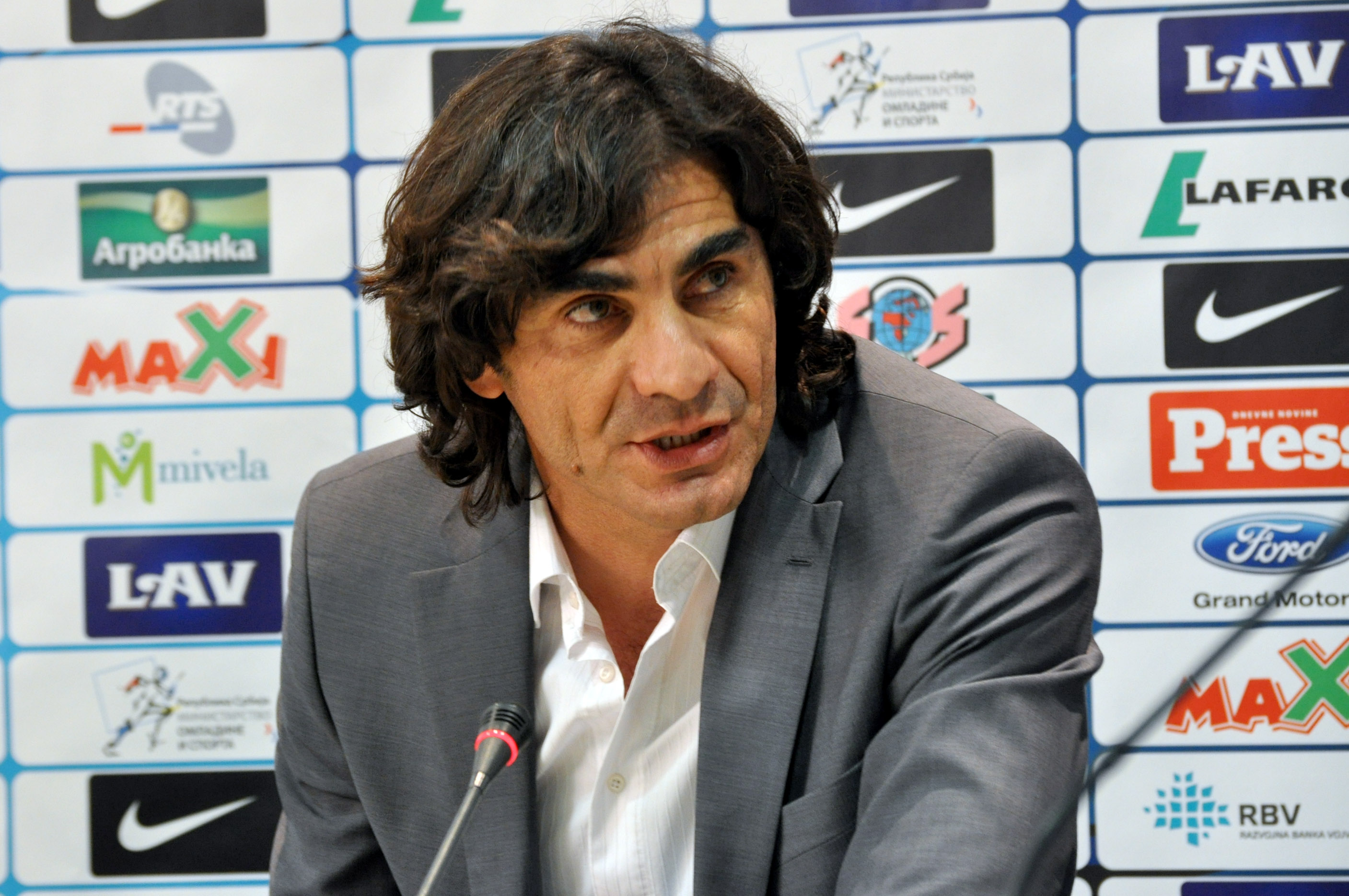
- Vukićević in 2012

Personal information
- Date of birth: 27 April 1968 (age 58)
- Place of birth: Titograd, SR Montenegro, SFR Yugoslavia
- Height: 1.84 m (6 ft 0 in)
- Position: Midfielder

Team information
- Current team: Budućnost Podgorica (manager)

Senior career*
Years	Team	Apps	(Gls)
1987–1992	Budućnost Titograd	79	(7)
1992–1993	Mogren	34	(5)
1993–1994	Pezoporikos	24	(2)
1994–1995	Radnički Beograd	47	(3)
1996–1997	Partizan	59	(13)
1998–1999	Sevilla	14	(0)
1999–2000	Recreativo	9	(0)
Total		266	(30)

Managerial career
- 2004–2006: Zeta
- 2007–2010: Mogren
- 2010–2011: Zeta
- 2011–2012: Vojvodina
- 2013: Borac Čačak
- 2014: Dacia Chișinău
- 2015–2016: Zeta
- 2017: Mladost Podgorica
- 2018–2019: Ventspils
- 2019: Feronikeli
- 2021: Laçi
- 2022: Laçi
- 2023–2024: Otrant-Olympic
- 2025-: Budućnost Podgorica
- * Club domestic league appearances and goals

Dejan Vukićević (Montenegrin: Дејан Вукићевић; born 27 April 1968) is a Montenegrin football manager and former player.

== Playing career ==
Vukićević started out at his hometown side Budućnost Titograd, making his senior debut in the 1987–88 season. He spent five years at the club, before switching to Mogren in 1992. The following year, Vukićević moved abroad to Cyprus to play for Pezoporikos. He subsequently returned to Yugoslavia and stayed for one and a half years with Radnički Beograd, before joining Partizan in the 1996 winter transfer window. With the Crno-beli, Vukićević won back-to-back championships in 1996 and 1997. He then moved to Spain and signed with Sevilla in the 1998 winter transfer window. Before retiring from the game, Vukićević also played for Recreativo in the 1999–2000 Segunda División.

== Managerial career ==
After hanging up his boots, Vukićević started his managerial career at Zeta in the summer of 2003. He spent the next four years at the club, winning the 2006–07 Montenegrin First League. Shortly after, Vukićević was appointed manager of Mogren. He led the side in the following three seasons, winning one Montenegrin First League and one Montenegrin Cup title.

On 15 August 2011, Vukićević was appointed manager of Vojvodina. He resigned from the position on 12 April 2012 after the club lost to Borac Čačak in the 2011–12 Serbian Cup semi-final.

Later on, Vukićević was manager of Dacia Chișinău, Ventspils, Feronikeli, and Laçi (twice).

== Career statistics ==
Appearances and goals by club, season and competition
Club	Season	League	
Club	Season	Apps	Goals
Budućnost Titograd	1987–88	13	0
Budućnost Titograd	1988–89	0	0
Budućnost Titograd	1989–90	22	0
Budućnost Titograd	1990–91	31	7
Budućnost Titograd	1991–92	13	0
Budućnost Titograd	Total	79	7
Mogren	1992–93	34	5
Radnički Beograd	1994–95	33	2
Radnički Beograd	1995–96	14	1
Radnički Beograd	Total	47	3
Partizan	1995–96	17	5
Partizan	1996–97	29	5
Partizan	1997–98	13	3
Partizan	Total	59	13

=== Managerial ===
As of 24 March 2024

Team	From	To	Record				
Team	From	To	P	W	D	L	W%
Zeta	1 July 2004	30 June 2006	62	32	10	20	51.61
Mogren	1 July 2007	13 April 2010	105	60	24	21	57.14
Vojvodina	15 August 2011	13 April 2012	27	13	9	5	48.15
Borac Čačak	3 April 2013	4 November 2013	28	14	3	11	50.00
Dacia Chișinău	9 January 2014	2 November 2014	27	17	4	6	62.96
Zeta	26 November 2015	12 December 2016	36	13	10	13	36.11
Mladost Podgorica	3 April 2017	25 September 2017	23	12	5	6	52.17
Ventspils	18 January 2018	4 May 2019	48	25	12	11	52.08
Feronikeli	10 August 2019	30 October 2019	12	6	1	5	50.00
Laçi	17 August 2021	18 October 2021	7	1	3	3	14.29
Laçi	3 August 2022	18 November 2022	14	6	2	6	42.86
Otrant-Olympic	30 January 2023	Present	40	21	15	4	52.50
Total			429	220	98	111	51.28

== Honours ==
=== Player ===
Partizan

- First League of FR Yugoslavia: 1995–96, 1996–97

=== Manager ===
Zeta

- Montenegrin First League: 2006–07

Mogren

- Montenegrin First League: 2008–09
- Montenegrin Cup: 2007–08
