= Stadion Trešnjica =

Football stadium in Zeta, Montenegro

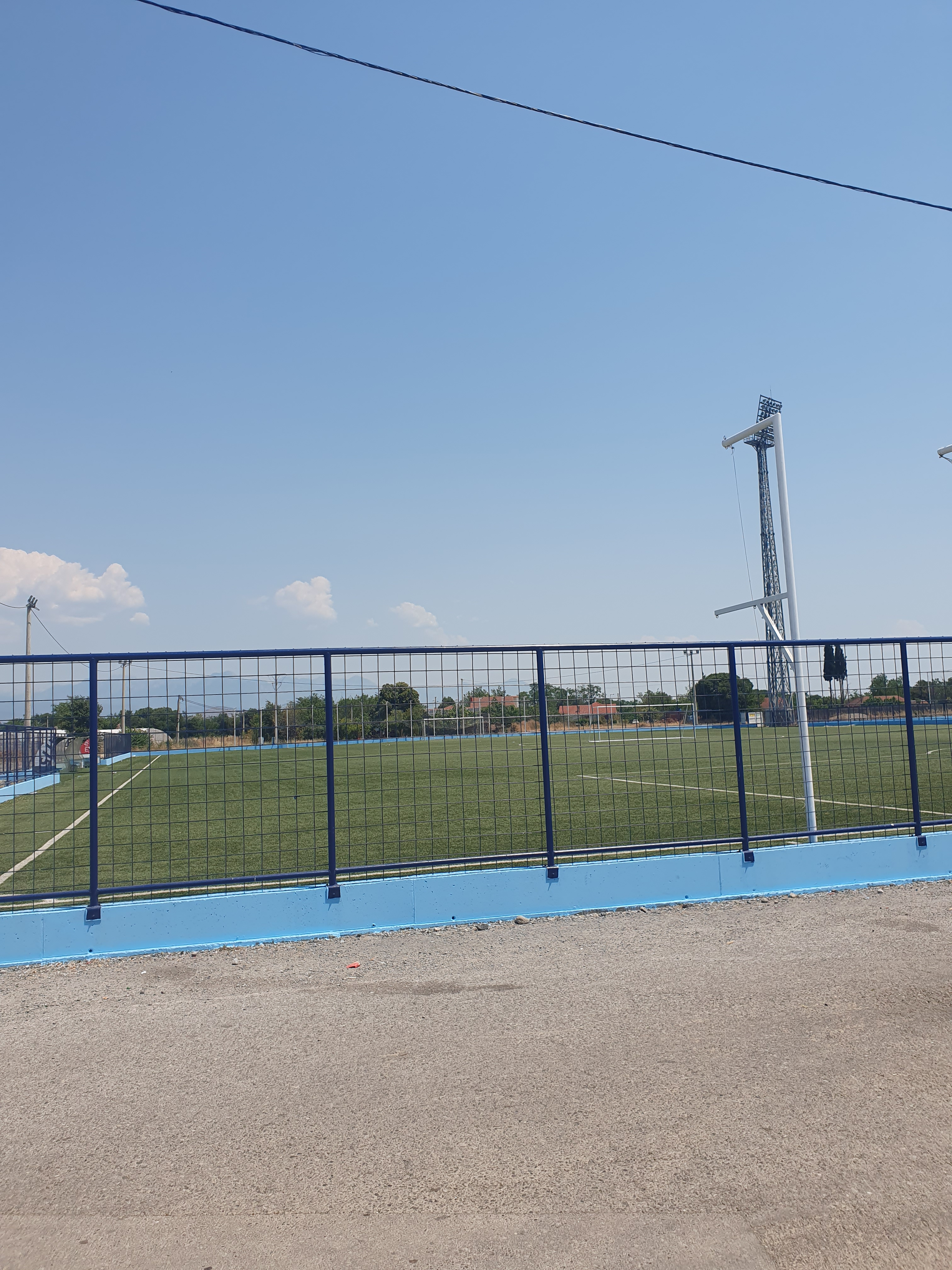
- Interactive map of Stadion Trešnjica
- Full name: Stadion Trešnjica
- Location: Golubovci, Montenegro
- Coordinates: 42°19′43″N 19°14′26″E
- Owner: FK Zeta
- Capacity: 4,000
- Surface: grass
- Field size: 110 m × 70 m (360 ft × 230 ft)

Construction
- Built: 1996
- Renovated: 2016

Tenant
- FK Zeta

Trešnjica Stadium is a football stadium in Golubovci (Zeta Municipality), Montenegro. It is used for football matches and is the home ground of FK Zeta.

== History ==
The football stadium at Trešnica location, at Golubovci, was built in 1996, following the season in which FK Zeta gained its first promotion to the Yugoslav Second League. Until now, the stadium was renovated a few times (last time in 2016) and near the main ground is built another pitch with artificial turf.
FK Zeta was played First League games at Trešnjica stadium from 2000 to 2022. Historical first game in the top-league, Zeta played on 12 August 2000 was against Milicionar (4:0) in Golubovci. That game at Trešnica stadium was attended by 5,000 supporters.
The Biggest crowd at games was 5,000 in numerous occasions, especially during the matches against Budućnost and, earlier, against Partizan and Crvena zvezda.

== Pitch and conditions ==
The pitch measures 110 x 70 meters. The stadium didn't met UEFA criteria for European competitions, so FK Zeta play their international games at Podgorica City Stadium.
In addition to the main field is an auxiliary field with artificial grass that is used for competitions in the junior categories.

== See also ==
- FK Zeta
- Golubovci
- Zeta Plain
- Podgorica
