= Stadion Donja Sutvara =

Football stadium in Montenegro

Coordinates: 42°21′53″N 18°45′22″E

- Interactive map of Stadion Donja Sutvara
- Full name: Stadion Donja Sutvara
- Location: Radanovići, Kotor, Montenegro
- Owner: OFK Grbalj
- Capacity: 1,500
- Surface: grass
- Field size: 110 x 65 m

Construction
- Built: 1995
- Renovated: 2004

Tenant
- OFK Grbalj

Stadion Donja Sutvara is a football stadium in Radanovići, Municipality of Kotor, Montenegro. It is used for football matches and is the home turf of OFK Grbalj. The stadium holds 1,500 people.

== History ==
The stadium was built in 1995 near the village Donja Sutvara, on the outskirts of Radanovići. It is situated near the main road between Kotor and Budva and is the home turf of OFK Grbalj.
In 2004, Donja Sutvara stadium was renovated to meet the criteria for games in the Montenegrin First League. The stadium consists of one level with a capacity of 1,500 seats.

== Pitch and conditions ==
The pitch measures 110 x 65 meters. The stadium didn't met UEFA criteria for European competitions.

== See also ==
- OFK Grbalj
- Kotor
