= 2024–25 Montenegrin Cup =

Tournament details
- Country: Montenegro
- Teams: 16

Final positions
- Champions: Dečić (1st title)
- Runners-up: Mornar

Tournament statistics
- Matches played: 17
- Goals scored: 38 (2.24 per match)

The 2024–25 Montenegrin Cup was the 19th edition of the knockout football tournament in Montenegro. It began on 6 November 2024. The winners qualified for the first qualifying round of the 2025–26 UEFA Conference League. Budućnost were the defending champions.

Dečić won the cup on 29 May 2025 (their first Montenegrin Cup win), defeating Mornar 1–0 in the final.

== First round ==
Draw for the first round was held on 30 October 2024. The matches were played on 6 November 2024.

=== Summary ===
| Team 1 | Score | Team 2 |
|---|---|---|
| Igalo (2) | 1–2 | Budućnost (1) |
| Otrant-Olympic (1) | 0–1 | Iskra (2) |
| Arsenal (1) | 1–4 | Podgorica (2) |
| Jezero (1) | 0–2 | Dečić (1) |
| Rudar (2) | 1–0 | Sutjeska (1) |
| Bokelj (1) | 3–0 | Grbalj (2) |
| Jedinstvo (1) | 0–2 | Mornar (1) |
| Petrovac (1) | 2–0 | Mladost DG (2) |

=== Matches ===
| 5 November 2024 | Igalo | 1–2 | Budućnost | Bar |
| 13:00 CET | Cordoba 65' | Report | Kostić 23'; Sarkic 30' | Stadium: Stadion Topolica; Attendance: 100; Referee: Savo Vujović |

| 6 November 2024 | Otrant-Olympic | 0–1 | Iskra | Podgorica |
| 13:00 CET | | Report | Perović 66' | Stadium: Kamp FSCG; Attendance: 50; Referee: Marko Ćupić |

| 6 November 2024 | Arsenal | 1–4 | Podgorica | Tivat |
| 13:00 CET | Mugoša 85' | Report | Pavlićević 15'; Kopitović 27', 52'; Gazivoda 83' | Stadium: Stadion u Parku; Attendance: 100; Referee: Vladimir Bjelica |

| 6 November 2024 | Jezero | 0–2 | Dečić | Berane |
| 13:00 CET | | Report | Matić 23'; Kajević 44' | Stadium: Gradski stadion Attendance: 100; Referee: Manojlo Sekulić |

| 6 November 2024 | Rudar | 1–0 | Sutjeska | Pljevlja |
| 13:00 CET | Vučićević 79' | Report | | Stadium: Gradski stadion Attendance: 300; Referee: Miloš Bešović |

| 6 November 2024 | Bokelj | 3–0 | Grbalj | Kotor |
| 14:00 CET | Vukotić 30'; Mori 48'; Sklender 86' (pen.) | Report | | Stadium: Stadion pod Vrmcem; Attendance: 200; Referee: Nikola Cvijović |

| 6 November 2024 | Jedinstvo | 0–2 | Mornar | Bijelo Polje |
| 14:00 CET | | Report | Đurišić 30'; Vujačić 72' (pen.) | Stadium: Gradski stadion Attendance: 200; Referee: Branko Odalović |

| 6 November 2024 | Petrovac | 2–0 | Mladost DG | Petrovac |
| 14:00 CET | Faust 45+1'; Golubović 78' | Report | | Stadium: Stadion Mitar Mićo Goliš; Attendance: 150; Referee: Vasilije Ljumović |

== Quarter-finals ==
Draw for the quarter-finals was held on 20 November 2024. The matches were played on 27 November 2024 and on 15 and 18 February 2025.

=== Summary ===
| Team 1 | Score | Team 2 |
|---|---|---|
| Mornar (1) | 3–0 | Bokelj (1) |
| Podgorica (2) | 0–0 (1–4 p) | Dečić (1) |
| Iskra (2) | 0–0 (4–1 p) | Budućnost (1) |
| Petrovac (1) | 2–1 | Rudar (2) |

=== Matches ===
| 27 November 2024 | Mornar | 3–0 | Bokelj | Bar |
| 13:00 CET | Vujačić 8'; Kishi 43'; Suwa 84' (o.g.) | Report | | Stadium: Stadion Topolica; Attendance: 150; Referee: Miloš Bešović |

| 27 November 2024 | Podgorica | 0–0 (1–4 p) | Dečić | Podgorica |
| 13:00 CET | | Report | | Stadium: DG Arena; Attendance: 200; Referee: Dejan Marković |

| 15 February 2025 | Iskra | 0–0 (4–1 p) | Budućnost | Danilovgrad |
| 13:00 CET | | Report | | Stadium: Braća Velašević Stadium; Attendance: 400; Referee: Nikola Dabanović |

| 18 February 2025 | Petrovac | 2–1 | Rudar | Petrovac |
| 15:00 CET | Bašić 59'; Šimun 61' | Report | Vučićević 29' | Stadium: Stadion Mitar Mićo Goliš; Attendance: 300; Referee: Miloš Savović |

== Semi-finals ==
The four quarter-final winners entered the semi-finals, held over two legs. The first legs were held on 16 April 2025, followed by the second legs on 30 April.

=== Summary ===
| Team 1 | Agg. | Team 2 | 1st leg | 2nd leg |
|---|---|---|---|---|
| Iskra (2) | 2–5 | Mornar (1) | 0–3 | 2–2 |
| Petrovac (1) | 2–3 | Dečić (1) | 0–1 | 2–2 |

=== First legs ===
| 16 April 2025 | Iskra | 0–3 | Mornar | Danilovgrad |
| 15:30 CEST | | Report | Škrijelj 8'; Yao 60'; Vuković 64' | Stadium: Braća Velašević Stadium; Attendance: 200; Referee: Miloš Bošković |

| 16 April 2025 | Petrovac | 0–1 | Dečić | Petrovac |
| 15:30 CEST | | Report | Božović 49' | Stadium: Stadion Mitar Mićo Goliš; Attendance: 300; Referee: Miloš Savović |

=== Second legs ===
| 30 April 2025 | Dečić | 2–2 (3–2 agg.) | Petrovac | Tuzi |
| 17:00 CEST | Kajević 20', 56' | Report | Franeta 34'; Šimun 38' | Stadium: Stadion Tuško Polje; Attendance: 1,000; Referee: Savo Vujović |

| 30 April 2025 | Mornar | 2–2 (5–2 agg.) | Iskra | Bar |
| 19:00 CEST | Sekulić 11'; Baošić 35' | Report | Perović 63'; Šćepanović 65' | Stadium: Stadion Topolica; Attendance: 550; Referee: Miloš Bešović |

== Final ==
The final was held between the two semi-final winners.

29 May 2025
17:00 CEST

| Mornar | 0–1 | Dečić |
|---|---|---|
| | Report | Kajević 23' |

Gradski stadion, Nikšić
Attendance: 2,500
Referee: Miloš Bošković

== See also ==
- 2024–25 Montenegrin First League
- 2024–25 Montenegrin Second League
