= 2016–17 Montenegrin Cup =

Tournament details
- Country: Montenegro
- Teams: 30

Final positions
- Champions: Sutjeska (1st title)
- Runners-up: Grbalj

Tournament statistics
- Matches played: 43
- Goals scored: 117 (2.72 per match)
- Top goal scorer(s): Nine players (3 goals each)

The 2016–17 Montenegrin Cup was the 11th season of the Montenegrin knockout football tournament. The winner of the tournament received a berth in the first qualifying round of the 2017–18 UEFA Europa League. The defending champions were Rudar, who beat Budućnost in the final of the last competition. The competition featured 30 teams. It started on 20 September 2016 and ended with the final on 31 May 2017.

== Participants ==
Like during the past seasons, in Montenegrin Cup 2016-17 were participated 30 clubs. Among them are 12 members of Montenegrin First League, 12 members of Montenegrin Second League and 6 teams from Montenegrin Third League - who were winners and runners-up of Montenegrin Regional Cups (North, Central, South) for season 2016.
Finalists of 2015–16 Montenegrin Cup (Rudar and Budućnost are starting competition from Round of 16, while all the other clubs are playing from the first round of competition.

== First round ==
Fourteen first round matches were played on 20 and 21 September 2016.

=== Summary ===
Team 1	Score	Team 2
Sloga Bar	0–6	Lovćen
Bratstvo	0–3	Grbalj
Petrovac	3–0	Grafičar
Jedinstvo	0–0 (4–2 p)	Čelik
Bokelj	2–0	Mornar
Hajduk	0–8	Mladost
Ibar	1–3	Iskra
Jezero	0–4	Zeta
Sutjeska	5–0	Radnički
Igalo	0–4	Dečić
Petnjica	0–2	Kom
Brskovo	1–1 (4–2 p)	Gorštak
Otrant-Olympic	1–1 (4–5 p)	Berane
Mladost Lješkopolje	0–0 (4–2 p)	Cetinje
Budućnost	bye	
Rudar	bye	

=== Matches ===
20 September 2016	Sloga Bar	0–6	Lovćen	Bar
15:00 CEST		Report	Jabučanin 16', 44'; Pepić 20', 64'; Đurović 36' (pen.); Bogdanović 84'	Stadium: Stadion Topolica; Attendance: 50; Referee: Nikola Cvijović

21 September 2016	Bokelj	2–0	Mornar	Kotor
15:00 CEST	Simunović 34'; Maraš 64'	Report		Stadium: Stadion pod Vrmcem; Attendance: 100; Referee: Savo Vujović

21 September 2016	Hajduk	0–8	Mladost	Bar
15:00 CEST		Report	M. Burzanović 15', 81'; Lazarević 41'; Kopitović 50', 74'; Stijepović 65', 86'; M. Radulović 72'	Stadium: Stadion Topolica; Attendance: 100; Referee: Marko Ivanović

21 September 2016	Ibar	1–3	Iskra	Rožaje
15:00 CEST	Hot 66'	Report	G. Burzanović 34'; Ba. Božović 69'; Bošnjak 85'	Stadium: Stadion Bandžovo Brdo; Attendance: 100; Referee: Miloš Bošković

21 September 2016	Jezero	0–4	Zeta	Plav
15:00 CEST		Report	Kordić 61'; Krkotić 73', 75'; Adžović 90'	Stadium: Stadion Pod Racinom; Attendance: 150; Referee: Vladan Kojović

21 September 2016	Sutjeska	5–0	Radnički	Nikšić
15:00 CEST	Raković 13' (o.g.); Vuković 46'; Bakrač 52'; Vukmarković 60' (o.g.); Vučić 74'	Report		Stadium: Gradski stadion Attendance: 300; Referee: Vojin Vojinović

21 September 2016	Igalo	0–4	Dečić	Igalo
15:00 CEST		Report	V. Vujačić 9', 14'; Đuranović 57'; Kuč 64'	Stadium: Stadion Solila; Attendance: 60; Referee: Željko Radunović

21 September 2016	Petnjica	0–2	Kom	Petnjica
15:00 CEST		Report	Milošević 30'; Hino 87'	Stadium: Stadion Gusare; Attendance: 100; Referee: Miloš Nedić

21 September 2016	Brskovo	1–1 (4–2 p)	Gorštak	Mojkovac
15:00 CEST	N. Radulović 87'	Report	F. Marković 37'	Stadium: Gradski stadion Referee: Dražen Petrić

21 September 2016	Otrant-Olympic	1–1 (4–5 p)	Berane	Ulcinj
15:00 CEST	Muharemović 77'	Report	Vojvodić 34'	Stadium: Stadion Olympic; Attendance: 250; Referee: Radoje Pajović

21 September 2016	Mladost Lješkopolje	0–0 (4–2 p)	Cetinje	Podgorica
15:00 CEST		Report		Stadium: Stari Ribnjak Stadium; Attendance: 100; Referee: Dragan Mijušković

21 September 2016	Bratstvo	0–3	Grbalj	Ljajkovići
15:00 CEST			Tučević 12'; Dinčić 51'; Nedić 70'	Stadium: Stadion Ljajkovići; Attendance: 50; Referee: Miraš Cerović

21 September 2016	Petrovac	3–0	Grafičar	Petrovac
15:00 CEST	Kacić 3', 74'; Drobnjak 24'	Report		Stadium: Stadion pod Malim brdom Attendance: 50; Referee: Milovan Milačić

21 September 2016	Jedinstvo	0–0 (4–2 p)	Čelik	Berane
15:00 CEST		Report		Stadium: Gradski Stadion; Attendance: 150; Referee: Aleksandar Marković

== Second round ==
Sixteen clubs competed in the second round played over two legs on 28 September and 26 October 2016.

=== Summary ===
Team 1	Agg.	Team 2	1st leg	2nd leg
Zeta	2–3	Sutjeska	0–1	2–2
Kom	1–6	Budućnost	1–5	0–1
Petrovac	3–2	Jedinstvo	3–0	0–2
Grbalj	4–3	Mladost	3–1	1–2
Rudar	(a) 1–1	Dečić	0–0	1–1
Brskovo	2–5	Lovćen	2–4	0–1
Iskra	5–2	Mladost Lješkopolje	4–1	1–1
Bokelj	3–0	Berane	1–0	2–0

=== First legs ===
28 September 2016	Zeta	0–1	Sutjeska	Podgorica
15:00 CEST		Report	Ivanović 68'	Stadium: Podgorica City Stadium; Attendance: 200; Referee: Miloš Bošković

28 September 2016	Kom	1–5	Budućnost	Tuzi
15:00 CEST	Kilibarda 68'	Report	G. Vujović 45+1', 66'; Pejaković 79'; Mil. Raičević 83'; Raspopović 87' (pen.)	Stadium: Stadion Tuško Polje; Attendance: 250; Referee: Dražen Petrić

28 September 2016	Petrovac	3–0	Jedinstvo	Petrovac
15:00 CEST	Mikijelj 47'; A. Vujačić 50', 90+3'	Report		Stadium: Stadion pod Malim brdom Attendance: 100; Referee: Željko Radunović

28 September 2016	Grbalj	3–1	Mladost	Radanovići
15:00 CEST	Pavlović 13', 32'; Jablan 82'	Report	Mir. Raičević 90'	Stadium: Stadion Donja Sutvara; Attendance: 100; Referee: Savo Vujović

28 September 2016	Rudar	0–0	Dečić	Pljevlja
15:00 CEST		Report		Stadium: Gradski stadion Attendance: 200; Referee: Radoje Pajović

28 September 2016	Brskovo	2–4	Lovćen	Mojkovac
15:00 CEST	Banda 59'; Ćorić 84'	Report	Flamarion 53', 79'; Vujanović 54', 90+2'	Stadium: Gradski stadion Attendance: 200; Referee: Miloš Nedić

28 September 2016	Iskra	4–1	Mladost Lješkopolje	Danilovgrad
15:00 CEST	Kovačević 22', 32', 62'; Novović 77'	Report	Spasojević 87'	Stadium: Braća Velašević Stadium; Attendance: 150; Referee: Vojin Vojinović

28 September 2016	Bokelj	1–0	Berane	Kotor
15:00 CEST	Macanović 57'	Report		Stadium: Stadion pod Vrmcem; Attendance: 200; Referee: Vladan Kojović

=== Second legs ===
26 October 2016	Mladost	2–1 (3–4 agg.)	Grbalj	Podgorica
13:00 CEST	Kopitović 16'; M. Burzanović 18'	Report	Garuch 45+1'	Stadium: Mladost Stadium; Attendance: 200; Referee: Miloš Bošković

26 October 2016	Jedinstvo	2–0 (2–3 agg.)	Petrovac	Bijelo Polje
13:30 CEST	Nikolić 31'; Dulović 81'	Report		Stadium: Gradski stadion Attendance: 200; Referee: Aleksandar Marković

26 October 2016	Berane	0–2 (0–3 agg.)	Bokelj	Berane
13:30 CEST		Report	Vučinić 45+1', 69'	Stadium: Gradski stadion Attendance: 200; Referee: Miraš Cerović

26 October 2016	Mladost Lješkopolje	1–1 (2–5 agg.)	Iskra	Podgorica
13:30 CEST	Malidžan 64'	Report	Perutović 90+2'	Stadium: Stari Ribnjak Stadium; Attendance: 50; Referee: Nikola Vođević

26 October 2016	Lovćen	1–0 (5–2 agg.)	Brskovo	Cetinje
13:30 CEST	Vuković 2'	Report		Stadium: Stadion Obilića poljana Referee: Miloš Nedić

26 October 2016	Dečić	1–1 (1–1(a) agg.)	Rudar	Tuzi
13:30 CEST	V. Vujačić 36'	Report	I. Marković 66'	Stadium: Stadion Tuško Polje; Attendance: 200; Referee: Mileta Šćepanović

26 October 2016	Sutjeska	2–2 (3–2 agg.)	Zeta	Nikšić
13:30 CEST	Jildemar 58', 83'	Report	Kordić 64'; Krkotić 87'	Stadium: Gradski stadion Referee: Milovan Milačić

26 October 2016	Budućnost	1–0 (6–1 agg.)	Kom	Podgorica
15:30 CEST	Janketić 8'	Report		Stadium: Camp FSCG; Attendance: 100; Referee: Dragan Mijušković

== Quarter-finals ==
Eight clubs competed in the quarter-finals played over two legs on 2 and 30 November 2016.

=== Summary ===
Team 1	Agg.	Team 2	1st leg	2nd leg
Iskra	3–1	Lovćen	1–0	2–1
Petrovac	1–1 (3–4 p)	Sutjeska	1–0	0–1
Budućnost	2–2 (a)	Grbalj	2–1	0–1
Rudar	2–1	Bokelj	1–1	1–0

=== First legs ===
2 November 2016	Iskra	1–0	Lovćen	Danilovgrad
13:30 CET	Šćepanović 41' (pen.)	Report		Stadium: Braća Velašević Stadium; Attendance: 300; Referee: Radoje Pajović

2 November 2016	Petrovac	1–0	Sutjeska	Petrovac
13:30 CET	A. Vujačić 9'	Report		Stadium: Stadion pod Malim brdom Attendance: 200; Referee: Miloš Novović

2 November 2016	Budućnost	2–1	Grbalj	Podgorica
13:30 CET	Đalović 25', 42'	Report	Dinčić 74'	Stadium: Podgorica City Stadium; Attendance: 500; Referee: Mileta Šćepanović

2 November 2016	Rudar	1–1	Bokelj	Pljevlja
13:30 CET	Golubović 3'	Report	M. Vujović 62'	Stadium: Gradski stadion Attendance: 200; Referee: Vladan Kojović

=== Second legs ===
30 November 2016	Lovćen	1–2 (1–3 agg.)	Iskra	Cetinje
13:00 CET	Đurović 67'	Report	Perutović 10'; Krstović 53'	Stadium: Stadion Obilića poljana Attendance: 300; Referee: Mileta Šćepanović

30 November 2016	Sutjeska	1–0 (1–1 agg.) (4–3 p)	Petrovac	Nikšić
13:00 CET	Bo. Božović 78'	Report		Stadium: Gradski stadion Attendance: 300; Referee: Pavle Radovanović

30 November 2016	Grbalj	1–0 (2(a)–2 agg.)	Budućnost	Radanovići
13:00 CET	Pavlović 88'	Report		Stadium: Stadion Donja Sutvara; Attendance: 300; Referee: Predrag Radovanović

30 November 2016	Bokelj	0–1 (1–2 agg.)	Rudar	Kotor
13:00 CET		Report	Alić 52'	Stadium: Stadion pod Vrmcem; Attendance: 200; Referee: Miloš Bošković

== Semi-finals ==
Four clubs competed in the semi-finals played over two legs on 12 and 26 April 2017.

=== Summary ===
Team 1	Agg.	Team 2	1st leg	2nd leg
Iskra	3–9	Sutjeska	0–5	3–4
Rudar	1–2	Grbalj	1–1	0–1

=== First legs ===
12 April 2017	Rudar	1–1	Grbalj	Pljevlja
16:00 CEST	D. Božović 5'	Report	Nedić 78'	Stadium: Gradski stadion Referee: Mileta Šćepanović

12 April 2017	Iskra	0–5	Sutjeska	Danilovgrad
16:00 CEST		Report	Vlaisavljević 3', 23'; Kovačević 37'; Ivanović 54'; Zarubica 67'	Stadium: Braća Velašević Stadium; Attendance: 500; Referee: Pavle Radovanović

=== Second legs ===
26 April 2017	Grbalj	1–0 (2–1 agg.)	Rudar	Radanovići
16:00 CEST	Zorica 7'	Report		Stadium: Stadion Donja Sutvara; Attendance: 400; Referee: Pavle Radovanović

26 April 2017	Sutjeska	4–3 (9–3 agg.)	Iskra	Nikšić
16:30 CEST	Shimura 5'; Poček 49'; Zarubica 59'; Bošković 90'	Report	Perutović 5'; Savićević 44'; Memčević 80'	Stadium: Gradski stadion Attendance: 250; Referee: Miraš Cerović

== Final ==
31 May 2017
20:30 CEST

Sutjeska	1–0	Grbalj
Vlaisavljević 72'	Report

Podgorica City Stadium, Podgorica
Attendance: 5,000
Referee: Milovan Milačić

== See also ==
- Montenegrin Cup
- Montenegrin Regional Cups
- Montenegrin First League
