= 2019–20 Montenegrin Cup =

Tournament details
- Country: Montenegro
- Teams: 26

Final positions
- Champions: abandoned, no champion

Tournament statistics
- Matches played: 32
- Goals scored: 91 (2.84 per match)
- Top goal scorer: Igor Vukčević (4 goals)

The 2019–20 Montenegrin Cup was the 14th season of the knockout football tournament in Montenegro. The cup began on 28 August 2019, but wasn't finished due to the coronavirus pandemic.

Budućnost were the defending champions from the previous season after defeating Lovćen in the final by the score of 4–0.

== First round ==
Draw for the first round was held on 22 August 2019. Ten first round matches were played on 28 August 2019 and one was played on 25 September 2019.

=== Summary ===
Team 1	Score	Team 2
Rudar	1–0	Otrant-Olympic
Jedinstvo	1–0	Kom
Sloga Radovići	0–11	OFK Titograd
Zeta	2–2 (8–7 p)	Dečić
Grbalj	4–0	Arsenal
Cetinje	0–7	Podgorica
Mornar	0–2	Iskra
Komovi	0–4	Ibar
Mladost DG	2–4	Drezga
Bokelj	1–0	Jezero
Gorštak	0–5	Petnjica
Budućnost	bye	
Lovćen	bye	
Petrovac	bye	
Sutjeska	bye	

=== Matches ===
28 August 2019	Komovi	0–4	Ibar	Berane
16:30 CEST		Report	Shibata 29'; Sekulić 60', 84'; Zekić 67'	Stadium: Gradski stadion Attendance: 100; Referee: Miloš Nedić

28 August 2019	Mladost DG	2–4	Drezga	Podgorica
16:30 CEST	A. Maraš 33', 90'	Report	Ćosović 46', 66', 90+4'; Vujisić 45'	Stadium: DG Arena; Attendance: 50; Referee: Mladen Knežević

28 August 2019	Bokelj	1–0	Jezero	Kotor
16:30 CEST	Stevović 80'			Stadium: Stadion pod Vrmcem; Attendance: 100; Referee: Đorđije Čalić

28 August 2019	Rudar	1–0	Otrant-Olympic	Pljevlja
16:30 CEST	Vujačić 29'	Report		Stadium: Gradski stadion Attendance: 300; Referee: Vladimir Bjelica

28 August 2019	Jedinstvo	1–0	Kom	Bijelo Polje
16:30 CEST	Mušović 70'	Report		Stadium: Gradski stadion Attendance: 300; Referee: Radoje Pajović

28 August 2019	Sloga Radovići	0–11	OFK Titograd	Tivat
16:30 CEST		Report	Lucas 33', 49'; Škrijelj 46', 84'; Miličković 55', 81'; Vukčević 57', 63', 72', 85'; Matanović 77'	Stadium: Stadion u Parku; Attendance: 50; Referee: Miloš Bešović

28 August 2019	Zeta	2–2 (8–7 p)	Dečić	Golubovci
16:30 CEST	Bošnjak 27'; Yamoah 78'	Report	L. Božović 90'; Gjolaj 30'	Stadium: Stadion Trešnjica; Attendance: 250; Referee: Savo Vujović

28 August 2019	Grbalj	4–0	Arsenal Tivat	Radanovići
16:30 CEST	Macanović 3'; Kartal 20'; Kordić 35'; Serbul 87'	Report		Stadium: Stadion Donja Sutvara; Attendance: 150; Referee: Dalibor Vujisić

28 August 2019	Cetinje	0–7	Podgorica	Zelenika
16:30 CEST		Report	Jovanović 18'; Bulatović 37'; Zvrko 38', 42'; Sekulić 45'; Tripković 80'; L. Maraš 84'	Stadium: Stadion Opačica; Attendance: 50; Referee: Marko Ćupić

28 August 2019	Gorštak	0–5	Petnjica	Mojkovac
16:30 CEST		Report	Babačić 50', 51'; Latić 63'; Rastoder 68'; Korać 77' (pen.)	Stadium: Gradski stadion Attendance: 30; Referee: Aleksandar Šćekić

25 September 2019	Mornar	0–2	Iskra	Nikšić
15:00 CEST		Report	Mandić 6'; Boričić 77'	Stadium: Pomoćni teren FK Sutjeska; Attendance: 100; Referee: Nikola Vođević

== Second round ==
Draw for the second round was held on 26 September 2019, Jedinstvo received a bye. After the draw, Petnjica withdrew from the competition. Twelve clubs competed in the second round which was played over two legs from 2 to 23 October 2019.

=== Summary ===
Team 1	Agg.	Team 2	1st leg	2nd leg
Grbalj	4–5	Iskra	3–1	1–4
Ibar	0–3	Zeta	0–0	0–3
Sutjeska	7–0	Lovćen	4–0	3–0
Petnjica	0–6 (w/o)	Podgorica	0–3 (w/o)	0–3 (w/o)
Rudar	1–2	Budućnost	0–0	1–2
Petrovac	2–2 (10–9 p)	Drezga	2–0	0–2
Bokelj	2–4	OFK Titograd	1–2	1–2
Jedinstvo	bye			

=== First legs ===
2 October 2019	Grbalj	3–1	Iskra	Radanovići
14:30 CEST	Kacić 67' (pen.); Đorđević 21', 90'	Report	Mandić 20'	Stadium: Stadion Donja Sutvara; Attendance: 100; Referee: Aleksandar Šćekić

2 October 2019	Ibar	0–0	Zeta	Rožaje
14:30 CEST		Report		Stadium: Stadion Bandžovo brdo Attendance: 200; Referee: Jovan Kaluđerović

2 October 2019	Sutjeska	4–0	Lovćen	Nikšić
14:30 CEST	Vlaisavljević 59'; Marković 61', 90+3'; Vučić 77' (pen.)	Report		Stadium: Gradski stadion Attendance: 200; Referee: Dalibor Vujisić

2 October 2019	Rudar	0–0	Budućnost	Pljevlja
14:30 CEST		Report		Stadium: Gradski stadion Attendance: 200; Referee: Radoje Pajović

2 October 2019	Petrovac	2–0	Drezga	Petrovac
14:30 CEST	Kalezić 21'; Kopitović 56'	Report		Stadium: Stadion pod Malim brdom Attendance: 85; Referee: Miloš Nedić

2 October 2019	Bokelj	1–2	Titograd	Kotor
14:30 CEST	Bakić 59'	Report	Raičević 41'; Novović 90+3'	Stadium: Stadion pod Vrmcem; Attendance: 150; Referee: Miraš Cerović

=== Second legs ===
23 October 2019	Iskra	4–1 (5–4 agg.)	Grbalj	Podgorica
13:30 CEST	Zečević 12' (o.g.); Karaklajić 37'; Obradović 65'; Camaj 86'	Report	Zečević 23'	Stadium: Camp FSCG; Attendance: 150; Referee: Mileta Šćepanović

23 October 2019	Zeta	3–0 (3–0 agg.)	Ibar	Golubovci
13:30 CEST	Mučalica 20' (o.g.); Lambulić 32'; Yamoah 77'	Report		Stadium: Stadion Trešnjica; Attendance: 70; Referee: Radoje Pajović

23 October 2019	Lovćen	0–3 (0–7 agg.)	Sutjeska	Budva
13:30 CEST		Report	B. Božović 62'; Grivić 64'; Ćetković 86'	Stadium: Stadion Lugovi; Attendance: 60; Referee: Miloš Bešović

23 October 2019	Budućnost	2–1 (2–1 agg.)	Rudar	Podgorica
13:30 CEST	Perović 10'; Stoiljković 80'	Report	Vuković 73'	Stadium: Podgorica City Stadium; Attendance: 200; Referee: Milovan Milačić

23 October 2019	Drezga	2–0 (2–2 agg.) (9–10 p)	Petrovac	Spuž
13:30 CEST	Tomašević 43'; Popović 57'	Report		Stadium: Stadion FK Zora; Attendance: 50; Referee: Miloš Laličić

23 October 2019	OFK Titograd	2–1 (4–2 agg.)	Bokelj	Podgorica
13:30 CEST	Nikolić 71'; Miličković 90+2'	Report	Poček 90+4'	Stadium: Mladost Stadium; Attendance: 100; Referee: Miraš Cerović

== Quarter-finals ==
Draw for the quarter-finals was held on 31 October 2019. The quarter-finals were played over two legs from 6 November 2019 to 15 December 2019.

=== Summary ===
Team 1	Agg.	Team 2	1st leg	2nd leg
Jedinstvo	0–8	Budućnost	0–1	0–7
Zeta	0–1	Sutjeska	0–0	0–1
Podgorica	(a) 1–1	Iskra	0–0	1–1
OFK Titograd	0–2	Petrovac	0–0	0–2

=== First legs ===
6 November 2019	Jedinstvo	0–1	Budućnost	Bijelo Polje
13:30 CET		Report	Zarubica 50'	Stadium: Gradski stadion Attendance: 400; Referee: Miloš Bošković

27 November 2019	OFK Titograd	0–0	Petrovac	Podgorica
13:00 CET		Report		Stadium: Mladost Stadium; Attendance: 100; Referee: Predrag Radovanović

27 November 2019	Zeta	0–0	Sutjeska	Golubovci
13:00 CET		Report		Stadium: Stadion Trešnjica; Attendance: 200; Referee: Radoje Pajović

27 November 2019	Podgorica	0–0	Iskra	Podgorica
16:00 CET		Report		Stadium: DG Arena; Attendance: 300; Referee: Milovan Milačić

=== Second legs ===
27 November 2019	Budućnost	7–0 (8–0 agg.)	Jedinstvo	Podgorica
17:00 CET	Ivanović 16', 21', 30'; Zarubica 26'; D. Božović 41', 77'; Damjanović 80'	Report		Stadium: Podgorica City Stadium; Attendance: 150; Referee: Miloš Bošković

15 December 2019	Petrovac	2–0 (2–0 agg.)	OFK Titograd	Petrovac
13:00 CET	Kalezić 25'; Marković 82'	Report		Stadium: Stadion pod Malim brdom Attendance: 100; Referee: Miloš Novović

15 December 2019	Iskra	1–1 (1–1 (a) agg.)	Podgorica	Danilovgrad
13:00 CET	Milić 67'	Report	Kordić 90+3'	Stadium: Braća Velašević Stadium; Attendance: 100; Referee: Milovan Milačić

15 December 2019	Sutjeska	1–0 (1–0 agg.)	Zeta	Nikšić
13:00 CET	Vlaisavljević 43'	Report		Stadium: Gradski stadion Attendance: 500; Referee: Savo Vujović

== Interruption ==
Montenegrin Cup was interrupted in March 2020, before the semi-finals, due to the coronavirus pandemic. Semifinalists were FK Budućnost, FK Sutjeska, FK Podgorica and OFK Petrovac.
Three months after that, Football Association of Montenegro decided that Montenegrin Cup for the season 2019-20 won't be continued, as all official competitions were suspended.

== See also ==
- Montenegrin Cup
- Montenegrin First League
