= List of FK Lovćen seasons =

This is a list of the seasons played by FK Lovćen from 1913, when the club was founded. The club's achievements in all major national competitions are listed.

== Seasons 1913-1937 ==
=== Appearances ===
As the oldest Montenegrin football club, Lovćen participated in its first national competitions in the 1910s and 1920s. Exact results from the period 1913-1937 are not available, but below is the list of seasons and competitions in which participated FK Lovćen before World War II.

Season	Competition	Matches
1914	'Sports olympiad'	Unknown
1925	'Zeta olympiad'	vs. Primorac 2:4
1926	'Zeta olympiad'	vs. Crnogorac 4:2, Onogošt 2:0
1927	'Zeta olympiad'	vs. Berane 7:0, Onogošt 4:2, Yugoslav Army 4:0
1927	Montenegrin championship	final vs. Balšić 1:0
1927	Yugoslav championship / qualifiers	vs. GOŠK Jug 0:2
1928	Montenegrin championship	Unknown
1929	Montenegrin championship	final vs. Crnogorac 6:5
1930/31	Montenegrin championship	Unknown
1931/32	Montenegrin championship	Unknown
1932/33	Montenegrin championship	final vs. Budućnost 2:2, 2:4
1933/34	Montenegrin championship	final vs. Budućnost 1:1, 0:2
1934/35	Montenegrin championship	final vs. Budućnost 2:1

Source: http://www.fklovcen.me/?page_id=10
At 1937, regime of Kingdom of Yugoslavia prohibited work of FK Lovćen and FK Budućnost, because they were named as Workers' football clubs. That was the end of FK Lovćen participation in the official competitions until the end of World War II.

=== Honours and achievements ===
Competition	Titles	Runner-up	Champion seasons
Montenegrin championship	5	5	Spring 1925, Autumn 1925, Spring 1927, Autumn 1928, 1935
'Zeta olympiad'	2	1	1926, 1927
'Sports olympiad'	1	-	1914

Montenegrin championship - Elimination tournament for Montenegrin football clubs; 'Zeta olympiad' - Cup tournament for Montenegrin football clubs; 'Sports olympiad' - tournament held on Cetinje, with participation of clubs from Montenegro, Albania and Austria-Hungary.

== Seasons 1946- ==
=== Overall ===
Most of their seasons, Lovćen spent in the second and third football level in SFR Yugoslavia and, after that, in FR Yugoslavia. In the 1940s and 1950s, Lovćen participated in the Yugoslav First League playoffs, but without promotion to the top-tier. After Montenegrin independence, the club made their first appearances in the First League (since the season 2007-08).

Competition Level	Seasons	First season	Last season	Matches	W	D	L	GD
First League	11	2007-08	2018-19	366	122	91	153	362:428
Second League	30	1953-54	2019-20	899	332	204	363	1141:1233
Third League	3	1988-89	1991-92	101	39	18	44	129:160
Republic League	30	1946	2005-06	656	370	144	142	1341:645
Playoffs	11	1946	2018-19	43	17	8	18	61:71
National Cup	25	1950	2019-20	76	31	12	33	103:102
UEFA competitions	1	2014-15	2014-15	2	0	1	1	0:1
OVERALL (1946-)				2143	911	478	754	3137:2640

=== Seasons in domestic competitions ===
==== Championship ====
===== Final placement by seasons =====
From 1946, FK Lovćen played 74 seasons in domestic leagues of SFR Yugoslavia, FR Yugoslavia, Serbia and Montenegro and Montenegro. Below is a list of FK Lovćen final placements by every single season.

Season	League	Pos	M	W	D	L	GD	Pts
1946	Montenegrin Republic League	2	6	4	1	1	22:9	9
1946/47	Montenegrin Republic League	3	8	4	1	3	21:13	9
1947/48	Montenegrin Republic League	2	7	4	2	1	12:7	10
1948/49	Montenegrin Republic League	2	6	3	2	1	11:5	8
1949/50	Montenegrin Republic League	7	14	5	1	8	19:28	11
1950/51	Montenegrin Republic League	4	18	10	4	4	42:25	24
1951/52	Montenegrin Republic League	4	6	3	1	2	15:9	7
1952/53	Montenegrin Republic League	2	14	9	3	2	54:13	21
1953/54	Yugoslav Second League	7	18	5	7	6	25:28	17
1954/55	Yugoslav Second League	6	18	7	2	9	37:31	16
1955/56	Yugoslav Second League	1	17	13	1	3	43:12	27
1956/57	Yugoslav Second League	1	18	14	2	2	55:16	30
1957/58	Yugoslav Second League	2	18	13	1	4	49:20	27
1958/59	Yugoslav Second League	12	22	4	1	17	20:61	9
1959/60	Montenegrin Republic League	1	14	13	1	0	56:10	27
1960/61	Montenegrin Republic League	2	5	3	1	1	15:7	7
1961/62	Montenegrin Republic League	4	16	8	4	4	41:18	20
1962/63	Montenegrin Republic League	1	18	10	5	3	36:15	25
1963/64	Montenegrin Republic League	2	18	12	4	2	43:12	28
1964/65	Montenegrin Republic League	1	18	14	3	1	42:9	31
1965/66	Yugoslav Second League	14	34	11	8	15	42:66	30
1966/67	Yugoslav Second League	13	34	11	11	12	29:38	33
1967/68	Yugoslav Second League	8	34	14	6	14	41:47	34
1968/69	Yugoslav Second League	4	30	12	11	7	35:21	35
1969/70	Yugoslav Second League	6	30	10	9	11	33:33	29
1970/71	Yugoslav Second League	6	30	12	6	12	42:37	30
1971/72	Yugoslav Second League	6	34	12	12	10	31:28	36
1972/73	Yugoslav Second League	9	34	12	9	13	48:42	33
1973/74	Montenegrin Republic League	1	30	25	2	3	87:18	52
1974/75	Yugoslav Second League	11	34	14	5	15	50:45	33
1975/76	Yugoslav Second League	11	34	13	7	14	44:45	33
1976/77	Yugoslav Second League	9	34	14	8	12	35:40	36
1977/78	Yugoslav Second League	18	34	12	3	19	26:59	27
1978/79	Montenegrin Republic League	3	26	12	5	9	42:24	29
1979/80	Montenegrin Republic League	1	26	16	7	3	59:22	39
1980/81	Yugoslav Second League	14	30	10	8	12	28:32	28
1981/82	Montenegrin Republic League	1	26	15	5	6	48:21	35
1982/83	Yugoslav Second League	18	34	6	8	20	24:54	20
1983/84	Montenegrin Republic League	6	30	12	7	11	43:29	31
1984/85	Montenegrin Republic League	1	30	17	7	6	62:26	41
1985/86	Yugoslav Second League	17	34	8	9	17	34:63	25
1986/87	Montenegrin Republic League	7	26	6	11	9	21:29	23
1987/88	Montenegrin Republic League	3	30	19	7	4	71:25	45
1988/89	Yugoslav Second League	17	34	12	6	16	55:62	30
1989/90	Montenegrin Republic League	1	32	21	5	6	74:32	47
1990/91	Yugoslav Third League	16	34	14	3	16	36:50	31
1991/92	Yugoslav Third League	9	33	13	9	11	38:47	35
1992/93	Montenegrin Republic League	1	26	18	4	4	56:26	40
1993/94	FR Yugoslavia Second League	20	36	10	3	23	37:67	23
1994/95	Montenegrin Republic League	4	34	18	10	6	78:31	46
1995/96	Montenegrin Republic League	9	34	13	9	12	62:59	35
1996/97	Montenegrin Republic League	3	30	17	8	5	47:17	59
1997/98	Montenegrin Republic League	2	30	21	6	3	59:19	69
1998/99	FR Yugoslavia Second League	8	21	10	2	9	27:31	32
1999/00	FR Yugoslavia Second League	15	34	9	10	15	34:48	37
2000/01	FR Yugoslavia Second League	8	33	9	7	17	42:63	34
2001/02	FR Yugoslavia Second League	9	33	10	8	15	29:45	38
2002/03	FR Yugoslavia Second League	10	33	9	10	14	43:45	37
2003/04	Montenegrin Republic League	2	30	19	7	4	62:17	64
2004/05	Montenegrin Republic League	11	33	11	7	15	35:43	40
2005/06	Montenegrin Republic League	8	33	12	5	16	37:41	41
2006/07	Montenegrin Second League	1	33	21	6	6	50:21	69
2007/08	Montenegrin First League	6	33	11	10	12	28:30	43
2008/09	Montenegrin First League	8	33	10	10	13	25:25	40
2009/10	Montenegrin First League	6	33	15	7	11	32:37	52
2010/11	Montenegrin First League	8	33	9	10	14	29:36	37
2011/12	Montenegrin First League	6	33	10	10	13	34:42	40
2012/13	Montenegrin First League	9	33	11	4	18	38:51	37
2013/14	Montenegrin First League	2	33	17	8	8	52:31	59
2014/15	Montenegrin First League	6	33	15	5	13	42:32	50
2015/16	Montenegrin First League	9	33	9	9	15	32:42	36
2016/17	Montenegrin First League	11	33	10	7	16	25:36	34
2017/18	Montenegrin Second League	3	33	17	10	6	56:31	61
2018/19	Montenegrin First League	9	36	5	11	20	29:65	26
2019/20	Montenegrin Second League	9	30	6	11	13	31:43	29

===== Playoffs =====
At the end of nine seasons, FK Lovćen played in the playoffs for placement in the First Yugoslav League and Second Yugoslav League. Three times, Lovćen played playoffs for the First Yugoslav League promotion.

Year	Playoff	Round	Opponent	Home	Away
1946	First League playoffs	Quarterfinals	Građanski Skopje	3:0	
1946	First League playoffs	Semifinals	Borac Banja Luka	5:1	5:1
1946	First League playoffs	Final	OFK Beograd	0:2	2:6
1948/49	Second League playoffs	Group	Šibenik	0:1	0:1
1948/49	Second League playoffs	Group	Borac Banja Luka	2:4	0:3
1952/53	Second League playoffs	Group	Napredak Kruševac	1:0	1:1
1952/53	Second League playoffs	Group	Mačva Šabac	0:2	0:2
1952/53	Second League playoffs	Group	Rabotnik Bitola	2:0	3:2
1955/56	First League playoffs	Round one	Čelik Zenica	2:1	0:0
1955/56	First League playoffs	Group	Vardar Skopje	1:2	0:2
1955/56	First League playoffs	Group	Lokomotiva Zagreb	4:1	1:6
1955/56	First League playoffs	Group	Borovo	2:1	1:0
1956/57	First League playoffs	Round one	Željezničar Sarajevo	0:0	0:2
1957/58	Second League playoffs	Group	Trepča Kosovska Mitrovica	3:0	4:1
1957/58	Second League playoffs	Group	Sloboda Užice	3:0	0:2
1957/58	Second League playoffs	Group	Sloga Kraljevo	3:2	2:2
1959/60	Second League playoffs	Semifinals	Pelister Bitola	2:0	3:3
1959/60	Second League playoffs	Final	Rudar Kosovska Mitrovica	1:2	0:6
1962/63	Second League playoffs	Final	Pobeda Prilep	1:1	0:1
1963/64	Second League playoffs	Final	Teteks Tetovo	2:0	2:2
2017/18	First League playoffs	Final	Kom Podgorica	2:1	0:0
2018/19	First League playoffs	Final	Kom Podgorica	0:1	0:1

==== National Cup ====
FK Lovćen participated in 21 season of national Cup competition, since 1950. During their history, Budućnost played in Yugoslav Cup, FR Yugoslavia Cup and, since the 2006-07 season, in Montenegrin Cup.
Lovćen played three times in the final matches of national cup - (2008/09, 2013/14 and 2018/19). Club won one trophy, in the season 2013/14.

Season	Competition	Round	Match	Result
1950	Yugoslav Cup	Round one	Velež Mostar - Lovćen	5:1
1951	Yugoslav Cup	Round one	Lovćen - Budućnost Podgorica	2:0
1951	Yugoslav Cup	Round of 16	Velež Mostar - Lovćen	8:1
1952	Yugoslav Cup	Round one	Lovćen - Srem Sremska Mitrovica	2:0
1952	Yugoslav Cup	Round of 16	Lovćen - Partizan Beograd	0:3
1954	Yugoslav Cup	Round of 16	Lovćen - Spartak Subotica	0:4
1970/71	Yugoslav Cup	Round of 16	Lovćen - Dinamo Zagreb	1:2
1973	Yugoslav Cup	Round of 16	Maribor - Lovćen	4:0
1975/76	Yugoslav Cup	Round one	Lovćen - Proleter Zrenjanin	2:1
1975/76	Yugoslav Cup	Round of 16	Šumadija Aranđelovac - Lovćen	5:2
1985/86	Yugoslav Cup	Round one	Lovćen - Partizan Beograd	0:4
1988/89	Yugoslav Cup	Round one	Lovćen - Partizan Beograd	0:1
1993/94	FR Yugoslavia Cup	Round one	Bečej - Lovćen	3:0
2002/03	SCG Cup	Round one	Smederevo - Lovćen	3:1
2006/07	Montenegrin Cup	Round one	Zeta Golubovci - Lovćen	2:1
2007/08	Montenegrin Cup	Round one	Zabjelo Podgorica - Lovćen	0:0*
2007/08	Montenegrin Cup	Round of 16	Petrovac - Lovćen	2:0, 1:3
2008/09	Montenegrin Cup	Round one	Berane - Lovćen	1:1*
2008/09	Montenegrin Cup	Round of 16	Lovćen - Jezero Plav	2:0, 1:1
2008/09	Montenegrin Cup	Quarterfinals	Sutjeska Nikšić - Lovćen	1:0, 0:1*
2008/09	Montenegrin Cup	Semifinals	Budućnost Podgorica - Lovćen	1:2, 1:0
2008/09	Montenegrin Cup	FINAL	Lovćen - Petrovac	0:1
2009/10	Montenegrin Cup	Round of 16	Budućnost Podgorica - Lovćen	2:0, 2:0
2010/11	Montenegrin Cup	Round one	Bokelj Kotor - Lovćen	2:0
2011/12	Montenegrin Cup	Round one	Drezga - Lovćen	1:3
2011/12	Montenegrin Cup	Round of 16	Lovćen - Čelik Nikšić	0:1, 0:1
2012/13	Montenegrin Cup	Round one	Jezero Plav - Lovćen	0:2
2012/13	Montenegrin Cup	Round of 16	Igalo - Lovćen	1:1, 0:5
2012/13	Montenegrin Cup	Quarterfinals	Čelik Nikšić - Lovćen	2:0, 1:1
2013/14	Montenegrin Cup	Round one	Lovćen - Zora Spuž	1:0
2013/14	Montenegrin Cup	Round of 16	Crvena Stijena Podgorica - Lovćen	2:1, 0:8
2013/14	Montenegrin Cup	Quarterfinals	Lovćen - Zeta Golubovci	1:0, 1:2
2013/14	Montenegrin Cup	Semifinals	Petrovac - Lovćen	0:0, 0:3
2013/14	Montenegrin Cup	FINAL	Lovćen - Mladost Podgorica	1:0
2014/15	Montenegrin Cup	Round of 16	Lovćen - Rudar Pljevlja	0:0, 0:1
2014/15	Montenegrin Cup	Quarterfinals	Petrovac - Lovćen	1:0, 1:1
2015/16	Montenegrin Cup	Round one	Cetinje - Lovćen	1:2
2015/16	Montenegrin Cup	Round of 16	Lovćen - Mladost Lješkopolje	3:0, 2:3
2015/16	Montenegrin Cup	Quarterfinals	Lovćen - Mornar Bar	3:1, 3:0
2015/16	Montenegrin Cup	Semifinals	Budućnost Podgorica - Lovćen	2:0, 1:1
2016/17	Montenegrin Cup	Round one	Sloga Bar - Lovćen	0:6
2016/17	Montenegrin Cup	Round of 16	Brskovo Mojkovac - Lovćen	2:4, 0:1
2016/17	Montenegrin Cup	Quarterfinals	Iskra Danilovgrad - Lovćen	1:0, 2:1
2017/18	Montenegrin Cup	Round one	Sloga Radovići - Lovćen	1:6
2017/18	Montenegrin Cup	Round of 16	Lovćen - Berane	0:1, 2:1
2017/18	Montenegrin Cup	Quarterfinals	Igalo - Lovćen	0:1, 3:1
2018/19	Montenegrin Cup	Round one	Jedinstvo Bijelo Polje - Lovćen	0:2
2018/19	Montenegrin Cup	Round of 16	Lovćen - Dečić Tuzi	2:1, 1:1
2018/19	Montenegrin Cup	Quarterfinals	Mornar Bar - Lovćen	0:1, 0:3
2018/19	Montenegrin Cup	Semifinals	Lovćen - Petrovac	1:1, 4:0
2018/19	Montenegrin Cup	FINAL	Budućnost Podgorica - Lovćen	4:0
2018/19	Montenegrin Cup	Round of 16	Sutjeska Nikšić - Lovćen	4:0, 3:0

* - penalties

== See also ==
- FK Lovćen
- FK Lovćen in the First League
- FK Lovćen in European competitions
- Montenegrin clubs in Yugoslav football competitions (1946–2006)
- Cetinje
