= 2022–23 Montenegrin Second League =

Montenegrin Second League
- Season: 2022–23
- Dates: 14 August 2022 – 25 May 2023
- Matches played: 144
- Goals scored: 296 (2.06 per match)
- Top goalscorer: Željko Krstović (Mladost DG) (11 goals)
- Biggest home win: Podgorica 5–0 Otrant-Olympic (9 October 2022)
- Biggest away win: Mladost DG 0–4 Zeta (3 December 2022)
- Highest scoring: Kom 4–3 Podgorica (27 November 2022)

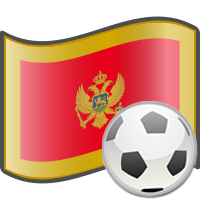
Soccer Montenegro

The 2022–23 Montenegrin Second League was the 17th season since the establishment of the Montenegrin Second League. The season ran from August 2022 to May 2023. That was the fifth season with 10 participating teams.

== Format of competition ==
A total of 10 teams participated in this edition of the Second League. The new members are Podgorica and Zeta, who were relegated from 2021–22 Montenegrin First League, and winners of Montenegrin Third League playoffs - Nikšić and Otrant-Olympic.

That was the fifth season of Second CFL with 10 participants. At the end of the season, the winner is automatically promoted to Montenegrin First League, while 2nd and 3rd placed teams play promotion play-offs, while 9th and 10th position lead to relegation to the Montenegrin Third League.

== Teams ==
The following 10 clubs compete in this season.

Locations of the 2022–23 teams

Club	City	Finishing in 2021–22	Stadium	Floodlights
Berane	Berane	7th	Berane City Stadium (6,500)	Yes
Bokelj	Kotor	4th	Stadion Pod Vrmcem (1,000)	Yes
Grbalj	Radanovići	8th	Stadion Donja Sutvara (1,500)	No
Igalo	Igalo	6th	Stadion Solila (1,600)	No
Kom	Podgorica	5th	Stadion Zlatica (1,200)	Yes
Mladost DG	Podgorica	3rd	DG Arena (4,300)	Yes
Nikšić	Nikšić	1st in Third League – Center	Stadion Trebjesa (300)	No
Otrant-Olympic	Ulcinj	1st in Third League – South	Stadion Olympic (1,500)	No
Podgorica	Podgorica	9th in First League	DG Arena (4,300)	Yes
Zeta	Golubovci	10th in First League	Stadion Trešnjica (4,000)	Yes

== League table ==
Pos	Team	Pld	W	D	L	GF	GA	GD	Pts	Promotion or relegation
1	Mladost DG (Note: Mladost DG were deducted 1 point.) (C, P)	32	16	6	10	38	38	0	53	Promotion to the First League
2	Kom	32	14	7	11	39	34	+5	49	Qualification for the promotion play-offs
3	Berane (Note: Berane were deducted 1 point.)	32	14	7	11	30	24	+6	48	Qualification for the promotion play-offs
4	Bokelj	32	12	11	9	34	27	+7	47	
5	Podgorica	32	11	11	10	36	33	+3	44	
6	Grbalj	32	10	9	13	26	29	−3	39	
7	Otrant-Olympic	32	9	11	12	32	38	−6	38	
8	Igalo	32	9	11	12	33	34	−1	38	
9	Zeta (R)	32	9	7	16	30	41	−11	34	Relegation to the Third League
10	Nikšić (Note: Nikšić withdrew from the league due to the financial reasons.) (R)	0	0	0	0	0	0	0	0	Relegation to the Third League

Source: Football Association of Montenegro (in Montenegrin)
Rules for classification: 1) Points; 2) Head-to-head points; 3) Head-to-head goal difference; 3) Head-to-head goals scored; 5) Head-to-head away goals scored; 6) Goal difference; 7) Goals scored; 8) Draw.
(C) Champions; (P) Promoted; (R) Relegated

== Results ==
=== First half of the season ===
Home \ Away	BER	BOK	GRB	IGA	KOM	MDG	NIK	OTR	POD	ZET
Berane	—	1–0	0–1	2–1	1–0	3–0	3–1	1–1	1–0	2–0
Bokelj	0–1	—	1–1	3–0	1–0	0–0	2–1	4–0	1–1	2–1
Grbalj	0–2	0–1	—	1–1	1–0	2–3	1–1	1–0	2–0	0–1
Igalo	1–1	0–1	1–2	—	1–1	0–0	1–0	1–1	0–2	1–0
Kom	1–0	3–0	0–0	2–1	—	3–2	0–0	1–0	4–3	1–2
Mladost DG	3–2	0–3	1–2	0–3	3–0	—	5–0	3–0	0–1	2–1
Nikšić	0–2	0–2	2–1	1–1	1–3	0–0	—	2–0	2–2	1–0
Otrant-Olympic	3–0	1–2	0–0	1–1	1–3	1–2	0–2	—	0–0	2–1
Podgorica	0–3	1–1	2–1	2–2	0–1	2–2	2–0	5–0	—	1–0
Zeta	0–0	0–0	2–1	1–4	0–2	0–2	3–1	2–0	2–3	—

Source: Football Association of Montenegro (in Montenegrin)
Legend: Blue = home team win; Yellow = draw; Red = away team win.

=== Second half of the season ===
Home \ Away	BER	BOK	GRB	IGA	KOM	MDG	NIK	OTR	POD	ZET
Berane	—	1–0	1–0	1–0	1–1	0–1	—	0–1	0–0	1–1
Bokelj	1–0	—	1–1	2–1	2–2	0–0	—	1–3	2–1	1–2
Grbalj	2–3	0–0	—	0–1	2–0	0–1	—	0–0	0–0	1–0
Igalo	1–1	2–1	1–0	—	2–1	0–0	3–1	0–0	1–0	1–1
Kom	0–1	0–0	0–1	2–1	—	2–1	—	1–2	3–1	2–0
Mladost DG	1–0	1–0	2–4	2–1	3–1	—	—	1–0	0–0	0–4
Nikšić	—	—	—	—	—	—	—	—	—	—
Otrant-Olympic	1–0	1–1	3–0	2–0	0–0	0–1	—	—	1–2	3–3
Podgorica	2–0	1–0	0–0	1–0	1–1	3–0	—	0–3	—	1–1
Zeta	1–0	1–2	1–0	0–3	0–1	0–1	—	1–1	1–0	—

Source: Football Association of Montenegro (in Montenegrin)
Legend: Blue = home team win; Yellow = draw; Red = away team win.

== Promotion play-offs ==
The 3rd-placed team (against the 10th-placed team of the First League) and the runners-up (against the 11th-placed team of the First League) will both compete in two-legged promotion play-offs after the end of the season.

=== Summary ===
Team 1	Agg.	Team 2	1st leg	2nd leg
Kom	1–3	Rudar	1–1	1–2
Mornar	4–0	Berane	2–0	2–0

=== Matches ===
30 May 2023
19:00 CEST

Kom	1–1	Rudar
Knežević 21' (pen.)	Report	Janketić 82'

Stadion Zlatica, Podgorica
Attendance: 350
Referee: Nikola Dabanović
3 June 2023
17:00 CEST

Rudar	2–1	Kom
Golubović 10'; Radojičić 19'	Report	Nishimura 90+2'

Gradski stadion, Pljevlja
Attendance: 500
Referee: Miloš Bešović

Rudar won 3–1 on aggregate.

30 May 2023
20:00 CEST

Mornar	2–0	Berane
Raičević 7'; Michael 65'	Report

Stadion Topolica, Bar
Attendance: 800
Referee: Savo Vujović
3 June 2023
19:00 CEST

Berane	0–2	Mornar
	Report	Bećiraj 40'; Ćetković 49'

Gradski stadion, Berane
Attendance: 1,000
Referee: Miloš Savović

Mornar won 4–0 on aggregate.

== Top scorers ==
Rank	Scorer	Club	Goals
1	(Montenegro) Željko Krstović	Mladost DG	11
2	(Montenegro) Stefan Čađenović	Berane	10
2	(Montenegro) Dejan Račić	Berane	10
2	(Montenegro) Igor Vukčević	Bokelj	10
5	(Montenegro) Lazar Knežević	Kom	9
5	(Montenegro) Balša Mrvaljević	Podgorica	9
5	(Montenegro) Filip Kalačević	Zeta	9
8	(Montenegro) Fatmir Molabećirović	Otrant-Olympic	8
