= Montenegrin First League playoffs =

The Montenegrin First League playoffs is a two legs tournament between the teams from Montenegrin First League just above direct relegation, and the teams from Montenegrin Second League just below direct promotion.

== Format ==
At the end of each season, 8th and 9th placed teams from the Montenegrin First League play against the 2nd and 3rd placed teams from the Montenegrin Second League. The winners play the next season in the First League, while losers are members of next edition of the Second League.

In every playoffs, matches are played over two legs - the 8th placed team from First League against the 3rd placed team from Second League, and the 9th placed team from First League against the 2nd placed team from Second League.

Before the season 2017-18, when the number of First League members was reduced to 10, the playoffs included the 10th and 11th placed teams from the First League.

== Participants ==
=== Participants by season ===
Below is the list of playoffs participants by every single season. The playoffs from 2006 are excluded, because the participants were teams from the Serbo-Montenegrin Second League and the Montenegrin Republic League.

†	Playoffs winner.

Season	First League Participants		Second League Participants	
2007	FK Dečić	FK Jedinstvo	FK Bokelj	FK Ibar
2008	FK Sutjeska	FK Bokelj	FK Jedinstvo	FK Čelik
2009	FK Dečić	FK Jezero	FK Mornar	FK Mladost
2010	FK Berane	FK Mornar	FK Bratstvo	OFK Bar
2011	FK Sutjeska	FK Mornar	FK Berane	FK Jedinstvo
2012	FK Dečić	FK Berane	FK Mornar	FK Jedinstvo
2013	FK Mogren	FK Mornar	FK Bokelj	FK Zabjelo
2014	FK Mogren	FK Mornar	FK Berane	FK Jezero
2015	FK Mornar	FK Mogren	FK Dečić	OFK Igalo
2016	FK Iskra	OFK Petrovac	FK Cetinje	FK Bratstvo
2017	OFK Petrovac	FK Rudar	FK Otrant	FK Ibar
2018	FK Kom	OFK Petrovac	FK Podgorica	FK Lovćen
2019	FK Rudar	FK Lovćen	FK Kom	FK Bokelj
2020	OFK Titograd	FK Kom	FK Jezero	FK Bokelj
2021	OFK Petrovac	FK Iskra	FK Arsenal	OFK Igalo
2022	FK Podgorica	FK Rudar	FK Arsenal	OFK Mladost DG
2023	FK Rudar	FK Mornar	FK Kom	FK Berane
2024	FK Jedinstvo	OFK Mladost DG	FK Otrant	FK Podgorica
2025	FK Arsenal	FK Jezero	FK Rudar	FK Lovćen

=== Teams ===
Club	Town	Ssn	PW	PL	First	Last	Pld	W	D	L	GD
FK Mornar	Bar	7	5	2	2009	2015	14	8	3	3	16:9
FK Bokelj	Kotor	5	1	4	2007	2020	10	3	1	6	7:10
OFK Petrovac	Petrovac	4	4	0	2016	2021	8	4	3	1	14:6
FK Dečić	Tuzi	4	3	1	2007	2015	8	4	2	2	12:6
FK Jedinstvo	Bijelo Polje	4	2	2	2007	2012	8	3	3	2	5:5
FK Berane	Berane	4	2	2	2010	2014	8	1	4	3	6:9
FK Rudar	Pljevlja	3	3	0	2017	2022	6	4	0	2	12:5
FK Mogren	Budva	3	2	1	2013	2015	6	4	0	2	16:10
OFK Titograd	Podgorica	3	2	1	2006	2020	6	3	0	3	6:5
FK Kom	Podgorica	3	1	2	2018	2020	6	3	1	2	5:5
FK Jezero	Plav	3	1	2	2009	2020	6	1	1	4	5:9
FK Iskra	Danilovgrad	2	2	0	2016	2021	4	3	1	0	11:3
FK Sutjeska	Nikšić	2	2	0	2008	2011	4	2	2	0	2:0
FK Arsenal	Tivat	2	1	1	2021	2022	4	2	1	1	8:4
FK Lovćen	Cetinje	2	1	1	2018	2019	4	1	1	2	2:3
OFK Igalo	Igalo	2	0	2	2015	2021	4	1	0	3	3:5
FK Ibar	Rožaje	2	0	2	2007	2017	4	0	2	2	3:8
FK Bratstvo	Zeta	2	0	2	2010	2016	4	0	1	3	3:11
FK Podgorica	Podgorica	2	0	2	2018	2022	4	0	2	2	3:10
OFK Bar	Bar	1	1	0	2010	2010	2	0	2	0	2:2
FK Otrant	Ulcinj	1	0	1	2017	2017	2	1	0	1	1:3
FK Čelik	Nikšić	1	0	1	2008	2008	2	0	1	1	0:1
FK Cetinje	Cetinje	1	0	1	2016	2016	2	0	1	1	0:1
FK Zora	Spuž	1	0	1	2006	2006	2	1	0	1	2:4
OFK Mladost DG	Podgorica	1	0	1	2022	2022	2	1	0	1	3:5
FK Zabjelo	Podgorica	1	0	1	2013	2013	2	0	0	2	2:9

== Results ==
=== 2006 ===
In the 2006 playoffs, FK Zora from Serbo-Montenegrin Second League played OFK Titograd from Montenegrin Republic League. Winner gained promotion to the inaugural season of the Montenegrin First League.

May 31, 2006

OFK Titograd	4 — 0	Zora

Stadion Cvijetni Brijeg, Podgorica
Attendance: 600
June 4, 2006

FK Zora	2 — 0	OFK Titograd

Spuž City Stadium, Spuž
Attendance: 400

OFK Titograd gained promotion to the 2006–07 Montenegrin First League, while Zora was relegated to the 2006–07 Montenegrin Second League.

=== 2007 ===
In 2007 playoffs, FK Dečić and FK Jedinstvo from the Montenegrin First League competed against FK Bokelj and FK Ibar from the Montenegrin Second League.

June 2, 2007

Jedinstvo	1 — 4	Bokelj

Gradski stadion, Bijelo Polje
Attendance: 3,000
June 9, 2007

Bokelj	0 — 1	Jedinstvo

Stadion Pod Vrmcem, Kotor
Attendance: 2,000

June 2, 2007

Ibar	2 — 2	Dečić

Berane City Stadium, Berane
Attendance: 2,000
June 9, 2007

Dečić	1 — 0	Ibar

Stadion Tuško Polje, Tuzi
Attendance: 1,500

Dečić remained a member of the First League, while Bokelj gained promotion to the 2007–08 Montenegrin First League. Ibar remained a member of the Second League, while Jedinstvo relegated to the 2007–08 Montenegrin Second League.

=== 2008 ===
In 2008 playoffs participated FK Sutjeska and FK Bokelj from Montenegrin First League against FK Jedinstvo and FK Čelik from Montenegrin Second League.

May 28, 2008

Bokelj	0 — 0	Jedinstvo

Stadion Pod Vrmcem, Kotor
Attendance: 1,200
June 1, 2008

Jedinstvo	1 — 0	Bokelj

Gradski stadion, Bijelo Polje
Attendance: 2,500

May 28, 2008

Sutjeska	1 — 0	Čelik

Stadion Kraj Bistrice, Nikšić
Attendance: 8,000
June 1, 2008

Čelik	0 — 0	Sutjeska

Stadion Kraj Bistrice, Nikšić
Attendance: 9,000

Sutjeska remained a member of First League, while Jedinstvo gained promotion to 2008–09 Montenegrin First League. Čelik remained a member of Second League, while Bokelj relegated to 2008–09 Montenegrin Second League.

=== 2009 ===
In 2009 playoffs participated FK Jezero and FK Dečić from Montenegrin First League against OFK Titograd and FK Mornar from Montenegrin Second League.

June 3, 2009

OFK Titograd	0 — 2	Dečić

Camp FSCG, Podgorica
Attendance: 1,200
June 7, 2009

Dečić	0 — 1	OFK Titograd

Stadion Tuško Polje, Tuzi
Attendance: 1,500

June 3, 2009

Mornar	2 — 1	Jezero

Stadion Topolica, Bar
Attendance: 1,500
June 7, 2009

Jezero	0 — 0	Mornar

Stadion Pod Racinom, Plav
Attendance: 3,000

Dečić remained a member of First League, while Mornar gained promotion to 2009–10 Montenegrin First League. OFK Titograd remained a member of Second League, while Jezero relegated to 2009–10 Montenegrin Second League.

=== 2010 ===
In 2010 playoffs FK Mornar and FK Berane from the Montenegrin First League competed against OFK Bar and FK Bratstvo from the Montenegrin Second League.

June 2, 2010

OFK Bar	1 — 1	Berane

Stadion Topolica, Bar
Attendance: 500
June 6, 2010

Berane	1 — 1 (pen) (4-5)	Bar

Berane City Stadium, Berane
Attendance: 4,000

June 2, 2010

Bratstvo	0 — 1	Mornar

Stadion Trešnjica, Golubovci
Attendance: 1,000
June 6, 2010

Mornar	2 — 1	Bratstvo

Stadion Topolica, Bar
Attendance: 1,000

Mornar remained a member of the First League, while OFK Bar gained promotion to the 2010–11 Montenegrin First League. Bratstvo remained a member of the Second League, while Berane was relegated to the 2010–11 Montenegrin Second League.

=== 2011 ===
In 2011 playoffs FK Mornar and Sutjeska from the Montenegrin First League competed against FK Berane and Jedinstvo from the Montenegrin Second League.

June 1, 2011

Jedinstvo	0 — 0	Sutjeska

Gradski stadion, Bijelo Polje
Attendance: 2,500
June 5, 2011

Sutjeska	1 — 0	Jedinstvo

Stadion Kraj Bistrice, Nikšić
Attendance: 3,000

June 1, 2011

Mornar	1 — 1	Berane

Stadion Topolica, Bar
Attendance: 1,000
June 5, 2011

Berane	(a) 0 — 0	Mornar

Berane City Stadium, Berane
Attendance: 3,500

Sutjeska remained a member of the First League, while Berane gained promotion to the 2011–12 Montenegrin First League. Jedinstvo remained a member of the Second League, while Mornar relegated to the 2011–12 Montenegrin Second League.

=== 2012 ===
In 2012 playoffs participated FK Dečić and FK Berane from Montenegrin First League against FK Mornar and Jedinstvo from Montenegrin Second League.

June 3, 2012

Dečić	0 — 0	Jedinstvo

Stadion Tuško Polje, Tuzi
Attendance: 1,500
June 7, 2012

Jedinstvo	2 — 0	Dečić

Gradski stadion, Bijelo Polje
Attendance: 3,500

June 3, 2012

Berane	1 — 2	Mornar

Berane City Stadium, Berane
Attendance: 2,000
June 7, 2012

Mornar	3 — 0	Berane

Stadion Topolica, Bar
Attendance: 3,000

Mornar and Jedinstvo gained promotion to the 2012–13 Montenegrin First League. Dečić and Berane were relegated to the 2012–13 Montenegrin Second League.

=== 2013 ===
In 2013 playoffs FK Mogren and FK Mornar from the Montenegrin First League competed against FK Bokelj and FK Zabjelo from the Montenegrin Second League.

June 5, 2013

Bokelj	1 — 0	Mornar

Stadion Pod Vrmcem, Kotor
Attendance: 1,000
June 9, 2013

Mornar	2 — 0	Bokelj

Stadion Topolica, Bar
Attendance: 2,000

June 5, 2013

Zabjelo	1 — 6	Mogren

Camp FSCG, Podgorica
Attendance: 2,000
June 9, 2013

Mogren	3 — 1	Zabjelo

Stadion Lugovi, Budva
Attendance: 300

Mogren and Mornar remained a members of the First League. Bokelj and Zabjelo remained a members of the Second League.

=== 2014 ===
In 2014 playoffs participated FK Mogren and FK Mornar from the Montenegrin First League against FK Berane and FK Jezero from the Montenegrin Second League.

June 4, 2014

Jezero	1 — 2	Mogren

Stadion Pod Racinom, Plav
Attendance: 3,000
June 8, 2014

Mogren	4 — 0	Jezero

Stadion Lugovi, Budva
Attendance: 500

June 4, 2014

Mornar	1 — 0	Berane

Stadion Topolica, Bar
Attendance: 1,200
June 8, 2014

Berane	2 — 0	Mornar

Berane City Stadium, Berane
Attendance: 5,000

Mogren remained a member of the First League, while Berane gained promotion to the 2014–15 Montenegrin First League. Jezero remained a member of the Second League, while Mornar was relegated to the 2014–15 Montenegrin Second League. As FK Čelik withdrew from the 2014–15 Montenegrin First League before the start of season, FK Mornar gained a wild-card to play in the First League.

=== 2015 ===
In 2015 playoffs FK Mogren and FK Mornar from the Montenegrin First League competed against FK Dečić and OFK Igalo from the Montenegrin Second League.

June 3, 2015

Mogren	0 — 5	Dečić

Stadion Mogren, Budva
Attendance: 700
June 6, 2015

Dečić	2 — 1	Mogren

Stadion Tuško Polje, Tuzi
Attendance: 1,000

June 3, 2015

Mornar	2 — 0	OFK Igalo

Stadion Topolica, Bar
Attendance: 600
June 6, 2015

OFK Igalo	2 — 0 (pen) (8-9)	Mornar

Stadion Solila, Igalo
Attendance: 1,500

Mornar remained a member of the First League, while Dečić gained promotion to the 2015–16 Montenegrin First League. OFK Igalo remained a member of the Second League, while Mogren was relegated to the 2015–16 Montenegrin Second League.

=== 2016 ===
In 2016 playoffs OFK Petrovac and FK Iskra from the Montenegrin First League against FK Cetinje and FK Bratstvo from the Montenegrin Second League.

June 2, 2016

Cetinje	0 — 0	OFK Petrovac

Stadion Obilića Poljana, Cetinje
Attendance: 1,000
June 6, 2016

OFK Petrovac	1 — 0	Cetinje

Stadion Pod Malim Brdom, Petrovac
Attendance: 800

June 2, 2016

Bratstvo	2 — 2	Iskra

Stadion Trešnjica, Golubovci
Attendance: 500
June 6, 2016

Iskra	6 — 0	Bratstvo

Braća Velašević Stadium, Danilovgrad
Attendance: 700

OFK Petrovac and Iskra remained a members of the First League. Cetinje and Bratstvo remained a members of the Second League.

=== 2017 ===
In 2017 playoffs OFK Petrovac and FK Rudar from the Montenegrin First League against FK Ibar and FK Otrant from the Montenegrin Second League.

May 31, 2017

Otrant	1 — 0	Rudar

Stadion Olympic, Ulcinj
Attendance: 2,000
June 4, 2017

Rudar	3 — 0	Otrant

Stadion Pod Golubinjom, Pljevlja
Attendance: 3,000

May 31, 2017

OFK Petrovac	4 — 0	Ibar

Stadion Pod Malim Brdom, Petrovac
Attendance: 400
June 4, 2017

Ibar	1 — 1	OFK Petrovac

Bandžovo Brdo Stadium, Rožaje
Attendance: 2,500

OFK Petrovac and Rudar remained a members of the First League. Otrant and Ibar remained a members of the Second League.

=== 2018 ===
In 2018 playoffs FK Kom and OFK Petrovac from Montenegrin First League against FK Podgorica and FK Lovćen from Montenegrin Second League.

May 30, 2018

Kom	0 — 0	Lovćen

Stadion Zlatica, Podgorica
Attendance: 1,000
June 3, 2018

Lovćen	2 — 1	Kom

Stadion Trešnjica, Golubovci
Attendance: 1,500

May 30, 2018

FK Podgorica	0 — 3	OFK Petrovac

Stadion Stari Ribnjak, Podgorica
Attendance: 1,000
June 3, 2018

OFK Petrovac	2 — 2	FK Podgorica

Stadion Pod Malim Brdom, Petrovac
Attendance: 500

OFK Petrovac remained a member of the First League, while Lovćen gained promotion to the 2018–19 Montenegrin First League. Podgorica remained a member of the Second League, while Kom relegated to the 2018–19 Montenegrin Second League.

=== 2019 ===
In 2019 playoffs FK Rudar and FK Lovćen from the Montenegrin First League competed against FK Kom and FK Bokelj from the Montenegrin Second League.

May 29, 2019

Bokelj	0 — 2	Rudar

Stadion pod Vrmcem, Kotor
Attendance: 1,000
June 2, 2019

Rudar	2 — 1	Bokelj

Stadion Pod Golubinjom, Pljevlja
Attendance: 800

June 04, 2019

Lovćen	0 — 1	Kom

Stadion pod Vrmcem, Kotor
Attendance: 800
June 10, 2018

Kom	1 — 0	Lovćen

Stadion Zlatica, Podgorica
Attendance: 1,500

Rudar remained a member of the First League, while Kom gained promotion to the 2019–20 Montenegrin First League. Bokelj remained a member of the Second League, while Lovćen relegated to the 2019–20 Montenegrin Second League.

=== 2020 ===
In 2020 playoffs OFK Titograd and FK Kom from Montenegrin First League competed against FK Jezero and FK Bokelj from the Montenegrin Second League. All the games were played without fans, due to the COVID-19 pandemic.

July 10, 2020

Kom	1 — 0	Jezero

Stadion Zlatica, Podgorica
Attendance: W/A
July 14, 2020

Jezero	3 — 1	Kom

Stadion Pod Racinom, Plav
Attendance: W/A

July 10, 2020

Titograd	0 — 1	Bokelj

Mladost Stadium, Podgorica
Attendance: W/A
July 14, 2020

Bokelj	0 — 1 (pen) (4-5)	Titograd

Stadion Pod Vrmcem, Kotor
Attendance: W/A

Titograd remained a member of the First League, while Jezero gained promotion to the 2020–21 Montenegrin First League. Bokelj remained a member of the Second League, while Kom relegated to the 2020–21 Montenegrin Second League.

=== 2021 ===
In 2021 playoffs OFK Petrovac and FK Iskra from the Montenegrin First League competed against FK Arsenal and FK Igalo from the Montenegrin Second League.

June 1, 2021

OFK Petrovac	2 — 1	Arsenal

Stadion pod Malim brdom, Petrovac
Attendance: 600
June 6, 2021

Arsenal	2 — 1 (pen) (5-6)	OFK Petrovac

Stadion u Parku, Tivat
Attendance: 1,500

June 1, 2021

Iskra	2 — 1	Igalo

Braća Velašević Stadium, Danilovgrad
Attendance: 500
June 6, 2021

Igalo	0 — 1	Iskra

Stadion Solila, Igalo
Attendance: 1,000

OFK Petrovac and Iskra remained a members of First League. Arsenal and Igalo remained a members of Second League.

=== 2022 ===
In 2022 playoffs FK Podgorica and FK Rudar from the Montenegrin First League competed against OFK Mladost DG and FK Arsenal from the Montenegrin Second League.

May 30, 2022

Mladost DG	1 — 4	Rudar

DG Arena, Podgorica
Attendance: 500
June 3, 2022

Rudar	1 — 2	Mladost DG

Stadion Pod Golubinjom, Pljevlja
Attendance: 700

May 30, 2022

Arsenal	4 — 0	Podgorica

Stadion u Parku, Tivat
Attendance: 1,500
June 3, 2022

Podgorica	1 — 1	Arsenal

DG Arena, Podgorica
Attendance: 1,000

Rudar remained a member of the First League, while Arsenal gained promotion to the 2022–23 Montenegrin First League. Mladost DG remained a member of the Second League, while Podgorica relegated to the 2022–23 Montenegrin Second League.

=== 2023 ===
In 2023 playoffs FK Mornar and FK Rudar from the Montenegrin First League competed against FK Kom and FK Berane from the Montenegrin Second League.

May 30, 2023

Kom	1 — 1	Rudar

Stadion Zlatica, Podgorica
Attendance: 350
June 3, 2023

Rudar	2 — 1	Kom

Stadion Pod Golubinjom, Pljevlja
Attendance: 500

May 30, 2023

Mornar	2 — 0	Berane

Stadion Topolica, Bar
Attendance: 800
June 3, 2023

Berane	0 — 2	Mornar

Berane City Stadium, Berane
Attendance: 1,000

Rudar and Mornar remained a members of First League. Kom and Berane remained a members of Second League.
