= Igor Nikić =

Montenegrin footballer

Personal information
- Date of birth: 25 August 2000 (age 26)
- Place of birth: Kotor, FR Yugoslavia
- Height: 1.95 m (6 ft 5 in)
- Position: Goalkeeper

Team information
- Current team: Argeș Pitești
- Number: 77

Youth career
- Bokelj Kotor
- –2021: Podgorica

Senior career*
Years	Team	Apps	(Gls)
2021–2022	Podgorica	4	(0)
2021–2022	Mladost DG	31	(0)
2022–2023	Arsenal Tivat	36	(0)
2023–2025	Dečić	65	(0)
2025–2026	Mirandés	17	(0)
2026–	Argeș Pitești	6	(0)

International career^{‡}
2024–	Montenegro	9	(0)
- * Club domestic league appearances and goals as of 6 November 2026 ‡ National team caps and goals as of 17 November 2025

Igor Nikić (Montenegrin: Игор Никић; born 25 August 2000) is a Montenegrin professional footballer who plays as a goalkeeper for Liga I club Argeș Pitești and the Montenegro national team.

== Club career ==
Born in Kotor, Nikić played for Bokelj Kotor as a youth before joining the structure of Podgorica. He made his first team – and Montenegrin First League – debut on 19 May 2021, starting in a 4–0 home loss to Sutjeska Nikšić.

Ahead of the 2021–22 season, Nikić became a member of affiliate team Mladost Donja Gorica in the Montenegrin Second League, but also featured with Podgorica's first team. In July 2022, he signed for Arsenal Tivat also in the top tier.

On 5 June 2023, Nikić joined Dečić. In November 2024, he was reportedly a target of Ajax, but nothing came of it.

On 12 August 2025, Nikić moved abroad for the first time in his career, signing a two-year contract with Spanish Segunda División side Mirandés.

== International career ==
On 31 May 2024, Nikić was called up to the Montenegro national team by manager Robert Prosinečki for two friendlies against Belgium and Georgia. He made his full international debut on 11 October, starting in a 1–0 loss to Turkey in the third round of the 2024–25 UEFA Nations League B.

== Career statistics ==
=== Club ===
As of match played 6 November 2026

Club	Season	League			National cup (Note: Includes Montenegrin Cup)		Europe		Other		Total	
Club	Season	Division	Apps	Goals	Apps	Goals	Apps	Goals	Apps	Goals	Apps	Goals
Podgorica	2020–21	Montenegrin First League	1	0	–		–		–		1	0
Podgorica	2021–22	Montenegrin First League	3	0	1	0	–		1 (Note: Appearances in Montenegrin First League promotion/relegation play-offs)	0	5	0
Podgorica	Total		4	0	1	0	–		1	0	6	0
Mladost DG	2021–22	Montenegrin Second League	31	0	–		–		–		31	0
Arsenal Tivat	2022–23	Montenegrin First League	36	0	4	0	–		–		40	0
Dečić	2022–23	Montenegrin First League	35	0	4	0	–		–		39	0
Dečić	2024–25	Montenegrin First League	29	0	3	0	6 (Note: Two appearances in UEFA Champions League, four appearances UEFA Conference League)	0	–		38	0
Dečić	2025–26	Montenegrin First League	1	0	–		4 (Note: Appearances in UEFA Conference League)	0	–		5	0
Dečić	Total		65	0	7	0	10	0	–		82	0
Mirandés	2025–26	Segunda División	17	0	0	0	–		–		17	0
Argeș Pitești	2026–27	Liga I	6	0	0	0	–		–		6	0
Career total			159	0	12	0	10	0	1	0	182	0

=== International ===
As of match played 17 November 2025

Appearances and goals by national team and year
National team	Year	Apps	Goals
Montenegro
Montenegro	2024	4	0
Montenegro	2025	5	0
Montenegro	2026	0	0
Total		9	0

== Honours ==
Arsenal Tivat

- Montenegrin Cup runner-up: 2022–23

Dečić

- Montenegrin First League: 2023–24
- Montenegrin Cup: 2024–25
