= Agović =

Agović is a surname. Notable people with the surname include:

- Jasmin Agović (born 1991), Montenegrin footballer
- Vanesa Agović (born 1996), Montenegrin handball player
