= Damjan Mugoša =

Montenegrin footballer (born 2003)

Personal information
- Full name: Damjan Mugoša
- Date of birth: 16 May 2003 (age 23)
- Place of birth: Podgorica, Serbia and Montenegro
- Position: Winger

Team information
- Current team: BSK Bijelo Brdo
- Number: 8

Youth career
- 2014–2015: Ris
- 2015–2016: Zora
- 2016: Ris
- 2016–2019: Mladost Lj. (then)

Senior career*
| Years | Team | Apps | (Gls) |
| 2019–2023 | Budućnost Podgorica | 3 | (0) |
| 2021–2022 | → Mladost DG (loan) | 30 | (9) |
| 2023 | → GOŠK Gabela (loan) | 13 | (0) |
| 2023–2025 | Arsenal Tivat | 55 | (7) |
| 2025– | BSK Bijelo Brdo | 55 | (7) |

International career
| 2021 | Montenegro U19 | 9 | (0) |
| 2022– | Montenegro U21 | 6 | (0) |
- * Club domestic league appearances and goals as of 17 June 2026

Damjan Mugoša (born 16 May 2003) is a Montenegrin professional footballer who plays for Croatian club BSK Bijelo Brdo.

During his career, Mugoša also played on loan for Mladost DG and GOŠK Gabela.
