= Ermin Seratlić =

Montenegrin footballer

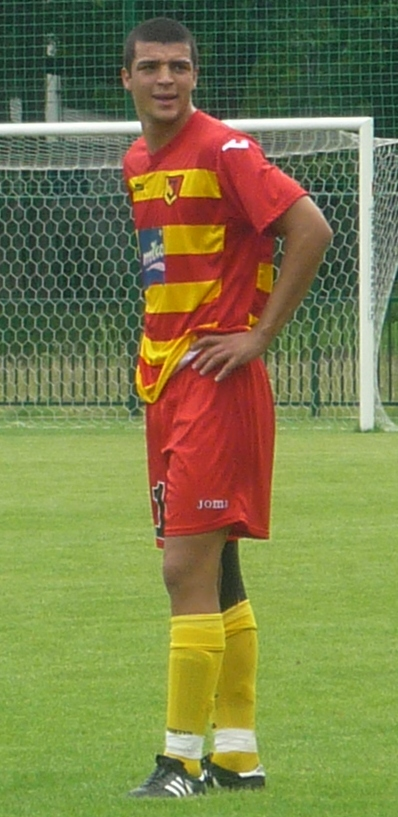

Personal information
- Full name: Ermin Seratlić
- Date of birth: 21 August 1990 (age 36)
- Place of birth: Titograd, SFR Yugoslavia
- Height: 1.85 m (6 ft 1 in)
- Position: Midfielder

Team information
- Current team: Otrant
- Number: 18

Senior career*
| Years | Team | Apps | (Gls) |
| 2007–2010 | Mladost Podgorica | | (16) |
| 2011–2013 | Jagiellonia | 26 | (3) |
| 2012–2013 | → Mladost Podgorica (loan) | 36 | (3) |
| 2014 | Dečić | 11 | (0) |
| 2015 | Radnik Bijeljina | 24 | (1) |
| 2016–2017 | Budućnost Podgorica | 13 | (0) |
| 2017–2019 | Mladost Lješkopolje | 51 | (3) |
| 2019–2020 | Rudar Pljevlja | 29 | (1) |
| 2020–2025 | Mornar Bar | 125 | (3) |
| 2025– | Otrant | 30 | (1) |

International career
| 2011-2012 | Montenegro U21 | 11 | (2) |
- * Club domestic league appearances and goals as of 18 June 2026

Ermin Seratlić (born 21 August 1990) is a Montenegrin professional footballer who plays as a midfielder for Otrant.

== Playing career ==
=== Club ===
In January 2011, he joined Jagiellonia Białystok on a four-year contract. He left Mladost Lješkopolje in summer 2019 and later played for FK Rudar Pljevlja, but left them in summer 2020.

=== International ===
He was a part of the Montenegro national under-21 team.

== Honours ==
Budućnost Podgorica

- Montenegrin First League: 2016–17
