= FK Lovćen in European competitions =

For the first time in the history, Football Club Lovćen Cetinje gained a participation in the European competitions after the season 2013/14. As a Montenegrin Cup winner and the runner-up in the Montenegrin First League, Lovćen debuted in Europa League 2014/15. The club's home ground is at Stadion Obilica Poljana.

== Appearances ==
During their first season in Europe, Lovćen played in the first qualifying leg of Europa League 2014/15. Their first opponent was Željezničar Sarajevo from Bosnia and Herzegovina. After the draw in the first match in Sarajevo (0:0), Lovćen lost the second game in Petrovac (0:1).

Season	Competition	Round	Club	Home	Away	Agg.
2014–15	UEFA Europa League	1Q	(Bosnia and Herzegovina) Željezničar Sarajevo	0–1	0–0	0–1

== See also ==
- FK Lovćen
- FK Lovćen in the First League
- List of FK Lovćen seasons
- Cetinje
