= Miedź Legnica II =

Polish football club

- Full name: Miejski Klub Sportowy; Miedź Legnica SA
- Nickname: Miedzianka
- Founded: 14 September 1971; 54 years ago
- Ground: Stadion im. Orła Białego
- Capacity: 6,244
- Chairman: Tomasz Brusiło
- Manager: Marcin Garuch
- League: III liga, group III
- 2025–26: III liga, group III, 13th of 18
- Website: miedzlegnica.eu
Home colours	Away colours

Miedź Legnica II is a Polish football team, which serves as the reserve side of Miedź Legnica. They compete in group III of the III liga, the fourth tier of Polish football, after winning the 2023–24 IV liga Lower Silesia.

The club participated in the Polish Cup in the 2016–17 and 2023–24 seasons.

== Honours ==
From the 2003–04 season onwards

- IV liga
  - Legnica
    - Champions: 2005–06
  - Lower Silesia
    - Champions: 2014–15, 2023–24
- Klasa A Legnica II
  - Champions: 2004–05
- Klasa B Legnica V
  - Runners-up: 2003–04
- Polish Cup (Lower Silesia regionals)
  - Winners: 2015–16, 2022–23
- Polish Cup (Legnica regionals)
  - Winners: 2007–08, 2011–12, 2015–16, 2022–23, 2024–25
  - Runners-up: 2009–10, 2013–14, 2021–22 2023–24
- Lower Silesia Super Cup
  - Winners: 2024, 2025

== Polish Cup records ==
Season	Round	Opponent	Result
2016–17	Preliminary round	GKS Bełchatów	1–4
2023–24	First round	Stal Rzeszów	0–3
