= OFK Nikšić =

- Full name: Omladinski Fudbalski Klub Nikšić
- Founded: 2004; 21 years ago
- Ground: Stadion pod Trebjesom, Nikšić, Montenegro
- Capacity: 300
- Chairman: Dragan Marojević
- League: Montenegrin Third League
- 2022–23: Montenegrin Second League, 10th (relegated)
| Home colours | Away colours |

OFK Nikšić is a Montenegrin football club based in Nikšić, founded in 2004. In the 2022–23 season, the club was competed in the Montenegrin Second League, where after the end of the autumn part of the season he voluntarily withdrew from the competition under suspicious circumstances, which was judged by the football public to be the result of corruption. The Prosecutor's Office of Montenegro and the Police Directorate did not conduct an investigation based on these accusations, and the Football Association punished club by being returned to the Third League and unable to promote to a higher level for two seasons.

== History ==
The club was founded in 2004, and from then until 2022, they competed in the Montenegrin Third League, when for the first time he won a place in a higher ranking competition. In addition to the senior team, OFK Nikšić has selections of roosters and pioneers from other categories. Since its inception, the club has produced a large number of professional footballers who gained recognition in bigger Montenegrin clubs, as well as abroad.

== Honours and achievements ==
- Montenegrin Third League – 1
  - winners (1): 2021-22
