= Jasmin Agović =

Montenegrin footballer (born 1991)

Personal information
- Date of birth: 13 February 1991 (age 35)
- Place of birth: Titograd, SFR Yugoslavia
- Height: 1.93 m (6 ft 4 in)
- Position: Goalkeeper

Team information
- Current team: Otrant-Olympic
- Number: 1

Senior career*
| Years | Team | Apps | (Gls) |
| 2010–2016 | Budućnost | 127 | (0) |
| 2016–2017 | Vllaznia | 22 | (0) |
| 2017–2018 | Rudar | 31 | (0) |
| 2019–2020 | Podgorica | 31 | (0) |
| 2021–2022 | Rudar | 33 | (0) |
| 2023– | Otrant-Olympic | 74 | (0) |

International career
| 2010–2011 | Montenegro U-19 | 2 | (0) |
| 2012–2013 | Montenegro U-21 | 1 | (0) |
- * Club domestic league appearances and goals as of 1 June 2026

Jasmin Agović (born 13 February 1991) is a Montenegrin footballer who plays for Otrant-Olympica as a goalkeeper.
