= Zvonko Ceklić =

Montenegrin association footballer

Personal information
- Full name: Zvonko Ceklić
- Date of birth: 11 April 1999 (age 27)
- Place of birth: Podgorica, FR Yugoslavia
- Height: 1.89 m (6 ft 2 in)
- Positions: Left-back; centre-back

Team information
- Current team: Mladost DG
- Number: 6

Youth career
- Zeta

Senior career*
Years	Team	Apps	(Gls)
2017–2018	→ FK Bratstvo (loan)		
2018–2022	Zeta	101	(1)
2022	FK Bokelj		
2022	FC Turan	8	(0)
2023	Zemplín Michalovce	6	(0)
2023–2024	Budućnost	2	(0)
2024	→ Mladost DG (loan)	3	(0)
2025–	Mladost DG	20	(0)

International career^{‡}
2016	Montenegro U17	2	(0)
2017	Montenegro U19	0	(0)
2019	Montenegro U21	1	(0)
- * Club domestic league appearances and goals as of 17 June 2026 ‡ National team caps and goals as of 10 October 2019

Zvonko Ceklić (Cyrillic: Звонко Цеклић; born 11 April 1999) is a Montenegrin footballer who plays for Mladost DG.

== Club career ==
=== MFK Zemplín Michalovce ===
Ceklić made his Slovak league debut for Zemplín Michalovce in an away fixture against MFK Ružomberok on 11 February 2023.
