= Marcin Garuch =

Polish footballer (born 1988)

Personal information
- Date of birth: 14 September 1988 (age 38)
- Place of birth: Legnica, Poland
- Height: 1.54 m (5 ft 1 in)
- Position: Midfielder

Team information
- Current team: Miedź Legnica II (manager)

Youth career
- Cicha Woda Tyniec Legnicki
- Miedź Legnica

Senior career*
Years	Team	Apps	(Gls)
2007–2016	Miedź Legnica	226	(27)
2012–2013	→ Chojniczanka (loan)	29	(8)
2015	Miedź Legnica II	4	(0)
2016–2017	OFK Grbalj	26	(1)
2017–2018	GKS Bełchatów	28	(1)
2018–2025	Miedź Legnica II	133	(29)
2020–2025	Miedź Legnica	38	(1)
Total		484	(67)

Managerial career
- 2025–: Miedź Legnica II
- * Club domestic league appearances and goals

Marcin Garuch (born 14 September 1988) is a Polish football coach and former professional footballer who played as a midfielder. He currently serves as the head coach of III liga club Miedź Legnica II. Garuch was known to be the shortest professional footballer in Europe.

== Career ==
Garuch started his senior career with Miedź Legnica. In 2012, he was loaned to Chojniczanka Chojnice. On 28 May 2023, the last matchday of the 2022–23 season, Garuch made his Ekstraklasa debut in a goalless draw against Górnik Zabrze, becoming the shortest player to ever feature in the Polish top division.

== Managerial statistics ==
As of match played 30 May 2026

Managerial record by team and tenure
Team	From	To	Record							
Team	From	To	G	W	D	L	GF	GA	GD	Win %
Miedź Legnica II	20 September 2025	Present	28	13	7	8	56	38	+18	46.43
Total			28	13	7	8	56	38	+18	46.43

== Honours ==
Miedź Legnica

- I liga: 2021–22
- II liga West: 2011–12

Miedź Legnica II

- IV liga Lower Silesia: 2023–24
- Polish Cup (Lower Silesia regionals): 2022–23 2024–25
- Polish Cup (Legnica regionals): 2022–23, 2024–25
- Lower Silesia Super Cup: 2024
