= Rodrigo Faust =

Argentine footballer

Personal information
- Full name: Rodrigo Emilio Faust
- Date of birth: 14 September 1995 (age 31)
- Place of birth: Villa Madero, Argentina
- Height: 1.86 m (6 ft 1 in)
- Position: Forward

Team information
- Current team: Mladost DG
- Number: 9

Senior career*
Years	Team	Apps	(Gls)
2017–2018	Huracán	0	(0)
2017–2018	→ UAI Urquiza (loan)	11	(0)
2018–2019	San Miguel		
2019	Atlético Paraná	7	(1)
2019–2022	Excursionistas		
2022	Jezero	16	(12)
2022–2023	Petrovac	26	(8)
2023–2024	Olancho	12	(2)
2024	Teuta Durrës	15	(0)
2024–2025	Petrovac	19	(3)
2025–	Mladost DG	28	(4)
- * Club domestic league appearances and goals as of 17 June 2026

Rodrigo Emilio Faust (born 14 September 1995) is an Argentine footballer who plays as a forward for Montenegrin club Mladost DG.

== Career ==
Faust started his senior career with Primera División side Huracán in 2017. On 7 July, he signed his first professional contract with the club. A month later, on 7 August, Faust was loaned out to UAI Urquiza of Primera B Metropolitana. His first match for UAI Urquiza arrived on 3 September in a goalless draw versus Estudiantes. In July 2018, Faust completed a permanent move to fellow Primera B Metropolitana team San Miguel. He didn't make a competitive appearance for San Miguel, departing on 10 January 2019 to join Atlético Paraná in Torneo Federal A.

== Career statistics ==
As of 11 January 2019.

Club statistics
Club	Season	League			Cup		Continental		Other		Total	
Club	Season	Division	Apps	Goals	Apps	Goals	Apps	Goals	Apps	Goals	Apps	Goals
Huracán	2017–18	Primera División	0	0	0	0	0	0	0	0	0	0
UAI Urquiza (loan)	2017–18	Primera B Metropolitana	11	0	0	0	—		0	0	11	0
San Miguel	2018–19	Primera B Metropolitana	0	0	0	0	—		0	0	0	0
Atlético Paraná	2018–19	Torneo Federal A	11	0	0	0	—		0	0	11	0
Career total			11	0	0	0	0	0	0	0	11	0
