= FK Lovćen in the First League =

Season of football team

FK Lovćen Cetinje
- Full name: Fudbalski klub Lovćen Cetinje
- Nicknames: Orlovi (Eagles), Crveni (Reds)
- Founded: 1913; 113 years ago
- Ground: Sveti Petar Cetinjski; Cetinje, Montenegro
- Capacity: 5,192
- Manager: Mojaš Radonjić
- League: First League
- 2013–14: 2nd
- Website: http://www.fklovcen.me/
Home colours	Away colours

Active sport clubs of Lovćen
Football	Handball	Basketball
Table tennis	Athletics	Tennis
Car racing	Boxing	Cycling	

FK Lovćen is a permanent member of the Montenegrin First League since 2007. Their greatest success in the First League was 2nd place with 59 points during the season 2013/14.

== Records ==
- Largest victory: 6:0, Lovćen – Petrovac, 30 April 2017, Cetinje
- Largest defeat: 1:6, Lovćen – Sutjeska, 1 December 2012, Cetinje; 5:0, Budućnost - Lovćen, 19 November 2016, Podgorica; 7:2, Mladost - Lovćen, 27 May 2017, Podgorica
- Longest unbeaten streak: 11 matches, (6 December 2013 − 3 May 2014)
- Longest winning streak: 7 matches, (6 December 2013 − 19 April 2014)
- Longest streak without win: 12 matches, (29 September 2012 − 9 March 2013)
- Longest losing streak: 7 matches, (3 November 2012 − 9 March 2013)

== Appearances ==
First match in the First League, Lovćen played at 11 August 2007. against OFK Petrovac in Cetinje - 2:2, with attendance od 2,000 supporters. In their first season in the First League Lovćen finished sixth. That was a big success for a club which debuted in the First League.

During the season 2008/09, Lovćen finished as eight team in the championship, but they made good result in the Montenegrin Cup, as a runner-up. One year after, Lovćen finished at sixth place, and at the end of 2010/11 season, Lovćen finished eighth.

Difficult times for Lovćen came at the 2011/12 season, but after long struggle, Lovćen survived in the First League, with the final placement at the sixth place. Next year, club from Cetinje again made a row of bad results, but at the end finished as a ninth team in the League.

The most successful season in the club's history was 2013/14. After the first half-season, club from Cetinje finished third. During the spring-season, the club made a historical run of 11 matches without a loss (7 consecutive wins) and Lovćen ran for the champions title. Lovćen finished season at the second place.

At the same season, on 21 May 2014, for the first time in club's history, Lovćen won the trophy of Montenegrin Cup winner. During the Montenegrin Cup 2014, Lovćen eliminated Zora (1:0), Crvena stijena (8:0, 1:2), Zeta (1:0, 1:2) and Petrovac (3:0, 0:0). In the finals, Lovćen won the game against Mladost, so the club from Cetinje won their first national trophy in history. With that success, for the first time in the club's history, Lovćen qualified for the European Cups.

== Final placement by seasons ==
Country	Season	League	Position	G	W	D	L	GD	PTS
(Montenegro)	2007/08	First League	6.	33	11	10	12	28:30	43
(Montenegro)	2008/09	First League	8.	33	10	10	13	25:25	40
(Montenegro)	2009/10	First League	6.	33	15	7	11	32:37	52
(Montenegro)	2010/11	First League	8.	33	9	10	14	29:36	37
(Montenegro)	2011/12	First League	6.	33	10	10	13	34:42	40
(Montenegro)	2012/13	First League	9.	33	11	4	18	38:51	37
(Montenegro)	2013/14	First League	2.	33	17	8	8	52:31	59
(Montenegro)	2014/15	First League	6.	33	15	5	13	42:32	50
(Montenegro)	2015/16	First League	9.	33	9	9	15	32:42	36
(Montenegro)	2016/17	First League	11.	33	10	7	16	25:36	37
Overall				330	117	80	133	337:362	431

== Opponents ==
=== Matches by seasons ===
During their participations in the First League, Lovćen played against 17 different opponents.

Opponent	2007/08			2008/09			2009/10			2010/11			2011/12			2012/13			2013/14			2014/15			2015/16			2016/17		
OFK Bar										5:2	0:1	1:0																		
Berane							2:1	2:1	0:1				1:1	1:2	2:0							5:0	2:0	2:0						
Bokelj	1:1	0:0	0:1										1:1	2:1	1:1							1:0	4:1	1:1	1:2	0:1	1:2	2:0	0:0	1:0
Budućnost	0:1	0:1	0:0	3:0	1:1	0:2	1:2	1:3	0:4	1:3	0:2	0:1	0:2	0:4	1:0	1:3	1:2	3:0	1:2	2:0	0:1	3:2	0:2	0:0	2:2	0:0	0:4	0:5	0:2	1:0
Čelik																0:3	1:1	3:1	0:2	1:0	1:1									
Dečić	0:1	0:2	0:0	2:0	2:0	0:0	1:2	1:1	1:0	1:0	0:1	0:2	0:3	0:0	3:1				0:0	1:1	4:2				0:0	2:3	2:1	1:2	0:0	0:1
OFK Grbalj	3:2	0:2	0:2	1:1	0:0	1:0	0:4	0:0	2:1	0:0	1:0	0:1	0:0	0:0	2:0	0:0	0:1	0:3	4:0	0:0	3:2	1:0	1:1	1:0	3:1	0:0	0:2	2:1	0:2	3:0
Iskra																									0:0	4:1	2:2	1:0	0:1	0:0
Jedinstvo				2:1	2:0	0:1										0:1	0:3	2:0										2:0	2:0	1:0
Jezero				1:2	0:1	0:0																								
Kom	0:0	4:0	1:0	0:0	2:0	1:2	1:0	0:0	2:1																					
Mladost	1:0	2:0	1:0							0:0	1:1	2:2	0:2	2:2	3:1	2:3	0:0	5:0	2:0	1:0	4:2	0:1	0:1	0:1	0:2	1:2	0:1	0:0	0:0	2:7
Mogren	1:0	0:1	0:4	1:1	0:2	0:0	3:1	0:0	0:1	0:1	0:0	0:1	0:1	0:2	2:1	1:3	1:0	2:1	1:3	3:2	1:2	2:1	1:0	2:0						
Mornar							1:0	1:1	0:1	1:2	2:2	1:0				2:1	1:2	2:0	1:0	1:2	1:1	3:1	5:1	2:0	3:1	1:0	1:0			
OFK Petrovac	2:2	1:1	1:1	0:1	1:0	1:1	2:0	1:0	1:0	0:1	0:0	3:2	2:3	0:2	0:1	1:2	1:1	0:1	0:1	1:1	2:1	0:1	0:1	0:2	1:0	1:2	1:0	0:1	0:1	6:0
Rudar	1:0	0:2	2:1	0:1	0:2	2:0	1:0	0:3	0:3	1:1	1:0	2:2	1:1	1:3	2:1	0:1	0:3	2:1	2:1	2:1	1:0	0:1	0:2	0:0	1:1	1:1	0:1	0:0	1:1	0:2
Sutjeska	1:1	4:1	0:1	0:0	0:1	0:2	0:0	1:1	3:2	1:1	2:1	2:0	2:0	0:0	1:0	0:2	1:6	1:2	0:0	3:0	1:1	1:2	0:2	0:3	0:2	0:0	1:4	0:1	0:2	0:2
Zeta	0:1	1:1	1:1	1:2	1:0	0:1	2:1	1:2	1:0	0:2	0:2	1:2	0:3	0:0	2:3	2:0	0:2	3:2	0:1	4:1	4:0	1:1	3:2	1:2	1:2	2:0	0:2	0:1	0:1	0:3

=== Scores ===
Overall						Home					Away				
Opponent	G	W	D	L	GD	G	W	D	L	GD	G	W	D	L	GD
OFK Bar	3	2	0	1	6:3	2	1	0	1	1:1	1	1	0	0	5:2
Berane	9	6	1	2	17:6	5	4	1	0	9:2	4	2	0	2	8:4
Bokelj	15	5	6	4	16:12	7	3	2	2	11:7	8	2	4	2	5:5
Budućnost	30	6	5	19	22:51	14	4	3	7	13:16	16	2	2	12	9:35
Čelik	6	2	2	2	6:8	3	0	1	2	1:6	3	2	1	0	5:2
Dečić	24	7	8	9	21:23	13	5	7	1	14:8	11	2	1	8	7:15
OFK Grbalj	30	12	10	8	28:26	15	11	4	0	24:8	15	1	6	8	4:18
Iskra	6	2	3	1	7:4	4	2	2	0	7:3	2	0	1	1	0:1
Jedinstvo	9	6	0	3	11:6	5	3	0	2	5:3	4	3	0	1	6:3
Jezero	3	0	1	2	1:3	1	0	1	0	0:0	2	0	0	2	1:3
Kom	9	5	3	1	11:3	5	4	1	0	6:1	4	1	2	1	5:2
Mladost	24	8	7	9	29:28	9	2	3	4	8:10	14	6	4	5	21:18
Mogren	24	9	4	11	21:28	11	4	2	5	8:10	13	5	2	6	13:18
Mornar	18	11	3	4	29:15	8	5	1	2	15:8	10	6	2	2	14:7
OFK Petrovac	30	9	7	14	29:30	18	8	4	6	20:16	12	1	3	8	9:15
Rudar	30	10	8	12	24:36	16	5	4	7	12:20	13	5	4	5	12:16
Sutjeska	30	7	9	14	25:40	14	5	4	5	17:16	16	2	5	9	8:24
Zeta	30	9	4	17	33:41	14	7	3	5	21:16	15	2	1	11	12:25
Overall	330	117	80	133	337:362	165	73	43	49	193:151	165	44	37	84	144:211

=== Attendance ===
Below is the list of attendance at FK Lovćen First League home games by every single season.

Season	League	Average	Total	Games	Highest	Lowest
2007/08	Montenegrin First League	806	12,900	16	2,000 (vs. Budućnost)	300 (vs. Dečić)
2008/09	Montenegrin First League	636	10,800	17	1,500 (vs. Budućnost)	200 (vs. Jedinstvo)
2009/10	Montenegrin First League	638	10,200	16	1,500 (vs. Budućnost, Rudar)	100 (vs. Kom)
2010/11	Montenegrin First League	538	8,600	16	1,000 (vs. Budućnost, Mogren)	200 (vs. OFK Bar)
2011/12	Montenegrin First League	506	8,100	16	1,000 (vs. Budućnost)	300 (vs. Berane)
2012/13	Montenegrin First League	457	7,300	16	1,000 (vs. Mogren)	200 (vs. Mornar)
2013/14	Montenegrin First League	812	13,800	17	2,000 (vs. Budućnost)	300 (vs. Mladost, Mornar)
2014/15	Montenegrin First League	600	10,200	17	1,200 (vs. Budućnost)	200 (vs. Mornar)
2015/16	Montenegrin First League	550	8,800	16	1,000 (vs. Budućnost)	200 (vs. Petrovac)
2016/17	Montenegrin First League	588	9,400	16	1,200 (vs. Sutjeska)	200 (vs. Dečić)

== Managers ==
Since their promotion to the First League, Lovćen was led by 10 different coaches.

Manager	Period		Record					League				Cup				Europe				Other
Manager	from	until	Mtc	W	D	L	GD	W	D	L	GD	W	D	L	GD	W	D	L	GD	Note
(Montenegro) Nikola Rakojević	07/2007	06/2008	36	12	11	13	31:33	11	10	12	28:30	1	1	1	3:3	0	0	0	0:0	
(Serbia) Slobodan Dogandžić	07/2008	09/2008	6	0	4	2	2:4	0	4	2	2:4	0	0	0	0:0	0	0	0	0:0	
(Montenegro) Miodrag Radanović	10/2008	12/2008	16	7	4	5	15:10	5	2	4	10:7	2	2	1	5:3	0	0	0	0:0	
(Montenegro) Milorad Malovrazić	01/2009	06/2009	19	6	5	8	15:16	5	4	7	13:14	1	1	1	2:2	0	0	0	0:0	Cup finalists
(Montenegro) Branislav Milačić	07/2009	12/2010	53	19	12	22	31:39	19	12	19	46:56	0	0	3	0:6	0	0	0	0:0	
(Montenegro) Marko Marković	01/2011	09/2011	25	6	8	11	34:34	5	8	11	19:29	1	0	0	3:1	0	0	0	0:0	
(Montenegro) Predrag Vukotić	10/2011	12/2011	11	1	3	7	31:37	1	3	5	6:17	0	0	2	0:4	0	0	0	0:0	
(Montenegro) Radovan Kavaja	01/2012	06/2012	16	9	4	3	25:13	9	4	3	25:13	0	0	0	0:0	0	0	0	0:0	
(Serbia) Slobodan Halilović	07/2012	12/2012	22	4	4	14	22:40	2	2	13	13:36	2	2	1	9:4	0	0	0	0:0	
(Montenegro) Mojaš Radonjić	01/2013	11/2014	77	38	15	24	112:67	32	11	20	94:60	6	3	3	18:6	0	1	1	0:1	Cup winners
(Montenegro) Đuro Mijušković	11/2014	01/2015	4	2	1	1	8:6	2	0	1	7:5	0	1	0	1:1	0	0	0	0:0	
(Montenegro) Radovan Kavaja	01/2015	07/2015	16	7	4	5	18:13	7	4	5	18:13	0	0	0	0:0	0	0	0	0:0	
(Serbia) Slobodan Halilović	07/2015	10/2015	15	4	3	8	21:23	2	3	7	14:19	2	0	1	7:4	0	0	0	0:0	
(Montenegro) Dragan Đukanović	10/2015	04/2016	14	6	5	3	27:11	4	5	3	11:10	2	0	0	6:1	0	0	0	0:0	
(Montenegro) Milorad Malovrazić	04/2016	09/2016	17	3	3	11	9:23	3	2	10	8:20	0	1	1	1:3	0	0	0	0:0	
(North Macedonia) Dragan Kanatlarovski	09/2016		32	13	6	13	34:34	10	6	11	24:29	3	0	2	10:5	0	0	0	0:0	

== See also ==
- FK Lovćen
- FK Lovćen in European competitions
- Cetinje
