= Anđelko Jovanović =

Montenegrin footballer

Personal information
- Date of birth: 18 November 1999 (age 26)
- Place of birth: FR Yugoslavia
- Position: Midfielder

Team information
- Current team: Mladost DG
- Number: 10

Senior career*
Years	Team	Apps	(Gls)
2016–2018	Dečić	9	(1)
2018–2022	Podgorica	95	(18)
2022–2023	Dečić	21	(1)
2022	→ Mornar Bar (loan)	13	(1)
2023–2024	Podgorica	18	(3)
2024–	Mladost DG	73	(13)

International career^{‡}
2020–	Montenegro	1	(0)
- * Club domestic league appearances and goals as of 17 June 2026 ‡ National team caps and goals as of 20:31, 11 November 2020 (UTC)

Anđelko Jovanović (Serbian Cyrillic: Анђелко Јовановић; born 18 November 1999) is a Montenegrin footballer who plays as a midfielder for Mladost DG and the Montenegro national team.

== Career ==
Jovanović made his international debut for Montenegro on 11 November 2020 in a friendly match against Kazakhstan.

== Career statistics ==
=== International ===
As of 11 November 2020

Montenegro
Year	Apps	Goals
2020	1	0
Total	1	0
