= Savo Gazivoda =

Montenegrin footballer

Personal information
- Date of birth: 22 July 1994 (age 32)
- Place of birth: Podgorica, FR Yugoslavia
- Height: 1.80 m (5 ft 11 in)
- Position: Midfielder

Team information
- Current team: Podgorica
- Number: 10

Youth career
- Drezga
- Budućnost Podgorica

Senior career*
Years	Team	Apps	(Gls)
2009–2015	Budućnost Podgorica	13	(1)
2012	→ Dečić (loan)	6	(1)
2012–2013	→ Petrovac (loan)	4	(1)
2013	→ Mogren (loan)	0	(0)
2014	→ Rudar Pljevlja (loan)	1	(0)
2016	ČSK Čelarevo	6	(0)
2016	Spartak Subotica	0	(0)
2016	→ Extremadura (loan)	1	(0)
2017	Radnik Surdulica	7	(0)
2017	Radnički Niš	0	(0)
2017–2018	Iskra Danilovgrad	19	(0)
2018–2019	Bokelj	8	(3)
2019–2020	Kom	5	(0)
2020–2021	Rad	11	(0)
2021	Mornar	4	(0)
2022	Petrovac	11	(0)
2022–2023	FK Iskra	14	(1)
2023	Mornar	12	(0)
2024–2025	Podgorica	27	(6)
2025	Lovćen	7	(0)
2026–	Podgorica	16	(5)

International career^{‡}
2010	Montenegro U17	3	(0)
- * Club domestic league appearances and goals as of 8 April 2025 ‡ National team caps and goals as of 12 January 2017

Savo Gazivoda (Serbian Cyrillic: Саво Газивода; born 22 July 1994) is a Montenegrin footballer who plays as a midfielder for Podgorica.

== Club career ==
Born in Podgorica, Gazivoda started playing football with FK Drezga, and later moved to Budućnost Podgorica. He made his senior debut for Budućnost in the last fixture match of the 2010–11 Montenegrin First League season, against Sutjeska Nikšić at the age of 16. Gazivoda was also loaned to Dečić and OFK Petrovac between 2012 and 2013 before he joined Mogren in summer 2013. After he did not make any appearance for the club during the first half-season, he moved to Rudar Pljevlja where he played until the end of 2013–14 season. In summer 2014, Gazivoda returned to Budućnost Podgorica. He scored his first goal for Budućnost in the first game he played in the 2014–15 Montenegrin First League season, when he was substituted in during the 9th fixture match and later pointed for 1–0 victory against Berane. For his second spell with Budućnost, Gazivoda made 15 appearances with 1 goal in all competitions between 2014 and 2015. For the spring half of the 2015–16 season, Gazivoda joined the Serbian First League side ČSK Čelarevo, where he made 6 appearances. In summer 2016 he signed a three-year professional contract with Spartak Subotica, but shortly after moved on one-year loan to Extremadura UD. After breaking the contract with Spartak, Gazivoda joined Radnik Surdulica at the beginning of 2017, signing a two-and-a-half-year deal with new club. In summer 2017, Gazivoda moved to Radnički Niš.

In February 2019, Gazivoda joined FK Kom.
