= Blažo Perutović =

Montenegrin footballer

Personal information
- Full name: Blažo Perutović
- Date of birth: 8 December 1983 (age 42)
- Place of birth: Cetinje, SFR Yugoslavia
- Height: 1.85 m (6 ft 1 in)
- Position: Striker

Youth career
- 1989–1999: Lovćen
- 1999–2001: Sutjeska Nikšić

Senior career*
Years	Team	Apps	(Gls)
2001–2002	Sutjeska	3	(0)
2002–2003	OFK Beograd	0	(0)
2003–2005	Mogren		
2005–2008	Lovćen		
2008–2009	Domžale	16	(1)
2009–2010	Lovćen	23	(5)
2010–2011	Budućnost Podgorica	14	(2)
2012	Lovćen	22	(4)
2013	Petrovac	9	(0)
2013–2016	Lovćen	56	(11)
2016–2018	Iskra Danilovgrad	41	(3)
- * Club domestic league appearances and goals

Blažo Perutović (Cyrillic: Блажо Перутовић, born 8 December 1983) is a Montenegrin retired football striker.

== Club career ==
He played with FK Sutjeska Nikšić, OFK Beograd, FK Mogren, FK Budućnost Podgorica, NK Domžale, OFK Petrovac and FK Lovćen.

== Honours ==
Lovćen

- Montenegrin Cup: 2014
