= Donja Gorica, Podgorica =

Suburb of Podgorica, Montenegro

Donja Gorica
- Interactive map of Donja Gorica
- Coordinates: 42°25′22″N 19°12′59″E
- Time zone: UTC+1

Donja Gorica (Montenegrin: Доња Горица) is a suburb of Podgorica, Montenegro.
