= Šaleta Kordić =

Montenegrin footballer

Personal information
- Date of birth: 19 April 1993 (age 33)
- Place of birth: Kotor, FR Yugoslavia
- Height: 1.90 m (6 ft 3 in)
- Position: Striker

Team information
- Current team: Bokelj
- Number: 9

Youth career
- 2009–2010: Grbalj
- 2010–2011: Vojvodina

Senior career*
Years	Team	Apps	(Gls)
2012–2013	Vojvodina	4	(0)
2012	→ Mladost Podgorica (loan)	5	(0)
2013	→ RFK Novi Sad (loan)	8	(2)
2013	Grbalj	2	(0)
2014	Euromilk Gorno Lisiče	5	(1)
2014–2015	BSK Borča	25	(7)
2015	Vojvodina	1	(0)
2015–2016	Sutjeska Nikšić	30	(11)
2016	Vojvodina	0	(0)
2016–2017	Zeta	15	(3)
2017–2018	Grbalj	29	(5)
2018–2019	Sutjeska Nikšić	16	(3)
2019–2021	Podgorica	51	(16)
2022	Akzhayik	2	(0)
2022	Leotar	4	(0)
2022–2023	Železničar Pančevo	28	(9)
2023	Aiolikos	8	(1)
2024–2025	Arsenal Tivat	43	(6)
2025–	Bokelj	19	(2)

International career
2009–2012	Montenegro U17		
2012–2013	Montenegro U19		
2020	Montenegro	1	(0)
- * Club domestic league appearances and goals as of 25 May 2026

Šaleta Kordić (Serbian Cyrillic: Шалета Кордић; born 19 April 1993) is a Montenegrin professional footballer who plays as a striker for Montenegrin First League club Bokelj.

== Club career ==
Born in Kotor, he played with the youth team of Grbalj where he played during the 2009-10 Montenegrin youth championship. After that season Vojvodina brought Šaleta to its youth team along with his brother Marko. During the winter break of the season 2011-12 he was promoted to the first team. In summer 2012 he was loaned to Montenegrin First League side Mladost Podgorica.

After playing half a season in the First Macedonian Football League with Euromilk Gorno Lisiče, in summer 2014 he returned to Serbia this time to play with second tier side BSK Borča. On 5 June 2015, he returned to Vojvodina, signing a 3-year deal with the club. However, only few weeks later Šaleta terminated his contract with Vojvodina, and signed for Sutjeska Nikšić. After only one season, Kordić started his third spell at Vojvodina, signing a 2 1/2-year deal. However, only two months later, the contract was mutually terminated, and Kordić signed a one-year deal with Montenegrin side Zeta.

In June 2021, he signed with Russian club Chayka Peschanokopskoye. On 2 July 2021, Russian Football Union decided to relegate Chayka from second-tier FNL back to the third-tier PFL for the 2021–22 season for fixing games in the 2018–19 season. As foreign players are not allowed to play in the PFL, that meant a release from his contract with Chayka.

== International career ==
Šaleta Kordić has been part of the U-17 and U-19 Montenegrin national teams.

In May 2016 he was part of Montenegro "B" team.

He made his national team debut on 7 October 2020 in a friendly against Latvia.
