= Dejan Zarubica =

Montenegrin football forward (born 1993)

Personal information
- Date of birth: 11 April 1993 (age 33)
- Place of birth: Nikšić, FR Yugoslavia
- Height: 1.81 m (5 ft 11 1/2 in)
- Position: Forward

Youth career
- Sutjeska Nikšić
- Red Star Belgrade

Senior career*
Years	Team	Apps	(Gls)
2012–2013	Sutjeska Nikšić	3	(0)
2014–2015	OFK Beograd	12	(3)
2015–2018	Sutjeska Nikšić	64	(20)
2018	Iskra Danilovgrad	17	(1)
2018–2019	Lovćen	19	(1)
2019–2021	Buducnost Podgorica	56	(14)
2021–2022	Laci	20	(8)
2022	Ballkani	3	(0)

International career
2011–2012	Montenegro U-19	5	(0)
- * Club domestic league appearances and goals as of 11 December 2022

Dejan Zarubica (Serbian Cyrillic: Дејан Зарубица; born 11 April 1993) is a Montenegrin football forward.

== Club career ==
Born in Nikšić, he played in FK Sutjeska Nikšić in the 2012–13 season when they became champions of the Montenegrin First League. In January 2014 he signed with Serbian SuperLiga side OFK Beograd. In summer 2015, Zarubica returned to his hometown club Sutjeska Nikšić.

== International career ==
In May 2016 he was part of Montenegro "B" team.

== Honours ==
Sutjeska Nikšić

- Montenegrin First League: 2012–13

Buducnost Podgorica

- Montenegrin First League: 2020–21
