= Stadion Olympic =

Multi-use stadium in Ulcinj, Montenegro

Coordinates: 41°54′45″N 19°14′38″E

Stadion Olympic Stadion Olimpik Stadioni Olimpik
- Interactive map of Stadion Olympic; Stadion Olimpik; Stadioni Olimpik
- Location: Ulcinj, Montenegro
- Owner: Ulcinj Municipality
- Capacity: 715
- Surface: Grass

Tenant
- FK Otrant

Stadion Olympic (Montenegrin:Stadion Olimpik, Albanian:Stadioni Olimpik) is a multi-use stadium in Ulcinj, Montenegro. Mostly used for football matches, it has a capacity of 715 seats.

== History ==
Stadium is built in the 1970s by hotels company Velika Plaža, who is still owner of the pitch.
Stadium is built by the Adriatic Sea, on the longest sandy beach in the Montenegro - Velika Plaža. It is used mostly for football matches and hosts the home games of FK Otrant. The capacity of the stadium is 1,500 seats.
During the winter months, because of good climate and accommodation in Ulcinj, stadium is used for exhibition matches, tournaments, trainings and preparations of many football teams from the region (Montenegro, Serbia, Albania, Kosovo, Bosnia and Herzegovina and Croatia). Except Olympic, there are three another football grounds at Velika plaža sports center.

== Pitch ==
The pitch measures 105 x 70 meters. Between stands and pitch, there is an athletic track.

== See also ==
- FK Otrant
- Velika Plaža
- Ulcinj
