= OFK Mladost Donja Gorica =

Montenegrin football club

Mladost DG
- Full name: Omladinski fudbalski klub Mladost Donja Gorica
- Ground: DG Arena; Podgorica, Montenegro
- Capacity: 4,300
- Manager: Slavoljub Bubanja
- League: Montenegrin First League
- 2025–26: 6th
Home colours	Away colours

Omladinski fudbalski klub Mladost DG, known as Mladost Lob Bet for sponsorship reasons, is a professional football club from the southwestern part of Podgorica, Montenegro. Founded in 2019, they currently compete in Montenegrin First League.

== History ==
OFK Mladost DG is founded in 2019, as a team from Donja Gorica neighbourhood. From the beginning until 2022, the club operated under an affiliate partnership with FK Podgorica, whose young players were members of OFK Mladost DG.
The club made significant results during their first performance in official competitions. In the summer of 2019, OFK Mladost DG won the Central Region Cup and played in the first leg of Montenegrin Cup 2019-20, but they were defeated by FK Drezga (2-4). At the same time, the team started to play in Montenegrin Third League. In their very first season, OFK Mladost DG won the trophy of Third League - Center champion, but failed to get promotion to second-tier, after the playoffs against FK Igalo and FK Berane.
Next season, OFK Mladost DG won the Central Region champions' title again and this time succeeded to gain promotion via playoffs, with two victories against FK Petnjica (2-0) and FK Cetinje (6-0). With that success, in the summer of 2021, the team from Donja Gorica became a member of the Montenegrin Second League.

=== First League Record ===
For the first time, Mladost played in the Montenegrin First League in the 2023–24 season. Below is a list of Mladost scores in the First League by every single season.

Season	Pos	G	W	D	L	GF	GA
2023–24	9	36	9	7	20	37	59

== Honours ==
- Montenegrin Second League – 1
  - Winners (1): 2024–25
- Montenegrin Third League – Center – 1
  - Winners (2): 2019–20, 2020–21
- Central Region Cup – 1
  - Winners (1): 2019–20

== Current squad ==
As of 15 February 2026

Note: Flags indicate national team as defined under FIFA eligibility rules; some limited exceptions apply. Players may hold more than one non-FIFA nationality.

No.	Pos.	Nation	Player
3	DF	MNE	Matije Badnjar
4	DF	MNE	Luka Uskoković
5	DF	MNE	Jovan Vujisić
6	DF	MNE	Zvonko Ceklić
7	FW	MNE	Lazar Knežević
8	MF	MNE	Davor Kontić
9	FW	ARG	Rodrigo Faust
10	MF	MNE	Anđelko Jovanović
11	FW	MNE	Nikola Pavličević (on loan from Podgorica)
16	MF	MNE	Nikola Radusinović
17	FW	MNE	Nemanja Pavičević
18	DF	MNE	Vuko Vicković
25	GK	MNE	Petar Radulović

No.	Pos.	Nation	Player
27	FW	BRA	Stephano Almeida
28	MF	ARG	Nelson Augustin Cordoba
29	FW	MNE	Jagos Roganović
31	GK	MNE	Balsa Radanović
32	MF	MNE	Andrej Bozović
34	MF	ARG	Gustavo López
37	DF	MNE	Ljubomir Pejović
44	DF	MNE	Matija Vukčević
66	FW	MNE	Stefan Mijović
77	MF	MNE	Dušan Vuković
78	MF	SEN	Mamadou Camara (on loan from Sutjeska)
99	GK	MNE	Ognjen Milović

=== Out on loan ===
Note: Flags indicate national team as defined under FIFA eligibility rules; some limited exceptions apply. Players may hold more than one non-FIFA nationality.

No.	Pos.	Nation	Player

== Stadium ==
OFK Mladost DG is playing their home games on DG Arena, whose capacity is 4,000 seats. With modern facilities as additional grounds and other, it meets the criteria for First League and UEFA matches.

== See also ==
- DG Arena
- FK Podgorica
- Montenegrin Second League
- Football in Montenegro
