= DG Arena =

Stadium in Podgorica, Montenegro

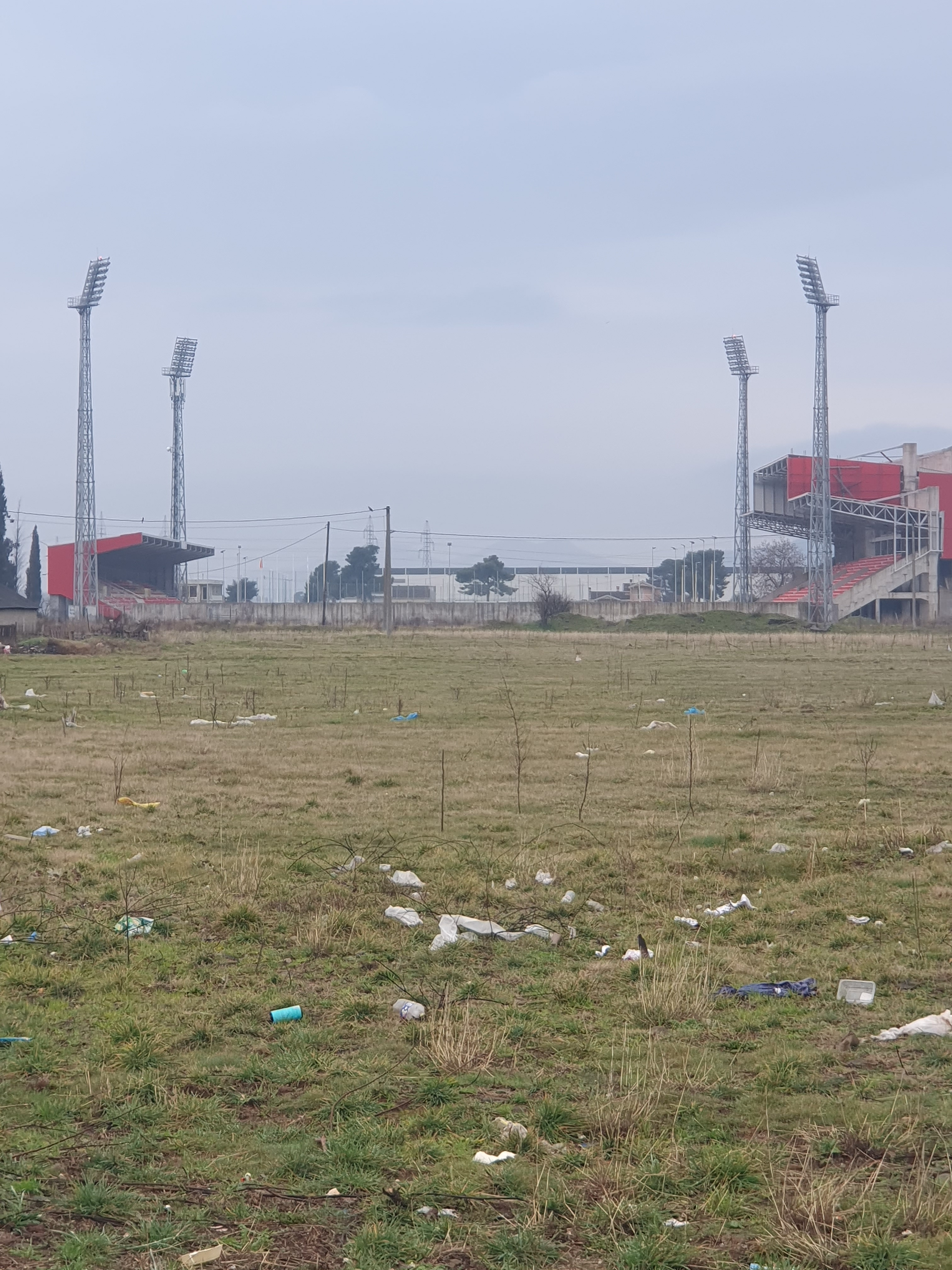
- Interactive map of DG Arena
- Full name: DG Arena
- Former names: Stari Ribnjak Stadium
- Location: Podgorica, Montenegro
- Coordinates: 42°24′42.3″N 19°13′02.5″E
- Owner: City of Podgorica
- Capacity: 3,791
- Surface: Grass
- Field size: 105 x 65 m

Construction
- Built: 1970
- Renovated: 2018

Tenants
- FK Podgorica, OFK Mladost DG

DG Arena (previously: Stari Ribnjak Stadium) is a football stadium in Donja Gorica suburb, Podgorica, Montenegro. It is situated on the Morača riverbank. It is used for football matches and is the home ground of FK Podgorica and OFK Mladost DG.

== History ==
Stari Ribnjak Stadium was built in 1970, when the old club OFK Mladost Lješkopolje was founded. During 2015 started the project of stadium renovation and building sports' complex on the same place. The first stadium, with artificial turf, floodlights and capacity of 1,000 seats was opened on 21 May 2016.
Two years after that, DG Arena was built. With 4,300 seats, facilities as additional ground and others, it meets the criteria for First League matches. The name of the stadium is an acronym - DG are the initials of the Donja Gorica suburb.
Today, FK Podgorica is playing their Montenegrin First League matches on DG Arena, while another permanent user of the stadium is a lower-ranks member OFK Mladost DG.

== Pitch and conditions ==
The pitch measures 105 x 65 meters.
The stadium have two stands with overall capacity of 4,000 seats. Except that, there will be three additional fields - one with artificial turf, which already exists, and two with natural grass.

== See also ==
- FK Podgorica
- OFK Mladost Donja Gorica
- Podgorica
