= Gradski stadion (Pljevlja) =

Multi-use stadium in Pljevlja, Montenegro

Coordinates: 43.362349°N 19.362245°E

Gradski Stadion
- Stadion pod Golubinjom
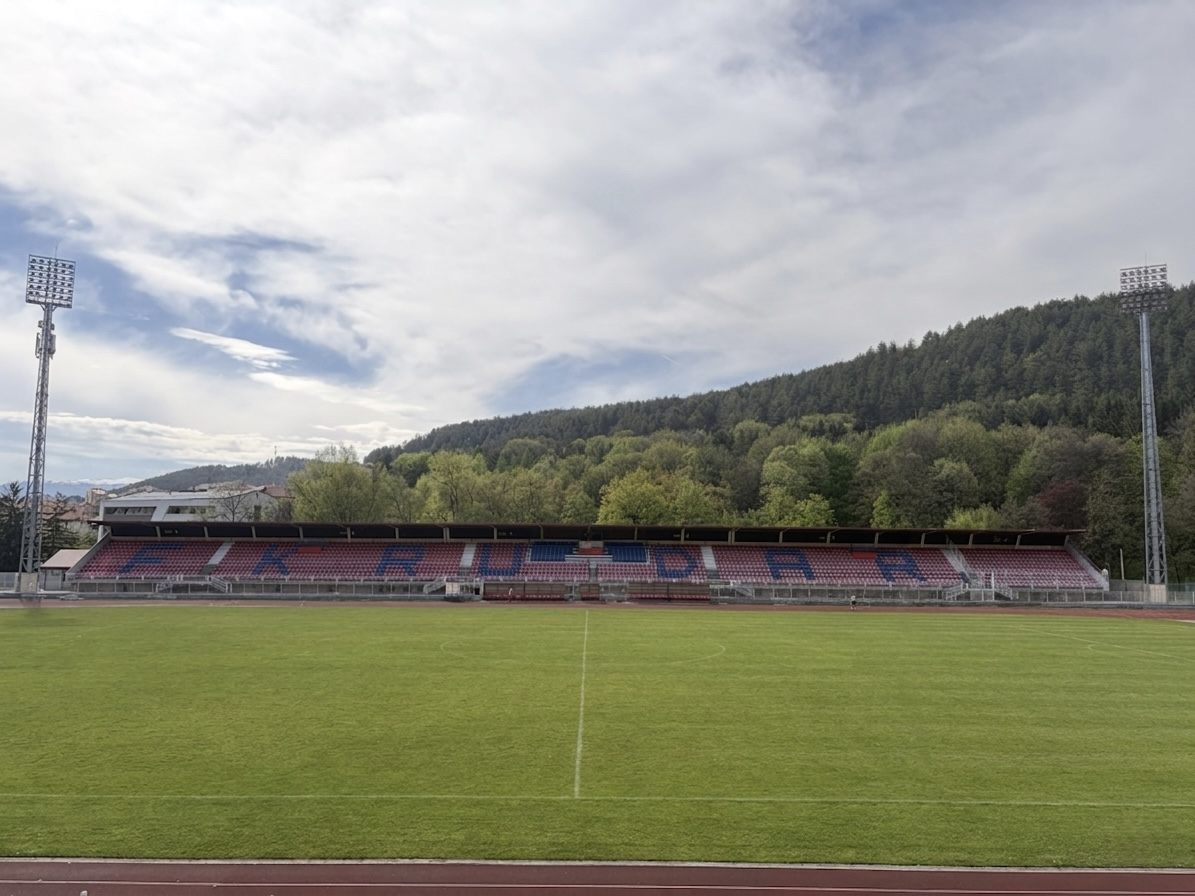
- Interactive map of Gradski Stadion
- Location: Park Vodice 84210 Pljevlja, Montenegro
- Owner: Pljevlja Municipality
- Capacity: 5,140
- Surface: Grass
- Field size: 105 m × 68 m (344 ft × 223 ft)

Construction
- Groundbreaking: 1946
- Opened: 1948
- Renovated: 1985

Tenants
- Rudar; Pljevlja

Stadion pod Golubinjom is a multi-use stadium in Pljevlja, Montenegro. It is used mostly for football matches and is the home ground of FK Rudar Pljevlja. Also, local clubs FK Pljevlja and women football club Breznica use this stadium. The stadium holds 5,140 seating places. On the east stands FK Rudar is written, and on the west stands Pljevlja, by red and blue chairs, which are the colors of the club. The stadium was built in 1972. In May of 2020, floodlight was added to the stadium, which was financed by the Football Association of Montenegro.
