= FK Otrant-Olympic =

Montenegrin association football club

Otrant-Olympic
- Full name: Fudbalski klub Otrant-Olympic; Klubi Futbollistik Otrant-Olympic
- Founded: 1921; 105 years ago
- Ground: Stadion Olympic; Ulcinj, Montenegro
- Capacity: 1,500
- Chairman: Skender Rexha
- Manager: Milija Savović
- League: Montenegrin First League
- 2025–26: Montenegrin Second League, 1st of 10 (promoted)
Home colours	Away colours

FK Otrant-Olympic (Montenegrin: Fudbalski klub Otrant-Olympic, Albanian: Klubi Futbollistik Otrant-Olympic) is a Montenegrin football club based in the coastal town of Ulcinj. They compete in the Montenegrin first league

== History ==
FK Otrant-Olympic is the first football club in Ulcinj, it was founded in 1921, under the name Olcinium. From 1921 to 1941, the team played only non-official games.
After World War II, i.e. during SFR Yugoslavia era, the club played under the name Bjelogorac. From the 1970s, they played in the Fourth League - South (lowest rank). In 1977–78, under the name Ulcinj, the club achieved its highest success to date, finishing as runner-up in the Fourth League. That meant promotion to the Montenegrin Republic League.
In 1983, the club was named Otrant, and after a few successful seasons, at the beginning of the 1990s, the club dissolved for one season. A new beginning came in the middle of the decade, and, until 2006, FK Otrant played in the Republic League, with frequent relegation.

Otrant achieved their greatest results in club history after Montenegrin independence. Within two seasons, they had won the Champions' title in Montenegrin Third League and since 2007, they played five seasons in the Montenegrin Second League. FK Otrant maintains the record of the highest win in the history of the Second League, winning 12–2 against Ribnica, on 20 May 2009.
In 2013, Otrant was dismantled because of worsening finances. Ulcinj was represented in 2013–14 season of the Montenegrin Third League as Federal, a youth football club founded in 2010. On 22 July 2015, the club was renamed to Otrant-Olympic. The team soon made a comeback to the Montenegrin Second League, with notable results in 2016-17. FK Otrant finished in third place and the team participated in the First League playoffs, but lost against FK Rudar (1–0; 0–3).
Next two seasons, FK Otrant finished at the upper part of Second League's table, but without another battle for promotion in the playoffs. Bad days came on season 2019-20, as FK Otrant finished at the bottom of the table. With that result, team from Ulcinj was relegated, after four consecutive seasons spent in second-tier.

== Seasons ==
Season	League	Position	Notes
FR Yugoslavia
2001–02	Montenegrin Regional League – Southern Region (IV level)	1	
2002–03	Montenegrin Republic League (III)	12	
Serbia and Montenegro
2003–04	Montenegrin Regional League – Southern Region (IV level)	?	
2004–05	Montenegrin Third League – Southern Region (IV)	?	
2005–06	Montenegrin Third League – Southern Region (IV)	1	
Montenegro
2006–07	Montenegrin Third League – Southern Region (III)	1	
2007–08	Montenegrin Second League (II)	10	
2008–09	Montenegrin Second League (II)	4	
2009–10	Montenegrin Second League (II)	10	
2010–11	Montenegrin Second League (II)	11	
2011–12	Montenegrin Third League – Southern Region (III)	?	
2012–13	Montenegrin Third League – Southern Region (III)	?	
2013–14	Did not participate		
2014–15	Did not participate		
2015–16	Montenegrin Third League – Southern Region (III)	1	
2016–17	Montenegrin Second League (II)	3	
2017–18	Montenegrin Second League (II)	5	
2018–19	Montenegrin Second League (II)	4	
2019–20	Montenegrin Second League (II)	10	
2020–21	Montenegrin Third League – Southern Region (III)	1	

== Honours and achievements ==
- Montenegrin Second League
  - Champions (1): 2025-26
  - Runners-up (1): 2023-24
- Montenegrin Third League
  - Champions (2): 2006–07, 2015–16, 2021–22
- Montenegrin Fourth League
  - Champions (5): 1989–90, 1991–92, 1996–97, 2001–02, 2005–06
- Southern Region Cup
  - Winners (1): 2006
- Independence Cup of Albania
  - Winners (1): 2015

== Players ==
=== Current squad ===
As of 7 September 2026 Note: Flags indicate national team as defined under FIFA eligibility rules; some limited exceptions apply. Players may hold more than one non-FIFA nationality.

No.	Pos.	Nation	Player
1	GK	MNE	Jasmin Agović
3	MF	MNE	Meris Pelinković
4	DF	MNE	Benjamin Rexhoviq
5	DF	MNE	Aleksandar Šofranac
6	MF	BRA	Caique Chagas
8	MF	MNE	Filip Pavićević
9	FW	MKD	Alban Taipi
10	FW	MNE	Halil Muharemovic
11	FW	MNE	Anđelo Rudović
12	GK	MNE	Donat Peraj
17	MF	MNE	Endrit Sefa
18	DF	MNE	Ermin Seratlić
19	MF	MNE	Lazar Lambulić

No.	Pos.	Nation	Player
20	FW	MNE	Danin Talović
22	FW	MNE	Matija Uskoković
24	MF	JPN	Dylan Nobiraki
27	DF	MNE	Petar Vuković
30	FW	MNE	Valentin Rudović
44	DF	MNE	Balša Banović
62	FW	MNE	Liburn Lazoja
87	MF	MNE	Arseld Hoxhaj
98	MF	MNE	Edin Đečbitrić
99	FW	BIH	Sadik Skrijelj
—	MF	MNE	Elvin Marseni
—	FW	MNE	Aleksandar Vujačić

== Stadium ==
FK Otrant plays its home games at Stadion Olympic, with a capacity of 1,500 seats. The stadium was built by the Adriatic Sea, on the longest sandy beach in Montenegro - Velika Plaža.

== See also ==
- Ulcinj
- Montenegrin Second League
- Montenegrin clubs in Yugoslav football competitions (1946–2006)
