= FK Podgorica =

Montenegrin association football club

- Full name: Fudbalski klub Podgorica
- Founded: 1970; 56 years ago
- Ground: DG Arena; Podgorica, Montenegro
- Capacity: 4,000
- Head coach: Vojislav Pejović
- League: Montenegrin Second League
- 2024–25: Montenegrin Second League, 7th of 9
Home colours	Away colours

Fudbalski klub Podgorica, formerly known as OFK Mladost 1970, is a professional football club from the southwestern part of Podgorica, Montenegro. It was founded in 1970, the club was reactivated during 2014. In the summer 2019, the club was renamed to FK Podgorica.

== History ==
=== Period 1970–1980 ===
Founded in 1970 as OFK Mladost, they were one of the numerous clubs from Podgorica which participated in the lowest competitive level in Montenegro at that time. The club played in the Fourth League – Central region. OFK Mladost represented players from Podgorica region Lješkopolje (suburbs Donja Gorica, Gonja Gorica, Donji Kokoti, Farmaci, Grbavci, Beri etc.). At that time, there was another one club from Lješkopolje region – Napredak from Donji Kokoti.
The first big success OFK Mladost made during the 1972–73 season was winning the title in the Fourth league. That gained them promotion to the Montenegrin Republic League, a third-tier competition in SFR Yugoslavia football system.
OFK Mladost played two seasons in the Republic competition. During the 1973–74 season, OFK Mladost finished in 11th place among 16 clubs. Next season, they finished in last place. OFK Mladost were relegated to the Fourth league.
At the end of the seventies, the club was dissolved.
The club's score in the Montenegrin Republic League seasons:

Season	Place	M	W	D	L	GD	PTS
1973/74	11	30	11	4	15	44:66	26
1974/75	16	30	3	3	24	22:94	9

=== Period 2014–present ===
In 2014, FK Podgorica was reactivated under the name OFK Mladost 1970. The club started with players' selection and trainings. During 2015, the club's management made the decision to apply for the 2015-16 Third League season. They played their first official matches in the Central Region Cup and soon after that they started playing in the Third League. After two wins, Podgorica went to the final of the Central Region Cup 2015, which meant qualifying for the 2015-16 Montenegrin Cup. In the first leg of the national Cup, Podgorica won against FK Sloga Bar away (1:0), but in the round of 16, First league member FK Lovćen eliminated them (3:0, 2:3). Podgorica finished their inaugural season in the Third League (2015–16) fifth in the table.
Next year (2016), Podgorica won the Central Region Cup, defeating FK Gorštak in the final. That gained them participation in the 2016–17 Montenegrin Cup. In the first round, Podgorica surprisingly eliminated Second League side FK Cetinje, but in the Round of 16 were eliminated by top-flight member FK Iskra.
In the 2016–17 season, Podgorica won the title in the Third League, with 19 wins and one draw in 20 matches. Furthermore, their 14–0 victory against Crvena Stijena is the biggest in the history of Third League – Center. With that result, the team gained significant success – promotion to the 2017-18 Montenegrin Second League.
On their debut in the Second league, Podgorica had an impressive season. The team finished in second place, with seven points less than title winners FK Mornar. Besides, their attacker Elie Matuoke was the top scorer of Second League, with 23 goals. With that success, Podgorica participated in the Montenegrin First League playoffs, but could not achieve promotion. Their opponent was OFK Petrovac, who won the first game at DG Arena (3–0), while the second game finished with a draw (2–2).
In the 2018–19 season, Podgorica won the title. It was their first ever promotion to the top-flight, which was secured four weeks before the end of the season. Except that, Podgorica made another success in the Montenegrin Cup. After eliminating Otrant (1-0) and Kom (1-0, 3–0), they reached the quarterfinals and their rival was a well-known national side Budućnost. In the first game at Podgorica City Stadium, Podgorica made a big sensation (1–1), but they were eliminated in the second leg after losing 0–1.
Under the new name, Podgorica debuted in the top-flight in the 2019–20 season. They played their first game in Prva CFL against Petrovac away and drew 1–1. At the same time, they made a new club – OFK Mladost DG - as an affiliate partner, which aims to produce young talents for the FK Podgorica first team. On their debut in the top-tier, Podgorica battled for European competition - both in the League and in the Cup, where they progressed to semifinals. But due to the COVID-19 pandemic, Montenegrin First League 2019-20 was interrupted after the 31st week and fifth-placed Podgorica failed to qualify for the UEFA Europa League.
Next season, Podgorica begun with seven consecutive games without single defeat, and among them was victory against title-holder Budućnost (4–0). So, after the first quarter of season, Podgorica was the leader on the table. After that, Podgorica's form worsened, but they remained in the top-four in Prva CFL. With that result, team from DG Arena qualified for their first-ever appearance in European competitions – 2021–22 UEFA Europa Conference League.

==== Season to season ====
The club's score after reactivation:

Season	League	Place	M	W	D	L	GD	PTS	Cup
2015/16	3. CFL	5	24	10	2	12	32:36	28	1/8 finals
2016/17	3. CFL	1	20	19	1	0	91:13	58	1/8 finals
2017/18	2. CFL	2	33	18	7	8	59:33	61	1/16 finals
2018/19	2. CFL	1	36	20	7	9	59:34	67	Quarterfinals
2019/20	1. CFL	5	31	8	16	7	34:27	40	Semifinals
2020/21	1. CFL	4	36	15	7	14	39:38	52	Quarterfinals
2021/22	1. CFL	9	36	8	10	18	38:61	34	Quarterfinals
2022/23	2. CFL	5	32	11	11	10	36:33	44	Quarterfinals

== Honours ==
- Montenegrin Second League – 1
  - Winners (1): 2018–19
  - Runners-up (1): 2017–18
- Montenegrin Third League – 1
  - Winners (1): 2016–17
- Montenegrin Fourth League – 1
  - Winners (1): 1972–73
- Central Region Cup – 1
  - Winners (1): 2016–17
  - Runners-up (1): 2015–16

== European record ==
Season	Competition	Round	Club	Home	Away	Agg.
2021-22	2021-22 UEFA Europa Conference League	1QR	(Albania) Laçi	1-0	0–3 (a.e.t.)	1–3

Notes

- QR: Qualifying round

== Players ==
=== Current squad ===
As of 25 May 2024

Note: Flags indicate national team as defined under FIFA eligibility rules; some limited exceptions apply. Players may hold more than one non-FIFA nationality.

No.	Pos.	Nation	Player
1	GK	MNE	Petar Bobičić
2	DF	MNE	Seid Adrović
3	DF	MNE	Danilo Bracanović
5	DF	MNE	Zarija Kumburović
6	DF	MNE	Marko Dragičević
7	MF	MNE	Petar Prelević
8	MF	SRB	Nenad Adžibaba
9	MF	MNE	Bojan Kopitović
10	MF	MNE	Nikola Pavlićević
11	FW	MNE	Marko Bojović
12	GK	MNE	Filip Babović
14	MF	MNE	Kristijan Radunović
15	DF	MNE	Rajko Popovic
16	MF	MNE	Matija Delić
17	DF	MNE	Miloš Vračar

No.	Pos.	Nation	Player
18	FW	FRA	Patrick Gbegbe
19	FW	MNE	Marko Vračar
20	MF	MNE	Pavle Ćetković
22	DF	MNE	Vojin Jeknić
26	FW	MNE	Luka Đuretić
29	MF	MNE	Danijel Bečić
30	MF	MNE	Savo Gazivoda
31	DF	MNE	Luka Bulatović
99	GK	MNE	Vuko Vujovic
—	DF	MNE	Vaso Bojanović
—	DF	MNE	Filip Uskoković
—	DF	MNE	Ilija Radunović
—	DF	MNE	Petar Burić
—	FW	MNE	Marko Popović

=== Notable players ===
Below is the list of former Bokelj players who represented their countries at the full international level.

- (Montenegro) Meldin Drešković
- (Montenegro) Anđelko Jovanović
- (Montenegro) Šaleta Kordić
- (Montenegro) Balša Sekulić
- (Montenegro) Nikola Vujnović
- (Montenegro) Marko Vukčević

For the list of former and current players with Wikipedia article, please see Category:FK Podgorica players.

== Stadium ==
In the 1970s, the club played in their own field at Donja Gorica, near the local pond. In their first season after the reactivation, FK Podgorica played their home matches in the neighbouring Donji Kokoti.

On 21 May 2016, a new stadium of FK Podgorica in Donja Gorica was opened. Two years after that, DG Arena was built. With 4,000 seats, facilities as additional ground and other, it meets the criteria for First League and UEFA matches. The name of the stadium is an acronym - DG are the initials of the Donja Gorica suburb.

== See also ==
- OFK Mladost Donja Gorica
- Montenegrin Second League
- Football in Montenegro
- Montenegrin clubs in Yugoslav football competitions (1946–2006)
