= List of FK Budućnost seasons =

This is a list of the seasons played by FK Budućnost from 1925, when the club is founded. The club's achievements in all major national competitions are listed.

== Overall ==
In period before Second World War, FK Budućnost played in Montenegrin Football Championship, winning it four times - Autumn 1932, Spring 1933, Autumn 1933, 1934. Budućnost was the fourth most-successful team in Montenegrin Championship 1922–1940.
The club from Podgorica played in Montenegrin Championship from season 1927 until 1935. At the beginning of 1937, as a team which supported workers' ideas, together with FK Lovćen, FK Budućnost was abandoned by regime of that time. During the next years, the club, under the temporary name RSK Crna Gora, played only few friendly, illegal games, against Lovćen and FK Velež.
After 1946, most of their seasons in domestic competition, FK Budućnost spent in First League (Yugoslav First League, First League of Serbia and Montenegro and Montenegrin First League. Also, the club played seasons in the Second League of SFR Yugoslavia and Serbia and Montenegro, and in the early days, three seasons in Montenegrin Republic League. From 1946, FK Budućnost won five national champions' titles - 2007-08, 2011–12, 2016–17, 2019–20, 2020-21.
Below is an overall score of all matches of FK Budućnost in official competitions since 1925.

Competition Level	Seasons	First season	Last season	Matches	W	D	L	GD
First League	52	1946-47	2020-21	1654	683	386	585	2120:2017
Second League	21	1947-48	2003-04	620	331	146	143	1021:532
Republic League	3	1946	1953	28	23	2	3	113:29
First League playoffs	10	1951-52	1996-97	28	10	6	12	37:44
Montenegrin Championship (1922–1940)	12	1927	1935	37	25	4	8	94:42
National Cup	59	1947	2020-21	192	104	34	54	309:205
UEFA competitions	15	1981-82	2019-20	46	16	11	19	59:59
Balkans Cup	2	1977	1990-91	10	2	6	2	9:8
OVERALL (1925–)				2605	1194	595	826	3762:2936

Note: Including 2019–20 UEFA Europa League, 2020–21 Montenegrin First League and 2020-21 Montenegrin Cup results

== Honours and achievements ==
National Championships – 5

- Montenegrin First League:
  - Winners (5): 2007–08, 2011–12, 2016–17, 2019–20, 2020–21
  - Runners-up (8): 2006–07, 2008–09, 2009–10, 2010–11, 2012–13, 2015–16, 2017–18, 2018–19

National Cups – 3

- Montenegrin Cup:
  - Winners (3): 2012–13, 2018–19, 2020–21
  - Runners-up (3): 2007–08, 2009–10, 2015–16
- Yugoslav Cup:
  - Runners-up (2): 1964–65, 1976–77

Other competitions – 21

- Montenegrin Championship (1922–1940)
  - Winners (4): 1932, spring 1933, autumn 1933, 1934
  - Runners-up (2): 1931, 1935
- Yugoslav Second League:
  - Winners (6): 1947–48, 1961–62, 1968–69, 1971–72, 1972–73, 1974–75
  - Runners-up (4): 1954–55, 1960–61, 1969–70, 1970–71
- SCG Second League:
  - Winners (1): 2003–04
  - Runners-up (1): 2001–02
- Montenegrin Republic League:
  - Winners (3): 1946, 1952, 1953
- Montenegrin Republic Cup:
  - Winners (7): 1949, 1955, 1955–56, 1956–57, 1966–67, 1967–68, 2003–04

International – 1

- Intertoto Cup
  - Group winners (1): 1981
- Balkans Cup:
  - Runners-up (1): 1990–91

== Records ==
=== All competition ===
- Biggest ever home victory: Budućnost - Rabotnički 10:0 (May 16, 1948, Yugoslav Second League)
- Biggest ever home defeat: Budućnost - Hajduk Split 0:5 (December 15, 1946, Yugoslav First League)
- Biggest ever away victory: Iskra Danilovgrad - Budućnost 1:13 (May 10, 1953, Montenegrin Republic League)
- Biggest ever away defeat: Partizan - Budućnost 10:0 (October 29, 1950, Yugoslav First League)
- Biggest ever home attendance: 20,000, Budućnost - Hajduk Split (August 27, 1975, Yugoslav First League)
- Lowest ever home attendance: 150, Budućnost - Pljevlja (October 01, 2014, Montenegrin Cup)
- Biggest ever away attendance: 60,000, Dinamo Zagreb - Budućnost (May 02, 1982, Yugoslav First League)
- Lowest ever away attendance: 100, Milicionar - Budućnost (December 05, 1998, FR Yugoslavia First League)

=== First League ===
- Biggest ever home league victory: Budućnost - Nafta 9:0 (March 16, 1947)
- Biggest ever home league defeat: Budućnost - Hajduk Split 0:5 (December 15, 1946)
- Biggest ever away league victory: Jedinstvo - Budućnost 0:5 (March 20, 2013)
- Biggest ever away league defeat: Partizan - Budućnost 10:0 (October 29, 1950)
- Biggest ever average attendance by season: 12,765 (1975/76)
- Lowest ever average attendance by season: 989 (1993/94)
- Longest unbeaten run: 24 match (September 27, 2020 - March 20, 2021)
- Longest unbeaten run in league: 23 match (September 12, 2020 - March 20, 2021)
- Longest winning streak: 10 matches (March 17, 2012 - May 09, 2012 and October 31, 2020 - December 17, 2020)
- Longest run without conceded goal: 9 matches (August 18, 2016 - October 07, 2016)
- Longest run without win: 13 matches (September 13, 1997 - February 21, 1998)
- Longest losing streak: 6 matches (October 07, 1990 - December 02, 1990), (August 18, 1995 - September 30, 1995)
- Longest run without scored goal: 5 matches (October 06, 1991 - November 17, 1991)
- Most points in a season: 85 (2020/21)
- Fewest points in a season: 10 (1949/50)
- Most wins in a season: 27 (2020/21)
- Fewest wins in a season: 3 (1949/50)
- Most losses in a season: 18 (1999/00, 2000/01)
- Fewest losses in a season: 1 (2006/07)
- Most scored goals in a season: 90 (2024/25)
- Fewest scored goals in a season: 15 (1949/50)
- Most conceded goals in a season: 59 (1993/94)
- Fewest conceded goals in a season: 12 (2006/07)
- Best Goal Differential: +61 (2024/25)
- Worst Goal Differential: -29 (1949/50)

=== UEFA competition ===
- Biggest victory: (Malta) Valletta - Budućnost 0:5 (June 18, 2005, Intertoto Cup)
- Biggest defeat: Budućnost – (Finland) HJK Helsinki 0:4 (July 13, 2021, UEFA Champions League), (Faroe Islands) HB – Budućnost 4:0 (July 22, 2021, UEFA Europa Conference League)
- Biggest ever home attendance: 10,000, Budućnost - (Spain) Deportivo La Coruña (July 09, 2005, Intertoto Cup), Budućnost - (Croatia) Hajduk (July 19, 2007, UEFA Cup)
- Lowest ever home attendance (in Podgorica): 2,000, Budućnost - (North Macedonia) Rabotnički (July 07, 2016, UEFA Europa League)
- Biggest ever away attendance: 30,000, (Croatia) Hajduk - Budućnost (August 02, 2007, UEFA Cup)
- Lowest ever away attendance: 300, (Estonia) Tervis Pärnu - Budućnost (June 25, 1995, Intertoto Cup)

=== Players and coaches ===
- Most performances: (Montenegro) Slavko Vlahović - 413/1 (1977-1991)
- Most performances in First League: (Montenegro) Slavko Vlahović - 392 (1977-1991)
- Top goalscorer: (Montenegro) Mojaš Radonjić - 84 (1972-1982)
- Top goalscorer in First League: (Montenegro) Mojaš Radonjić - 52 (1975-1982)
- Head coach with most seasons: (Montenegro) Vojin Božović - 10 (1946-1955)
- Head coach with most games: (Montenegro) Vojin Božović - 199 (1946-1955)

== Seasons in domestic competitions ==
=== Championship ===
==== Final placement by seasons ====
From 1927, FK Budućnost played 86 seasons in domestic leagues of SFR Yugoslavia, FR Yugoslavia, Kingdom of Yugoslavia, Serbia and Montenegro and Montenegro. FK Budućnost have five titles of national champion of Montenegro.
Below is a list of FK Budućnost final placements by every single season.

Season	League	Position	P	W	D	L	F	A	GD	Pts
1927	Montenegrin Football Championship	-	1	0	0	1	0	3	–3	0
1928	Montenegrin Football Championship	-	2	1	0	1	4	4	0	2
1929	Montenegrin Football Championship	-	2	1	0	1	3	5	–2	2
1930	Montenegrin Football Championship	-	1	0	0	1	0	1	–1	0
1931/I	Montenegrin Football Championship	3	3	2	0	1	10	6	+4	4
1931/II	Montenegrin Football Championship	2	3	2	0	1	10	5	+5	4
1932/I	Montenegrin Football Championship	-	1	0	0	1	1	2	–1	0
1932/II	Montenegrin Football Championship	1	4	4	0	0	18	5	+13	8
1933/I	Montenegrin Football Championship	1	5	4	1	0	15	3	+12	9
1933/II	Montenegrin Football Championship	1	6	5	1	0	11	1	+10	11
1934	Montenegrin Football Championship	1	8	6	2	0	22	5	+17	14
1935	Montenegrin Football Championship	2	1	0	0	1	1	2	–1	0
1946	Montenegrin Republic League	1	6	5	1	0	32	8	+24	11
1946/47	Yugoslav First League	10	26	7	6	13	44	54	–10	20
1947/48	Yugoslav Second League	1	20	13	3	4	46	21	+25	29
1948/49	Yugoslav First League	6	18	6	4	8	29	36	–7	16
1949/50	Yugoslav First League	10	18	3	4	11	15	44	–29	10
1950/51	Yugoslav Second League	3	30	18	4	8	58	30	+28	40
1951/52	Montenegrin Republic League	1	8	7	0	1	26	7	+19	14
1952/53	Montenegrin Republic League	1	14	11	1	2	55	14	+43	23
1953/54	Yugoslav Second League	5	18	8	4	6	23	27	–4	20
1954/55	Yugoslav Second League	2	18	12	2	4	41	20	+21	26
1955/56	Yugoslav First League	11	26	10	4	12	46	58	–12	24
1956/57	Yugoslav First League	9	26	9	5	12	38	47	–9	23
1957/58	Yugoslav First League	10	26	8	9	9	30	36	–6	25
1958/59	Yugoslav First League	9	22	7	5	10	25	41	–16	19
1959/60	Yugoslav First League	11	22	4	4	14	16	40	–24	22
1960/61	Yugoslav Second League	2	22	12	5	5	39	21	+18	29
1961/62	Yugoslav Second League	1	22	12	4	6	36	29	+7	28
1962/63	Yugoslav First League	14	26	5	8	13	19	38	–19	18
1963/64	Yugoslav Second League	7	30	12	7	11	46:35	31		
1964/65	Yugoslav Second League	3	30	16	7	7	47:27	39		
1965/66	Yugoslav Second League	9	34	13	8	13	45:37	34		
1966/67	Yugoslav Second League	10	34	13	8	13	43:30	34		
1967/68	Yugoslav Second League	4	34	16	6	12	49:36	38		
1968/69	Yugoslav Second League	1	30	18	9	3	48:15	45		
1969/70	Yugoslav Second League	2	30	19	8	3	61:15	46		
1970/71	Yugoslav Second League	2	30	15	8	7	48:20	38		
1971/72	Yugoslav Second League	1	34	19	7	8	45:26	45		
1972/73	Yugoslav Second League	1	34	16	16	2	56:20	48		
1973/74	Yugoslav Second League	6	34	12	10	12	35:25	34		
1974/75	Yugoslav Second League	1	34	23	7	4	58:23	53		
1975/76	Yugoslav First League	15	34	11	8	15	25:42	30		
1976/77	Yugoslav First League	9	34	11	11	12	44:47	33		
1977/78	Yugoslav First League	11	34	12	7	15	41:51	31		
1978/79	Yugoslav First League	6	34	15	8	11	33:36	38		
1979/80	Yugoslav First League	11	34	10	12	12	34:34	32		
1980/81	Yugoslav First League	6	34	11	12	11	38:34	34		
1981/82	Yugoslav First League	8	34	13	8	13	47:44	34		
1982/83	Yugoslav First League	14	34	11	9	14	39:52	31		
1983/84	Yugoslav First League	14	34	12	7	15	33:37	31		
1984/85	Yugoslav First League	15	34	11	8	15	31:49	30		
1985/86	Yugoslav First League	14	34	13	4	17	47:52	30		
1986/87	Yugoslav First League	7	34	14	9	11	40:36	37		
1987/88	Yugoslav First League	9	34	10	12	12	40:48	32		
1988/89	Yugoslav First League	14	34	12	7	15	32:43	31		
1989/90	Yugoslav First League	10	34	13	8	13	30:35	34		
1990/91	Yugoslav First League	17	36	13	6	17	43:48	32		
1991/92	Yugoslav First League	12	33	10	8	15	30:32	28		
1992/93	FR Yugoslavia First League	10	36	14	8	14	44:48	36		
1993/94	FR Yugoslavia First League	6	36	13	8	15	38:59	34		
1994/95	FR Yugoslavia First League	11	36	18	7	11	58:50	43		
1995/96	FR Yugoslavia First League	14	36	10	8	18	29:54	28		
1996/97	FR Yugoslavia First League	10	33	11	6	16	26:44	39		
1997/98	FR Yugoslavia First League	8	33	8	9	16	27:53	33		
1998/99	FR Yugoslavia First League	14	24	7	5	12	28:42	26		
1999/00	FR Yugoslavia First League	12	40	15	7	18	45:45	52		
2000/01	FR Yugoslavia First League	15	34	11	5	18	29:48	38		
2001/02	FR Yugoslavia Second League	2	33	20	9	4	54:17	69		
2002/03	FR Yugoslavia Second League	3	33	15	10	8	46:29	55		
2003/04	SCG Second League	1	36	29	4	3	97:29	91		
2004/05	SCG First League	6	30	12	5	13	37:37	41		
2005/06	SCG First League	14	30	6	10	14	24:43	28		
2006/07	Montenegrin First League	2	33	22	10	1	58:12	76		
2007/08	Montenegrin First League	1	33	18	12	3	43:13	66		
2008/09	Montenegrin First League	2	33	21	7	5	72:34	70		
2009/10	Montenegrin First League	2	33	21	6	6	67:35	69		
2010/11	Montenegrin First League	2	33	22	7	4	58:29	73		
2011/12	Montenegrin First League	1	33	25	5	3	82:27	80		
2012/13	Montenegrin First League	2	33	17	9	7	57:38	60		
2013/14	Montenegrin First League	4	33	16	6	11	36:26	54		
2014/15	Montenegrin First League	3	33	18	9	6	46:20	63		
2015/16	Montenegrin First League	2	33	19	6	8	48:21	63		
2016/17	Montenegrin First League	1	33	17	6	10	52:28	57		
2017/18	Montenegrin First League	2	36	14	15	7	44:30	57		
2018/19	Montenegrin First League	2	36	17	14	5	56:25	65		
2019/20	Montenegrin First League	1	31	23	4	4	63:26	73		
2020/21	Montenegrin First League	1	36	27	4	5	65:29	85		
2021/22	Montenegrin First League	2	36	20	7	9	78:45	67		
2022/23	Montenegrin First League	1	36	20	10	6	61:37	70		
2023/24	Montenegrin First League	3	36	17	10	9	66:43	61		
2024/25	Montenegrin First League	1	35	26	6	3	90:29	84		

==== Opponents in Montenegrin Championship (1925-1935) ====
FK Budućnost played in Montenegrin Football Championship from 1927 to 1935. During their first season, the club played still under the name RSK Zora. They didn't play in Championship from 1936, because the work of RSK Budućnost was banned by Yugoslav authorities, which recognized them as a team which supported workers' ideas. Since 1937, the team was renamed as RSK Crna Gora, but played only friendly games.

Season	Competition	Matches
1927	Montenegrin championship	Round one vs. GSK Balšić 0-3
1928	Montenegrin championship	Round one vs. GSK Balšić 2–1; Round two vs. FK Lovćen 2-3
1929	Montenegrin championship	Round one vs. GSK Balšić 3–2; Round two vs. SK Crnogorac 0-3
1930	Montenegrin championship	Round one vs. GSK Balšić 0-1
Spring 1931	Montenegrin championship	Round one vs. GSK Balšić 4–1; Round two vs. FK Berane 3–0; Semifinals vs. Obilić 3-5
Autumn 1931	Montenegrin championship	Round one vs. GSK Balšić 6–2; Round two vs. FK Gorštak 3–1; Finals vs. SK Crnogorac 1-2
Spring 1932	Montenegrin championship	Round one vs. GSK Balšić 1-2
Autumn 1932	Montenegrin championship	Round one vs. GSK Balšić 2–1; Round two vs. FK Sutjeska 2–1; Semifinals vs. FK Gorštak 8–0; Finals vs. FK Lovćen 6-3
Spring 1933	Montenegrin championship	Round one vs. GSK Balšić 1–0; Round two vs. FK Sutjeska 7–1; Semifinals vs. FK Berane 3–0; Finals vs. FK Lovćen 2-2; 2-0
Autumn 1933	Montenegrin championship	Round one vs. GSK Balšić 3–0; Round two vs. FK Gorštak ?-?; Semifinals vs. FK Iskra 3–0; 3–0; Finals vs. FK Lovćen 1–0; 1-1
1934	Montenegrin championship	Round one vs. FK Iskra 5–1; 1-1; Round two vs. FK Sutjeska 2–0; 4:-1; Semifinals vs. GSK Balšić 5–0; 2–1; Finals vs. FK Lovćen 2–0; 1-1
1935	Montenegrin championship	Finals vs. FK Lovćen 1–2

==== Opponents in the First League (1946-) ====
From their first appearance in Yugoslav First League until today, FK Budućnost played games against 73 different teams. In the table below are scores against all opponents, including home and away overall scores.

Overall								Home					Away				
Opponent	F	L	G	W	D	L	GD	G	W	D	L	GD	G	W	D	L	GD
OFK Bar	2010	2011	3	2	1	0	3:1	1	1	0	0	1:0	2	1	1	0	2:1
Bečej	1992	1997	11	4	2	5	9:13	5	3	2	0	7:3	6	1	0	5	2:10
OFK Beograd	1946	2006	52	17	14	21	61:75	26	14	9	3	38:20	26	3	5	18	23:55
Berane	2006	2015	12	12	0	0	28:4	7	7	0	0	19:2	5	5	0	0	9:2
Bokelj Kotor	2007	2017	15	8	5	2	21:12	7	3	4	0	13:7	8	5	1	2	8:5
Borac Banja Luka	1975	1993	20	9	6	5	21:20	10	8	2	0	14:2	10	1	4	5	7:18
Borac Čačak	1994	2006	13	4	2	7	16:18	6	3	2	1	11:5	8	1	0	6	5:13
Budućnost Banatski Dvor	2005	2006	2	0	0	2	1:4	1	0	0	1	0:2	1	0	0	1	1:2
Cibalia Vinkovci	1982	1987	10	5	3	2	16:9	5	4	1	0	12:3	5	1	2	2	4:6
Crvena Zvezda Beograd	1946	2006	76	14	16	46	68:159	37	11	11	15	40:50	39	3	5	31	28:109
Čelik Nikšić	2012	2014	6	2	2	2	5:4	3	2	1	0	4:1	3	0	1	2	1:3
Čelik Zenica	1975	1989	17	7	5	6	19:22	9	6	2	1	13:6	9	1	3	5	6:16
Čukarički	1996	2005	10	4	2	4	8:9	6	3	1	2	6:4	4	1	1	2	2:5
Dečić Tuzi	2006	2021	35	28	5	2	93:19	20	16	3	1	49:14	15	12	2	1	24:6
Dinamo Zagreb	1946	1991	50	12	12	26	45:87	25	11	9	5	34:25	25	1	3	21	11:62
Grbalj Radanovići	2006	2020	44	26	10	8	80:40	23	12	7	4	45:26	21	14	3	4	35:14
Hajduk Beograd	1999	2005	4	4	0	0	11:2	2	2	0	0	6:0	2	2	0	0	5:2
Hajduk Kula	1992	2006	23	7	6	10	14:20	11	4	5	2	8:5	12	3	1	8	6:15
Hajduk Split	1946	1991	50	15	9	26	50:86	25	12	6	7	30:26	25	3	4	18	20:60
Iskra Bugojno	1984	1985	2	1	0	1	3:4	1	1	0	0	2:1	1	0	0	1	1:3
Iskra Danilovgrad	2015	2021	21	14	4	3	31:11	9	8	0	1	13:2	12	6	4	2	18:9
Javor Ivanjica	2005	2006	2	1	1	0	3:1	1	1	0	0	3:1	1	0	1	0	0:0
Jedinstvo Bijelo Polje	2005	2017	14	10	4	0	34:6	8	6	2	0	23:3	6	4	2	0	11:3
Jezero Plav	2008	2021	7	5	2	0	15:7	3	3	0	0	8:3	4	2	2	0	7:4
OFK Kikinda	1992	1993	2	1	0	1	5:2	1	1	0	0	4:0	1	0	0	1	1:2
Kom Podgorica	2006	2020	20	16	3	1	37:11	10	6	2	0	20:3	10	8	1	1	17:8
Lokomotiva Zagreb	1946	1950	8	2	1	5	13:14	4	2	1	1	10:5	4	0	0	4	3:9
Loznica	1994	1996	6	3	1	2	10:7	3	3	0	0	7:1	3	0	1	2	3:6
Lovćen Cetinje	2007	2019	34	20	8	6	59:23	18	13	3	2	42:9	16	7	5	4	17:14
Milicionar Beograd	1998	2001	5	2	0	3	7:11	2	2	0	0	3:1	3	0	0	3	4:10
Mladost Bački Jarak	1996	1996	2	1	1	0	1:0	1	1	0	0	1:0	1	0	1	0	0:0
Mladost Lučani	1996	1998	6	4	0	2	9:4	3	3	0	0	8:2	3	1	0	2	1:2
Mornar Bar	2009	2019	22	16	2	4	45:16	13	10	0	3	32:10	9	6	2	1	13:6
Mogren Budva	1992	2015	32	13	7	12	45:35	15	7	1	7	26:18	17	6	6	5	19:17
Nafta Lendava	1946	1947	2	1	0	1	9:2	1	1	0	0	9:0	1	0	0	1	0:2
Naša Krila Zemun	1948	1950	4	1	2	1	6:6	2	1	1	0	5:3	2	0	1	1	1:3
Napredak Kruševac	1976	2001	22	9	4	9	27:24	11	8	3	0	19:4	11	1	1	9	8:20
Novi Sad	1962	1963	2	0	1	1	1:2	1	0	0	1	1:2	1	0	1	0	0:0
Obilić Beograd	1994	2006	19	7	4	8	20:30	9	6	1	2	14:9	10	1	3	6	6:21
Olimpija Ljubljana	1975	1991	22	7	7	8	20:24	11	6	4	1	14:8	11	1	3	7	6:16
Osijek	1955	1991	28	12	8	8	35:28	14	11	3	0	27:5	14	1	5	8	8:23
Pelister Bitola	1991	1992	2	1	1	0	3:1	6	1	0	0	2:0	1	0	1	0	1:1
Partizan	1946	2006	75	12	15	48	57:156	37	11	8	18	41:60	38	1	7	30	16:96
OFK Petrovac	2006	2021	49	28	15	6	92:35	24	14	6	4	55:22	25	14	9	2	37:13
Podgorica	2019	2021	8	5	1	2	9:8	4	1	0	1	4:2	4	2	1	1	5:6
Ponziana Trieste	1946	1949	4	2	2	0	6:2	2	1	1	0	3:2	2	1	1	0	3:0
Priština	1983	1998	13	5	3	5	13:12	7	5	2	0	12:3	6	0	1	5	1:9
Proleter Zrenjanin	1990	2000	25	9	5	11	30:33	13	9	3	1	24:9	12	0	2	10	6:24
Rad	1987	2006	27	7	6	14	26:41	12	7	2	3	18:10	15	0	4	11	8:30
Radnički Beograd	1955	2005	22	9	2	11	24:39	11	8	1	2	18:10	11	1	1	9	6:29
Radnički Kragujevac	1975	2001	7	3	2	2	8:6	4	3	0	1	6:3	3	0	2	1	2:3
Radnički Niš	1975	2001	46	20	8	18	47:46	23	18	4	1	37:11	23	3	4	16	10:35
Rijeka	1946	1991	40	14	11	15	41:46	20	13	4	3	34:18	20	1	7	12	7:28
Rudar Pljevlja	1995	2020	47	19	13	15	51:44	23	12	7	4	26:21	24	7	6	11	25:23
Sarajevo	1950	1992	46	14	13	19	53:57	23	12	8	3	34:15	23	2	5	16	19:42
Sloboda Tuzla	1959	1992	38	13	5	20	40:48	19	13	4	2	30:10	19	0	1	19	10:38
Sloboda Užice	1994	1995	4	1	3	0	5:1	2	1	1	0	4:0	2	0	2	0	1:1
Smederevo	1998	2006	10	1	4	5	5:11	5	1	2	2	3:4	5	0	2	3	2:7
Spartak Subotica	1946	2000	29	13	6	10	41:37	15	11	3	1	28:6	14	2	3	9	13:31
Split	1957	1958	2	2	0	0	6:1	1	1	0	0	4:1	1	1	0	0	2:0
Sutjeska Nikšić	1984	2021	71	32	23	16	107:70	36	22	10	4	66:33	35	10	13	12	41:37
Teteks Tetovo	1981	1982	2	1	0	1	5:4	1	1	0	0	4:2	1	0	0	1	1:2
OFK Titograd	2006	2021	42	28	8	6	77:37	22	15	4	3	42:20	20	13	4	3	35:17
Trepča Kosovska Mitrovica	1977	1978	2	1	1	0	4:1	1	1	0	0	4:1	1	0	1	0	0:0
Vardar Skopje	1946	1992	34	13	11	10	44:41	17	12	5	0	31:10	17	1	6	10	13:31
Velež Mostar	1955	1992	46	13	11	22	50:63	23	12	8	3	35:17	23	1	3	19	15:46
Vojvodina	1948	2006	70	25	12	33	73:112	35	20	7	8	53:34	35	5	5	25	20:78
Voždovac	2005	2006	2	1	0	1	3:4	1	1	0	0	2:0	1	0	0	1	1:4
Zagreb	1955	1982	16	7	5	4	23:18	8	6	2	0	17:3	7	1	3	4	6:15
Zemun	1982	2006	31	7	12	13	28:43	15	5	8	3	12:10	16	2	4	10	16:33
Zeta Golubovci	2000	2021	54	28	16	10	82:42	29	17	8	4	47:19	25	10	8	6	35:23
Železničar Niš	1946	1947	2	1	0	1	4:3	1	1	0	0	3:1	1	0	0	1	1:2
Železnik	1997	2005	10	5	2	3	13:12	6	5	1	0	11:3	4	0	1	3	2:9
Željezničar Sarajevo	1946	1992	42	13	11	18	56:61	21	12	5	4	39:17	21	1	6	14	17:44

F - First game; L - Last game

==== First League playoffs ====
At the end of seven seasons, FK Budućnost played in the playoffs for placement in the First League. After the season 1994–95, as a champion of First 'B' League, the team played playoffs for placement to UEFA Cup.

Year	Playoff	Round	Opponent	Home	Away
1952	First League playoffs	Group stage	Pobeda Prilep	5:2	1:6
1952	First League playoffs	Group stage	Spartak Subotica	4:3	1:1
1953	First League playoffs	Group stage	Radnički Beograd	1:2	1:3
1953	First League playoffs	Group stage	Rabotnički Skopje	1:1	1:3
1969	First League playoffs	Semifinals	Trepča Kosovska Mitrovica	3:0	0:1
1969	First League playoffs	Final	Sloboda Tuzla	0:3	1:1
1970	First League playoffs	Semifinals	Sloga Kraljevo	2:0*	0:2
1971	First League playoffs	Semifinals	Vardar Skopje	1:1	0:3
1972	First League playoffs	Semifinals	Priština	1:0	2:2
1972	First League playoffs	Final	Spartak Subotica	1:0	1:2*
1973	First League playoffs	Semifinals	Maribor	1:0*	0:1
1995	Playoffs for UEFA Cup	Final	Vojvodina	3:1	2:5
1996	First League playoffs	Final	Budućnost Valjevo	3:0	0:1
1997	First League playoffs	Final	Loznica	1:0	0:0

* - penalties

==== First League attendances ====
Below is the list of attendance at FK Budućnost First League home games by every single season.

Season	League	Average	Total	Games	Highest	Lowest
1946/47	Yugoslav First League	4,077	53,000	13	6,000 (vs. Partizan)	2,000 (vs. Nafta)
1948/49	Yugoslav First League	2,194	39,500	18	5,500 (vs. Hajduk)	3,000 (vs. Ponziana)
1949/50	Yugoslav First League	2,889	52,000	18	8,000 (vs. Partizan, Hajduk)	4,000 (vs. Naša Krila)
1955/56	Yugoslav First League	7,000	91,000	13	13,000 (vs. Crvena zvezda)	4,000 (vs. Radnički Beograd)
1956/57	Yugoslav First League	6,154	80,000	13	8,000 (vs. Partizan)	5,000 (vs. Zagreb, Spartak)
1957/58	Yugoslav First League	6,539	85,000	13	8,000 (vs. Dinamo, Partizan)	4,000 (vs. Zagreb)
1958/59	Yugoslav First League	5,909	65,000	11	10,000 (vs. Crvena zvezda)	3,000 (vs. Željezničar)
1962/63	Yugoslav First League	8,000	104,000	13	15,000 (vs. Partizan)	4,000 (vs. Vojvodina)
1975/76	Yugoslav First League	12,765	217,000	17	20,000 (vs. Hajduk)	4,000 (vs. Borac Banja Luka)
1976/77	Yugoslav First League	9,177	156,000	17	16,000 (vs. Partizan)	5,000 (vs. OFK Beograd)
1977/78	Yugoslav First League	11,000	187,000	17	16,000 (vs. Crvena zvezda)	6,000 (vs. Sloboda Tuzla)
1978/79	Yugoslav First League	10,235	174,000	17	18,000 (vs. Crvena zvezda)	3,000 (vs. Sloboda Tuzla)
1979/80	Yugoslav First League	6,294	107,000	17	18,000 (vs. Partizan)	1,000 (vs. Čelik Zenica)
1980/81	Yugoslav First League	7,941	135,000	17	16,000 (vs. Hajduk)	2,000 (vs. Zagreb)
1981/82	Yugoslav First League	6,235	106,000	17	19,000 (vs. Crvena zvezda)	3,000 (vs. Osijek, Radnički Niš)
1982/83	Yugoslav First League	4,941	84,000	17	15,000 (vs. Partizan)	1,000 (vs. Zemun)
1983/84	Yugoslav First League	6,000	102,000	17	17,000 (vs. Partizan)	2,000 (vs. Cibalia)
1984/85	Yugoslav First League	5,029	85,500	17	12,000 (vs. Hajduk)	2,000 (vs. Radnički Niš)
1985/86	Yugoslav First League	6,059	103,000	17	14,000 (vs. Partizan)	3,000 (vs. Sloboda Tuzla, Priština)
1986/87	Yugoslav First League	5,147	87,500	17	10,000 (vs. Sutjeska, Partizan)	1,500 (vs. Spartak)
1987/88	Yugoslav First League	4,824	82,000	17	9,000 (vs. Crvena zvezda)	2,500 (vs. Radnički Niš)
1988/89	Yugoslav First League	3,471	59,000	17	10,000 (vs. Crvena zvezda)	1,500 (vs. Željezničar)
1989/90	Yugoslav First League	3,875	62,000	16	10,000 (vs. Partizan)	1,000 (vs. Željezničar)
1990/91	Yugoslav First League	3,183	57,300	18	12,000 (vs. Crvena zvezda)	300 (vs. Zemun)
1991/92	Yugoslav First League	2,086	29,200	14	10,000 (vs. Crvena zvezda)	400 (vs. Pelister)
1992/93	FR Yugoslavia First League	1,839	33,100	18	8,000 (vs. Partizan)	300 (vs. Vojvodina)
1993/94	FR Yugoslavia First League	2,878	51,800	18	7,000 (vs. C. zvezda, Partizan)	300 (vs. OFK Beograd)
1994/95	FR Yugoslavia First League	989	17,800	18	2,500 (vs. Sutjeska)	300 (vs. Loznica)
1995/96	FR Yugoslavia First League	1,472	26,500	18	5,000 (vs. Crvena zvezda)	200 (vs. Mladost Bački Jarak)
1996/97	FR Yugoslavia First League	2,025	32,400	16	6,000 (vs. Partizan)	500 (vs. Proleter)
1997/98	FR Yugoslavia First League	1,688	27,000	16	5,000 (vs. Crvena zvezda)	500 (vs. Obilić)
1998/99	FR Yugoslavia First League	1,725	20,700	12	7,000 (vs. Crvena zvezda)	500 (vs. Zemun)
1999/00	FR Yugoslavia First League	1,675	33,500	20	8,000 (vs. Partizan)	300 (vs. Spartak)
2000/01	FR Yugoslavia First League	2,459	41,800	17	7,000 (vs. Partizan, C. zvezda)	500 (vs. Milicionar)
2004/05	SCG First League	5,269	68,500	13	10,000 (vs. Partizan)	2,500 (vs. Haduk Beograd)
2005/06	SCG First League	4,933	74,000	15	8,000 (vs. Zeta, C. zvezda)	2,000 (vs. Jedinstvo)
2006/07	Montenegrin First League	2,470	42,000	17	10,000 (vs. Zeta)	500 (vs. Dečić)
2007/08	Montenegrin First League	4,250	68,000	16	9,000 (vs. Mogren)	1,500 (vs. OFK Titograd)
2008/09	Montenegrin First League	4,117	70,000	17	6,000 (vs. Mogren)	800 (vs. Jezero)
2009/10	Montenegrin First League	2,623	44,600	17	6,000 (vs. Mogren)	300 (vs. Berane)
2010/11	Montenegrin First League	2,058	35,000	17	4,000 (vs. Mogren)	400 (vs. Lovćen)
2011/12	Montenegrin First League	2,607	36,500	14	5,000 (vs. Zeta, Rudar, Lovćen)	700 (vs. Berane)
2012/13	Montenegrin First League	1,862	24,200	13	4,500 (vs. Grbalj)	500 (vs. Mornar)
2013/14	Montenegrin First League	1,100	13,200	12	3,000 (vs. Čelik)	400 (vs. Grbalj)
2014/15	Montenegrin First League	994	15,900	16	3,000 (vs. Sutjeska)	300 (vs. Berane)
2015/16	Montenegrin First League	1,195	20,300	17	4,000 (vs. Sutjeska)	300 (vs. Grbalj)
2016/17	Montenegrin First League	2,015	28,200	14	5,000 (vs. OFK Titograd)	500 (vs. Lovćen)
2017/18	Montenegrin First League	1,200	15,600	13	4,000 (vs. Dečić)	300 (vs. Petrovac)
2018/19	Montenegrin First League	1,067	19,200	18	2,000 (vs. Sutjeska, Lovćen)	300 (vs. Grbalj)
2019/20	Montenegrin First League	1,050	12,600	12	2,500 (vs. Sutjeska)	400 (vs. Grbalj)
2020/21	Season played without attendance due to the coronavirus pandemic					

=== National Cup ===
FK Budućnost participated in 54 seasons of national Cup competition, since 1947. During their history, Budućnost played in Yugoslav Cup, FR Yugoslavia Cup and, since the 2006–07 season, in Montenegrin Cup.
Budućnost played eight times in the final matches of national cup - two times in the final of SFR Yugoslavia Cup (1963/64 and 1968/69) and six times in the final of Montenegrin Cup (2007/08, 2009/10, 2012/13, 2015/16, 2018/19 and 2020/21). The club won four trophies, in the seasons 2012/13, 2018/19, 2020/21 and 2021/22.

Season	Competition	Round	Match	Result
1947	Yugoslav Cup	Round one	Budućnost - Yugoslav Army Skopje	2:2
1947	Yugoslav Cup	Round two	Budućnost - Metalac Beograd	3:1
1947	Yugoslav Cup	Round of 16	Rudar Pljevlja - Budućnost	3:2
1948	Yugoslav Cup	Round one	Budućnost - Teteks Tetovo	3:0
1948	Yugoslav Cup	Round of 16	Hajduk Split - Budućnost	0:2
1948	Yugoslav Cup	Quarterfinals	Naša Krila Zemun - Budućnost	4:1
1950	Yugoslav Cup	Round one	Sutjeska Nikšić - Budućnost	0:2
1950	Yugoslav Cup	Round of 16	Budućnost - Spartak Subotica	0:0*
1950	Yugoslav Cup	Quarterfinals	Radnički Beograd - Budućnost	4:0
1951	Yugoslav Cup	Round one	Lovćen Cetinje - Budućnost	2:0
1955	Yugoslav Cup	Round of 16	Hajduk Split - Budućnost	4:2
1956/57	Yugoslav Cup	Round of 16	Olimpija Ljubljana - Budućnost	2:4
1956/57	Yugoslav Cup	Quarterfinals	Budućnost - Vojvodina	2:0
1956/57	Yugoslav Cup	Semifinals	Radnički Beograd - Budućnost	3:1
1957/58	Yugoslav Cup	Round of 16	Crvena Zvezda Beograd - Budućnost	3:1
1958/59	Yugoslav Cup	Round one	Budućnost - Sutjeska Nikšić	3:2
1958/59	Yugoslav Cup	Round of 16	Budućnost - Yugoslav Army Podgorica	1:2
1959/60	Yugoslav Cup	Round one	Radnički Beograd - Budućnost	1:1*
1959/60	Yugoslav Cup	Round of 16	Budućnost - Željezničar Sarajevo	0:1
1960/61	Yugoslav Cup	Round one	Partizan - Budućnost	3:1
1961/62	Yugoslav Cup	Round one	Budućnost - Željezničar Sarajevo	3:1
1961/62	Yugoslav Cup	Round of 16	OFK Beograd - Budućnost	1:0
1962/63	Yugoslav Cup	Round one	Olimpija Ljubljana - Budućnost	2:4
1962/63	Yugoslav Cup	Round of 16	Vardar Skopje - Budućnost	2:1
1963/64	Yugoslav Cup	Round of 16	Budućnost - Železničar Niš	1:0
1963/64	Yugoslav Cup	Quarterfinals	Partizan - Budućnost	3:2
1964/65	Yugoslav Cup	Round one	Sutjeska Nikšić - Budućnost	2:3
1964/65	Yugoslav Cup	Round of 16	Budućnost - Radnički Beograd	1:0
1964/65	Yugoslav Cup	Quarterfinals	Budućnost - OFK Beograd	3:2
1964/65	Yugoslav Cup	Semifinals	Vardar Skopje - Budućnost	0:2
1964/65	Yugoslav Cup	Final	Budućnost - Dinamo Zagreb	1:2
1967/68	Yugoslav Cup	Round of 16	Maribor - Budućnost	3:1
1968/69	Yugoslav Cup	Round of 16	Budućnost - Partizan	2:3
1976/77	Yugoslav Cup	Round one	Pobeda Prilep - Budućnost	1:3
1976/77	Yugoslav Cup	Round of 16	Budućnost - Rudar Kakanj	1:0
1976/77	Yugoslav Cup	Quarterfinals	Budućnost - Sarajevo	3:2
1976/77	Yugoslav Cup	Semifinals	Radnički Niš - Budućnost	1:1*
1976/77	Yugoslav Cup	Final	Budućnost - Hajduk Split	0:2
1977/78	Yugoslav Cup	Round one	Sarajevo - Budućnost	3:1
1978/79	Yugoslav Cup	Round one	Crvena Zvezda Beograd - Budućnost	4:1
1979/80	Yugoslav Cup	Round one	Budućnost - Grobničan Čavle	2:1
1979/80	Yugoslav Cup	Round of 16	Leotar Trebinje - Budućnost	0:0*
1980/81	Yugoslav Cup	Round one	Budućnost - Hajduk Split	4:0
1980/81	Yugoslav Cup	Round of 16	Budućnost - Crvena Zvezda Beograd	2:1
1980/81	Yugoslav Cup	Quarterfinals	Orijent Sušak - Budućnost	0:0*
1980/81	Yugoslav Cup	Semifinals	Velež Mostar - Budućnost	2:1
1981/82	Yugoslav Cup	Round one	Budućnost - Croatia Zürich	5:0
1981/82	Yugoslav Cup	Round of 16	Vojvodina - Budućnost	0:1
1981/82	Yugoslav Cup	Quarterfinals	Sloboda Tuzla - Budućnost	0:0*
1982/83	Yugoslav Cup	Round one	Spartak Subotica - Budućnost	0:1
1982/83	Yugoslav Cup	Round of 16	Hajduk Split - Budućnost	5:0
1983/84	Yugoslav Cup	Round one	GOŠK-Jug - Budućnost	3:1
1984/85	Yugoslav Cup	Round one	Zadar - Budućnost	0:4
1984/85	Yugoslav Cup	Round of 16	Budućnost - Iskra Bugojno	0:1
1985/86	Yugoslav Cup	Round one	Samobor - Budućnost	0:1
1985/86	Yugoslav Cup	Round of 16	Budućnost - Rijeka	1:0
1985/86	Yugoslav Cup	Quarterfinals	OFK Beograd - Budućnost	4:1
1986/87	Yugoslav Cup	Round one	Neretva Metković - Budućnost	0:1
1986/87	Yugoslav Cup	Round of 16	Budućnost - Velež Mostar	2:3, 2:0
1986/87	Yugoslav Cup	Quarterfinals	Budućnost - Radnički Kragujevac	4:0, 0:1
1986/87	Yugoslav Cup	Semifinals	Rijeka - Budućnost	2:1, 1:1
1987/88	Yugoslav Cup	Round one	Rabotnički Skopje - Budućnost	1:2
1987/88	Yugoslav Cup	Round of 16	Crvena Zvezda Beograd - Budućnost	2:0, 0:2*
1988/89	Yugoslav Cup	Round one	Kabel Novi Sad - Budućnost	0:4
1988/89	Yugoslav Cup	Round of 16	Partizan - Budućnost	3:0, 2:1
1989/90	Yugoslav Cup	Round one	Guber Srebrenica - Budućnost	1:2
1989/90	Yugoslav Cup	Round of 16	Sloboda Tuzla - Budućnost	2:0, 0:3
1989/90	Yugoslav Cup	Quarterfinals	Crvena Zvezda Beograd - Budućnost	5:1, 3:0
1990/91	Yugoslav Cup	Round one	Budućnost - Sloboda Užice	1:0
1990/91	Yugoslav Cup	Round of 16	Budućnost - Partizan	2:0, 1:0
1990/91	Yugoslav Cup	Quarterfinals	Budućnost - OFK Beograd	1:2, 1:1
1991/92	Yugoslav Cup	Round one	Budućnost - Crvena Zvezda Beograd	0:2
1992/93	FR Yugoslavia Cup	Round one	Radnički Sombor - Budućnost	1:2
1992/93	FR Yugoslavia Cup	Round of 16	Vojvodina - Budućnost	2:2, 1:1
1992/93	FR Yugoslavia Cup	Quarterfinals	Zastava Kragujevac - Budućnost	1:1, 2:2
1993/94	FR Yugoslavia Cup	Round one	Bečej - Budućnost	6:0
1994/95	FR Yugoslavia Cup	Round one	ČSK Čelarevo - Budućnost	0:1
1994/95	FR Yugoslavia Cup	Round of 16	Budućnost - Napredak Kruševac	1:0, 0:2
1995/96	FR Yugoslavia Cup	Round one	Budućnost - Dinamo Pančevo	3:3*
1995/96	FR Yugoslavia Cup	Round of 16	Rad - Budućnost	4:0, 0:1
1996/97	FR Yugoslavia Cup	Round one	Radnički Sombor - Budućnost	1:2
1996/97	FR Yugoslavia Cup	Round of 16	BSK Batajnica - Budućnost	1:0, 0:1*
1997/98	FR Yugoslavia Cup	Round one	Budućnost - OFK Beograd	2:1
1997/98	FR Yugoslavia Cup	Round of 16	Čukarički - Budućnost	3:0, 5:0
1998/99	FR Yugoslavia Cup	Round one	Budućnost - Budućnost Valjevo	2:1
1998/99	FR Yugoslavia Cup	Round of 16	Budućnost - Smederevo	2:2, 0:1
1999/00	FR Yugoslavia Cup	Round one	Zeta Golubovci - Budućnost	2:2*
2000/01	FR Yugoslavia Cup	Round one	Budućnost - Železničar Lajkovac	0:1
2001/02	FR Yugoslavia Cup	Round one	Radnički Klupci - Budućnost	0:0*
2001/02	FR Yugoslavia Cup	Round of 16	Budućnost - Železnik	0:1
2004/05	SCG Cup	Round one	Budućnost - Borac Čačak	3:1
2004/05	SCG Cup	Round of 16	Budućnost - Smederevo	0:0*
2005/06	SCG Cup	Round one	Vlasina Vlasotince - Budućnost	1:0
2006/07	Montenegrin Cup	Round one	Bijela - Budućnost	0:4
2006/07	Montenegrin Cup	Round of 16	Budućnost - Zeta Golubovci	2:0, 0:3
2007/08	Montenegrin Cup	Round one	Grafičar Podgorica - Budućnost	0:2
2007/08	Montenegrin Cup	Round of 16	Budućnost - Kom Podgorica	3:0, 3:0
2007/08	Montenegrin Cup	Quarterfinals	Zeta Golubovci - Budućnost	0:0, 1:2
2007/08	Montenegrin Cup	Semifinals	Berane - Budućnost	0:0, 0:4
2007/08	Montenegrin Cup	Final	Budućnost - Mogren Budva	1:1 - 5:6*
2008/09	Montenegrin Cup	Round of 16	Budućnost - Dečić Tuzi	4:0, 2:0
2008/09	Montenegrin Cup	Quarterfinals	Budućnost - Mornar Bar	3:1, 0:0
2008/09	Montenegrin Cup	Semifinals	Budućnost - Lovćen Cetinje	1:2, 1:0
2009/10	Montenegrin Cup	Round one	Budućnost - Otrant Ulcinj	2:1
2009/10	Montenegrin Cup	Round of 16	Budućnost - Lovćen Cetinje	2:0, 2:0
2009/10	Montenegrin Cup	Quarterfinals	Budućnost - Sutjeska Nikšić	1:1, 1:0
2009/10	Montenegrin Cup	Semifinals	Grbalj Radanovići - Budućnost	0:1, 2:3
2009/10	Montenegrin Cup	Final	Budućnost - Rudar Pljevlja	1:2
2010/11	Montenegrin Cup	Round of 16	Gornja Zeta Golubovci - Budućnost	0:4, 0:6
2010/11	Montenegrin Cup	Quarterfinals	Budućnost - Petrovac	0:0, 0:2
2011/12	Montenegrin Cup	Round one	Kom Podgorica - Budućnost	0:3
2011/12	Montenegrin Cup	Round of 16	Bokelj Kotor - Budućnost	3:0, 0:2
2012/13	Montenegrin Cup	Round one	Budućnost - Bratstvo Cijevna	3:0
2012/13	Montenegrin Cup	Round of 16	Budućnost - Jedinstvo Bijelo Polje	2:1, 1:0
2012/13	Montenegrin Cup	Quarterfinals	Budućnost - Zeta Golubovci	2:0, 2:0
2012/13	Montenegrin Cup	Semifinals	OFK Titograd - Budućnost	1:1, 2:3
2012/13	Montenegrin Cup	Final	Budućnost - Čelik Nikšić	1:0
2013/14	Montenegrin Cup	Round of 16	Budućnost - Dečić Tuzi	0:3 - dnp
2014/15	Montenegrin Cup	Round one	Jezero Plav - Budućnost	1:2
2014/15	Montenegrin Cup	Round of 16	Pljevlja - Budućnost	0:4, 0:9
2014/15	Montenegrin Cup	Quarterfinals	Grbalj Radanovići - Budućnost	0:0, 0:1
2014/15	Montenegrin Cup	Semifinals	Petrovac - Budućnost	0:0, 1:0
2015/16	Montenegrin Cup	Round one	Budućnost - Berane	5:0
2015/16	Montenegrin Cup	Round of 16	Grbalj Radanovići - Budućnost	1:2, 0:4
2015/16	Montenegrin Cup	Quarterfinals	Budućnost - Zeta Golubovci	2:0, 0:0
2015/16	Montenegrin Cup	Semifinals	Budućnost - Lovćen Cetinje	2:0, 1:1
2015/16	Montenegrin Cup	Final	Budućnost - Rudar Pljevlja	0:0 - 3:4*
2016/17	Montenegrin Cup	Round of 16	Kom Podgorica - Budućnost	1:5, 0:1
2016/17	Montenegrin Cup	Quarterfinals	Budućnost - Grbalj Radanovići	2:1, 0:1
2017/18	Montenegrin Cup	Round one	Budućnost - Jedinstvo Bijelo Polje	5:0
2017/18	Montenegrin Cup	Round of 16	Budućnost - Iskra Danilovgrad	2:0, 2:0
2017/18	Montenegrin Cup	Quarterfinals	Budućnost - Sutjeska Nikšić	2:0, 1:0
2017/18	Montenegrin Cup	Semifinals	Budućnost - OFK Titograd	1:2, 2:1 - 3:4
2018/19	Montenegrin Cup	Round of 16	Rudar Pljevlja - Budućnost	0:0, 0:1
2018/19	Montenegrin Cup	Quarterfinals	Budućnost - Podgorica	1:1, 1:0
2018/19	Montenegrin Cup	Semifinals	Budućnost - Sutjeska Nikšić	0:0, 1:1
2018/19	Montenegrin Cup	Final	Budućnost - Lovćen Cetinje	4:0
2019/20	Montenegrin Cup	Round of 16	Rudar Pljevlja - Budućnost	0:0, 1:2
2019/20	Montenegrin Cup	Quarterfinals	Jedinstvo Bijelo Polje - Budućnost	0:1, 0:7
2019/20	Montenegrin Cup	Competition was interrupted due to COVID-19		
2020/21	Montenegrin Cup	Round of 16	Budućnost - Rudar Pljevlja	3:1
2020/21	Montenegrin Cup	Quarterfinals	Bokelj Kotor - Budućnost	0:6
2020/21	Montenegrin Cup	Semifinals	Zeta Golubovci - Budućnost	2:1, 0:3
2020/21	Montenegrin Cup	Final	Budućnost - Dečić Tuzi	3:1
2021/22	Montenegrin Cup	Round of 16	Jezero Plav - Budućnost	1:3
2021/22	Montenegrin Cup	Quarterfinals	Budućnost - Rudar Pljevlja	2:0
2021/22	Montenegrin Cup	Semifinals	Budućnost - Sutjeska Nikšić	3:0, 2:1
2021/22	Montenegrin Cup	Final	Budućnost - Dečić Tuzi	1:0
2022/23	Montenegrin Cup	Round of 16	Dečić Tuzi - Budućnost	1:1 - 5:4*

* - penalties

== Seasons in international competitions ==
FK Budućnost is Montenegrin club with most played seasons and matches in European football competitions. Except participation in UEFA competitions, during the history Budućnost played twice in the Balkans Cup.
Below is the table with FK Budućnost scores in international competitions by opponents' countries.

Overall								UEFA Competitions					Balkans Cup				
Opponents' country	F	L	G	W	D	L	GD	G	W	D	L	GD	G	W	D	L	GD
Albania	1977	2011	6	3	2	1	8:6	2	1	0	1	3:4	4	2	2	0	5:2
Azerbaijan	2010	2010	2	1	0	1	4:2	2	1	1	0	4:2	0	0	0	0	0:0
Austria	1981	1981	2	1	0	1	4:3	2	1	0	1	4:3	0	0	0	0	0:0
Belgium	2016	2016	2	1	0	1	2:2	2	1	0	1	2:2	0	0	0	0	0:0
Bosnia and Herzegovina	2020	2020	1	0	0	1	1:2	1	0	0	1	1:2	0	0	0	0	0:0
Bulgaria	2020	2020	1	0	0	1	1:3	1	0	0	1	1:3	0	0	0	0	0:0
Croatia	2007	2007	2	0	1	1	1:2	2	0	1	1	1:2	0	0	0	0	0:0
Cyprus	1995	2014	3	0	2	1	1:3	3	0	2	1	1:3	0	0	0	0	0:0
Denmark	1981	2010	4	1	1	2	6:6	4	1	1	2	6:6	0	0	0	0	0:0
Estonia	1995	2019	3	3	0	0	9:2	3	3	0	0	9:2	0	0	0	0	0:0
Finland	2008	2008	2	0	1	1	2:3	2	0	1	1	2:3	0	0	0	0	0:0
Germany	1995	1995	1	0	0	1	0:3	1	0	0	1	0:3	0	0	0	0	0:0
Greece	1977	1995	3	0	1	2	6:8	1	0	0	1	3:4	2	0	1	1	3:4
Kazakhstan	2020	2020	1	1	0	0	1:0	1	1	0	0	1:0	0	0	0	0	0:0
Latvia	2015	2015	2	0	1	1	1:3	2	0	1	1	1:3	0	0	0	0	0:0
North Macedonia	2016	2016	2	1	1	0	2:1	2	1	1	0	2:1	0	0	0	0	0:0
Malta	2005	2005	2	1	1	0	7:2	2	1	1	0	7:2	0	0	0	0	0:0
Poland	2009	2012	4	2	0	2	2:4	4	2	0	2	2:4	0	0	0	0	0:0
Romania	1990	1990	2	0	1	1	0:1	0	0	0	0	0:0	2	0	1	1	0:1
San Marino	2014	2014	2	2	0	0	5:1	2	2	0	0	5:1	0	0	0	0	0:0
Serbia	2017	2017	2	0	1	1	0:2	2	0	0	1	0:2	0	0	0	0	0:0
Slovakia	2018	2018	2	0	1	1	1:3	2	0	1	1	1:3	0	0	0	0	0:0
Spain	2005	2005	2	1	0	1	2:4	2	1	0	1	2:4	0	0	0	0	0:0
Sweden	1981	1981	2	1	1	0	3:1	2	1	1	0	3:1	0	0	0	0	0:0
Turkey	1990	1990	2	0	2	0	1:1	0	0	0	0	0:0	2	0	2	0	1:1
Ukraine	2019	2019	2	0	0	2	1:4	2	0	0	2	1:4	0	0	0	0	0:0

F - First game; L - Last game

=== UEFA competitions ===
FK Budućnost debuted in European competitions at 1981, when they played in Intertoto Cup. In the next decades, Budućnost played in the same competition twice, with notable victory against Deportivo La Coruña (2:1) at 2006.

After the Montenegrin independence, Budućnost became standard participant of UEFA competitions, and played five seasons in the Champions League qualifiers. In recent period, most successful European season of Budućnost was 2016/17 in UEFA Europa League. After eliminating Macedonian side Rabotnički, Budućnost almost made surprise against K.R.C. Genk (2:0 in Podgorica after 0:2 in Genk in first match), but lost on penalties.

==== Overall ====
Competition	Seasons	First	Last	Pld	W	D	L	GF	GA	GD
UEFA Champions League	4	2008-09	2020-21	7	1	2	4	4	10	–6
UEFA Europa League	10	2007-08	2020-21	28	10	5	13	30	32	–2
Intertoto Cup	3	1981-82	2005-06	14	6	4	4	28	22	4
UEFA Europa Conference League	1	2021–22	2022–23	6	2	1	3	6	11	–5
OVERALL	17 seasons			55	19	12	24	68	71	–2

==== Matches by season ====
Season	Competition	Round	Club	Home	Away	Aggregate
1981	Intertoto Cup	Group 4	(Austria) Wacker Innsbruck	1–2	3–1	1st
1981	Intertoto Cup	Group 4	(Sweden) Östers	3–1	0–0	1st
1981	Intertoto Cup	Group 4	(Denmark) Odense	4–2	1–1	1st
1995	UEFA Intertoto Cup	Group 7	(Estonia) Tervis Pärnu	—N/a	3–1	4th
1995	UEFA Intertoto Cup	Group 7	(Cyprus) Nea Salamis Famagusta	1–1	—N/a	4th
1995	UEFA Intertoto Cup	Group 7	(Germany) Bayer Leverkusen	—N/a	0–3	4th
1995	UEFA Intertoto Cup	Group 7	(Greece) OFI	3–4	—N/a	4th
2005	UEFA Intertoto Cup	1R	(Malta) Valletta	2–2	5–0	7–2
2005	UEFA Intertoto Cup	2R	(Spain) Deportivo La Coruña	2–1	0–3	2–4
2007–08	UEFA Cup	1QR	(Croatia) Hajduk Split	1–1	0–1	1–2
2008–09	UEFA Champions League	1QR	(Finland) Tampere United	1–1	1–2	2–3
2009–10	UEFA Europa League	1QR	(Poland) Polonia Warsaw	0–2	1–0	1–2
2010–11	UEFA Europa League	2QR	(Azerbaijan) Baku	1–2	3–0 (Note: UEFA awarded Budućnost Podgorica a 3–0 win due to Baku fielding a suspended player. The original match had ended in a 2–1 win for Baku.)	4–2
2010–11	UEFA Europa League	3QR	(Denmark) Brøndby	1–2	0–1	1–3
2011–12	UEFA Europa League	1QR	(Albania) Flamurtari	1–3	2–1	3–4
2012–13	UEFA Champions League	2QR	(Poland) Śląsk Wrocław	0–2	1–0	1–2
2014–15	UEFA Europa League	1QR	(San Marino) Folgore	3–0	2–1	5–1
2014–15	UEFA Europa League	2QR	(Cyprus) Omonia	0–0	0–2	0–2
2015–16	UEFA Europa League	1QR	(Latvia) Spartaks Jūrmala	1–3	0–0	1–3
2016–17	UEFA Europa League	1QR	(North Macedonia) Rabotnički	1–0	1–1	2–1
2016–17	UEFA Europa League	2QR	(Belgium) Genk	2–0 (a.e.t.)	0–2	2–2 (2–4 p.)
2017–18	UEFA Champions League	2QR	(Serbia) Partizan	0–0	0–2	0–2
2018–19	UEFA Europa League	1QR	(Slovakia) Trenčín	0–2	1–1	1–3
2019–20	UEFA Europa League	1QR	(Estonia) Narva Trans	4–1	2–0	6–1
2019–20	UEFA Europa League	2QR	(Ukraine) Zorya Luhansk	1–3	0–1	1–4
2020–21	UEFA Champions League	1QR	(Bulgaria) Ludogorets Razgrad	1–3		
2020–21	UEFA Europa League	2QR	(Kazakhstan) Astana	1–0		
2020–21	UEFA Europa League	3QR	(Bosnia and Herzegovina) Sarajevo	1–2		
2021–22	UEFA Champions League	1QR	(Finland) HJK	0–4	1–3	1–7
2021–22	UEFA Europa Conference League	2QR	(Faroe Islands) HB Tórshavn	0–2	0–4	0–6
2022–23	UEFA Europa Conference League	1QR	(Kosovo) Llapi	2–0	2–2	4–2
2022–23	UEFA Europa Conference League	2QR	(Iceland) Breiðablik	2–1	0–2	2–3
2023–24	UEFA Champions League	PR	(Andorra) Atlètic Club d'Escaldes	3–0		
2023–24	UEFA Champions League	PR	(Iceland) Breiðablik	0–5		
2023–24	UEFA Europa Conference League	2QR	(North Macedonia) Struga	3–4	0–1	3–5
2024–25	UEFA Conference League	1QR	(Kosovo) Malisheva	3–0	0–1	3–1
2024–25	UEFA Conference League	2QR	(Bulgaria) CSKA 1948	1–1 (a.e.t.)	0–1	1–2
2025–26	UEFA Champions League	1QR	(Armenia) Noah	2−2	0–1	2–3
2025–26	UEFA Conference League	2QR	(Moldova) Milsami Orhei	0–0	1–2	1–2

=== Other competitions ===
==== Balkans Cup ====
FK Budućnost played two seasons in the Balkans Cup, a regional competition for clubs from Yugoslavia, Albania, Bulgaria, Greece, Romania and Turkey. In their second season, Budućnost eliminated Galatasaray and played in the finals.

===== Matches by season =====
Season	Competition	Round	Club	Home	Away	Aggregate
1977	Balkans Cup	Group B	(Albania) Vllaznia	2–0	1–1	2nd
1977	Balkans Cup	Group B	(Greece) Panathinaikos	1–2	2–2	2nd
1990–91	Balkans Cup	QF	(Albania) 17 Nëntori	2–1	0–0	2–1
1990–91	Balkans Cup	SF	(Turkey) Galatasaray	0–0	1–1	1–1 (a)
1990–91	Balkans Cup	Final	(Romania) Inter Sibiu	0–0	0–1 (a.e.t.)	0–1

== See also ==
- FK Budućnost Podgorica
- SD Budućnost Podgorica
- Montenegrin First League
- Montenegrin clubs in Yugoslav football competitions (1946–2006)
- Montenegrin Derby
