= Milan Radulović (footballer) =

Montenegrin footballer

Personal information
- Full name: Milan Radulović
- Date of birth: 18 August 1981 (age 45)
- Place of birth: Titograd, SFR Yugoslavia
- Height: 1.94 m (6 ft 4 in)
- Position: Defender

Team information
- Current team: Iskra Danilovgrad (manager)

Senior career*
| Years | Team | Apps | (Gls) |
| 2002–2005 | Zeta | 102 | (2) |
| 2005–2006 | GKS Bełchatów | 5 | (0) |
| 2006–2007 | Zeta | 29 | (4) |
| 2007 | Hapoel Kiryat Shmona | 0 | (0) |
| 2007–2008 | Mogren | 33 | (3) |
| 2009 | Dečić | 14 | (1) |
| 2009–2011 | Budućnost Podgorica | 30 | (1) |
| 2011 | Zeta | 6 | (0) |
| 2011–2012 | Dečić | 29 | (1) |
| 2012 | Mladost | 8 | (0) |
| 2013 | Nordvärmlands FF | | |
| 2013–2014 | Mladost | 20 | (1) |

International career
- FR Yugoslavia U21

Managerial career
- 2022–2023: Berane
- 2024–: Iskra Danilovgrad
- * Club domestic league appearances and goals

Milan Radulović (born 18 August 1981) is a Montenegrin professional football manager and former player who is currently in charge of Iskra Danilovgrad.

== Club career ==
Radulović played for GKS Bełchatów. He left Mladost Podgorica for Swedish side Nordvärmlands FF in February 2013.
