= Saša Petrović (footballer) =

Montenegrin footballer (born 1966)

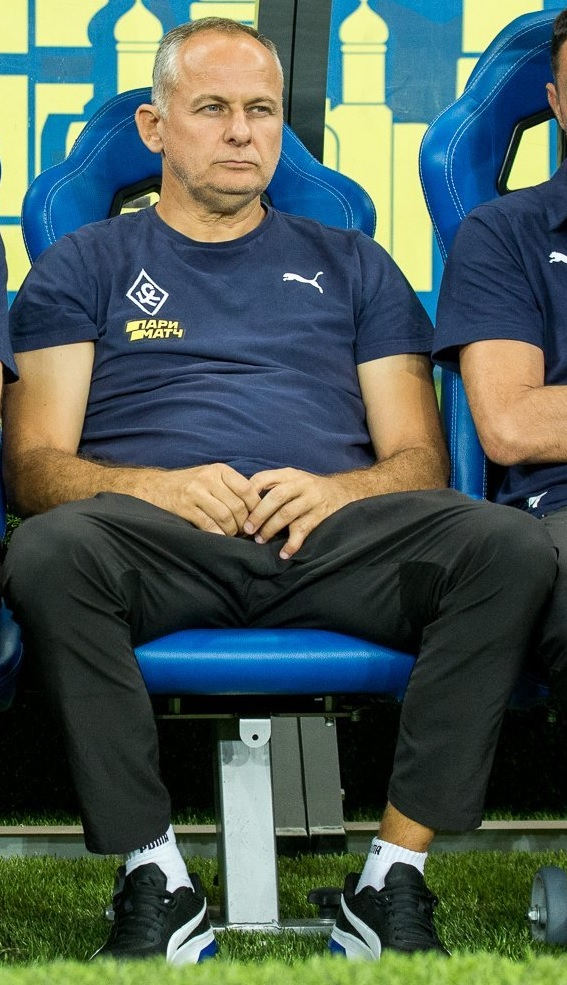
- Petrović in 2019

Personal information
- Date of birth: 31 December 1966 (age 59)
- Place of birth: Titograd, SFR Yugoslavia
- Position: Goalkeeper

Senior career*
Years	Team	Apps	(Gls)
1984–1985	OFK Titograd	1	(0)
1985–1993	Budućnost Podgorica	79	(2)
1989–1990	→ Sutjeska Nikšić (loan)	28	(0)
1993–1995	OFK Beograd	67	(0)
1995	Shandong Jinan Taishan	20	(0)
1996–1997	Chunnam Dragons	32	(0)
1997–1998	Elche CF	12	(0)
1998–1999	OFK Beograd	1	(0)
1999–2000	Shandong Luneng	51	(0)
Total		291	(2)

International career
1998	FR Yugoslavia	1	(0)

Managerial career
- 2006-2007: Kom
- 2007: Budućnost
- 2008-2009: Kom
- 2009-2010: Grbalj
- 2011: Budućnost
- 2012: Sutjeska
- 2012–2013: Mornar Bar
- 2015–2017: Red Star Belgrade (asst)
- 2017–2018: FC Arsenal Tula (condit. coach)
- 2019–2020: PFC Krylia Sovetov Samara (asst)
- * Club domestic league appearances and goals

Saša Petrović (Serbian Cyrillic: Caшa Петровић, born 31 December 1966) is a Montenegrin football manager and former player who played as a goalkeeper.

== Club career ==
After playing for OFK Titograd, he moved to FK Budućnost Podgorica where he would spend almost a decade, being the only exception a loan season at FK Sutjeska Nikšić. Next he played two seasons with OFK Beograd. In 1996, he would sign with another South Korean club, Jeonnam Dragons of K League. In 1997, he will play one season in Spanish Second League club Elche CF before returning to OFK in 1998–99. He finished his career playing again with Shandong until 2000, coached by Serbian manager Slobodan Santrač.

== International career ==
Petrović played one match for the FR Yugoslavia national team on 28 January 1998, in a friendly match against Tunisia, a 3–0 win. He came on as a late substitute for Dragoje Leković.

== Managerial career ==
In August 2015, he became the assistant manager of Miodrag Božović at Serbian SuperLiga side Red Star Belgrade.

== Honours ==
- Shandong Jinan Taishan/Shandong Luneng
  - Chinese Jia-A League: 1999
  - Chinese FA Cup: 1995, 1999
- Chunnam Dragons
  - Korean FA Cup: 1997
