= Goran Jovanović (footballer, born 1977) =

Serbian footballer

Personal information
- Full name: Goran Jovanović
- Date of birth: 8 May 1977 (age 49)
- Place of birth: Zemun, SR Serbia, SFR Yugoslavia
- Height: 1.77 m (5 ft 10 in)
- Position: Midfielder

Senior career*
Years	Team	Apps	(Gls)
1997–1999	Hajduk Kula	12	(0)
2000	Dinamo Pančevo		
2001	Slavia Mozyr	7	(0)
2002–2003	Mogren	29	(0)
2003–2007	Smederevo	50	(4)
2007–2011	Mogren	107	(6)
2011–2012	Grbalj	20	(0)
Total		225	(10)
- * Club domestic league appearances and goals

Goran Jovanović (Serbian Cyrillic: Горан Јовановић; born 8 May 1977) is a Serbian former professional footballer who played as a midfielder.

== Career ==
In 1997–98 and 1998–99, Jovanović played for Hajduk Kula in the First League of FR Yugoslavia, collecting 12 appearances in the process.

After an unassuming spell at Slavia Mozyr in Belarus, Jovanović played for Mogren in the 2002–03 First League of Serbia and Montenegro, but failed to help them avoid relegation from the top flight. He subsequently joined Sartid Smederevo in June 2003, spending four seasons with the Oklopnici.

In 2007, Jovanović rejoined Mogren to play in the Montenegrin First League. He was a regular member of the team over the next four years, winning two championships in 2009 and 2011.

== Honours ==
Mogren

- Montenegrin First League: 2008–09, 2010–11
- Montenegrin Cup: 2007–08
