= 2007–08 Montenegrin Cup =

Tournament details
- Country: Montenegro
- Teams: 30

Final positions
- Champions: Mogren (1st title)
- Runners-up: Budućnost

Tournament statistics
- Matches played: 43
- Goals scored: 87 (2.02 per match)

The 2007–08 Montenegrin Cup was the second season of the Montenegrin knockout football tournament. The winner of the tournament received a berth in the first qualifying round of the 2008–09 UEFA Cup. The defending champions were Rudar, who beat Sutjeska in the final of the 2006–07 competition. The competition featured 30 teams. It started on 2 October 2007 and ended with the final on 7 May 2008.

== First round ==
The 14 matches were played on 2 and 3 October 2007.

Team 1	Score	Team 2
Ribnica	1–1 (5–6 p)	Bar
Grafičar	0–2	Budućnost
Mornar	0–1	Mladost
Pljevlja	0–5	Mogren
Zabjelo	0–0 (2–4 p)	Lovćen
Otrant	1–1 (5–3 p)	Jezero
Bokelj	1–1 (1–4 p)	Berane
Arsenal	0–0 (4–1 p)	Jedinstvo
Grbalj	4–0	Čelik
Zeta	3–1	Tekstilac
Ibar	1–0	Crvena Stijena
Petrovac	3–0	Gusinje
Dečić	3–0	Bratstvo
Prvijenac	0–3	Kom
Rudar	bye	
Sutjeska	bye	

== Second round ==
The first legs were played on 24 October and the second legs were played on 7 November 2007, with the exception of the second leg match between Sutjeska and Mogren, which was postponed until 28 November 2007.

Team 1	Agg.	Team 2	1st leg	2nd leg
Zeta	1–0	Mladost	1–0	0–0
Budućnost	6–0	Kom	3–0	3–0
Dečić	0–3	Rudar	0–1	0–2
Petrovac	(a) 3–3	Lovćen	2–0	1–3
Grbalj	9–0	Bar	7–0	2–0
Otrant	2–2 (2–3 p)	Arsenal	0–2	2–0
Berane	4–2	Ibar	1–0	3–2
Mogren	2–1	Sutjeska	1–1	1–0

== Quarter-finals ==
The first legs were played on 5 December and second on 12 December 2007.

Team 1	Agg.	Team 2	1st leg	2nd leg
Zeta	1–2	Budućnost	0–0	1–2
Rudar	2–0	Grbalj	0–0	2–0
Mogren	1–0	Petrovac	0–0	1–0
Berane	2–2 (4–3 p)	Arsenal	1–1	1–1

== Semi-finals ==
The first legs were played on 2 April and second on 16 April 2008.

=== Summary ===
Team 1	Agg.	Team 2	1st leg	2nd leg
Berane	0–4	Budućnost	0–0	0–4
Rudar	0–1	Mogren	0–0	0–1

=== First legs ===
2 April 2008	Berane	0–0	Budućnost	Berane
16:00 CEST				Stadium: Gradski stadion Attendance: 6,000; Referee: Željko Radunović

2 April 2008	Rudar	0–0	Mogren	Rožaje
16:00 CEST				Stadium: Stadion Bandžovo Brdo; Attendance: 3,000; Referee: Željko Mićović

=== Second legs ===
16 April 2008	Budućnost	4–0 (4–0 agg.)	Berane	Podgorica
16:00 CEST	Gustavo 10'; Milić 19'; Bećiraj 33'; Vukčević 37' (pen.)			Stadium: Podgorica City Stadium; Attendance: 4,000; Referee: Veljko Bošković

16 April 2008	Mogren	1–0 (1–0 agg.)	Rudar	Budva
16:00 CEST	Jovanović 80'			Stadium: Stadion Lugovi; Attendance: 2,000; Referee: Željko Mićović

== Final ==
7 May 2008
20:00 CEST

Budućnost	1–1 (a.e.t.)	Mogren
Vukčević 53'		Zec 84'
Penalties
Vukčević (penalty scored); N. Vuković (penalty scored); Đurišić (penalty scored); I. Vuković (penalty scored); Raičević (penalty scored); Bećiraj (penalty missed)	5–6	(penalty scored) Božović; (penalty scored) Nerić; (penalty scored) Pejović; (penalty scored) Radulović; (penalty scored) Gluščević; (penalty scored) Vujović

Podgorica City Stadium, Podgorica
Attendance: 10,000
Referee: Jovan Kaluđerović
