= 1953 Montenegrin Republic League =

Montenegrin Republic League
- Season: 1953
- Dates: March – June 1952
- Champions: Budućnost
- Matches: 56
- Goals: 256 (4.57 per match)

The 1953 Montenegrin Republic League was 8th season of Montenegrin Republic League. Season began in March 1953 and ended in June same year.

== Season ==
Locations of the 1953 Montenegrin Republic League teams

Just like in previous season, Yugoslav First League was the only league competition on Federal level. So, Montenegrin Republic League was once again second-tier competition. As there was no any Montenegrin representative in the First League, all the strongest sides played in Republic League.
Members of 1953 Montenegrin Republic League were Budućnost, Sutjeska, Lovćen, Radnički Ivangrad, Iskra, Bokelj, Arsenal and Mornar.

=== Qualifiers ===
While seven members placed directly, Mornar gained participation in 1953 season through qualifiers. Below are the results of qualifying rounds.
Round one: Gorštak - Breznik 3-0; Jedinstvo - Bokeška pobuna 3-0.
Semifinals: Jedinstvo - Mornar 2-4; Gorštak - Mladost 0-3.
Qualifier finals: Mladost - Mornar 1-1, 0-5.

=== Championship ===
During the eighth edition of Montenegrin Republic League, four teams struggled for the title - Budućnost, Lovćen, Radnički and Sutjeska. But, title race between Budućnost and Lovćen lasted until the final leg. With an away win against Arsenal (2-0), Budućnost gained the trophy which provided them another performance in the qualifiers for Yugoslav First League. From the other side, as a runner-up, Lovćen played in the qualifiers for Yugoslav Second League.
During the season, Budućnost made a record win in club's history - at an away game against Iskra (13-1). Another double count of goals on one game made Lovćen against Arsenal (11-0).
Season was also remembered by new editions of Montenegrin Derby with thousands of guest supporters on the stands of stadiums in Titograd and Nikšić.

==== Table ====
| Pos | Team | Pld | W | D | L | GF | GA | GD | Pts |
|---|---|---|---|---|---|---|---|---|---|
| 1 | Budućnost (C, Q) | 14 | 11 | 1 | 2 | 55 | 14 | +41 | 23 |
| 2 | Lovćen (Q) | 14 | 9 | 3 | 2 | 54 | 13 | +41 | 21 |
| 3 | Radnički Ivangrad | 14 | 9 | 1 | 4 | 39 | 19 | +20 | 19 |
| 4 | Sutjeska | 14 | 7 | 3 | 4 | 32 | 17 | +15 | 17 |
| 5 | Iskra | 14 | 4 | 2 | 8 | 20 | 58 | −38 | 10 |
| 6 | Bokelj | 14 | 2 | 5 | 7 | 18 | 37 | −19 | 9 |
| 7 | Arsenal | 14 | 4 | 1 | 9 | 26 | 48 | −22 | 9 |
| 8 | Mornar | 14 | 1 | 2 | 11 | 12 | 48 | −36 | 4 |

(C) Champions; (Q) Place in qualifiers for 1953-54 Yugoslav First League or Yugoslav Second League

==== Results ====
Budućnost finished season with two defeats. Most goals (14) was seen on the game Iskra - Budućnost (1-13).

| Home \ Away | BUD | LOV | RAD | SUT | ISK | BOK | ARS | MOR |
|---|---|---|---|---|---|---|---|---|
| BUD | | 1–0 | 4–1 | 1–2 | 3–2 | 5–0 | 6–2 | 6–0 |
| LOV | 3–2 | | 0–2 | 1–0 | 3–2 | 5–1 | 11–0 | 7–0 |
| RAD | 0–5 | 2–2 | | 1–0 | 6–0 | 5–0 | 3–0 | 6–1 |
| SUT | 1–2 | 2–2 | 2–1 | | 6–2 | 2–2 | 2–0 | 6–1 |
| ISK | 1–13 | 6–1 | 3–1 | 4–3 | | 3–0 | 2–2 | 1–0 |
| BOK | 1–4 | 0–0 | 0–4 | 0–0 | 0–0 | | 2–5 | 4–2 |
| ARS | 0–2 | 2–4 | 2–3 | 0–3 | 7–1 | 1–7 | | 3–1 |
| MOR | | | | | | | | |

Legend: Blue = home team win; Yellow = draw; Red = away team win.

=== Qualifiers for Yugoslav First League ===
In the qualifiers for First League, Budućnost played against champions of Republic Leagues of SR Serbia (Radnički Beograd and SR Macedonia (Rabotnički Skopje. After four games, Budućnost was a last-placed team with one point. So, Budućnost failed to make a comeback to Yugoslav First League, but they became a member of restored competition in Yugoslav Second League. Season 1953 was the last one which Budućnost spent in Montenegrin Republic League.

| Team 1 | Team 2 | Home | Away |
|---|---|---|---|
| Budućnost Titograd | Radnički Beograd | 1:2 | 1:3 |
| Rabotnički Skopje | Budućnost Titograd | 3:1 | 1:1 |

=== Qualifiers for Yugoslav Second League ===
In the qualifiers for Second League, Lovćen played against representatives of Republic Leagues of SR Serbia (Mačva Šabac and Napredak Kruševac) and SR Macedonia (Rabotnik Bitola. After six games, Lovćen finished as a second-placed team in the group, which meant promotion to Yugoslav Second League.

| Team 1 | Team 2 | Home | Away |
|---|---|---|---|
| Lovćen Cetinje | Napredak Kruševac | 1:0 | 1:1 |
| Lovćen Cetinje | Mačva Šabac | 0:2 | 0:2 |
| Rabotnik Bitola | Lovćen Cetinje | 2:3 | 0:2 |

== See also ==
- Montenegrin Republic League
- Montenegrin Republic Cup (1947–2006)
- Montenegrin clubs in Yugoslav football competitions (1946–2006)
- Montenegrin Football Championship (1922–1940)
