= 1946 Montenegrin Republic League =

Montenegrin Republic League
- Season: 1946
- Dates: April 1946 – May 1946
- Champions: Budućnost
- Matches: 12
- Goals: 74 (6.17 per match)

The 1946 Montenegrin Republic League was inaugural season of Montenegrin Republic League. First edition of competition was qualifying tournament for the first season of Yugoslav First League. Also, it was the very first official competition in Montenegro after the World War II. The season began in April and ended in May 1946.

== Season ==
Locations of the 1946 Montenegrin Republic League teams

During the first season, four teams played in competition. While Budućnost and Lovćen had a struggle for champions' title, Sutjeska and Arsenal had trying to avoid the last place.
Key games were matches between Budućnost and Lovćen. First match at Podgorica City Stadium won Budućnost (5-0), while second game in Cetinje was finished 2-2.
Finished as a champion of Montenegrin Republic League, Budućnost gained promotion to 1946–47 Yugoslav First League, while second-placed Lovćen played in qualifiers for the First League.

=== Table ===
Pos	Team	Pld	W	D	L	GF	GA	GD	Pts
1	Budućnost (C, P)	6	5	1	0	32	8	+24	11
2	Lovćen(Q)	6	4	1	1	22	9	+13	9
3	Sutjeska	6	1	0	5	11	24	−13	2
4	Arsenal	6	1	0	5	9	33	−24	2

(C) Champions; (P) Promoted to 1946–47 Yugoslav First League

=== Results ===
Budućnost finished season without any lost game, and with only one draw, against Lovćen in Cetinje.

Home \ Away	BUD	LOV	SUT	ARS
BUD		5–0	7–2	8–0
LOV	2–2		8–0	6–0
SUT	0–3	1–2		7–1
ARS	2–7	1–4	3–1	

Legend: Blue = home team win; Yellow = draw; Red = away team win.

=== Qualifiers for Yugoslav First League ===
While Budućnost was promoted to First Yugoslav League, Lovćen as a runner-up played in qualifiers for the top-tier. Team from Cetinje won their games in the first two legs, but failed in qualifiers' finals. Below are FK Lovćen results in the qualifiers.

Round	Opponent	Home	Away
Quarterfinals	OFD Makedonija Skopje	3:0	-
Semifinals	Borac Banja Luka	5:1	5:1
Final	Metalac Beograd	0:2	3:6

== See also ==
- Montenegrin Republic League
- Montenegrin Republic Cup (1947–2006)
- Montenegrin clubs in Yugoslav football competitions (1946–2006)
- Montenegrin Football Championship (1922–1940)
