= FK Budućnost Podgorica =

Montenegrin professional football club from Podgorica

Budućnost
- Full name: Fudbalski Klub Budućnost Podgorica
- Nickname: Plavo-bijeli (The Blue-Whites)
- Short name: BUD
- Founded: 12 June 1925; 101 years ago
- Ground: Stadion pod Goricom
- Capacity: 11,080
- Manager: Vacant
- League: Montenegrin First League
- 2025–26: Montenegrin First League, 5th of 10
- Website: fk-buducnost.me
Home colours	Away colours

Fudbalski Klub Budućnost Podgorica (Cyrillic: Будућност Подгорица, pronounced [budǔːt͡ɕnoːst], lit. 'Future') is a Montenegrin professional football club from Podgorica, Montenegro. Budućnost competes in the Montenegrin First League ever since 2006. The colours of Budućnost are blue and white.

Founded in 1925, Budućnost was the Montenegrin club with the most appearances in the Yugoslav First League, debuting in 1946. Due to the city being renamed during the communist rule in Yugoslavia, Budućnost was known as Budućnost Titograd throughout that era. Since Montenegrin independence in 2006, the club has won seven Montenegrin First League titles and three Montenegrin Cups. They are the Montenegrin club with the most games and seasons in European competitions, winning the UEFA Intertoto Cup in 1981.

The team has produced many top-class European players, some of them include the UEFA Champions League winning strikers Dejan Savićević and Predrag Mijatović. FK Budućnost is a part of Budućnost Podgorica sports society.

== History ==
=== The 1925–1941 period ===
The club was founded in June 1925, as a Workers' sports club Zora (RSK Zora). After two years, the club was renamed to RSK Budućnost. Historically, the first ever team of RSK Zora / RSK Budućnost, between 1925 and 1928, played Musaja Čelebičić, Vaso Vukadinović, Bećo Abdomerović, Vaso Čarapić, Vlado Kirsanov, Đorđe Kešeljević, Vaso Kulić, Blažo Prelević, Duljo Džaferadžović, Blažo Šutulović, Buto Krkanović, Luka Bulatović, Tahir Čelebić, Ilija Ivanović, Milo Pajović, Milovan Radulović, Vuko Vuksanović, Dušan Krcunović, Đorđije Vučeljić, Branko Rajković, Smail Bibezić, Šećir Kapadžić and Arso Marković. The first coach was Slovenian-born Karlo Vugrinec, who served in Podgorica as an electrician.

The first game in the history of FK Budućnost was a friendly match against local rival GSK Balšić, played in 1925. Budućnost won the game, with a result of 2–1.

In the late 1920s, RSK Budućnost played their first games in official competitions. Their debut in the Montenegrin football championship occurred in the 1927 season under the name Zora, when they were eliminated in the first stage of competition against GSK Balšić (0–3). Next season, Budućnost made their first win in official competitions, defeating GSK Balšić (2–1), but were eliminated in Championship semifinals against Lovćen (2–3).

In the next two years, Budućnost was eliminated in the early stages of Montenegrin Championship, and in spring 1931, for the second time in history, played in the semifinals. After elimination of GSK Balšić (4–1) and Berane (3–0), the team from Podgorica lost the semifinals against Obilić Nikšić (3–5).

In autumn 1931, Budućnost played in the finals of the Montenegrin football championship for the first time, but lost against SK Crnogorac Cetinje (1–2). In the previous stages of the competition, Budućnost eliminated GSK Balšić (6–2) and Gorštak Kolašin (3–1).

The Podgorica side played their first international game in 1932. Budućnost was hosted by KS Vllaznia in Shkoder and won 1–0.

In autumn 1932, Budućnost won their first title of Montenegrin champion. In the finals, the team from Podgorica defeated FK Lovćen (6–3). During that season, FK Budućnost played their first official game against FK Sutjeska (2–1), which was the first edition of Montenegrin Derby—the greatest rivalry in the history of Montenegrin football. In the spring of 1933, Budućnost defended their trophy. Their opponent in the final game was once again, FK Lovćen (2–0; 2–2). FK Budućnost won their third Montenegrin championship in 1934. Their opponent in the finals, was FK Lovćen (2–0, 1–1). The last time Budućnost played in a Championship final was in 1935; in that year FK Lovćen won the title (1–2).

In the beginning of 1937, as a team which supported workers' ideas, together with FK Lovćen, FK Budućnost was abandoned by the regime of that time. During the next years, the club, under the temporary name RSK Crna Gora, only played a few friendly, illegal games, against Lovćen and FK Velež from Mostar.

With the beginning of World War II, all sports' activities of the club were suspended. All the players joined the Partisan movement and 19 died during the battles. Outside of Podgorica City Stadium (Western stand), there is a memorial tablet commemorating all FK Budućnost players who died or participated in the war.

=== The 1945–1975 period ===
After the war, the club was refounded under the name FK Budućnost. Their first game was played on 1 May 1945, against FK Lovćen at Cetinje (4–2). In January 1946, Budućnost played its first international friendly game after the war against KF Tirana (6–1) in Podgorica. Soon after that, the team from Podgorica won the first official football competition after World War II in the Montenegrin Republic League for the 1946 season, which meant they were placed in the inaugural season of the Yugoslav First League (1946–47). During the six matches, Budućnost did not have a single defeat and made one of the biggest official victories in the team's history against Arsenal (8–0).

In their first game in the First Yugoslav League, FK Budućnost played on 25 August 1946 against Dinamo Zagreb (2–2), in front of 5,000 spectators in Podgorica, which was equal with the town population of that time. On 16 March 1947, Budućnost defeated NK Nafta 9–0. Until today, it remains the biggest home victory of Budućnost in the First League.

Until 1955, FK Budućnost played three seasons in the Yugoslav First League, four in the Yugoslav Second League and three in the Montenegrin Republic League. During this entire period, their head coach was Vojin Božović, who still holds two records in the club's history, Manager with most seasons (10) and with the most official games (199). In the season 1953, FK Budućnost made the biggest victory in their official games history, against Iskra away (13–1).

From 1955 to 1960, the team from Podgorica was a permanent participant of the Yugoslav First League. Their best performance of that era occurred in the 1956–57 and 1958–59, finishing as a ninth-placed team.

The most important moment in the next decade occurred in the season of 1964–65. Budućnost was a member of the Yugoslav Second League, but they surprisingly participated in the final game of 1964–65 Yugoslav Cup. They lost a game against Dinamo Zagreb (1–2). In their first Cup final, Budućnost played with following team: Hajduković, Folić, Gardašević, Pavlović, Savković, Kovačević, Šaković, Todorović, Šorban, Ćerić, Franović (coach: Božidar Dedović). The only goal for Budućnost scored Franović in the 35th minute. In previous rounds, FK Budućnost eliminated Sutjeska (3–2), Radnički Beograd (1–0), OFK Beograd (3–2) and Vardar away (2–0) in semifinals.

On the other side, during the 1960s, FK Budućnost spent only one season in the top tier (1962–63).

From 1969 to 1974, FK Budućnost was one of the best teams in the Yugoslav Second League sides, as they were title holders three times and twice runners-up. But, in all five seasons, they failed to gain a promotion to Yugoslav First League via playoffs. Rows of playoff losses started in 1969 against Sloboda Tuzla (0–3, 1–1), and continued in 1970 against Sloga Kraljevo (2–0, 0–2; lost on penalties), 1971 against Vardar Skopje (1–1, 0–3), 1972 against Spartak Subotica (1–0, 1–2; lost on penalties) and in 1973 against Maribor (1–0, 0–1; lost on penalties).

Finally, in the season of 1974–75, Budućnost gained their first promotion to top flight after 12 years. They won the Second League title with 14 points more than second-place Sutjeska and prepared for their comeback to the Yugoslav First League.

=== The 1975-1992 period ===
The 1975–1985 period was known as the golden age of football in Podgorica. Budućnost was a permanent top-tier member, finishing two seasons as six-placed team.

A big comeback of FK Budućnost to the Yugoslav First League occurred in the 1975–76 season. Budućnost avoided a relegation and during the season a few attendance records were made. The third game-week between Budućnost and Hajduk Split (1–2) was attended by 20,000 spectators, which is the highest number in the history of Budućnost home games, it is also the highest attendance for a game played in the Podgorica City Stadium too. On average 1975–76 First League games in Podgorica averaged 12,765 supporters, which is also an all-time record.

In the 1976–77 season, FK Budućnost had another notable performance in the Yugoslav Cup final. Their rival was Hajduk Split and the team from Podgorica lost the final. This time, they were defeated in extra-time (0–2). In the final, Budućnost lined-up with the following team: Vujačić, Janković, Folić, J. Miročević, Vukčević, Milošević, Kovačević, Bošković, Radonjić, A. Miročević, Ljumović (coach: Marko Valok). In previous rounds, Budućnost eliminated Pobeda Prilep (3–1), Rudar Kakanj (1–0), Sarajevo (3–2) and Radnički Niš in the semifinals (1–1; Budućnost won the penalties). The two appearances in the Yugoslav Cup finals (1965, 1977) are considered as the greatest achievements of FK Budućnost in the era of SFR Yugoslavia.

At the same time, in spring 1977, Budućnost debuted in the Balkans Cup, finishing second in their group with Panathinaikos (1–2, 2–2) and Vllaznia (2–0, 1–1).

During the seasons 1978–79 and 1980–81 Budućnost were remembered with them having the best performance in the Yugoslav First League. Both times, the team from Podgorica finished in sixth place. In season 1978–79, no one from the big four of Yugoslav football (Hajduk, FK Crvena Zvezda, GNK Dinamo and FK Partizan) won a game in Podgorica.

With sixth place in 1981, FK Budućnost qualified for the Intertoto Cup. They had a successful campaign in the Intertoto Cup, finishing among nine group winners. In Group 4, Budućnost played against Odense (4–2, 1–1), Östers (3–1, 0–0) and Wacker Innsbruck (1–2, 3–1).

In the middle of the Yugoslav First League 1981–82 season, all-time top-striker of FK Budućnost Mojaš Radonjić was transferred to AEK Athens. Radonjić has played for Budućnost ever since 1972, with overall 84 scored goals, and among them 52 in the Yugoslav First League.

During the 80s, Budućnost were never relegated from the First League, on the other side Budućnost were producing great players. In 1983 FK Budućnost debuted Dejan Savićević, who would later on win two UEFA Champions League titles, with one scored goal in the final. Savićević played for Budućnost from 1983 to 1988, including 130 games in the Yugoslav First League with 36 goals scored. For most matches in his career, Savićević played for Budućnost.

Another great talent of FK Budućnost, Predrag Mijatović, debuted in 1987 and would later win and score a goal in one UEFA Champions League final. Mijatović played two seasons with Budućnosts senior team, with 73 appearances and 10 goals scored.

Other players who started their careers in FK Budućnost during the 80s include Branko Brnović (100 games / 13 goals for Budućnost in First League), Željko Petrović (59/6), Niša Saveljić (98/8), Dragoljub Brnović (183/12) and Dragoje Leković (133/0); they were all members of national teams SFR Yugoslavia and FR Yugoslavia.

In the period between 1985 and 1991, FK Budućnost continued to play in Yugoslav First League. Their best finish at that time occurred in season 1986–87 where the team from Podgorica finished seventh, with the same amount of points as Dinamo Zagreb, and were only one point away from fourth-placed Rijeka.

The 80s were also remembered for the founding of the Budućnost Ultra group, Varvari (Barbarians) which was founded in 1987. It was the strongest organised supporters group in Montenegro and among the well-known in former Yugoslav territories.

On 28 May 1989, FK Budućnost played their first game under the newly built floodlights in Podgorica City Stadium, against Rad (3–0).

FK Budućnost made their third international performance in 1991. They represented Yugoslavia in the Balkans Cup. It was a very successful campaign for Budućnost, who played in the final. In the quarterfinals, they eliminated KF Tirana (2–0, 0–0). Later on Budućnost made a huge surprise in the semifinals, eliminating Galatasaray (0–0, 1–1). In the final, FK Budućnost lost to FC Inter Sibiu (0–0, 0–1). From 1946 to 1992, FK Budućnost played 26 seasons in Yugoslav First League. With 261 wins and 188 draws in 789 games, Budućnost is among the top 14 teams on the all-time list of the Yugoslav football championship.

=== Period 1992–2006 ===
After the breakup of Yugoslavia, Montenegro stayed in the federation with Serbia, in the successor state called FR Yugoslavia. So, FK Budućnost became a member of the new top-tier competition, the FR Yugoslavia First League.

Until the end of the 1990s, the First League had two groups (A and B). Budućnost played the majority of the seasons in the higher group.

FK Budućnost had its first success in the new football league in 1994–95. They finished as the champions of the B League and gained participation in international competitions. In the playoffs for UEFA competitions, Budućnost played against Vojvodina; the winner took the spot in the UEFA Cup while the losers took place in the UEFA Intertoto Cup. While FK Budućnost won the first game in Podgorica (3–1), Vojvodina won 5–2 in Novi Sad, so Budućnost played in the 1995 UEFA Intertoto Cup. They finished fourth in Group 7, so they did not qualify for further stages. FK Budućnost won an away game against Tervis Pärnu (3–1), but were defeated by Bayer in Leverkusen. As Podgorica City Stadium did not meet new UEFA rules, they played home games against Nea Salamis (1–1) and OFI (3–4) in Belgrade.

At the beginning of 2000, FK Budućnost performances got weaker, as a result they were relegated after season 2000–01. Budućnost lost the battle against Rad, so they were relegated to the Second League after 26 consecutive seasons spent in the top-tier.

Another surprise came during the following two seasons, when FK Budućnost failed to gain a quick promotion to First League. Finally, promotion came during the 2003–04 Second League, when FK Budućnost with a young, homegrown team, dominated in the competition.

Budućnost made a great top-tier comeback in season 2004–05. With many significant results. Budućnost defeated Crvena Zvezda in Belgrade (2–1) for the first time after 18 years. At the end of the season, Budućnost finished sixth and gained a place in the UEFA Intertoto Cup. In the first leg of 2005 UEFA Intertoto Cup, they eliminated Valletta (2–2, 5–0) and in the next stage their opponent were Spanish giants Deportivo La Coruña. The first game at Estadio Riazor finished 3–0 for the home side. In the second match, FK Budućnost held a 2–0 lead in front of 10,000 supporters, however the end, Deportivo scored to make it 2–1 and went on to the next stage.

=== Period 2006–present ===
As the Montenegrin club with the best results during the period 1945–2006, Budućnost continued with even greater successes in the Montenegrin First League (Prva CFL), after Montenegrin independence (2006).

On the 2006–07 season of Prva CFL, the team from Podgorica competed with FK Zeta in the title race. The fight for the trophy lasted until the end of season, where Zeta won the title. A spring game between Budućnost and Zeta in Podgorica (1–0) was attended by 10,000 supporters, which is the biggest attendance in the history of Prva CFL.

In the 2007–08 season, Budućnost played in the UEFA Cup against HNK Hajduk. The first game was played in front of 10,000 spectators in Podgorica, which finished 1–1, and the Croatian team won the second match (1–0). In the 2007–08 season, Budućnost won their first league title in the clubs history. They finished the season with equal number of points as FK Zeta and FK Mogren, but with better head-to-head score against the other teams Budućnost finished first. In the 2007–08 season, the team from Podgorica made an impressive row of 21 games without defeat. During the same season, Budućnost almost won the double, but in the final of the 2007–08 Montenegrin Cup, they were defeated after the penalties against FK Mogren (1–1 / 5–6). As the Montenegrin champion, for the first time in history, Budućnost played in UEFA Champions League qualifiers. But, their debut was not successful, as Budućnost was eliminated by Tampere United (1–1; 1–2).

From 2008 to 2011, Budućnost finished every single season in Prva CFL as a runner-up, while they had another performance in the Cup finals on the 2009–10 season. Once again, they missed opportunity to win the trophy, and this time Budućnost was defeated by FK Rudar (1–2). During that period, Budućnost played another three seasons in the UEFA Europa League and the most successful run was their performance from the 2010–11 season, where they played in the third qualifying round, but they were defeated by Brøndby (1–2; 0–1).

Next success Budućnost made was on the 2011–12 season, when Budućnost became the winner of the Montenegrin First League. That was their second league title for Budućnost. During all season, they were in a hard struggle for title with FK Rudar. At the end, Podgorica's side won the title with three points higher than Rudar. With 80 points from 33 games, 82 scored goals and 25 victories, Budućnost made a new all-time record for the most points for a single Prva CFL season. The Podgorica side was close to the third qualifying round of 2012–13 UEFA Champions League, but they did not succeed, despite their away win against Śląsk Wrocław (0–2; 1–0).

A year later, the team from Podgorica won the first Cup trophy in the history. In the final of the 2012–13 Montenegrin Cup, Budućnost defeated FK Čelik 1–0. A game with lot of violence at Podgorica City Stadium was solved in the last minute, as Mitar Peković scored a goal for the trophy. That was their fifth final appearance in domestic cup finals and their first win. As the Cup winners, Budućnost played in the 2014–15 UEFA Europa League. During first round, they eliminated Folgore (3–0; 2–1), but their campaign ended against Omonia (0–2; 0–0).

During the next three seasons, Budućnost had some unsuccessful runs for the trophy. But, in European competitions, they almost made a big success in 2016–17 UEFA Europa League. In first leg, Budućnost eliminated Rabotnički (1–0; 1–1). On next stage, their rival was Genk. First match, played in Belgium, finished with 2–0 hosts victory. Next week in Podgorica, Budućnost won 2–0. But, the Belgian side qualified for the next round after a penalty shootout (2–4). The game against Genk in Podgorica was remembered as one of the best European performances of Budućnost of the decade. On the 2016–17 season the team from the capital won their third league title. After a hard struggle with FK Zeta and OFK Titograd, Budućnost finished first thanks to better results against their direct opponents. All three teams earned 57 points during the season.

In the 2017–18 UEFA Champions League, Budućnost played against Partizan. Budućnost were eliminated after a defeat in Belgrade (0–0; 0–2). The next trophy, Budućnost won was the Montenegrin Cup 2018–19. Led by Branko Brnović, Budućnost defeated FK Lovćen 4–0 in the final. Except that, striker Mihailo Perović became the very first player who scored a hat-trick in a Montenegrin Cup final. During the summer 2019, after two years without success, Budućnost finally passed the first stage in European competitions. In Europa League, they eliminated Narva Trans (4–1; 2–0), but were stopped in second leg against Zorya Luhansk from Ukraine (1–3; 0–1).

The fourth title Budućnost won was the 2019–20 Montenegrin First League. During the season, head coach Brnović was sacked, who was replaced by Mladen Milinković, after the domination, the team from Podgorica secured the title six weeks before the end of season. However, bad news came after the 31st round of the Montenegrin First League, as a few Budućnost players were infected with COVID-19. Because of that, the championship was interrupted.

The 2020–21 season with Mladen Milinković as head coach was historical for Budućnost in many ways. During the summer, they made significant results in the 2020–21 UEFA Europa League, after a victory in the second qualifying round against FC Astana away (1–0). However Budućnost failed to qualify for the playoffs, after a defeat against FK Sarajevo (1–2). During the rest of the season, for the first time in the clubs history, Budućnost won the double. During the 2020–21 Montenegrin First League, Budućnost finished first with many all-time Montenegrin records with the records being the biggest number of earned points (85), the highest number of wins (27) and the longest unbeaten run (23 games). They equalised their record of 10 consecutive victories from the championship from the season 2011–12. That was the first time when Budućnost defended the national title. On the other side, with a 3–1 victory in the final against Dečić, Budućnost won another trophy, the 2020–21 Montenegrin Cup.

=== Evolution of name ===
FK Budućnost has played under three different names.

Period	Name	Full name
1925–1928	RSK Zora	Radnički sportski klub "Zora" / Workers' Sport Club "Zora"
1928–1937	RSK Budućnost	Radnički sportski klub "Budućnost" / Workers' Sport Club "Budućnost"
1937–1941	RSK Crna Gora	Radnički sportski klub "Crna Gora" / Workers' Sport Club "Montenegro"
1945–	FK Budućnost	Fudbalski klub "Budućnost" / Football Club "Budućnost"

=== List of competitive matches (1925–) ===
Below is an overall score of all matches of FK Budućnost in official competitions since 1925. More details at page List of FK Budućnost seasons.

Competition Level	Seasons	First season	Last season	Matches	W	D	L	GD
First League	52	1946-47	2020-21	1654	683	386	585	2120:2017
Second League	21	1947-48	2003-04	620	331	146	143	1021:532
Republic League	3	1946	1953	28	23	2	3	113:29
First League playoffs	10	1951-52	1996-97	28	10	6	12	37:44
Montenegrin Championship (1922–1940)	12	1927	1935	37	25	4	8	94:42
National Cup	59	1947	2020-21	192	104	34	54	309:205
UEFA competitions	15	1981-82	2019-20	46	16	11	19	59:59
Balkans Cup	2	1977	1990-91	10	2	6	2	9:8
OVERALL (1925-)				2605	1194	595	826	3762:2936

Note: Including 2019–20 UEFA Europa League, 2020–21 Montenegrin First League and 2020-21 Montenegrin Cup results

=== Records ===
- Biggest home victory: Budućnost – Rabotnički 10:0 (16 May 1948, Yugoslav Second League)
- Biggest home defeat: Budućnost – Hajduk Split 0:5 (15 December 1946, Yugoslav First League)
- Biggest away victory: Iskra Danilovgrad – Budućnost 1:13 (10 May 1953, Montenegrin Republic League)
- Biggest away defeat: Partizan – Budućnost 10:0 (29 October 1950, Yugoslav First League)
- Biggest First league victory: Budućnost – Nafta 9:0 (16 March 1947, Yugoslav First League)
- Biggest European victory: (Malta) Valletta – Budućnost 0:5 (18 June 2005)
- Biggest European defeat: Budućnost – (Finland) HJK Helsinki 0:4 (13 July 2021), (Faroe Islands) HB – Budućnost 4:0 (22 July 2021)
- Biggest home attendance: 20,000, Budućnost – Hajduk Split (27 August 1975, Yugoslav First League)
- Biggest away attendance: 60,000, Dinamo Zagreb – Budućnost (2 May 1982, Yugoslav First League)

== Budućnost in European competitions ==
FK Budućnost is the Montenegrin club with most played seasons and matches in European football competitions. Except for participation in UEFA competitions, Budućnost played twice in the Balkans Cup.

=== UEFA competitions ===
FK Budućnost debuted in European competitions in 1981, when they played in Intertoto Cup, finishing first in their group. In the following decades, Budućnost played in the same competition twice, with a notable victory against Deportivo La Coruña (2:1) in 2006.

After Montenegrin independence, Budućnost became regular participants in UEFA competitions, and played seven seasons in the Champions League qualifiers. More recently, Budućnost's most successful European season was the 2016/17 in UEFA Europa League. After eliminating the Macedonian side Rabotnički, Budućnost almost won against K.R.C. Genk (2:0 in Podgorica after 0:2 in Genk in first match), but lost on penalties.

Competition	Seasons	First	Last	Pld	W	D	L	GF	GA	GD
UEFA Champions League	7	2008–09	2025–26	13	2	3	8	10	25	-15
UEFA Europa League	10	2007–08	2020–21	28	10	5	13	30	32	–2
Intertoto Cup	3	1981–82	2005–06	14	6	4	4	28	22	4
UEFA Europa Conference League	5	2021–22	2025–26	14	3	3	8	14	21	–7
OVERALL	17 seasons			69	21	15	39	80	100	–20

=== Balkans Cup ===
FK Budućnost played two seasons in the Balkans Cup, a regional competition for clubs from Yugoslavia, Albania, Bulgaria, Greece, Romania and Turkey. The club made their debut in 1977 in Group B, with Panathinaikos and Vllaznia. After four legs, they finished second in their group with four points. During their second campaign in the Balkans Cup, in 1991, Budućnost reached the final losing to FC Inter Sibiu. Before the final game, Budućnost eliminated Galatasaray.

== Honours ==
National Championships – 7

- Meridianbet 1. CFL:
  - Winners (7): 2007–08, 2011–12, 2016–17, 2019–20, 2020–21, 2022–23, 2024–25
  - Runners-up (9): 2006–07, 2008–09, 2009–10, 2010–11, 2012–13, 2015–16, 2017–18, 2018–19, 2021–22

National Cups – 5

- Montenegrin Cup:
  - Winners (5): 2012–13, 2018–19, 2020–21, 2021–22, 2023–24
  - Runners-up (3): 2007–08, 2009–10, 2015–16
- Yugoslav Cup:
  - Runners-up (2): 1964–65, 1976–77

Championships (1922–1940) – 4

- Montenegrin Championship (1922–1940)
  - Winners (4): 1932, spring 1933, autumn 1933, 1934
  - Runners-up (2): 1931, 1935

International – 1

- Intertoto Cup
  - Group winners (1): 1981
- Balkans Cup:
  - Runners-up (1): 1990–91

== Supporters and rivalries ==
=== Varvari ===
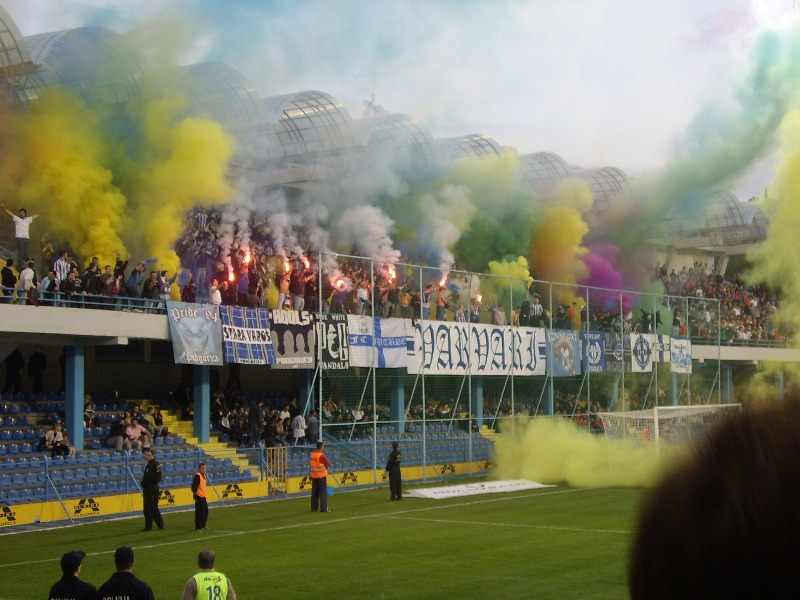
Varvari at a Montenegrin First League home match

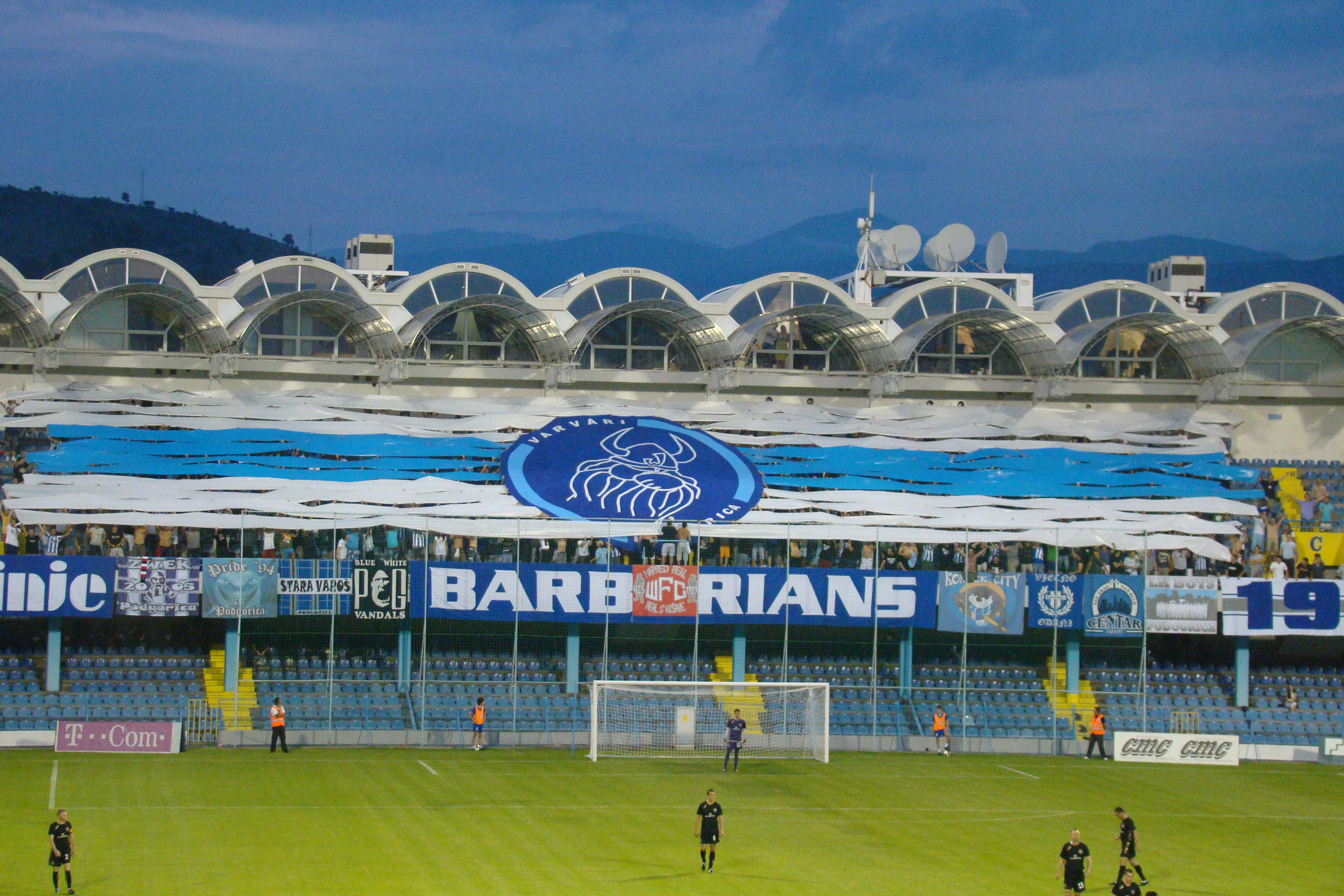
Varvari at a Montenegrin First League home match

Budućnost fans are known as Varvari (Barbarians), a group founded in 1987. The group's traditional colours are blue and white, which are also the colours of all the Budućnost sports clubs. For FK Budućnost Podgorica home games, Varvari occupy the northern stand (Sjever) of the Podgorica city stadium. They also have a reserved stand at the Morača Sports Center, as supporters of KK Budućnost. The focal point for the group during the late 1990s was the basketball club, which started investing heavily while the football club toiled in the lower half of the table.

Since its foundation years, Varvari gained a reputation as a violent group, and in recent history they caused some of the biggest accidents that occurred at football matches. At a First League 2004–05 against Partizan Belgrade, flares, blocks, construction materials and similar objects were thrown from the North stand to the pitch and the match was abandoned for 15 minutes. The following year, the home game against Red Star Belgrade was suspended for two hours after home supporters (Varvari) sprayed tear gas on the pitch and, after that, attacked visitors' ultras. In spring 2006, there was crowd violence at the local rivals game against Zeta. In the Montenegrin First League, numerous matches of FK Budućnost were suspended due to crowd violence or crowd invasion of the pitch. During the latest seasons, there has been an escalation of violence at the Montenegrin Derby games.

They have the largest organised fan group in Montenegro. According to many fan magazines from the Balkans they are the only fans in Montenegro who are at the level of the largest ex-Yugoslavian fan groups.

=== Rivalries ===
FK Budućnost share the biggest rivalry in Montenegrin football, the Montenegrin Derby, a match against FK Sutjeska from Nikšić. The first official game was played 9 October 1932. As a match of main and strongest clubs from the two biggest Montenegrin cities, The Derby became popular from its earliest days. Some of the highest attendance in Montenegrin football were recorded at the games of the Montenegrin Derby. Since the 80s, both clubs have organised groups of supporters, which gave the Montenegrin Derby a new and often violent dimension.

Montenegrin Derby all-time record
Competition	Played	Budućnost	Draw	Sutjeska	GD
First League	83	40	30	18	135:88
Montenegrin Championship	4	4	0	0	15:3
Lower leagues	26	12	6	8	43:29
National Cup	11	8	3	0	19:7
Totals	124	64	39	26	212:133

Except for the Montenegrin Derby, during the 1925–1935 period, there was a big local derby in Podgorica between FK Budućnost and GSK Balšić. As Budućnost was officially a workers' club and Balšić the team of that-time regime, the Podgorica derby had a big social dimension. Together with the Cetinje teams Lovćen and Crnogorac, the rivals from Podgorica were among the top four teams in Montenegrin Football Championship (1922–1940). So, their games made huge interest in Podgorica and nearby places. The two teams played their first game against each other at 1925 and Budućnost won 2–1 (friendly game).

During the regime of the Kingdom of Yugoslavia, the work of RSK Budućnost was prohibited at 1937. After the Second World War, GSK Balšić was not refounded, so derby was alive only in the period from 1925 to 1936. Budućnost won four champion titles in the 1925–1935 period, while GSK Balšić won seven trophies in the seasons between 1925 and 1940. Budućnost and Balšić played 11 official games. Budućnost won 8 matches and Balšić won 3 games, with a goal difference 22–12 (Budućnost goals first).

During the 1946–2006 period, especially popular games of FK Budućnost were against the big four of Yugoslav football (Crvena zvezda, Dinamo Zagreb, Hajduk Split and Partizan). Games against Hajduk and Dinamo were played in the Yugoslav First League until the breakup of SFR Yugoslavia, and games against Crvena zvezda and Partizan were played until Montenegrin independence.

== Stadium and training facility ==
=== Podgorica City Stadium ===
FK Budućnost plays its home games at the Stadion Pod Goricom, in Podgorica. Stadion Pod Goricom, is also the largest football stadium in Montenegro and the home ground of the Montenegro national football team. The stadium's original capacity was about 12,000 spectators, which expanded to 15,230 with the addition of the north and south stands. An eastern stand is planned to be built soon, which will bring the stadium's capacity to over 20,000.

The pitch measures 105 x 70 meters. Stadium is well known for close distance between pitch and stands. Pitch was totally renovated in 2014 and it is among the best football pitches in the Balkans today.

Floodlights were installed in 1989, and the first match during the night-time was Budućnost – Rad (First League, 28 May 1989). Twenty years later, new, 1900 lux, floodlights were installed.

=== FK Budućnost training center ===
Since 2008, FK Budućnost made their own training center in Camp FSCG, located on Ćemovsko polje, a plain on the Podgorica outskirts between the settlements Stari Aerodrom and Konik.

At their training center, an area of 18,000 sq meters, FK Budućnost owns an administrative building with offices, meeting rooms, press room and technical facilities, and two football grounds. Both pitches have stands with capacity of 1,000 seats. On these home grounds, all young teams of FK Budućnost and ŽFK Budućnost also play.

In November 2016, the senior team of FK Budućnost played an official game at the training centre for the first time. In the Montenegrin Cup match, they hosted FK Kom.

== Current team ==
=== Squad ===
As of 15 February 2026.

Note: Flags indicate national team as defined under FIFA eligibility rules; some limited exceptions apply. Players may hold more than one non-FIFA nationality.

No.	Pos.	Nation	Player
1	GK	MNE	Milan Mijatović
3	DF	SRB	Stefan Hajdin
4	DF	MNE	Miomir Đuričković
5	DF	RUS	Ilya Serikov
7	MF	MNE	Igor Ivanović
8	MF	MNE	Nikola Medojević
9	FW	SRB	Nemanja Nikolić
10	MF	MNE	Marko Milićković
11	FW	MNE	Ivan Bulatović
14	MF	MNE	Matija Rakčević
15	DF	MNE	Miloš Milović
17	FW	MNE	Milan Vušurović
18	FW	MNE	Petar Grbić
20	DF	MNE	Momčilo Raspopović
21	GK	MNE	Filip Domazetović

No.	Pos.	Nation	Player
22	MF	MNE	Lazar Savović
24	MF	MNE	Andrej Camaj
25	FW	MNE	Zoran Petrović
29	MF	MNE	Vasilije Terzić
30	FW	MNE	Nikola Janjić
31	GK	MNE	Ljubomir Đurović
32	DF	MNE	Andrej Pupović
35	DF	MNE	Damjan Dakić
40	MF	MNE	Srđan Krstović
44	MF	MNE	Danilo Vukanić
55	DF	MNE	Adnan Orahovac
70	DF	MNE	Miloš Drinčić
77	FW	MNE	Ivan Bojović
92	FW	SRB	Mihajlo Nešković (on loan from Sepsi OSK)

=== Out on loan ===
Note: Flags indicate national team as defined under FIFA eligibility rules; some limited exceptions apply. Players may hold more than one non-FIFA nationality.

No.	Pos.	Nation	Player
34	MF	MNE	Stefan Đukanović (at (Slovakia) DAC Dunajská Streda B until 30 June 2026)
—	MF	MNE	Matija Jovanović (at Iskra until 30 June 2026)

No.	Pos.	Nation	Player
—	MF	MNE	Stefan Radojević (at Jedinstvo BP until 30 June 2026)
—	FW	MNE	Marko Šćepanović (at Iskra until 30 June 2026)

=== Coaching staff ===
Position	Staff
Manager	Dejan Vukičević
Assistant manager	Srđan Nikić
Assistant manager	Mihailo Tomković
Goalkeeping coach	Veljko Bajković
Physiotherapist	Damir Zejnilovic
Physiotherapist	Zoran Jovovic
Economic	Zoran Gajević

Last updated: 8 September 2025

== Coaching and players history ==
=== Records ===
- Most performances: (Socialist Federal Republic of Yugoslavia) Slavko Vlahović – 413/1 (1977–1991)
- Most performances in First League: (Socialist Federal Republic of Yugoslavia) Slavko Vlahović – 392 (1977–1991)
- Top goalscorer: (Socialist Federal Republic of Yugoslavia) Mojaš Radonjić – 84 (1972–1982)
- Top goalscorer in First League: (Socialist Federal Republic of Yugoslavia) Mojaš Radonjić – 52 (1975–1982)
- Head coach with most seasons: (Socialist Federal Republic of Yugoslavia) Vojin Božović – 199 games (1945–1955)

=== Notable players ===
See Category:FK Budućnost Podgorica players.

During its history, many notable players started their career or played for FK Budućnost. Most notable are Podgorica-born players Dejan Savićević, Predrag Mijatović, Branko Brnović, Željko Petrović, Niša Saveljić and Dragoljub Brnović. Players with the most games for Budućnost are Ibrahim Methadžović and Slavko Vlahović. Most goals for FK Budućnost scored in the First League was by Mojaš Radonjić.

Below is the list of former Budućnost players who represented their countries at the full international level.

- (Socialist Federal Republic of Yugoslavia) Zoran Batrović
- (Socialist Federal Republic of Yugoslavia) Vojin Božović
- (Socialist Federal Republic of Yugoslavia) Nikola Jovanović
- (Socialist Federal Republic of Yugoslavia) Živan Ljukovčan
- (Socialist Federal Republic of Yugoslavia) Ante Miročević
- (Socialist Federal Republic of Yugoslavia) Milutin Pajević
- (Socialist Federal Republic of Yugoslavia) Saša Petrović
- (Socialist Federal Republic of Yugoslavia) Lazar Radović
- (Socialist Federal Republic of Yugoslavia) Nikola Radović
- (Socialist Federal Republic of Yugoslavia) Branko Rašović
- (Socialist Federal Republic of Yugoslavia) Dragan Simeunović
- (Socialist Federal Republic of Yugoslavia) Ljubiša Spajić
- (Socialist Federal Republic of Yugoslavia) Miljan Zeković
- (Socialist Federal Republic of Yugoslavia) (Serbia and Montenegro) Branko Brnović
- (Socialist Federal Republic of Yugoslavia) (Serbia and Montenegro) Dragoljub Brnović
- (Socialist Federal Republic of Yugoslavia) (Serbia and Montenegro) Dragoje Leković
- (Socialist Federal Republic of Yugoslavia) (Serbia and Montenegro) Željko Petrović
- (Socialist Federal Republic of Yugoslavia) (Serbia and Montenegro) Dejan Savićević
- (Serbia and Montenegro) Zoran Banović
- (Serbia and Montenegro) Nenad Brnović
- (Serbia and Montenegro) Damir Čakar
- (Serbia and Montenegro) Anto Drobnjak
- (Serbia and Montenegro) Predrag Mijatović
- (Serbia and Montenegro) Niša Saveljić
- (Serbia and Montenegro) Goran Trobok
- (Serbia and Montenegro) (Montenegro) Igor Burzanović
- (Serbia and Montenegro) (Montenegro) Dejan Ognjanović
- (Montenegro) Vasilije Adžić
- (Montenegro) Fatos Bećiraj
- (Montenegro) Srđan Blažić
- (Montenegro) Draško Božović
- (Montenegro) Mladen Božović
- (Montenegro) Miloš Brnović
- (Montenegro) Driton Camaj
- (Montenegro) Đorđije Ćetković
- (Montenegro) Marko Ćetković
- (Montenegro) Ivan Delić
- (Montenegro) Petar Grbić
- (Montenegro) Radomir Đalović
- (Montenegro) Blažo Igumanović
- (Montenegro) Vasko Kalezić
- (Montenegro) Damir Kojašević
- (Montenegro) Miloš Krkotić
- (Montenegro) Risto Lakić
- (Montenegro) Milan Mijatović
- (Montenegro) Stefan Milošević
- (Montenegro) Stefan Mugoša
- (Montenegro) Nemanja Mijušković
- (Montenegro) Darko Nikač
- (Montenegro) Nikola Nikezić
- (Montenegro) Milan Purović
- (Montenegro) Srđan Radonjić
- (Montenegro) Risto Radunović
- (Montenegro) Momčilo Raspopović
- (Montenegro) Mirko Raičević
- (Montenegro) Marko Simić
- (Montenegro) Janko Simović
- (Montenegro) Goran Vujović
- (Montenegro) Milan Vukotić
- (Montenegro) Andrija Vukčević
- (Montenegro) Marko Vukčević
- (Albania) Dodë Tahiri
- (Albania) Zamir Shpuza
- (Belarus) Mikhail Markhel
- (Chad) Misdongarde Betolngar
- (North Macedonia) Viktor Trenevski

=== Historical list of coaches ===
- (Kingdom of Yugoslavia) Karlo Vugrinec (1925–28)
- (Kingdom of Yugoslavia) Duljo Vlak (1928–31)
- (Kingdom of Yugoslavia) Šefket Šabanadžović (1932–34)
- (Socialist Federal Republic of Yugoslavia) Vojin Božović (1945–55)
- (Socialist Federal Republic of Yugoslavia) Božidar Dedović (1964–66)
- (Socialist Federal Republic of Yugoslavia) Vasilije Darmanović (1966–67)
- (Socialist Federal Republic of Yugoslavia) Aleksandar Atanacković (1967–68)
- (Socialist Federal Republic of Yugoslavia) Gojko Zec (1968–1969)
- (Socialist Federal Republic of Yugoslavia) Munib Saračević (1969–1970)
- (Socialist Federal Republic of Yugoslavia) Špiro Popović (1970–1971)
- (Socialist Federal Republic of Yugoslavia) Dušan Nenković (1971–1973)
- (Socialist Federal Republic of Yugoslavia) Vasilije Darmanović (1973–1974)
- (Socialist Federal Republic of Yugoslavia) Dušan Varagić (1974–1976)
- (Socialist Federal Republic of Yugoslavia) Marko Valok (1976–1977)
- (Socialist Federal Republic of Yugoslavia) Dragoljub Milošević (1977)
- (Socialist Federal Republic of Yugoslavia) Milutin Folić (1977–1978)
- (Socialist Federal Republic of Yugoslavia) Gojko Zec (1978–1979)
- (Socialist Federal Republic of Yugoslavia) Dragutin Spasojević (1979–1981)
- (Socialist Federal Republic of Yugoslavia) Đorđe Gerum (1981–1982)
- (Socialist Federal Republic of Yugoslavia) Milutin Folić (1982 – March 1984)
- (Socialist Federal Republic of Yugoslavia) Petar Š. Ljumović (1984)
- (Socialist Federal Republic of Yugoslavia) Josip Duvančić (1984)
- (Socialist Federal Republic of Yugoslavia) Milutin Folić (1985)
- (Socialist Federal Republic of Yugoslavia) Dragutin Spasojević (1985 – March 1986)
- (Socialist Federal Republic of Yugoslavia) Srboljub Markušević (1986)
- (Socialist Federal Republic of Yugoslavia) Milan Živadinović (1986–1987)
- (Socialist Federal Republic of Yugoslavia) Stanko Poklepović (1987–1989)
- (Socialist Federal Republic of Yugoslavia) Mojaš Radonjić (June 1989 – June 1990)
- (Socialist Federal Republic of Yugoslavia) Gano Ćerić (1990 – February 1991)
- (Socialist Federal Republic of Yugoslavia) Josip Kuže (1991)
- (Socialist Federal Republic of Yugoslavia) Milovan Đorić (1991)
- (Socialist Federal Republic of Yugoslavia) Milan Živadinović (1991–92)
- (Serbia and Montenegro) Dimitrije Mitrović (1992–94)
- (Serbia and Montenegro) Slobodan Kustudić (1994)
- (Serbia and Montenegro) Dragan Šaković (1995)
- (Serbia and Montenegro) Dimitrije Mitrović (1995)
- (Serbia and Montenegro) Momčilo Vujačić (1996–97)
- (Serbia and Montenegro) Savo Rogošić (1997)
- (Serbia and Montenegro) Mojaš Radonjić (1997)
- (Serbia and Montenegro) Dimitrije Mitrović (1997–98)
- (Serbia and Montenegro) Petar C. Ljumović (1998–99)
- (Serbia and Montenegro) Dragan Okuka (1999–2000)
- (Serbia and Montenegro) Janko Miročević (2000)
- (Serbia and Montenegro) Božidar Vuković (2000)
- (Serbia and Montenegro) Dragan Šaković (2000)
- (Serbia and Montenegro) Miodrag Stanišić (2001)
- (Serbia and Montenegro) Nikola Rakojević (2001)
- (Serbia and Montenegro) Janko Miročević (2001–02)
- (Serbia and Montenegro) Mojaš Radonjić (Jul – Dec 2002)
- (Serbia and Montenegro) Srđan Bajić (Jan – Jun 2003)
- (Serbia and Montenegro) Branislav Milačić (Jul 2003– Mar 2006)
- (Serbia and Montenegro) Božidar Vuković (Mar 2006 - Jun 2006)
- (Montenegro) Miodrag Božović (Jul – Dec 2006)
- (Montenegro) Branislav Milačić (Jan – Apr 2007)
- (Montenegro) Božidar Vuković (5 Apr 2007 - Jun 2007)
- (Montenegro) Saša Petrović (Jun – Oct 2007)
- (Montenegro) Mojaš Radonjić (28 Oct 2007 - Nov 2007)
- (Serbia) Branko Babić (21 Nov 2007 – Sep 2008)
- (Serbia) Miodrag Ješić (3 Sep 2008 – May 2009)
- (Serbia) Mihailo Ivanović (Jun 2009 – Apr 2010)
- (Montenegro) Nenad Vukčević (2 Apr 2010 - Jun 2010)
- (Montenegro) Nikola Rakojević (Jun – Dec 2010)
- (Montenegro) Saša Petrović (15 Dec 2010 – Jul 2011)
- (Montenegro) Miodrag Radulović (Jul 2011 – Jun 2012)
- (Montenegro) Radislav Dragićević (Jun 2012 – Jul 2013)
- (Montenegro) Nenad Vukčević (Jul 2013 – Mar 2014)
- (Montenegro) Goran Perišić (2 Apr 2014 – Jul 2014)
- (Montenegro) Dragan Radojičić (30 Jul 2014 – Jun 2015)
- (Montenegro) Miodrag Vukotić (Jun 2015 – Jun 2017)
- (Montenegro) Dragan Kažić (Jun – Nov 2017)
- (Serbia) Vladimir Vermezović (Dec 2017 – May 2018)
- (Serbia) Zoran Govedarica (Jun – Sep 2018)
- (Montenegro) Branko Brnović (Oct 2018 – Oct 2019)
- (Serbia) Mladen Milinković (Nov 2019 – July 2021)
- (Montenegro) Aleksandar Nedović (Aug 2021 – Aug 2022)
- (Montenegro) Miodrag Džudović (Aug 2022 – July 2023)
- (Serbia) Mladen Milinković (July 2023 – )

== Sponsors ==
- Official sponsor – (2025–) SBbet
- Official kit supplier – (2025–) Macron

=== Kit suppliers ===
Period	Kit provider	Colors home	Colors away	Third kit
1976–1980	(Germany) Adidas	blue, white	white, blue	
1980–1985	(Socialist Federal Republic of Yugoslavia) Sport	blue, white	blue, white	
1985–1990	(Socialist Federal Republic of Yugoslavia) Yassa	blue, white	white, blue	
1990–1995	(Spain) Kelme	blue, white	red, white	
1995–1997	(Italy) Lotto	blue, white	white, blue	
1997–1998	(France) Le Coq Sportif	navy blue, white	white, blue	
1998–2000	(Serbia) NAAI	blue, white	white	
2000–2004	(Serbia) da Capo	red, sky blue, white	blue, white	white
2000–2004	(Serbia) da Capo	blue, white	white	
2004–2006	(Italy) A-line	blue, white	white	
2006–2009	(Serbia) da Capo	blue, white	white, blue	
2009–2011	(United States) Nike	blue, white	white, blue	white
2011–2020	(Italy) Legea	blue, white	white, blue	white
2011–2020	(Italy) Legea	blue, white	navy blue	orange
2011–2020	(Italy) Legea	blue, white	grey	red, white
2011–2020	(Italy) Legea	blue, white	grey	yellow
2011–2020	(Italy) Legea	blue, white	white, blue	white
2011–2020	(Italy) Legea	blue, white	dark red	white
2020–2025	(Germany) Adidas	blue, white	green	white
2025–	(Italy) Macron	blue, white	white	purple

== Women's team ==
The women's team of FK Budućnost (ŽFK Budućnost) was formed in 2005. Until 2016, the team was known as ŽFK Palma.

They play in the Montenegrin Women's League and it is the oldest women's football club in Montenegro. They have won three league titles in seasons 2008–09, 2009–10 and 2024–25.

== See also ==
- List of FK Budućnost seasons
- ŽFK Budućnost Podgorica
- SD Budućnost Podgorica
- Montenegrin Derby
- Montenegrin First League
- Montenegrin clubs in Yugoslav football competitions (1946–2006)
- Podgorica City Stadium
- Camp FSCG
- Podgorica
