= Slavko Vlahović =

Yugoslav footballer

Personal information
- Date of birth: 7 June 1954 (age 72)
- Place of birth: Kula, PR Serbia, FPR Yugoslavia
- Position: Defender

Youth career
- Mladost Kruščić

Senior career*
Years	Team	Apps	(Gls)
1972–1977	Crvenka	104	(3)
1977–1991	Budućnost Titograd	413	(1)
Total		517	(4)
- * Club domestic league appearances and goals

Slavko Vlahović (Serbian Cyrillic: Славко Влаховић; born 7 June 1954) is a Yugoslav former professional footballer who played as a defender.

== Career ==
Born in Kruščić, a village near Kula, Vlahović made his senior debut with Yugoslav Second League side Crvenka in 1972. He missed the 1973–74 season serving in the Yugoslav Army, before returning to his club.

After leaving Crvenka, Vlahović spent the rest of his career with Budućnost Titograd (1977–1991), becoming the club's most capped player. He is also the second-most capped Yugoslav First League player with 413 appearances, only behind Enver Marić.

== Career statistics ==
Appearances and goals by club, season and competition
Club	Season	League		
Club	Season	Division	Apps	Goals
Crvenka	1972–73	Yugoslav Second League	14	2
Crvenka	1973–74	Yugoslav Second League	0	0
Crvenka	1974–75	Yugoslav Second League	22	0
Crvenka	1975–76	Yugoslav Second League	34	1
Crvenka	1976–77	Yugoslav Second League	34	0
Crvenka	Total		104	3
Budućnost Titograd	1977–78	Yugoslav First League	26	0
Budućnost Titograd	1978–79	Yugoslav First League	33	0
Budućnost Titograd	1979–80	Yugoslav First League	31	0
Budućnost Titograd	1980–81	Yugoslav First League	34	0
Budućnost Titograd	1981–82	Yugoslav First League	30	0
Budućnost Titograd	1982–83	Yugoslav First League	33	0
Budućnost Titograd	1983–84	Yugoslav First League	32	0
Budućnost Titograd	1984–85	Yugoslav First League	26	0
Budućnost Titograd	1985–86	Yugoslav First League	29	0
Budućnost Titograd	1986–87	Yugoslav First League	21	1
Budućnost Titograd	1987–88	Yugoslav First League	34	0
Budućnost Titograd	1988–89	Yugoslav First League	34	0
Budućnost Titograd	1989–90	Yugoslav First League	32	0
Budućnost Titograd	1990–91	Yugoslav First League	18	0
Budućnost Titograd	Total		413	1
Career total			517	4
