= 2009–10 Montenegrin Cup =

Tournament details
- Country: Montenegro
- Teams: 30

Final positions
- Champions: Rudar (2nd title)
- Runners-up: Budućnost

Tournament statistics
- Matches played: 43
- Goals scored: 124 (2.88 per match)
- Top goal scorer: Luka Merdović (9 goals)

The 2009–10 Montenegrin Cup was the fourth season of the Montenegrin knockout football tournament. The winner of the tournament received a berth in the second qualifying round of the 2010–11 UEFA Europa League. The defending champions were Petrovac, who beat Lovćen in the final of the 2008–09 competition. The competition featured 30 teams. It started on 16 September 2009 and ended with the final on 19 May 2010.

== First round ==
The 14 matches played on 16 September 2009.

=== Summary ===
Team 1	Score	Team 2
Crvena Stijena	0–2	Grbalj
Čelik	0–0 (5–3 p)	Mogren
Jedinstvo	2–0	Berane
Gusinje	0–2	Dečić
Sloga Bar	0–7	Rudar
Budućnost	2–1	Otrant
Kom	1–2	Jezero
Pljevlja	1–2	Zeta
Iskra	2–3	Sutjeska
Mornar	1–0	Bratstvo
Petnjica	0–5	Mladost
Drezga	0–0 (5–3 p)	Ibar
Arsenal	1–1 (1–3 p)	Bokelj
Bar	1–0	Zabjelo
Petrovac	bye	
Lovćen	bye	

=== Matches ===
16 September 2009	Crvena Stijena	0–2	Grbalj	Podgorica
16:00 CEST			Matić 47'; Bošković 80'	Stadium: Tološi Stadium; Referee: Aleksandar Marković

16 September 2009	Čelik	0–0 (5–3 p)	Mogren	Nikšić
16:00 CEST				Stadium: Stadion Željezare; Referee: Ivan Jovanović

16 September 2009	Jedinstvo	2–0	Berane	Bijelo Polje
16:00 CEST	Vukotić 20'; Babača 56'			Stadium: Gradski stadion Referee: Darko Gašić

16 September 2009	Gusinje	0–2	Dečić	Gusinje
16:00 CEST			Lekić 56'; Grbović 65'	Stadium: City Stadium; Referee: Mileta Šćepanović

16 September 2009	Sloga Bar	0–7	Rudar	Bar
16:00 CEST			Tomić 5', 30'; Minić 10', 65'; Nestorović 43', 70', 82'	Stadium: Stadion Topolica; Referee: Darko Kovačević

16 September 2009	Budućnost	2–1	Otrant	Podgorica
16:00 CEST	Ćetković 45'; N. Vukčević 62'		Alibegu 46'	Stadium: Podgorica City Stadium; Referee: Milovan Milačić

16 September 2009	Kom	1–2	Jezero	Podgorica
16:00 CEST	Krstović 10' (pen.)		Saletić 55'; Milosavljević 90'	Stadium: Stadion Zlatica; Referee: Vojin Vojinović

16 September 2009	Pljevlja	1–2	Zeta	Pljevlja
16:00 CEST	Ajduković 72'		Knežević 60', 61'	Stadium: Gradski stadion Referee: Miloš Savović

16 September 2009	Iskra	2–3	Sutjeska	Danilovgrad
16:00 CEST	Mrenović 10'; Bukilić 18'		Đikanović 44'; Međedović 50' (pen.); Zvicer 60'	Stadium: Braća Velašević Stadium; Referee: Miloš Bošković

16 September 2009	Mornar	1–0	Bratstvo	Ulcinj
16:00 CEST	Marković 90'			Stadium: Stadion Olympic; Referee: Dragan Borozan

16 September 2009	Petnjica	0–5	Mladost	Berane
16:00 CEST			Vučić 15'; Bošković 20'; Seratlić 70', 90'; Jovović 82'	Stadium: Gradski stadion Referee: Veljko Bošković

16 September 2009	Drezga	0–0 (5–3 p)	Ibar	Piperi
16:00 CEST				Stadium: Drezga Stadium; Referee: Dragan Mijušković

16 September 2009	Arsenal	1–1 (1–3 p)	Bokelj	Tivat
16:00 CEST	Kašćelan 60'		Kaluđerović 49'	Stadium: Stadion u Parku; Referee: Željko Mićović

16 September 2009	Bar	1–0	Zabjelo	Petrovac
16:00 CEST	Jovanović 75'			Stadium: Stadion pod Malim brdom Referee: Ranko Spasojević

== Bracket ==
Round of 16
1	Jezero	1	3	4
16	Mladost	4	6	10
8	Bokelj	0	1	1
9	Grbalj	4	4	8
5	Budućnost	2	2	4
12	Lovćen	0	0	0
4	Dečić	0	0	0
13	Sutjeska	1	2	3
6	Čelik	1	0	1
11	Mornar	3	2	5
3	Jedinstvo	0	1	1
14	Rudar	2	1	3
7	Drezga	0	0	0
10	Petrovac	3	4	7
2	Zeta	0	1	1
15	Bar	2	0	2

Quarter-finals
Mladost	1	3	4
Grbalj	2	4	6
Budućnost	1	1	2
Sutjeska	1	0	1
Mornar	0	1	1
Rudar	0	6	6
Petrovac	1	3	4
Bar	1	1	2

Semi-finals
Grbalj	0	2	2
Budućnost	1	3	4
Rudar	2	0	2
Petrovac	1	0	1

Final
Budućnost	1
Rudar	2

== Second round ==
The 14 winners from the First Round and last year's cup finalists, Petrovac and Lovćen, competed in this round. Starting with this round, all rounds of the competition were two-leg except for the final. The first legs of these matches were played on 21 October 2009 and the second legs on 4 November 2009.

=== Summary ===
Team 1	Agg.	Team 2	1st leg	2nd leg
Bokelj	1–8	Grbalj	0–4	1–4
Jezero	4–10	Mladost	1–4	3–6
Zeta	1–2	Bar	0–2	1–0
Jedinstvo	1–3	Rudar	0–2	1–1
Čelik	1–5	Mornar	1–3	0–2
Dečić	0–3	Sutjeska	0–1	0–2
Drezga	0–7	Petrovac	0–3	0–4
Budućnost	4–0	Lovćen	2–0	2–0

=== First legs ===
21 October 2009	Bokelj	0–4	Grbalj	Kotor
14:00 CEST			Milić 13', 21', 39'; Kasom 60'	Stadium: Stadion pod Vrmcem; Referee: Dražen Petrić

21 October 2009	Jezero	1–4	Mladost	Podgorica
14:00 CEST	Nenadović 23'		Merdović 8', 31', 47' (pen.), 73'	Stadium: Zabjelo Stadium; Referee: Dragan Borozan

21 October 2009	Zeta	0–2	Bar	Golubovci
14:00 CEST			Jovović 56'; Jovančov 90+3'	Stadium: Stadion Trešnjica; Referee: Milovan Milačić

21 October 2009	Jedinstvo	0–2	Rudar	Bijelo Polje
14:00 CEST			Sekulić 17'; Minić 42'	Stadium: Gradski stadion Referee: Ivan Jovanović

21 October 2009	Čelik	1–3	Mornar	Nikšić
14:00 CEST	Vuković 51'		Mešter 27'; Đalac 40', 47'	Stadium: Stadion Željezare; Referee: Darko Kovačević

21 October 2009	Dečić	0–1	Sutjeska	Tuzi
14:00 CEST			Međedović 87'	Stadium: Stadion Tuško Polje; Referee: Željko Mićović

21 October 2009	Drezga	0–3	Petrovac	Piperi
14:00 CEST			Đurašković 44', 55'; Dragićević 83'	Stadium: Drezga Stadium; Referee: Vojin Vojinović

21 October 2009	Budućnost	2–0	Lovćen	Podgorica
14:00 CEST	I. Vuković 4'; N. Vukčević 29'			Stadium: Podgorica City Stadium; Referee: Veljko Bošković

=== Second legs ===
3 November 2009	Bar	0–1 (2–1 agg.)	Zeta	Bar
13:00 CET			Knežević 90'	Stadium: Stadion Topolica; Referee: Željko Mićović

4 November 2009	Grbalj	4–1 (8–1 agg.)	Bokelj	Tivat
13:00 CET	Milić 5', 60'; Đukić 13'; Grujić 89'		Grabovica 67'	Stadium: Stadion u Parku; Referee: Miloš Bošković

4 November 2009	Mladost	6–3 (10–4 agg.)	Jezero	Podgorica
13:00 CET	Merdović 23', 52', 85'; Kontić 73'; Golubović 78'; Seratlić 88'		Šaljaj 16', 55'; Nenadović 69'	Stadium: Mladost Stadium; Referee: Amil Gerina

4 November 2009	Rudar	1–1 (3–1 agg.)	Jedinstvo	Pljevlja
13:00 CET	Minić 21'		A. Bećirović 39'	Stadium: Gradski stadion Referee: Vladan Kojović

4 November 2009	Mornar	2–0 (5–1 agg.)	Čelik	Bar
13:00 CET	Vujačić 26'; Dopuđ 56'			Stadium: Stadion Topolica; Referee: Darko Gašić

4 November 2009	Sutjeska	2–0 (3–0 agg.)	Dečić	Nikšić
13:00 CET	Ćiraković 25'; M. Dževerdanović 43'			Stadium: Gradski stadion Referee: Željko Radunović

4 November 2009	Petrovac	4–0 (7–0 agg.)	Drezga	Petrovac
13:00 CET	Rotković 4', 43'; Lopičić 44'; Lakić 54'			Stadium: Stadion pod Malim brdom Referee: Ivan Jovanović

4 November 2009	Lovćen	0–2 (0–4 agg.)	Budućnost	Cetinje
13:00 CET			Brnović 40'; Ćetković 50'	Stadium: Stadion Obilića poljana Referee: Predrag Radovanović

== Quarter-finals ==
The eight winners from the Second Round competed in this round. The first legs took place on 25 November 2009 and the second legs took place on 9 December 2009.

=== Summary ===
Team 1	Agg.	Team 2	1st leg	2nd leg
Mornar	1–6	Rudar	0–0	1–6
Petrovac	4–2	Bar	1–1	3–1
Mladost	4–6	Grbalj	1–2	3–4
Budućnost	2–1	Sutjeska	1–1	1–0

=== First legs ===
25 November 2010	Mornar	0–0	Rudar	Bar
13:00 CET				Stadium: Stadion Topolica; Referee: Željko Mićović

25 November 2010	Petrovac	1–1	Bar	Petrovac
13:00 CET	Lopičić 27'		Jovović 48'	Stadium: Stadion pod Malim brdom Referee: Ranko Spasojević

25 November 2010	Mladost	1–2	Grbalj	Podgorica
13:00 CET	Merdović 60'		Radusinović 23'; Nikezić 48'	Stadium: Mladost Stadium; Referee: Darko Gašić

25 November 2010	Budućnost	1–1	Sutjeska	Podgorica
13:00 CET	Ćetković 46'		Dževerdanović 62'	Stadium: Podgorica City Stadium; Referee: Jovan Kaluđerović

=== Second legs ===
9 December 2010	Rudar	6–1 (6–1 agg.)	Mornar	Pljevlja
13:00 CET	Ranđelović 9', 20', 56'; Useni 62'; Minić 68', 87'		Mešter 36'	Stadium: Gradski stadion Referee: Dragan Mijušković

9 December 2010	Bar	1–3 (2–4 agg.)	Petrovac	Bar
13:00 CET	Nedović 90'		Radulović 67' (pen.); Rotković 74'; Lopičić 77'	Stadium: Stadion Topolica; Referee: Nikola Dabanović

9 December 2010	Grbalj	4–3 (6–4 agg.)	Mladost	Radanovići
13:00 CET	Kajević 6', 9', 83'; Popović 57'		Merdović 25'; Vučić 45'; Šćepanović 80'	Stadium: Stadion Donja Sutvara; Referee: Darko Gašić

9 December 2010	Sutjeska	0–1 (1–2 agg.)	Budućnost	Nikšić
13:00 CET			I. Vuković 5'	Stadium: Gradski stadion Referee: Ranko Spasojević

== Semi-finals ==
The four winners from the Quarter-finals competed in this round. The first legs took place on 14 April 2010 and the second legs took place on 28 April 2010.

=== Summary ===
Team 1	Agg.	Team 2	1st leg	2nd leg
Grbalj	2–4	Budućnost	0–1	2–3
Rudar	2–1	Petrovac	2–1	0–0

=== First legs ===
14 April 2010	Grbalj	0–1	Budućnost	Radanovići
16:30 CEST			Delić 55'	Stadium: Stadion Donja Sutvara; Referee: Jovan Kaluđerović

14 April 2010	Rudar	2–1	Petrovac	Pljevlja
16:30 CEST	Ranđelović 22', 65'		Mitić 88'	Stadium: Gradski stadion Referee: Mileta Šćepanović

=== Second legs ===
28 April 2010	Petrovac	0–0 (1–2 agg.)	Rudar	Petrovac
17:00 CEST				Stadium: Stadion pod Malim brdom Referee: Jovan Kaluđerović

28 April 2010	Budućnost	3–2 (4–2 agg.)	Grbalj	Podgorica
18:00 CEST	Stolica 40', 45', 83'		I. Bošković 18' (pen.); Matić 25'	Stadium: Podgorica City Stadium; Referee: Nikola Dabanović

== Final ==
19 May 2010
20:30 CEST

Budućnost	1–2	Rudar
Stolica 84'		Ranđelović 4' (pen.); Igumanović 36'

Podgorica City Stadium, Podgorica
Attendance: 7,000
Referee: Jovan Kaluđerović
