= 2018–19 Montenegrin Cup =

Tournament details
- Country: Montenegro
- Teams: 26

Final positions
- Champions: Budućnost (2nd title)
- Runners-up: Lovćen

Tournament statistics
- Matches played: 36
- Goals scored: 100 (2.78 per match)
- Top goal scorer(s): Nemanja Leverda (5 goals)

The 2018–19 Montenegrin Cup was the 13th season of the football tournament in Montenegro. The cup began on 28 August 2018 and ended on 30 May 2019. The winners of this competition earned a place in the UEFA Europa League.

OFK Titograd won the previous season's tournament (under the name Mladost Podgorica), and were the defending champions. The club defeated Igalo in the final by the score of 2–0.

== Format ==
Twenty–six clubs participated in the competition this season. The first round and the final were contested over one leg with all other rounds being contested over two legs.

== First round ==
Draw for the first round was held on 23 August 2018. The first round matches were played on 28–30 August 2018.

=== Summary ===
Team 1	Score	Team 2
Hajduk	0–13	Mornar
Crvena Stijena	0–7	Sutjeska
Komovi	0–6	Zeta
Jedinstvo	0–2	Lovćen
Sloga Bar	0–3 (w/o)	Iskra
Berane	0–3 (w/o)	Rudar
Bokelj	0–1	Petrovac
Borac	0–5	Dečić
Arsenal	3–0	Jezero
Ribnica	0–7	Kom
Otrant-Olympic	0–1	Mladost Lješkopolje
OFK Titograd	bye	
Igalo	bye	
Budućnost	bye	
Grbalj	bye	

=== Matches ===
28 August 2018	Hajduk	0–13	Mornar	Radanovići
17:00 CEST		Report	Leverda 6', 34', 37' (pen.), 49', 75'; L. Merdović 10', 31', 72'; Bušković 17', 90'; Peličić 51'; B. Merdović 70'; Vukmarković 78'	Stadium: Stadion Donja Sutvara; Attendance: 20; Referee: Mihailo Milošević

29 August 2018	Berane	0–3 (Awarded)	Rudar	Berane
				Stadium: Gradski stadion

29 August 2018	Sloga Bar	0–3 (Awarded)	Iskra	Podgorica
				Stadium: Mladost Stadium

29 August 2018	Komovi	0–6	Zeta	Andrijevica
16:00 CEST		Report	Ceklić 15'; Adžović 53'; Klikovac 61'; Krstović 75', 86'; Goranović 88'	Stadium: Stadion Prljanije; Attendance: 200; Referee: Dražen Petrić

29 August 2018	Crvena Stijena	0–7	Sutjeska	Podgorica
17:00 CEST		Report	Nedić 3'; Alharaish 23', 86'; Kordić 42', 60'; Marušić 70'; Ćetković 71'	Stadium: Stadion Zlatica; Attendance: 200; Referee: Aleksandar Šćekić

29 August 2018	Jedinstvo	0–2	Lovćen	Bijelo Polje
17:00 CEST		Report	Vujović 24'; D. Camaj 27'	Stadium: Gradski stadion Attendance: 300; Referee: Dragan Mijušković

29 August 2018	Bokelj	0–1	Petrovac	Kotor
17:00 CEST		Report	Kopitović 57'	Stadium: Stadion pod Vrmcem; Attendance: 200; Referee: Miraš Cerović

29 August 2018	Ribnica	0–7	Kom	Tuzi
17:00 CEST		Report	Golubović 15'; Sentoku 21', 76'; Otašević 24', 88'; Čabarkapa 45+1'; Hot 81'	Stadium: Stadion Tuško Polje; Referee: Ivan Vidaković

30 August 2018	Borac	0–5	Dečić	Bijelo Polje
16:00 CEST		Report	Damjanović 26', 29'; Gazivoda 41'; I. Camaj 13', 59'; Dinosha 63'	Stadium: Gradski stadion Attendance: 80; Referee: Miloš Nedić

30 August 2018	Arsenal	3–0	Jezero	Tivat
17:00 CEST	Bećirović 5'; Mršulja 44'; Pavićević 82'	Report		Stadium: Stadion u Parku; Attendance: 100; Referee: Manojlo Sekulić

30 August 2018	Otrant-Olympic	0–1	Mladost Lješkopolje	Tuzi
17:00 CEST		Report	Tomašević 45+4'	Stadium: Stadion Tuško Polje; Attendance: 80; Referee: Vladimir Bjelica

== Second round ==
Draw for the second round was held on 24 September 2018. Fourteen clubs competed in the second round played over two legs from 3 to 24 October 2018.

=== Summary ===
Team 1	Agg.	Team 2	1st leg	2nd leg
Lovćen	3–2	Dečić	2–1	1–1
Rudar	0–1	Budućnost	0–0	0–1
Petrovac	1–1 (3–1 p)	OFK Titograd	0–1	1–0
Mladost Lješkopolje	4–0	Kom	1–0	3–0
Zeta	3–1	Grbalj	1–0	2–1
Sutjeska	7–1	Iskra	3–0	4–1
Arsenal	0–4	Mornar	0–1	0–3
Igalo	bye			

=== First legs ===
3 October 2018	Lovćen	2–1	Dečić	Danilovgrad
15:00 CEST	D. Camaj 11'; Petričević 57'	Report	I. Camaj 21'	Stadium: Braća Velašević Stadium; Attendance: 100; Referee: Vladimir Bjelica

3 October 2018	Rudar	0–0	Budućnost	Pljevlja
15:00 CEST		Report		Stadium: Gradski stadion Attendance: 300; Referee: Mileta Šćepanović

3 October 2018	Petrovac	0–1	OFK Titograd	Petrovac
15:00 CEST		Report	Mendy 11'	Stadium: Stadion pod Malim brdom Attendance: 100; Referee: Nikola Vođević

3 October 2018	Mladost Lješkopolje	1–0	Kom	Podgorica
15:00 CEST	Matuoke 63'	Report		Stadium: DG Arena; Attendance: 100; Referee: Vladan Kojović

3 October 2018	Zeta	1–0	Grbalj	Golubovci
15:00 CEST	Yamoah 56'	Report		Stadium: Stadion Trešnjica; Attendance: 300; Referee: Miloš Novović

3 October 2018	Sutjeska	3–0	Iskra	Nikšić
15:00 CEST	Alharaish 39'; L. Merdović 71'; Marković 87'			Stadium: Gradski stadion Attendance: 300; Referee: Vojin Vojinović

3 October 2018	Arsenal	0–1	Mornar	Tivat
15:00 CEST		Report	Kalačević 32'	Stadium: Stadion u Parku; Attendance: 100; Referee: Savo Vujović

=== Second legs ===
24 October 2018	Dečić	1–1 (2–3 agg.)	Lovćen	Tuzi
13:30 CEST	Krkanović 50'	Report	Eraković 66'	Stadium: Stadion Tuško Polje; Attendance: 300; Referee: Miloš Bešović

24 October 2018	OFK Titograd	0–1 (1–1 agg.) (1–3 p)	Petrovac	Podgorica
13:30 CEST		Report	Muharemović 75'	Stadium: Mladost Stadium; Attendance: 100; Referee: Miloš Bošković

24 October 2018	Kom	0–3 (0–4 agg.)	Mladost Lješkopolje	Podgorica
13:30 CEST		Report	Bulatović 19'; Jovanović 37'; Seratlić 68'	Stadium: Stadion Zlatica; Attendance: 150; Referee: Nikola Vođević

24 October 2018	Grbalj	1–2 (1–3 agg.)	Zeta	Radanovići
13:30 CEST	Bošković 77'	Report	Yamoah 73'; Adžović 85'	Stadium: Stadion Donja Sutvara; Attendance: 100; Referee: Radoje Pajović

24 October 2018	Iskra	1–4 (1–7 agg.)	Sutjeska	Danilovgrad
13:30 CEST	Jovanović 41'	Report	Alharaish 7'; Kordić 33'; Marušić 55'; Lončar 68'	Stadium: Braća Velašević Stadium; Attendance: 100; Referee: Dražen Petrić

24 October 2018	Mornar	3–0 (4–0 agg.)	Arsenal	Kotor
13:30 CEST	Božović 34' (pen.); Mehović 47'; Džanović 88'	Report		Stadium: Stadion pod Vrmcem; Attendance: 30; Referee: Miraš Cerović

24 October 2018	Budućnost	1–0 (1–0 agg.)	Rudar	Podgorica
17:00 CEST	Tučević 90+1'	Report		Stadium: Podgorica City Stadium; Attendance: 600; Referee: Predrag Radovanović

== Quarter-finals ==
Draw for the quarter-finals was held on 29 October 2018. The quarter-finals were played from 7 to 28 November 2018.

=== Summary ===
Team 1	Agg.	Team 2	1st leg	2nd leg
Budućnost	2–1	Mladost Lješkopolje	1–1	1–0
Mornar	0–4	Lovćen	0–1	0–3
Petrovac	2–1	Zeta	1–1	1–0
Sutjeska	4–1	Igalo	2–0	2–1

=== First legs ===
7 November 2018	Budućnost	1–1	Mladost Lješkopolje	Podgorica
13:30 CET	Radunović 80' (o.g.)	Report	Tiodorović 42' (pen.)	Stadium: Podgorica City Stadium; Attendance: 400; Referee: Vojin Vojinović

7 November 2018	Mornar	0–1	Lovćen	Podgorica
13:30 CET		Report	Đurović 27'	Stadium: Stadion Zlatica; Attendance: 200; Referee: Vladan Kojović

7 November 2018	Petrovac	1–1	Zeta	Petrovac
13:30 CET	Vulaj 10'	Report	Goranović 38'	Stadium: Stadion pod Malim brdom Attendance: 200; Referee: Nikola Vođević

7 November 2018	Sutjeska	2–0	Igalo	Nikšić
15:00 CET	Lončar 22'; Kordić 34'	Report		Stadium: Gradski stadion Attendance: 250; Referee: Miloš Novović

=== Second legs ===
28 November 2018	Mladost Lješkopolje	0–1 (1–2 agg.)	Budućnost	Podgorica
13:00 CET		Report	Mijić 61'	Stadium: DG Arena; Attendance: 500; Referee: Mileta Šćepanović

28 November 2018	Lovćen	3–0 (4–0 agg.)	Mornar	Nikšić
13:00 CET	Eraković 12'; Đurović 20'; Vujović 31'	Report		Stadium: Pomoćni teren FK Sutjeska; Attendance: 50; Referee: Miloš Bošković

28 November 2018	Zeta	0–1 (1–2 agg.)	Petrovac	Golubovci
13:00 CET		Report	Kalezić 55'	Stadium: Stadion Trešnjica; Attendance: 200; Referee: Milovan Milačić

28 November 2018	Igalo	1–2 (1–4 agg.)	Sutjeska	Podgorica
13:00 CET	Pavićević 33' (pen.)	Report	Cicmil 64'; Grbović 73'	Stadium: Camp FSCG; Attendance: 30; Referee: Savo Vujović

== Semi-finals ==
Draw for the semi-finals was held on 8 April 2019. The semi-finals were played from 17 April to 1 May 2019.

=== Summary ===
Team 1	Agg.	Team 2	1st leg	2nd leg
Budućnost	(a) 1–1	Sutjeska	0–0	1–1
Lovćen	5–1	Petrovac	1–1	4–0

=== First legs ===
17 April 2019	Lovćen	1–1	Petrovac	Podgorica
16:00 CEST	Pejaković 70'	Report	Tachibana 90+5'	Stadium: Stadion Zlatica; Attendance: 300; Referee: Mileta Šćepanović

18 April 2019	Budućnost	0–0	Sutjeska	Podgorica
18:00 CEST		Report		Stadium: Podgorica City Stadium; Attendance: 2,000; Referee: Nikola Dabanović

=== Second legs ===
1 May 2019	Petrovac	0–4 (1–5 agg.)	Lovćen	Petrovac
16:30 CEST		Report	Vujović 37'; D. Camaj 51'; Kaluđerović 59'; Pejaković 75'	Stadium: Stadion pod Malim Brdom; Attendance: 1,000; Referee: Miloš Bošković

1 May 2019	Sutjeska	1–1 (1–1(a) agg.)	Budućnost	Nikšić
16:30 CEST	Cicmil 41'	Report	Perović 80'	Stadium: Gradski stadion Attendance: 3,000; Referee: Milovan Milačić

== Final ==
30 May 2019
20:30 CEST

Budućnost	4–0	Lovćen
Perović 8', 23' (pen.), 68'; Zarubica 90'	Report

Podgorica City Stadium, Podgorica
Attendance: 7,500
Referee: Milovan Milačić

== See also ==
- Montenegrin Cup
- Montenegrin First League
