= 2006–07 Montenegrin Cup =

Tournament details
- Country: Montenegro
- Teams: 30

Final positions
- Champions: Rudar (1st title)
- Runners-up: Sutjeska

Tournament statistics
- Matches played: 43
- Goals scored: 100 (2.33 per match)

The 2006–07 Montenegrin Cup was the first season of the Montenegrin knockout football tournament since Montenegro achieved independence. The winner of the tournament received a berth in the first qualifying round of the 2007–08 UEFA Cup. The competition featured 30 teams. It started on 3 October 2006 and ended with the on 30 May 2007. The first winner of the competition was Rudar, who beat Sutjeska in the final.

== First round ==
Last Republic Cup's finalists was received a bye to the Second Round. The remaining 14 matches were played on 3 and 4 October 2006.

=== Summary ===
Team 1	Score	Team 2
Ribnica	0–1	Mladost
Bijela	0–4	Budućnost
Berane	3–3 (4–2 p)	Ibar
Zabjelo	1–2	Grbalj
Otrant	1–1 (4–3 p)	Mogren
Bokelj	3–0	Jedinstvo
Dečić	5–0	Čelik
Arsenal	0–2	Sutjeska
Zeta	2–1	Lovćen
Jezero	0–3	Petrovac
Mornar	0–1	Rudar
Iskra	0–1	Zora
Bratstvo	3–0	Gusinje
Prvijenac	0–1	Komovi
Crvena Stijena	bye	
Kom	bye	

=== Matches ===
3 October 2006	Zabjelo	1–2	Grbalj	Podgorica
14:30 CEST	Kajošević 23'		Bošković 53', 68'	Stadium: Stadion Zabjelo; Attendance: 300; Referee: Saša Rašović

3 October 2006	Arsenal	0–2	Sutjeska	Radanovići
14:30 CEST			Međedović 53' (pen.); Kalezić 90'	Stadium: Stadion Donja Sutvara; Attendance: 400; Referee: Željko Mićović

4 October 2006	Berane	3–3 (4–2 p)	Ibar	Berane
14:30 CEST	Lalević 19' (pen.), 86'; Boričić 90'		Murić 15', 34'; Škrijelj 55' (pen.)	Stadium: Gradski stadion Attendance: 3,000; Referee: Veljko Bošković

4 October 2006	Ribnica	0–1	Mladost	Podgorica
14:30 CEST			Drobnjak 90' (pen.)	Stadium: Stadion na Koniku; Attendance: 500; Referee: Predrag Radovanović

4 October 2006	Bokelj	3–0	Jedinstvo	Kotor
14:30 CEST	Ševaljević 10'; Pejović 63'; Vujović 80'			Stadium: Stadion pod Vrmcem; Attendance: 600; Referee: Aleksandar Marković

4 October 2006	Otrant	1–1 (4–3 p)	Mogren	Ulcinj
14:30 CEST	Radaj 10'		Stanišić 44'	Stadium: Stadion Olympic; Attendance: 1,200; Referee: Duško Globarević

4 October 2006	Dečić	5–0	Čelik	Tuzi
14:30 CEST	Hadžiburić 4'; E. Lekić 24', 40', 45'; Pelević 42'			Stadium: Stadion Tuško Polje; Attendance: 400; Referee: Miloš Bošković

4 October 2006	Bijela	0–4	Budućnost	Bijela
14:30 CEST			Čarapić 8'; Milić 12', 25'; B. Božović 80'	Stadium: Stadion Bijela; Attendance: 1,000; Referee: Amil Gerina

4 October 2006	Jezero	0–3	Petrovac	Plav
14:30 CEST			Divanović 3'; Nenezić 45'; Jablan 83'	Stadium: Stadion Pod Racinom; Attendance: 1,500; Referee: Željko Babović

4 October 2006	Zeta	2–1	Lovćen	Golubovci
14:30 CEST	Z. Peličić 32'; Ćetković 72'		Čolaković 86'	Stadium: Stadion Trešnjica; Attendance: 1,000; Referee: Darko Gašić

4 October 2006	Mornar	0–1	Rudar	Bar
14:30 CEST			Minić 52'	Stadium: Stadion Topolica; Attendance: 800; Referee: Nebojša Rabrenović

4 October 2006	Prvijenac	0–1	Komovi	Bijelo Polje
14:30 CEST			Agović 26'	Stadium: Stadion kod Vunarskog; Attendance: 250; Referee: Darko Kovačević

4 October 2006	Iskra	0–1	Zora	Danilovgrad
14:30 CEST			Kraljević 55'	Stadium: Braća Velašević Stadium; Attendance: 500; Referee: Miloš Savović

4 October 2006	Bratstvo	3–0	Gusinje	Ljajkovići
14:30 CEST	Vukčević 4'; Knežević 45'; Berilažić 75'			Stadium: Stadion Ljajkovići; Attendance: 200; Referee: Želimir Anđelić

== Bracket ==
Round of 16
1	Komovi	1	0	1
16	Zora	5	0	5
8	Budućnost	2	0	2
9	Zeta	0	3	3
5	Sutjeska (pen)	0	1	1 (4)
12	Bokelj	1	0	1 (3)
4	Petrovac	1	1	2
13	Dečić	1	3	4
6	Crvena Stijena	1	0	1
11	Bratstvo	0	0	0
3	Grbalj	5	3	8
14	Kom	0	2	2
7	Berane	0	1	1
10	Rudar	2	1	3
2	Otrant	2	0	2
15	Mladost	2	3	5

Quarter-finals
Zora	1	0	1
Zeta	1	1	2
Sutjeska (a)	0	1	1
Dečić	0	1	1
Crvena Stijena	1	0	1
Grbalj	1	1	2
Rudar	2	0	2
Mladost	0	0	0

Semi-finals
Zeta	3	0	3
Sutjeska (a)	2	1	3
Grbalj	0	0	0
Rudar	2	0	2

Final
Sutjeska	1
Rudar	2

== Second round ==
The first legs were played on 18 October and the second legs were played on 31 October and 1 November 2006.

=== Summary ===
Team 1	Agg.	Team 2	1st leg	2nd leg
Otrant	2–5	Mladost	2–2	0–3
Berane	1–3	Rudar	0–2	1–1
Sutjeska	1–1 (4–3 p)	Bokelj	0–1	1–0
Petrovac	2–4	Dečić	1–1	1–3
Komovi	1–5	Zora	1–5	0–0
Crvena Stijena	1–0	Bratstvo	1–0	0–0
Grbalj	8–2	Kom	5–0	3–2
Budućnost	2–3	Zeta	2–0	0–3

=== First legs ===
18 October 2006	Otrant	2–2	Mladost	Ulcinj
14:00 CEST	Kačinari 23'; Teletović 84'		Ljumić 80', 82'	Stadium: Stadion Olympic; Attendance: 2,500; Referee: Saša Rašović

18 October 2006	Berane	0–2	Rudar	Berane
14:00 CEST			Čakar 17'; Sekulić 75'	Stadium: Gradski stadion Attendance: 3,000; Referee: Duško Globarević

18 October 2006	Sutjeska	0–1	Bokelj	Nikšić
14:00 CEST			Lopičić 66' (pen.)	Stadium: Gradski stadion Attendance: 1,000; Referee: Jovan Kaluđerović

18 October 2006	Petrovac	1–1	Dečić	Petrovac
14:00 CEST	Graovac 61'		Gutić 49'	Stadium: Stadion pod Malim brdom Attendance: 400; Referee: Aleksandar Marković

18 October 2006	Komovi	1–5	Zora	Andrijevica
14:00 CEST	Deletić 50'		Miranović 11'; Kraljević 19', 33', 56'; Petrović 53'	Stadium: Stadion Prljanije; Attendance: 200; Referee: Veljko Bošković

18 October 2006	Crvena Stijena	1–0	Bratstvo	Podgorica
14:00 CEST	Žižić 44'			Stadium: Tološi Stadium; Attendance: 300; Referee: Miloš Savović

18 October 2006	Grbalj	5–0	Kom	Radanovići
14:00 CEST	Stojčev 7', 35'; Bošković 9'; Radović 41'; D. Ivanović 87'			Stadium: Stadion Donja Sutvara; Attendance: 400; Referee: Nikola Dabanović

18 October 2006	Budućnost	2–0	Zeta	Podgorica
18:00 CEST	Burzanović 19', 45' (pen.)			Stadium: Podgorica City Stadium; Attendance: 10,000; Referee: Željko Radunović

=== Second legs ===
31 October 2006	Bratstvo	0–0 (0–1 agg.)	Crvena Stijena	Ljajkovići
13:00 CET				Stadium: Stadion Ljajkovići; Attendance: 200; Referee: Mladen Lopičić

1 November 2006	Mladost	3–0 (5–1 agg.)	Otrant	Podgorica
13:00 CET	Čađenović 19'; Ljumić 32', 60'			Stadium: Stadion Cvijetin Brijeg; Attendance: 300; Referee: Darko Gašić

1 November 2006	Rudar	1–1 (3–1 agg.)	Berane	Pljevlja
13:00 CET	Čakar 85'		Lutovac 20'	Stadium: Gradski stadion Attendance: 2,000; Referee: Predrag Radovanović

1 November 2006	Bokelj	0–1 (1–1 agg.) (3–4 p)	Sutjeska	Kotor
13:00 CET			Karadžić 12'	Stadium: Stadion pod Vrmcem; Attendance: 800; Referee: Nikola Dabanović

1 November 2006	Dečić	3–1 (4–2 agg.)	Petrovac	Tuzi
13:00 CET	Camaj 31', 86'; M. Lekić 84'		Pavićević 8'	Stadium: Stadion Tuško Polje; Attendance: 1,000; Referee: Željko Mićović

1 November 2006	Zora	0–0 (5–1 agg.)	Komovi	Spuž
13:00 CET				Stadium: Spuž City Stadium; Attendance: 300; Referee: Marko Ivanović

1 November 2006	Kom	2–3 (2–8 agg.)	Grbalj	Podgorica
13:00 CET	Tomić 30'; V. Božović 67' (pen.)		D. Ivanović 11' (pen.); Mekić 54'; Đalac 74'	Stadium: Stadion Zlatica; Attendance: 250; Referee: Vladan Kojović

1 November 2006	Zeta	3–0 (3–2 agg.)	Budućnost	Golubovci
13:00 CET	Đurović 16'; Korać 50'; Tumbasević 76'			Stadium: Stadion Trešnjica; Attendance: 4,000; Referee: Jovan Kaluđerović

== Quarter-finals ==
The first legs were played on 15 November and second on 29 November 2006.

=== Summary ===
Team 1	Agg.	Team 2	1st leg	2nd leg
Zora	1–2	Zeta	1–1	0–1
Crvena Stijena	1–2	Grbalj	1–1	0–1
Rudar	2–0	Mladost	2–0	0–0
Sutjeska	(a) 1–1	Dečić	0–0	1–1

=== First legs ===
15 November 2006	Crvena Stijena	1–1	Grbalj	Podgorica
13:00 CET	Lukovac 8' (pen.)		Đalac 18'	Stadium: Tološi Stadium; Attendance: 800; Referee: Nikola Dabanović

15 November 2006	Rudar	2–0	Mladost	Pljevlja
13:00 CET	Čakar 55' (pen.); Minić 60'			Stadium: Gradski stadion Attendance: 3,000; Referee: Jovan Kaluđerović

15 November 2006	Sutjeska	0–0	Dečić	Nikšić
13:00 CET				Stadium: Gradski stadion Attendance: 2,500; Referee: Darko Gašić

15 November 2006	Zora	1–1	Zeta	Spuž
13:00 CET	Kalezić 85'		Krkotić 35'	Stadium: Spuž City Stadium; Attendance: 1,000; Referee: Ranko Spasojević

=== Second legs ===
29 November 2006	Grbalj	1–0 (2–1 agg.)	Crvena Stijena	Radanovići
13:00 CET	Pejović 90+2'			Stadium: Stadion Donja Sutvara; Attendance: 600; Referee: Miloš Novović

29 November 2006	Mladost	0–0 (0–2 agg.)	Rudar	Podgorica
13:00 CET				Stadium: Stadion Cvijetin Brijeg; Attendance: 500; Referee: Goran Mihaljević

29 November 2006	Dečić	1–1 (1–1(a) agg.)	Sutjeska	Tuzi
13:00 CET	Ajković 61'		Dževerdanović 60'	Stadium: Stadion Tuško Polje; Attendance: 1,000; Referee: Ranko Spasojević

29 November 2006	Zeta	1–0 (2–1 agg.)	Zora	Golubovci
13:00 CET	Ćetković			Stadium: Stadion Trešnjica; Attendance: 500; Referee: Vladan Kojović

== Semi-finals ==
The first legs were played on 25 April and second on 16 May 2007.

=== Summary ===
Team 1	Agg.	Team 2	1st leg	2nd leg
Zeta	3–3 (a)	Sutjeska	3–2	0–1
Grbalj	0–2	Rudar	0–2	0–0

=== First legs ===
25 April 2007	Zeta	3–2	Sutjeska	Golubovci
16:00 CEST	Tumbasević 45'; Korać 48' (pen.); Ćetković 62'		Marić 18'; Todorović 75'	Stadium: Stadion Trešnjica; Attendance: 2,000; Referee: Ranko Spasojević

25 April 2007	Grbalj	0–2	Rudar	Radanovići
16:00 CEST			Minić 27'; Čakar 72'	Stadium: Stadion Donja Sutvara; Attendance: 800; Referee: Miloš Novović

=== Second legs ===
16 May 2007	Sutjeska	1–0 (3(a)–3 agg.)	Zeta	Nikšić
17:30 CEST	Todorović 31'			Stadium: Gradski stadion Attendance: 5,000; Referee: Aleksandar Marković

16 May 2007	Rudar	0–0 (2–0 agg.)	Grbalj	Pljevlja
17:30 CEST				Stadium: Gradski stadion Attendance: 4,500; Referee: Ranko Spasojević

== Final ==
30 May 2007
20:00 CEST

Sutjeska	1–2	Rudar
Međedović 54'		Vraneš 31'; Lukovac 35'

Podgorica City Stadium, Podgorica
Attendance: 8,000
Referee: Jovan Kaluđerović
