= 2013–14 Montenegrin Cup =

Tournament details
- Country: Montenegro
- Teams: 30

Final positions
- Champions: Lovćen (1st title)
- Runners-up: Mladost

Tournament statistics
- Matches played: 41
- Goals scored: 109 (2.66 per match)
- Top goal scorer: Ivan Knežević (5 goals)

The 2013–14 Montenegrin Cup was the eighth season of the Montenegrin knockout football tournament. The winner of the tournament received a berth in the first qualifying round of the 2014–15 UEFA Europa League. The defending champions were Budućnost, who beat Čelik in the final of the 2012–13 competition. The competition featured 30 teams. It started on 17 September 2013 and ended with the final on 21 May 2014.

== First round ==
The 14 matches in this round were played on 17 and 18 September 2013.

=== Summary ===
Team 1	Score	Team 2
Petrovac	2–0	Bratstvo
Cetinje	0–2	Grbalj
Tekstilac	0–2	Mladost
Sloga Radovići	0–1	Crvena Stijena
Jezero	2–1	Sutjeska
Hajduk	0–7	Rudar
Brskovo	0–3	Mornar
Lovćen	1–0	Zora
Berane	3–3 (2–4 p)	Zeta
Arsenal	0–4	Mogren
Kom	1–1 (1–4 p)	Dečić
Ribnica	3–1	Igalo
Bokelj	3–0	Ibar
Jedinstvo	1–1 (2–4 p)	Zabjelo
Budućnost	bye	
Čelik	bye	

=== Matches ===
17 September 2013	Sloga Radovići	0–1	Crvena Stijena	Tivat
16:00 CEST		Report		Stadium: Stadion u Parku; Attendance: 50; Referee: Miloš Jabučanin

17 September 2013	Petrovac	2–0	Bratstvo	Petrovac
16:00 CEST	Muhović 56'; Vujačić 89'	Report		Stadium: Stadion pod Malim brdom Attendance: 200; Referee: Miraš Cerović

17 September 2013	Cetinje	0–2	Grbalj	Cetinje
16:00 CEST		Report	Petrović 25'; Milojko 81'	Stadium: Stadion Obilića poljana Attendance: 100; Referee: Miloš Nedić

17 September 2013	Tekstilac	0–2	Mladost	Bijelo Polje
16:00 CEST		Report	Savićević 25'; Knežević 80'	Stadium: Gradski stadion Attendance: 500; Referee: Dražen Petrić

18 September 2013	Ribnica	3–1	Igalo	Podgorica
16:00 CEST	Bukilić 21'; Popadić 45' (pen.); Bukilić 45+4'	Report	Kovačević 40' (pen.)	Stadium: Pomoćni teren FK Budućnost; Attendance: 50; Referee: Đorđije Ćalić

18 September 2013	Kom	1–1 (1–4 p)	Dečić	Podgorica
16:00 CEST	Ljumović 81'	Report	Kuč 76'	Stadium: Stadion Zlatica; Attendance: 300; Referee: Dragan Mijušković

18 September 2013	Jezero	2–1	Sutjeska	Plav
16:00 CEST	Takada 88', 90+2'	Report	Isidorović 83'	Stadium: Stadion Pod Racinom; Referee: Savo Vujović

18 September 2013	Hajduk	0–7	Rudar	Bar
16:00 CEST		Report	Šljivančanin 33'; Kovačević 51'; Ćosović 57', 88'; Kato 69', 81'; Talović 72'	Stadium: Stadion Topolica; Attendance: 100; Referee: Branko Stanić

18 September 2013	Brskovo	0–3	Mornar	Mojkovac
16:00 CEST		Report	Divanović 62' (pen.); Rotković 69'; Smolović 80'	Stadium: Gradski stadion Attendance: 250; Referee: Vojin Vojinović

18 September 2013	Lovćen	1–0	Zora	Cetinje
16:00 CEST	Bogdanović 47'	Report		Stadium: Stadion Obilića poljana Attendance: 100; Referee: Vladimir Bjelica

18 September 2013	Berane	3–3 (2–4 p)	Zeta	Berane
16:00 CEST	Vojinović 16'; Zejnilović 25'; Cavnić 50' (o.g.)	Report	Orlandić 33'; Kukuličić 65'; Dujković 69'	Stadium: Gradski stadion Attendance: 500; Referee: Vladan Kojović

18 September 2013	Arsenal	0–4	Mogren	Tivat
16:00 CEST		Report	Đurović 45'; Đuranović 56', 90+2'; Kalezić 83'	Stadium: Stadion u Parku; Attendance: 300; Referee: Radoje Pajović

18 September 2013	Bokelj	3–0	Ibar	Kotor
16:00 CEST	S. Kašćelan 42'; Maraš 44'; I. Pavićević 49'	Report		Stadium: Stadion pod Vrmcem; Attendance: 100; Referee: Miloš Bešović

18 September 2013	Jedinstvo	1–1 (3–5 p)	Zabjelo	Bijelo Polje
16:00 CEST	Boričić 87'	Report	Đurković 16'	Stadium: Gradski stadion Attendance: 200; Referee: Marko Ivanović

== Second round ==
The 14 winners from the first round and last year's cup finalists, Budućnost and Čelik, compete in this round. Starting with this round, all rounds of the competition were two-legged except for the final. The first legs were on 2 October 2013, while the second legs were on 23 October 2013.

=== Summary ===
Team 1	Agg.	Team 2	1st leg	2nd leg
Budućnost	0−6	Dečić	0−3 (w/o)	0−3 (w/o)
Bokelj	0−4	Mogren	0−0	0−4
Crvena Stijena	2−9	Lovćen	2−1	0−8
Ribnica	2−6	Grbalj	1−3	1−3
Zeta	3−2	Jezero	2−0	1−2
Mornar	2−5	Mladost	2−1	0−4
Rudar	0−0 (3−4 p)	Čelik	0−0	0−0
Zabjelo	2−3	Petrovac	1−2	1−1

=== First legs ===
2 October 2013	Rudar	0–0	Čelik	Pljevlja
15:00 CEST		Report		Stadium: Gradski stadion Attendance: 250; Referee: Aleksandar Marković

2 October 2013	Budućnost	0–3 (Awarded)	Dečić	Podgorica
15:00 CEST	Raspopović 14'; Burzanović 39'; A. Vukčević 51'	Report	Zlatičanin 30'; Pepić 44'	Stadium: Podgorica City Stadium; Attendance: 1,000; Referee: Miloš Savović
Note: The match was originally finished 3–2 for Budućnost, but was awarded 0–3 for Dečić by FA decision. Budućnost fielded a suspended player.

2 October 2013	Zeta	2–0	Jezero	Golubovci
15:00 CEST	Cavnić 38'; Orlandić 51'	Report		Stadium: Stadion Trešnjica; Attendance: 200; Referee: Dražen Petrić

2 October 2013	Ribnica	1–3	Grbalj	Podgorica
15:00 CEST	Metijajić 58'	Report	Mikijelj 14', 44'; N. Kašćelan 81'	Stadium: Camp FSCG; Referee: Nikola Vođević

2 October 2013	Bokelj	0–0	Mogren	Kotor
15:00 CEST		Report		Stadium: Stadion pod Vrmcem; Attendance: 250; Referee: Vladan Kojović

2 October 2013	Zabjelo	1–2	Petrovac	Podgorica
15:00 CEST	Đuretić 68'	Report	Šofranac 44'; Pejaković 63'	Stadium: Zabjelo Stadium; Attendance: 150; Referee: Radoje Pajović

2 October 2013	Mornar	2–1	Mladost	Bar
15:00 CEST	Rotković 35'; Divanović 45+2'	Report	Knežević 75'	Stadium: Stadion Topolica; Referee: Miloš Novović

2 October 2013	Crvena Stijena	2–1	Lovćen	Podgorica
15:00 CEST	Dukić 34'; S. Drobnjak 45+1'	Report	Đorđević 72'	Stadium: Stadion Zlatica; Referee: Boban Živaljević

=== Second legs ===
23 October 2013	Dečić	3–0 (Awarded) (6–0 agg.)	Budućnost	Tuzi
				Stadium: Stadion Tuško Polje
Note: The match was not played because Budućnost was excluded from the competition after the first leg was awarded.

23 October 2013	Čelik	0–0 (0–0 agg.) (4–3 p)	Rudar	Nikšić
14:00 CEST		Report		Stadium: Pomoćni teren FK Sutjeska; Attendance: 200; Referee: Pavle Radovanović

23 October 2013	Jezero	2–1 (2–3 agg.)	Zeta	Plav
14:00 CEST	Milić 44'; Gutić 77'	Report	Musić 49' (o.g.)	Stadium: Stadion Pod Racinom; Attendance: 300; Referee: Radoje Pajović

23 October 2013	Grbalj	3–1 (6–2 agg.)	Ribnica	Radanovići
14:00 CEST	Bogdanović 14'; Đukanović 32'; N. Kašćelan 53'	Report	Metijajić 58'	Stadium: Stadion Donja Sutvara; Referee: Nikola Vođević

23 October 2013	Mogren	4–0 (4–0 agg.)	Bokelj	Budva
14:00 CEST	Golubović 17'; Đurović 33'; Vujović 45'; Rudović 72'	Report		Stadium: Stadion Lugovi; Attendance: 200; Referee: Vojin Vojinović

23 October 2013	Petrovac	1–1 (3–2 agg.)	Zabjelo	Petrovac
14:00 CEST	Kruščić 7'	Report	Rašović 45'	Stadium: Stadion pod Malim brdom Attendance: 130; Referee: Dražen Petrić

23 October 2013	Mladost	4–0 (5–2 agg.)	Mornar	Podgorica
14:00 CEST	Mugoša 18', 38', 49'; Knežević 89'	Report		Stadium: Mladost Stadium; Attendance: 300; Referee: Savo Vujović

23 October 2013	Lovćen	8–0 (9–2 agg.)	Crvena Stijena	Cetinje
14:00 CEST	Perutović 1', 54'; Mirković 14'; Vukčević 16'; Radović 18', 63'; N. Brnović 29'; Halilović 50'	Report		Stadium: Stadion Obilića poljana Referee: Vladimir Bjelica

== Quarter-finals ==
The eight winners from the Second Round competed in this round. The first legs took place on 6 November 2013 and the second legs took place on 27 November 2013.

=== Summary ===
Team 1	Agg.	Team 2	1st leg	2nd leg
Mladost	2−2 (4−2 p)	Čelik	1−1	1−1
Mogren	5−5 (4−3 p)	Grbalj	2−3	3−2
Petrovac	2−1	Dečić	2−0	0−1
Lovćen	(a) 2−2	Zeta	1−0	1−2

=== First legs ===
6 November 2013	Mladost	1–1	Čelik	Podgorica
13:30 CET	Knežević 90+3'	Report	Zorić 70'	Stadium: Mladost Stadium; Referee: Jovan Kaluđerović

6 November 2013	Mogren	2–3	Grbalj	Budva
13:30 CET	D. Marković 33'; Vujović 85' (pen.)	Report	P. Vukčević 29', 65'; Delić 78' (pen.)	Stadium: Stadion Lugovi; Attendance: 150; Referee: Željko Radunović

6 November 2013	Petrovac	2–0	Dečić	Petrovac
13:30 CET	Pejaković 20'; M. Marković 58'	Report		Stadium: Stadion pod Malim brdom Attendance: 200; Referee: Aleksandar Marković

6 November 2013	Lovćen	1–0	Zeta	Cetinje
13:30 CET	Halilović 10'	Report		Stadium: Stadion Obilića poljana Attendance: 200; Referee: Pavle Radovanović

=== Second legs ===
27 November 2013	Čelik	1–1 (2–2 agg.) (2–4 p)	Mladost	Nikšić
13:00 CET	P. Brnović 87'	Report	Knežević 45'	Stadium: Pomoćni teren FK Sutjeska; Referee: Vladan Kojović

27 November 2013	Grbalj	2–3 (5–5 agg.) (3–4 p)	Mogren	Radanovići
13:00 CET	P. Vukčević 36'; Delić 67'	Report	Kalezić 21', 87'; Đurišić 25'	Stadium: Stadion Donja Sutvara; Attendance: 200; Referee: Aleksandar Marković

27 November 2013	Dečić	1–0 (1–2 agg.)	Petrovac	Tuzi
13:00 CET	Kuč 65'	Report		Stadium: Stadion Tuško Polje; Attendance: 500; Referee: Predrag Radovanović

27 November 2013	Zeta	2–1 (2–2(a) agg.)	Lovćen	Golubovci
13:00 CET	Orlandić 30', 44'	Report	N. Vukčević 10'	Stadium: Stadion Trešnjica; Attendance: 300; Referee: Nikola Dabanović

== Semi-finals ==
The four winners from the quarter-finals competed in this round. The first legs took place on 9 April 2014 and the second legs took place on 30 April 2014.

=== Summary ===
Team 1	Agg.	Team 2	1st leg	2nd leg
Petrovac	0–3	Lovćen	0–0	0–3
Mladost	2–0	Mogren	2–0	0–0

=== First legs ===
9 April 2014	Petrovac	0–0	Lovćen	Petrovac
15:00 CEST		Report		Stadium: Stadion pod Malim brdom Attendance: 300; Referee: Nikola Dabanović

9 April 2014	Mladost	2–0	Mogren	Podgorica
16:30 CEST	Novović 47'; Mugoša 72'	Report		Stadium: Mladost Stadium; Attendance: 400; Referee: Jovan Kaluđerović

=== Second legs ===
30 April 2014	Lovćen	3–0 (3–0 agg.)	Petrovac	Cetinje
16:30 CEST	Vujanović 10'; Kosović 53'; Merdović 75'	Report		Stadium: Stadion Obilića poljana Attendance: 700; Referee: Nikola Dabanović

30 April 2014	Mogren	0–0 (0–2 agg.)	Mladost	Budva
16:30 CEST		Report		Stadium: Stadion Lugovi; Attendance: 200; Referee: Predrag Radovanović

== Final ==
21 May 2014
20:30 CEST

Mladost	0–1	Lovćen
		Božović 48'

Podgorica City Stadium, Podgorica
Attendance: 6,000
Referee: Pavle Radovanović
