= 2006–07 Montenegrin First League =

Montenegrin First League
- Season: 2006–07
- Dates: 11 August 2006 – 26 May 2007
- Champions: Zeta; 1st title
- Relegated: Jedinstvo; Berane
- Champions League: Zeta
- UEFA Cup: Budućnost; Rudar
- Intertoto Cup: Grbalj
- Matches: 198
- Goals: 414 (2.09 per match)
- Top goalscorer: Damir Čakar; Žarko Korać (16 goals each)
- Biggest home win: Budućnost 5–1 Grbalj (14 April 2007); Zeta 5–1 Jedinstvo (18 April 2007)
- Biggest away win: Mladost 0–4 Zeta (20 September 2006); Dečić 0–4 Zeta (5 May 2007)
- Highest scoring: Sutjeska 3–5 Mladost (11 November 2006)
- Longest winning run: 6 games Budućnost; Zeta
- Longest unbeaten run: 17 games Budućnost
- Longest losing run: 6 games Berane

The 2006–07 Montenegrin First League season was the inaugural season of the league as Montenegro's top-tier football competition. Although the league existed before, it was previously a second-tier league, underneath the Serbo-Montenegrin First League. Upon the independence of Montenegro and the establishment of a Montenegrin Football Association, the league became disassociated with the Serbo-Montenegrin league and thus was given its present position.

The league played its first games of the season on 12 August 2006 and its final matches were played on 26 May 2007. On 26 May, after their final match, FK Zeta were confirmed as the league's first-ever champions under the new FA, and thus qualified as the country's first-ever UEFA Champions League competitor.

== Teams ==
Location of the 2006–07 Montenegrin First League teams

In order of their 2005-06 league table position, the inaugural members are:

From the former First League of Serbia and Montenegro

- FK Zeta
- FK Budućnost Podgorica
- FK Jedinstvo

From the second-tier Montenegrin First League

- FK Rudar Pljevlja
- FK Sutjeska
- FK Kom
- FK Grbalj
- FK Mogren
- OFK Petrovac
- FK Dečić

Promoted from the Montenegrin Second League

- FK Berane
- FK Mladost (Podgorica)

=== Stadia and locations ===
| Team | City | Stadium | Capacity | Coach |
|---|---|---|---|---|
| Berane | Berane | Gradski Stadion | 11,000 | (Montenegro) Slobodan Đukić |
| Budućnost | Podgorica | Stadion Pod Goricom | 18,000 | (Montenegro) Božidar Vuković |
| Dečić | Tuzi | Stadion Tuško Polje | 1,250 | (Montenegro) Mladen Vukićević |
| Grbalj | Radanovići | Stadion Donja Sutvara | 1,500 | (Montenegro) Dragan Pican |
| Jedinstvo | Bijelo Polje | Gradski Stadion | 5,000 | (Montenegro) Siniša Jelić |
| Kom | Podgorica | Stadion Zlatica | 2,500 | (Montenegro) Saša Petrović |
| Mladost | Podgorica | Cvijetni Brijeg | 2,000 | (Montenegro) Dimitrije Mitrović |
| Mogren | Budva | Stadion Lugovi | 4,000 | (Montenegro) Miodrag Bajović |
| Petrovac | Petrovac | Stadion Pod Malim Brdom | 1,400 | (Montenegro) Milorad Malovrazić |
| Rudar | Pljevlja | Stadion Pod Golubinjom | 10,000 | (Montenegro) Mirko Marić |
| Sutjeska | Nikšić | Stadion Kraj Bistrice | 10,800 | (Montenegro) Pero Giljen |
| Zeta | Golubovci | Stadion Trešnjica | 7,000 | (Montenegro) Dejan Vukićević |

== League table ==
| Pos | Team | Pld | W | D | L | GF | GA | GD | Pts | Qualification or relegation |
|---|---|---|---|---|---|---|---|---|---|---|
| 1 | Zeta (C) | 33 | 25 | 4 | 4 | 65 | 18 | +47 | 79 | Qualification for the Champions League second qualifying round |
| 2 | Budućnost | 33 | 22 | 10 | 1 | 58 | 12 | +46 | 76 | Qualification for the UEFA Cup first qualifying round |
| 3 | Grbalj | 33 | 14 | 7 | 12 | 37 | 30 | +7 | 49 | Qualification for the Intertoto Cup first round |
| 4 | Rudar | 33 | 14 | 5 | 14 | 37 | 32 | +5 | 47 | Qualification for the UEFA Cup first qualifying round (Note: Rudar qualified for the UEFA Cup first qualifying round of the UEFA Cup as winners of 2006–07 Montenegrin Cup.) |
| 5 | Mogren | 33 | 10 | 12 | 11 | 27 | 27 | 0 | 42 | |
| 6 | Petrovac | 33 | 10 | 10 | 13 | 24 | 37 | −13 | 40 | |
| 7 | Kom | 33 | 9 | 11 | 13 | 27 | 31 | −4 | 38 | |
| 8 | Sutjeska | 33 | 10 | 8 | 15 | 24 | 33 | −9 | 38 | |
| 9 | Mladost | 33 | 9 | 11 | 13 | 34 | 49 | −15 | 38 | |
| 10 | Dečić (O) | 33 | 8 | 10 | 15 | 29 | 46 | −17 | 34 | Qualification for the relegation play-offs |
| 11 | Jedinstvo (R) | 33 | 6 | 13 | 14 | 27 | 51 | −24 | 31 | Qualification for the relegation play-offs |
| 12 | Berane (R) | 33 | 7 | 7 | 19 | 25 | 48 | −23 | 28 | Relegated to the Second League |

Source: Soccerway
Rules for classification: 1) Points; 2) Head-to-head points; 3) Head-to-head goal difference; 4) Head-to-head goals scored; 5) Head-to-head away goals scored; 6) Goal difference; 7) Goals scored; 8) Draw.
(C) Champions; (O) Play-off winners; (R) Relegated

== Results ==
The schedule consists of three rounds. During the first two rounds, each team played each other once home and away for a total of 22 matches. The pairings of the third round will then be set according to the standings after the first two rounds, giving every team a third game against each opponent for a total of 33 games per team.

=== First and second round ===
| Home \ Away | BER | BUD | DEČ | GRB | JED | KOM | MLA | MOG | PET | RUD | SUT | ZET |
|---|---|---|---|---|---|---|---|---|---|---|---|---|
| Berane | | 0–2 | 2–0 | 2–0 | 0–1 | 1–1 | 3–1 | 2–0 | 0–0 | 0–0 | 1–0 | 1–4 |
| Budućnost | 4–0 | | 3–2 | 0–0 | 4–0 | 2–0 | 4–3 | 1–0 | 3–0 | 1–0 | 1–0 | 0–0 |
| Dečić | 2–2 | 0–3 | | 1–1 | 1–1 | 2–2 | 3–0 | 0–0 | 0–0 | 1–3 | 1–0 | 0–4 |
| Grbalj | 1–0 | 1–2 | 2–1 | | 0–0 | 0–1 | 0–1 | 1–0 | 0–0 | 3–0 | 1–0 | 2–1 |
| Jedinstvo | 1–2 | 0–0 | 1–0 | 0–3 | | 1–0 | 0–0 | 1–1 | 0–0 | 1–1 | 2–2 | 0–3 |
| Kom | 1–1 | 1–1 | 1–0 | 1–0 | 4–1 | | 1–2 | 0–0 | 3–1 | 2–0 | 1–0 | 0–1 |
| Mladost | 2–1 | 0–3 | 0–0 | 2–0 | 3–0 | 0–0 | | 0–0 | 0–0 | 1–0 | 0–1 | 1–1 |
| Mogren | 3–0 | 1–0 | 1–1 | 1–1 | 1–1 | 1–0 | 0–0 | | 1–2 | 3–1 | 1–0 | 1–1 |
| Petrovac | 1–0 | 1–1 | 0–1 | 0–2 | 3–2 | 0–0 | 2–1 | 0–2 | | 1–0 | 1–0 | 1–0 |
| Rudar | 1–0 | 0–2 | 3–0 | 1–0 | 3–0 | 2–1 | 4–0 | 1–0 | 2–0 | | 2–0 | 1–2 |
| Sutjeska | 1–0 | 0–0 | 1–0 | 0–0 | 1–0 | 0–0 | 3–5 | 1–0 | 1–1 | 1–0 | | 0–2 |
| Zeta | 2–1 | 0–3 (Note: The match between Zeta and Budućnost was not played because the management of Zeta was not satisfied with the choice of the referee (Goran Mihaljević) and locked the gates of the stadium. It is registered with the official score of 0–3 for the guests.) | 2–0 | 1–0 | 4–2 | 1–0 | 3–0 | 4–0 | 2–1 | 2–0 | 1–0 | |

Source: Football Association of Montenegro (in Montenegrin),
Legend: Blue = home team win; Yellow = draw; Red = away team win.

=== Third round ===
Key numbers for pairing determination (number marks position after 22 games):

Rounds
| 23rd | 24th | 25th | 26th | 27th | 28th | 29th | 30th | 31st | 32nd | 33rd |
| 1 – 12; 2 – 11; 3 – 10; 4 – 9; 5 – 8; 6 – 7 | 1 – 2; 8 – 6; 9 – 5; 10 – 4; 11 – 3; 12 – 7 | 2 – 12; 3 – 1; 4 – 11; 5 – 10; 6 – 9; 7 – 8 | 1 – 4; 2 – 3; 9 – 7; 10 – 6; 11 – 5; 12 – 8 | 3 – 12; 4 – 2; 5 – 1; 6 – 11; 7 – 10; 8 – 9 | 1 – 6; 2 – 5; 3 – 4; 10 – 8; 11 – 7; 12 – 9 | 4 – 12; 5 – 3; 6 – 2; 7 – 1; 8 – 11; 9 – 10 | 1 – 8; 2 – 7; 3 – 6; 4 – 5; 11 – 9; 12 – 10 | 5 – 12; 6 – 4; 7 – 3; 8 – 2; 9 – 1; 10 – 11 | 1 – 10; 2 – 9; 3 – 8; 4 – 7; 5 – 6; 12 – 11 | 6 – 12; 7 – 5; 8 – 4; 9 – 3; 10 – 2; 11 – 1 |

| Home \ Away | BER | BUD | DEČ | GRB | JED | KOM | MLA | MOG | PET | RUD | SUT | ZET |
|---|---|---|---|---|---|---|---|---|---|---|---|---|
| Berane | | | 1–2 | 1–3 | | 1–0 | 1–3 | | | | | 0–2 |
| Budućnost | 3–0 | | | 5–1 | 1–1 | 2–0 | 2–0 | | | | | 1–0 |
| Dečić | | 0–1 | | | | | | 2–0 | 1–1 | 0–0 | 2–1 | |
| Grbalj | | | 3–1 | | 2–0 | | | 0–1 | 2–0 | | 2–0 | 2–3 |
| Jedinstvo | 2–0 | | 3–0 | | | 0–0 | | 1–0 | | | 2–2 | |
| Kom | | | 0–1 | 2–2 | | | 2–0 | | | | 0–1 | 0–0 |
| Mladost | | | 2–4 | 2–0 | 1–1 | | | 2–2 | | | 1–1 | 0–4 |
| Mogren | 0–0 | 0–0 | | | | 2–0 | | | 2–0 | 1–2 | | |
| Petrovac | 2–1 | 0–2 | | | 2–0 | 2–3 | 0–0 | | | 2–0 | | |
| Rudar | 1–1 | 0–0 | | 0–2 | 2–1 | 3–0 | 3–1 | | | | | |
| Sutjeska | 2–0 | 1–1 | | | | | | 1–2 | 1–0 | 2–1 | | |
| Zeta | | | 2–0 | | 5–1 | | | 1–0 | 4–0 | 1–0 | 2–0 | |

Source: Football Association of Montenegro (in Montenegrin),
Legend: Blue = home team win; Yellow = draw; Red = away team win.

== Relegation play-offs ==
The 10th-placed team (against the 3rd-placed team of the Second League) and the 11th-placed team (against the 2nd-placed team of the Second League) will both compete in two-legged relegation play-offs after the end of the season.

=== Summary ===
| Team 1 | Agg. | Team 2 | 1st leg | 2nd leg |
|---|---|---|---|---|
| Jedinstvo | 2–4 | Bokelj | 1–4 | 1–0 |
| Ibar | 2–3 | Dečić | 2–2 | 0–1 |

=== Matches ===
2 June 2007
17:30 CEST

| Jedinstvo | 1–4 | Bokelj |
|---|---|---|
| Čindrak 59' (pen.) | Report (page 37) | Vujović 9'; Lasić 63', 65'; Jovanović 80' |

Gradski stadion, Bijelo Polje
Attendance: 3,000
Referee: Amil Gerina
9 June 2007
17:30 CEST

| Bokelj | 0–1 | Jedinstvo |
|---|---|---|
| | Report (page 37) | Babača 43' (pen.) |

Stadion pod Vrmcem, Kotor
Attendance: 2,000
Referee: Pavle Radovanović

Jedinstvo won 5–1 on aggregate.

2 June 2007
17:30 CEST

| Ibar | 2–2 | Dečić |
|---|---|---|
| Pandurica 31'; B. Škrijelj 64' (pen.) | Report (page 37) | Ljumović 30', 44' |

Gradski stadion, Berane
Attendance: 2,000
Referee: Ranko Spasojević
9 June 2007
17:30 CEST

| Dečić | 1–0 | Ibar |
|---|---|---|
| Kojašević 87' | Report (page 37) |

Stadion Tuško Polje, Tuzi
Attendance: 1,500
Referee: Aleksandar Marković

Dečić won 3–2 on aggregate.

== Top scorers ==
| Rank | Scorer | Club | Goals |
|---|---|---|---|
| 1 | (Montenegro) Damir Čakar | Rudar | 16 |
| 1 | (Montenegro) Žarko Korać | Zeta | 16 |
| 3 | (Montenegro) Aljbino Camaj | Dečić | 13 |
| 4 | (Montenegro) Slaven Stjepanović | Zeta | 12 |
| 5 | (Montenegro) Dragan Bošković | Grbalj | 11 |
| 5 | (Montenegro) Igor Burzanović | Budućnost | 11 |
| 7 | (Montenegro) Nemanja Vukašinović | Mogren | 10 |
