= Joseph Cudjoe =

Joseph Cudjoe may refer to:

- Joseph Cudjoe (footballer)
- Joseph Cudjoe (politician)
