= Kwame Otu =

Ghanaian professional footballer

Personal information
- Date of birth: 11 January 2002 (age 24)
- Place of birth: Ghana
- Position: Forward

Youth career
- Dreams F.C.
- Still Believe FC

Senior career*
Years	Team	Apps	(Gls)
2019–2021	Dreams	10	(1)
2021–2024	Vision	57	(11)
2024–	SJK II	0	(0)
2024	→ SalPa (loan)	12	(0)
2024	→ KTP (loan)	12	(0)
2025	KTP	0	(0)
2025–2026	DSC Hanseat	27	(24)

International career
2022–	Ghana	3	(0)
- * Club domestic league appearances and goals as of 26 October 2024

Kwame Otu (born 11 January 2002) is a Ghanaian professional footballer who plays as a forward.

== Youth career ==
Otu played for and is a product of the Dreams FC youth side Still Believe FC. He was promoted to the senior team in 2019.

== Club career ==
In December 2019, Otu was promoted from the senior team in January 2019, ahead of the 2019–20 Ghana Premier League season. On 5 January 2020, he made his debut in a 1–o victory over West African Football Academy (WAFA), coming on in the 57th minute for Emmanuel Ocran. He scored his On 27 January 2020, he scored his debut goal after scoring a consolation goal in the 90+ minute in a 2–1 loss to Ebusua Dwarfs. He went on and played 10 league matches and scored in 1 before the league was cancelled as a result of the COVID-19 pandemic.

With the league set to restart for the 2020–21 Ghana Premier League season, he was named on the team's senior squad list.

After playing for fellow Ghanaian side Vision FC in Ghana Division One, on 1 April 2024, Otu signed with Finnish Veikkausliiga club SJK organisation. It was also announced that he will be loaned out to Ykkösliiga club Salon Palloilijat (SalPa) for the 2024 season. On 4 July 2024, Otu was further loaned out to Ykkösliiga club KTP. On 27 August, KTP exercised their purchase option and signed a permanent contract with Otu until the end of the 2026 season. KTP won the 2024 Ykkösliiga title and were promoted to top-tier Veikkausliiga.

== International career ==
Otu has made three appearances for the Ghana national team in the 2022 African Nations Championship in January 2023.

== Conviction of rape ==
On 11 February 2025, it was reported in Finnish media that a player of KTP was sidelined from the club's operations due to ongoing police investigation of a suspected crime. On 24 March 2025, it was reported that the suspected crime was rape. On 2 April 2025, Otu was found guilty of rape by the Kymenlaakso district court and was given a 22-month probationary prison sentence and additional 60 hours of community service and a total fine of €5,500. Although the judgment was not final, it was sufficient for KTP to terminate their contract with him. The Court of Appeal changed his suspended rape sentence to unsuspended imprisonment.

== Career statistics ==
=== Club ===
As of 25 May 2026

Appearances and goals by club, season and competition
Club	Season	League			National cup (Note: Includes Suomen Cup)		Continental		Other		Total	
Club	Season	Division	Apps	Goals	Apps	Goals	Apps	Goals	Apps	Goals	Apps	Goals
Dreams	2019–20	Ghana Premier League	10	1	–		–		–		10	1
Vision	2021–22	Ghana Division One	25	2	–		–		–		25	2
Vision	2022–23	Ghana Division One	24	6	–		–		–		24	6
Vision	2023–24	Ghana Division One	8	3	–		–		–		8	3
Vision	Total		67	12	0	0	0	0	0	0	67	12
SJK Akatemia	2024	Ykkösliiga	0	0	0	0	–		0	0	0	0
SalPa (loan)	2024	Ykkösliiga	12	0	2	0	–		0	0	14	0
KTP (loan)	2024	Ykkösliiga	12	0	–		–		–		12	0
KTP	2025	Veikkausliiga	0	0	0	0	–		3 (Note: Appearances in Finnish League Cup)	1	3	1
DSC Hanseat	2025-26	Fußball-Bezirksliga Hamburg	27	24	–		–		–		27	24
Career total			118	36	2	0	0	0	3	1	123	37

=== International ===
As of match played 28 January 2023

Ghana
Year	Apps	Goals
2023	3	0
Total	3	0

== Honours ==
KTP

- Ykkösliiga: 2024
