= Milija Pavićević =

- Professor Dr Milija Pavićević (1943–2011)
- Born: Milija (Dragoje) Pavićević; 5 December 1943; Andrijevica, Montenegro, Yugoslavia
- Died: 26 June 2011 (aged 67)
- Education: University of Belgrade Faculty of Medicine
- Occupations: Physician, neuropsychiatrist, senior medical specialist (primarius), professor
- Spouse: Vesna Pavićević
- Scientific career
- Fields: Neuropsychiatry, epidemiology of multiple sclerosis

Milija (Dragoje) Pavićević (Serbian Cyrillic: Милија (Драгоје) Павићевић; 5 December 1943 – 26 June 2011) was a physician, neuropsychiatrist, Doctor of Medical Sciences, senior medical specialist (primarius), and professor.

He was one of the prominent figures in neuropsychiatry in Yugoslavia and Montenegro. He founded and headed the first neuropsychiatric department in Bijelo Polje. His professional and scientific work was particularly focused on neuropsychiatry and the epidemiology of multiple sclerosis in Montenegro. He served as director of the General Hospital in Bijelo Polje, president of the Medical Association of Montenegro, and president of the Neuropsychiatric Section of Montenegro. He was the author of medical publications and participated in professional and scientific activities in the fields of neurology and psychiatry.

== Biography ==
=== Early life and education ===
Dr Milija Pavićević was born on 5 December 1943 in Andrijevica, Montenegro, then part of Yugoslavia.

He studied medicine at the University of Belgrade, where he obtained his medical degree in 1969. He completed his specialisation in neuropsychiatry in 1975 and attained the professional title of primarius, a senior medical specialist designation, in 1980.

In 2000, he obtained the degree of Doctor of Medical Sciences in Belgrade after successfully defending his doctoral dissertation entitled Kliničko-epidemiološka studija multiple skleroze u Crnoj Gori (Clinical and Epidemiological Study of Multiple Sclerosis in Montenegro).

=== Medical career ===
Dr Pavićević spent a substantial part of his professional career in Montenegro, where he contributed to the organisation and development of specialist healthcare services in the fields of neurology and psychiatry.

He established the Neuropsychiatric Department in Bijelo Polje and subsequently served as its head. According to an obituary written by Professor Dr Mihailo Pantović and published in PONS Medical Journal, the department enjoyed a high professional reputation for many years among healthcare institutions outside the major medical centres of the former Yugoslavia.

During his career, he held the position of director of the General Hospital in Bijelo Polje. He served several terms as president of the Medical Association of Montenegro and also chaired the Neuropsychiatric Section of Montenegro. In addition, he participated in the activities of professional medical associations at the Yugoslav level. His professional responsibilities encompassed clinical practice, the organisation of healthcare services, the continuing professional development of medical personnel, and activities within medical associations.

== Scientific research ==
Dr Pavićević's scientific research was particularly concerned with the epidemiology of multiple sclerosis in Montenegro. He devoted his doctoral dissertation, completed in 2000, and his monograph Kliničko-epidemiološka studija multiple skleroze u Crnoj Gori (Clinical and Epidemiological Study of Multiple Sclerosis in Montenegro), published in Montenegro in 2009, to this subject.

He also participated in international scientific research into the prevalence and geographical distribution of multiple sclerosis. His publications included the conference abstracts The Prevalence Variations of Multiple Sclerosis in Montenegro and The Multiple Sclerosis Cluster in Southern Europe, published in 2001 in a supplement to the Journal of the Neurological Sciences as part of the 17th World Congress of Neurology.

He was also a co-author of Epidemiological Investigation of Multiple Sclerosis in Montenegro, which appeared in the book of abstracts of the Sixth Panhellenic Congress of the Greek Multiple Sclerosis Society, held in Thessaloniki in 2002.

== Teaching and professional activities ==
In addition to his clinical and scientific research, Dr Milija Pavićević was involved in the higher education of healthcare professionals and the preparation of specialist medical literature. He taught at the Higher Medical School in Berane and participated in a study programme of the Faculty of Medicine at the University of Montenegro. His professional activities included teaching medical subjects and preparing educational materials intended for students undertaking healthcare studies.

He was the author of Psihijatrija i njega psihijatrijskih bolesnika (Psychiatry and the Care of Psychiatric Patients), a book intended for the education and training of healthcare professionals, published in 2009. The book comprises 111 pages, and its bibliographic record identifies the Faculty of Medicine in Podgorica and the Higher Medical School in Berane.

His professional activities also included participation in medical associations and contributions to specialist medical publications.

== Social, cultural and sporting activities ==
According to a biographical account by Mihailo Pantović, Dr Pavićević was involved in acting, poetry, travel writing and television reporting during his youth. He also pursued mountaineering and was active in associations concerned with science, culture, sport and recreation. The same source states that, in his youth, he represented Montenegro in handball and shooting sports.

== Selected bibliography ==
=== Books ===
- Pavićević, Milija D. (2009). Psihijatrija i njega psihijatrijskih bolesnika (Psychiatry and the Care of Psychiatric Patients). Bijelo Polje: Pegaz. 111 pages. ISBN 978-86-7792-220-7.
- Pavićević, Milija (2009). Epidemiološko-klinička studija multiple skleroze u Crnoj Gori (Epidemiological and Clinical Study of Multiple Sclerosis in Montenegro). Bijelo Polje: Pegaz. 159 pages. ISBN 978-86-7792-218-4. The publication is bibliographically registered in the Montenegrin COBISS.CG system under identification number 14217232.

The book belongs to the fields of neurology and epidemiology and focuses on the study of multiple sclerosis in Montenegro. The study examines the epidemiological characteristics of the disease, its geographical distribution, incidence, clinical forms and factors associated with its occurrence.

=== Doctoral dissertation ===
- Pavićević, Milija (2000). Kliničko-epidemiološka studija multiple skleroze u Crnoj Gori (Clinical and Epidemiological Study of Multiple Sclerosis in Montenegro). Doctoral dissertation. Belgrade. 190 leaves.

The scientific work is registered in the shared bibliographic and cataloguing database COBIB.SR, within the COBISS library information system, under identification number COBISS.SR-ID 20653327. The study addresses the clinical and epidemiological aspects of multiple sclerosis in Montenegro, with particular emphasis on the geographical distribution of the disease, its incidence, clinical characteristics and epidemiological factors associated with its occurrence.

=== Selected conference papers ===
- Pavićević, M.; Pantović, M.; Alexopulos, H.; Pantović, V. (2001). "The Prevalence Variations of Multiple Sclerosis in Montenegro". Journal of the Neurological Sciences, 187 (Supplement 1): S347.
- Alexopulos, H.; Pantović, M.; Pavićević, M.; Pantović, P. (2001). "The Multiple Sclerosis Cluster in Southern Europe". Journal of the Neurological Sciences, 187 (Supplement 1): S347–S348.
- Pantović, V.; Pantović, M.; Pavićević, M.; Alexopulos, H. (2002). "Epidemiological Investigation of Multiple Sclerosis in Montenegro". Book of Abstracts of the Sixth Panhellenic Congress of the Greek Multiple Sclerosis Society, Thessaloniki, pp. 34–36.

== Death and remembrance ==
Milija Pavićević died on 26 June 2011, aged 67.

In the same year, Mihailo Pantović published an obituary commemorating his life and work in PONS Medical Journal. The obituary described his medical and scientific work, his contribution to the establishment of the Neuropsychiatric Department in Bijelo Polje, the leadership positions he held, and his involvement in cultural and social activities.

=== Remembrance ===
Beyond his professional and scientific achievements, Dr Milija Pavićević's name has been preserved in the oral traditions and everyday speech of sections of the population of Montenegro. According to accounts given by local residents, the colloquial expression "Ovaj je za Miliju" ("This one is for Milija") has been used since the 1980s, most commonly in a humorous or ironic context, to describe someone whose behaviour is regarded as unusual or unconventional.
