= Vision F.C. =

Vision
- Logo
- Full name: Vision Football Club
- Founded: 1999; 27 years ago
- Ground: Nii Adjei Kraku II Sports Complex, Tema
- Capacity: 2,500 (1,000 seated)
- President: Michael Osekre
- Coach: Nana Kweku Agyemang
- League: Ghana Premier League
- 2025–26: 10th
- Website: myvisionfc.com

Vision Football Club is a Ghanaian football club based in Accra. It is currently playing in the Ghana Premier League.

== History ==
The club was founded in 1999 as Eleven Strangers. In 2001, the club was renamed to Vision Football Club. The club was registered in Division Three in 2007, absorbing graduated U-17 boys. In 2009, Vision Football Club qualified for the Greater Accra Regional Second Division, placing fourth out of twelve teams during the 2009–10 season.

The club has brought in Serbian international coaches for every season since 2009. In the 2010–11 and 2011–12 seasons, they were the league winners of the Greater Accra Regional Second Division – Zone 4. The club played in the F.A Cup competition in 2010/2011. In 2014, some of Vision FC players were sent out of Ghana to play with international teams.

Vision Football Club has three youth teams: Validus Football Club in the Regional Division Two, U-17, and U-15 teams.

== Club management ==
Founder – George Aforklenyuie

President – Michael Osekre

Vice President – Obiri Kwaku

Administrative Manager – Wisdom Vandyke Cudjoe

Chief Executive Officer- Abdul Rahman Yakubu

Director of Operations- Amin Ramadan

Coach – Nana Kweku Agyemang

== Notable former players ==
- Bismarck Appiah
- Joseph Cudjoe
- Samuel Kwame Owusu
- Zakaria Suraka
- Michael Baidoo
- Ernest Boateng
- Alex Yamoah
- Terry Yegbe
- Salim Yussif
- Kwame Otu
- Emmanuel Akansase

== Coach history ==
Dates	Coaches
2001–2013	Foster Alhassan
2013–2016	Ivan Bujagić
2016–2019	Vladislav Virić
2019–2021	Prince Owusu
2021–2022	Dragojlo Stanojlović
2022–2023	Vladislav Virić
2023–2024	Hamza Obeng Mohammed; Ibrahim Otoo
2024–	Nana Kweku Agyemang; Hamza Obeng Mohammed; Ibrahim Otoo
