= Mihailo Lalić =

Montenegrin and Serbian writer

- Михаило Лалић
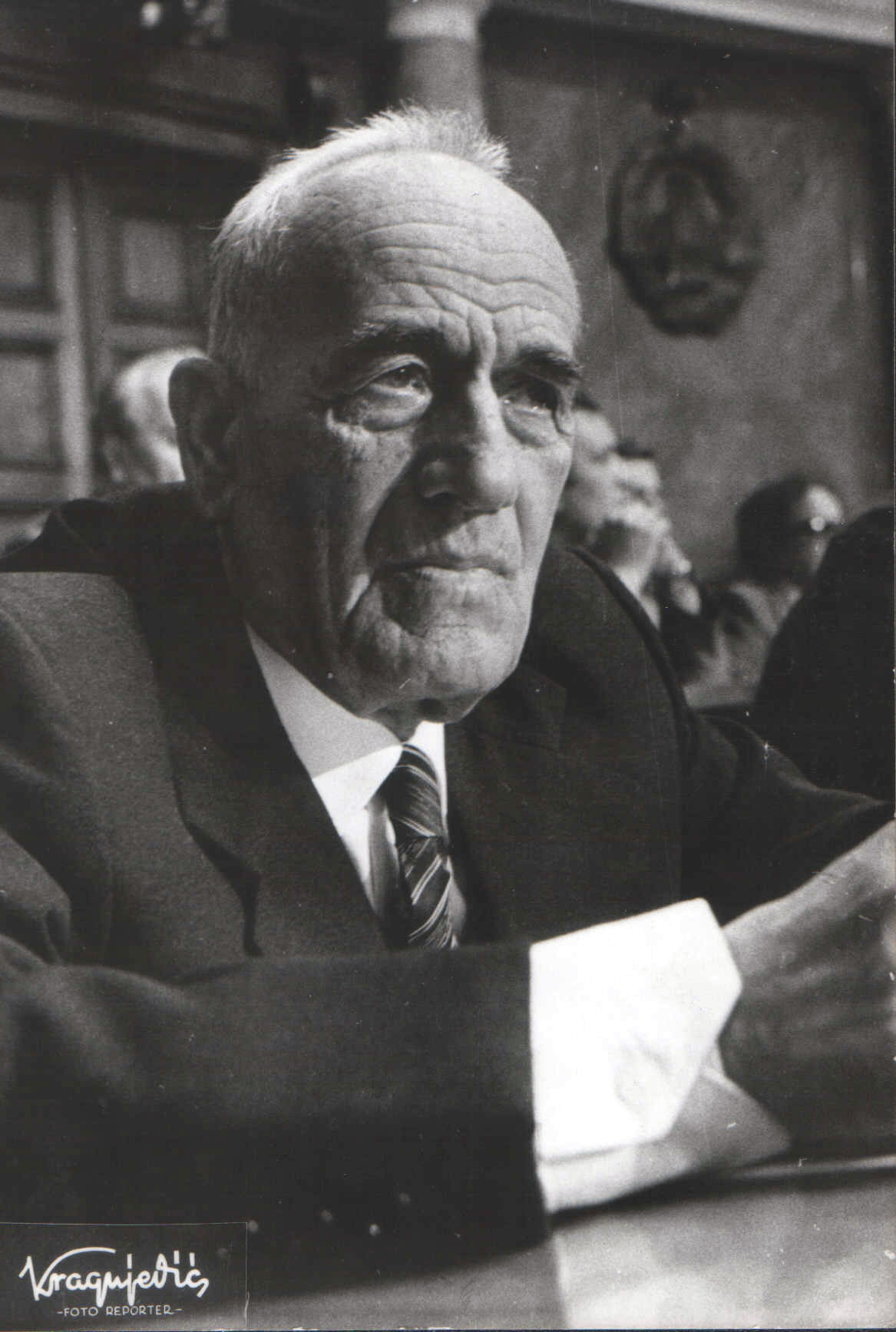
- Born: 7 October 1914; Trepča, Andrijevica, Kingdom of Montenegro
- Died: 30 December 1992 (aged 78); Belgrade, FR Yugoslavia
- Citizenship: Yugoslavian
- Writing career
- Years active: 1948–1992
- Genres: Realism, social realism
- Notable works: Lelejska gora, Hajka, Zlo proljeće
- Notable awards: NIN Award, Njegoš Award

Mihailo Lalić (Serbian Cyrillic: Михаило Лалић, pronounced [mixǎilɔ lâlit͡ɕ]; 7 October 1914 – 30 December 1992) was a Montenegrin and Serbian writer.

== Biography ==
He was born in Trepča (Andrijevica municipality) village in north-eastern Montenegro in 1914. His most important novels are "Svadba", "Zlo proljeće", "Raskid", "Hajka", "Ratna sreća", and his masterpiece, "Lelejska gora".

He won the NIN Award (NIN magazine's prize for the novel of the year) for "Ratna sreća" in 1973, and was the first recipient of "Njegoš Award" for "Lelejska gora". In his novels he depicted major events in modern history of Montenegro, World Wars in particular, and battling between communist Partisans and royalist Chetniks.

He lived in Herceg-Novi and Belgrade and was a member of both the Montenegrin and Serbian Academy of Sciences and Arts, whose vice-president he was. He was also a member of SKOJ and Communist Party. He died in Belgrade in 1992.

== Works ==
=== Short stories ===
- Izvidnica (The Patrol) (1948)
- Prvi snijeg (The First Snow) (1951)
- Na mjesečini (In the Moonlight) (1956)
- Posljednje brdo (The Last Hill) (1967)

=== Novels ===
- Svadba (The Wedding) (1950)
- Zlo proljeće (The Evil Spring) (1953)
- Raskid (Separation) (1955)
- Lelejska gora (The Mountain of Cries) (1957, 1962)
- Hajka (The Pursuit) (1960)
- Pramen tame (The Lock of Darkness) (1970)
- Ratna sreća (The Luck of War) (1973)
- Zatočnici (The Advocates) (1976)
- Dokle gora zazeleni (Until the Mountain Turns Green) (1982)
- Gledajući dolje na drumove (Looking Down on the Roads) (1983)
- Odlučan čovjek (Determined Man) (1990)
