= FK Komovi =

FK Komovi Andrijevica
- Full name: Fudbalski klub Komovi
- Founded: 1934
- Ground: Stadion Prljanije, Andrijevica, Montenegro
- Capacity: 650
- League: Montenegrin Third League (North region)

FK Komovi is a Montenegrin football club from Andrijevica. They currently compete in the Montenegrin Third League.

== History ==
The club was founded in 1934, as FK Radnik. Before World War II, they played only non-league games.
In 1946, the team was refounded and named FK Komovi after the mountain with the same name. Until the seventies, FK Komovi participated in regional competition (fourth-tier) and their first success came at the 1975–76 season. At that season for the first time in history, FK Komovi won the title of the Montenegrin Fourth League champion, gaining promotion to the Montenegrin Republic League. They spent only one season in the Republic League.

New successful time came during the nineties. In 1996, after the hard struggle with neighbouring FK Jezero, the team from Andrijevica won another title in the Fourth League. The last game of the season between FK Jezero and FK Komovi in Plav was remembered by many incidents, followed by numerous wounded spectators and players of the home team.
This time, FK Komovi spent two consecutive seasons in the Montenegrin Republic League. After 13th place in the 1997–98 season, they played relegation playoff games against FK Cetinje, but didn't succeed (1–0; 0–2). That was the last time that FK Komovi played in higher rank.

Following Montenegrin independence, FK Komovi became a part of the Montenegrin Third League - North.

FK Komovi won twice the title of the Northern Region Cup - in 2006 and in 2018, so they played two times in the first stage of the Montenegrin Cup. First time, in the 2006-07 season, FK Komovi won the first-phase game against FK Prvijenac (1–0), but were eliminated in Round of 16, where they met Second-League side FK Zora (1–5; 0-0). Next time, FK Komovi played in the 2018–19 Montenegrin Cup. They were eliminated in the First round by FK Zeta (0–6) and that was the unique occasion when member of Prva CFL played in Andrijevica.

== Honours and achievements ==
- Montenegrin Fourth League – 2
  - winners (2): 1975–76, 1995–96
- Northern Region Cup – 3
  - winners (3): 2006, 2018, 2019

== Current squad ==
Note: Flags indicate national team as defined under FIFA eligibility rules; some limited exceptions apply. Players may hold more than one non-FIFA nationality.

No.	Pos.	Nation	Player
—	GK	MNE	Darko Labović
—	GK	MNE	Gruda
—	DF	MNE	lazar kastratović
—	DF	MNE	Miloš Pepdjonović
—	DF	MNE	Radovan Femič
—	DF	MNE	Risto Mihaljević
—	DF	MNE	Rajko Konjevič
—	MF	MNE	Nikola Barjaktarovic

No.	Pos.	Nation	Player
—	MF	SRB	Igor Marinković
—	MF	MNE	Ervin Peričič
—	MF	MNE	Irvin Mucic
—	MF	MNE	Jokic Ilija
—	FW	SRB	Marko Jovanović
—	FW	SRB	Dragan Radović
—	FW	MNE	Kenan Kalić
—	FW	SRB	Stefan Lekić

== Stadium ==
FK Komovi plays their home games at Stadion Prljanije in Andrijevica. Built in 1975, the stadium was renovated at 2018 with new stand with 650 seats. Before 1975, FK Komovi played their home games in Zlorječica stadium.

== See also ==
- Andrijevica
- Montenegrin Third League
- Montenegrin clubs in Yugoslav football competitions (1946–2006)
