= Luka Vujanović =

Montenegrin footballer

Personal information
- Date of birth: 17 July 1994 (age 32)
- Place of birth: Cetinje, FR Yugoslavia
- Height: 1.75 m (5 ft 9 in)
- Position: Midfielder

Youth career
- Lovćen

Senior career*
Years	Team	Apps	(Gls)
2013–2017	Lovćen	86	(9)
2017–2018	Vojvodina	2	(0)

International career^{‡}
2015	Montenegro U21	1	(0)
- * Club domestic league appearances and goals as of 25 November 2017 ‡ National team caps and goals as of 18 November 2017

Luka Vujanović (Cyrillic: Лука Вујановић; born 17 July 1994 in Cetinje) is a Montenegrin football midfielder who most recently played for Vojvodina.

== Club career ==
=== Lovćen ===
Vujanović started his professional career in his local club Lovćen. Solid displays earned him a call to the U21 national team, for which he debuted in 2015.

=== Vojvodina ===
On 19 July 2017, Vujanović signed a four-year deal with Serbian outfit Vojvodina. On 18 November 2017, Luka made his Serbian SuperLiga debut, appearing in 0:0 home draw against Radnik Surdulica.

== Career statistics ==
As of 25 November 2017

Appearances and goals by club, season and competition
Club	Season	League			Cup		Continental		Other		Total	
Club	Season	Division	Apps	Goals	Apps	Goals	Apps	Goals	Apps	Goals	Apps	Goals
Lovćen	2013–14	Montenegrin First League	13	1	4	1	—		—		17	2
Lovćen	2014–15	Montenegrin First League	24	5	0	0	1	0	—		25	5
Lovćen	2015–16	Montenegrin First League	32	2	4	0	—		—		36	2
Lovćen	2016–17	Montenegrin First League	17	1	1	0	—		—		18	1
Lovćen	Total		86	9	9	1	1	0	—		96	10
Vojvodina	2017–18	SuperLiga	2	0	0	0	—		—		2	0
Vojvodina	Total		2	0	0	0	0	0	—		2	0
Career total			88	9	9	1	1	0	—		98	10

== Honours ==
=== Club ===
Lovćen

- Montenegrin Cup (1): 2013–14
