= Emmanuel Akansase =

Ghanaian footballer (born 2004)

Personal information
- Date of birth: 24 April 2004 (age 22)
- Place of birth: Ghana
- Position: Forward

Team information
- Current team: Besëlidhja Lezhë

Youth career
- Vision

Senior career*
Years	Team	Apps	(Gls)
2023	Vision	11	(3)
2024–	SJK Akatemia	15	(6)
2024–	SJK Akatemia II	13	(8)
2025	→ Vision (loan)	8	(2)
2025–	Besëlidhja Lezhë	19	(13)
- * Club domestic league appearances and goals as of 1 May 2025

Emmanuel Akansase (born 24 April 2004) is a Ghanaian professional footballer who plays as forward for Kategoria e Dytë club Besëlidhja Lezhë.
