= Dražen Međedović =

Montenegrin footballer

Personal information
- Full name: Dražen Međedović
- Date of birth: 15 October 1982 (age 44)
- Place of birth: Nikšić, SFR Yugoslavia
- Height: 1.81 m (5 ft 11 1/2 in)
- Position: Attacking midfielder

Senior career*
Years	Team	Apps	(Gls)
1999–2007	Sutjeska	153	(12)
2006	→ Budućnost (loan)	20	(0)
2007–2008	Mogren	8	(0)
2008	→ Bokelj (loan)	12	(1)
2008–2011	Sutjeska	66	(13)
2011	Borac Banja Luka	13	(0)
2011	Čelik Nikšić	13	(2)
2013–2014	Grbalj	27	(0)

Managerial career
- 2022—: Čelik Nikšić
- * Club domestic league appearances and goals as of 23 July 2019

Dražen Međedović (Cyrillic: Дражен Међедовић; born 15 October 1982) is a Montenegrin football manager and former player who played as an attacking midfielder. He is manager of Čelik Nikšić.

== Club career ==
=== Sutjeska Nikšić ===
Međedović made his professional debut with Sutjeska Nikšić in the 1999-2000 season, after which he played seven consecutive seasons for Sutjeska. He scored in the 2007 Montenegrin Cup final against Rudar Pljevlja, although Sutjeska ended up losing. He was loaned to Budućnost in 2006, after which he was transferred to Mogren.

=== Return to Sutjeska ===
Upon returning to his hometown club, Međedović featured in Sutjeska's 2009-10 UEFA Europa League qualifying campaign. In the first qualifying round, Sutjeska was drawn with MTZ-RIPO, and Međedović scored a goal in the first leg played in Nikšić.

=== Borac Banja Luka ===
Međedović joined Borac Banja Luka in 2011. He played in a friendly match with Red Star Belgrade on 20 February 2011, which Borac lost by a score of 2–1.

=== Čelik Nikšić ===
After spending a brief half-season with Borac Banja Luka, Međedović signed a short 6-month contract with ambitious Montenegrin side FK Čelik Nikšić. After appearing in thirteen matches, he did not extend his contract despite impressing the management of the club and considered to retire from football.

== Career statistics ==
Club	Season	League		Cup		Europe		Total
Club	Season	App	Goals	App	Goals	App	Goals	App	Goals
FK Sutjeska Nikšić	1999–00	18	0	0	0	0	0	18	0
FK Sutjeska Nikšić	2000–01	20	1	0	0	0	0	20	1
FK Sutjeska Nikšić	2001–02	30	1	0	0	0	0	30	1
FK Sutjeska Nikšić	2002–03	24	0	0	0	0	0	24	0
FK Sutjeska Nikšić	2003–04	17	3	0	0	0	0	17	3
FK Sutjeska Nikšić	2004–05	20	3	0	0	0	0	20	3
FK Budućnost	2005–06	20	0	0	0	0	0	20	0
FK Sutjeska Nikšić	2006-07	24	4	1	1	0	0	25	5
FK Mogren	2007–08	8	0	0	0	0	0	8	0
FK Bokelj	2007–08	12	1	0	0	0	0	12	1
FK Sutjeska Nikšić	2008–09	29	5	0	0	0	0	29	5
FK Sutjeska Nikšić	2009–10	27	4	0	0	1	1	28	5
FK Sutjeska Nikšić	2010–11	13	4	0	0	0	0	13	4
FK Borac Banja Luka	2010–11	13	0	0	0	0	0	13	0
FK Čelik Nikšić	2011–12	13	2	0	0	0	0	13	2
OFK Grbalj	2012–13	6	0	0	0	0	0	6	0
OFK Grbalj	2013–14	21	0	0	0	0	0	21	0

== Personal life ==
His father Miodrag Međedović also played for Sutjeska.
