= Salim Yussif =

Ghanaian footballer (born 2002)

Personal information
- Full name: Salim Giabo Yussif
- Date of birth: 6 June 2002 (age 24)
- Place of birth: Ghana
- Position: Central midfielder

Team information
- Current team: SJK
- Number: 6

Youth career
- Vision
- Black Rock Academy

College career
Years	Team	Apps	(Gls)
2021–2023	AIC Yellow Jackets	24	(7)

Senior career*
Years	Team	Apps	(Gls)
2023	Vision		
2023	→ SJK II (loan)	17	(1)
2024–	SJK	62	(1)
2024	SJK II	2	(0)
- * Club domestic league appearances and goals as of 13 November 2026

Salim Giabo Yussif (born 6 June 2002) is a Ghanaian professional footballer who plays as a central midfielder for Veikkausliiga club SJK.
