= Tomislav Ćiraković =

Montenegrin footballer

Personal information
- Full name: Tomislav Ćiraković
- Date of birth: 10 October 1984 (age 42)
- Place of birth: Kotor, SFR Yugoslavia
- Height: 1.80 m (5 ft 11 in)
- Position: Midfielder

Senior career*
| Years | Team | Apps | (Gls) |
| 2004–2012 | Sutjeska | 91+ | (4+) |
| 2013–2014 | Igalo | 25 | (1) |
| 2015–2016 | Čelik Nikšić | 0 | (0) |
- * Club domestic league appearances and goals as of 12 February 2015

Tomislav Ćiraković (born 10 October 1984) is a Montenegrin retired footballer who last played for FK Čelik Nikšić.

== Club career ==
He also used to play for OFK Igalo, FK Čelik, before joining Sutjeska to play in the First League of Serbia and Montenegro during the 2004–05 season.
