= Darko Isidorović =

Serbian footballer

Personal information
- Full name: Darko Isidorović
- Date of birth: 17 April 1987 (age 39)
- Place of birth: Valjevo, SFR Yugoslavia
- Height: 1.80 m (5 ft 11 in)
- Position: Forward

Youth career
- Zemun

Senior career*
Years	Team	Apps	(Gls)
2005–2007	Zemun	20	(2)
2005	→ Radnički Nova Pazova (loan)	11	(4)
2006	→ Radnički Nova Pazova (loan)	10	(2)
2007	→ Milutinac Zemun (loan)	13	(3)
2007–2009	Bežanija	21	(1)
2008–2009	→ Radnički Nova Pazova (loan)	7	(3)
2009–2011	Inđija	46	(10)
2011–2012	Metalac Gornji Milanovac	20	(1)
2012–2014	Sutjeska Nikšić	45	(12)
2014–2015	Jedinstvo Užice	25	(3)
2015	Inđija	9	(0)
2016	Bokelj		
2016–2018	Budućnost Krušik 2014		
2019–2020	Mladost Dračić		
- * Club domestic league appearances and goals as of 9 January 2016

Darko Isidorović (Serbian Cyrillic: Дарко Исидоровић; born 17 April 1987) is a Serbian retired footballer who played as a forward.

== Honours ==
Sutjeska Nikšić

- Montenegrin First League: 2012–13, 2013–14
