= Petar Kasom =

Montenegrin footballer

Personal information
- Full name: Petar Kasom
- Date of birth: 21 December 1981 (age 44)
- Place of birth: Cetinje, SFR Yugoslavia
- Height: 1.77 m (5 ft 9 1/2 in)
- Position: Forward

Youth career
- Partizan

Senior career*
Years	Team	Apps	(Gls)
1998–2002	Partizan	1	(0)
2000–2002	→ Teleoptik (loan)	47	(17)
2002–2006	Budućnost Banatski Dvor	35	(7)
2004	→ Bečej (loan)	11	(1)
2006	Smederevo	15	(1)
2007	AEP Paphos	8	(?)
2007–2008	Smederevo	24	(1)
2009–2010	Grbalj	18	(2)
- * Club domestic league appearances and goals

Petar Kasom (Serbian Cyrillic: Петар Касом, born 21 December 1981) is a Montenegrin retired football striker.

== Club career ==
Born in Cetinje (SR Montenegro, SFR Yugoslavia), Kasom started playing in the youth teams of Serbian giants FK Partizan where he spent eight years. In 2002, after playing two seasons on loan with Partizan's satellite club FK Teleoptik, he signed with FK Budućnost Banatski Dvor. He played the second half of the 2003–04 season on loan at FK Bečej. In 2006, he moved to another Serbian top flight club FK Smederevo where he would stay until summer 2008, with the exception the half season he spent in Cyprus playing with the Cypriot First Division side AEP Paphos in the second half of the 2006–07 season. In 2009, he joined Montenegrin First League side OFK Grbalj where he played during the 2009–10 season.
