= Alex Yamoah =

Ghanaian footballer (born 1995)

Personal information
- Date of birth: 10 January 1995 (age 31)
- Position: Midfielder

Team information
- Current team: Zeta
- Number: 90

Youth career
- –2017: Vision

Senior career*
Years	Team	Apps	(Gls)
2017–2018	Veria	10	(0)
2018–	Zeta	57	(9)
- * Club domestic league appearances and goals as of 30 October 2020

Alex Yamoah (born 10 January 1995) is a Ghanaian footballer who currently plays as a midfielder for FK Zeta.

== Career statistics ==
=== Club ===
As of 17 October 2018.

Club	Season	League			Cup		Continental		Other		Total	
Club	Season	Division	Apps	Goals	Apps	Goals	Apps	Goals	Apps	Goals	Apps	Goals
Veria	2017–18	Football League	10	0	0	0	–		0	0	10	0
FK Zeta	2018–19	Montenegrin First League	10	1	1 (Note: Appearances in the Montenegrin Cup)	0	–		0	0	11	1
Career total			20	1	1	0	0	0	0	0	21	1
