= Milan Mešter =

Montenegrin footballer

Personal information
- Full name: Milan Mešter
- Date of birth: 23 October 1975 (age 51)
- Place of birth: Titograd, SFR Yugoslavia
- Height: 1.78 m (5 ft 10 in)
- Position: Attacking midfielder

Senior career*
Years	Team	Apps	(Gls)
- Iskra
1997-1998	Budućnost	6	(0)
1998–1999	Mogren	23	(2)
1999–2000	Panachaiki	22	(1)
2000	Patraikos		
2001–2003	Hajduk Kula	75	(21)
2003	Ningbo Yaoma		
2004–2006	Zemun	48	(5)
2005	→ Zeta (loan)	26	(2)
2007	Mogren	13	(1)
2007–2009	Lovćen	62	(8)
2009–2010	Mornar	31	(2)
Total		277	(40)

Managerial career
- 2013–2014: Kom
- * Club domestic league appearances and goals

Milan Mešter (Cyrillic: Милан Мештер; born 23 October 1975) is a Montenegrin former professional footballer who played as an attacking midfielder.

== Club career ==
After playing for Mogren in the 1998–99 First League of FR Yugoslavia, Mešter moved abroad to Greece and signed a contract with Panachaiki. He appeared in 22 matches and scored once during the 1999–2000 Alpha Ethniki. In the 2001 winter transfer window, Mešter returned to FR Yugoslavia and joined Hajduk Kula. He made 75 appearances and netted 21 goals for the club in the top flight over the next two and a half years. In the summer of 2003, Mešter moved abroad for the second time and joined Chinese club Ningbo Yaoma. He spent half a season in Asia, before returning to Serbia and Montenegro and signing with Zemun.
