= Joseph Cudjoe (footballer) =

Ghanaian footballer

Personal information
- Date of birth: 17 October 1995 (age 31)
- Place of birth: Takoradi, Ghana
- Height: 1.67 m (5 ft 6 in)
- Position: Midfielder

Team information
- Current team: Medeama

Youth career
- Red Bull Ghana

Senior career*
Years	Team	Apps	(Gls)
2009–2013	Red Bull Ghana		
2013	Vision		
2014–2015	Radnik Surdulica	5	(1)
2014	→ Radnički Kragujevac (loan)	3	(0)
2015–2019	Vision		
2020–	Medeama		
- * Club domestic league appearances and goals

Joseph Cudjoe (born 17 October 1995) is a Ghanaian footballer who plays as a midfielder for Medeama SC.

== Career ==
Born in Takoradi, Joseph "Success" Cudjoe played with Red Bull Ghana U-17 side in the "Next Generation Trophy 2010" held in Salzburg, Austria. In 2011 he became part of the main team of Red Bull. He also played with Vision F.C. in Ghana.

During the winter break of the 2013–14 season, he was brought by Serbian First League side Radnik Surdulica. In summer 2014 player was loaned to Serbian SuperLiga side FK Radnički 1923 and returned in Winter 2014 to Radnik Surdulica. After his releasing by Surdulica, in summer 2015 signed 2nd time for Vision F.C. He played for the club until the end of 2019, where he joined Medeama SC on a two-year deal.

== Honours ==
Radnik Surdulica

- Serbian First League: 2014–15
