= Dušan Nestorović =

Serbian footballer

Personal information
- Full name: Dušan Nestorović
- Date of birth: June 26, 1986 (age 40)
- Place of birth: Prijepolje, SFR Yugoslavia
- Height: 1.80 m (5 ft 11 in)
- Position: Defender

Senior career*
Years	Team	Apps	(Gls)
2004–2006	Polimlje Prijepolje		
2006–2009	Rudar Pljevlja	30	(2)
2009–2013	Vojvodina	13	(0)
2009	→ Slavija Sarajevo (loan)	4	(0)
2011–2017	Rudar Pljevlja	154	(3)
2017–2018	Dečić	50	(0)
2019	FAP Priboj		
- * Club domestic league appearances and goals as of 17:20, 26 May 2019 (UTC)

Dušan Nestorović (Serbian Cyrillic: Душaн Hecтopoвић; born June 26, 1986) is a Serbian retired footballer.

He was born in Prijepolje, southwestern Serbia. Previously he played for his home town club FK Polimlje, Montenegrin First League club FK Rudar Pljevlja and Serbian SuperLiga side FK Vojvodina.

== Career ==
On 11 February 2019, FK FAP Priboj confirmed on their Facebook site, that they had signed Nestorović.

== External sources ==
- Dušan Nestorović at Soccerway (archived)
- Profile at Srbijafudbal.
- Dušan Nestorović at Utakmica.rs (in Serbian)
