= Gojko Žižić =

Montenegrin footballer

Personal information
- Full name: Gojko Žižić
- Date of birth: 27 January 1989 (age 37)
- Place of birth: Titograd, SFR Yugoslavia
- Height: 1.86 m (6 ft 1 in)
- Position: Centre-back

Senior career*
Years	Team	Apps	(Gls)
–2009	Crvena Stijena	86	(18)
2009	OFK Beograd	0	(0)
2009	→ Kom (loan)	16	(0)
2009	Berane	15	(1)
2010	Dečić	12	(0)
2011	Čukarički	13	(0)
2011	Metalac Gornji Milanovac	0	(0)
2012	Sutjeska Nikšić	5	(0)
2012	Lovćen	8	(0)
2013	Banat Zrenjanin	16	(0)
2014	Olympic Azzaweya	26	(3)
2014-2015	Jedinstvo Bijelo Polje		
2016–xxxx	Crvena Stijena		

International career
- Montenegro U19
- * Club domestic league appearances and goals as of 24 October 2014

Gojko Žižić (Serbian Cyrillic: Гојко Жижић; born 21 January 1989) is a Montenegrin football defender.
