= Miloš Kalezić =

Montenegrin footballer

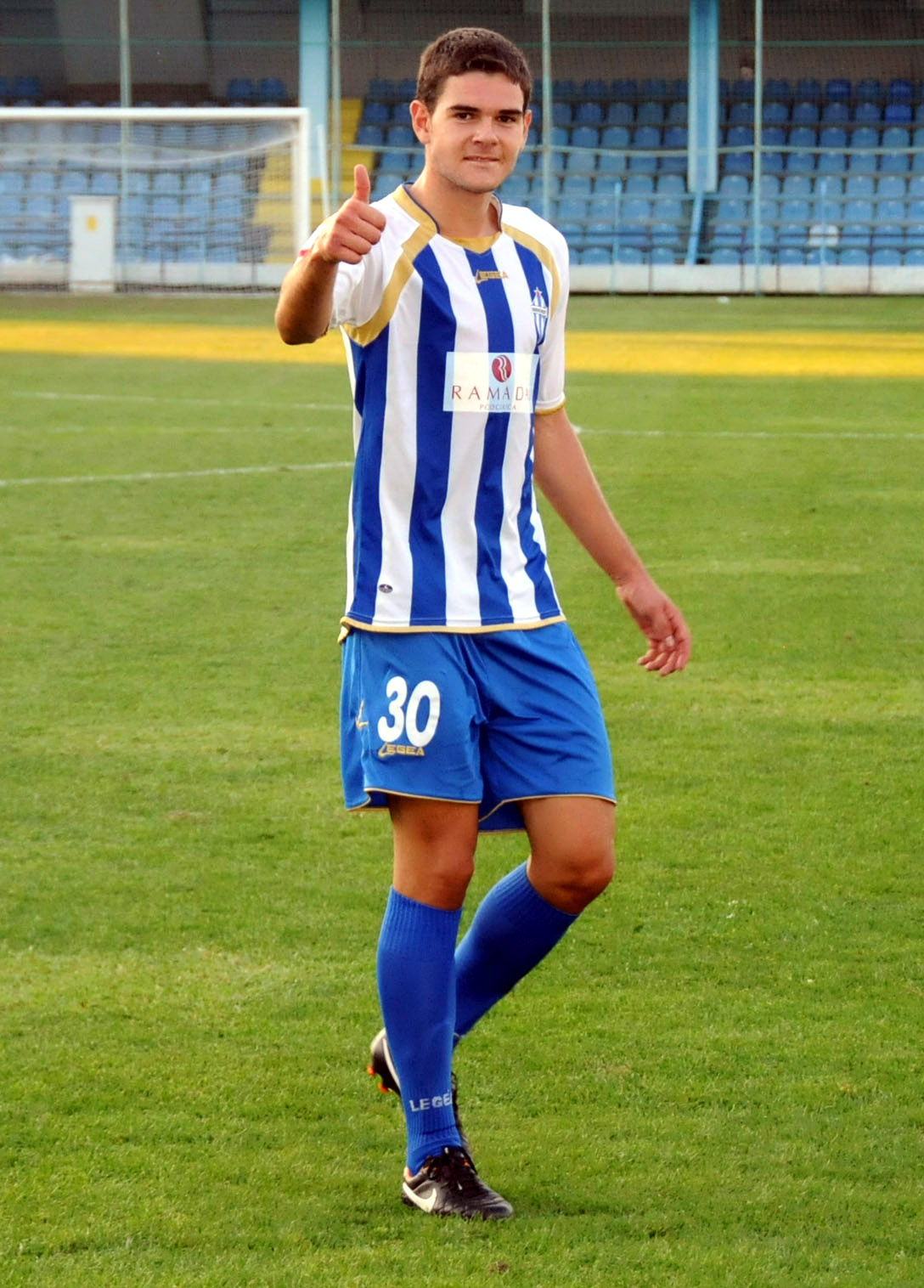
- Milos Kalezic for FK Buducnost

Personal information
- Date of birth: 9 August 1993 (age 33)
- Place of birth: Podgorica, Montenegro
- Height: 1.86 m (6 ft 1 in)
- Position: Midfielder

Team information
- Current team: Ibar
- Number: 8

Youth career
- 2005–2010: Budućnost Podgorica

Senior career*
Years	Team	Apps	(Gls)
2010–2013	Budućnost Podgorica	58	(6)
2013–2014	Mogren	27	(3)
2014–2015	Grbalj	3	(0)
2014–2015	Šamorín	9	(1)
2015–2017	Iskra	46	(5)
2017	Sloboda Tuzla	17	(2)
2018–2020	Petrovac	78	(14)
2020–2021	OFK Titograd	17	(1)
2021	Vllaznia Shkodër	11	(0)
2021–2022	Novi Pazar	10	(0)
2022	Sutjeska Nikšić	12	(0)
2023–2024	Iskra	63	(6)
2025–	Ibar	7	(0)

International career
	Montenegro U-17	10	(0)
	Montenegro U-19	14	(0)
	Montenegro U-21	4	(0)
- * Club domestic league appearances and goals as of 8 April 2025

Miloš Kalezić (born 9 August 1993) is a Montenegrin footballer who plays as a midfielder for Ibar.

== Club career ==
After playing semi-professional football in Montenegro and Slovakia, Kalezić joined FK Sloboda Tuzla where he played in the Premier League of Bosnia and Herzegovina.

== Honours ==
Budućnost Podgorica

- Montenegrin First League: 2011–12
- Montenegrin Cup: 2012–13
