= Stadion Cvijetin Brijeg =

Football stadium in Podgorica, Montenegro

Coordinates: 42°26′18.3″N 19°16′17.5″E

Cvijetni Brijeg Stadium was a football stadium in the neighbourhood of Drač in Podgorica, Montenegro. It used to be the home stadium of FK Mladost Podgorica. The stadium was rebuilt in 1997. The inaugural match, played in August, was FK Mladost against FK Cetinje. The capacity of the stadium was 1,500 (all-seated).

Since 2008, FK Mladost moved to Stari Aerodrom neighbourhood where occupies 9000 square meters of FSCG campus. On the location of the old stadium, "21. maj" Elementary School was built.
