= Stadion Prljanije =

Stadium in Andrijevica, Montenegro

- Interactive map of Stadion Prljanije
- Full name: Stadion Prljanije
- Location: Andrijevica, Montenegro
- Coordinates: 42.737779°N 19.792431°E
- Owner: Municipality of Andrijevica
- Capacity: 650
- Surface: grass
- Field size: 110x70

Construction
- Built: 1975
- Renovated: 2018

Tenant
- FK Komovi

Stadion Prljanije is a football stadium in Andrijevica, Montenegro. Situated in the valley of Lim river, it is used for football matches. It is the home ground of FK Komovi.

== History ==
In the early history, FK Komovi played their home games in Zlorječica stadium. In 1975, following the team's progress in the Fourth League competition, a new stadium was built at location Prljanije. The stadium was renovated at 2018, when the new stand is built, with a capacity of 650 seats.

== Pitch and conditions ==
The pitch measures 110 x 70 meters. Stadium meets criteria only for Montenegrin Third League games, not for highest-rank competitions.

== See also ==
- FK Komovi
- Andrijevica
