= Nikola Vukčević (footballer, born 1984) =

Montenegrin footballer

Personal information
- Date of birth: 22 March 1984 (age 42)
- Place of birth: Titograd, SFR Yugoslavia
- Height: 1.87 m (6 ft 1 1/2 in)
- Position: Centre-back

Senior career*
Years	Team	Apps	(Gls)
2003–2011	Budućnost Podgorica	131	(10)
2006–2007	→ Vllaznia Shkodër (loan)	24	(2)
2011–2012	Ethnikos Achna	29	(1)
2012–2013	Kazma		
2013	Lovćen	11	(0)
2014	Vllaznia Shkodër	13	(1)
2014	Lovćen	12	(2)
2015	Shkëndija	7	(0)
2015	Inđija	12	(1)
2016–2017	Budućnost Podgorica	40	(2)
2017	Mladost	14	(0)
2018–2019	Lokomotiva Beograd		

International career
2009	Montenegro	1	(0)
- * Club domestic league appearances and goals

Nikola Vukčević (born 22 March 1984) is a Montenegrin retired footballer who played as a defender.

== International career ==
Vukčević made his debut for Montenegro in a November 2009 friendly match against Belarus, coming on as a final minute substitute for Miodrag Džudović. It remained his sole international appearance.
