= Luka Merdović =

Montenegrin footballer

Personal information
- Full name: Luka Merdović
- Date of birth: 14 March 1989 (age 37)
- Place of birth: Titograd, SFR Yugoslavia
- Height: 1.80 m (5 ft 11 in)
- Position: Forward

Senior career*
Years	Team	Apps	(Gls)
2007–2009	Budućnost Podgorica		
2008–2009	→ Mornar Bar (loan)		
2009	Mladost Podgorica		
2010	Sutjeska Nikšić	16	(5)
2010	OFK Beograd	3	(0)
2011–2012	→ Mladost Podgorica (loan)	32	(9)
2012–2013	Grbalj	27	(2)
2013–2014	Lovćen	29	(6)
2014–2016	Metalac Gornji Milanovac	62	(14)
2016	Radnik Surdulica	7	(1)
2017	Agrotikos Asteras	15	(0)
2017–2019	Sutjeska Nikšić	51	(13)
2019–2020	OFK Titograd	14	(3)
2020–2021	OFK Petrovac	3	(0)
- * Club domestic league appearances and goals as of 06:47, 21 June 2022 (UTC)

Luka Merdović (Cyrillic: Лукa Mepдoвић; born 14 March 1989) is a Montenegrin football forward.

== Club career ==
He had played with Montenegrin clubs FK Budućnost Podgorica, FK Mornar, FK Mladost Podgorica and FK Sutjeska Nikšić before moving to OFK Beograd where he played the first half of the 2010-11 Serbian SuperLiga season. During the winter break he returned to Mladost to play in the Montenegrin First League.

In 2017 he played for Greek side Agrotikos Asteras.

== Honours ==
Lovćen

- Montenegrin Cup: 2014

== External sources ==
- Luka Merdović at Srbijafudbal.com (in Serbian)
