= Andrijevica =

Town and municipality in Northern Montenegro

Andrijevica Андријевица
- Town and municipality
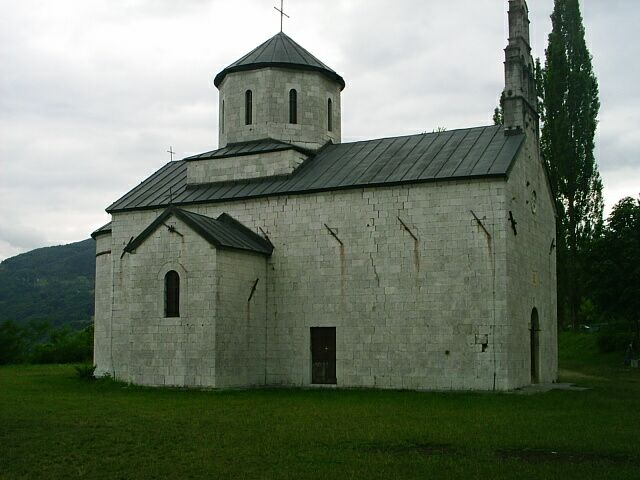
- Church in Andrijevica

- Coat of arms

- Location of Andrijevica
- Coordinates: 42.73°N 19.79°E
- Country: Montenegro
- Region: Northern
- Municipality: Andrijevica

Government
  - Type: Mayor-Assembly
  - Mayor: Željko Ćulafić (SNP)

Population (2023 census)
  - Rank: 22nd in Montenegro
  - Urban: 988 ▼
  - Rural: 2,990 ▼
  - Municipality: 3,978 ▼
- Time zone: UTC+1 (CET)
  - Summer (DST): UTC+2 (CEST)
- Postal code: 84320
- Vehicle registration: AN
- Climate: Cfb

Andrijevica (Montenegrin Cyrillic: Андријевица, pronounced [andrǐjɛv̞it͡sa]) is a town in Montenegro in the Northern Region and it is the seat of Andrijevica Municipality. According to the 2023 Census of Montenegro, it had a population of 988.

== Name ==
The town is named after Andrija, a descendant of the Nemanjić dynasty.

== History ==
The town developed in the 19th century.

Archaeological research of the Institute for monuments protection from Cetinje in 1956 discovered that traces of material culture from the Neolithic period exist in Berane valley. In addition, traces of Illyrian culture were also found, so it can be assumed that the environment of Andrijevica was an ecumenical space of numerous groups of people. Remainders of Roman settlements are also present in Berane valley, as well as in the vicinity of Andrijevica.

During the Middle Ages, the fort of Grace existed, 1 km from today's town of Andrijevica. The fort was probably guarding the road along the Lim River, which was part of the main road network between the regions of Raška and Zeta. This period saw emergence of a number of smaller villages and settlements, all of which predate the town of Andrijevica.

During the rule of House of Nemanjić, it was noted that the area of Andrijevica was densely populated with Orthodox Christian population. In the Nemanjić era, the center of the area was Budim grad, some 15 km from today's town. A descendant of the Nemanjić house, Andrija, built a church called Andrijevina, which was razed by the Ottomans in 1765.

In the nineteenth century, the warrior tribe of Vasojevići, which was frequently rebelling against Ottoman rule, began forming a settlement around the new church of Andrijevina, which would eventually become Andrijevica. In 1858, Vasojević Duke Miljan Vukov proclaimed the Vasojevići region a part of Montenegro.

From that point, the settlement gradually expanded into a town, but World War I interrupted its development. Andrijevica was the center of the county (Okrug) from 1918 to 1921, and the inter-war period was a time of rapid development for the town.

In July 1944, the German SS Skanderbeg division massacred more than 400 Orthodox Christian civilians in the town. After World War II, the town was first the seat of the district (srez), and then of municipality (opština) until 1960. Andrijevica was restored with municipality status in 1991.

The economy of Andrijevica was struck heavily by the decline of industry during the Yugoslav Wars, hence the population of the municipality declined slowly but steadily.

== Demographics ==
According to the 1948 census, the town had 10,058 inhabitants. Since then, the town's population has gradually declined. In 1953, there were 10,267 inhabitants, in 1961 there were 9,791, in 1971 9,299, in 1981 7,488, in 1991 6,696. The 2003 census listed 5,785 inhabitants. The 2011 census registered 1,048 inhabitants.

According to the 2023 census, Andrijevica had 988 inhabitants.

Ethnicity	Number	Percentage
Serbs	643	61.35%
Montenegrins	350	33.39%
other/undeclared	55	5.26%
Total	1,048	100%

== Sports ==
The local football team is FK Komovi, who have spent recent seasons in the country's third tier. They play their home games at the Stadion Prljanije. The town's handball team is RK Komovi.

== Notable people ==
- Čedo Vuković (1920–2014), Montenegrin novelist and writer.
- Mihailo Lalić (1914–1992), Montenegrin and Serbian novelist and recipient of the NIN Award.
- Milija Pavićević (1943–2011), physician, neuropsychiatrist, Doctor of Medical Sciences, primarius, and professor and professor.
- Milija and Pavle Bakić, brothers from the Andrijevica area who co-founded the Turkish football club Galatasaray in 1905.
- Puniša Račić (1886–1944), Serbian politician known for the 1928 shooting of Croatian deputies in the Yugoslav parliament.
