= Marko Đurović =

Montenegrin footballer

Marko Djurovic
Personal information
- Date of birth: 8 May 1988 (age 38)
- Place of birth: Montenegro
- Position: Forward

Senior career*
Years	Team	Apps	(Gls)
2007-2010	Lovćen	47	(11)
2010	Sheriff Tiraspol	15	(2)
2011-2014	Mogren	53	(13)
2014-2015	Lovćen	26	(7)
2015	Mladost Velika Obarska		
2016	Mornar	14	(3)
2016-2017	Lovćen	29	(9)
2017-2018	Akzhayik	8	(2)
2018-2019	Lovćen	23	(3)
- * Club domestic league appearances and goals as of 28 August 2020

Marko Djurović (Russian: Марко Джурович; born 2 May 1988 in Montenegro) is a Montenegrin footballer who last played for FK Lovćen in his home country.

== Club career ==
Djurović started his senior career with FK Lovćen. In 2010, he signed for Sheriff Tiraspol in the Moldovan National Division, where he made over eighteen appearances and scored two goals. After that, he played for FK Mogren, FK Mladost Velika Obarska, FK Mornar and Kazkhstan side Akzhayik.
