= Aljbino Camaj =

Montenegrin footballer (born 1979)

Albin Camaj
Personal information
- Full name: Albin Camaj
- Date of birth: 29 September 1979 (age 47)
- Place of birth: Titograd, SFR Yugoslavia
- Height: 1.77 m (5 ft 10 in)
- Position: Forward

Senior career*
Years	Team	Apps	(Gls)
1996–2003	Budućnost Podgorica	65	(3)
2003–2004	Kom Podgorica		
2006–2010	Dečić		
- * Club domestic league appearances and goals as of 5 November 2009

Albin Camaj (Cyrillic: Aљбин Цaмaj, Albanian: Albin Camaj) (born 29 September 1979) is a Montenegrin retired footballer who last played for FK Dečić.

== Club career ==
Camaj played for FK Budućnost Podgorica and FK Kom in the First League of Serbia and Montenegro.
