= 2012–13 Montenegrin Cup =

Tournament details
- Country: Montenegro
- Teams: 30

Final positions
- Champions: Budućnost (1st title)
- Runners-up: Čelik

Tournament statistics
- Matches played: 43
- Goals scored: 127 (2.95 per match)

The 2012–13 Montenegrin Cup was the seventh season of the Montenegrin knockout football tournament. The winner of the tournament received a berth in the first qualifying round of the 2013–14 UEFA Europa League. The defending champions were Čelik, who beat Rudar in the final of the 2011–12 competition. The competition featured 30 teams. It will start on 19 September 2012 and end with the final on 22 May 2013.

== First round ==
The 14 matches in this round will be played on 18 and 19 September 2012.

=== Summary ===
Team 1	Score	Team 2
Iskra	1–7	Mogren
Jezero	0–2	Lovćen
Cetinje	1–4	Mornar
Petrovac	3–0	Bokelj
Mladost	6–0	Ibar
Jedinstvo	1–1 (4–1 p)	Zabjelo
Tekstilac	0–6	Sutjeska
Budućnost	3–0	Bratstvo
Grbalj	6–0	Dečić
Zeta	3–2	Zora
Sloga Radovići	1–3	Pljevlja
Gorštak	1–0	Bar
Igalo	3–1	Arsenal
Kom	1–2	Berane
Čelik	bye	
Rudar	bye	

=== Matches ===
18 September 2012	Tekstilac	0–6	Sutjeska	Bijelo Polje
16:00 CEST		Report	Poček; Šušnjar; Ćuković; D. Karadžić; Čolaković	Stadium: Gradski stadion Referee: Boban Živaljević

19 September 2012	Iskra	1–7	Mogren	Ljajkovići
16:00 CEST				Stadium: Stadion Ljajkovići; Referee: Miloš Novović

19 September 2012	Jezero	0–2	Lovćen	Plav
16:00 CEST				Stadium: Stadion Pod Racinom; Referee: Dragan Mijušković

19 September 2012	Cetinje	1–4	Mornar	Cetinje
16:00 CEST				Stadium: Stadion Obilića poljana Referee: Đorđije Ćalić

19 September 2012	Petrovac	3–0	Bokelj	Petrovac
16:00 CEST				Stadium: Stadion pod Malim brdom Referee: Ranko Spasojević

19 September 2012	Mladost	6–0	Ibar	Podgorica
16:00 CEST				Stadium: Mladost Stadium; Referee: Dražen Petrić

19 September 2012	Jedinstvo	1–1 (4–1 p)	Zabjelo	Bijelo Polje
16:00 CEST	Suma 90+4'		Nenadović 40'	Stadium: Gradski stadion Referee: Miloš Nedić

19 September 2012	Budućnost	3–0	Bratstvo	Podgorica
16:00 CEST	Bošković 15', 25', 69'	Report		Stadium: Podgorica City Stadium; Referee: Milovan Milačić

19 September 2012	Grbalj	6–0	Dečić	Radanovići
16:00 CEST				Stadium: Stadion Donja Sutvara; Referee: Vojin Vojinović

19 September 2012	Zeta	3–2	Zora	Golubovci
16:00 CEST	Boljević; Korać; Cavnić		Vlahović; Pajović (pen.)	Stadium: Stadion Trešnjica; Referee: Vladan Kojović

19 September 2012	Sloga Radovići	1–3	Pljevlja	Radovići
16:00 CEST	Junčaj 52'	Report	Anđelić 15'; Pajević 29'; Bambur 43'	Stadium: Stadion Krtoli; Attendance: 200; Referee: Luka Radulović

19 September 2012	Gorštak	1–0	Bar	Kolašin
16:00 CEST				Stadium: Stadion u Lugu; Referee: Marko Ćupić

19 September 2012	Igalo	3–1	Arsenal	Igalo
16:00 CEST				Stadium: Stadion Solila; Referee: Željko Babović

19 September 2012	Kom	1–2	Berane	Podgorica
16:00 CEST				Stadium: Stadion Zlatica; Referee: Milosav Dragović

== Second round ==
The 14 winners from the first round and last year's cup finalists, Čelik and Rudar, compete in this round. Starting with this round, all rounds of the competition will be two-legged except for the final. The first legs were held on 3 October 2012, while the second legs were held on 24 October 2012.

=== Summary ===
Team 1	Agg.	Team 2	1st leg	2nd leg
Pljevlja	2–12	Mladost	1–2	1–10
Petrovac	4–0	Mogren	4–0	0–0
Budućnost	3–1	Jedinstvo	2–1	1–0
Zeta	1–0	Sutjeska	1–0	0–0
Grbalj	5–0	Gorštak	2–0	3–0
Mornar	6–1	Berane	4–0	2–1
Igalo	1–6	Lovćen	1–1	0–5
Rudar	1–2	Čelik	1–1	0–1

=== First legs ===
2 October 2012	Pljevlja	1–2	Mladost	Pljevlja
15:00 CEST	Bambur 39'	Report	Adžović 6'; Tomić 12'	Stadium: Gradski stadion Attendance: 300; Referee: Miraš Cerović

3 October 2012	Petrovac	4–0	Mogren	Petrovac
15:00 CEST	Đukić 13' (pen.); Leverda 50'; Gazivoda 58'; Jovanović 69'	Report		Stadium: Stadion pod Malim brdom Referee: Radoje Pajović

3 October 2012	Rudar	1–1	Čelik	Pljevlja
15:00 CEST	Igumanović 6'	Report	Zorić 90'	Stadium: Gradski stadion Referee: Mileta Šćepanović

3 October 2012	Budućnost	2–1	Jedinstvo	Podgorica
15:00 CEST	Mugoša 57'; Vukčević 69'	Report	Boričić 11'	Stadium: Podgorica City Stadium; Referee: Saša Rašović

3 October 2012	Grbalj	2–0	Gorštak	Radanovići
15:00 CEST	Nikolić 3', 23'	Report		Stadium: Stadion Donja Sutvara; Referee: Nikola Vođević

3 October 2012	Zeta	1–0	Sutjeska	Golubovci
15:00 CEST	Krstović 70'	Report		Stadium: Stadion Trešnjica; Referee: Aleksandar Marković

3 October 2012	Mornar	4–0	Berane	Bar
15:00 CEST	Ćulafić 28'; Marković 41'; Sekulić 57', 84' (pen.)	Report		Stadium: Stadion Topolica; Referee: Darko Kovačević

3 October 2012	Igalo	1–1	Lovćen	Igalo
15:00 CEST	Koprivica 14'	Report	Turković 30' (pen.)	Stadium: Stadion Solila; Referee: Miloš Savović

=== Second legs ===
24 October 2012	Mogren	0–0 (0–4 agg.)	Petrovac	Budva
14:00 CEST		Report		Stadium: Stadion Lugovi; Referee: Dražen Petrić

24 October 2012	Mladost	10–1 (12–2 agg.)	Pljevlja	Podgorica
14:00 CEST	Rotković 11', 20', 30', 37', 40', 42', 86'; Ćetković 17'; Pavićević 26', 78'	Report	Bambur 75'	Stadium: Mladost Stadium; Attendance: 200; Referee: Miloš Bošković

24 October 2012	Jedinstvo	0–1 (1–3 agg.)	Budućnost	Bijelo Polje
14:00 CEST		Report	Golubović 90'	Stadium: Gradski stadion Referee: Željko Radunović

24 October 2012	Gorštak	0–3 (0–5 agg.)	Grbalj	Kolašin
14:00 CEST		Report	Đalac 60', 85'; Merdović 65'	Stadium: Stadion u Lugu; Referee: Dragan Mijušković

24 October 2012	Sutjeska	0–0 (0–1 agg.)	Zeta	Nikšić
14:00 CEST		Report		Stadium: Gradski stadion Referee: Nikola Vođević

24 October 2012	Berane	1–2 (1–6 agg.)	Mornar	Berane
14:00 CEST	Đukić 83'	Report	Milanović 59' (o.g.); Vukićević 75' (o.g.)	Stadium: Gradski stadion Referee: Vladan Kojović

24 October 2012	Lovćen	5–0 (6–1 agg.)	Igalo	Cetinje
14:00 CEST	Perutović 18'; Padrov 24' (o.g.); Bogdanović 48'; I. Pejaković 60'; Turković 90+'	Report		Stadium: Stadion Obilića poljana Referee: Milovan Milačić

25 October 2012	Čelik	1–0 (2–1 agg.)	Rudar	Nikšić
14:00 CEST	Simić 58'	Report		Stadium: Stadion Željezare; Referee: Miloš Novović

== Quarter-finals ==
The eight winners from the second round competed in this round. The first legs took place on 7 and 21 November 2012 and the second legs took place on 21 and 28 November 2012.

=== Summary ===
Team 1	Agg.	Team 2	1st leg	2nd leg
Čelik	3–1	Lovćen	2–0	1–1
Grbalj	2–1	Mornar	1–0	1–1
Petrovac	1–2	Mladost	0–1	1–1
Budućnost	4–0	Zeta	2–0	2–0

=== First legs ===
7 November 2012	Petrovac	0–1	Mladost	Cetinje
13:30 CET		Report	Pavićević 58'	Stadium: Stadion Obilića poljana Attendance: 100; Referee: Vojin Vojinović

7 November 2012	Grbalj	1–0	Mornar	Radanovići
13:30 CET	Đalac 55'	Report		Stadium: Stadion Donja Sutvara; Attendance: 200; Referee: Miloš Bošković

7 November 2012	Čelik	2–0	Lovćen	Nikšić
13:30 CET	Zorić 17'; Bulajić 25'	Report		Stadium: Gradski stadion Attendance: 500; Referee: Miraš Cerović

21 November 2012	Budućnost	2–0	Zeta	Podgorica
13:30 CET	Adrović 39'; Bošković 52' (pen.)	Report		Stadium: Podgorica City Stadium; Attendance: 500; Referee: Nikola Dabanović

=== Second legs ===
21 November 2012	Mladost	1–1 (2–1 agg.)	Petrovac	Podgorica
13:30 CET	Šćepanović 45' (pen.)	Report	Jablan 83'	Stadium: Podgorica City Stadium; Attendance: 1,000; Referee: Željko Radunović

21 November 2012	Mornar	1–1 (1–2 agg.)	Grbalj	Bar
13:30 CET	Bogdanović 88'	Report	Nikolić 56'	Stadium: Stadion Topolica; Attendance: 200; Referee: Milovan Milačić

21 November 2012	Lovćen	1–1 (1–3 agg.)	Čelik	Cetinje
13:00 CET	Kaluđerović 87'	Report	Kolev 30'	Stadium: Stadion Obilića poljana Attendance: 150; Referee: Predrag Radovanović

28 November 2012	Zeta	0–2 (0–4 agg.)	Budućnost	Golubovci
13:00 CET		Report	Vukčević 26'; Nikač 67'	Stadium: Stadion Trešnjica; Attendance: 300; Referee: Predrag Radovanović

== Semi-finals ==
The four winners from the quarter-finals competed in this round. These matches took place on 3 and 16 April 2013.

=== Summary ===
Team 1	Agg.	Team 2	1st leg	2nd leg
Grbalj	0–2	Čelik	0–0	0–2
Mladost	3–4	Budućnost	1–1	2–3

=== First legs ===
3 April 2013	Grbalj	0–0	Čelik	Radanovići
15:00 CEST		Report		Stadium: Stadion Donja Sutvara; Attendance: 600; Referee: Pavle Radovanović

3 April 2013	Mladost	1–1	Budućnost	Podgorica
15:00 CEST	Tomić 12'	Report	Adrović 23'	Stadium: Mladost Stadium; Attendance: 1,000; Referee: Miloš Savović

=== Second legs ===
17 April 2013	Budućnost	3–2 (4–3 agg.)	Mladost	Podgorica
15:00 CEST	Nikač 10'; A. Orahovac 78'; Adrović 88'	Report	S. Orahovac 45+1' (pen.); Ishihara 90+3'	Stadium: Podgorica City Stadium; Attendance: 2,000; Referee: Nikola Dabanović

17 April 2013	Čelik	2–0 (2–0 agg.)	Grbalj	Nikšić
15:00 CEST	Zorić 49' (pen.), 74'	Report		Stadium: Stadion Željezare; Attendance: 1,500; Referee: Jovan Kaluđerović

== Final ==
22 May 2013
20:30 CEST

Budućnost	1–0	Čelik
Peković 90+1'

Podgorica City Stadium, Podgorica
Attendance: 6,000
Referee: Nikola Dabanović
