= 2009–10 Montenegrin Second League =

Montenegrin Second League
- Season: 2009–10
- Champions: Mladost
- Promoted: Mladost
- Relegated: Crvena Stijena; Gusinje
- Matches: 198
- Goals: 458 (2.31 per match)
- Top goalscorer: Darko Nikač (Mladost) (20 goals)

The 2009–10 Montenegrin Second League (Serbian: Druga Crnogorska Liga / Друга црногорска лига) was the fourth season since its establishment.

== Format of competition ==
Twelve teams participate in this league. The top team directly qualifies for the Montenegrin First League while the second and third teams contest in a two matches playoff against the 11th and 12th team from the First League. The two bottom-placed teams are relegated to the Third League, to be replaced by the two winners of the Third League promotion play-off.

== Teams ==
Locations of the 2009–10 teams

The following 12 clubs competed in this season.

Club	City	Stadium	Capacity
Bar	Bar	Stadion Topolica	2,500
Bokelj	Kotor	Stadion pod Vrmcem	5,000
Bratstvo Cijevna	Podgorica	Stadion Bratstva	1,000
Crvena Stijena	Podgorica	Stadion Tološi	1,000
Čelik	Nikšić	Stadion Željezare	2,000
Gusinje	Gusinje	Gradski stadion	2,000
Ibar	Rožaje	Bandžovo Brdo	2,500
Jedinstvo	Bijelo Polje	Gradski stadion	4,000
Jezero	Plav	Stadion Pod Racinom	5,000
Mladost	Podgorica	Stadion Cvijetni Brijeg	2,000
Otrant	Ulcinj	Stadion Olympic	1,500
Zabjelo	Podgorica	Stadion Zabjela	1,000

== League table ==
Pos	Team	Pld	W	D	L	GF	GA	GD	Pts	Promotion or relegation
1	Mladost (C, P)	33	21	8	4	75	32	+43	71	Promotion to the First League
2	Bar	33	18	11	4	40	10	+30	65	Qualification for the promotion play-offs
3	Bratstvo	33	15	11	7	35	24	+11	56	Qualification for the promotion play-offs
4	Bokelj	33	13	12	8	52	25	+27	51	
5	Zabjelo	33	12	9	12	33	34	−1	45	
6	Jedinstvo	33	11	10	12	42	43	−1	43	
7	Jezero	33	11	7	15	41	50	−9	40	
8	Čelik	33	11	6	16	36	51	−15	39	
9	Ibar	33	10	7	16	27	44	−17	37	
10	Otrant	33	8	12	13	28	35	−7	36	
11	Crvena Stijena (R)	33	9	9	15	30	44	−14	36	Relegation to the Third League
12	Gusinje (R)	33	5	6	22	19	66	−47	21	Relegation to the Third League

Rules for classification: 1) Points; 2) Head-to-head points; 3) Head-to-head goal difference; 4) Head-to-head goals scored; 5) Head-to-head away goals scored; 6) Goal difference; 7) Goals scored; 8) Draw.
(C) Champions; (P) Promoted; (R) Relegated

== Results ==
The schedule consists of three rounds. During the first two rounds, each team played each other once home-and-away for a total of 22 games. The pairings of the third round were then set according to the standings after the first two rounds, giving every team a third game against each opponent for a total of 33 games per team.

=== First and second round ===
Home \ Away	BAR	BOK	BRA	CRS	ČEL	GUS	IBA	JED	JEZ	MLA	OTR	ZAB
Bar		2–0	3–0	1–1	3–0	5–0	2–1	2–0	0–0	0–0	0–0	2–0
Bokelj	0–0		4–4	4–0	2–1	3–0	0–1	0–0	8–0	0–0	0–0	2–0
Bratstvo	0–1	1–0		2–0	2–1	1–0	2–0	1–0	1–0	0–0	1–0	1–0
Crvena Stijena	2–1	1–2	0–0		1–2	1–0	2–0	0–1	0–1	2–1	1–1	2–3
Čelik	1–1	1–0	0–1	3–2		0–0	4–0	1–2	0–0	3–1	2–1	0–0
Gusinje	0–1	0–0	1–2	2–1	1–0		0–1	1–4	0–3	1–6	1–1	2–1
Ibar	0–2	0–0	0–1	3–0	0–0	2–0		0–0	3–2	0–2	0–2	1–2
Jedinstvo	0–2	1–0	0–0	3–0	2–2	5–0	1–1		1–1	2–3	4–1	2–1
Jezero	1–0	1–4	1–1	1–0	1–2	1–2	1–1	3–2		1–2	2–1	2–0
Mladost	0–0	1–4	2–2	5–1	4–0	2–0	3–1	6–1	3–2		5–2	1–2
Otrant	0–0	1–1	0–0	0–0	0–1	0–1	1–0	2–0	2–0	1–2		0–1
Zabjelo	1–0	0–0	1–1	1–1	1–0	1–1	3–0	1–0	2–1	0–1	2–0	

Legend: Blue = home team win; Yellow = draw; Red = away team win.

=== Third round ===
Home \ Away	BAR	BOK	BRA	CRS	ČEL	GUS	IBA	JED	JEZ	MLA	OTR	ZAB
Bar				1–1			1–0	1–1	1–0	0–0		2–0
Bokelj	0–1			1–2			3–0	3–0	2–0	1–1		
Bratstvo	0–1	0–0		1–0	3–0	4–0					0–1	
Crvena Stijena					1–0	3–0	2–1		1–0		0–0	
Čelik	0–3	3–2					0–2		2–4	1–3		
Gusinje	0–1	2–3			2–4					1–3	0–2	
Ibar			2–2			1–0		1–0	2–1			1–0
Jedinstvo			1–0	1–1	2–0	1–1					3–0	0–4
Jezero			1–0			3–0		1–1			2–2	4–1
Mladost			3–0	1–1			4–1	3–1	3–0			2–0
Otrant	1–0	0–2			3–0		1–1			1–2		
Zabjelo		1–1	1–1	1–0	1–2	0–0					1–1	

Legend: Blue = home team win; Yellow = draw; Red = away team win.

== Promotion play-offs ==
The 3rd-placed team (against the 10th-placed team of the First League) and the runners-up (against the 11th-placed team of the First League) will both compete in two-legged promotion play-offs after the end of the season.

=== Summary ===
Team 1	Agg.	Team 2	1st leg	2nd leg
Bar	2–2 (4–5 p)	Berane	1–1	1–1
Bratstvo	1–3	Mornar	0–1	1–2

=== Matches ===
2 June 2010
17:00 CEST

Bar	1–1	Berane
Ljumović 60'	Report (page 37)	Lalević 39'

Stadion Topolica, Bar
Attendance: 500
Referee: Ranko Spasojević
6 June 2010
17:00 CEST

Berane	1–1 (a.e.t.)	Bar
Bulić 28'	Report (page 37)	Vuković 52'
Penalties
Đalac (penalty scored); Aković (penalty scored); Cimbaljević (penalty scored); Peličić (penalty scored); Bulić (penalty missed)	4–5	(penalty scored) Ljumović; (penalty scored) Čindrak; (penalty scored) Kovač; (penalty scored) Vuković; (penalty scored) Jovović

Gradski stadion, Berane
Attendance: 4,000
Referee: Ranko Spasojević

2–2 on aggregate. Bar won on penalties.

2 June 2010
17:00 CEST

Bratstvo	0–1	Mornar
	Report (page 37)	Peričić 2'

Stadion Trešnjica, Golubovci
Attendance: 1,000
Referee: Pavle Radovanović
6 June 2010
17:00 CEST

Mornar	2–1	Bratstvo
Rašović 60'; Peričić 87'	Report (page 37)	Jovićević 78'

Stadion Topolica, Bar
Attendance: 1,000
Referee: Pavle Radovanović

Mornar won 2–1 on aggregate.
