= 2013–14 Montenegrin First League =

Montenegrin First League
- Season: 2013–14
- Dates: 9 August 2013 – 31 May 2014
- Champions: Sutjeska; 2nd title
- Relegated: Dečić; Čelik
- Champions League: Sutjeska
- Europa League: Lovćen; Čelik; Budućnost
- Matches: 198
- Goals: 475 (2.4 per match)
- Top goalscorer: Stefan Mugoša (15 goals)
- Biggest home win: Sutjeska 5–1 Mogren (22 March 2014); Čelik 5–1 Dečić (3 May 2014)
- Biggest away win: Zeta 0–5 Čelik (5 April 2014)
- Highest scoring: Mogren 4–3 Zeta (28 August 2013); Zeta 5–2 Mornar (31 August 2013); Zeta 5–2 Mogren (27 November 2013); Dečić 3–4 Zeta (24 May 2014)
- Longest winning run: 6 games Lovćen
- Longest unbeaten run: 14 games Sutjeska
- Longest losing run: 6 games Dečić

The 2013–14 Montenegrin First League was the eighth season of the top-tier football in Montenegro. The season begins on 9 August 2013. The season has a winter break beginning on 7 December 2013 and ending on 25 February 2014. Sutjeska Nikšić are the defending champions.

== Teams ==
Last season, Jedinstvo Bijelo Polje were relegated to the Montenegrin Second League finishing in 12th place. Dečić were promoted.

=== Stadia and locations ===
Location of the 2013–14 Montenegrin First League teams

All figures for stadiums include seating capacity only, as many stadiums in Montenegro have stands without chairs which would otherwise be the actual number of people able to attend football matches not regulated by UEFA or FIFA.

Team	City	Stadium	Capacity	Coach
Budućnost	Podgorica	Stadion pod Goricom	12,000	(Montenegro) Goran Perisić
Čelik	Nikšić	Stadion Željezare	2,000	(Montenegro) Slavoljub Bubanja
Dečić	Tuzi	Stadion Tuško Polje	2,000	(Montenegro) Fuad Krkanović
Grbalj	Radanovići	Stadion Donja Sutvara	1,500	(Montenegro) Aleksandar Nedović
Lovćen	Cetinje	Stadion Obilića Poljana	2,000	(Montenegro) Mojaš Radonjić
Mladost	Podgorica	Stari Aerodrom	1,500	(Montenegro) Radovan Kavaja
Mogren	Budva	Stadion Lugovi	2,000	(Montenegro) Branislav Milačić
Mornar	Bar	Stadion Topolica	2,000	(Montenegro) Obren Sarić
Petrovac	Petrovac	Stadion pod Malim brdom	1,500	(Montenegro) Milorad Malovrazić
Rudar	Pljevlja	Stadion pod Golubinjom	10,000	(Montenegro) Mirko Marić
Sutjeska	Nikšić	Stadion kraj Bistrice	6,180	(Montenegro) Dragan Radojičić
Zeta	Golubovci	Stadion Trešnjica	4,000	(Montenegro) Rade Vešović

== League table ==
Pos	Team	Pld	W	D	L	GF	GA	GD	Pts	Qualification or relegation
1	Sutjeska (C)	33	17	12	4	46	21	+25	63	Qualification for the Champions League second qualifying round
2	Lovćen	33	17	8	8	52	31	+21	59	Qualification for the Europa League first qualifying round
3	Čelik (R)	33	15	9	9	47	28	+19	54	Qualification for the Europa League first qualifying round and relegation to the Third League (Note: Čelik were withdrawn from the league before the next season, due to the financial issues.)
4	Budućnost	33	16	6	11	36	26	+10	54	Qualification for the Europa League first qualifying round
5	Petrovac	33	11	13	9	37	31	+6	46	
6	Rudar	33	11	9	13	32	31	+1	42	
7	Grbalj (Note: Grbalj were deducted three points by FAM.)	33	11	10	12	36	40	−4	40	
8	Zeta	33	12	4	17	39	57	−18	40	
9	Mladost	33	11	6	16	38	46	−8	39	
10	Mogren (Note: Mogren were deducted three points by FAM.)	33	11	9	13	45	56	−11	39	Qualification for the relegation play-offs
11	Mornar (Note: Although they were lost the relegation play-offs, Mornar were saved from the relegation due to the withdrawal of Čelik.)	33	9	9	15	35	47	−12	36	Qualification for the relegation play-offs
12	Dečić (R)	33	5	9	19	32	61	−29	24	Relegation to the Second League

Source: Football Association of Montenegro (in Montenegrin), Soccerway
Rules for classification: 1) Points; 2) Head-to-head points; 3) Head-to-head goal difference; 4) Head-to-head goals scored; 5) Head-to-head away goals scored; 6) Goal difference; 7) Goals scored; 8) Draw.
(C) Champions; (R) Relegated

== Results ==
The schedule consisted of three rounds. During the first two rounds, each team played each other once home and away for a total of 22 matches. The pairings of the third round were then set according to the standings after the first two rounds, giving every team a third game against each opponent for a total of 33 games per team.

=== First and second round ===
Home \ Away	BUD	ČEL	DEČ	GRB	LOV	MLA	MOG	MOR	PET	RUD	SUT	ZET
Budućnost		2–0	2–0	0–0	2–1	1–1	2–0	1–2	1–2	0–1	0–0	2–0
Čelik	2–1		1–1	1–0	0–1	3–1	4–2	3–0	0–0	2–1	0–0	2–0
Dečić	0–2	2–2		3–0	0–0	0–1	1–1	2–0	1–1	1–0	0–1	1–1
Grbalj	0–1	1–0	3–1		0–0	3–0	0–1	0–0	2–2	1–3	2–2	2–0
Lovćen	2–0	0–2	1–1	4–0		1–0	1–3	1–2	0–1	2–1	3–0	4–1
Mladost	1–2	0–1	3–0	1–1	0–2		0–0	2–0	1–2	2–1	4–1	2–1
Mogren	1–0	1–1	3–1	3–1	2–3	1–1		2–2	0–0	0–1	0–3	4–3
Mornar	1–1	2–1	2–0	1–2	0–1	4–2	3–0		0–2	0–0	0–1	4–0
Petrovac	1–3	1–0	0–0	1–1	1–1	1–1	2–0	0–0		0–0	2–2	1–2
Rudar	1–0	1–2	2–1	1–0	1–2	2–0	1–1	1–1	0–1		0–1	0–1
Sutjeska	1–1	1–0	4–1	0–1	0–0	2–0	5–1	2–0	2–0	2–2		1–0
Zeta	0–1	1–1	2–2	0–2	1–0	1–0	5–2	5–2	3–2	2–0	0–2	

Source: Football Association of Montenegro (in Montenegrin)
Legend: Blue = home team win; Yellow = draw; Red = away team win.

=== Third round ===
Key numbers for pairing determination (number marks position after 22 games):

Rounds
23rd	24th	25th	26th	27th	28th	29th	30th	31st	32nd	33rd
1 – 12; 2 – 11; 3 – 10; 4 – 9; 5 – 8; 6 – 7	1 – 2; 8 – 6; 9 – 5; 10 – 4; 11 – 3; 12 – 7	2 – 12; 3 – 1; 4 – 11; 5 – 10; 6 – 9; 7 – 8	1 – 4; 2 – 3; 9 – 7; 10 – 6; 11 – 5; 12 – 8	3 – 12; 4 – 2; 5 – 1; 6 – 11; 7 – 10; 8 – 9	1 – 6; 2 – 5; 3 – 4; 10 – 8; 11 – 7; 12 – 9	4 – 12; 5 – 3; 6 – 2; 7 – 1; 8 – 11; 9 – 10	1 – 8; 2 – 7; 3 – 6; 4 – 5; 11 – 9; 12 – 10	5 – 12; 6 – 4; 7 – 3; 8 – 2; 9 – 1; 10 – 11	1 – 10; 2 – 9; 3 – 8; 4 – 7; 5 – 6; 12 – 11	6 – 12; 7 – 5; 8 – 4; 9 – 3; 10 – 2; 11 – 1

Home \ Away	BUD	ČEL	DEČ	GRB	LOV	MLA	MOG	MOR	PET	RUD	SUT	ZET
Budućnost			3–1	2–1	1–0		0–2		1–0			0–1
Čelik	1–0		5–1			0–1		2–0		1–1	0–0	
Dečić				0–1		2–1	2–0			1–2		3–4
Grbalj		1–0				1–3			1–1		1–1	3–1
Lovćen		1–1	4–2	3–2			1–2		2–1			4–0
Mladost	1–3				2–4		3–2	2–1		0–0		
Mogren		3–2		3–1					1–1		0–2	1–0
Mornar	0–0		2–1	0–1	1–1		2–2					2–1
Petrovac		1–2	3–0			1–2		1–0		3–0	0–1	
Rudar	2–0			1–1	0–1		2–1	4–0				
Sutjeska	0–1		4–0		1–1	1–0		3–1		0–0		
Zeta		0–5				1–0			1–2	1–0	0–0	

Source: Football Association of Montenegro (in Montenegrin)
Legend: Blue = home team win; Yellow = draw; Red = away team win.

== Relegation play-offs ==
The 10th-placed team (against the 3rd-placed team of the Second League) and the 11th-placed team (against the runners-up of the Second League) will both compete in two-legged relegation play-offs after the end of the season.

=== Summary ===
Team 1	Agg.	Team 2	1st leg	2nd leg
Jezero	1–6	Mogren	1–2	0–4
Mornar	1–2	Berane	1–0	0–2

=== Matches ===
4 June 2014
17:30 CEST

Jezero	1–2	Mogren
Čekić 41' (pen.)	Report	Radišić 18'; Rudović 38'

Stadion Pod Racinom, Plav
Attendance: 1,000
Referee: Aleksandar Marković
8 June 2014
17:30 CEST

Mogren	4–0	Jezero
Marković 32'; Rudović 38'; Đurišić 53'; Radišić 84'	Report

Stadion Lugovi, Budva
Attendance: 500
Referee: Pavle Radovanović

Mogren won 6–1 on aggregate.

4 June 2014
17:30 CEST

Mornar	1–0	Berane
V. Vujačić 90+4'	Report

Stadion Topolica, Bar
Attendance: 1,200
Referee: Miloš Savović
8 June 2014
17:30 CEST

Berane	2–0	Mornar
Huremović 48'; Dulović 84'	Report

Gradski stadion, Berane
Attendance: 5,000
Referee: Jovan Kaluđerović

Berane won 2–1 on aggregate.

== Top scorers ==
Rank	Scorer	Club	Goals
1	(Montenegro) Stefan Mugoša	Mladost	15
2	(Montenegro) Petar Orlandić	Zeta	11
3	(Montenegro) Aleksandar Vujačić	Budućnost	10
3	(Montenegro) Vule Vujačić	Mornar	10
3	(Montenegro) Darko Zorić	Čelik	10
6	(Montenegro) Milan Đurišić	Mogren	9
7	(Montenegro) Marko Đurović	Mogren	8
7	(Montenegro) Ivan Ivanović	Čelik	8
7	(Montenegro) Branislav Janković	Grbalj	8
7	(Montenegro) Srđan Radonjić	Sutjeska	8
7	(Montenegro) Luka Rotković	Mornar	8
