= Montenegrin First Youth League =

Youth football league in Montenegro

- Organising body: Football Association of Montenegro
- Founded: 2007
- Country: Montenegro
- Confederation: UEFA
- Number of clubs: 9
- Level on pyramid: 1
- Relegation to: Montenegrin Second Youth League
- Domestic cup: Montenegrin Youth Cup
- International cup: UEFA Youth League
- Current champions: Budućnost (7th title) (2024–25)
- Most championships: Budućnost 7 titles
- Website: https://fscg.me/takmicenja/prva-omladinska-liga/
- Current: 2025–26 Montenegrin First Youth League

The Montenegrin First Youth League (Montenegrin: Prva Omladinska liga Crne Gorepronounced [pr̂ːʋaː omladǐːnskaː lǐːɡaː t͡sr̩̂ːneː ɡǒːre]), also known as the Montenegrin First U19 League, is the highest football league for under-19 players in Montenegro. Founded in 2007, the competition has been headed by the Football Association of Montenegro ever since then. For the 2025–26 season the league will consist of 9 teams, the winner of the league will enter the UEFA Youth League Domestic Champions Path (a club can also enter the UEFA Youth League Champions League Path if the senior team qualifies for the UEFA Champions League). The team that finishes last gets relegated to the Montenegrin Second Youth League while the second to last placed team goes to a play-off against the runner-ups in the Montenegrin Second Youth League for a place in the First Youth League. The team that has won the most number of titles is Budućnost with 7 titles. Budućnost, together with Sutjeska, is one of only two clubs to have competed in every season of the Montenegrin First Youth League since its foundation, appearing in all 19 editions of the competition.

== History ==
=== Foundation and early years (2007–2016) ===
Following Montenegrin independence in 2006, the Football Association of Montenegro established its own professional football league. The Montenegrin Youth League system was made only a year after in 2007. The first season of the Montenegrin First Youth League consisted of 12 clubs, which were Blue Star Podgorica, Brskovo, Budućnost, Ibar, Jezero, Mogren, Mornar, Otrant-Olympic, Sutjeska, Tekstilac, Titograd (at the time, the club was known as FK Mladost) and Zabjelo. Budućnost were the ones that won the title that year which made them the first winners of the First Youth League. Lovćen were the first winners of the Montenegrin Youth Cup after beating Zeta 1–0 in two legs, the first leg played in Golubovci ended 0–0, while the second leg in Cetinje ended in a 1–0 win to Lovćen. The following season, Mogren won the league with a 14-point lead over second-placed Sutjeska. The 2008–09 season saw also five new teams participating for the first time, Bokelj, Polet Stars, Titex, Rudar, OFK Bar, Berane and Jedinstvo. The cup winners this time were Zeta who beat Rudar in the semi-finals with an aggregate score of 2–2 (Zeta won on away goals), Zeta later beat OFK Bar 4–1 in the final. Budućnost won their second league title the following year with 84 points, which was the record for most points in a season back then. That season, Budućnost were the first team that won the league and the cup in a single season. The 2009–10 season was also the first season that saw 18 teams participating, including many debutants such as Lovćen, Grbalj, Crvena Stijena, Zeta, Čelik and Petrovac. Mogren won the double next season after beating Budućnost in the cup final and finishing first in the league. Pljevlja 1997, Iskra and Dečić were all debutants that season. Sutjeska won their first league title during the 2011–12 season, however they failed to win the double after losing the cup final to Jedinstvo. The debutants that season were Igalo and Bratstvo. Mogren was the first club to win three titles as they won the league during the 2012–13 season. That year, Jedinstvo became the first team to win two cup-titles in a row, beating Sutjeska again in the final. Sutjeska won the double in the 2013–14 season after winning the league and the cup. Sutjeska beat Mogren 9–0 on aggregate in the semi-finals, which is the highest aggregate score ever in the semi-final of the Montenegrin Youth Cup, Sutjeska beat Mogren 6–0 in the second leg, marking the highest number of goals ever scored in a single match of the Montenegrin Youth Cup. Sutjeska went on to beat Rudar 1–0 in the final. Cetinje and Zora were the debutants that season. Budućnost won the title the following year with a record-breaking total of 91 points, surpassing their previous record from the 2009–10 season by seven points. In the cup, Sutjeska again won a match 6–0, this time against Petrovac. However, Sutjeska lost the final to Berane. Kom were the only debutants that season. Mladost (currently known as OFK Titograd) won their first league title on the 2015–16 after finishing on 87 points, which was eight points higher than the runner-ups Budućnost. Budućnost won the cup that season with a 4–0 win against Berane. During this season Cetinje finished on 0 points with 15 goals scored and 279 goals conceded, which to this day is still the record for the fewest number of points, fewest goals scored and the most goals conceded in a Montenegrin First Youth League season.

=== Introduction of new formats (2016–2023) ===
For the 2016–17 season, the Football Association of Montenegro introduced a new competition format. Instead of the league system used in previous seasons, a regular season is played first, after which the league is divided into two groups based on final standings. The top eight teams advance to Group A to compete for the championship, while teams placed 9th–16th enter Group B (a format similar to the Serbian SuperLiga). The regular season was won by Sutjeska who along with Budućnost, Mladost, Kom, Zeta, Dečić, Jedinstvo and Bokelj became the first participants of Group A. Petrovac, Grbalj, Bratstvo, Čelik, Rudar, Iskra, Jezero, Lovćen and Ibar became the first participants in Group B. Sutjeska were the first club to win the title in this new format while Petrovac were the top team in Group B. Grafičar were scheduled to make their debut season, but withdrew before playing any matches. The following season, Sutjeska again won both the regular season and Group A, securing their second consecutive title. Petrovac once more finished first in Group B. In the same season, Mladost won their first cup title after defeating Rudar 7–0 in a single-leg semi-final, setting a record for the largest single-leg victory in the Montenegrin Youth Cup, breaking the previous record of a 6–0 win set by Sutjeska against Petrovac three seasons earlier. Budućnost won the title in the 2018–19 season after finishing first in both the regular season and Group A, while Petrovac topped Group B for the third consecutive season. Budućnost also enjoyed a memorable cup run, defeating Jedinstvo 9–0 on aggregate in the semi-finals (4–0 in the first leg and 5–0 in the second), setting a record for the largest two-legged semi-final victory in the competition. The club set another record in the final by defeating Grbalj 9–0, which remains the largest winning margin in a cup final. Arsenal and Mladost Lješkopolje (now known as FK Podgorica) made their debut that season. In the 2019–20 season, Budućnost finished first in the regular season. However, due to the COVID-19 pandemic, the league was cancelled during the eighth round of the final phase. As a result of the pandemic, no cup competition was held that season.

For the 2020–21 season, the Football Association of Montenegro introduced a new format. Instead of playing a regular season followed by two separate groups, the participating teams were split into two groups, with each team competing against the others in its group. The league was organized into autumn and spring phases. During the autumn phase, Titograd and Zeta won their respective groups, with Titograd topping Group A and Zeta finishing first in Group B. During the spring phase, Budućnost and Sutjeska won their respective groups, with Budućnost finishing first in Group A and Sutjeska topping Group B. However, the format of having two separate groups and autumn and spring phases was short-lived, as the Football Association of Montenegro decided to return to the previous system for the 2021–22 season. The champions of the 2021–22 preliminary round were debutants Mladost DG. However, they failed to secure the overall title, as Kom went on to become champions that season. Titograd finished first in Group B. In the following season, Budućnost finished first in the preliminary round, level on points with Zeta but ahead on goal difference. Podgorica went on to win the title, becoming Group A champions, while Arsenal finished first in Group B.

=== Foundation of a second-tier (2023–present) ===
In 2023, the Football Association of Montenegro introduced a second tier within the Montenegrin youth league system. For the first time, a relegation system was implemented in the Montenegrin First Youth League: the team finishing last is directly relegated, while the second-to-last team enters a promotion–relegation playoff against the runner-up of the Montenegrin Second Youth League. At the same time, the number of teams in the Montenegrin First Youth League was reduced from 18 to 10, the lowest number of participants since the league’s foundation. The competition format used between 2007 and 2016 was also reintroduced, with each team playing one another three times per season. Budućnost were the first winners under the new format, securing the league title with a seven-point margin over second-placed Kom. Berane became the first team to be relegated from the Montenegrin First Youth League, while Petrovac entered the inaugural promotion–relegation playoff, defeating Jedinstvo 6–3 on aggregate (5–2 in the first leg and 1–1 in the second). Budućnost defended the title the following season, finishing on 64 points, 22 points ahead of second-placed Mornar. Zeta and Dečić were relegated at the end of the season.

== Competition format ==
=== Competition ===
An example of how a round–robin format works

There are 10 clubs competing in the Montenegrin First Youth League. During the course of a season (from August to May), each club plays each other two times in a double round-robin system, with one game at their home stadium and one at their opponent’s stadium. Each win gives three points, one point is awarded for a draw, and no points are given for a defeat. Teams are ranked first by total points, then by head-to-head record, followed by goal difference, and finally by the number of goals scored. At the end of the season, a Play-off for the title is held, where the top two ranked teams directly advance to the semi-finals, while the 3rd–6th placed teams compete in the quarter-finals. The third-placed team plays against the sixth-placed team, and the fourth-placed team plays against the fifth-placed team. Each pairing is played over a two-legged tie, with the first game hosted by the lower-ranked team. If the aggregate score is tied, a penalty shoot-out determines the winner, who then advances to the semi-finals. In the semi-finals, the winner of the third vs. sixth quarter-final faces the second-placed team, while the winner of the fourth vs. fifth quarter-final faces the first-placed team, again over a two-legged tie, with the first game hosted by the higher-ranked team. The winners of the semi-finals advance to the final, which is played at a neutral ground, and the winner of the final is crowned the champion of the Montenegrin First Youth League.

=== Promotion and relegation ===
Ever since 2023, a relegation system has been implemented in the Montenegrin First Youth League. Under this system, the lowest-placed team is relegated directly to the Montenegrin Second Youth League, while the ninth-placed team in the First League enters a play-off against the second-placed team from the Second League. The play-off is contested over two legs, and the winner earns a spot in the following season’s First League.

== Clubs ==
Since the foundation of the Montenegrin First Youth League, a total of 36 clubs have participated in all seasons.

=== Champions ===
Club	Winners	Runners-up	Winning seasons
Budućnost	7	5	2007–08, 2009–10, 2014–15, 2018–19, 2020–21 Group A, 2023–24, 2024–25
Sutjeska	5	4	2011–12, 2013–14, 2016–17, 2017–18, 2020–21 Group B
**Mogren**	3	2	2008–09, 2010–11, 2012–13
Kom	1	2	2021–22,
Titograd	1	0	2015–16
Podgorica	1	0	2022–23

Italics indicate former First League champions that are currently outside the First League.

Bold text indicates former First League champions that have been dissolved.

==== Champions by cities ====
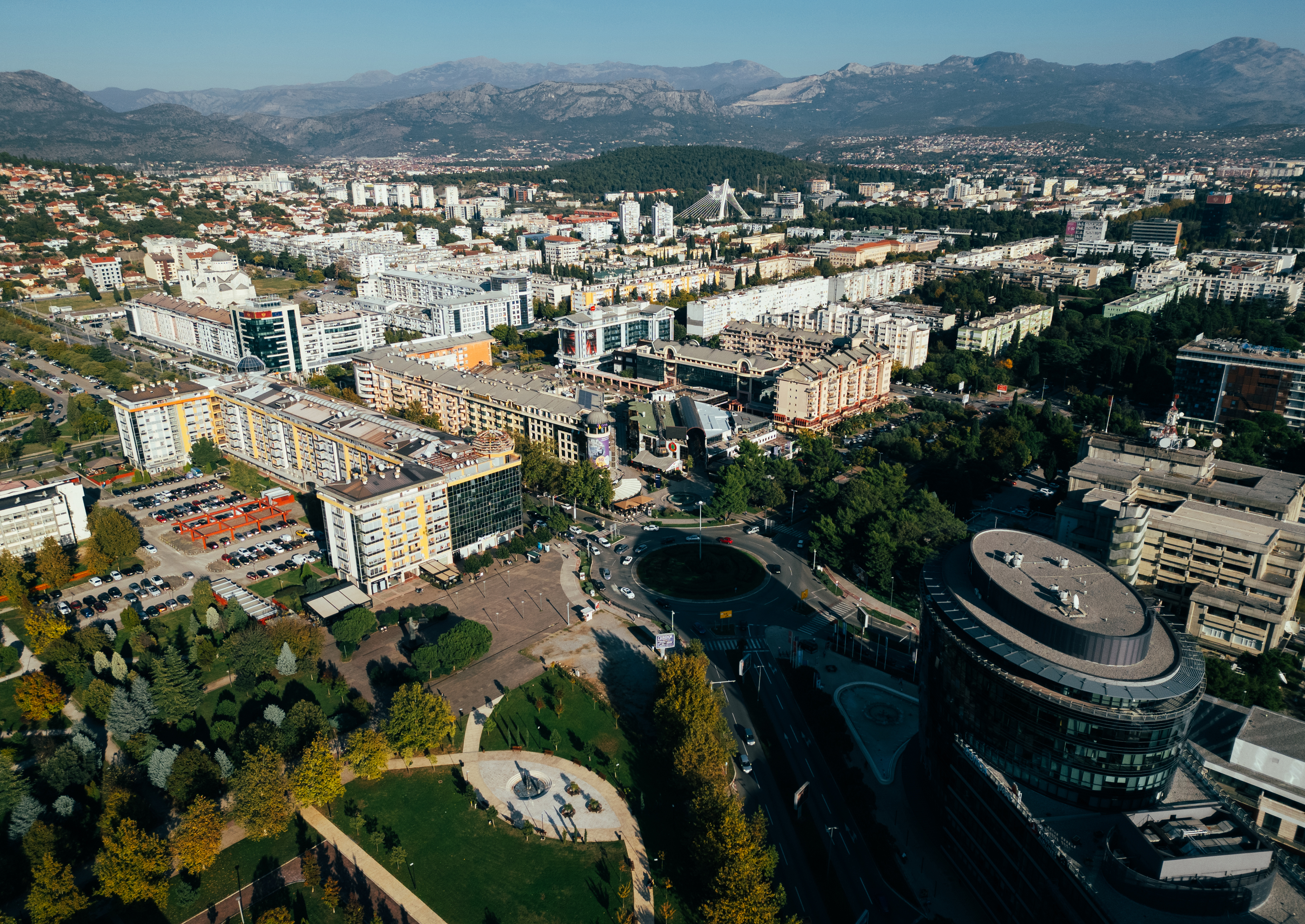
Podgorica is the city with the most league titles and the highest number of clubs that have won the league.

City	Titles	Winning clubs
Podgorica	10	Budućnost,Titograd, Podgorica and Kom
Nikšić	5	Sutjeska
Budva	3	Mogren

=== 2025–26 season ===
2025–26 Club	2024–25 Position	First season in First League	Seasons in First League	Top division titles	Most recent top division title
Arsenal	1st in the Second League	2018–19	3	0	N/A
Budućnost (Note: One of the original twelve First League teams) (Note: Never been relegated from the First League)	1st	2007–08	19	7	2024–25
Iskra	3rd	2011–12	13	0	N/A
Kom	5th	2014–15	11	1	2021–22
Mladost DG	7th	2020–21	6	0	N/A
Mornar	2nd	2007–08	16	0	N/A
Petrovac	4th	2009–10	17	0	N/A
Podgorica	6th	2018–19	8	1	2022–23
Sutjeska	8th	2007–08	19	5	2020–21

== European competitions ==
=== Qualification for European competitions ===
Ever since the 2015–16 season, the champions of the Montenegrin First Youth League have been allowed to compete in the UEFA Youth League Domestic Champions path. However, it was not until the 2016–17 season that a Montenegrin club first participated in the UEFA Youth League. Since then, the champions of the Montenegrin First Youth League have qualified for the UEFA Youth League Domestic Champions path. Additionally, a Montenegrin club can also qualify for the UEFA Youth League Champions League Path if the senior team of that club qualifies for the UEFA Champions League.

=== Performance in European Competitions ===
==== History ====
Titograd was the first Montenegrin youth club to compete in the UEFA Youth League in the 2016–17 season. They were set to play against Sparta Prague from the Czech Republic in the first round. However, in the first leg in Prague, Titograd lost 4–0. It didn’t go any better for Titograd in the second leg in Podgorica, as they lost 5–0. In the end, Titograd lost 9–0 on aggregate and failed to advance to the second round. Sutjeska became the next Montenegrin team to participate in the UEFA Youth League. In the first round of the 2017–18 UEFA Youth League, they were drawn against the Hungarian team Honvéd. In the first leg in Nikšić, Sutjeska came back from a 2–0 deficit to hold Honvéd to a 2–2 draw. However, in the second leg in Budapest, Sutjeska were defeated 1–0, eventually losing 3–2 on aggregate. In the 2018–19 season, the Football Association of Montenegro did not enter a team in the 2018–19 UEFA Youth League. The Football Association of Montenegro did not enter a team for the 2019–20 season either. The Football Association of Montenegro did not enter a team in the UEFA Youth League again until the 2024–25 season, ending a six-year absence of Montenegrin teams from the competition.

The logo of the UEFA Youth League

Budućnost ended the six-year absence of Montenegrin clubs in the UEFA Youth League and also made their European debut in the same season. Budućnost were drawn in the first round against Dinamo Tbilisi from Georgia. In the first leg in Tbilisi, the Georgian side beat Budućnost 3–2 after a last-minute goal from Nikoloz Chikovani. However, Budućnost managed to overturn the score and win 4–1 in the second leg, thanks to a hat-trick from Andrej Kostić. They won 6–4 on aggregate and advanced to the second round. Budućnost also became the first Montenegrin club to reach the second round of the UEFA Youth League. In the second round, Budućnost were drawn against the Turkish club Trabzonspor. In the first leg in Trabzon, Budućnost lost 3–1 to the Turkish side. However, it didn’t get any better for Budućnost, as they lost 5–2 at home in the second leg, going down 8–3 on aggregate. Budućnost qualified for the UEFA Youth League for a second consecutive season in 2025–26. On this occasion, Budućnost were drawn against Welsh club Haverfordwest County in the first round. In the first leg in Haverfordwest, Budućnost defeated Haverfordwest 3–2, with Petar Vujović scoring a late goal. Budućnost also won the second leg in Podgorica 2–1, scoring twice in first-half stoppage time, eventually winning 5–3 on aggregate. In the second round, Budućnost were drawn against Danish club Midtjylland. The tie proved difficult for Budućnost, as Midtjylland won the first leg in Ikast 3–0. The second leg in Podgorica also proved difficult for Budućnost, as Midtjylland won 5–1, resulting in an 8–1 aggregate defeat.

==== Summary ====
===== Performances by clubs =====
Team	Seasons	G	W	D	L	GD	Pts
FK Budućnost Podgorica	2	8	3	0	5	15:23	9
FK Sutjeska Nikšić	1	2	0	1	1	2:3	1
OFK Titograd	1	2	0	0	2	0:9	0
OVERALL		12	3	1	8	17:35	10

===== Performances against opposing countries =====
Opponents' country	G	W	D	L	GD
Czech Republic	2	0	0	2	0:9
Denmark	2	0	0	2	1:8
Georgia	2	1	0	1	6:4
Hungary	2	0	1	1	2:3
Turkey	2	0	0	2	3:8
Wales	2	2	0	0	5:3

=== Performances by season ===
==== UEFA Youth League ====
Season	Club	Round	Opponent	Home	Away	Aggregate
2016–17	Titograd	1QR	(Czech Republic) Sparta Prague	0–5	0–4	0–9
2017–18	Sutjeska	1QR	(Hungary) Honvéd FC	2–2	0–1	2–3
2024–25	Budućnost	1QR	(Georgia (country)) Dinamo Tbilisi	4–1	2–3	6–4
2024–25	Budućnost	2QR	(Turkey) Trabzonspor	2–5	1–3	3–8
2025–26	Budućnost	1QR	(Wales) Haverfordwest	2–1	3–2	5–3
2025–26	Budućnost	2QR	(Denmark) Midtjylland	1–5	0–3	1–8

== Players ==
The Montenegrin First Youth League has produced numerous players who have gone on to compete in top European leagues. One of the most notable is Vasilije Adžić, who came through the youth system of Budućnost and signed for Italian club Juventus, the most successful club in Italy, in 2024. Budućnost has also developed other players, including Andrej Kostić, who plays for Serbian club Partizan. Sutjeska has also produced talented players, including Milutin Osmajić, who plays for English Championship club Preston North End. Other clubs in the league have also produced notable players, such as Kom, which developed Andrija Bulatović, who currently plays for French club Lens, and Zeta, which developed Nikola Krstović, who plays for Italian club Atalanta.
