= Bojan Brnović =

Montenegrin footballer (born 1979)

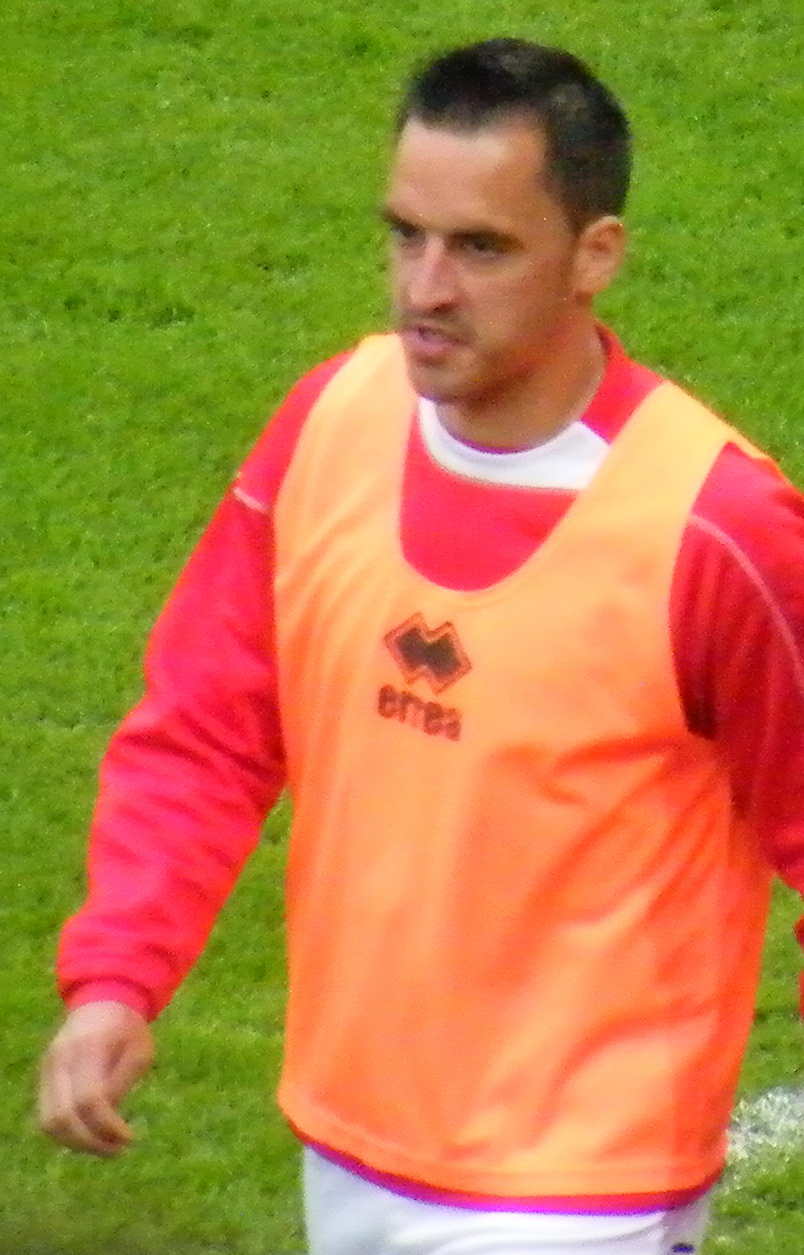
- Brnović with Diósgyőr in 2010

Personal information
- Full name: Bojan Brnović
- Date of birth: 10 February 1979 (age 47)
- Place of birth: Titograd, SFR Yugoslavia
- Height: 1.75 m (5 ft 9 in)
- Position: Striker

Youth career
- Zabjelo

Senior career*
Years	Team	Apps	(Gls)
1997–1998	Zabjelo	31	(13)
1998–1999	Mladost Apatin	24	(9)
1999–2003	Zeta	81	(37)
2003–2005	Partizan	12	(1)
2005	→ Obilić (loan)	13	(4)
2005–2007	Debrecen	35	(15)
2007–2010	Győr	69	(19)
2010	→ Diósgyőr (loan)	9	(1)
2011–2012	Čelik Nikšić	22	(6)
2013–2014	Ebes	30	(9)
2014	Biatorbágy	14	(4)
Total		340	(118)

International career
2000–2001	FR Yugoslavia U21	5	(4)
2002	FR Yugoslavia	2	(1)
- * Club domestic league appearances and goals

Bojan Brnović (Cyrillic: Бојан Брновић; born 10 February 1979) is a Montenegrin former professional footballer who played as a striker.

== Club career ==
During his active career, Brnović played for numerous clubs, most notably for Zeta in his country, as well as for Debrecen and Győr in Hungary.

== International career ==
Brnović made his debut for Serbia and Montenegro in an April 2002 friendly match against Lithuania in which he immediately scored a goal and has earned a total of 2 caps, scoring 1 goal. His other and final international cam e three weeks after his debut against Ecuador.

== Personal life ==
He is the older brother of Nenad Brnović.

== Statistics ==
Club	Season	League	
Club	Season	Apps	Goals
Mladost Apatin	1998–99	24	9
Zeta	1999–2000		
Zeta	2000–01	32	10
Zeta	2001–02	16	6
Zeta	2002–03	33	21
Partizan	2003–04	11	1
Partizan	2004–05	1	0
Obilić (loan)	2004–05	13	4
Debrecen	2005–06	25	12
Debrecen	2006–07	10	3
Győr	2006–07	9	3
Győr	2007–08	25	10
Győr	2008–09	23	5
Győr	2009–10	12	1
Diósgyőr (loan)	2009–10	9	1
Čelik Nikšić	2011–12	22	6
Čelik Nikšić	2012–13	0	0
Ebes	2012–13	12	4
Ebes	2013–14	18	5
Biatorbágy	2014–15	14	4

== Honours ==
Debrecen

- Nemzeti Bajnokság I: 2005–06
- Szuperkupa: 2005, 2006

Čelik Nikšić

- Montenegrin Cup: 2011–12
- Montenegrin Second League: 2011–12
