= Nikola Rakojević =

Montenegrin football manager (born 1958)

Personal information
- Date of birth: 15 January 1958 (age 68)
- Place of birth: Nikšić, PR Montenegro, FPR Yugoslavia
- Position: Midfielder

Senior career*
Years	Team	Apps	(Gls)
1975–1989	Sutjeska Nikšić	274	(37)
Total		274	(37)

Managerial career
- 1992–1993: Sutjeska Nikšić
- 1993–1994: Rudar Pljevlja
- 1994–1995: Sutjeska Nikšić
- 1995–1996: Rudar Pljevlja
- 1996–1997: Jedinstvo Paraćin
- 1997–1998: Hajduk Kula
- 1998–2000: Vrbas
- 2000–2001: FR Yugoslavia U21
- 2001–2003: Zeta
- 2003–2004: Borac Banja Luka
- 2004–2005: Čukarički
- 2005–2006: Budućnost Banatski Dvor
- 2006–2007: Banat Zrenjanin
- 2007–2008: Lovćen
- 2008–2010: Sutjeska Nikšić
- 2010: Budućnost Podgorica
- 2011: Sutjeska Nikšić
- 2011: Čelik Nikšić
- 2012–2013: Rudar Pljevlja
- 2013: Mladost Podgorica
- 2015–2016: Mladost Podgorica
- 2017–2020: Sutjeska Nikšić
- 2020–2021: OFK Titograd
- 2022: Petrovac
- 2022–: Montenegro U21
- * Club domestic league appearances and goals

Nikola "Peco" Rakojević (Serbian Cyrillic: Никола Пецо Ракојевић; born 15 January 1958) is a Montenegrin football manager and former player.

== Playing career ==
A one-club man, Rakojević played for Sutjeska Nikšić over the course of 14 seasons between 1975 and 1989, making over 250 appearances in the Yugoslav First League and Second League combined.

== Managerial career ==
During his managerial career, Rakojević worked at numerous clubs, mainly in Montenegro and Serbia, but also in Bosnia and Herzegovina. He served as manager of Sutjeska Nikšić, Rudar Pljevlja, Jedinstvo Paraćin, Hajduk Kula, Vrbas, Zeta (2001–2003), Borac Banja Luka (2003–04), Čukarički (2004–05), Budućnost Banatski Dvor (2005–06), Banat Zrenjanin (2006–07), Lovćen (2007–08), Sutjeska Nikšić (2008–2010), Budućnost Podgorica (Jun–Dec 2010), Sutjeska Nikšić (Jan–Apr 2011), Čelik Nikšić (2011), Rudar Pljevlja (2012–13), and Mladost Podgorica (Jun–Oct 2013).

At international level, Rakojević led the FR Yugoslavia U21s during the UEFA European Under-21 Championship 2002 qualifying stage.

== Honours ==
Borac Banja Luka

- Bosnian Cup runner-up: 2003–04

Mladost Podgorica

- Montenegrin First League: 2015–16

Sutjeska Nikšić

- Montenegrin First League: 2017–18, 2018–19
- Montenegrin Cup: 2016–17
