= Darko Karadžić =

Montenegrin footballer

Personal information
- Full name: Darko Karadžić
- Date of birth: 17 April 1989 (age 37)
- Place of birth: Nikšić, SFR Yugoslavia
- Height: 1.81 m (5 ft 11 in)
- Position: Left midfielder

Youth career
- 2006–2007: Sutjeska Nikšić
- 2007–2008: Red Star Belgrade

Senior career*
Years	Team	Apps	(Gls)
2008–2010	Rad	0	(0)
2009	→ Fehérvár (loan)	2	(0)
2010	→ Inđija (loan)	1	(0)
2010	Rudar Pljevlja	3	(0)
2010	Čelik Nikšić	8	(0)
2011	Spartak Subotica	4	(0)
2011–2014	Sutjeska Nikšić	79	(22)
2014	Mladost Podgorica	12	(0)
2015	Mornar	2	(0)
2015–2016	Sutjeska Nikšić	17	(3)
2016	Čelik Nikšić	7	(2)

International career
2006	Serbia and Montenegro U17		
- * Club domestic league appearances and goals

Darko Karadžić (Cyrillic: Дарко Караџић; born 17 April 1989) is a retired Montenegrin footballer.

== Club career ==
He played in the youth teams of FK Sutjeska Nikšić and Red Star Belgrade. He made his senior debut in 2008 when he signed with Serbian side FK Rad. Afterwards, he played on loan for Hungarian Championship club FC Fehérvár and Serbian First League club FK Inđija. In 2010, he returned to Montenegro this time to play with FK Rudar Pljevlja but stayed only for a short period as he moved to FK Čelik Nikšić. The following winter he signed with FK Spartak Subotica from the Serbian SuperLiga. However, in summer 2011 he returned to the club where he started playing, FK Sutjeska Nikšić. In June 2014 he signed with FK Mladost Podgorica. After a short spell with FK Mornar, he rejoined FK Sutjeska Nikšić.

== International career ==
He was part of the Serbia and Montenegro squad at the 2006 UEFA European Under-17 Championship, where he scored against Belgium.

== Honours ==
Rudar Pljevlja

- Montenegrin First League: 2009–10

Sutjeska

- Montenegrin First League: 2012–13, 2013–14
