= Mileta Radulović =

Montenegrin footballer

Personal information
- Date of birth: 29 January 1981 (age 45)
- Place of birth: Titograd, SR Montenegro, Yugoslavia
- Height: 1.89 m (6 ft 2 in)
- Position: Goalkeeper

Senior career*
Years	Team	Apps	(Gls)
1999–2002	Mladost Podgorica		
2002–2005	Sutjeska Nikšić	34+	(0+)
2003	→ Čelik Nikšić (loan)		
2004	→ Čelik Nikšić (loan)		
2005–2006	Zeta	8	(0)
2006	→ BASK Beograd (loan)		
2006–2007	Željezničar Sarajevo	16	(0)
2007–2008	Mladost Podgorica	33	(0)
2008	Crvena Stijena		
2008–2010	Budućnost Podgorica	38	(0)
2010	OFK Bar	11	(0)
2011–2014	Grbalj	95	(2)
2014–2016	Mladost Podgorica	62	(0)
2016–2017	Petrovac	25	(2)
- * Club domestic league appearances and goals as of 21 June 2014

Mileta Radulović (born 29 January 1981) is a Montenegrin former professional footballer who played as a goalkeeper.

== Career ==
Born in Titograd, Radulović played for Mladost Podgorica, Sutjeska Nikšić, Čelik Nikšić, Zeta, Serbian side FK BASK, Bosnian Željezničar Sarajevo, Crvena Stijena, Budućnost Podgorica, OFK Bar and OFK Grbalj.
