= Dejan Ognjanović =

Montenegrin footballer

Personal information
- Full name: Dejan Ognjanović
- Date of birth: 21 June 1978 (age 48)
- Place of birth: Kotor, SFR Yugoslavia
- Height: 1.87 m (6 ft 1 1/2 in)
- Position: Right-back

Senior career*
Years	Team	Apps	(Gls)
1994–1998	Bokelj	22	(0)
1998–2001	Budućnost Podgorica	67	(2)
2001–2006	Partizan	30	(2)
2004–2005	→ Estoril (loan)	0	(0)
2006	→ Obilić (loan)	14	(0)
2006–2008	Estoril	21	(0)
2008–2010	ŁKS Łódź	26	(0)
2010–2013	Smederevo	46	(2)
2011–2012	→ Kastrioti Krujë (loan)	14	(0)
2013–2015	Sutjeska Nikšić	69	(0)
2015–2018	Bokelj	50	(3)

International career
2001	FR Yugoslavia	2	(0)
2008–2010	Montenegro	5	(0)
- * Club domestic league appearances and goals

Dejan Ognjanović (Cyrillic: Дејан Огњановић; born 21 June 1978) is a Montenegrin former professional footballer who played as a defender. On the international level, he represented FR Yugoslavia most notably at the 2001 Kirin Cup as well as Montenegro from 2008 to 2010.

== Club career ==
=== Partizan ===
Partizan made a move for Ognjanović shortly after his Kirin Cup debut for the Yugoslavia national team in the summer transfer window of 2001. He immediately became a standard defender in Partizan's starting XI under coach Ljubiša Tumbaković. Partizan would win the First League of Yugoslavia in 2002 and 2003 with Ognjanović. Ognjanović's 2003–2004 season with Partizan was especially significant, as it was his first opportunity to be mentored by a foreign coach, Lothar Matthäus, who had been hired by Partizan before the end of the 2003 season. Matthäus would take Partizan to their first UEFA Champions League in many years in 2003-04 season, and Ognjanović would feature in the group stage that season, in the away loss (by a score of 1–0) against Real Madrid and the home game tie (1-1) against Olympique de Marseille.

=== Estoril ===
Ognjanović's first spell with Estoril began in the summer of 2004 when Partizan loaned him out to the Portuguese side on a one-year loan. In one of his first trainings with Estoril, Ognjanović suffered a catastrophic ankle injury which took him out of football until 2005. Amazingly, Estoril still pursued Ognjanović two years later, and would sign him permanently in 2006.

=== Łódź ===
Ognjanović then was transferred Polish side ŁKS Łódź in the 2008 summer transfer window, for a fee of approximately €16,000. He would play a full season with the Polish side, amassing 26 league appearances for the club.

=== Smederevo ===
After playing for ŁKS Łódź, Ognjanović came back to Serbian football after four years and signed with Smederevo in the winter 2009-10 transfer window. On 27 February 2010, Ognjanović made his debut with Smederevo and scored a goal in a 2–1 victory against FK Rad. After 18 months with Smederevo, he was loaned out to Albanian Superliga side Kastrioti Krujë where he spent one season, but would come back to FK Smederevo in the summer 2012 transfer window for which he played until December 2012.

=== Sutjeska ===
Ognjanović signed with Sutjeska Nikšić in January 2013, in a move that surprised the Montenegrin press due to the rivalry between Ognjanović's former club Budućnost and Sutjeska. Ognjanović won two Montenegrin national titles with Sutjeska, in 2013 and 2014.

== International career ==
Ognjanović made two appearances with Yugoslavia's national team in the 2001 Kirin Cup, in a pair of losses to Japan and Paraguay. Seven years later, Ognjanović began to play for the newly independent Montenegro national football team, for which he made a total of five appearances up to 2010. His final international was a March 2010 friendly match against Macedonia.

== Honours ==
Partizan

- First League of FR Yugoslavia: 2001–02, 2002–03

Sutjeska

- Montenegrin First League: 2012–13, 2013–14
