= Radinovići =

Radinovići may refer to the following villages in central Bosnia:

- Radinovići, Visoko
- Radinovići, Zenica

== See also ==
- Radanovići (disambiguation)
