= 2011–12 Montenegrin Second League =

Montenegrin Second League
- Season: 2011–12
- Champions: Čelik
- Promoted: Čelik; Mornar; Jedinstvo
- Relegated: Kom; Petnjica
- Matches: 198
- Goals: 479 (2.42 per match)
- Top goalscorer: Damir Alković (Zabjelo) (22 goals)

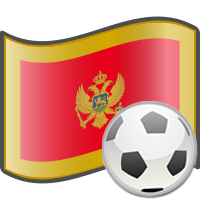

The 2011–12 Montenegrin Second League (Serbian: Druga Crnogorska Liga / Друга црногорска лига) was the sixth season of the competition as the second top football league in Montenegro. The league played its first games of the season on August 14, 2011, and its final matches were played on May 30, 2012.

== Format of competition ==
Twelve teams participate in this league. The top team directly qualifies for the Montenegrin First League while the second and third teams contest in a two matches playoff against the 11th and 12th team from the First League. The two bottom-placed teams are relegated to the Third League, to be replaced by the two winners of the Third League promotion play-off.

== Teams ==
Locations of the 2011–12 teams

The following 12 clubs competed in this season.

Club	City	Stadium	Capacity
Bar	Bar	Stadion Topolica	2,500
Bratstvo Cijevna	Podgorica	Stadion Bratstva	1,000
Čelik	Nikšić	Stadion Željezare	2,000
Ibar	Rožaje	Bandžovo Brdo	2.500
Igalo	Igalo	Stadion Solila	1,600
Iskra	Danilovgrad	Stadion Braće Velašević	2,000
Jedinstvo	Bijelo Polje	Gradski stadion	4,000
Jezero	Plav	Stadion Pod Racinom	5,000
Kom	Podgorica	Stadion Zlatica	3,000
Mornar	Bar	Stadion Topolica	2,500
Petnjica	Petnjica	Stadion Gusare	1,000
Zabjelo	Podgorica	Stadion Zabjela	1,000

== League table ==
Pos	Team	Pld	W	D	L	GF	GA	GD	Pts	Promotion or relegation
1	Čelik (C, P)	33	25	5	3	72	14	+58	80	Promotion to the First League and qualification for the Europa League first qualifying round (Note: Čelik Nikšić qualified as 2011–12 Montenegrin Cup winners.)
2	Mornar (P)	33	19	7	7	55	26	+29	64	Qualification for the promotion play-offs
3	Jedinstvo (P)	33	18	7	8	50	23	+27	61	Qualification for the promotion play-offs
4	Zabjelo	33	15	5	13	47	46	+1	50	
5	Bratstvo	33	14	6	13	44	40	+4	48	
6	Igalo	33	12	8	13	25	27	−2	44	
7	Jezero	33	11	9	13	26	35	−9	42	
8	Bar	33	12	4	17	44	54	−10	40	
9	Iskra	33	11	6	16	31	47	−16	39	
10	Ibar	33	10	8	15	35	42	−7	38	
11	Kom (R)	33	9	10	14	35	47	−12	37	Relegation to the Third League
12	Petnjica (R)	33	3	3	27	15	78	−63	12	Relegation to the Third League

Rules for classification: 1) Points; 2) Head-to-head points; 3) Head-to-head goal difference; 4) Head-to-head goals scored; 5) Head-to-head away goals scored; 6) Goal difference; 7) Goals scored; 8) Draw.
(C) Champions; (P) Promoted; (R) Relegated

== Results ==
The schedule consists of three rounds. During the first two rounds, each team played each other once home-and-away for a total of 22 games. The pairings of the third round were then set according to the standings after the first two rounds, giving every team a third game against each opponent for a total of 33 games per team.

=== First and second round ===
Home \ Away	BAR	BRA	ČEL	IBA	IGA	ISK	JED	JEZ	KOM	MOR	PET	ZAB
Bar		2–0	0–3	1–0	2–0	2–1	1–2	4–0	2–0	0–0	1–2	2–0
Bratstvo	3–6		0–1	2–0	0–0	0–0	1–0	2–1	1–2	2–1	2–1	3–1
Čelik	4–1	2–0		3–1	2–0	3–0	1–0	4–0	3–0	1–0	3–0	3–2
Ibar	4–0	1–2	1–2		0–1	1–0	0–1	1–1	2–2	1–1	4–1	1–2
Igalo	1–0	1–0	0–1	0–1		2–1	0–0	0–0	1–0	0–3	1–0	2–0
Iskra	1–1	0–3	1–4	1–0	1–0		1–2	0–1	0–1	0–1	1–0	0–1
Jedinstvo	1–0	2–0	1–0	0–0	0–0	4–0		2–1	1–0	0–0	3–0	3–0
Jezero	1–0	1–1	0–1	1–2	0–1	0–1	1–1		1–0	1–0	1–1	2–0
Kom	1–0	0–3	0–0	0–0	0–0	1–1	0–3	1–1		1–1	0–1	1–3
Mornar	2–0	2–1	0–0	1–0	2–0	2–3	2–0	1–0	2–2		1–1	2–0
Petnjica	0–3	1–3	0–5	0–1	1–0	0–2	0–1	0–2	0–3	0–1		0–3
Zabjelo	0–2	0–0	1–2	1–1	1–0	2–1	3–2	3–1	3–0	5–1	1–0	

Legend: Blue = home team win; Yellow = draw; Red = away team win.

=== Third round ===
Home \ Away	BAR	BRA	ČEL	IBA	IGA	ISK	JED	JEZ	KOM	MOR	PET	ZAB
Bar					2–5		3–3	0–1	3–2		2–0	1–1
Bratstvo	1–0		1–0	4–0		0–1				0–2	3–2	
Čelik	5–1	2–0		4–0		5–0	1–1				5–0	2–0
Ibar	1–0						0–3	1–0	2–2			7–2
Igalo		1–1	0–0	0–0		2–0				2–0		
Iskra	5–1			1–0			1–0		3–3			1–1
Jedinstvo		3–1			2–0			3–0	1–2	1–2	3–0	
Jezero	1–0	3–2	0–0		1–0	0–0				1–0		
Kom		2–1	0–1	0–0	2–1			1–2		1–4		
Mornar	4–1		3–1	3–0		4–0					5–1	2–0
Petnjica				0–2	2–4	0–3		1–1	0–3			
Zabjelo		1–1			2–0		2–1	1–0	0–2		5–0	

Legend: Blue = home team win; Yellow = draw; Red = away team win.

== Promotion play-offs ==
The 3rd-placed team (against the 10th-placed team of the First League) and the runners-up (against the 11th-placed team of the First League) will both compete in two-legged promotion play-offs after the end of the season.

Playoff matches were played on 3 and 7 June 2012.

=== Summary ===
Team 1	Agg.	Team 2	1st leg	2nd leg
Dečić	0–2	Jedinstvo	0–0	0–2
Berane	1–5	Mornar	1–2	0–3

=== Matches ===
3 June 2012
17:30 CEST

Dečić	0–0	Jedinstvo
	Report (page 37)

Stadion Tuško Polje, Tuzi
Attendance: 1,500
Referee: Željko Radunović
7 June 2012
17:30 CEST

Jedinstvo	2–0	Dečić
Gojačanin 21', 42'	Report (page 37)

Gradski stadion, Bijelo Polje
Attendance: 3,500
Referee: Nikola Dabanović

Jedinstvo won 2–0 on aggregate.

3 June 2012
17:30 CEST

Berane	1–2	Mornar
Tomović 7'	Report (page 37)	Jovović 10'; Vojvodić 68'

Gradski stadion, Berane
Attendance: 2,000
Referee: Mileta Šćepanović
7 June 2012
17:30 CEST

Mornar	3–0	Berane
Metović 8', 26'; Jovančov 33'	Report (page 37)

Stadion Topolica, Bar
Attendance: 3,000
Referee: Aleksandar Marković

Mornar won 5–1 on aggregate.
