= Andjelo Rudović =

Montenegrin footballer (born 1996)

Personal information
- Date of birth: 3 May 1996 (age 30)
- Place of birth: Ulcinj, FR Yugoslavia
- Height: 1.80 m (5 ft 11 in)
- Positions: Attacking midfielder; winger

Team information
- Current team: Otrant-Olympic
- Number: 11

Youth career
- 2002–2009: Otrant
- 2009–2011: Mornar
- 2011–2013: Mogren

Senior career*
Years	Team	Apps	(Gls)
2013–2014	Mogren	17	(1)
2014–2015	Jong PSV	16	(0)
2015–2016	Titograd	25	(2)
2016–2017	Petrovac	28	(6)
2017	Spartak Subotica	0	(0)
2018	Kom	8	(1)
2018–2019	Otrant-Olympic	50	(9)
2020–2021	Dečić	53	(10)
2021–2022	Mohammedan	17	(4)
2022	Budućnost	13	(0)
2023	Arsenal Tivat	14	(2)
2023–	Otrant-Olympic	91	(20)

International career
2012	Montenegro U17	3	(0)
2014–2015	Montenegro U19	6	(2)
2016	Montenegro U21	1	(0)
- * Club domestic league appearances and goals as of 18 June 2026

Andjelo or Anđelo Rudović (Montenegrin: Анђело Рудовић, Albanian: Angjëll Rudaj; born 3 May 1996) is a Montenegrin professional footballer who plays as an attacking midfielder or winger for Montenegrin Second League club Otrant-Olympic.

== Club career ==
Born in Ulcinj, Rudović started playing football with Otrant in his home town at the age of 6. Later he moved to Mornar Bar, where he stayed for two years. Finally, he joined Mogren where he ended his youth career and made his first senior appearances with the club in 2013. Rudović signed a one-year deal with PSV Eindhoven in 2014. As a club member, he usually played with reserves, making his professional debut for Jong PSV player in the second division on 19 September 2014 in a 0–2 home defeat against Sparta Rotterdam. After the end of contract he left the club in summer 2015, after which he joined Mladost Podgorica. Making 29 appearances with 2 goals at total in both domestic competitions mostly as a back-up player, Rudović contributed to winning the Montenegrin First League for 2015–16 season. Next summer, he left the club and moved to OFK Petrovac.

On 17 August 2017, Rudović signed with the Serbian SuperLiga side Spartak Subotica, peening a three-year professional contract with new club. Making a single appearance with a goal in the Serbian Cup match against Polet Lipljan, Rudović released by the club in December same year. At the beginning of 2018, Rudović signed with Kom.

On 12 November 2021, Rudović moved to India and joined I-League side Mohammedan Sporting ahead of the team's Calcutta Football League final against Railway FC. On 18 November, Mohammedan clinched their 12th Calcutta Football League title after forty long years, defeating Railway FC 1–0, in which Rudović played a key role.

He scored his first league goal for Mohammedan on 8 March 2022 against Sreenidi Deccan in their 3–1 win. Under Nikola Stojanović's captaincy, Mohammedan for the first time, ran for their maiden national league title in 2021–22 I-League season, but finished as runners-up after a 2–1 defeat to Gokulam Kerala at the end.

== International career ==
Rudović represented Montenegro at the under-17 and under-19 levels.

== Career statistics ==
=== Club ===
As of 14 May 2022

Club	Season	League			Cup		Continental		Total	
Club	Season	Division	Apps	Goals	Apps	Goals	Apps	Goals	Apps	Goals
Mogren	2012–13	First League	2	0	0	0	—		2	0
Mogren	2013–14	First League	15	3	1 (Note: Appearance(s) in Montenegrin Cup)	0	—		16	3
Jong PSV	2014–15	Eerste Divisie	16	0	0	0	—		16	0
Titograd	2015–16	First League	25	2	2	0	—		27	2
Petrovac	2016–17	First League	28	6	2	0	—		30	6
Spartak Subotica	2017–18	SuperLiga	0	0	1 (Note: Appearance(s) in Serbian Cup)	1	—		1	1
Kom	2017–18	First League	8	1	0	0	—		8	1
Otrant-Olympic	2018–19	Second League	34	5	1	0	—		35	5
Otrant-Olympic	2019–20	Second League	16	4	0	0	—		16	4
Otrant-Olympic	Otrant-Olympic total		50	9	1	0	0	0	51	9
Dečić	2019–20	Second League	10	4	0	0	—		10	4
Dečić	2020–21	First League	29	5	2	3	—		31	8
Dečić	2021–22	First League	14	1	1	0	2 (Note: Appearance(s) in UEFA Europa Conference League)	0	17	1
Dečić	Dečić total		53	10	3	3	2	0	58	13
Mohammedan	2021–22	I-League	17	4	0	0	—		17	4
Career total			214	35	10	4	2	0	226	39

== Honours ==
Mladost Podgorica

- Montenegrin First League: 2015–16

Mohammedan Sporting

- Calcutta Football League: 2021
- I-League runner-up: 2021–22
