= Nemanja Vlahović =

Montenegrin footballer

Personal information
- Full name: Nemanja Vlahović
- Date of birth: 4 January 1991 (age 35)
- Height: 1.81 m (5 ft 11 in)
- Positions: Defensive midfielder; right-back

Team information
- Current team: Igalo
- Number: 8

Senior career*
Years	Team	Apps	(Gls)
2009–2011	Zeta		
2011–2013	Zabjelo		
2013–2015	Kom		
2015	Mladost Podgorica	2	(0)
2016	OFK Beograd	1	(0)
2016-2017	Mornar		
2017–2018	Dečić	21	(0)
2018–	Igalo		

International career
2009	Montenegro U19	0	(0)
- * Club domestic league appearances and goals as of 17 July 2018

Nemanja Vlahović (Serbian Cyrillic: Немања Влаховић; born 4 January 1991) is a Montenegrin professional footballer who plays as a midfielder for Igalo.

Vlahović started his career with Zeta, and later played for Zabjelo, Kom and Mladost Podgorica in Montenegro, before he joined Serbian SuperLiga club OFK Beograd and signed one-year contract with that club beginning of 2016.
