= 2012–13 Montenegrin First League =

Montenegrin First League
- Season: 2012–13
- Dates: 11 August 2012 – 1 June 2013
- Champions: Sutjeska; 1st title
- Relegated: Jedinstvo
- Champions League: Sutjeska
- Europa League: Čelik; Rudar; Mladost
- Matches: 198
- Goals: 485 (2.45 per match)
- Top goalscorer: Admir Adrović; Žarko Korać (both 15 goals)
- Biggest home win: Grbalj 4–0 Rudar (17 November 2012)
- Biggest away win: Lovćen 1–6 Sutjeska (1 December 2012)
- Highest scoring: Zeta 3–4 Petrovac (26 August 2012); Lovćen 1–6 Sutjeska (1 December 2012); Čelik 4–3 Zeta (6 April 2013); Rudar 3–4 Budućnost (4 May 2013)
- Longest winning run: 6 games Sutjeska
- Longest unbeaten run: 15 games Budućnost
- Longest losing run: 9 games Mornar

The 2012–13 Montenegrin First League was the seventh season of top-tier football in Montenegro. The season began on 11 August 2012 and ended on 1 June 2013. The mid-season winter break began on 2 December 2012 and ended on 7 March 2013. FK Budućnost Podgorica are the defending champions.

== Teams ==
Last season, Bokelj, Berane, and Dečić were relegated to the Montenegrin Second League. Montenegrin Cup winners FK Čelik Nikšić were promoted along with Mornar and Jedinstvo Bijelo Polje.

=== Stadiums and locations ===
Location of the 2012–13 Montenegrin First League teams

All figures for stadiums include seating capacity only, as many stadiums in Montenegro have stands without chairs which would otherwise be the actual number of people able to attend football matches not regulated by UEFA or FIFA.

Team	City	Stadium	Capacity	Coach
Budućnost	Podgorica	Stadion Pod Goricom	12,000	(Montenegro) Radislav Dragićević
Čelik	Nikšić	Stadion Željezare	1,000	(Montenegro) Slavoljub Bubanja
Grbalj	Radanovići	Stadion Donja Sutvara	1,000	(Montenegro) Aleksandar Nedović
Jedinstvo	Bijelo Polje	City Stadium	5,000	(Montenegro) Sreten Avramović
Lovćen	Cetinje	Stadion Obilića Poljana	1,000	(Montenegro) Mojaš Radonjić
Mladost	Podgorica	Stadion Cvijetni Brijeg	1,000	(Montenegro) Miodrag Vukotić
Mogren	Budva	Stadion Lugovi	2,000	(Montenegro) Branislav Milačić
Mornar	Bar	Stadion Topolica	1,000	(Montenegro) Obren Sarić
Petrovac	Petrovac	Stadion Pod Malim Brdom	530	(Montenegro) Milorad Malovrazić
Rudar	Pljevlja	Gradski stadion Pljevlja	10,000	(Montenegro) Nikola Rakojević
Sutjeska	Nikšić	Gradski stadion kraj Bistrice	10,800	(Montenegro) Dragan Radojičić
Zeta	Golubovci	Stadion Trešnjica	4,000	(Montenegro) Mladen Vukićević

== League table ==
Pos	Team	Pld	W	D	L	GF	GA	GD	Pts	Qualification or relegation
1	Sutjeska (C)	33	20	5	8	50	31	+19	65	Qualification for the Champions League second qualifying round
2	Budućnost	33	17	9	7	57	38	+19	60	Excluded from European competitions (Note: Budućnost won the 2012–13 Montenegrin Cup, so the other UEFA Europa League spots initially shifted down. Budućnost and Grbalj were excluded from participating in UEFA club competitions for the next season after FSCG denied them an UEFA license.)
3	Čelik	33	15	8	10	41	35	+6	53	Qualification for the Europa League first qualifying round
4	Grbalj	33	13	12	8	41	21	+20	51	Excluded from European competitions
5	Rudar	33	15	6	12	42	40	+2	51	Qualification for the Europa League first qualifying round
6	Mladost	33	9	12	12	39	48	−9	39	Qualification for the Europa League first qualifying round
7	Petrovac	33	8	14	11	36	42	−6	38	
8	Zeta	33	8	13	12	43	45	−2	37	
9	Lovćen	33	11	4	18	36	52	−16	37	
10	Mogren (Note: Mogren were deducted 1 point.) (O)	33	10	7	16	33	42	−9	36	Qualification for the relegation play-offs
11	Mornar (O)	33	9	9	15	36	47	−11	36	Qualification for the relegation play-offs
12	Jedinstvo (R)	33	9	9	15	31	45	−14	36	Relegation to the Second League

Source: Soccerway
Rules for classification: 1) Points; 2) Head-to-head points; 3) Head-to-head goal difference; 4) Head-to-head goals scored; 5) Head-to-head away goals scored; 6) Goal difference; 7) Goals scored; 8) Draw.
(C) Champions; (O) Play-off winners; (R) Relegated

== Results ==
The schedule consisted of three rounds. During the first two rounds, each team played each other once home and away for a total of 22 matches. The pairings of the third round were then set according to the standings after the first two rounds, giving every team a third game against each opponent for a total of 33 games per team.

=== First and second round ===
Home \ Away	BUD	ČEL	GRB	JED	LOV	MLA	MOR	MOG	PET	RUD	SUT	ZET
Budućnost		1–1	1–0	0–0	3–1	1–0	4–1	0–2	4–1	1–4	2–0	3–3
Čelik	0–0		0–3	2–0	1–1	3–0	3–0	0–0	0–2	1–0	3–0	2–2
Grbalj	1–2	2–0		2–1	1–0	1–1	2–0	0–0	0–0	4–0	0–0	2–0
Jedinstvo	0–5	0–1	0–0		3–0	0–0	1–3	1–2	2–0	0–2	0–1	0–0
Lovćen	1–2	0–3	0–0	0–1		2–3	1–2	1–0	1–1	0–1	1–6	2–0
Mladost	1–1	0–1	0–0	3–3	0–0		2–1	3–1	2–0	2–0	1–2	1–1
Mornar	1–4	0–0	1–0	0–0	1–2	0–0		0–1	1–2	0–2	0–0	2–1
Mogren	1–2	1–2	0–0	0–1	3–1	0–3	2–1		3–1	0–0	0–2	1–1
Petrovac	1–1	0–0	0–0	0–3	2–1	3–1	0–0	0–0		1–2	1–2	0–0
Rudar	0–0	1–3	1–0	1–1	3–0	1–0	3–2	1–0	0–2		0–1	1–1
Sutjeska	1–0	1–0	1–0	3–0	2–0	2–1	2–1	0–2	2–1	2–0		2–1
Zeta	1–3	3–1	1–0	2–1	2–0	0–0	0–1	1–0	3–4	1–3	1–0	

Source: Football Association of Montenegro (in Montenegrin)
Legend: Blue = home team win; Yellow = draw; Red = away team win.

=== Third round ===
Key numbers for pairing determination (number marks position after 22 games):

Rounds
23rd	24th	25th	26th	27th	28th	29th	30th	31st	32nd	33rd
1 – 12; 2 – 11; 3 – 10; 4 – 9; 5 – 8; 6 – 7	1 – 2; 8 – 6; 9 – 5; 10 – 4; 11 – 3; 12 – 7	2 – 12; 3 – 1; 4 – 11; 5 – 10; 6 – 9; 7 – 8	1 – 4; 2 – 3; 9 – 7; 10 – 6; 11 – 5; 12 – 8	3 – 12; 4 – 2; 5 – 1; 6 – 11; 7 – 10; 8 – 9	1 – 6; 2 – 5; 3 – 4; 10 – 8; 11 – 7; 12 – 9	4 – 12; 5 – 3; 6 – 2; 7 – 1; 8 – 11; 9 – 10	1 – 8; 2 – 7; 3 – 6; 4 – 5; 11 – 9; 12 – 10	5 – 12; 6 – 4; 7 – 3; 8 – 2; 9 – 1; 10 – 11	1 – 10; 2 – 9; 3 – 8; 4 – 7; 5 – 6; 12 – 11	6 – 12; 7 – 5; 8 – 4; 9 – 3; 10 – 2; 11 – 1

Home \ Away	BUD	ČEL	GRB	JED	LOV	MLA	MOR	MOG	PET	RUD	SUT	ZET
Budućnost		1–0	1–4		0–3		0–1	1–2	1–1			
Čelik				1–2	1–3	1–0				1–1	1–0	4–3
Grbalj		2–3		4–1	3–0	4–1					1–1	1–1
Jedinstvo	2–3					1–1	2–1			2–0		1–1
Lovćen				2–0			2–0	2–1	0–1			3–2
Mladost	1–2				0–5		3–3	3–1	1–1	2–0		
Mornar		4–1	3–0					2–1	1–1		1–1	
Mogren		0–1	0–1	1–0							3–2	1–4
Petrovac		2–0	1–1	0–1				2–2			1–2	
Rudar	3–4		0–2		1–2		3–1	3–2	2–1			
Sutjeska	1–3			4–1	2–1	2–3				1–1		2–0
Zeta	0–0					5–0	0–0		2–2	0–2		

Source: Football Association of Montenegro (in Montenegrin)
Legend: Blue = home team win; Yellow = draw; Red = away team win.

== Relegation play-offs ==
The 10th-placed team (against the 3rd-placed team of the Second League) and the 11th-placed team (against the runners-up of the Second League) will both compete in two-legged relegation play-offs after the end of the season.

=== Summary ===
Team 1	Agg.	Team 2	1st leg	2nd leg
Zabjelo	2–9	Mogren	1–6	1–3
Bokelj	1–2	Mornar	1–0	0–2

=== Matches ===
5 June 2013
17:30 CEST

Zabjelo	1–6	Mogren
Rašović 31'	Report (page 37)	Vujović 35', 76', 80'; Peličić 42'; Zec 70'; Milović 79'

Camp FSCG, Podgorica
Attendance: 2,000
Referee: Pavle Radovanović
9 June 2013
17:30 CEST

Mogren	3–1	Zabjelo
Gardašević 14'; Grbović 58'; Vujović 73'	Report (page 37)	Nenadović 68'

Stadion Lugovi, Budva
Attendance: 300
Referee: Dražen Petrić

Mogren won 9–2 on aggregate.

5 June 2013
17:30 CEST

Bokelj	1–0	Mornar
Nikezić 45'	Report (page 37)

Stadion Pod Vrmcem, Kotor
Attendance: 1,000
Referee: Željko Radunović
9 June 2013
17:30 CEST

Mornar	2–0	Bokelj
Rotković 37', 84'	Report (page 37)

Stadion Topolica, Bar
Attendance: 2,000
Referee: Jovan Kaluđerović

Mornar won 2–1 on aggregate.

== Top scorers ==
Rank	Scorer	Club	Goals
1	(Montenegro) Admir Adrović	Budućnost	15
2	(Montenegro) Žarko Korać	Zeta	14
3	(Serbia) Stevan Račić	Čelik	12
3	(Montenegro) Marko Šćepanović	Mladost	12
5	(Montenegro) Danilo Ćulafić	Mornar	11
5	(Montenegro) Milan Đurišić	Lovćen	11
5	(Montenegro) Darko Karadžić	Sutjeska	11
5	(Montenegro) Nikola Vujović	Mogren	11
9	(Serbia) Nikola Ašćerić	Grbalj	9
9	(Serbia) Đorđe Šušnjar	Sutjeska	9
