= Nemanja Gojačanin =

Montenegrin footballer

Personal information
- Date of birth: 29 April 1993 (age 33)
- Place of birth: Bijelo Polje, FR Yugoslavia
- Height: 1.79 m (5 ft 10 1/2 in)
- Position: Right-back

Youth career
- 2008–2011: Jedinstvo Bijelo Polje

Senior career*
Years	Team	Apps	(Gls)
2011–2013	Jedinstvo Bijelo Polje	48	(1)
2013–2015	Javor Ivanjica	32	(0)
2015–2016	Mladost V. Obarska		
2016–2017	Jedinstvo Bijelo Polje	11	(0)
2017	Ängelholms FF	13	(0)

International career^{‡}
2012–2014	Montenegro U-21	8	(0)
- * Club domestic league appearances and goals as of 1 January 2018 (UTC) ‡ National team caps and goals as of 3 April 2015

Nemanja Gojačanin (Serbian Cyrillic: Немања Гојачанин, born 29 April 1993) is a Montenegrin footballer who plays as a right-back.

== Club career ==
Born in Bijelo Polje, he played with FK Jedinstvo Bijelo Polje youth team since 2008. He made a debut for Jedinstvo senior team in the season 2011–12 in the Montenegrin Second League. Jedinstvo finished third and got promoted with Gojačanin making 25 appearances that season and scoring once. In the following season, 2012–13, now playing in the Montenegrin First League, Gojačanin made 23 appearances. This regularity got him a move abroad, to Serbian side FK Javor Ivanjica. He made a debut in the 2013–14 Serbian SuperLiga as a starter in an away match against Spartak Subotica played on August 31, 2013.

== National team ==
Nemanja Gojačanin made a debut for the Montenegrin U-21 team as a starter in a qualifying match for the 2013 UEFA European Under-21 Football Championship against the Czech Republic, played on September 7, 2012.
