= Radanovci =

Radanovci may refer to the following villages:

- Radanovci, Livno, in Bosnia and Herzegovina
- Radanovci, Kosjerić, in Serbia

== See also ==
- Radanovići (disambiguation)
