= Igor Ivanović (Montenegrin footballer) =

Montenegrin footballer

Personal information
- Full name: Igor Ivanović
- Date of birth: 9 September 1990 (age 36)
- Place of birth: Titograd, SR Montenegro, SFR Yugoslavia
- Height: 1.78 m (5 ft 10 in)
- Position: Attacking midfielder

Team information
- Current team: Budućnost
- Number: 7

Senior career*
Years	Team	Apps	(Gls)
2008–2009	Zora	1	(0)
2009–2010	Kom	6	(0)
2010	Iskra Danilovgrad	13	(2)
2011–2012	Rudar Pljevlja	46	(12)
2013–2014	OFK Beograd	26	(3)
2014–2015	Rudar Pljevlja	26	(13)
2015–2016	Zira	28	(3)
2016–2018	Sutjeska	56	(22)
2018–2021	Budućnost	113	(38)
2022	Dečic	16	(2)
2023	Bunyodkor	20	(2)
2024–	Budućnost	57	(9)

International career^{‡}
2011	Montenegro U21	3	(0)
2020–	Montenegro	11	(3)
- * Club domestic league appearances and goals as of 1 June 2026 ‡ National team caps and goals as of 24 March 2022

Igor Ivanović (Serbian Cyrillic: Игор Ивановић; born 9 September 1990) is a Montenegrin professional footballer who plays as an attacking midfielder for Budućnost.

== Club career ==
=== Early career ===
Born in Titograd, Ivanović played with FK Zora before making his debut in the 2009–10 Montenegrin First League with FK Kom. He will play the first half of the 2010–11 season with FK Iskra Danilovgrad in the Montenegrin Second League before joining, in the winter break, top flight side FK Rudar Pljevlja where he will play during the next two years. During the winter break of the 2012–13 season, he will move abroad by joining Serbian SuperLiga side OFK Beograd and signing a 3.5 years contract.

In August 2015 Ivanović signed a two-year contract with Zira FK of the Azerbaijan Premier League.

=== Sutjeska Nikšić ===
On 21 June 2016, Ivanović signed a contract with Montenegrin club Sutjeska Nikšić. On 29 December 2017, the Football Association of Montenegro selected Ivanović for its annual Player of the Year award. During his career at Sutjeska, Montenegro's Syndicate of Professional Football Players voted for Ivanović as the best player of the Montenegrin First League in 2017 and 2018.

=== Budućnost ===
On 10 June 2018, Ivanović signed a two-year contract with Montenegrin club Budućnost.

== International career ==
Ivanović was a member of the Montenegrin U21 team. He scored on his debut with the Montenegro national team in a 1–1 draw against Latvia on 7 October 2020. Three days later, he scored less than a minute after coming on as a substitute in his competitive debut against Azerbaijan. On 13 October 2020, he scored again in a match against Luxembourg.

== Personal life ==
Ivanović's brother Ivan is also a professional footballer, currently playing for Atyrau in the Kazakhstan Premier League.

== Honours ==
'Rudar Pljevlja

- Montenegrin Cup: 2011

Individual

- Montenegrin First League top goalscorer: 2017–18

== International goals ==
Scores and results list Montenegro's goal tally first.

No.	Date	Venue	Opponent	Score	Result	Competition
1.	7 October 2020	Podgorica City Stadium, Podgorica, Montenegro	Latvia	1–1	1–1	Friendly
2.	10 October 2020	Podgorica City Stadium, Podgorica, Montenegro	Azerbaijan	2–0	2–0	2020–21 UEFA Nations League C
3.	13 October 2020	Podgorica City Stadium, Podgorica, Montenegro	Luxembourg	1–0	1–2	2020–21 UEFA Nations League C
