= Kuduzović =

Kuduzović is a surname. People with the surname include:

- Fahrudin Kuduzović, a Bosnian footballer
- Lina Kuduzović, a Slovenian singer
- Elmir Kuduzović, a Bosnian professional footballer
