= Elmir Kuduzović =

Bosnian professional footballer (born 1985)

Personal information
- Full name: Elmir Kuduzović
- Date of birth: 28 February 1985 (age 41)
- Place of birth: Tuzla, SFR Yugoslavia
- Height: 1.82 m (5 ft 11 1/2 in)
- Position: Left-back

Youth career
- 1990–2001: Radnički Lukavac

Senior career*
Years	Team	Apps	(Gls)
2004–2005	Radnički Lukavac		
2006–2008	Željezničar	37	(1)
2008–2010	Sloboda Tuzla	31	(2)
2010–2011	Čelik Zenica	8	(0)
2011–2012	Čelik Nikšić	20	(0)
2012	Čelik Zenica	6	(0)
2013	Zvijezda Gradačac	?	(?)
2014	Sloboda Tuzla	10	(0)
2015–2016	Radnički Lukavac	34	(7)
2016–2017	Bratstvo Gračanica	24	(6)
2017–2020	Velež Mostar	43	(1)
2020	Igman Konjic	1	(0)

International career
2007	Bosnia and Herzegovina XI	1	(0)
2009	Bosnia and Herzegovina	1	(0)
- * Club domestic league appearances and goals as of 8 March 2020

Elmir Kuduzović (born 28 February 1985) is a Bosnian professional footballer who plays as a left-back.

== Club career ==
Kuduzović began his career in local club Radnički Lukavac. After several years in Radnički, he moved to Željezničar in 2005, making his debut in the Bosnian Premier League. In 2008, he became a member of Sloboda Tuzla, moving in 2010 to another Bosnian top flight club, Čelik Zenica. In the summer of 2011, Kuduzović went to Montenegro by signing with Čelik Nikšić. After winning the Montenegrin Second League and the Montenegrin Cup, he came back to Čelik Zenica. However, due to disciplinary problems, he was suspended by the manager Vlado Jagodić and was released from the club in mid-season after only making 6 appearances.

After Čelik, Kuduzović played for Zvijezda Gradačac, Sloboda Tuzla again, Radnički Lukavac again and Bratstvo Gračanica.

In June 2017, he signed with First League of FBiH club Velež Mostar. On 25 May 2019, Kuduzović won the First League of FBiH with Velež after the club beat Bosna Visoko 0–2 away and got promoted to the Bosnian Premier League. He left Velež in January 2020.

Shortly after leaving Velež, Kudužović signed a six-month contract with Igman Konjic.

== International career ==
After being a member of the Bosnia and Herzegovina U21 national team, Kuduzović played for the first team in an unofficial match against Poland in 2007. His sole official international was a June 2009 friendly match against Uzbekistan.

== Honours ==
Čelik Nikšić

- Montenegrin Cup: 2011–12
- Montenegrin Second League: 2011–12

Velež Mostar

- First League of FBiH: 2018–19
