= Marko Vučić =

Montenegrin association football player

Personal information
- Date of birth: 30 December 1996 (age 29)
- Place of birth: Nikšić, FR Yugoslavia
- Height: 1.80 m (5 ft 11 in)
- Position: Left-back

Team information
- Current team: Mornar
- Number: 3

Senior career*
Years	Team	Apps	(Gls)
2014–2020	Sutjeska Nikšić	139	(15)
2016	→ Čelik Nikšić (loan)		
2020–2021	Budućnost Podgorica	23	(0)
2021–2022	Sutjeska Nikšić	23	(5)
2022	Novi Pazar	3	(0)
2022–2024	Sutjeska Nikšić	29	(3)
2025–	Mornar	9	(0)

International career^{‡}
2016–2018	Montenegro U21	8	(0)
2021–	Montenegro	1	(0)
- * Club domestic league appearances and goals as of 17 June 2026 ‡ National team caps and goals as of 18:31, 2 June 2021 (UTC)

Marko Vučić (Serbian Cyrillic: Марко Вучић; born 30 December 1996) is a Montenegrin footballer who plays as a left-back for Mornar and the Montenegro national team.

== Career ==
Vučić made his international debut for Montenegro on 2 June 2021 in a friendly match against Bosnia and Herzegovina, coming on as a substitute in the 76th minute for Marko Vešović. The away match finished as a 0–0 draw.

== Career statistics ==
=== International ===
As of 2 June 2021

Montenegro
Year	Apps	Goals
2021	1	0
Total	1	0
