= Radanovići =

Radanovići may refer to:

- Radanovići, Kiseljak, village in Bosnia and Herzegovina
- Radanovići, Kotor, village in Montenegro

== See also ==
- Radanović, people with the surname
- Radinovići (disambiguation)
