= Ivan Ivanović (footballer) =

Montenegrin footballer

Personal information
- Date of birth: 14 September 1989 (age 37)
- Place of birth: Bijelo Polje, SFR Yugoslavia
- Position: Left winger

Team information
- Current team: Iskra

Senior career*
Years	Team	Apps	(Gls)
2008–2009	Zora		
2009–2010	Jezero		
2010–2011	Bar	17	(3)
2011–2014	Čelik Nikšić	58	(13)
2014	Rudar Pljevlja	16	(2)
2015	Atyrau	24	(1)
2016	Rudar Pljevlja	30	(2)
2017	Mladost Podgorica	14	(0)
2017	Mornar	16	(5)
2018	Pobeda Prilep	16	(0)
2018–2019	Mornar	17	(0)
2019	TB Tvøroyri	22	(2)
2020	Lovćen	10	(1)
2020–2022	Jedinstvo Bijelo Polje	56	(10)
2022-2023	FK Podgorica	23	(0)
2023-	Iskra	32	(3)

International career
2013	Montenegro	1	(0)
- * Club domestic league appearances and goals as of 19 May 2024

Ivan Ivanović (born 14 September 1989) is a Montenegrin international footballer who plays for Iskra Danilovgrad in the Montenegrin Second League as a left winger.

== Club career ==
Born in Bijelo Polje, Ivanović has played for Zora, Jezero, Bar, Čelik Nikšić and Rudar Pljevlja as well as abroad in Kazakhstan, North Macedonia and the Faroe Islands.

== International career ==
Ivanović made his debut for Montenegro in a November 2013 friendly match against Luxembourg, coming on as a late substitute for Nemanja Nikolić. It remained his sole international appearance.

== Personal life ==
Ivanović's brother Igor is also a professional footballer, who has played for Zira in the Azerbaijan Premier League.
