= Miloš Đalac =

Montenegrin footballer (born 1982)

Personal information
- Full name: Miloš Đalac
- Date of birth: 17 October 1982 (age 44)
- Place of birth: Titograd, SFR Yugoslavia
- Height: 1.82 m (5 ft 11 1/2 in)
- Position: Forward

Senior career*
Years	Team	Apps	(Gls)
2001–2002	Crvena Stijena		
2002–2003	Mornar	27	(12)
2003–2005	Kom	48	(14)
2004	→ Mornar (loan)	4	(0)
2005	Dečić	18	(7)
2006	Čelik Zenica	15	(2)
2007–2008	Grbalj		
2008–2009	Zeta	26	(6)
2009–2010	Berane	28	(2)
2010–2012	Novi Pazar	54	(14)
2012–2013	Grbalj	30	(7)
2013–2014	Čelik Nikšić	30	(6)
2014–2015	Mladost Podgorica	30	(8)
2015	Lovćen	17	(6)
2016	Mladost Velika Obarska		
2016	Kom		
2017	Mladost Lješkopolje		
- * Club domestic league appearances and goals as of 6 August 2016

Miloš Đalac (Cyrillic: Милош Ђалац, born 17 October 1982) is a Montenegrin retired football striker who last played for Mladost Lješkopolje.

== Club career ==
After starting his career with FK Crvena Stijena, he played with FK Mornar before signing in 2003 with FK Kom playing in the 2003–04 First League of Serbia and Montenegro. He will have a short spell with FK Dečić before moving in January 2006 to NK Čelik Zenica playing in the Premier League of Bosnia and Herzegovina. In January 2007 he returns to Montenegro signing with OFK Grbalj. He will also play with two more clubs in the Montenegrin First League, FK Zeta and FK Berane, before moving to Serbia in 2010 and signing with FK Novi Pazar playing in the Serbian First League, Serbian second tier. In 2012, he returned to Montenegro to play for Grbalj. After one season at Čelik Nikšić, he signed for Mladost Podgorica. In 2015 his contract with Mladost expired, and he joined Lovćen on a free transfer.

== Honours ==
Mladost Podgorica

- Montenegrin Cup: 2015
