= Radanović =

Radanović (Cyrillic script: Радановић) is surname derived from a masculine given name Radan. It may refer to:

- Dejana Radanović (born 1996), Serbian tennis player
- Ljubomir Radanović (born 1960), football defender
- Miloš Radanović (born 1980), football goalkeeper
- Siniša Radanović (born 1979), football defender
- Željka Radanović (born 1989), footballer

== See also ==
- George Radanovich, politician from California
- Radanovići (disambiguation)
