= Radinovići, Visoko =

Radinovići
- Village
- Location within Bosnia and Herzegovina
- Coordinates: 44.0315019°N 18.130862°E
- Country: Bosnia and Herzegovina
- Entity: Federation of Bosnia and Herzegovina
- Canton: Zenica-Doboj
- Municipality: Visoko

Area
  - Total: 0.11 sq mi (0.28 km^{2})

Population (2013)
  - Total: 472
  - Density: 4,400/sq mi (1,700/km^{2})
- Time zone: UTC+1 (CET)
  - Summer (DST): UTC+2 (CEST)

Radinovići is a village in the municipality of Visoko, Bosnia and Herzegovina. It is located on the western banks of the River Bosna, between Donje Moštre and Okolišće.

== Demographics ==
According to the 2013 census, its population was 472.

Ethnicity in 2013
Ethnicity	Number	Percentage
Bosniaks	461	97.7%
other/undeclared	11	2.3%
Total	472	100%
