= Radinovići, Zenica =

Village in Federation of Bosnia

Radinovići
- Village
- Location within Bosnia and Herzegovina
- Coordinates: 44.2259725°N 18.0658253°E
- Country: Bosnia and Herzegovina
- Entity: Federation of Bosnia and Herzegovina
- Canton: Zenica-Doboj
- Municipality: Zenica

Area
  - Total: 2.91 km^{2} (1.12 sq mi)

Population (2013)
  - Total: 180
  - Density: 62/km^{2} (160/sq mi)
- Time zone: UTC+1 (CET)
  - Summer (DST): UTC+2 (CEST)

Radinovići is a village in the municipality of Zenica, Bosnia and Herzegovina. It is located on the slopes of Lastavica mountain, east of the city.

== Demographics ==
According to the 2013 census, population of Radinovići was 180, all ethnic Bosniaks.

Ethnicity in 2013
Ethnicity	Number	Percentage
Bosniaks	180	100.0%
Total	180	100%
