= Okolišće =

- Village
- Location within Bosnia and Herzegovina
- Coordinates: 44.0329482°N 18.1257004°E
- Country: Bosnia and Herzegovina
- Entity: Federation of Bosnia and Herzegovina
- Canton: Zenica-Doboj
- Municipality: Visoko

Area
  - Total: 0.21 sq mi (0.55 km^{2})

Population (2013)
  - Total: 281
  - Density: 1,300/sq mi (510/km^{2})
- Time zone: UTC+1 (CET)
  - Summer (DST): UTC+2 (CEST)

Okolišće is a village in the municipality of Visoko, Bosnia and Herzegovina.

== Demographics ==
According to the 2013 census, its population was 281, all Bosniaks.
