= Darko Zorić =

Montenegrin footballer

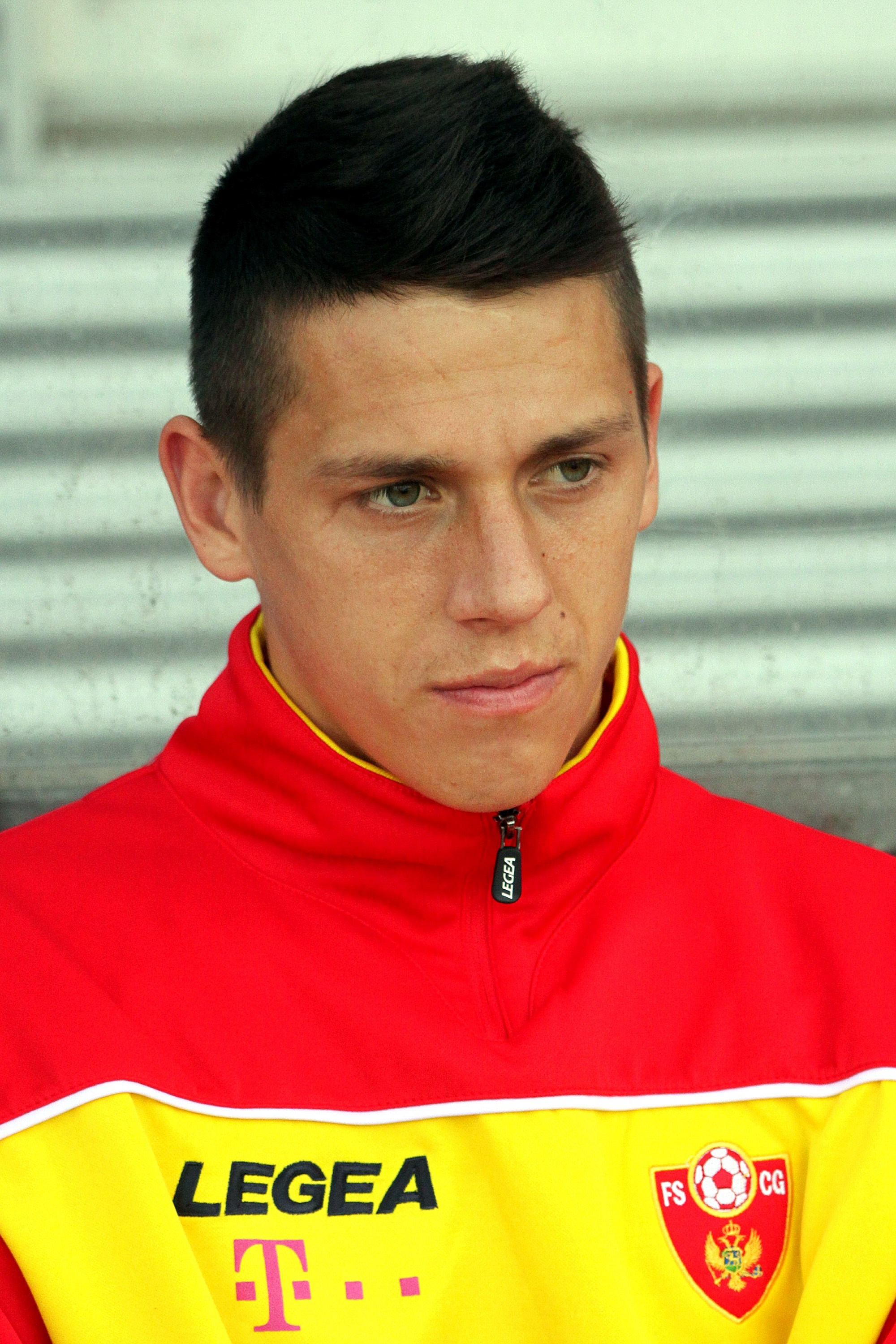
- Zorić with Montenegro in 2014

Personal information
- Date of birth: 12 September 1993 (age 33)
- Place of birth: Nikšić, FR Yugoslavia
- Height: 1.87 m (6 ft 1 1/2 in)
- Position: Attacking midfielder

Team information
- Current team: Mornar
- Number: 18

Youth career
- –2010: Sutjeska Nikšić

Senior career*
Years	Team	Apps	(Gls)
2010–2011	Sutjeska Nikšić	7	(0)
2011–2014	Čelik Nikšić	54	(16)
2014–2017	AEK Athens	19	(3)
2015–2016	→ Borac Čačak (loan)	25	(4)
2017–2018	Čukarički	44	(3)
2019–2021	Okzhetpes	40	(6)
2022	Kyzylzhar	35	(11)
2023–2024	Dečić	23	(2)
2024	Mornar	17	(5)
2025	Kyzylzhar	11	(3)
2025-	Mornar	27	(6)

International career^{‡}
2013–2014	Montenegro U21	8	(1)
2014	Montenegro	4	(1)
- * Club domestic league appearances and goals as of 17 June 2026 ‡ National team caps and goals as of 14 October 2018

Darko Zorić (Serbian Cyrillic: Дарко Зорић; born 12 September 1993) is a Montenegrin professional footballer who plays as an attacking midfielder for Mornar.

== Club career ==
=== Early career ===
Zorić made his professional debut with Sutjeska Nikšić in 2010 at the age of 17. After just playing seven games with Sutjeska, he transferred to city rivals Čelik Nikšić, with whom Zorić would reach two Montenegrin Cup finals. Throughout the winter of 2013–2014, negotiations took place between Zorić and Inter Milan and Red Star Belgrade.

=== AEK Athens ===
On 11 February 2014, it was announced that Zorić signed a contract with AEK Athens, but would play the rest of the 2013–14 season with Čelik before moving to AEK in July 2014. It was reported that Dušan Bajević tipped off the Greek club into recruiting Zorić. After almost three years with the club, he agreed to terminate his contract with AEK on 4 January 2017.

==== Loan to Borac Čačak ====
On 31 August 2015, Zorić joined Serbian side Borac Čačak on loan, coached by Nenad Lalatović at the time. On December 2, 2015, Zorić scored a hat-trick and made two assists in a 1-5 upset which eliminated heavily favored Red Star Belgrade in the second round of the 2015-16 Serbian Cup.

=== Čukarički ===
In early January 2017, Zorić signed a 2.5-year contract with Serbian team Čukarički, managed by his same coach from Borac Čačak, Nenad Lalatović. He made his debut for Čukarički on January 21, 2017, in a friendly match with BSK Borča which Čukarički won 9–0. On February 1, 2019, Čukarički agreed with Zorić to terminate his contract.

=== Okzhetpes ===
On 4 February 2019, Zorić signed a one-year contract with Kazakh club FC Okzhetpes, with an option for a one-year extension.

== International career ==
Zorić debuted at the age of 20 for the Montenegro national football team on May 23, 2014, in a 2–0 loss against Slovakia under coach Branko Brnović. He has, as of 20 October 2020, earned a total of 4 caps, scoring 1 goal.

=== International goals ===
Scores and results list Montenegro's goal tally first.

No.	Date	Venue	Opponent	Score	Result	Competition
1.	14 October 2018	LFF Stadium, Vilnius, Lithuania	Lithuania	4–0	4–1	2018–19 UEFA Nations League C

== Honours ==
Čelik

- Montenegrin Cup: 2011–12

AEK Athens

- Football League: 2014-2015(South Group)
