= Milan Đurišić =

Montenegrin footballer

Personal information
- Full name: Milan Đurišić
- Date of birth: 11 April 1987 (age 39)
- Place of birth: Titograd, SFR Yugoslavia
- Height: 1.86 m (6 ft 1 in)
- Position: Right back

Youth career
- 1999–2003: Budućnost Podgorica

Senior career*
Years	Team	Apps	(Gls)
2003–2010	Budućnost Podgorica	147	(16)
2004–2005	→ Mladost Podgorica (loan)	14	(2)
2005–2006	→ Kom (loan)	22	(6)
2010	Mladost Podgorica	15	(8)
2011	→ Rijeka (loan)	9	(0)
2011–2012	Mladost Podgorica	17	(2)
2012–2014	Lovćen	55	(14)
2013–2014	→ Mogren (loan)	32	(9)
2015–2018	Mladost Podgorica	93	(10)
2018	Budućnost Podgorica	31	(1)
2019–2022	Iskra Danilovgrad	85	(10)

International career
2007	Montenegro U21	5	(0)
- * Club domestic league appearances and goals as of 28 February 2019

Milan Đurišić (born 11 April 1987) is a Montenegrin footballer who plays as a right back.
