= OFK Bar =

- Full name: Omladinski fudbalski klub Bar
- Founded: 2001
- Dissolved: 2012
- Ground: Stadion Topolica
- Capacity: 2,500
Home colours	Away colours

Omladinski fudbalski klub Bar was a Montenegrin football club based in the town of Bar. The club existed from 2001 to 2012.

== History ==
OFK Bar were founded in 2001 and played their home games at the Stadion Topolica.
At season 2008–09, OFK Bar won the champions title in the Montenegrin Third League. A year later, as a second-placed team from Second League, the club gained promotion to the Montenegrin First League, which was a historical success of OFK Bar. At that season (2010-11), for the first time in history, the city of Bar had two teams in the First League. OFK Bar and FK Mornar played three games (1–0, 0–1, 1-1). OFK Bar finished the season in last position under manager Zlatko Kostić, which meant relegation to the Montenegrin Second League. At the same season, OFK Bar made the best result in the Montenegrin Cup, with participation in the quarterfinals.

During the winter 2012, as a member of the Second League, OFK Bar was dissolved due to financial problems.

=== First League Record ===
OFK Bar played in Montenegrin First League on season 2010–11.

Season	Pos	G	W	D	L	GF	GA
2010–11	12	33	7	11	15	30	43

== Honours and achievements ==
- Montenegrin Second League – 0
  - runners-up (1): 2009–10
- Montenegrin Third League – 1
  - winners (1): 2008–09

== Players ==
=== Final squad ===
Below is the squad which played for OFK Bar during the season 2011–12.

Note: Flags indicate national team as defined under FIFA eligibility rules; some limited exceptions apply. Players may hold more than one non-FIFA nationality.

No.	Pos.	Nation	Player
—	GK	MNE	Adnan Crnovršanin
—	GK	MNE	Stefan Popović
—	DF	MNE	Edmir Aručević
—	DF	MNE	Slobodan Čabarkapa
—	DF	MNE	Damir Ferhatović
—	DF	MNE	Erhan Hamza
—	DF	SRB	Dušan Krstić
—	DF	MNE	Nemanja Knežević

No.	Pos.	Nation	Player
—	DF	MNE	Nemanja Šćekić
—	MF	MNE	Srdjan Klačar
—	MF	MNE	Enis Hamzić
—	MF	MNE	Aleksandar Bezmarević
—	MF	SRB	Denis Džanović
—	MF	MNE	Edi Kujović
—	MF	MNE	Amir Ramović

=== Notable players ===
For the list of former players with Wikipedia article, please see Category:OFK Bar players.

== See also ==
- Stadion Topolica
- Bar
- Mornar Bar
