= Pavle Radovanović =

Montenegrin international referee (born 1975)

- Full name: Pavle Radovanović
- Born: 21 August 1975 (age 51); Yugoslavia

Domestic
Years	League	Role

International
Years	League	Role
2008–	FIFA listed	Referee

Pavle Radovanović (Serbian Cyrillic: Павле Радовановић; born 21 August 1975) is a Montenegrin international referee who refereed at 2014 FIFA World Cup qualifiers.
