= Radanovići, Kotor =

Radanovići Радановићи
- Town
- Location within Montenegro
- Country: Montenegro
- Region: Coastal
- Municipality: Kotor

Population (2011)
  - Total: 752
- Time zone: UTC+1 (CET)
  - Summer (DST): UTC+2 (CEST)

Radanovići (Montenegrin Cyrillic: Радановићи) is a small town in the municipality of Kotor, Montenegro. The town is the largest settlement of the historical rural region of Grbalj in the coastal region of Montenegro. The town of Radanovići is located near the main road between Budva and the Bay of Kotor region.

== Demographics ==
The settlement has a population of 752 inhabitants, according 2011 census, and is mainly populated by Serbs (63.69%), with a significant population of Montenegrins (21.14%)

== Transport ==
The town of Radanovići is situated approximately halfway between two main Montenegrin tourist destinations, Budva and Kotor, on the main road that connects these two. Tivat Airport is 7.5 km (4.6 mi) away, and there are regular flights to Belgrade throughout the year, and dozens of charter planes land daily at the airport during the summer season.

== Sports ==
Local football team OFK Grbalj play at Stadion Donja Sutvara and currently compete in the Montenegrin First League.
