= Stadion Željezare =

Football stadium in Nikšić, Montenegro

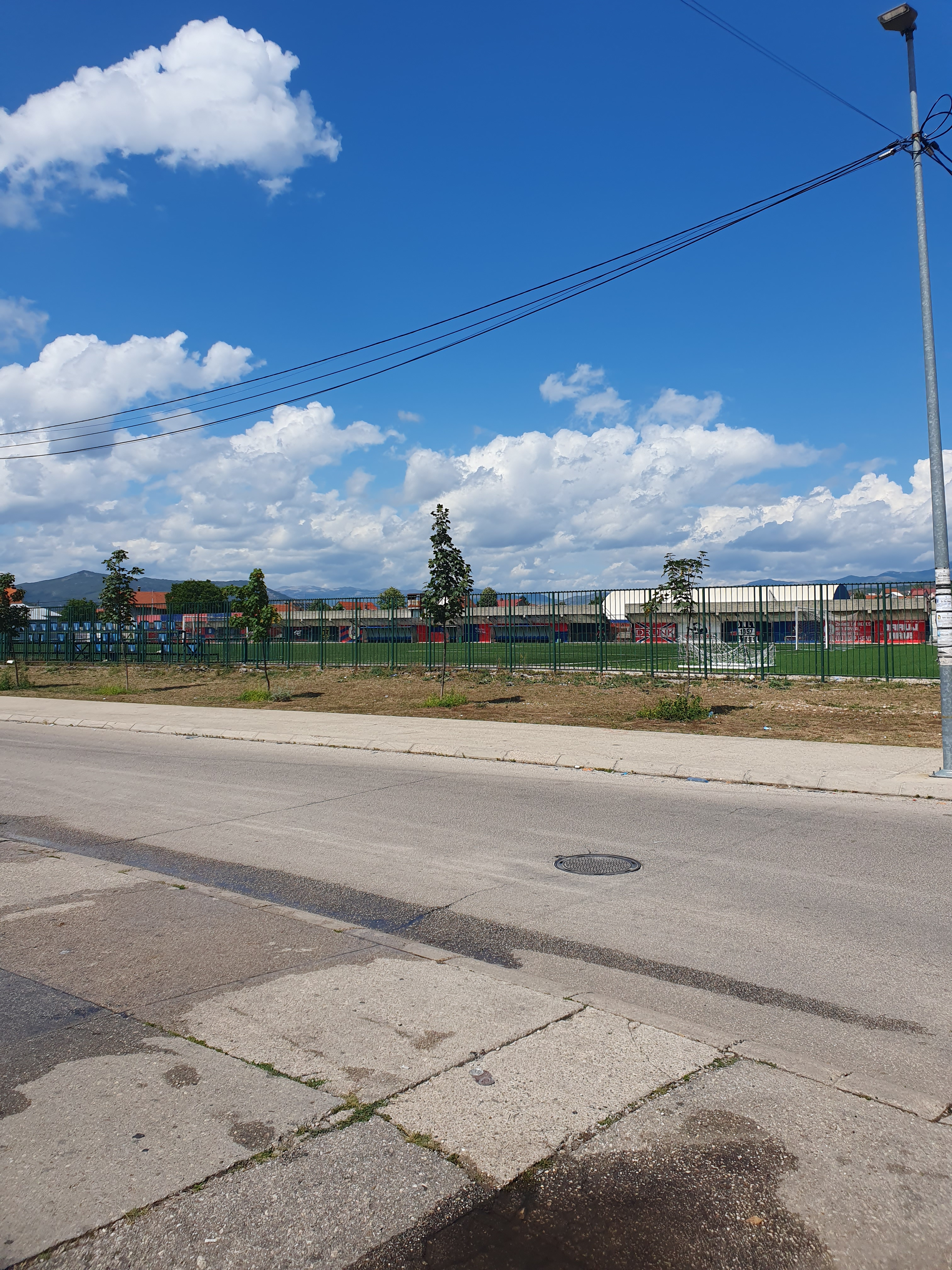
- Interactive map of Stadion Željezare
- Full name: Stadion Željezare
- Location: Nikšić, Montenegro
- Coordinates: 42.7849°N 18.9517°E
- Owner: City of Nikšić
- Capacity: 2,000
- Surface: grass
- Field size: 105 x 65 meters

Construction
- Built: 1957
- Expanded: 1995

Tenant
- FK Čelik Nikšić

Stadion Željezare is a football stadium in Nikšić, Montenegro. It is situated near the bigger FK Sutjeska Stadium. It is used for football matches. The stadium is the home ground of FK Čelik Nikšić.

== History ==
The stadium was built during the 1950s, with the born of FK Čelik. Until the 21st century, the owner of the stadium was steel-mill Nikšić.
Following successful results of FK Čelik and promotion to the Montenegrin First League, in 2012, the owners made all-seated stands at Stadion Željezare.

== Pitch and conditions ==
The pitch measures 105 x 65 meters. The stadium didn't met UEFA criteria for European competitions, so FK Čelik played their European matches on neighbouring FK Sutjeska Stadium.
In front of the main stadium is one field with artificial turf, used by FK Čelik and FK Sutjeska.

== See also ==
- FK Čelik Nikšić
- Nikšić
- Stadion Gradski (Nikšić)
