= FK Čelik Nikšić =

Čelik Nikšić Челик Никшић
- Full name: Fudbalski Klub Čelik Nikšić; Фудбалски клуб Челик Никшић
- Nickname(s): Metalurzi
- Founded: 1957; 68 years ago
- Ground: Stadion Željezare, Nikšić, Montenegro
- Capacity: 2,000
- Head Coach: Dražen Međedović
- League: Montenegrin Third League
Home colours	Away colours

Fudbalski Klub Čelik Nikšić (Montenegrin: Фудбалски клуб Челик Никшић) is a football club based in Nikšić, Montenegro. Founded in september 1957, they currently compete in the Montenegrin Third League. The team once won the Montenegrin Cup trophy and played three seasons in the UEFA Europa League.

== History ==
=== Yugoslav era (1957–1991) ===
FK Čelik was established in 1957, following the bankruptcy of former FK Javorak. The name "Čelik" was given in memory of Petar Saveljić, who had worked at the local steel mill before playing football with Savo Pejović.

First seasons of their existence, Čelik spent in the lowest-tier competition (Titogradski podsavez). First successes for Čelik came with the beginning of sixties. On 1961, as a member of Fourth League, the team won the Montenegrin Republic Cup. The same year, Čelik debuted in the Montenegrin Republic League (third level). Significant success came on season 1967–68. As a runner-up of Republic League, Čelik gained its first-ever promotion to the Yugoslav Second League. In that competition, Čelik played its first official games against Nikšić strongest-side FK Sutjeska and notable Montenegrin team FK Budućnost, but they were relegated, with scores of four wins, six draws and 20 defeats.

During the 1970s and 1980s, FK Čelik was a permanent member of Montenegrin Republic League, with two seasons finishing as a runner-up (1981–82, 1984–85).

=== Yugoslav breakup era (1992–2006) ===
On 1992, after the breakup of SFR Yugoslavia, FK Čelik started to play in the football system of newly formed FR Yugoslavia. With the support of Nikšić steel mill, the team gained promotion to 1996–97 Yugoslav Second League. In the Second League, Čelik played one of their best seasons – finishing as a third-placed team, only five points behind the First League promotion. Same season (1996–97), Čelik won their second Montenegrin Republic Cup.

From 1996 to 2004, FK Čelik spent eight consecutive seasons in Yugoslav / Serbia and Montenegro Second League. On season 1997/98, they were close to First League promotion, but failed to qualify, finished with only one point less than first-placed Mogren.

=== Independence era (2006–) ===
Following the independence of Montenegro, FK Čelik became a member of the Montenegrin Second League inaugural season (2006–07). Finishing in second place in the 2007–08 season, the team participated in the First League playoffs. Their rival in that stage was local side FK Sutjeska. Two playoff games watched more than 17,000 spectators and Čelik didn't succeed to gain promotion (0:0, 0:1).

In the 2011–12 season, FK Čelik won the Second League, making few all-time records – most points by single-season (80), highest number of wins (25), or longest unbeaten run (23 games) and longest winning streak (10 games).

During the same season, FK Čelik became the first-ever and only Montenegrin Second League member which won the Montenegrin Cup. On the road to the final, they eliminated Blue Star (2:0), Lovćen (1:0, 1:0), Bokelj (1:1, 1:0) and Jedinstvo (3:0, 0:1). In the finals, on 23 May 2012, FK Čelik defeated First-League side Rudar – 2:1 (2:0) and won their very first and, by now, the only national trophy.

Winning the cup allowed the club to enter the 2012–13 UEFA Europa League qualifying phase, where they beat Bosnian powerhouse Borac Banja Luka on away goals (1:1, 2:2). Facing Ukrainian club Metalurh Donetsk in the second qualifying round, the team garnered even more attention from the local media as the players and staff traveled from Nikšić to Donetsk (2,143 kilometers) by bus, which, after being denied entry to Moldova, lasted approximately 70 hours on the road. The team, having arrived in Donetsk on the same day of the match, lost the first leg 7–0, giving Metalurh its most historic win in UEFA competition. While Čelik played with much more resistance in the second leg, the team was eliminated from the UEFA Europa League after the game ended 2–4 for Metalurh.

Soon after their European debut, FK Čelik started their first-ever season in Montenegrin First League. They won third-place, behind Montenegrin strongest teams Sutjeska and Budućnost, but also played in the final of 2012–13 Montenegrin Cup. This time, FK Čelik was defeated by FK Budućnost (0–1).

With that results, team from Nikšić played another European season, in 2013–14 UEFA Europa League. Their opponent was Hungarian side Budapest Honvéd FC (1–4; 0–9).

Next year, FK Čelik again won third place in the First League, with another performance in 2014–15 UEFA Europa League qualifying. This time, they faced Koper from Slovenia (0–5; 0–4).

Before the start of the 2014–15 season, the club informed the Football Association of Montenegro that because of financial problems it would not be able to play the 2014–15 season in the top flight, and re-emerged in the Montenegrin Third League.

After two seasons in the lowest-tier, FK Čelik gained promotion to the 2016–17 Second League. In March 2018, the club was on the brink of collapse and they were relegated from the Montenegrin Third League in 2019, effectively ending the club's existence.

In 2022, the club was refounded by supporters and a former footballers and in the 2022–23 season competes in the lowest tier, the Montenegrin Third League.

== Statistics ==
=== First League Record ===
For the first time, FK Čelik played in Montenegrin First League on season 2012–13. Below is a list of FK Čelik scores in First League by every single season.

Season	Pos	G	W	D	L	GF	GA
2012–13	3	33	15	8	10	41	35
2013–14	3	33	15	9	9	47	28

=== European competitions ===
Season	Competition	Round	Club	Home	Away	Agg.
2012-13	2012-13 UEFA Europa League	1QR	(Bosnia and Herzegovina) Borac Banja Luka	1–1	2–2	3–3 (a)
2012-13	2012-13 UEFA Europa League	2QR	(Ukraine) Metalurh Donetsk	2–4	0–7	2–11
2013-14	2013-14 UEFA Europa League	1QR	(Hungary) Honvéd	1–4	0–9	1–13
2014-15	2014–15 UEFA Europa League	1QR	(Slovenia) Koper	0–5	0–4	0–9

== Honours and achievements ==
- Montenegrin Cup – 1
  - winners (1): 2011–12
  - runners-up (1): 2012–13
- Montenegrin Second League – 1
  - winners (1): 2011–12
  - runners-up (1): 2007–08
- Montenegrin Republic League – 0
  - runners-up (4): 1967–68, 1981–82, 1984–85, 1995–96
- Montenegrin Republic Cup – 2
  - winners (2): 1960–61, 1996–97

== Players ==
=== Current squad ===
Note: Flags indicate national team as defined under FIFA eligibility rules; some limited exceptions apply. Players may hold more than one non-FIFA nationality.

No.	Pos.	Nation	Player

=== Notable players ===
For the list of former players with Wikipedia article, see: FK Čelik Nikšić players.

Below is the list of players which, during their career, played for Čelik and represented their countries at the full international level.

- (Serbia and Montenegro) Zoran Banović
- (Serbia and Montenegro) Bojan Brnović
- (Serbia and Montenegro) (Montenegro) Vukašin Poleksić
- (Montenegro) Darko Bulatović
- (Montenegro) Ivan Ivanović
- (Montenegro) Marko Vučić
- (Montenegro) Nikola Vujović
- (Montenegro) Darko Zorić
- (Bosnia and Herzegovina) Elmir Kuduzović

== Supporters and rivalries ==
FAP Mašina is the popular name for the Čelik ultras. They have been established in 2001 in Nikšić. Their main rival is FK Sutjeska Nikšić, with whom they contest the Nikšić derby.

== Stadium ==
FK Čelik plays their home games at Stadion Željezare, which is located near the FK Sutjeska Stadium. There are two stands on Stadion Željezare with an overall capacity of 2,000 seats.

== See also ==
- Montenegrin clubs in Yugoslav football competitions (1946–2006)
- Nikšić
