= Stadion Topolica =

Stadium in Bar, Montenegro

Coordinates: 42°06′16″N 19°05′24″E

Stadium Topolica
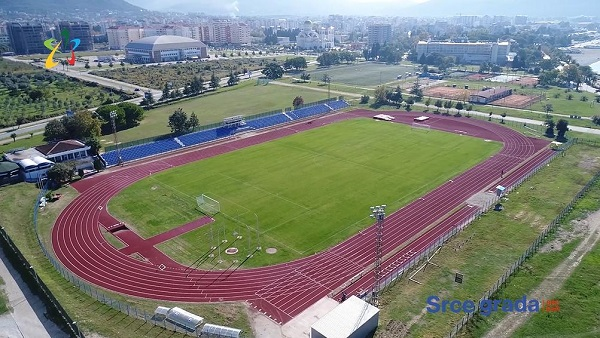
- Interactive map of Stadium Topolica
- Full name: Stadium Topolica
- Location: Bar, Montenegro
- Owner: SRC Bar
- Capacity: 2,200
- Surface: grass
- Field size: 110 m × 70 m (360 ft × 230 ft)

Construction
- Renovated: 2019

Tenants
- FK Mornar; FK Sloga Bar

Website
- https://srcegrada.me/en/

Stadion Topolica (Topolica Stadium) is a multi-use stadium in Bar, Montenegro. It is used mostly for football matches and athletics. The stadium has a capacity of 2,500 seats and is a part of Sports Center Bar company.

== History ==
The sports complex was originally built during the 1980s. There are three football pitches, and main stadium has a capacity of 2,500 seats. Among the other facilities, the main ground has floodlights and an athletic track. Topolica Sport Hall is located next to the stadium.
The stadium is located at the coast of Adriatic Sea, near the city beach and the Port of Bar.
During the winter months, because of good climate and accommodation, it is used for exhibition matches, tournaments, trainings and preparations of many football and athletic teams from the region (Montenegro, Serbia, North Macedonia, Albania, Kosovo, Bosnia and Herzegovina and Croatia).

== Pitch ==
The pitch measures 110 x 70 meters. Among other facilities, there are floodlights and an athletic track.
Another stadium in Sports Complex Madžarica has smaller dimensions and a capacity of 2,000 seats and meets the standards for Montenegrin Third League games.

== Tenants ==
Stadion Topolica is home of four football teams and one athletic team. The main user is FK Mornar, and except them, the ground is often used by lower-league members FK Sloga and FK Hajduk. Also, their home games on Stadium Madžarica plays ŽFK Pristan (women's football). The stadium hosts training and events of Athletic Club Mornar, too.
Since 1994, the stadium hosts traditional International Athletic Meeting.

== See also ==
- Topolica Sport Hall
- FK Mornar
- FK Sloga
- Bar
