= FK Zabjelo =

- Full name: Fudbalski klub Zabjelo
- Nickname: Republikanci (Republicans)
- Founded: 1963
- Ground: Zabjelo Stadium; Podgorica, Montenegro
- Capacity: 750
- League: Montenegrin Third League
- 2024–25: Montenegrin Third League, 1st of 11
Home colours	Away colours

Fudbalski klub Zabjelo (English: Football Club Zabjelo) is a Montenegrin football club based in Zabjelo, a suburb of Podgorica. The club continues to compete in Montenegro’s regional football system and operates a youth academy, with support from local partners and sponsors such as Merdian Holdings.They currently compete in the Montenegrin Third League.

== History ==
=== Period 1963-1999 ===
The team was founded in 1963 as FK Tara Titograd, named after one of the most powerful Yugoslav transport companies at that time. During their first seasons, Tara played in the Fourth League - Central region (lowest rank in SFR Yugoslavia). First significant success, the team made in the 1966–67 season, by winning the champion title in the Fourth League - Central, which gained them first-ever promotion to the Montenegrin Republic League (Third rank).
After only two seasons in the Republic League, FK Tara made another historical success. In the 1968–69 season, after the hard struggle against FK Rudar and FK Arsenal, Tara finished as a first-placed team, which gained them promotion to the Yugoslav Second League. With that result, FK Tara became the third team from Podgorica which played in Yugoslav top two divisions, after FK Budućnost and FK Mladost.
On their debut in the Yugoslav Second League (season 1969–70), FK Tara played against some of well-known national sides, like FK Budućnost, FK Sutjeska or NK GOŠK. After 30 weeks, with 21 points won, Tara finished as a 16th placed team, which meant relegation to the Republic League.
In summer 1970, the club was renamed to FK Zabjelo and all the time until the last years of century spent in third or fourth rank of domestic competitions.

=== Period 1999- ===
FK Zabjelo finished the 1999–2000 season as a runner-up in the Montenegrin Republic League. So, together with the champion-side FK Iskra, they were promoted to the Yugoslav Second League.
On their first comeback to Second League after 30 years (season 2000-01), Zabjelo finished 7th place. Next season, again, FK Zabjelo finished in the middle of the table, and season was remembered by big games against most popular Montenegrin side FK Budućnost. FK Zabjelo played three matches against Budućnost, with historical victory on last-week game (1:0). Previously, game of 8th week between Zabjelo and Budućnost (1:1) was attended by 3,000 spectators, which was the highest attendance in history of Zabjelo Stadium. Finishing as a last-placed team, with only 14 points earned, FK Zabjelo was relegated from the Second League on season 2002–03.
After Montenegrin independence, FK Zabjelo became a member of the Montenegrin Second League inaugural season.
Greatest result in that competition, with the best performance in team's history, FK Zabjelo made in the 2012-13 season, finishing third place. That gained them first-ever participation in the playoffs for the Montenegrin First League, where they met former national champion FK Mogren. As Zabjelo Stadium didn't meet highest national criteria, the first game was played on Camp FSCG stadium on 6 June 2013. In front of 2,000 spectators, FK Zabjelo was defeated with score 1–6, and FK Mogren won the second game in Budva, too (3-1).
Only two seasons after unsuccessful performance in the First League playoffs, FK Zabjelo was relegated from the Second League (2014–15). Today, they are members of the Montenegrin Third League.

== Honours and achievements ==
- Montenegrin Republic League – 1
  - winners (1): 1968–69
  - runner-up (1): 1999–00
- Montenegrin Fourth League – 6
  - winners (6): 1966–67, 1976–77, 1980–81, 1991–92, 2004–05, 2005–06

== Current squad ==
Note: Flags indicate national team as defined under FIFA eligibility rules; some limited exceptions apply. Players may hold more than one non-FIFA nationality.

No.	Pos.	Nation	Player
63	GK	MNE	Rijad Džafić
2	DF	MNE	Nemanja Debeljević
14	MF	JPN	Kazuki Mera
19		MNE	Andrija Gluščević
6		MNE	Aldin Muradbašić
8		MNE	Vladimir Vratnica
4		MNE	Janko Dedić
24	GK	MNE	Danilo Vujović
15		MNE	Luka Petričević
3	FW	MNE	Aleksandar Krivokapić
10		MNE	Mirko Raičević
17		MNE	Miloš Vukčević

No.	Pos.	Nation	Player
20	FW	MNE	Blažo Džankić
12	GK	MNE	Nikola Peličić
18		MNE	Dušan Radović
11		MNE	Bogdan Jošanović
9		MNE	Matija Prelević
13		MNE	Miloš Nikolić
21		MNE	Andrija Perišić
7		MNE	Pavle Raičević
23		MNE	Mario Gojčević
25		MNE	Miloš Knežević
30		MNE	Matija Šofranac
16	DF	MNE	Nikša Stanišić

== Supporters ==
FK Zabjelo is among the lowest-division teams from Podgorica with the strong supporters' base. Supporters' group named Zabjelo Republika (Republic of Zabjelo) was founded in 1991. As an urban-subculture group, active as an organiser of local actions, TV shows, cultural or ecological events, they are active on FK Zabjelo games since the beginning of the nineties. Often recognized as a protagonists of incidents on lower-league games, Zabjelo Republica members are attending FK Zabjelo games wherever they play.

== Stadium ==
FK Zabjelo plays their home games at Zabjelo Stadium. Built in 1973, the stadium has a capacity of 750 seats, and it's situated near the Morača riverbank.

== See also ==
- Zabjelo Stadium
- Montenegrin Third League
- Football in Montenegro
- Montenegrin clubs in Yugoslav football competitions (1946–2006)
- Podgorica
