= FK Mornar =

Mornar Bar
- Full name: Fudbalski Klub Mornar Bar
- Founded: 1923; 103 years ago
- Ground: Stadion Topolica
- Capacity: 2,500
- Chairman: Mitar Novaković
- Manager: Vesko Stešević
- League: Montenegrin First League
- 2025–26: Montenegrin First League, 2nd of 10
- Website: fkmornarbar.me
Home colours	Away colours

FK Mornar Bar is a Montenegrin professional football club based in the coastal town of Bar, which competes in the Montenegrin First League.

The club achieved its greatest success in 2026, when it defeated FK Dečić 1–0 in the final of the Montenegrin Cup.

== History ==
FK Mornar (FC Sailor) was founded in December 1923, as JSK Crnojević. In period until 1941, since the 1924–25 season, the club played for a few seasons in the Montenegrin football championship (former Zeta Banovina), but without any significant success.

From 1945, the club participated under several names - Jadran, Obnova and Tempo. The first significant successes the club made was in the 1950 season were they got promoted to the Montenegrin Republic League. From 1950 to 2006, Mornar played numerous seasons in the Republic League and won three titles (1989, 1995, 2001). In the 1994–95 season, FK Mornar made "double" on Republic level, by winning both titles - in the Montenegrin Republic League, and the Montenegrin Republic Cup.

For the first time, Mornar played in Yugoslav leagues in the 1989–90 season, as a member of the Yugoslav Third Inter-Republic League - West. In the 1995-96 season, Mornar debuted in the Yugoslav Second League, where they spent six seasons until 2006.

Historical success Mornar made in summer 2009, with their first promotion to the Montenegrin First League. Until now, the club from Bar played seven seasons in the highest league competition in Montenegro, but without any significant result. On 2018-19 Montenegrin First League, Mornar made an Prva CFL all-time negative record, as they earned only 12 points on 36 games, but with only one single victory during the whole campaign. That year, team from Bar suffered 12 defeats in a row, which is the longest losing streak in the history of Montenegrin top-tier.

=== First League record ===
For the first time, Mornar played in the Montenegrin First League in the 2009–10 season. Below is a list of FK Mornar scores in the First League by every single season.

Season	Pos	G	W	D	L	GF	GA
2009–10	10	33	9	8	16	29	49
2010–11	10	33	9	7	17	25	45
2012–13	11	33	9	9	15	36	47
2013–14	11	33	11	9	13	45	56
2014–15	10	33	9	5	19	32	63
2015–16	12	33	9	6	18	30	48
2018–19	10	36	1	9	26	17	72
2021–22	5	36	13	11	12	35	39
2022–23	8	36	11	9	16	30	41
2023–24	2	36	17	13	6	45	32
2024–25	5	36	12	8	16	40	53
2025–26	2	36	20	9	7	51	29

== European record ==
Season	Competition	Round	Club	Home	Away	Aggregate
2024–25	UEFA Conference League	1QR	(Georgia (country)) Dinamo Tbilisi	2–1	1–1	3–2
2024–25	UEFA Conference League	2QR	(Serbia) Radnički 1923	2–1 (a.e.t.)	0–1	2–2 (4–3 p)
2024–25	UEFA Conference League	3QR	(Hungary) Paks	2–2	0–3	2–5
2026–27	UEFA Conference League	1QR	(Andorra) Atlètic d'Escaldes	1–2	1–2	2–4

Notes

- QR: Qualifying round

== Honours and achievements ==
- Montenegrin First League
  - Runners–up (2): 2023–24, 2025–26
- Montenegrin Cup:
  - Winners (1): 2025–26
- Montenegrin Second League – 2
  - Winners (2): 2017–18, 2020–21
  - Runners-up (1): 2011–12
- Montenegrin Republic League – 3
  - Winners (3): 1988–89, 1994–95, 2000–01
- Montenegrin Republic Cup – 1
  - Winners (1): 1994–95

== Players ==
=== Current squad ===
As of 15 February 2026

Note: Flags indicate national team as defined under FIFA eligibility rules; some limited exceptions apply. Players may hold more than one non-FIFA nationality.

No.	Pos.	Nation	Player
3	DF	MNE	Marko Vučić
4	MF	MNE	Andrija Kaluđerović
7	FW	MNE	Stefan Denković
8	MF	SRB	Marko Đurišić
10	MF	MNE	Demir Škrijelj
11	FW	CIV	Yann Michael Yao
12	GK	MNE	Stefan Popović
13	GK	MNE	Vasilije Stojanović
14	DF	MNE	Nikola Vuković
15	DF	MNE	Jovan Baošić
16	DF	MNE	Filip Mitrović
17	MF	MNE	Jovan Dašić

No.	Pos.	Nation	Player
18	MF	MNE	Darko Zorić
19	MF	MNE	Petar Vukčević
21	FW	MNE	Matija Rovčanin
23	FW	MNE	Balša Dubljević
24	GK	MNE	Benjamin Kriještarac
25	DF	MNE	Ilija Martinović
32	MF	MNE	Velimir Ljutica
33	DF	MNE	Nikola Stijepović
94	MF	MNE	Nemanja Vlahović
97	FW	MNE	Nikola Vujnović
99	MF	MNE	Vukas Dragović

=== Notable players ===
Below is the list of former Mornar players who represented their countries at the full international level.

- (Socialist Federal Republic of Yugoslavia) Slobodan Marović
- (Serbia and Montenegro) Zoran Banović
- (Serbia and Montenegro) (Serbia) Nikola Žigić
- (Montenegro) Ivan Ivanović
- (Montenegro) Ivan Kecojević
- (Montenegro) Mitar Novaković
- (Montenegro) Srđan Radonjić
- (Ghana) Francis Bossman
- (Sierra Leone) Rodney Michael
- (Serbia) Milan Smiljanić

For the list of former and current players with Wikipedia article, please see Category:FK Mornar players.

== Managerial history ==
- (Montenegro) Ratko Stevović (June 2006 - June 2007)
- (Montenegro) Mladen Vukićević (June 2008 - January 2009)
- (Montenegro) Rudolf Marčić (January 2009 - June 2009)
- (Montenegro) Mladen Vukićević (June 2009 - January 2010)
- (Montenegro) Brajan Nenezić (5 January 2010 - June 2010)
- (Serbia) Dušan Jevrić (July 2010 - September 2010)
- (Montenegro) Boris Ljutica (29 September 2010 - August 2011)
- (Montenegro) Obren Sarić (22 August 2011 - September 2012)
- (Serbia) Zoran Pešić (September 2012)
- (Montenegro) Saša Petrović (30 September 2012 - April 2013)
- (Montenegro) Obren Sarić (24 April 2013 - June 2014)
- (Montenegro) Mladen Vukićević (July 2014 - June 2015)
- (Montenegro) Rudolf Marčić (July 2015 - Mar 2016)
- (Montenegro) Zoran Mijović (25 March 2016 - June 2017)
- (Montenegro) Rade Vešović (15 September 2017 - June 2018)
- (Montenegro) Aleksandar Madžar (9 July 2018 - September 2018)
- (Serbia) Goran Milojević (4 September 2018 - February 2019)
- (Montenegro) Derviš Hadžiosmanović (13 February 2019 - 16 February 2019)
- (Montenegro) Igor Raičević (16 February 2019 - 2019)
- (Montenegro) Obren Šarić (8 July 2019 - 27 October 2020)
- (Montenegro) Slavoljub Bubanja (3 November 2020 - 31 October 2021)
- (Montenegro) Andrija Delibašić (31 October 2021 - 30 April 2023)
- (Montenegro) Zoran Đurašković (2 May 2023 - September 2025)
- (Montenegro) Vesko Stešević (September 2025 - present)

== Stadium ==
FK Mornar plays its home games at Stadion Topolica, whose capacity is 2,500 seats. The stadium is built at the coast of Adriatic Sea, near the city beach and the Port of Bar. The stadium has floodlights, and except football, it's the main athletic field in Montenegro.

== See also ==
- Stadion Topolica
- Bar
- Montenegrin First League
- Montenegrin clubs in Yugoslav football competitions (1946–2006)
