= Rugby union in Montenegro =

- Governing body: Montenegrin Rugby Union
- Nickname: "Savez"
- Registered players: 50
- Clubs: 5

Club competitions
- Montenegro Championship; National Sevens Tournament National 10's Championship National Beach Rugby Tournament

Audience records
- Single match: 180

Rugby union in Montenegro is a minor but growing sport. The game has only recently been developed in the country since its independence in 2006. The governing body is the Montenegrin Rugby Union which was accepted as a member of Rugby Europe (previously FIRA-AER) at the 2014 convention held in Split, Croatia. It is affiliated with World Rugby since 2024.

== History ==
Traditionally, international rugby matches were played as FR Yugoslavia until 2003, and then as Serbia and Montenegro from 2003 to 2006.

In 2011, the Porto Montenegro company started playing organized touch rugby games. Participation numbers grew and the players progressed to rugby sevens. By 2013 there were four rugby clubs in Montenegro. This was started by Beckett Tucker, Oliver Corlette and Malcolm Blaxall and coached by Milos Kucancanin, Rambo Morrison Tavana Faaletino, David Lowe and Marty Lusty A regional league began in 2014 and fixtures were also arranged with other teams around the former Yugoslavian countries.

Rugby has competition from other popular sports such as water polo, association football, handball and mixed martial arts in Montenegro. Due to the small population of the country, the country is often competing against nations who have a larger population and larger player pool. The biggest rivalry in Montenegro is currently between the clubs Podgorica and Nikšić.

An official international sevens squad was named and sent to Greece for the ENC Division B competition in 2014 this was the first time an official national rugby team was sent by Montenegro.

The sport of rugby union really kicked off with the annual European Nation's Cup tournament in 2015 where the first official national side played their first match against Estonia in Bar, Montenegro. This was Montenegro's first stint as an independent nation competing in rugby union and the first time the country played at home. The match ended as a win for Montenegro. The following match was a final against Slovakia and ended in defeat.

Montenegro hosted the ENC 3 competition from the 15th to the 21st of May 2017. It was attended by Bulgaria and Slovakia to make it a three way tournament. The tournament ended with a loss to Slovakia and a win to Bulgaria which are World Rugby ranked opposition.

Montenegro played Turkey and Bulgaria in ENC 3 2018, with one game being at home and one being away. Montenegro lost to Bulgaria at home convincingly and put on a strong showing in Turkey narrowly losing buy a few points. At the sevens Montenegro put on a good showing but were unlucky not to win many games.

In the 2019 season Montenegro failed to take part in the ENC 3 against Turkey and Estonia but did well to secure a 12th place finish (out of 16 teams) at the sevens conference 1 held in Belgrade for 2019 and remain in the conference. Two kids rugby programs were also started in Podgorica and in Tivat. Which is a positive sign for the future that kids will be playing rugby earlier. As well positive news that rugby sevens will be making its debut at the GSSE in 2023 which is a stepping stone forward for smaller nations rugby programs.

== Clubs ==
As of 2022, the following clubs participate actively rugby in Montenegro:

- RFC Arsenal Tivat
- RK Mornar Bar
- RK Nikšić
- RK Podgorica
- RK Cetinje

== Inactive/defunct clubs ==
- RK Budućnost
- RK Krstaši
- RK Lovćen

The club's above are currently inactive due to the failure to partake in regular matches this season.

== National team ==
Montenegro's national teams are known as the Wolves (Vukovi). The country's first international rugby sevens matches were played in 2014 at the ENC Division B championship in Greece. The first match was against the favorites Switzerland, with the game ending with a final score of 15-36 to Switzerland. The team managed to win the bowl and get Montenegro's first achievement in rugby sevens. After a poor 2015 season where the team finished second to last the 2016 team had plenty to make up for. With that the team finished in the cup final with Malta and achieved promotion into Conference 1.

The Montenegro national 15-a-side team first played in April 2015 when the country hosted the European Nations Cup Division 3 Competition. On 10 April 2015 The Wolves played the first international match in the country's history, winning a thrilling encounter 29–27 against Estonia in Bar. In the Final Montenegro lost 31–3 against Slovakia in Budva.

Since then the team played in the second leg of that tournament by travelling up to Estonia to play the hosts Estonia. Estonia won, ending Montenegro's hope for promotion. The team defeated Belarus for their biggest ever victory in an international competition

For women's rugby it started off by an invitation to the Rugby Europe Division B tournament after the withdrawal of one of the teams in the tournament. They competed against favourites Denmark for their first match and lost heavily and were unlucky to not get a win in their debut tournament. The women's side got their first win against Bosnia and Herzegovina with the side finishing 12th of 16 teams. This was the first real result for the women's team.

Montenegro Men's XV played a 15's international test against Gibraltar. It was a poor performance from the men's side as they were heavily defeated 55-7. National caps were awarded.

In the 2017 ENC hosted by Montenegro the team lost the first match against Slovakia and won the following against Bulgaria. Each team had a victory and even though Montenegro had scored the most tries and had a better points difference Slovakia had gotten promotion through due to changes in Rugby Europe's tie breaker rules earlier in the year.

Montenegro sevens competed in Rugby Europe rugby sevens conference 1 in 2017 with a poor set of results due to external factors. With losses in all group matches and small margins in their playoff matches to stay in the conference, it ended a disappointing year for rugby in Montenegro.

In the 2018 season the national team played and lost their fixtures against Bulgaria and Turkey respectively.

Currently after the recent re-structuring in rugby europe the national team are playing in the south division 2 conference alongside Serbia, Bosnia and Turkey.

== See also ==
- Montenegro national rugby union team
- List of National Team Players
- Montenegro national rugby sevens team
- Montenegrin Rugby Union
