= List of football stadiums in Montenegro =

The following is a list of football stadiums in Montenegro, ranked in order of capacity, with the minimum capacity being 1,000.

== Current stadiums ==
#	Image	Stadium	Capacity	City	Home team	Opened	UEFA rank
1		Podgorica City Stadium	11,264	Podgorica	Montenegro, Budućnost	1945	3/4 stars
2		Berane City Stadium	7,466	Berane	Berane, Radnički Berane, Napredak	1981	
3		Nikšić City Stadium	5,214	Nikšić	Sutjeska Nikšić	1946	
4		Sveti Petar Cetinjski	5,192	Cetinje	Lovćen, Cetinje	1957	
5		Pljevlja City Stadium	5,140	Pljevlja	Rudar Pljevlja, Pljevlja 1997	1948	
6		Bijelo Polje City Stadium	4,000	Bijelo Polje	Jedinstvo	2005	
7		Trešnjica	4,000	Golubovci	Zeta	1996	
8		Bandžovo Brdo	3,000	Rožaje	Ibar	1946	
9		Topolica	2,500	Bar	Mornar	1980	
10		Braća Velašević	2,500	Danilovgrad	Iskra Danilovgrad	1947	
11		Pod Racinom	2,500	Plav	Jezero	1948	
12		Stadion u Parku	2,000	Tivat	Arsenal Tivat	1945	
13		Tuško Polje	2,000	Tuzi	Dečić	2006	
14		Željezara Stadium	2,000	Nikšić	Čelik Nikšić	1957	
15		Gusinje City Stadium	2,000	Gusinje	Gusinje, OFK Gusinje	1996	
16		Spuž City Stadium	1,700	Spuž	Zora	1955	
17		Mitar Mićo Goliš	1,630	Petrovac	OFK Petrovac	1969	
18		Solila	1,600	Igalo	Igalo 1929	1995	
19		DG Arena	1,500	Podgorica	OFK Mladost 1970	2018	
20		Mojkovac City Stadium	1,500	Mojkovac	Brskovo	2001	
21		Lugovi	1,500	Budva	Mogren	1960	
22		Donja Sutvara	1,500	Radanovići	OFK Grbalj	1995	
23		Stadion Olympic	1,500	Ulcinj	Otrant	1975	
24		Mladost Stadium	1,250	Podgorica	OFK Titograd	2007	
25		Zlatica	1,200	Podgorica	Kom	2016	
26		Camp FSCG Stadium	1,050	Podgorica	Ribnica, Grafičar Podgorica	2007	
27		Stadion pod Vrmcem	1,000	Kotor	Bokelj	1922	
28		Tološi Stadium	1,000	Podgorica	Crvena Stijena	1964	
29		Ravni Žabljak Stadium	1,000	Žabljak	OFK Durmitor	2001	
30		Stadion u Lugu	1,000	Kolašin	Gorštak	1927	
31		Bianca Stadium	1,000	Kolašin	Gorštak	1993	
32		Madžarica	1,000	Bar	Hajduk Bar, Sloga Bar	1980	
33		Gusare	1,000	Petnjica	Petnjica	1977	

== Former stadiums ==
Stadiums which have been demolished and no longer exist.

Stadium	Capacity	City	Home team	Opened	Demolished
Stadion Cvijetin Brijeg	1,500	Podgorica	OFK Titograd	1997	2008

== See also ==
- List of European stadiums by capacity
- List of association football stadiums by capacity
- Lists of stadiums
