= RK Herceg =

Bosnian rugby union club, based in Mostar

Herceg
- Full name: Rugby club Herceg
- Founded: 13 October 2011; 14 years ago
- Location: Mostar, Bosnia and Herzegovina
- Region: Herzegovina
- Ground: Stadion Raštani (Capacity: 500)
- President: Josip Vukoja
- Coach(es): Boris Aničić, Darko Rajič, Miro Boras
- League(s): Bosnia and Herzegovina rugby league (national 15s & 7s league), Adria 7s (regional league)
- 2016–17: 1st (Adria 7s)
1st kit	2nd kit

Rugby club Herceg (Croatian: Ragbi klub Herceg) is an amateur rugby union club based in the city of Mostar, Bosnia and Herzegovina. The club was founded in 2011 by a group of friends which previously never had contact with rugby. It competes in national leagues of Bosnia and Herzegovina and regional league Adria 7s, of which they are co-founders. Their home ground is Stadion Raštani, located in place of the same name, Raštani, Mostar suburb.

== History ==
=== 2011–12 ===
History of rugby club Herceg was made in mid-summer of 2011. Group of friends, while on barbecue, played football and their ball deflated. Since they did not have a way to inflate it, they took the deflated football ball in hands and started to play rugby. Of course, that first game was a version of some tackling game that they thought is rugby, but it was enough to spark an interest and set the foundation for future rugby club.

Rugby club Herceg was founded on 13 October 2011 by a same group of friends. Since there is no store selling rugby equipment in Bosnia and Herzegovina, first rugby ball they got from friends of a member from South Africa which said: "South Africa to Mostar". They spent their time researching and improving their knowledge of rugby using only Google and YouTube. This is where the internal joke started about "Youtube club". Soon after foundation they managed to get in touch with another rugby club, RK Tomislav from Tomislavgrad, which donated rugby equipment and other training aids. They improved their knowledge and rugby skills to the point that they decided it is time for next step, joining Rugby Federation of Bosnia and Herzegovina and all its competitions.

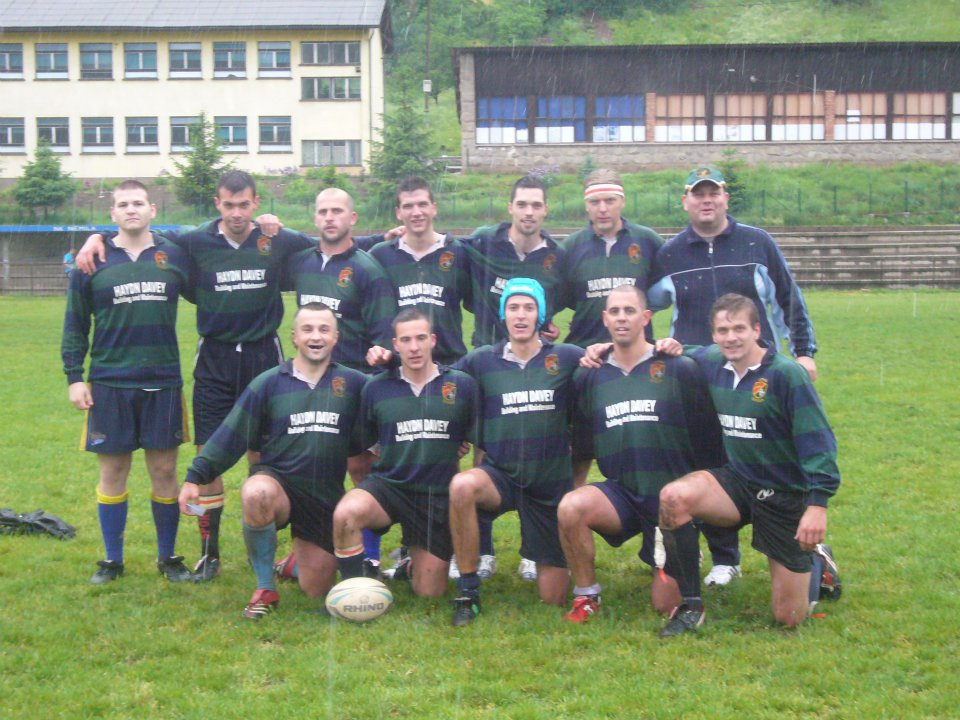
Rugby club Herceg after their first ever rugby game in Nemila, B&H, in 2012

First tournament they played was a rugby sevens tournament in Nemila on 13 May 2012. RK Herceg had four games on schedule against RK Gladijatori Derventa, RK Rudar II, RK Čelik and RK Rudar. They lost in their first game ever against RK Gladijatori 0–22, second game they managed to draw 5–5, losing to RK Čelik 5–34 and losing in last minute to RK Rudar 12–19. In second tournament which was held in Sarajevo one week after, RK Herceg showed that the first tournament was a learning experience. First game they won against RK Vitez 19–0, lost second to RK Čelik 7–35 and losing a win to a draw in last minute to RK Gladijtori 12–12. RK Herceg finished 4th in their first rugby sevens season behind RK Rudar, RK Čelik and RK Gladijatori.

In June RK Herceg participated in humanitarian rugby sevens tournament "Viteško srce" hosted by RK Vitez in Vitez. They finished third, behind RK Čelik and RFC Arsenal Tivat. In group stage they beat Vitez 12–0 and lost to Tivat 0–26, finishing second. In play-off for third place they beat RK Tomislav 24–12.

On 1 July RK Herceg played their first, friendly, rugby 15s game against RK Vitez. More experienced RK Vitez won 10–29.

RK Herceg concluded their first season on 15 July with participation on traditional Beach rugby tournament, hosted by RK Tomislav on Buško jezero.

=== 2012–13 ===
In new season RK Herceg started with another friendly rugby 15s game, this time against RK Atletiko from Sveti Filip i Jakov. RK Herceg lost the game 19-34.

From this season RK Herceg joined the Bosnia and Herzegovina 15s championship. First game was played in Mostar on 3 March against combined teams of Tešanj RK and RK Warriors Nemila. RK Herceg won in their first official rugby 15s game 15–10. Second match was played od 10 March against RK Rudar, where RK Herceg lost 5–57. Next match, on 28 April, Herceg was scheduled to play against RK Čelik, team where majority of national team players come from. RK Herceg experienced their biggest ever lost in any competition they played. Result was 0-104. RK Herceg finished third, behind RK Čelik and RK Rudar.

Same as previous year, RK Herceg participated in Beach rugby tournament on Buško Jezero.

=== 2013–14 ===
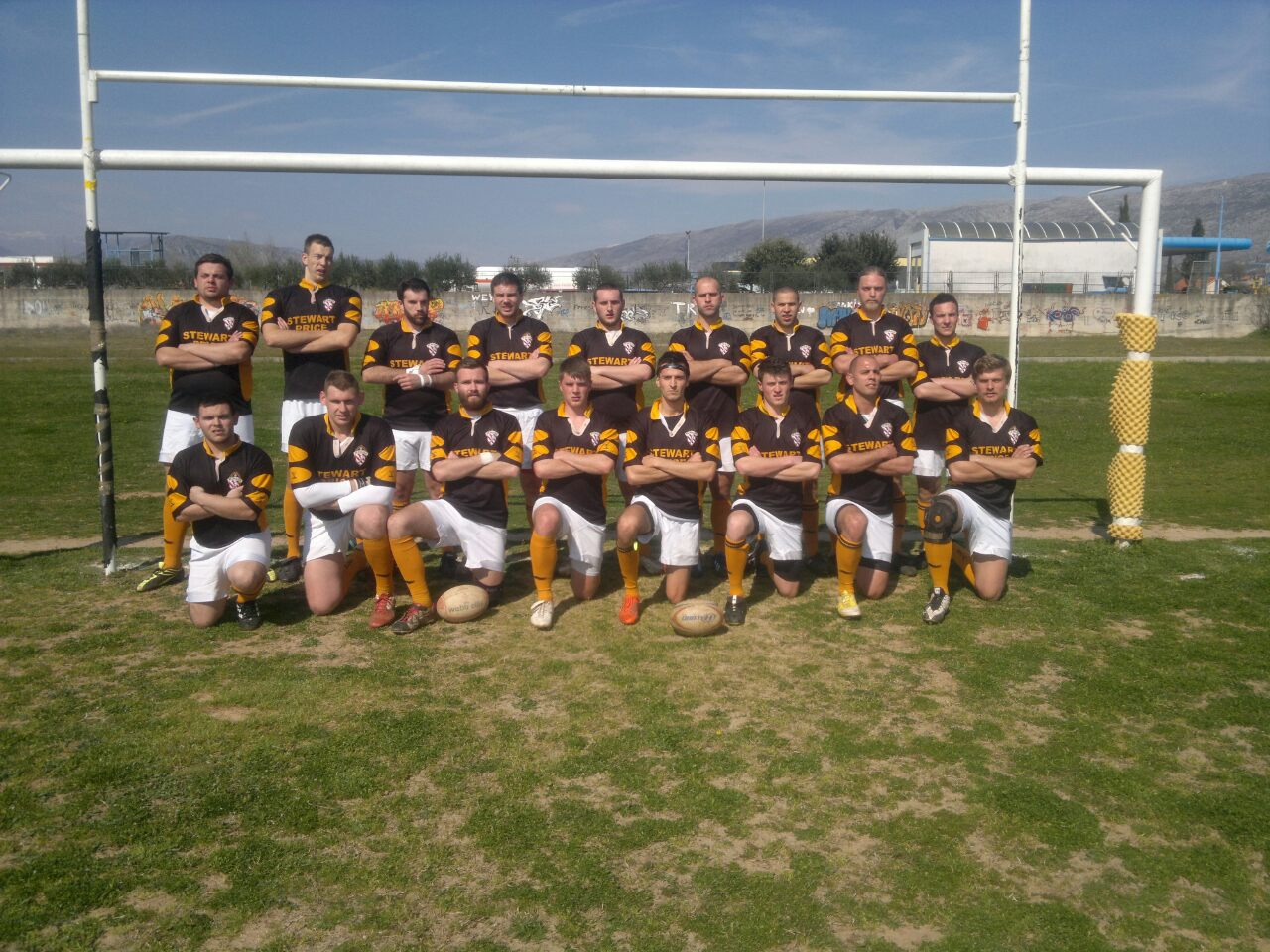
Rugby club Herceg in their new kit before game against TRK and RK Gladijatori in 2014

New season started with Bosnia and Herzegovina national 15s championship. RK Herceg played away match against combined teams of RK Gladijatori and Tešanjski RK, ending with lose 13:36.

On 16 November Herceg had their first rugby tens tournament in Nikšić, Montenegro. They won in their first two games against Ragbi klub Nikšić 12–5 and RFC Arsenal Tivat 12–5. In last match for the winner of the tournament RK Herceg lost 5–10, even though scoring first and leading most of the match.

15s championship continued on 16 March, where RK Herceg played home game against combined teams of RK Gladijatori and Tešanjski RK, but this time winning 14-12. Next game was on 30 March against RK Čelik. Herceg lost again with big difference, 0–87, but showed huge improvement. Last two games of season RK Herceg was supposed to play RK Vitez, but Vitez forfeited both games, registering them both 20–0 in favor of RK Herceg. RK Herceg, in their second 15s season, finished second, right behind champions RK Čelik.

This year national rugby sevens championship had only one tournament which was held in Tešanj. RK Herceg won against RK Gladijatori 12–5, RK Tomislav 27–0 and TRK 22–7. Only lost happened against RK Čelik 0–47, thus placing RK Herceg on second place.

Very successful season was ended with the Beach Rugby on Buško jezero.

== Name, colours and crest ==
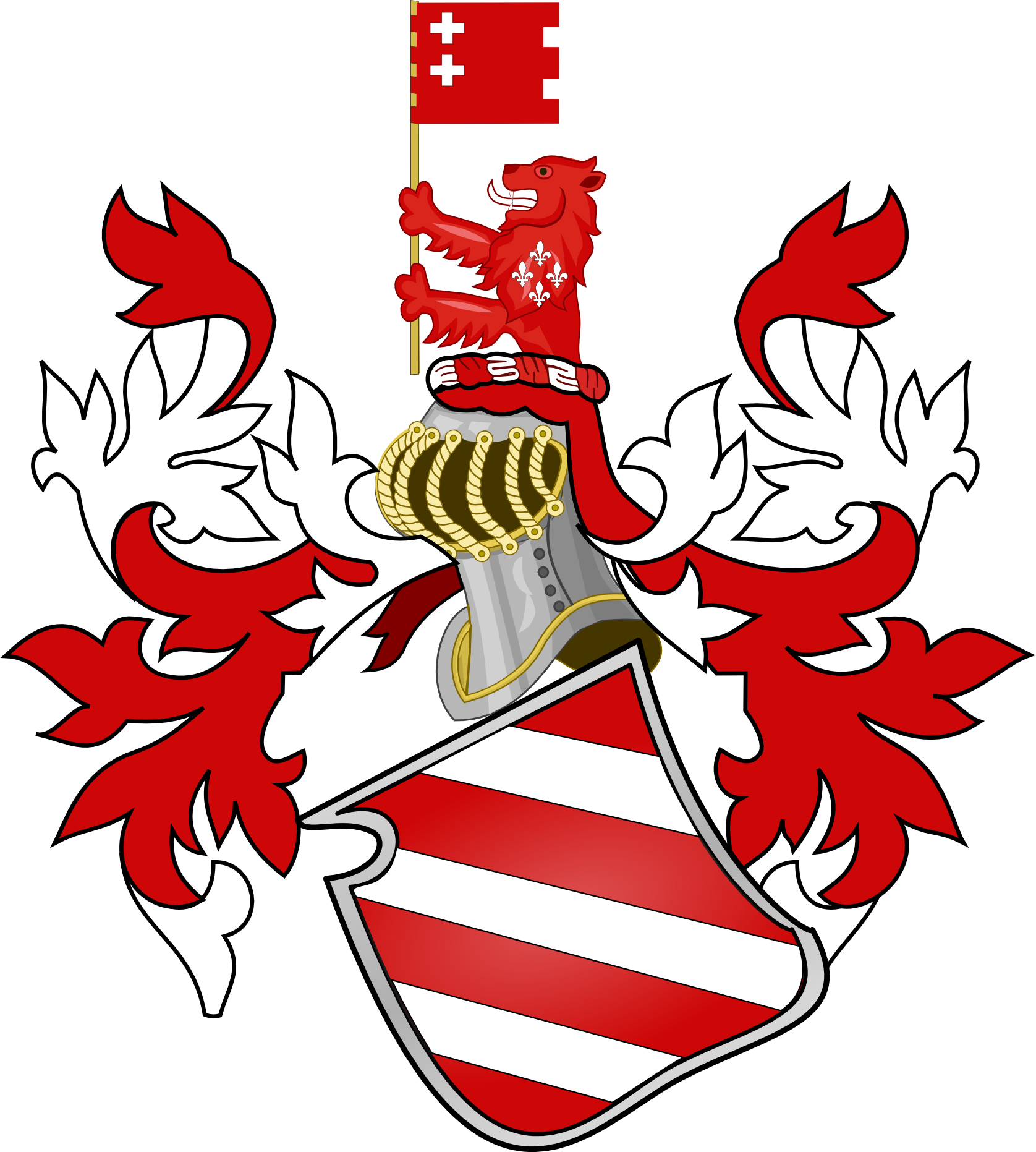
One representations of coat of arms of Kosača family

Name, colours and crest of the club are inspired by herzog Stjepan Vukčić Kosača. Because of the Stjepan Vukčić Kosača and his title of herzog, the whole region he ruled was named Herzegovina. Herzog translated to Serbo-Croatian is herceg, where from the name of the club comes. Crests shield, ribbon above the shield, red and white colours were taken from herzog's Kosača family crest. Lastly, the shape of rugby player running while rugby ball is in his hands was added.
