= Montenegro national rugby union team =

National rugby union team

Montenegro national rugby team
- Union: Montenegrin Rugby Union
- Nickname: "Wolves" (Vukovi)
- President: Zorica Kostić
- Coach: Alex Liddell
- Captain: Boris Mijušković
1st kit	2nd kit	3rd kit

First match
- Montenegro 29–27 Estonia (11 April 2015)

Largest win
- Montenegro 101-0 Kosovo (2 May 2026)

Largest defeat
- Slovakia 65-0 Montenegro (23 Apr 2022)

The Montenegro national rugby team, known as the Wolves (Vukovi), represents Montenegro in rugby union. The sport of rugby has only come recently to the country since its independence in 2006. The squad plays in red and gold jerseys with red shorts, and their emblem is the double headed eagle while their logo is the wolf. Montenegro are currently in Rugby Europe Conference Division. The team was first guided and coached by Marty Lusty.

== Current squad ==
Note: Flags indicate national union as has been defined under World Rugby eligibility rules. Players may hold more than one nationality. Rugby clubs are in brackets.

- 01 (Montenegro) Marštjepović Đorde (RK Mornar Bar)
- 02 (Montenegro) Miždalo Bojan (RFC Arsenal Tivat)
- 03 (Montenegro) Radović Milan (Vichy)
- 04 (Montenegro) Mirko Garčević (RK Podgorica)
- 05 (Montenegro) Aleksandar Milosavljević (RK Podgorica)
- 06 (Montenegro) Aleksandar Roganović (RK Nikšić)
- 07 (Montenegro) Ćavor Lazar (Northwood Boys High)
- 08 (Montenegro) Boris Mijušković (RK Nikšić) Captain
- 09 (Montenegro) Nikola Jovanović (RFC Arsenal Tivat)
- 10 (Montenegro) Popović Srđan (RFC Arsenal Tivat)
- 11 (Montenegro) Damjan Čelebic (RK Podgorica)
- 12 (Montenegro) Dušan Vučićević (Germany)
- 13 (Montenegro) Marko Kuč (RK Podgorica)
- 14 (Montenegro) Boško Mirjačić (RK Nikšić)
- 15 (Montenegro) Marko Andrić (RK Podgorica)
- 16 (Montenegro) Stanković Duško (RK Nikšić)
- 17 (Montenegro) Popović Željko (RK Cetinje)
- 18 (Montenegro) Jelić Ivan (RK Podgorica)
- 19 (Montenegro) Marko Kovačević (RK Cetinje)
- 20 (Montenegro) Vladan Čelebić (RK Podgorica)
- 21 (Montenegro) Ivan Colaković (RK Cetinje)
- 22 (Montenegro) Igor Adzaip (RFC Arsenal Tivat)
- 23 (Montenegro) Novica Raonić (RK Nikšić)

*squad and extended squad against Turkey 28 April 2018

== Record ==
Below is a table of the representative rugby matches played by a Montenegro national XV at test level up until 26 September 2026, updated after match with Kosovo.

Opponent	Played	Won	Lost	Drawn	% Won
Albania	1	1	0	0	100%
Bosnia and Herzegovina	3	1	2	0	33.33%
Belarus	1	1	0	0	100%
Bulgaria	2	1	1	0	50%
Estonia	2	1	1	0	50%
Gibraltar	1	0	1	0	0%
Kosovo	5	4	1	0	80%
Serbia	1	0	1	0	0%
Slovenia	1	0	1	0	0%
Slovakia	3	1	2	0	33.33%
Turkey	2	1	1	0	50%
Total	23	11	12	0	47.83%

== See also ==
- Rugby union in Montenegro
- Montenegrin Rugby Union
- 2014–16 European Nations Cup Third Division
- List of National Team Players
