= 2015–16 Montenegrin Cup (women) =

Kup Crne Gore za žene

Tournament details
- Country: Montenegro
- Teams: 7

Final positions
- Champions: Ekonomist (1st title)
- Runners-up: Mladost

Tournament statistics
- Matches played: 6
- Goals scored: 22 (3.67 per match)

The Montenegrin Cup 2015-16 was the first edition of the Montenegrin football tournament for women. Seven football clubs participated in the event. The winner of the competition was ŽFK Ekonomist Nikšić.

== Format ==
The competition started October 15, 2015, and finished with the final game on May 16, 2016. There were three rounds of competition: quarterfinals, semifinals and a final match.

== Results ==
=== Quarterfinals ===
Date	Home	Guest	Score
15/10/2015	Mladost Podgorica	Obilić Herceg Novi	2:0
15/10/2015	Pristan Bar	Breznica Pljevlja	0:4
15/10/2015	Lovćen Cetinje	Sjeverna Zvijezda	0:3

=== Semifinals ===
Date	Home	Guest	Score
14/11/2015	Mladost Podgorica	Breznica Pljevlja	1:1 - 4:2 (pen)
14/11/2015	Ekonomist Nikšić	Sjeverna Zvijezda	7:0

=== Final ===
May 16, 2016
17:00 CET

Ekonomist Nikšić	3–1	Mladost Podgorica
Lazarević 40'; Vučić 58'; Vučić 88'	Report	Knežević 50'

Camp FSCG, Podgorica
Attendance: 300

== See also ==
- Montenegrin Women's League
- Football Association of Montenegro
- Football in Montenegro
