= National Sevens Tournament =

The National Sevens Tournament is a rugby union tournament played between teams from Montenegro.

== History ==
=== 2013-2014 ===
Teams that participated: RK Mornar Bar, RFC Arsenal Tivat, RK Podgorica. This was the first 15-a-side tournament with was played locally with only Montenegrin clubs. Only three teams participated with them playing each other once and the best two play in a final.

Winner: RK Arsenal Tivat Runner Up: RK Buducnost

=== 2014-2015 ===
Teams that participated: RK Lovcen Cetnije, RK Niksic, RK Mornar Bar, RK Arsenal Tivat, RK Buducnost This was the height of participation with 5 strong teams would could all compete for the title. Each team played each other home and away twice. It was based as a league format and the top four would go into the semis play each other (1 vs 4 & 2 vs 3).

Winner: RK Niksic Runner Up: RK Lovcen

=== 2015-2016 ===
no tournament

=== 2016-2017 ===
no tournament

== Sevens Competitions in Montenegro ==
Winners in sevens competitions in Montenegro by year:

- 2013 RK Arsenal Tivat
- 2014 RK Arsenal Tivat
- 2015 RK Lovcen Cetnije
- 2016 RK Podgorica
- 2017 RK Podgorica
