= FK Crvena Stijena =

Montenegrin football club based in Tološi

- Full name: Fudbalski klub Crvena Stijena
- Founded: 1938; 88 years ago
- Ground: Tološi Stadium; Podgorica, Montenegro
- Capacity: 1,000
- Manager: Sajo Mrvaljević
- League: Montenegrin Third League
- 2024–25: Montenegrin Third League, 4th of 11
Home colours	Away colours

Fudbalski klub Crvena Stijena is a Montenegrin football club based in Tološi, a suburb of Podgorica. They currently compete in the Montenegrin Third League.

== History ==
The team was founded in 1938, as a sports' society of Podgorica's suburb Tološi. The team was named after the Crvena Stijena hill.
First significant success, FK Crvena Stijena made in the 1968–69 season, with their first-ever participation in the Montenegrin Republic League (Third rank). After two seasons, the team was relegated to the Fourth League - Central region, where they spent 12 consecutive seasons. In the 1981–82 season, FK Crvena Stijena won the champions title in the Fourth League, gaining a comeback to the Republic League.
Next decades, the team played mostly in the Montenegrin Republic League, with few relegations to the lower-rank competition. Best results in the Republic League, the team made in seasons 1999–00, 2002–03 and 2003–04, finishing third, but without promotion to the Second League.
During the nineties, FK Crvena Stijena made their first success in the Montenegrin Republic Cup. They played in Cup finals 1994–95 against FK Mornar, which gained them first-ever participation in the Yugoslav Cup (1995–96). But, notable results in the Montenegrin Republic Cup came at seasons 2004-05 and 2005–06, when FK Crvena Stijena became a title-holder. With that successes, the team played twice in the Serbia and Montenegro Cup - and made great surprises. On the first leg of the 2004–05 Serbia and Montenegro Cup, Crvena Stijena eliminated First League member FK Zemun (1:0), but defeated on penalties in Round of 16, against FK Radnički Pirot (1:1 - 1:3). Next season, FK Crvena Stijena made another big surprise, eliminating FK Vojvodina (2:0) in the first leg. In the Round of 16, they were defeated by FK Smederevo (0:4).
Following Montenegrin independence, FK Crvena Stijena became a member of the Montenegrin Second League inaugural season.
After four consecutive seasons in the Second League, FK Crvena Stijena was relegated to the Montenegrin Third League after the 2009–10 season. During the seasons 2010 and 2013, they won the Central Region Cup and participated in the Montenegrin Cup, but without significant successes.

== Honours and achievements ==
- Montenegrin Fourth League – 3
  - winners (1): 1981–82, 1987–88, 1996–97
- Montenegrin Republic Cup – 2
  - winners (2): 2004–05, 2005–06
  - runner-up (2): 1994–95, 2003–04
- Central Region Cup – 2
  - winners (2): 2010, 2013

== Famous players ==
During the decades, FK Crvena Stijena was among Podgorica clubs which produced many talents. Among them, most known was Branko Brnović, who played for FK Crvena Stijena until 1987 and Đorđije Ćetković. During his childhood, member of FK Crvena Stijena youth-program was NBA star Nikola Mirotić, too.

== Stadium ==
FK Crvena Stijena plays their home games at Tološi Stadium. Built in 1964, The stadium has a capacity of 1,000 seats, and except for football it's used for Rugby union, as a home of Rugby Club Podgorica and Rugby Club Budućnost.

== See also ==
- Tološi Stadium
- Montenegrin Third League
- Football in Montenegro
- Montenegrin clubs in Yugoslav football competitions (1946–2006)
- Podgorica
