= Lovćen (disambiguation) =

Lovćen is a mountain and national park in southwestern Montenegro.

Lovćen may also refer to:

- Lovćen (cigarette)
- FK Lovćen
- ŽFK Lovćen
- KK Lovćen
- RK Lovćen
- Rugby Club Lovćen
- Lovćen Brigade
- Lovcen (horse), a Japanese racehorse
