= Bijelo Polje =

Town and municipality in Northern Montenegro

Bijelo Polje Бијело Поље
- Town and municipality
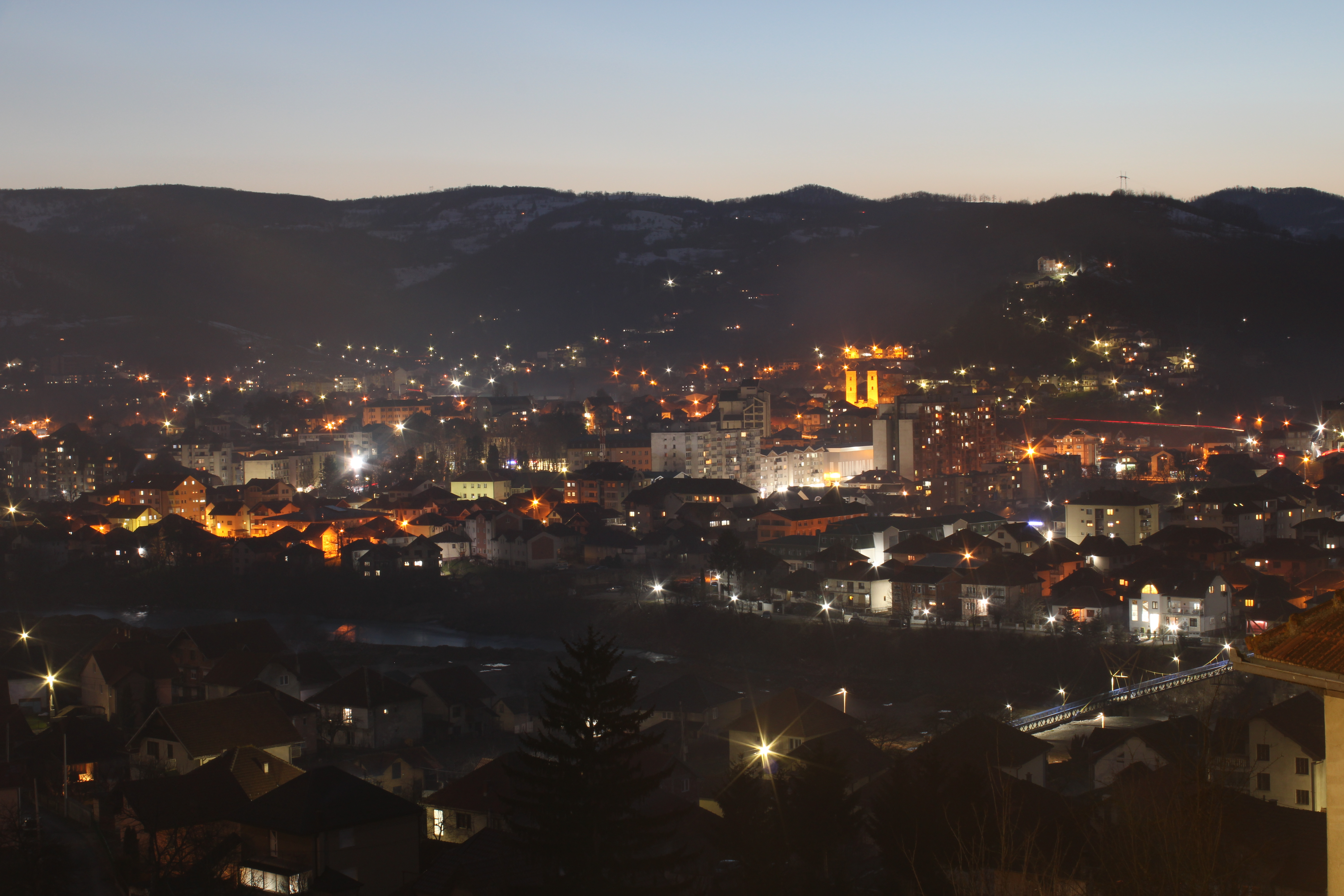
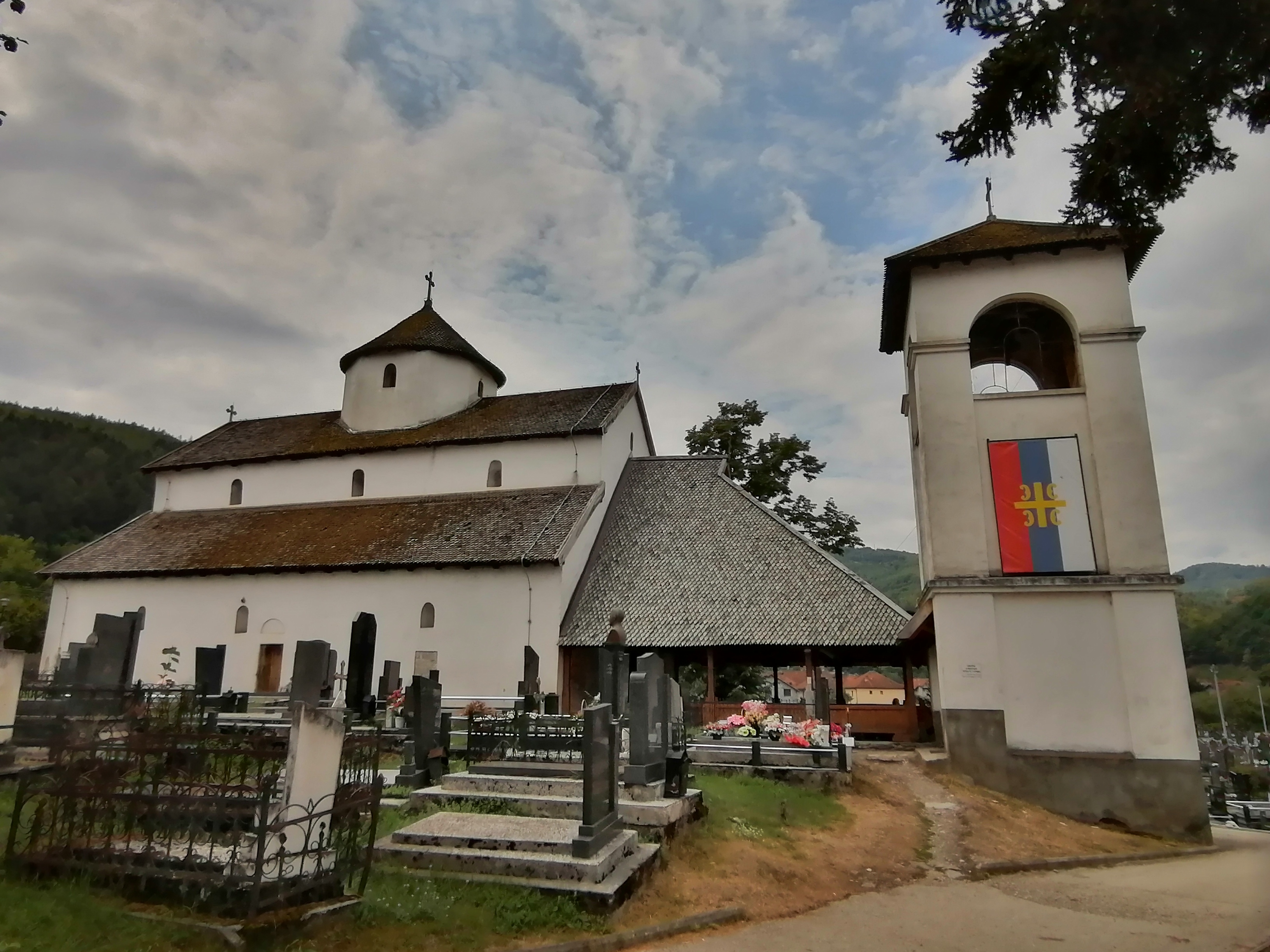
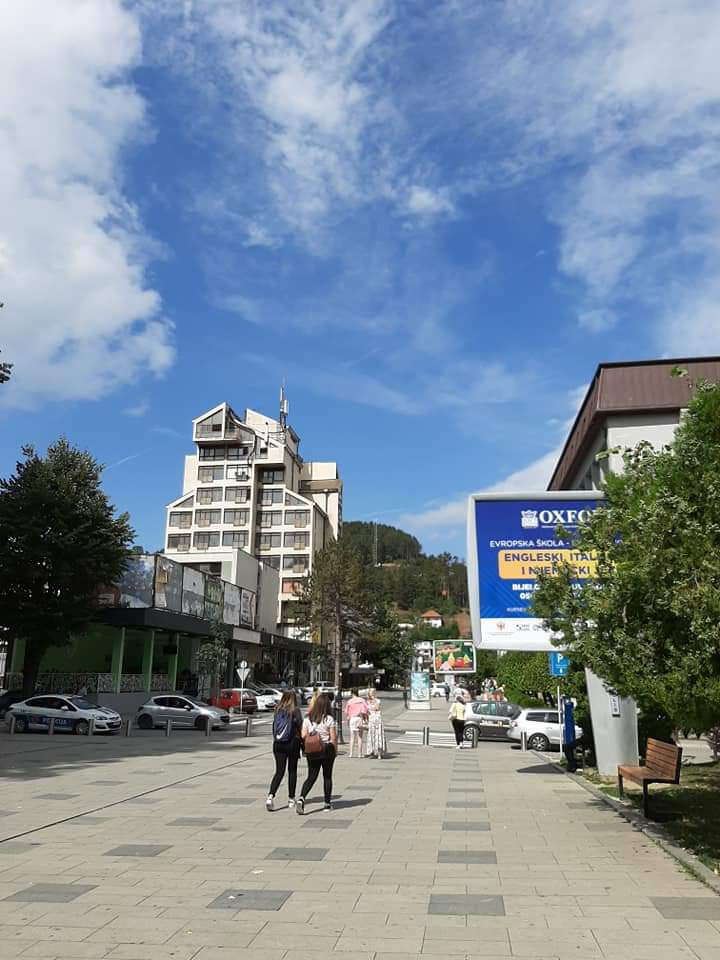
- From the top: Bijelo Polje at Night, Church of St. Nicholas, Town Centre

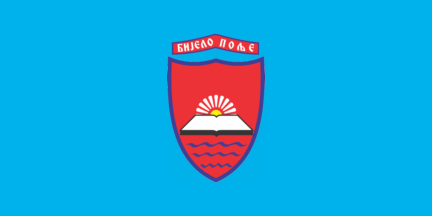
- Flag Coat of arms

- Location of Bijelo Polje in Montenegro
- Coordinates: 43.04°N 19.75°E
- Country: Montenegro
- Region: Northern
- Municipality: Bijelo Polje
- Settlements: 98

Government
  - Type: Mayor-Assembly
  - Mayor: Petar Smolović (DPS)

Area
  - Town and municipality: 924 km^{2} (357 sq mi)
- Elevation: 578 m (1,896 ft)

Population (2011 census)
  - Rank: 6th in Montenegro
  - Urban: 12,900
  - Rural: 30,651
  - Municipality: 46,051
- Demonym(s): Belopoljese; Bjelopoljci
- Time zone: UTC+1 (CET)
  - Summer (DST): UTC+2 (CEST)
- Postal code: 84000
- Area code: +382 50
- ISO 3166-2 code: ME-04
- Car plates: BP
- Climate: Cfb
- Website: www.bijelopolje.co.me

Bijelo Polje (Note: Ottoman Turkish: آق اووه; Turkish: Akova) (Cyrillic: Бијело Поље, pronounced [bîjeloː pôʎe], literally White Field) is a town located in the Northern Region of Montenegro, situated along Lim River. It has an urban population of 12,900 (2011 census). It is the administrative, economic, cultural and educational centre of northern Montenegro.

Bijelo Polje is the center of Bijelo Polje Municipality (population of 38,662). Bijelo Polje means 'white field' in Serbo-Croatian.

== History ==
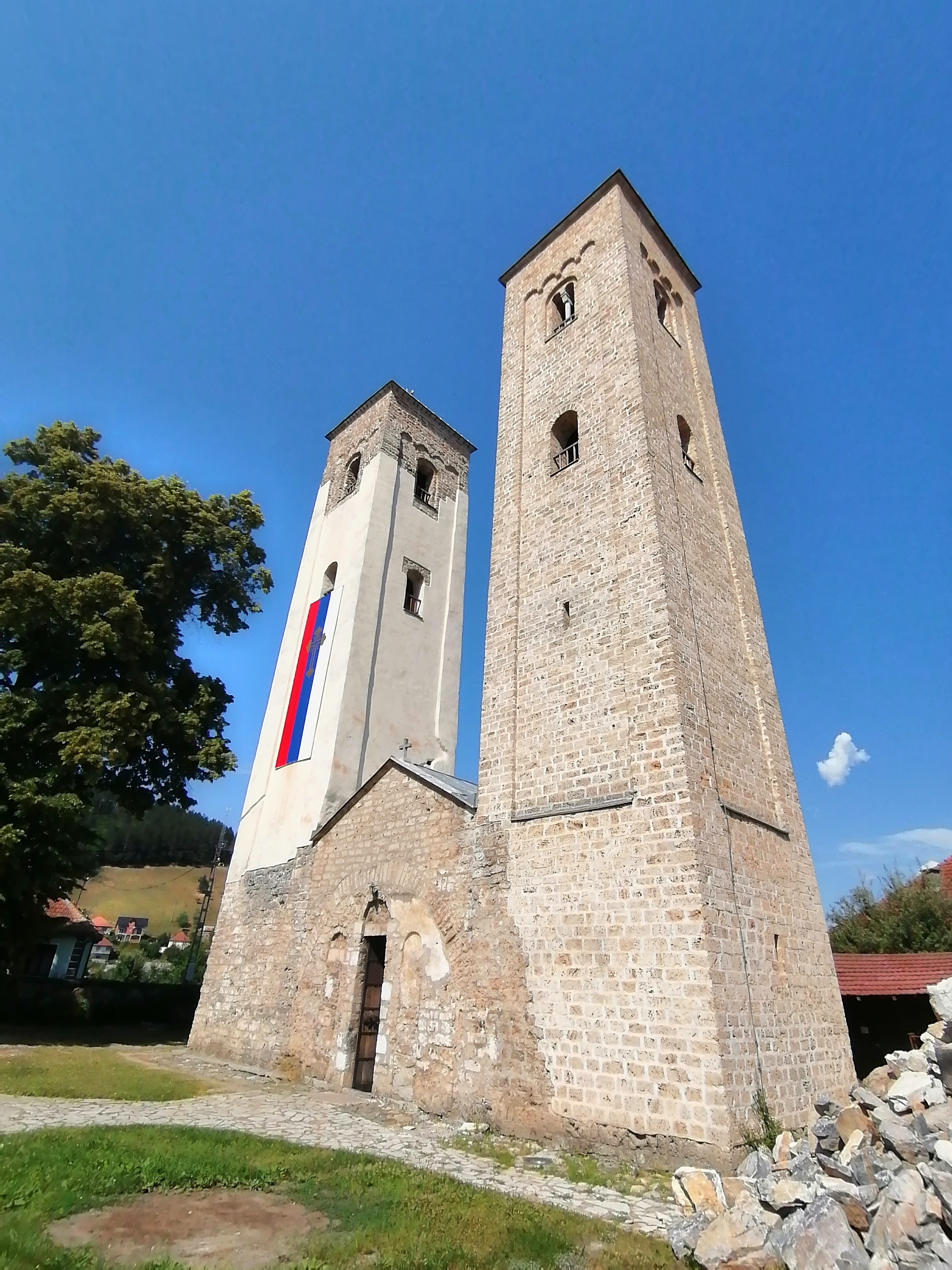
Photography of the Serbian Orthodox Church of the Holy Apostles Peter and Paul in Bijelo Polje

Bijelo Polje's Saint Peter and Paul Church is the place where the UNESCO Miroslav's Gospel of Miroslav, brother of Serbian ruler Stefan Nemanja was written.

During World War II, Bijelo Polje was a prominent location for the anti-fascist resistance movement in Yugoslavia, Montenegro in particular.

== Demographics ==
Bijelo Polje is the administrative centre of the Bijelo Polje municipality, which in 2011 had a population of 46,251. The town of Bijelo Polje itself has 12,242 citizens.

Historical populations of the town
Year	Pop.	±%
1948	3,547	—
1953	4,029	+13.6%
1961	5,856	+45.3%
1971	8,925	+52.4%
1981	11,927	+33.6%
1991	16,464	+38.0%
2003	15,883	−3.5%
2011	12,242	−22.9%

Historical populations of the municipality
Year	Pop.	±%
1948	36,795	—
1953	41,432	+12.6%
1961	46,651	+12.6%
1971	52,598	+12.7%
1981	55,634	+5.8%
1991	55,268	−0.7%
2003	50,284	−9.0%
2011	46,051	−8.4%
2023	38,662	−16.0%

=== Ethnicity ===
The ethnic composition of the town of Bijelo Polje in the 2023 census was as follows: 40.16% Bosniaks, 25.25% Serbs, 20.89% Montenegrins, 8.41% ethnic Muslims. A total of 1.82% of the population are part of other ethnic groups and 3.47% are undeclared.

=== Religion ===
Religion in Bijelo Polje (2023)
1. Islam (49.1%)
2. Eastern Orthodoxy (45.2%)
3. Irreligion (1.00%)
4. Other religion (1.15%)
5. Undeclared (3.61%)

Bijelo Polje is religiously diverse, with the majority of the population adhering to Islam and Eastern Orthodoxy. Islamic community primarily consists of Bosniaks and ethnic Muslims, while the Orthodox Christianity is predominantly practiced by Serbs and Montenegrins. Religious institutions, such as mosques and churches, are an integral part of the town's cultural and social fabric, reflecting its multi-ethnic and multi-religious character. Despite historical challenges, Bijelo Polje is known for its peaceful coexistence and tolerance between different religious communities.

== Culture and sights ==
Bijelo Polje was the birthplace of many prominent writers such as Ćamil Sijarić, Miodrag Bulatović, Risto Ratković and Dragomir Brajković as well as basketball player Nikola Peković.

== Sports ==
The major football team is Jedinstvo, who have spent several seasons in the country's top tier. They share their Gradski stadion with lower league team OFK Borac. The town's basketball teams are Jedinstvo and KK Centar.

== Healthcare ==
Bijelo Polje has a general hospital (Serbian: Opšta bolnica), located on the southwestern outskirts of the town in the Medanovići area. A primary healthcare centre (Serbian: Dom zdravlja) is also located in the town centre.

The development of specialized healthcare services in Bijelo Polje was associated with the work of physician and neuropsychiatrist Dr. Milija Pavićević (1943–2011). During his medical career, he established and headed the neuropsychiatric department and served as director of the General Hospital in Bijelo Polje.

== Transport ==
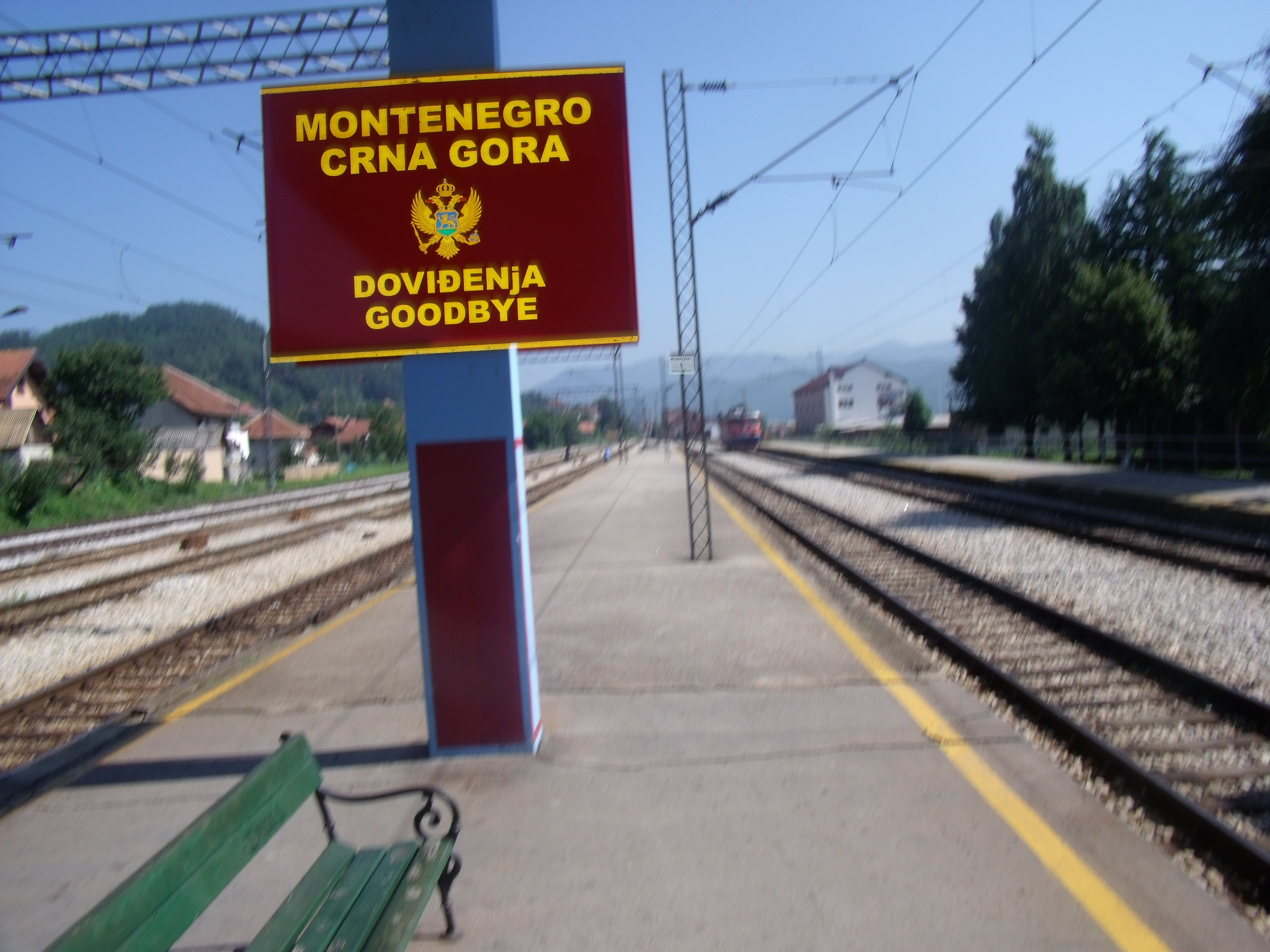
Bijelo Polje is the end of the Montenegrin part of the Belgrade–Bar railway

Bijelo Polje is connected to the rest of Montenegro by two major roads. It is situated on the main road connecting Montenegro's coast and Podgorica with northern Montenegro and Serbia (E65, E80).

Bijelo Polje is also a station on Belgrade–Bar railway, the last station in Montenegro for trains leaving for Belgrade, and it serves as a regional train station. Podgorica Airport is 130 km (81 mi) away, and has regular flights to major European destinations.

== Climate ==
Bijelo Polje has a humid continental climate (Köppen: Dfb) with warm summers, cold winters, and abundant precipitation year round.

Climate data for Bijelo Polje (1961–1990 normals, extremes 1950–present)
Month	Jan	Feb	Mar	Apr	May	Jun	Jul	Aug	Sep	Oct	Nov	Dec	Year
Record high °C (°F)	18.0 (64.4)	27.0 (80.6)	26.5 (79.7)	30.8 (87.4)	33.5 (92.3)	35.5 (95.9)	39.0 (102.2)	39.8 (103.6)	36.5 (97.7)	32.0 (89.6)	25.5 (77.9)	20.1 (68.2)	39.8 (103.6)
Mean daily maximum °C (°F)	3.5 (38.3)	6.9 (44.4)	11.6 (52.9)	16.4 (61.5)	21.1 (70.0)	24.7 (76.5)	27.1 (80.8)	27.6 (81.7)	23.0 (73.4)	17.4 (63.3)	10.3 (50.5)	4.3 (39.7)	16.2 (61.1)
Daily mean °C (°F)	−1.1 (30.0)	1.2 (34.2)	5.1 (41.2)	9.7 (49.5)	13.9 (57.0)	17.2 (63.0)	18.9 (66.0)	18.7 (65.7)	14.8 (58.6)	9.9 (49.8)	4.9 (40.8)	0.3 (32.5)	9.5 (49.0)
Mean daily minimum °C (°F)	−4.8 (23.4)	−3.4 (25.9)	−0.3 (31.5)	3.4 (38.1)	7.5 (45.5)	10.8 (51.4)	12.2 (54.0)	11.9 (53.4)	9.0 (48.2)	5.0 (41.0)	1.0 (33.8)	−3.0 (26.6)	4.1 (39.4)
Record low °C (°F)	−27.6 (−17.7)	−24.5 (−12.1)	−18.2 (−0.8)	−8.6 (16.5)	−4.0 (24.8)	−0.8 (30.6)	1.2 (34.2)	2.6 (36.7)	−4.0 (24.8)	−7.2 (19.0)	−15.4 (4.3)	−21.7 (−7.1)	−27.6 (−17.7)
Average precipitation mm (inches)	71.7 (2.82)	72.2 (2.84)	63.0 (2.48)	71.6 (2.82)	78.0 (3.07)	72.0 (2.83)	65.6 (2.58)	55.8 (2.20)	74.4 (2.93)	81.6 (3.21)	103.2 (4.06)	88.9 (3.50)	898.2 (35.36)
Average precipitation days (≥ 1 mm)	8.2	8.7	7.9	9.2	10.3	8.5	7.5	6.4	8.1	8.2	8.9	9.1	101.0
Average relative humidity (%)	82	76	71	69	72	75	74	74	78	79	82	85	76
Source 1: National Oceanic and Atmospheric Administration (precipitation days)
Source 2: Hydrological and Meteorological Service of Montenegro (regulars 1961–1990)

== Notable people ==
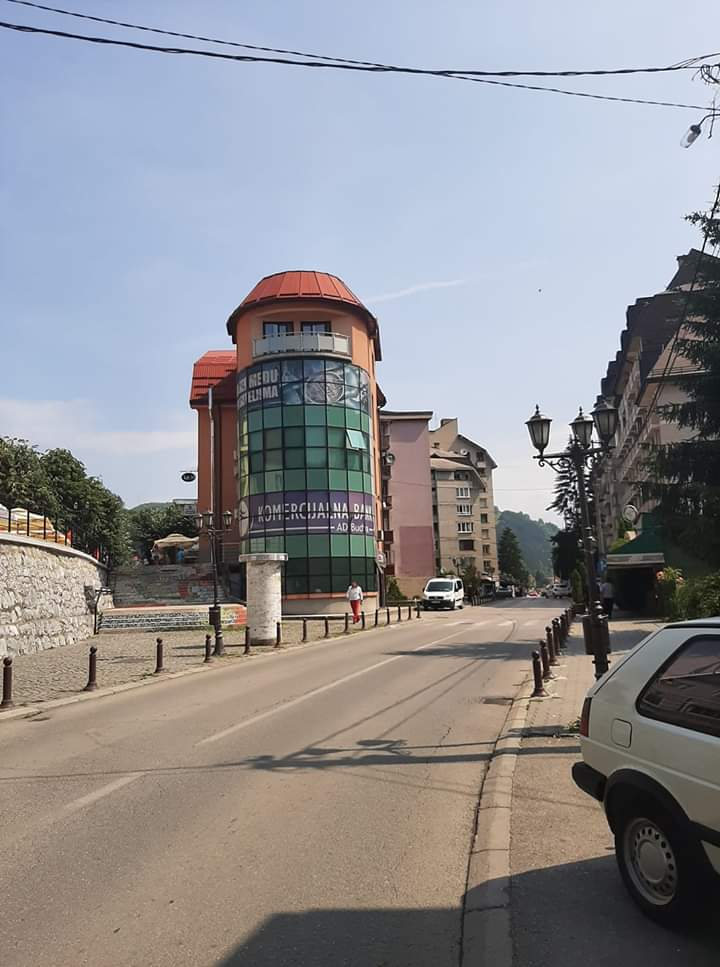
A street in Bijelo Polje.

- Milija Pavićević, physician, neuropsychiatrist, Doctor of Medical Sciences, primarius, and professor
- Miodrag Bulatović, writer
- Ćamil Sijarić, writer
- Dragomir Brajković, writer
- Risto Ratković, writer
- Nastasja Vojinović, musician
- Milutin Karadžić, actor
- Duško Ivanović, basketball coach
- Nikola Peković, basketball player
- Predrag Drobnjak, basketball player
- Suad Šehović, basketball player
- Sead Šehović, basketball player

== Twin towns – sister cities ==
Bijelo Polje is twinned with:

- Bila Tserkva, Ukraine
- Burhaniye, Turkey
- Hrubieszów, Poland
- Maardu, Estonia
- Strumica, North Macedonia
- Svishtov, Bulgaria
