= Ćamil Sijarić =

Bosnian and Montenegrin writer

Ćamil Sijarić Ћамил Сијарић
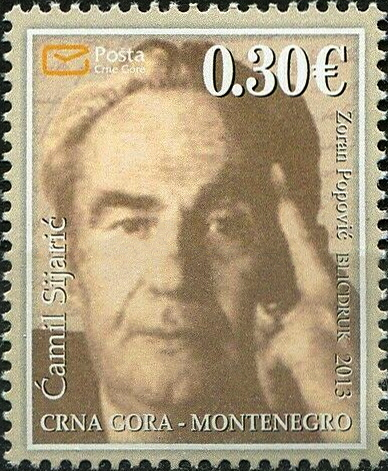
- Ćamil Sijarić on a 2013 stamp of Montenegro
- Born: 18 December 1913; Bijelo Polje, Kingdom of Montenegro
- Died: 6 December 1989 (aged 75); Sarajevo, SR Bosnia and Herzegovina, SFR Yugoslavia
- Occupation: Novelist

Ćamil Sijarić (Serbo-Croatian Cyrillic: Ћамил Сијарић; 18 December 1913 – 6 December 1989) was a Bosniak novelist and short story writer. He enrolled in law school in 1936 and earned his degree four years later. Sijarić died in a car crash at the age of 75. His literary work introduced region of Sandžak and its rural Bosniak population into Bosnian literature.

== Life ==
He was born in Šipovice, near Bijelo Polje, in the Kingdom of Montenegro, to Muslim parents. He was of Albanian origin on his mother's side, and he considered Albanian to be native to him. Both of his parents died while he was a child. He was raised thereafter by his aunts and uncles.

Sijarić enrolled in the University of Belgrade's Law School and earned his degree in 1940. He was both a member of Montenegrin Academy of Sciences and Arts, and Academy of Arts and Sciencies of Bosnia and Herzegovina. In addition to Serbo-Croatian, he spoke Albanian, Arabic, French and Russian.

During the Second World War, Sijarić worked as a clerk in the courts in Mostar, Bosanska Gradiška, Banja Luka and Sarajevo, cooperating all the time with the Unitary National Liberation Front of Yugoslavia. At the same time, he wrote and published poems in the Belgrade and Sarajevo magazines Žena danas and Gajret, and after World War II also in Zora, Nova žena, Brazda, Oslobođenje.

His first literary work was Ram-Bulja (1953), which he first wrote in Albanian but then later translated and first it in published Bosnian. It was thereafter re-translated into Albanian shortly after because, according to Sijarić, the characters there themselves can be seen as Albanians. His most acclaimed work is the novel Bihorci (1955).

He spent most of his life in Skopje, Belgrade and later, Sarajevo. However, almost all his major works are about Sandžak and the Bihor region around Bijelo Polje. His works have been translated in more than a dozen languages, including Russian, German and French.

Sijarić perished in a car crash in Sarajevo, shortly before his 76th birthday in December 1989.

Not long before his death, Sijarić wrote a poem called Znam (I Know), which appears to show him foreshadowing his own death:

Znam

Znam da se u ovu kasnu jesen
U prekasnu jesen
na Šipovicama šipci crvene.
Da hoće vjetar bar malo – bar malo,
njihove boje nanijeti na mene,
na ruke,
na lice –
jer vidim da se ove jeseni
posljednji put za mene
crvene
šipci iz Šipovica

I Know

I know that in this late autumn
in this very late autumn
in Šipovica, the rose hips redden
If only the wind would – even a little
Spread their colors over me
on my hands,
on my face –
For I see that this autumn
the rose hips in Šipovica
will redden for me
for the last time

Three schools bear the name of Ćamil Sijarić, in Sarajevo, Novi Pazar, and Nemila. Several cities—including Brčko, Novi Pazar, Podgorica, Tutin, and Nova Varoš—have streets named for Sijarić. In Novi Pazar, the Pero Ćamilo Sijarić literary prize is awarded, and in Bijelo Polje there is a Day of Remembrance for Ćamilo Sijarić. A fountain was built in his memory in his native village of Šipovice.

== Works ==
Some of his most important works are:

- Ram-Bulja (stories, 1953)
- Bihorci (novel, 1956)
- Zelen prsten na vodi (stories, 1957)
- Naša snaha i mi momci (stories, 1962)
- Kuću kućom čine lastavice (1962)
- Mojkovačka bitka (novel, 1968)
- Sablja (stories, 1969)
- Na putu putnici (stories, 1969)
- Zapisi o gradovima (travelogues, 1970)
- Konak (novel, 1971)
- Kad djevojka spava, to je kao da mirišu jabuke (stories, 1973)
- Carska vojska (novel, 1976)
- Raška zemlja Rascija (novel, 1979)
- Francuski pamuk (stories, 1980)
- Oslobođeni Jasenovac (memoirs, 1983)
- Rimski prsten (stories, 1985)
- Herceg-Bosno i tvoji gradovi (travelogues, 1986)
- Lirika (poems, 1988)
- Koliba na nebu (poems, 1990)
- Drvo kraj Akova (stories, 1990)

== Awards ==
- Honorary citizen of Leningrad
- Award of the Association of Writers of Bosnia and Herzegovina (1953)
- First prize at the anonymous competition of the publishing company Narodna prosvjeta (1955)
- Svjetlost Award for the best published story in that company 1945-1955 (1955)
- Thirteenth of July Award (1971)
- Award of the Society of Writers of Bosnia and Herzegovina (1962)
- Andrić Prize (1980)
- Yugoslav award for the novel (1983)
