= RK Warriors Nemila =

Ragbi klub Warriors Nemila
- Nickname(s): Warriors
- Location: Nemila, Bosnia and Herzegovina

RK Warriors Nemila is a Bosnian rugby club based in Nemila. In the 2012–2013 season, they combined with Tešanj RK.
