= Tološi Stadium =

Football stadium in Podgorica, Montenegro

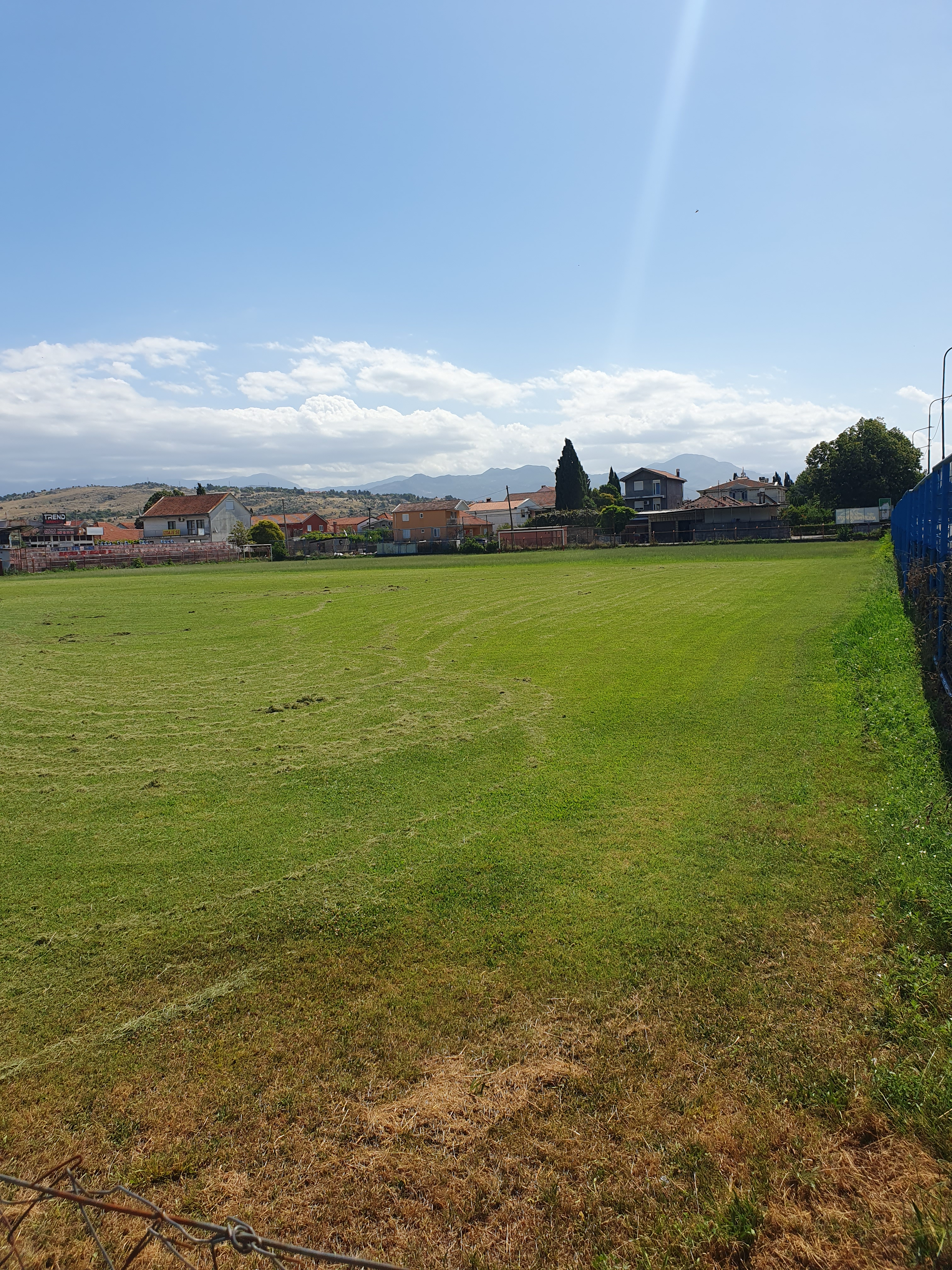
- Interactive map of Tološi Stadium
- Full name: Stadion FK Crvena Stijena
- Location: Podgorica, Montenegro
- Coordinates: 42.451057°N 19.225269°E
- Owner: City of Podgorica
- Capacity: 1,000
- Surface: grass
- Field size: 105x65

Construction
- Built: 1964
- Renovated: 2003

Tenants
- FK Crvena Stijena, RK Podgorica, RK Budućnost

Tološi Stadium is a football stadium in Podgorica, Montenegro. Situated in the Tološi neighbourhood, it is used for football and Rugby union matches. It is the home ground of FK Crvena Stijena, and it's used by rugby teams Podgorica and Budućnost.

== History ==
Tološi Stadium was built during 1964, as a home ground of FK Crvena Stijena. Except them, stadium was used as a home ground of FK Partizan Momišići since the dissolution of the club (1996).
The Stadium was renovated in 2003, when the new stands were built. Today, the capacity of the stadium is 1,000 seats. From 2012, Tološi Stadium is used as a home ground of Podgorica Rugby union teams.

== Pitch and conditions ==
The pitch measures 105 x 65 meters. The stadium didn't met UEFA criteria for European competitions.
In addition to the main field is an auxiliary field, with one basketball court.

== See also ==
- FK Crvena Stijena
- RK Podgorica
- RK Budućnost
- Podgorica
