= ŽFK Lovćen =

ŽFK Lovćen Cetinje
- Full name: Ženski fudbalski klub Lovćen
- Founded: 2010
- Ground: Sveti Petar Cetinjski; Cetinje, Montenegro
- Capacity: 2,000
- Manager: Ivan Tatar
- League: Montenegrin Women's League
- 2015–16: 5th
Home colours	Away colours

ŽFK Lovćen is a women's football club from Cetinje, Montenegro. Founded at 2010, ŽFK Lovćen plays in the Montenegrin Women's League.

== History ==
While FK Lovćen is the oldest men's club in Montenegro, ŽFK Lovćen is founded at May 2010. Since then, club played and organized numerous tournaments, and on the season 2015-16 for the first time played in Montenegrin Women's League and Montenegrin Cup (women).
On their debut in the First League, ŽFK Lovćen won fifth place among eight clubs. During the season, Lovćen made biggest win in the clubs' history, on 23 September 2015, against ŽFK Cvetex in Berane (5:0).

=== Record by seasons ===
Below is a list of ŽFK Lovćen seasons in Montenegrin women's football competitions.

Season	Competition	Pos	G	W	D	L	GD	Pts
2015-16	Montenegrin First League	5	12	4	1	7	20:49	13

== See also ==
- Montenegrin Women's League
- Montenegrin Cup (women)
- Football in Montenegro
- FK Lovćen
- SD Lovćen Cetinje
- Cetinje
