= SD Lovćen Cetinje =

Sports society in Montenegro

SD Lovćen
- Full name: Sportsko društvo Lovćen
- Nicknames: Crveni (The Reds)
- Sports: 13 active clubs
- Founded: 1913 in Cetinje, Montenegro
- Based in: Cetinje
- Colors: Red and White

Sportsko društvo Lovćen (lit. 'Sports Society Lovćen') is a multi-sport club from Cetinje, Montenegro. By tradition, number of titles and historical results, it's one of the most successful sports societies in Montenegro. Currently, there is 13 clubs in 10 different sports inside SD Lovćen organization.

== Clubs ==
Currently, multiple clubs in Montenegro of different sports share the name Lovćen. Their management is separate and each operate independently from each other. Totally, there is 13 different clubs in 10 sports under the SD Lovćen organisation.

Sport	Club name	Est
Football	Fudbalski klub Lovćen (Men); Ženski fudbalski klub Lovćen (Women)	1913; 2010
Handball	Rukometni klub Lovćen (Men)	1949
Basketball	Košarkaški klub Lovćen (Men); Ženski košarkaški klub Lovćen (Women)	1947; 1947
Volleyball	Odbojkaški klub Lovćen (Men); Ženski odbojkaški klub Lovćen (Women)	1980; 1980
Athletics	Atletski klub Lovćen	1945
Table tennis	Stonoteniski klub Lovćen	1952
Rugby	Rugby Club Lovćen	2013
Car racing	Auto moto klub Lovćen	1970
Kickboxing	Kik-boks klub Lovćen	2011
Powerlifting	Powerlifting klub Lovćen	2008

== Honours and titles / team sports ==
Teams and sportists of SD Lovćen Cetinje won numerous titles of champions of Montenegro, Yugoslavia and on European individual tournaments. During the history, teams of SD Lovćen in team sports (football, handball, basketball, volleyball, rugby) won 19 national trophies.

=== Lovćen Football Club ===
- National Championship:
  - Runner-up: 1 (2013–14)
- National Cup:
  - Winner: 1 (2013–14)
  - Runner-up: 1 (2008–09)
- National Order of the Montenegrin flag:
  - 2013

=== Lovćen Handball Club ===
- National Championship:
  - Winner: 10 (1999-00, 2000-01, 2006-07, 2011-12, 2012-13, 2013-14, 2014-15, 2017/18, 2018/19, 2019/20)
  - Runner-up: 9 (1996-97, 1998-99, 2001-02, 2002-03, 2007-08, 2008-09, 2010-11, 2015-16, 2016-17)
- National Cup:
  - Winner: 12 (2001-02, 2002-03, 2008-09, 2009-10, 2010-11, 2011-12, 2012-13, 2013-14, 2014-15, 2016-17, 2017/18, 2019/20)
  - Runner-up: 2 (2006–07, 2015-16)
- EHF Champions League:
  - 5th place: (2000-01)

=== Lovćen Basketball Club ===
- National Championship:
  - Runner-up: 2 (2006-07, 2008-09)
- National Cup:
  - Runner-up: 2 (2006-07, 2010-11)
- Balkan League:
  - Runner-up: 1 (2009-10)

=== Lovćen Women Basketball Club ===
- National Championship:
  - Runner-up: 3 (2014-15, 2015-16, 2016-17)
- National Cup:
  - Runner-up: 3 (2014-15, 2015-16, 2016-17)

=== Lovćen Rugby Club ===
- National Sevens Championship:
  - Winner: 1 (2014-15)
- National Championship:
  - Runner-up: 2 (2014-15)

== See also ==
- FK Lovćen
- RK Lovćen
- KK Lovćen
- ŽFK Lovćen
- ŽOK Lovćen Cetinje
- Rugby Club Lovćen
- Stadion Sveti Petar Cetinjski
- Cetinje
