= Rugby Club Lovćen =

Montenegrin rugby union club, based in Lovćen

Lovcen Rugby Club
- Union: Montenegrin Rugby Union
- Nickname: "Gromovi" (Thunder)
- Founded: 2015; 11 years ago
- President: Goran Djukanovic
Team kit

Rugby Club Lovcen was formed in 2015 at Cetinje, Montenegro.

== See also ==
- Rugby union in Montenegro
- Montenegrin Rugby Union
- 2014–16 European Nations Cup Third Division
- SD Lovćen Cetinje
- Cetinje

== External links & Reference ==
- Rugby Club Lovćen official site
