= Montenegrin Rugby Union =

Crnogorski ragbi savez
- Logo of Rugby Montenegro
- Sport: Rugby union
- Founded: September 2013
- President: (Montenegro) Nikola Vuletic

The Montenegrin Rugby Union (Montenegrin: Crnogorski ragbi savez, Црногорски рагби савез) is the governing body for rugby union in Montenegro.

== History ==
Montenegrin Rugby Union was founded in September 2013, and became affiliated to Rugby Europe in 2014.

== National Teams ==
The Montenegro rugby union are in charge of:

- Montenegro national rugby union team - the national men's team.
- Montenegro national rugby sevens team - the national men's seven-a-side team.
- Montenegro national women's rugby sevens team - the national women's seven-a-side team.

== Coaching staff ==
The current coaching staff appointed by the union are:

== See also ==
- Rugby union in Montenegro
- List of montenegrin national rugby union players
