= Nastasja Vojinović =

Montenegrin classical violinist, soloist, and chamber musician

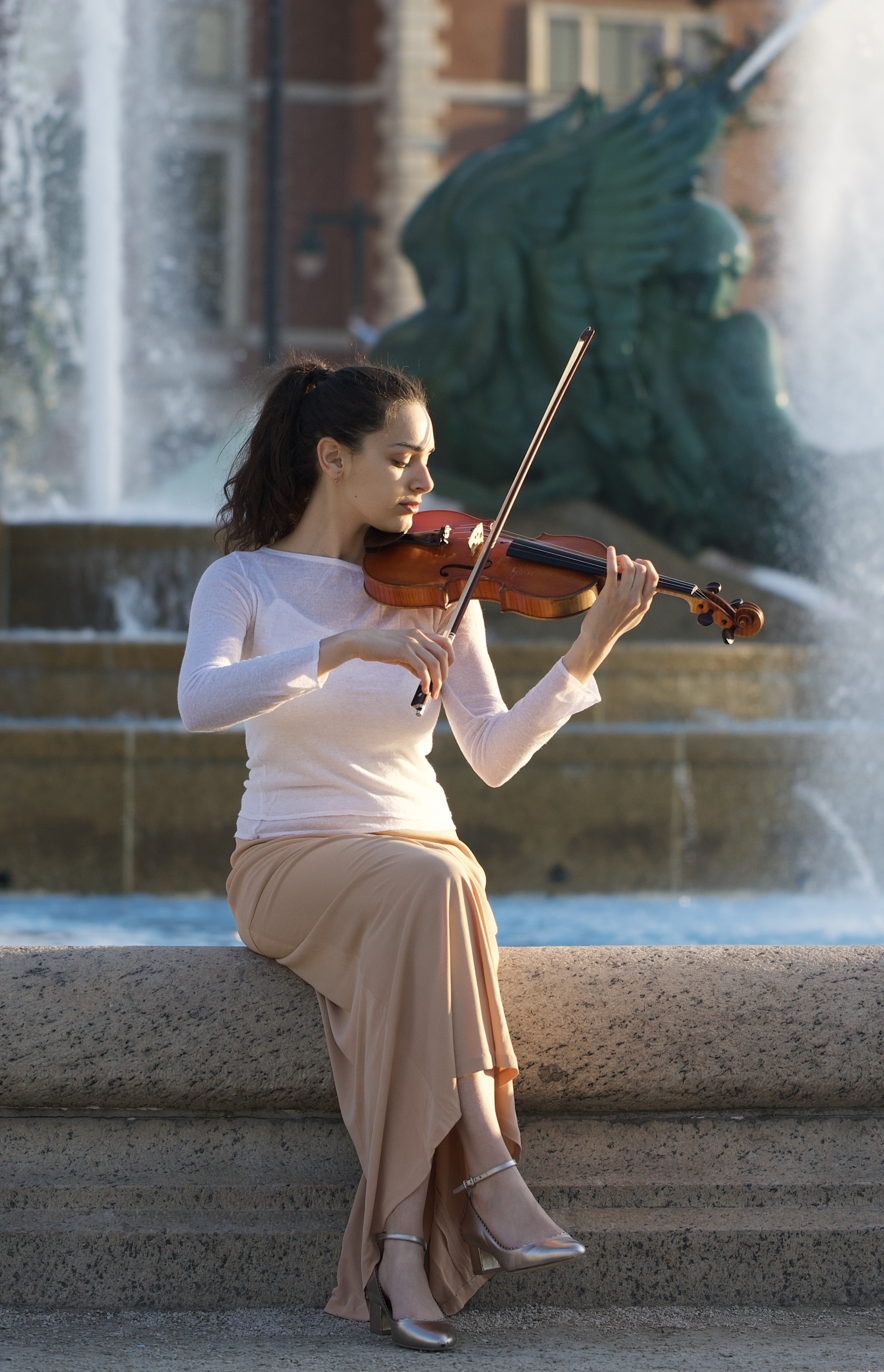
- Nastasja Vojinović at the Logan Square of Philadelphia in 2018 with her Carl Becker Violin made in 1926.
- Born: Nastasja Vojinović; March 9, 1995 (age 31); Berane, Montenegro, FR Yugoslavia
- Education: Faculty of Music Belgrade, Boyer College of Music and Dance, Mannes School of Music.
- Known for: Philadelphia String Quartet
- Style: Classical Musician
- Website: vojinovna.com

Nastasja Vojinović is a Montenegrin classical violinist, soloist, and chamber musician. She is known for her work with the Philadelphia String Quartet and performances with numerous tango ensembles and chamber groups. She has studied with Gordana Matijević-Nedeljković, Eduard Schmieder, and Wen Qian. She appeared at the KotorArt Festival in her solo recital in 2019. In 2020, she performed with musicians from Santa Barbara for the Santa Barbara-Kotor Sister Cities program, between Kotor and Santa Barbara. Recently, one of the projects she has been a part of, Broadcast from Home, has been featured by the BBC Radio, Washington Post, and Guggenheim Museum in New York. Nastasja is currently performing with the Philadelphia String Quartet as their Lead Violinist, who she has been with since 2017.

== Early life and education ==
Nastasja Vojinović was born in 1995 in Berane, Montenegro. She grew up in Bijelo Polje, Montenegro. At the age of 7, she started playing the violin at the music school in Berane. In 2007, she moved to Belgrade, Serbia and continued her music education at the Kosta Manojlović Music School in Zemun. In 2016, she moved to the United States to study with Eduard Schmieder. Nastasja, under the guidance of Wen Qian, and earned a Professional Studies Diploma from the Mannes School of Music, The New School University.

== Career ==
In 2007, at the age of 11, Nastasja had her solo recital debut at The Cultural Center Hall of her hometown, Bijelo Polje. In 2011, she debuted as soloist with the Youth Philharmonic "Borislav Pašćan". She went on to perform for the whole season with the orchestra.

Nastasja's first professional experience came when she started performing with the Belgrade Strings "Dušan Skovran" in 2012. She performed five seasons with the ensemble, until 2016. She also performed as soloist with the Belgrade Strings at the Kolarac Hall in Belgrade in 2013.

When she arrived in the United States, she quickly picked up a teaching position in Philadelphia. Through the platform of Temple Music Prep and Community Music Scholars Program, she taught students from low-income families for two years.

Nastasja has also performed with the renowned Philadelphia Virtuosi Chamber Orchestra.

During these years, she was a part of another ensemble, Tipica Messiez. In an interview with Meredith Klein, the director of the Philadelphia Tango School, Nastasja noted on the significance of this work. Orchestra Típica Messiez, a rare tango ensemble which Nastasja was a part of, is the only active ensemble of its kind in the United States. Nastasja performed for the 2019 Philadelphia Tango Festival, as part of Trio Messiez and Tipica Messiez.

DanceUS Team, who attended the event, reported about the festival:

"It's a grand occasion in all senses: live music orchestra (amazing!), big venue (Lithuanian Music Hall Association) that reminded of Salón Canning in Buenos Aires, great performances and amazing dancers!"

Nastasja is currently performing with Philadelphia String Quartet as their Lead Violinist.

== Notable Performances ==
Notable Solo and Chamber Recitals

- "Beethoven in a New Key" at the Mannes Sounds Festival
- Cultural Center "Budo Tomović" in Podgorica, Montenegro (2019)
- KotorArt Festival in Kotor, Montenegro (2019)
- Philadelphia Tango Festival 2019
- Nastasja & Friends at the Philadelphia Argentine Tango School (2019)
- La Mariposa Milonga (2019)
- Master's Recital at Temple University (2018)
- Cultural Center Bijelo Polje in Bijelo Polje, Montenegro (2018)
- Vae soli String Quartet at the Risto Ratković Memorial House, Bijelo Polje, Montenegro (2018)
- Guarnerius Art Center (2017)

Notable performances as soloist with orchestras

- Kolarac Concert Hall with Belgrade strings Dusan Skovran (2013)
- Main Stage of the National Theatre in Belgrade and Kolarac Concert Hall with the Youth Philharmonic Borislav Pascan (2011/2012 season)

== Awards ==
Notable Awards and Honors:

- International online competition Constantine the Great in Nis, Serbia (2020) – 1st prize
- Helen Kwalwasser Prize for excellence in the study of a stringed instrument at Temple University (2017/2018)
- Young Talents World Festival of Performing Arts (2018) – Special WWFM Award
- Nelly Berman Competition in Philadelphia (2017)
- International Competition "Petar Konjović" (2015)
- International Competition Donne in musica in Kragujevac (2014)
- International competition Jaroslav Kocian in Czech Republic (2010) – honorary mention of the 1st degree
- International Competition Alexander Glazunov in Paris, France (2007)

== Philadelphia String Quartet ==
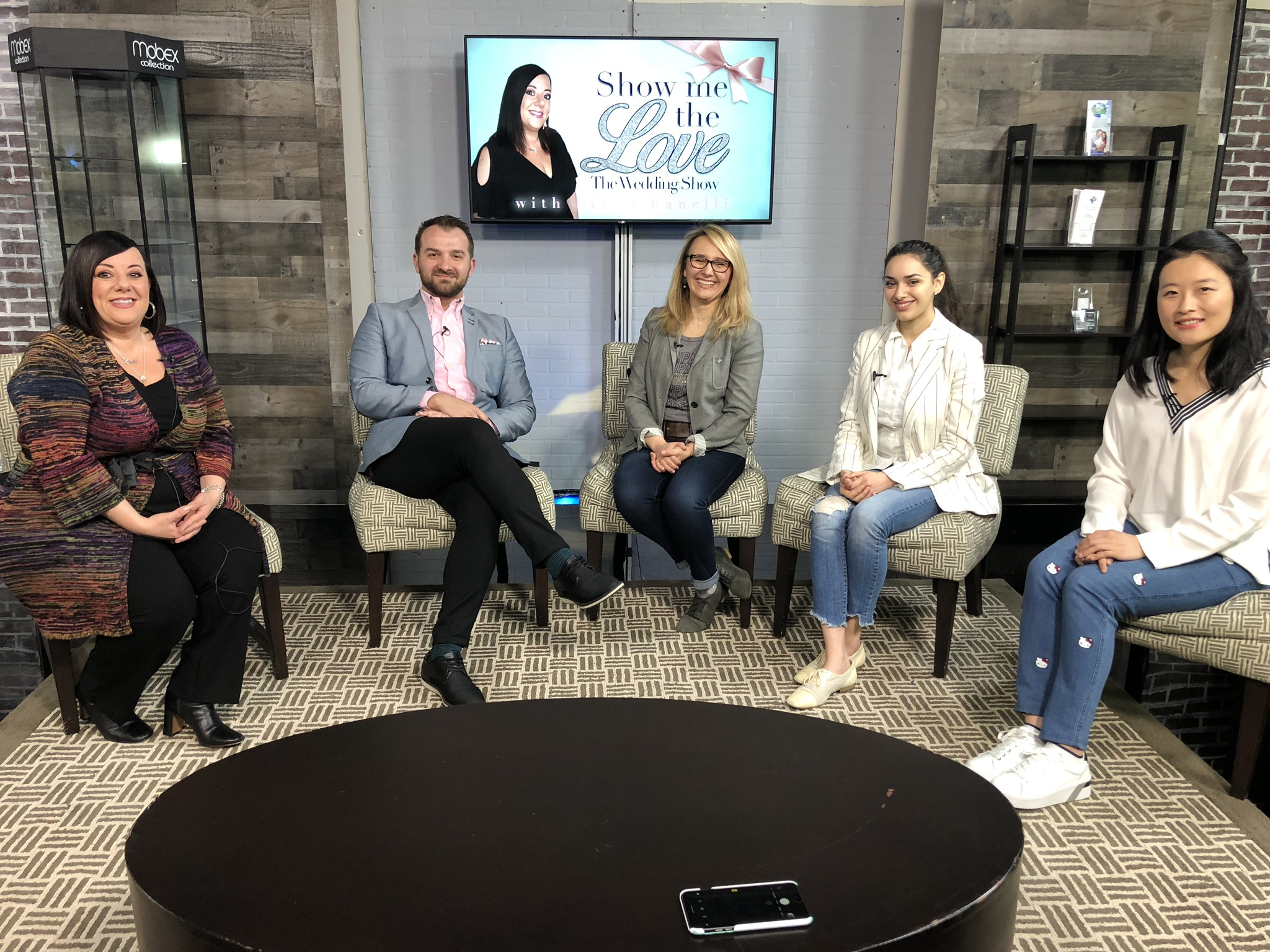
Philadelphia String Quartet at "Show Me The Love" program

Nastasja has been a part of Philadelphia String Quartet since 2017. Since then, the band has been performing across the United States and abroad. The PSQ writes string quartet arrangements of the latest pop hits, such as Sucker by Jonas Brothers, New Rules by Dua Lipa, Finesse by Bruno Mars, as well as original songs. In 2019 Philadelphia String Quartet signed an exclusive contract with the EastCoast Entertainment. Since July 2021, Nastasja has been the Lead Violinist of the Philadelphia String Quartet.

Philadelphia Magazine has said

"The Philadelphia String Quartet (PSQ) has range to spare: the group can expertly blend together the stylings of Bach and Bruno Mars to bring you a fun mix of the best of both classical music and today’s hits."

== Albums ==
- Killiam Shakespeare feat. Aloe Blacc – I'll Take You Home (2017)
- Ljubičice&Co by Ljubičice (2014)
