= OFK Durmitor =

- Full name: Omladinski fudbalski klub Durmitor
- Founded: 2001
- Dissolved: 2013
- Ground: Ravni Žabljak Stadium; Žabljak, Montenegro
- Capacity: 1,000
- Manager: Vitko Španjević

Omladinski fudbalski klub Durmitor is a Montenegrin football club based in Žabljak. They competed in the Montenegrin Third League, before the men's team was disbanded in 2013. Main coach before 2006 was Zeljko Milicevic.

== History ==
Founded in 2001, OFK Durmitor is among the youngest football teams in Montenegro and the only one from Durmitor mountain region. Coming from Žabljak, a town with highest elevation on the Balkans, OFK Durmitor started as an enthusiastic project, but soon played their first official games in the Montenegrin Fourth League - Northern Region.
Following Montenegrin independence, OFK Durmitor became a member of the Montenegrin Third League, but never succeeded to gain promotion to highest-rank competitions. OFK Durmitor's best result was made during the 2010–11 season when they finished as a third-placed team in the Montenegrin Third League - Northern Region.

== Final squad ==
During their last season in the Montenegrin Third League, OFK Durmitor played with following players: Drobnjak, M. Džaković, Đ. Španjević, Pašić, Bojović, Raonić, Damjanović, Radulović, Kovačević, Krsmanović. Pićurić, D. Džaković, Z. Španjević. Manager: Vitko Španjević.

== Women's team ==
Since 2008, Žabljak also hosts ŽFK Durmitor - a women's football team, which is a part of OFK Durmitor. ŽFK Durmitor participated in the inaugural season of the Montenegrin Women's League, as well as subsequent seasons.

== Stadium ==
OFK Durmitor plays their home games at Ravni Žabljak Stadium, built at the time of the team's foundation. The stadium has one stand, with a capacity of 1,000 seats. Situated on a high mountain, with extreme elevation, the pitch is under the snow during the winter months. Local authorities stated they're planning renovation of the stadium.

== See also ==
- Durmitor
- Montenegrin Third League
- Football in Montenegro
- Žabljak
