= Dragomir Brajković =

Serbian writer (1947–2009)

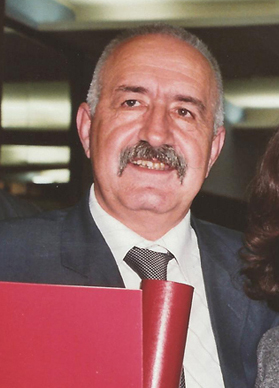
- Brajković in 2005
- Born: 10 December 1947; Pisana Jela, PR Montenegro, FPR Yugoslavia
- Died: 29 November 2009 (aged 61); Belgrade, Serbia
- Resting place: Belgrade New Cemetery
- Education: University of Belgrade Faculty of Philology
- Occupations: Poet, novelist
- Writing career
- Period: 1966–2009
- Notable work: Krvava svadba u Brzavi

Dragomir Brajković (Serbian Cyrillic: Драгомир Брајковић; 10 December 1947 – 29 November 2009) was a Serbian writer, journalist, editor of Radio Belgrade, poet and member of the Association of Writers of Serbia.

== Biography ==
He was born on 10 December 1947 in the village of Pisana Jela (Bijelo Polje Municipality) in present-day Montenegro. He graduated from the University of Belgrade Faculty of Philology. He began publishing poetry, prose, essays and critical texts in 1966.

He actively advocated the preservation of Serbian–Montenegrin unionism within the Federal Republic of Yugoslavia (1992–2003) and then within the state union of Serbia and Montenegro (2003–2006). In early 2005, he became one of the founders of the Serbian-based Movement for a European State Union of Serbia and Montenegro.

Brajković died from a stroke in his sleep on 29 November 2009. He is interred in the Alley of Distinguished Citizens in the Belgrade New Cemetery.
