= Football Association of Montenegro =

Governing body of association football in Montenegro

UEFA
- Short name: FSCG
- Founded: 8 March 1931; 95 years ago
- Headquarters: Podgorica
- FIFA affiliation: 31 May 2007; 19 years ago
- UEFA affiliation: 26 January 2007; 19 years ago
- President: Dejan Savićević
- Website: fscg.me

The Football Association of Montenegro (Montenegrin: Fudbalski savez Crne Gore, FSCG / Фудбалски савез Црне Горе, ФСЦГ) is the governing body of football in Montenegro. It is based in the capital, Podgorica.

The FSCG organises the Montenegrin First, Second and Third Leagues, which between them contain 48 clubs. It also organises the Montenegrin Women's League and the men's and women's Montenegrin Cups, as well as the Montenegro national football team and the Montenegro national under-21 football team.

The FSCG was established in 1931 as a sub-association within the Football Association of Yugoslavia. From 2003 until Montenegro declared independence in 2006, the FSCG was a sub-association within the Football Association of Serbia and Montenegro. It became a UEFA member in its own right in January 2007, and a FIFA member in May 2007.

Former player Dejan Savićević has served as the FSCG's president since 2004. No Montenegrin club side has ever qualified for a European club competition. Neither has the national team ever qualified for a UEFA Euros or a FIFA World Cup

== History ==
The Football Association of Montenegro was founded on 8 March 1931, under the name Cetinjski fudbalski podsavez ("Cetinje Football Subassociation") as a subdivision of the Football Association of Yugoslavia.

The Football Association of Montenegro was a part of the Football Association of Yugoslavia, the Football Association of FR Yugoslavia, and the Football Association of Serbia and Montenegro. On 28 June 2006 the Association became independent, following Montenegro becoming an independent country earlier that month. On 30 June 2006, it applied for membership in UEFA and FIFA. The Association joined UEFA on 26 January 2007 and joined FIFA on 31 May 2007.

== Camp FSCG and House of Football ==
Since 2008, the Football Association of Montenegro has owned one of the most modern training grounds in the Balkan Peninsula. Built in 2007, the centre is 54,000 sq meters. It is located on Ćemovsko polje, a plain at the Podgorica outskirts between the settlements of Stari Aerodrom and Konik. It consists of six pitches with stands and floodlights, and the House of Football - a seat of the Football Association of Montenegro.

Camp currently represents an important asset for the whole Montenegrin football system. Its grounds are home to all Montenegrin national teams (men and women) and numerous teams from Podgorica. The fields meet the criteria for Montenegrin First League games and UEFA competitions for young players.

=== House of Football ===
House of Football (Kuća fudbala) is a seat of the Football Association of Montenegro. The building opened on 21 May 2016.
On 3,240 sq meters, the building has modern facilities including reception, a museum, a press hall, the TV FSCG seat, administrative offices and meeting rooms.

=== FSCG training grounds ===
Behind the House of Football are two football pitches which belong to FSCG. Both have stands with a capacity of 1,000 seats and the main field has floodlights. Montenegro national football team use both stadiums as their training base before every single game.

Because it meets criteria for UEFA games, the main field is often home to Montenegro women's national football team, Montenegro national under-19 football team and Montenegro national under-17 football team games. Teams from the First and Second Montenegrin Leagues can always use the main ground for their matches, which is especially crucial during the stormy days, when their own stadiums are in bad condition.

=== Sponsorships ===
- Crnogorski Telekom AD
- Legea
- Diva
- Audi
- Meridianbet

== See also ==
- Camp FSCG
- Sport in Montenegro
- Football in Montenegro
- Football Association of Yugoslavia
- Montenegro national football team
- Montenegro women's national football team
- Montenegrin First League
- Montenegrin Second League
- Montenegrin Third League
- Montenegrin Women's League
- Montenegrin Cup
- Montenegrin Cup (women)
