= Ravni Žabljak Stadium =

Football stadium in Montenegro

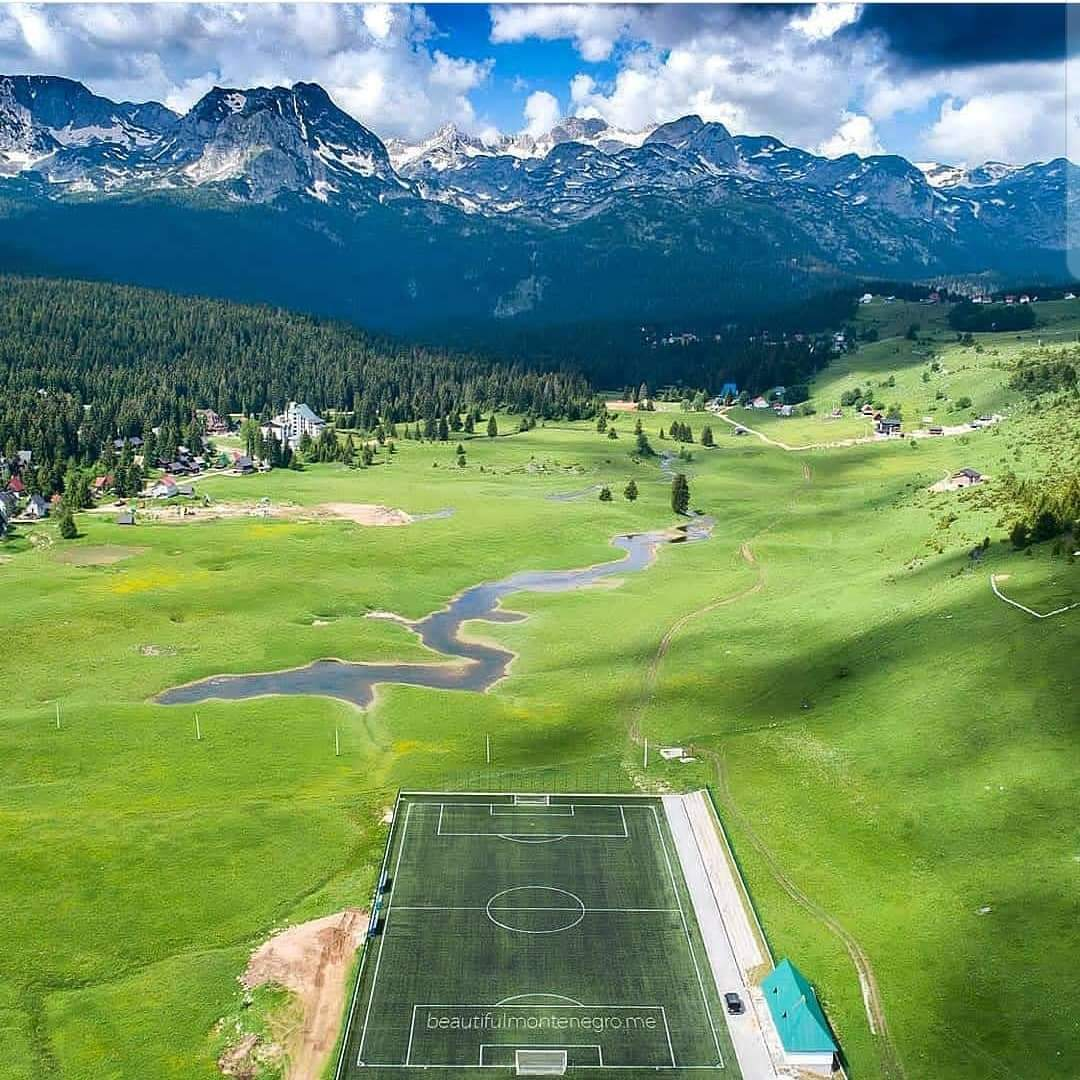
- Stadium Ravni Žabljak with mountain Durmitor behind
- Interactive map of Ravni Žabljak Stadium
- Full name: Stadion Ravni Žabljak
- Location: Žabljak, Montenegro
- Coordinates: 43.158292°N 19.117635°E
- Owner: Municipality of Žabljak
- Capacity: 1,000
- Surface: Artificial grass with rubber infill
- Field size: 110 x 65 m

Construction
- Built: 2001
- Renovated: 2018

Tenant
- OFK Durmitor

Ravni Žabljak Stadium is a football stadium in Žabljak, Montenegro. Situated on Durmitor mountain, in the town with highest elevation on the Balkans, it is used for football matches. The stadium is home to OFK Durmitor.

== History ==
The stadium was built at the time of OFK Durmitor foundation. The stadium has one stand, with a capacity of 1,000 seats. It is situated on a high mountain with extreme elevation. During the winter months, the pitch is under the snow. Local authorities have stated they're planning a renovation of the stadium.

== Pitch and conditions ==
The pitch measures 110 x 65 meters. The stadium meets criteria only for Montenegrin Third League games, not for highest-rank competitions. Due to heavy snow during the winter months, many games are playing under the hard conditions.

== See also ==
- OFK Durmitor
- Žabljak
- Durmitor
