= Tešanj RK =

Bosnian rugby club

Tešanj Ragbi klub
- Location: Tešanj, Bosnia and Herzegovina

Tešanj RK is a Bosnian rugby club based in Tešanj. Because of a lack of player numbers they currently play in a joint team with RK Gladijatori Derventa.
