= Risto Ratković =

Writer and diplomat (1903–1954)

Risto Ratković (3 September 1903 – 18 June 1954) was a Serbian avant-garde (surrealist) writer and diplomat.

== Biography ==
He was born in an impoverished trading family in Bijelo Polje in Montenegro. He finished Gymnasium in Novi Pazar, and in 1923 went to Belgrade where he enrolled in Faculty of Philosophy. In the period from 1927 to 1931. he worked in the Ministry of Education and the Ministry of Foreign Affairs, and spent seven years in the diplomatic service in France, Soviet Union and Egypt (1938–1945). He returned home in 1945.

== Literary work ==
=== Literary Orientation ===
Ratković belongs to the moderately modernist, and ideologically leftist orientation in Serbian expressionism, which in the further course of interwar literature approached Serbian Surrealism and social literature, but still remained independent. He was the main figure of that group and contributed the most to its theoretical self-determination.

=== Understanding poetry ===
He presented his understanding of poetry in the program article "On Surrealism from My Life". In form and intention, the article is reminiscent of the explanation of "Sumatra" of Miloš Crnjanski, and the poetry is explained mostly in the mystical key of the song entitled "Maybe Sleeping" by Vladislav Petković Dis. Ratković understood surrealism as bringing a dream into reality, and he expressed his poetic determination with the somewhat brutal motto "to rape reality with a dream". A song is created in a dream, it is a photograph of a dream, and the role of reason is secondary, it only organizes the poetic material.

=== Poetry ===
Continuing Vladislav Petković Dis's visionary, dreamy line of Serbian poetry, Ratković sees secret connections and elusive meanings in everything. Similar to Dis and Rade Drainac, he was a newcomer from the province. It is deeply ingrained patriarchal sense of life and the mysticism of the primitive mentality. On this basis, the ideas were upgraded in the twentieth century with Freud psychoanalysis, atheism and Marxism. This meeting of mentality and education brought Ratković's poetry unusual visions, contacts with the afterlife, communication with unknown beings or with dead, close people. These poetic images are concretized in sudden metaphors and unusual syntactic twists, which affects the partial or complete absence of a strictly understood logic.

The language of his poetry seems clumsy, torn as if trying to tell us some deep secret or tonight's dream.

These features are especially characteristic of songs from the earlier period of creation, in the collection "Dead Gloves" and the short poem "Leviathan". Among them, the song "Midnight of me" (Ponoc Mene) stands out, created during night vigils in front of the shadow of a dead woman. In another poem, the poet is so convinced of the reality of the dead that he is surprised that his dead wife does not appear to him ("you are dead and you are not there").

In the thirties, Ratković also wrote social poems, but they are few and poetically weaker.

His diplomatic mission in Egypt brought the last collection of poems "From the Orient" (Sa Orijenta). It poetically deals with the experience of Saharan Desert, Oriental Misery and Mediterranean Sun, as well as contact with the history and present of the Middle East.

=== Prose ===
Ratković also wrote a short novel Nevidbog ("Invisible God").Nevidbog is a kind of family sage, a story about the downfall of some and the rise of other families in his homeland. The novel is composed as a series of independent stories, and among the best are those about the main character's memories of his childhood and his experiences under Austrian occupation. It was first published in 1933 and many more times since.

He also wrote [essays] on literary issues and criticism of certain books.

== Works (partial list) ==
- "Dead Gloves" and "Leviathan" (1927), collections of poems,
- "Silences on Literature" (1928), essays,
- "Dawn" (Zora, 1929), Drama,
- "Invisible God" (Nevidbog, 1933), Novel,
- "Touches" (1952), A selection from poetry,
- "From the Orient" (Sa Orijenta, 1955), travel prose.
- Risto Ratković (1962)
- Poetry (Poezija, 1991)
- Selected Poems: Roman, drama - Volume 1-4 (Izabrana djela)

== Legacy ==
- Risto Ratković Award: Since 1973, "Ratković's Poetry Evenings" were awarded the Ratković Prize for a book of poetry.
