= Ragbi klub Krstaši =

Montenegrin rugby union club, based in Kotor

- Nickname: Krstaši (Crusaders)
- Founded: 2011; 15 years ago
- Location: Kotor, Montenegro
- President: Nebojša Labović
- Coach: Nebojša Labović
Team kit

Ragbi klub Krstaši is a Montenegrin rugby union club based in Kotor.

== History ==
Ragbi klub Krstaši played Montenegro Sevens Championship in 2013. The club is currently inactive as of 2014.

== Current squad ==
- Miloš Mrdak
- Miloš Ojdanić
- Nikola Potpara
- Nikola Vučurović
- Darko Kustudić
- Loran Gečević
- Aleksandar Ivanović
- Anto Petrović
- Lazar Krivokapić

== Coaches and assistants ==
- Nebojša Labović
