= Stadion u Parku =

Football stadium in Tivat

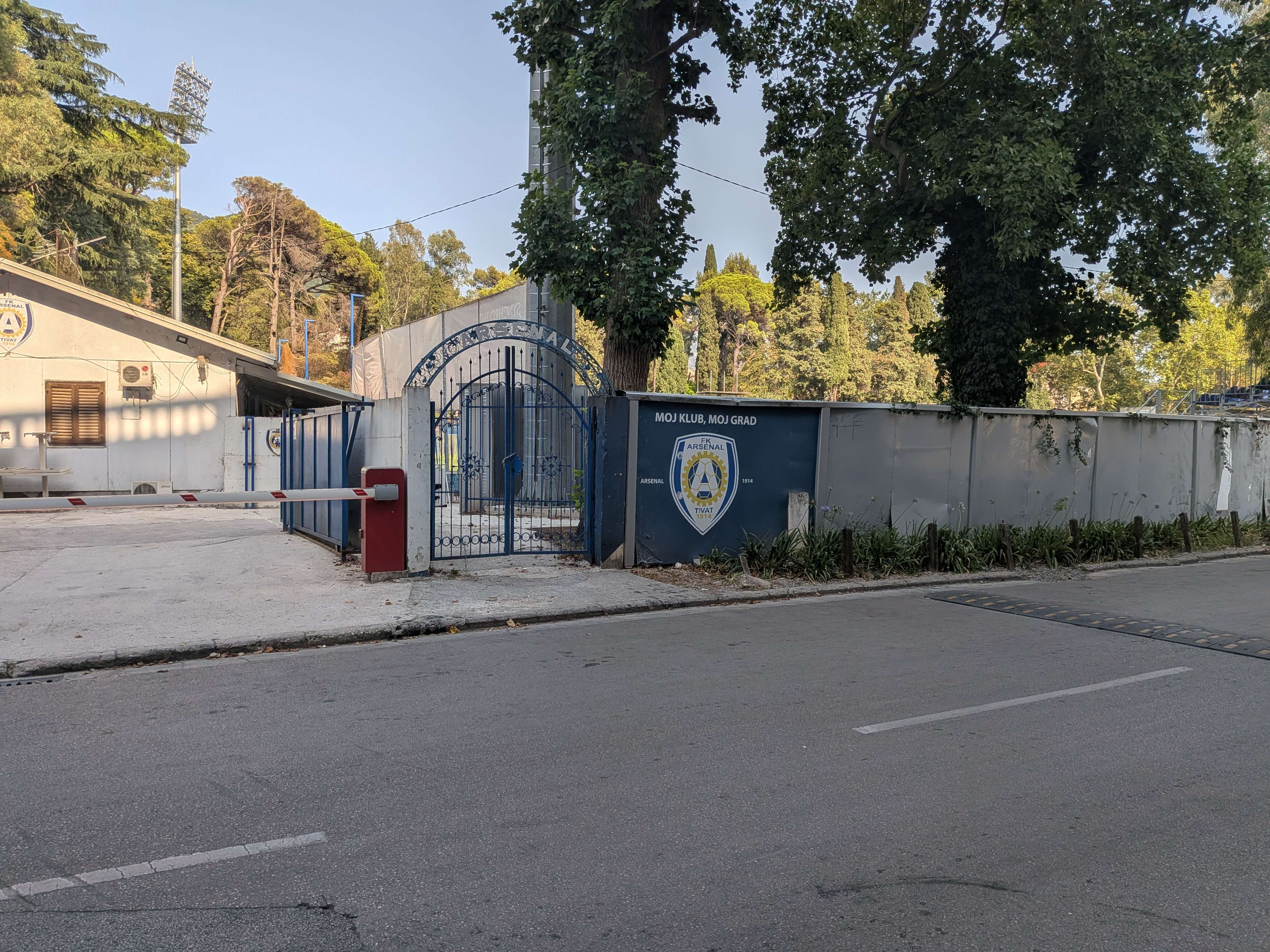
- The stadium's main entrance, 2026
- Interactive map of Stadion u Parku
- Full name: Stadion u Parku
- Location: Tivat, Montenegro
- Coordinates: 42.432531°N 18.695344°E
- Owner: Municipality of Tivat
- Capacity: 1,200
- Surface: grass
- Field size: 105 m × 65 m (344 ft × 213 ft)

Construction
- Built: 1945

Tenants
- FK Arsenal, RFC Arsenal

Stadion u Parku is a football stadium in Tivat. It is currently used mostly for football and rugby matches and is the home ground of FK Arsenal and RFC Arsenal. The stadium holds 2,000 people.

== History and location ==
The stadium is located in Tivat's City Park and it has capacity of 2,000 seats. It is situated near the Adriatic coast and by Porto Montenegro Marina.
During most of its history, the stadium is used for football matches. From 2011, the stadium is the home venue of Rugby union team RFC Arsenal.

== Pitch and conditions ==
The pitch measures 110 x 65 meters. Stadium didn't met UEFA criteria for European competitions.

== See also ==
- FK Arsenal
- RFC Arsenal
- Tivat
