= Montenegrin Cup (women) =

Kup Crne Gore za žene
- Founded: 2015
- Region: Montenegro
- Teams: 8 (2015–16)
- Current champions: Ekonomist (1st title)
- Most championships: Ekonomist (1 title)

The Montenegrin Cup for Women (Montenegrin: Kup Crne Gore za žene) is the national women's association football cup competition in Montenegro. It was founded in 2015, seven years after the formation of the Montenegrin Women's League.

== History ==
After the establishment of Montenegrin Women's League in 2008, the Football Association of Montenegro organised the first edition of Montenegrin Women's Cup for the 2015–16 season. The inaugural season of the Montenegrin Women's Cup had seven participants, with the first round being the quarterfinals.
The first winner of Montenegrin Cup was ŽFK Ekonomist.

== Finals ==
The finals played so far are:

Year	Winner	Result	Runners-up	Venue	Attendance
2015–16	ŽFK Ekonomist	3–1	ŽFK Mladost	Podgorica	300

== Trophies by team ==
Club	Winners	Runners-up	Winning years
ŽFK Ekonomist Nikšić	1	-	2015–16
ŽFK Mladost Podgorica	-	1	

== See also ==
- Montenegrin Women's League
- Football Association of Montenegro
- Football in Montenegro
- Montenegrin Cup
