= RK Gladijatori Derventa =

Ragbi klub Gladijatori Derventa
- Nickname(s): Gladijatori (Gladiators)
- Location: Derventa, Bosnia and Herzegovina

RK Gladijatori Derventa is a Bosnian rugby club based in Derventa. As of 2013 they are the only rugby team in Republika Srpska.
