= Ragbi Klub Mornar Bar =

Montenegrin rugby union club, based in Bar

- Founded: 2013; 13 years ago
- Location: Bar, Montenegro
- Ground: Toplica
- President: Srdjan Grigić
- League: Montenegrin National Championship
Team kit

Ragbi Klub Mornar Bar (Montenegrin:Рагби клуб Морнар Бар, English: Rugby Club Mornar Bar) is a Montenegrin rugby union club based in Bar, Montenegro. It was founded in 2013. The club plays in the Montenegrin national division. During its first match in Bar, Mornar played against Nikšić on April 19, 2014.

== Current squad ==
The provisional Mornar Bar Rugby Squad for the 2022–23 season is:

Mornar Bar Rugby Squad
| **Props**: Jovan Petrović; Luka Grgić; Nikola Barjaktarović; Alen Hekalo; **Hookers**: **Mijo Martinović**; **Vuk Vukcević**; **Locks**: **Aleksandar Mečikukić**; Marko Rakocević; Milos Pantović | **Loose forwards**: Milun Pejušković; Lazar Milović; Vasilije Vasilije; **Scrum-halves**: Darko Perkolić; Luka Banović; **Fly-halves**: **Djordje Marštjepović**; Teodor Tomić | **Centres**: **Dušan Vućicević (C)**; Gojko Tomić; **Wingers**: Dino Fejzović; Mitar Daković; Milan Savić; **Fullbacks**: Vladan Mihailović; Zoran Delibašić |
(c) Denotes team captain, **Bold** denotes player is internationally capped
