= List of Montenegro national rugby union players =

This is a List of Montenegro national rugby unit players.

As of 1 May 2018 there have been 46 rugby players that have represented Montenegro in rugby union. This is the list of every player that has gotten an official cap while playing in an official tournament or test match. (Does not include friendlies played)

== List of Montenegro National Rugby Players ==
| Number | Name | Test Debut | Opposition | Played at | Caps | Points | Tries | Con | Pens | DGs | Rugby Club |
|---|---|---|---|---|---|---|---|---|---|---|---|
| 1 | Janko Milović | 11 April 2015 | Estonia | Bar, Montenegro | 2 | 0 | 0 | 0 | 0 | 0 | Arsenal |
| 2 | Budimir Andrić * | 11 April 2015 | Estonia | Bar, Montenegro | 6 | 0 | 0 | 0 | 0 | 0 | Podgorica |
| 3 | **Luka Lučić** | 11 April 2015 | Estonia | Bar, Montenegro | 10 | 5 | 1 | 0 | 0 | 0 | Podgorica |
| 4 | Nikola Vuletić | 11 April 2015 | Estonia | Bar, Montenegro | 10 | 0 | 0 | 0 | 0 | 0 | Nikšić |
| 5 | Aleksandar Mečikukić | 11 April 2015 | Estonia | Bar, Montenegro | 7 | 0 | 0 | 0 | 0 | 0 | Mornar |
| 6 | Vladimir Tomović | 11 April 2015 | Estonia | Bar, Montenegro | 3 | 0 | 0 | 0 | 0 | 0 | Mornar |
| 7 | **Boris Mijušković *** | 11 April 2015 | Estonia | Bar, Montenegro | 12 | 5 | 1 | 0 | 0 | 0 | Nikšić |
| 8 | Aleksandar Milosavljević * | 11 April 2015 | Estonia | Bar, Montenegro | 9 | 10 | 2 | 0 | 0 | 0 | Podgorica |
| 9 | Nikola Jovanović * | 11 April 2015 | Estonia | Bar, Montenegro | 3 | 0 | 0 | 0 | 0 | 0 | Arsenal |
| 10 | Srđan Popović * | 11 April 2015 | Estonia | Bar, Montenegro | 9 | 45 | 0 | 9 | 9 | 0 | Arsenal |
| 11 | Aleksandar Bulatović * | 11 April 2015 | Estonia | Bar, Montenegro | 2 | 0 | 0 | 0 | 0 | 0 | Podgorica |
| 12 | Danilo Ađžić * | 11 April 2015 | Estonia | Bar, Montenegro | 5 | 0 | 0 | 0 | 0 | 0 | Cetnije |
| 13 | Dušan Vučičević * | 11 April 2015 | Estonia | Bar, Montenegro | 11 | 35 | 7 | 0 | 0 | 0 | Mornar |
| 14 | Marko Andrić * | 11 April 2015 | Estonia | Bar, Montenegro | 12 | 34 | 5 | 0 | 3 | 0 | Podgorica |
| 15 | Boško Mirjacić | 11 April 2015 | Estonia | Bar, Montenegro | 6 | 5 | 1 | 0 | 0 | 0 | Nikšić |
| 16 | Dimitrije Čvorović * | 11 April 2015 | Estonia | Bar, Montenegro | 7 | 0 | 0 | 0 | 0 | 0 | Nikšić |
| 17 | Milan Martinović | 11 April 2015 | Estonia | Bar, Montenegro | 3 | 0 | 0 | 0 | 0 | 0 | Mornar |
| 18 | Marko Jaredić | 11 April 2015 | Estonia | Bar, Montenegro | 2 | 0 | 0 | 0 | 0 | 0 | Podgorica |
| 19 | Mirko Garčević * | 11 April 2015 | Estonia | Bar, Montenegro | 8 | 10 | 2 | 0 | 0 | 0 | Podgorica |
| 20 | Igor Adžip | 11 April 2015 | Estonia | Bar, Montenegro | 2 | 0 | 0 | 0 | 0 | 0 | Arsenal |
| 21 | Marko Novaković * | 11 April 2015 | Estonia | Bar, Montenegro | 5 | 5 | 1 | 0 | 0 | 0 | Arsenal |
| 22 | Aljoša Marinković * | 11 April 2015 | Estonia | Bar, Montenegro | 3 | 0 | 0 | 0 | 0 | 0 | Arsenal/Vojvodina |
| 23 | Vladan Čelebić * | 14 April 2015 | Slovakia | Budva, Montenegro | 8 | 0 | 0 | 0 | 0 | 0 | Podgorica |
| 24 | Miloš Kuvelja | 14 April 2015 | Slovakia | Budva, Montenegro | 2 | 0 | 0 | 0 | 0 | 0 | Nikšić |
| 25 | Nemanja Stojanovski | 18 May 2016 | Estonia | Tallinn, Estonia | 2 | 0 | 0 | 0 | 0 | 0 | Nikšić |
| 26 | Djordje Marstjepović * | 18 May 2016 | Estonia | Tallinn, Estonia | 5 | 5 | 1 | 0 | 0 | 0 | Mornar |
| 27 | Damijan Celebić * | 18 May 2016 | Estonia | Tallinn, Estonia | 7 | 15 | 3 | 0 | 0 | 0 | Podgorica |
| 28 | Goran Vujović * | 18 May 2016 | Estonia | Tallinn, Estonia | 4 | 5 | 1 | 0 | 0 | 0 | Arsenal |
| 29 | Duško Stanković | 18 May 2016 | Estonia | Tallinn, Estonia | 5 | 0 | 0 | 0 | 0 | 0 | Nikšić |
| 30 | Vuk Vukcević | 18 May 2016 | Estonia | Tallinn, Estonia | 2 | 0 | 0 | 0 | 0 | 0 | Mornar |
| 31 | Stefan Djinović * | 18 May 2016 | Estonia | Tallinn, Estonia | 3 | 0 | 0 | 0 | 0 | 0 | Podgorica |
| 32 | Danilo Ceranić | 18 May 2016 | Estonia | Tallinn, Estonia | 2 | 0 | 0 | 0 | 0 | 0 | Podgorica |
| 33 | Marko Kuć | 21 May 2016 | Belarus | Tallinn, Estonia | 5 | 2 | 0 | 1 | 0 | 0 | Podgorica |
| 34 | Goran Krskonijević | 21 May 2016 | Belarus | Tallinn, Estonia | 1 | 0 | 0 | 0 | 0 | 0 | Podgorica |
| 35 | Mitar Bošković * | 21 May 2016 | Belarus | Tallinn, Estonia | 3 | 0 | 0 | 0 | 0 | 0 | Arsenal |
| 36 | Bojan Miždalo * | 5 November 2016 | Gibraltar | Tivat, Montenegro | 4 | 0 | 0 | 0 | 0 | 0 | Arsenal |
| 37 | Milorad Marković * | 5 November 2016 | Gibraltar | Tivat, Montenegro | 2 | 0 | 0 | 0 | 0 | 0 | Podgorica |
| 38 | Milan Radović* | 14 May 2017 | Slovakia | Tivat, Montenegro | 4 | 0 | 0 | 0 | 0 | 0 | Vichy |
| 39 | Novica Raonić * | 14 May 2017 | Slovakia | Tivat, Montenegro | 6 | 0 | 0 | 0 | 0 | 0 | Nikšić |
| 40 | Aleksandar Roganović* | 14 May 2017 | Slovakia | Tivat, Montenegro | 4 | 10 | 2 | 0 | 0 | 0 | Nikšić |
| 41 | Ivan Perović | 14 May 2017 | Slovakia | Tivat, Montenegro | 3 | 0 | 0 | 0 | 0 | 0 | Nikšić |
| 42 | Damir Abdinović * | 20 May 2017 | Bulgaria | Tivat, Montenegro | 1 | 0 | 0 | 0 | 0 | 0 | Arsenal |
| 43 | Ivan Jelic | 14 April 2017 | Bulgaria | Niksic, Montenegro | 3 | 0 | 0 | 0 | 0 | 0 | Podgorica |
| 44 | Martin Lusty | 14 April 2017 | Bulgaria | Niksic, Montenegro | 1 | 0 | 0 | 0 | 0 | 0 | PSNI |
| 45 | Lazar Cavor | 14 April 2017 | Bulgaria | Niksic, Montenegro | 2 | 5 | 1 | 0 | 0 | 0 | Northwood Boys High |
| 46 | Zeljko Popovic | 14 April 2017 | Bulgaria | Niksic, Montenegro | 1 | 0 | 0 | 0 | 0 | 0 | Cetnije |
| 47 | Nikola Lagator | 30 August 2021 | Bosnia and Herzegovina | Zenica, Bosnia and Herzegovina | 2 | 0 | 0 | 0 | 0 | 0 | Cetnije |
| 48 | Nikola Luketa* | 30 August 2021 | Bosnia and Herzegovina | Zenica, Bosnia and Herzegovina | 2 | 0 | 0 | 0 | 0 | 0 | Bar |
| 49 | Miloš Vujić | 30 August 2021 | Bosnia and Herzegovina | Zenica, Bosnia and Herzegovina | 1 | 0 | 0 | 0 | 0 | 0 | Cetnije |
| 50 | Stefan Georgiev | 30 August 2022 | Bosnia and Herzegovina | Zenica, Bosnia and Herzegovina | 1 | 0 | 0 | 0 | 0 | 0 | Podgorica |
| 51 | Ivan Colaković | 30 August 2022 | Bosnia and Herzegovina | Zenica, Bosnia and Herzegovina | 2 | 0 | 0 | 0 | 0 | 0 | Cetnije |
| 52 | Goran Novaković* | 8 October 2022 | Serbia | Belgrade, Serbia | 2 | 0 | 0 | 0 | 0 | 0 | Bar |
| 53 | Luka Grgić | 8 October 2022 | Serbia | Belgrade, Serbia | 1 | 0 | 0 | 0 | 0 | 0 | Bar |
| 54 | Alen Hekalo | 8 October 2022 | Serbia | Belgrade, Serbia | 2 | 0 | 0 | 0 | 0 | 0 | Bar |
| 55 | Miloš Loncar | 8 October 2022 | Serbia | Belgrade, Serbia | 1 | 0 | 0 | 0 | 0 | 0 | Bar |
| 56 | Blago Lukacević* | 8 October 2022 | Serbia | Belgrade, Serbia | 3 | 0 | 0 | 0 | 0 | 0 | Podgorica |
| 57 | Danilo Djalović | 8 October 2022 | Serbia | Belgrade, Serbia | 2 | 0 | 0 | 0 | 0 | 0 | Arsenal |
| 58 | Damijan Nikcević | 8 October 2022 | Serbia | Belgrade, Serbia | 2 | 0 | 0 | 0 | 0 | 0 | Niksic |
| 59 | Igor Lucić | 8 October 2022 | Serbia | Belgrade, Serbia | 1 | 0 | 0 | 0 | 0 | 0 | Podgorica |
| 60 | Martin Mijušković* | 8 October 2022 | Serbia | Belgrade, Serbia | 2 | 0 | 0 | 0 | 0 | 0 | Niksic |
| 61 | Stefan Popović | 8 October 2022 | Serbia | Belgrade, Serbia | 2 | 0 | 0 | 0 | 0 | 0 | Podgorica |

- the star shows that they have played for the national seven's team and **bold** means they have captained the team
