= Ragbi klub Budućnost =

Montenegrin rugby union club, based in Podgorica

- Nickname: Budućnost (Future)
- Founded: 2012; 14 years ago
- Location: Podgorica, Montenegro
Team kit

Ragbi klub Budućnost is a Montenegrin rugby union club based in Podgorica.
Rugby Club Budućnost is a part of Budućnost Podgorica sports society.

The club is sponsored by Meridianbet.
