= Ragbi klub Podgorica =

Montenegrin rugby union club, based in Podgorica

Podgorica Rugby Club
- Founded: 25 August 2015; 10 years ago
- Location: Podgorica, Montenegro
- Ground: Tološi Stadium (Capacity: 300 (seated))
- President: Flip Maraš
- Coach: Marty Lusty
- League: Montenegrin national division
- 2015/16: -
Team kit

Official website
- www.facebook.com/Ragbi-Klub-Podgorica-155310778141039/

Ragbi_klub_Podgorica (Podgorica rugby club) is a rugby union club founded in August 2015. The club has had a good opening season by being undefeated in its opening season. Also the club has contributed the most players to the national team of Montenegro. (13 of the 25 in the current squad)

== Squad ==
The provisional Podgorica Rugby Squad for the 2016–17 season are:

Podgorica Rugby Squad
**Props**: **Goran Krstonijevic**; **Luka Lučić**; **Marko Jaredić**; **Hookers**: **Budimir Andrić**; Vuk Sandić; **Locks**: **Danilo Ćeranić**; **Aleksandar Milosavljević**; Filip Maraš; Marko Bulatović; Ivan Jelić	**Loose forwards**: **Stefan Đinović**; **Mirko Garcevic**; Nikola Jočić; Nikola Maksan; **Scrum-halves**: Danilo Đalović; **Fly-halves**: **Goran Vujović**; **Marko Kuč**; **Stefan Georgiev**; **Centres**: **Damijan Čelebić**; **Vladan Čelebić**; Boško Đikanović; **Milorad Marković**; Filip Perutović; **Wingers**: Vladimir Filipović; Balsa Stanović; Dusan Ivanović; Savo Miljenović; **Fullbacks**: **Marko Andrić**; **Mitar Bošković**
(c) Denotes team captain, **Bold** denotes player is internationally capped
