= Nemila =

- Village
- Location within Bosnia and Herzegovina
- Coordinates: 44.326548°N 17.8988742°E
- Country: Bosnia and Herzegovina
- Entity: Federation of Bosnia and Herzegovina
- Canton: Zenica-Doboj
- Municipality: Zenica

Area
  - Total: 6.99 sq mi (18.11 km^{2})

Population (2013)
  - Total: 2,508
  - Density: 358.7/sq mi (138.5/km^{2})
- Time zone: UTC+1 (CET)
  - Summer (DST): UTC+2 (CEST)

Nemila is a village in the City of Zenica, Bosnia and Herzegovina. It is located on the banks of the River Bosna.

== Demographics ==
According to the 2013 census, its population was 2,508.

Ethnicity in 2013
Ethnicity	Number	Percentage
Bosniaks	2,372	94.6%
Croats	21	0.8%
Serbs	7	0.3%
other/undeclared	108	4.3%
Total	2,508	100%
