= Football in Montenegro =

- Country: Montenegro
- Governing body: Football Association of Montenegro
- National team: Men's national team

International competitions
- Champions League; Europa League; Europa Conference League; Super Cup; FIFA Club World Cup; FIFA World Cup (National Team); European Championship (National Team); UEFA Nations League (National Team)

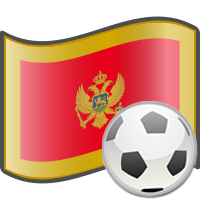

Montenegro was independent from the Late Middle Ages until 1918, when it declared its union with Serbia and, subsequently, became part of various incarnations of Yugoslavia and the state union of Serbia and Montenegro. During this time, football in Montenegro was part of the wider Yugoslavian structures. As a result of the Montenegrin independence referendum held on May 21, 2006, Montenegro declared independence two weeks later, on June 3, and formed its own football association. Association football is the most popular sport in Montenegro.

== History ==
=== Pre-2006 ===
Football in Montenegro, when it was part of Yugoslavia, was organised first by the Football Association of Yugoslavia, founded in 1919 and renamed the Football Association of Serbia and Montenegro in 2003. Yugoslavia, later Serbia and Montenegro, was one of the leading countries in European football. They twice reached the semi-finals of the World Cup (in 1930 and 1962) and twice finished runners-up in the European Championships (in 1960 and 1968). The first player from Montenegro to play in a World Cup was Milovan Jakšić who was the Yugoslav goalkeeper at 1930 World Cup. Ever since, Montenegrins were usually well represented in the Yugoslav and Serbia and Montenegro teams, and some, such as Dragoljub Brnović, Dejan Savićević and Predrag Mijatović, became among the most prominent Yugoslav players of all time.

Initially, in the period between the two world wars, football in Yugoslavia was organised regionally. Each region had its own football subassociation which was responsible for organising its own league system which would organise the club in league competitions separated by vertically organised leagues. The top league would be formed by the best clubs within the subassociation and the winner would qualify to the Yugoslav championship where it would meet with the winners of all the other subassociations. There was no country of Montenegro at that time, but the territory of today's Montenegro was included in the form of Zeta banovina which, along with the modern territory of Montenegro, compromised the coast of Dubrovnik including the Pelješac peninsula, Eastern Herzegovina, the Raška region of modern Serbia, and western parts of Kosovo and Metohija.

The Zeta banovina had its football subassociation, formed in March 1931 in Cetinje, which was thus known as the Cetinje Football Subassociation. Since that year, the Cetinje subassociation formed its league system and would organise competition regularly, as would the other Yugoslav subassociations.

The Cetinje subassociation top league was marked by the rivalry between the two major clubs, SK Crnogorac from Cetinje, and SK Balšić from Podgorica. Before the Second World War, Crnogorac was the only Montenegrin club to play in the final stage of Yugoslav Championship, and it was only on one occasion, in the 1935–36 championship, which was played in a cup system.

Later, after 1945, the best Montenegrin clubs usually played in the Yugoslav First League. The Montenegrin Republic League was the highest league played on a Montenegrin level. It formed part of the third or fourth (depending on the exact period) tier of football in Yugoslavia. The Montenegrin First League was formed in 2004 as the local second tier and, after Montenegrin independence in 2006, it became country's top level.

=== 2006 FIFA World Cup ===
Following Montenegro's independence in June 2006, the Serbian team was seen as the successors to the Serbia and Montenegro team. However, at the 2006 FIFA World Cup, held in the latter half of June and in July 2006, Serbia and Montenegro continued to play, representing the two independent states of Serbia and Montenegro. Despite an impressive record in qualification for the tournament, the team struggled in a tough first round group and were eliminated having won no games, conceded ten goals and scored just two. After the tournament, the team disbanded and was replaced by Serbia.

=== Post-independence ===
The Football Association of Montenegro had been in existent as a sub-federation since March 1931, but applied for independent membership of FIFA and UEFA on June 30, 2006. Full membership of UEFA was given in January 2007. Meanwhile, the association had continued to run the Montenegrin First League as the new country's premier football competition. The winners of this would enter European competition in 2007. The new national team was organised and its debut fixture was against Hungary in Podgorica on 24 March 2007. The Montenegrin side won the match 2–1.

== Domestic competitions ==
Exclusively domestic competition started in Montenegro when Cetinje Football Subassociation started its regular league championship in 1931.

Nowadays, the top-tier football competition in Montenegro is the Montenegrin First League. It is at the top of a pyramid of three leagues, of which the lowest, the Montenegrin Third League, is split into three regional competitions (North, Central, South). Since 2007, the champions of the Montenegrin First League enter the qualification for the UEFA Champions League; the runners-up and third-placed team enter the UEFA Europa League, alongside the Montenegrin Cup winner.

The Montenegrin Cup is the main cup competition. Lower-tier teams play in the Montenegrin Regional Cups, which have three divisions.

Women's competitions have existed since 2008. Top-tier competition is the Montenegrin Women's League, whose champion plays to qualify for the UEFA Women's Champions League. Another competition is the Montenegrin Cup (women).

=== League system ===
==== Men's football ====
Level	League(s)/Division(s)
1	Telekom 1.CFL; 10 clubs
	↓↑ 1-3 clubs
2	Druga Liga; 10 clubs
	↓↑ 2 clubs
3	Montenegrin Third League; 28 clubs

==== Women's football ====
Level	League(s)/Division(s)
1	Montenegrin Women's League; 8 clubs

==== Futsal ====
Level	League(s)/Division(s)
1	Montenegrin Futsal First League; 10 clubs

=== Cup Competitions ===
- Montenegrin Cup
- Montenegrin Regional Cups
- Montenegrin Cup (women)

== National team ==
The Montenegro national team played its first match in Podgorica on March 24, 2007, when they beat Hungary 2–1. Its home stadium is Podgorica City Stadium and its coach is Montenegrin footballer Zoran Filipović. Montenegro are members of UEFA and play in a red kit with yellow trim. After independence in June 2006, Montenegro was still represented by the Serbia and Montenegro team which had qualified for the 2006 FIFA World Cup. Serbia and Montenegro's final game in this tournament, a 3–2 defeat against Ivory Coast, was the final game for the unified side.

The unofficial debut Montenegro national team match was on 18 May 1939. The controversy involves the meaning or designation of national team. The team of Montenegrin players that travelled to the Yugoslav (now Serbian) capital Belgrade by mid May 1939, which was formed of players from Podgorica, Tivat, Kotor and Cetinje, corresponded with what was the first attempt to gather the best Montenegrin players in one team and play against an adversary. The team was not known as Montenegro, or anything of the kind, but was the selection of the best players of the Cetinje subassociation. Other subassociations within Yugoslavia had a long tradition of selecting their best players to form a team which would be the subassociation selection. However, this was the first time the Cetinje subassociation had done so and, since the Cetinje subassociation corresponded to Zeta banovina, which in turn corresponded to both historical and modern Montenegro, this team was considered to be Montenegro's best selection of players and thus, unofficially, the Montenegro national team. They travelled to Belgrade to play against the strong Belgrade subassociation team, and the game was to be a prelude to great FIFA-sponsored game between Yugoslavia and England. Both games were to be played at the BSK stadium, which at time had a capacity of 30.000 spectators and was the biggest and most modern in the Balkans; after Second World War and reconstruction it became the Partizan Stadium.

That year, the Football Association of Yugoslavia was celebrating its 20th birthday, and the decision to mark the occasion with an exhibition game with no less than the cradle of modern football, England, cost Yugoslav FA 240,000 Yugoslav Dinars at time. The decision for the prelude to be a match between the Belgrade and Cetinje subassociations was mostly made by Đuro Čejović, the then president of the Cetinje subassociation who was already in the process of becoming the Minister of Sports in Dragiša Cvetković's cabinet, a nomination that became official slightly less than a month after the event.

The organization of the Belgrade vs Cetinje game was delegated to Cetinje subassociation secretary, Milan Bokan, and his assistant, Vlada Mitrović, while the technicalities were the responsibility of 33-year old Milan Becić, who had already played with the local Podgorica and Cetinje teams and, internationally, Montpellier and CA Paris. As they had time to prepare, the game was filled with pride and prestige on behalf of Montenegrins, and Čejović provided 60,000 Dinars which, at that time, was a considerable amount, to select and properly prepare the Cetinje subassociation team to present as highest quality football possible. The selected players gathered at April 25 in Tivat, where the three week preparations began. Tivat was a logical choice, as it was then the only pitch with proper dimensions and had all other commodities such as showers.

At the beginning, 27 players were selected, including members of Cetinje teams Sloga and Crnogorac, Podgorica teams Balšić and Crna Gora, Arsenal from Tivat, Jugosloven from Kotor, Leotar from Trebinje and Hercegovac from Bileća. Accused by authorities of gathering youth with communist ideals, players from Budućnost and Lovćen were ignored. The first games of this team were preparation games against Dubrovnik and the combined team of Kotor and Tivat.

As typical, media was divided and there was skepticism. The journal "Zeta" wrote that the important thing was not to be humiliated, especially because the game meant so much for all Montenegrins from the homeland, as much as for the many living in Belgrade. Meantime, media from Belgrade, such as Pravda, were calling the attention to the fact that football in the provinces as Montenegro had improved substantially and had been worth much more attention for some time.

On the day of the game, the stadium was full since the morning and included extravagances such as groups of cyclists which came from Skopje on their bikes in three days. At 15:00, in front of 30,000 spectators, the Montenegrin team entered the field. It was formed of Ikontije Nakić, Vlado Božović, Vlado Mugoša, Vojo Mugoša, Asim Đurđević, (Jovan?) Kruška, Rogović, Jovićević, Klemen, Arsić and Karlo Marks. The ticket for just the Montenegrins vs Belgrade game was 100 Dinars. When the game started, the general impression was that they played with a lot of sacrifice and gambled risking good technical skills; however, at the end, the result was a 2–6 defeat. But the general impression was good, as potential was seen. As a comfort, they could watch the Yugoslavia vs England game, which Yugoslavia won 2–1.

== Attendances ==
The average attendance per top-flight football league season and the club with the highest average attendance is:

Season	League average	Best club	Best club average
2023-24	436	Budućnost Podgorica	1,047

== See also ==
- Montenegro national football team
- Montenegrin Football Championship (1922–1940)
- Montenegrin clubs in Yugoslav football competitions (1946–2006)
- Football Association of Montenegro
