= RFC Arsenal Tivat =

Montenegrin rugby union club, based in Tivat

Rugby Football Club Arsenal Tivat
- Nickname: Arsenal
- Founded: 2011; 15 years ago
- Location: Tivat, Montenegro
- Ground(s): Stadion u parku, Tivat (Capacity: 500)
- President: Igor Adžaip
- League: Jadran League
- 1: 3rd
Team kit

Rugby Football Club Arsenal Tivat is a Montenegrin rugby club based in Tivat.

== Honours ==
=== Domestic competitions ===
- Montenegro Rugby Championship

Winners (1): 2013/14

- Montenegro Rugby Sevens Championship

Winners (2): 2013, 2014

== Current squad ==
The provisional Arsenal Tivat Rugby Squad for the season is:

Arsenal Tivat Rugby Squad
**Props**: Milić Femić; Redžo Baljaj; Srđa Smolović; **Hookers**: **Janko Milović**; **Locks**: Aleksandar Vojinović; Petar Božinović	**Loose forwards**: **Igor Adžaip**; **Bojan Miždalo**; Đorđije Premović; Darko Đuričić; **Scrum-halves**: **Nikola Jovanović**; Vedran Čortan; **Fly-halves**: **Srđan Popović (c)**; Peđa Baroš	**Centres**: **Aljoša Markinović**; Jovan Kontić; Nenad Srđić; Danilo Raičković; **Wingers**: Milos Dašić; Lazar Adžić; Dragomir Ljubisavljević; Edi Ibishaj; **Fullbacks**: Milan Aleksić; Sammy Morina
(c) Denotes team captain, **Bold** denotes player is internationally capped
