= Ragbi klub Nikšić =

Montenegrin rugby union club, based in Nikšić

- Nickname: Lavovi (Lions)
- Founded: 2013; 13 years ago
- Location: Nikšić, Montenegro
- Ground: Glava Zete venue (Capacity: 100(seated))
- President: Dimitrije Cvorovic
- Coach: Miodrag Jovic
- League: Montenegrin national division
Team kit

Ragbi klub Nikšić is a Montenegrin rugby union club based in Nikšić. It is the third youngest club in Montenegro. The first session was held on "Trebjesa" field on September 15, 2013. Since then, the club operates regularly on a semi-pro level. The biggest achievement of this young club is the third place that was won at international memorial tournament "Luka Marin" Novi Sad. Nowadays, the club is competing in Montenegrin national league which consists of 5 clubs (Arsenal, Buducnost, Niksic, Lovcen and Mornar).

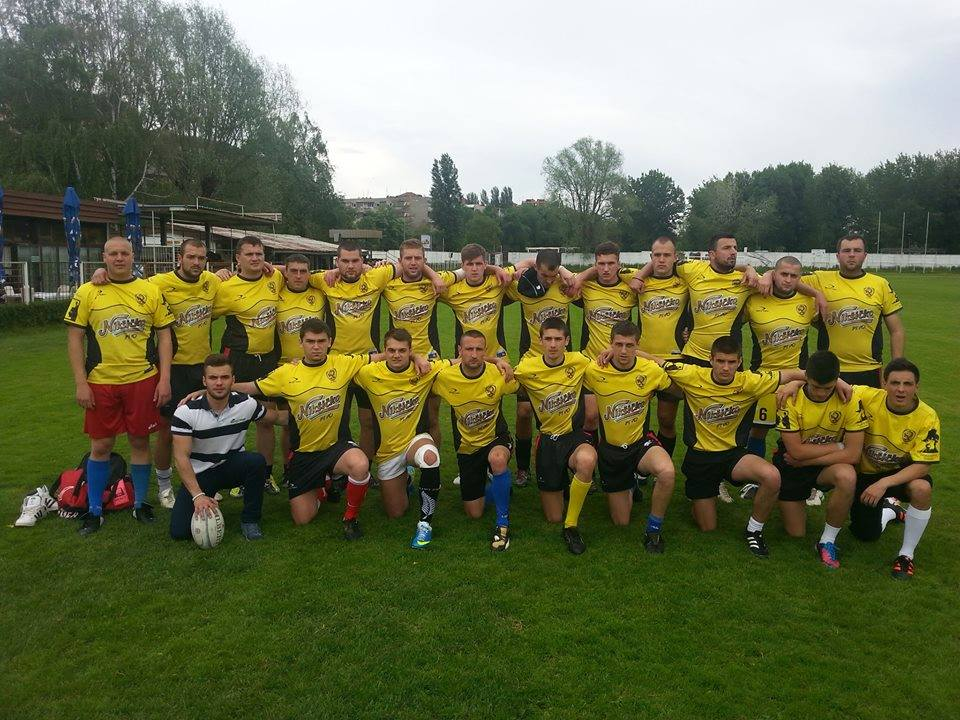
Rk Niksic squad at the Luka Marin Novi Sad tournament

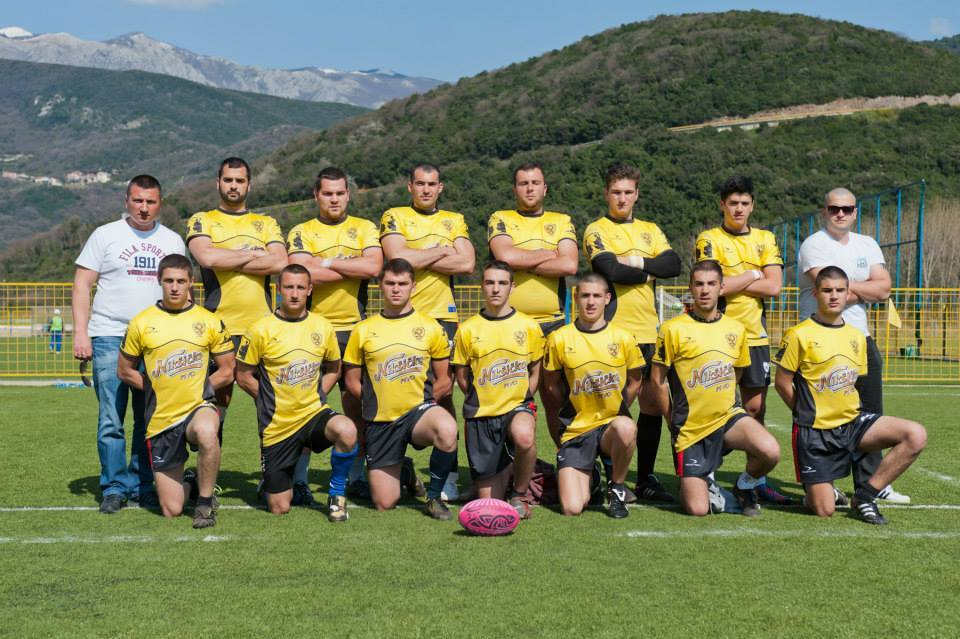
Rk Niksic 7s team

== Current squad ==
The provisional Nikšić Rugby Squad for the season is:

Nikšić Rugby Squad
**Props**: **Dusko Stanković**; **Ivan Perović**; **Milan Radović**; **Hookers**: **Dimitrije Dida Cvorović**; **Locks**: **Nikola Vuletić**; Boban Kankaras; Boris Mišović	**Loose forwards**: **Nemanja Štojanovski**; **Boris Mijušković (c)**; **Aleksandar Roganović**; Bozidar Jovanović; Mirko Damjanović; **Scrum-halves**: Petar Dojcinović; Alan Hadrović; **Novica Raonić**; **Fly-halves**: **Milos Kuvelja**	**Centres**: **Danilo Adžić**; **Marko Hadzi-Novakovic**; Ivan Abramović; Ivan Nikcević; **Wingers**: Bosko Perović; Flip Luković; **Fullbacks**: **Boško Bota Mirjačić**
(c) Denotes team captain, **Bold** denotes player is internationally capped
