= 2011–12 Montenegrin Cup =

Tournament details
- Country: Montenegro
- Teams: 30

Final positions
- Champions: Čelik (1st title)
- Runners-up: Rudar

Tournament statistics
- Matches played: 43
- Goals scored: 111 (2.58 per match)
- Top goal scorer: Ivica Jovanović (5 goals)

The 2011–12 Montenegrin Cup was the sixth season of the Montenegrin knockout football tournament. The winner of the tournament received a berth in the first qualifying round of the 2012–13 UEFA Europa League. The defending champions were Rudar, who beat Mogren in the final of the 2010–11 competition. The competition featured 30 teams. It started on 24 August 2011 and ended with the final on 23 May 2012.

== First round ==
The 14 matches were played on 24 August 2011, with the exception of the Blue Star vs Čelik match, which was played the next day.

=== Summary ===
Team 1	Score	Team 2
Jedinstvo	2–0	Dečić
Polimlje	1–2	Zeta
Mornar	4–2	Berane
Petrovac	2–0	Iskra
Ibar	0–2	Mladost
Zabjelo	0–2	Sutjeska
Drezga	1–3	Lovćen
Otrant	0–4	Bokelj
Igalo	2–2 (2–4 p)	Grbalj
Kom	0–3	Budućnost
Arsenal	2–1	Petnjica
Brskovo	1–0	Bar
Blue Star	0–2	Čelik
Bratstvo	3–1	Jezero
Rudar	bye	
Mogren	bye	

=== Matches ===
24 August 2011	Jedinstvo	2–0	Dečić	Bijelo Polje
17:00 CEST	Jovović 5'; Boričić 18'			Stadium: Gradski stadion Referee: Predrag Radovanović

24 August 2011	Polimlje	1–2	Zeta	Murino
17:00 CEST	Milović 73'		Burzanović 13'; Orlandić 86'	Stadium: Stadion u Murinu; Referee: Darko Kovačević

24 August 2011	Mornar	4–2	Berane	Bar
17:00 CEST	Lukateli 8'; Merdović 12'; Kujović 44'; Paljokić 90'		Peličić 18'; Grdinić 60'	Stadium: Stadion Topolica; Referee: Dragan Mijušković

24 August 2011	Petrovac	2–0	Iskra	Petrovac
17:00 CEST	Zvicer 9'; N. Jovanović 31'			Stadium: Stadion pod Malim brdom Referee: Miloš Savović

24 August 2011	Ibar	0–2	Mladost	Rožaje
17:00 CEST			Rolović 30'; Krkeljić 49'	Stadium: Stadion Bandžovo Brdo; Referee: Dražen Petrić

24 August 2011	Zabjelo	0–2	Sutjeska	Podgorica
17:00 CEST			Krivokapić 54'; M. Nikolić 79'	Stadium: Zabjelo Stadium; Referee: Radoje Pajović

24 August 2011	Drezga	1–3	Lovćen	Piperi
17:00 CEST	Krivokapić 50'		Vujović 14', 49'; Banović 26'	Stadium: Drezga Stadium; Referee: Vojin Vojinović

24 August 2011	Otrant	0–4	Bokelj	Ulcinj
17:00 CEST			Pavićević 31', 73'; Petković 43'; Kaluđerović 90'	Stadium: Stadion Olympic; Referee: Tomica Bulatović

24 August 2011	Igalo	2–2 (2–4 p)	Grbalj	Igalo
17:00 CEST	Kovačević 19'; Vučković 78'		Milić 58'; Mićić 75'	Stadium: Stadion Solila; Referee: Milovan Milačić

24 August 2011	Kom	0–3	Budućnost	Podgorica
17:00 CEST			Radonjić 4'; Kalezić 9'; Nikač 56'	Stadium: Stadion Zlatica; Referee: Luka Rovčanin

24 August 2011	Arsenal	2–1	Petnjica	Tivat
17:00 CEST	Bjedov 21'; Fatović 88'		Deletić 17'	Stadium: Stadion u parku Referee: Nikola Vođević

24 August 2011	Brskovo	1–0	Bar	Mojkovac
17:00 CEST	Janketić 83'			Stadium: Gradski stadion Referee: Miraš Cerović

24 August 2011	Bratstvo	3–1	Jezero	Ljajkovići
17:00 CEST	Spasojević 2', 28', 49'		Radončić 24'	Stadium: Stadion Ljajkovići; Referee: Darko Gašić

25 August 2011	Blue Star	0–2	Čelik	Podgorica
17:00 CEST			Vujačić 64'; Bojić 71' (pen.)	Stadium: Stadion Zlatica; Referee: Oskar Huter

== Second round ==
The 14 winners from the first round and last year's cup finalists, Rudar and Mogren, compete in this round. Starting with this round, all rounds of the competition will be two-legged except for the final. The first legs were held on 14 September 2011, while the second legs were held on 28 September 2011.

=== Summary ===
Team 1	Agg.	Team 2	1st leg	2nd leg
Sutjeska	2–3	Zeta	2–0	0–3
Rudar	4–2	Grbalj	1–1	3–1
Jedinstvo	7–1	Arsenal	3–0	4–1
Petrovac	2–0	Brskovo	0–0	2–0
Lovćen	0–2	Čelik	0–1	0–1
Mogren	4–0	Mornar	2–0	2–0
Bokelj	3–2	Budućnost	3–0	0–2
Mladost	5–4	Bratstvo	2–0	3–4

=== First legs ===
14 September 2011	Sutjeska	2–0	Zeta	Nikšić
16:30 CEST	Marković 30' (pen.); Radulović 83' (o.g.)			Stadium: Gradski stadion Referee: Predrag Radovanović

14 September 2011	Rudar	1–1	Grbalj	Pljevlja
16:30 CEST	Stojanović 22' (pen.)		Novaković 69'	Stadium: Gradski stadion Referee: Milovan Milačić

14 September 2011	Jedinstvo	3–0	Arsenal	Bijelo Polje
16:30 CEST	Čindrak 10'; S. Jovanović 17'; Fetahović 86'			Stadium: Gradski stadion Referee: Luka Rovčanin

14 September 2011	Petrovac	0–0	Brskovo	Petrovac
16:30 CEST				Stadium: Stadion pod Malim brdom Referee: Vojin Vojinović

14 September 2011	Lovćen	0–1	Čelik	Cetinje
16:30 CEST			Ćuzović 54'	Stadium: Stadion Obilića poljana Referee: Mileta Šćepanović

14 September 2011	Mogren	2–0	Mornar	Budva
16:30 CEST	Ćulafić 10'; Bakić 70'			Stadium: Stadion Lugovi

14 September 2011	Bokelj	3–0	Budućnost	Kotor
16:30 CEST	Todorović 40'; Bakoč 43'; Kaluđerović 69'			Stadium: Stadion pod Vrmcem; Referee: Dragan Mijušković

14 September 2011	Mladost	2–0	Bratstvo	Podgorica
16:30 CEST	Rolović 40'; Merdović 52'			Stadium: Mladost Stadium; Referee: Miloš Savović

=== Second legs ===
28 September 2011	Zeta	3–0 (3–2 agg.)	Sutjeska	Golubovci
15:00 CEST	Korać 1'; Kalačević 2'; Božović 90'			Stadium: Stadion Trešnjica; Referee: Savo Vujović

28 September 2011	Grbalj	1–3 (2–4 agg.)	Rudar	Radanovići
15:00 CEST	Nikolić 84'		I. Jovanović 30'; Stojanović 46' (pen.); Rustemović 63'	Stadium: Stadion Donja Sutvara; Referee: Darko Gašić

28 September 2011	Arsenal	1–4 (1–7 agg.)	Jedinstvo	Tivat
15:00 CEST	Radojičić 42'		S. Jovanović 25'; Kasapi 27'; Vuković 30'; Čindrak 36'	Stadium: Stadion u Parku; Referee: Milovan Milačić

28 September 2011	Brskovo	0–2 (0–2 agg.)	Petrovac	Mojkovac
15:00 CEST			Muhović 22', 44'	Stadium: Gradski stadion Referee: Saša Rašović

28 September 2011	Čelik	1–0 (2–0 agg.)	Lovćen	Nikšić
15:00 CEST	Bojić 30' (pen.)			Stadium: Stadion Željezare; Referee: Darko Kovačević

28 September 2011	Mornar	0–2 (0–4 agg.)	Mogren	Bar
15:00 CEST			R. Zec 12'; Ranđelović 77'	Stadium: Stadion Topolica; Referee: Vladan Kojović

28 September 2011	Budućnost	2–0 (2–3 agg.)	Bokelj	Podgorica
15:00 CEST	Đikanović 17'; Bošković 81' (pen.)			Stadium: Podgorica City Stadium; Referee: Pavle Radovanović

28 September 2011	Bratstvo	4–3 (4–5 agg.)	Mladost	Ljajkovići
15:00 CEST	Popović 44' (pen.); Spasojević 45', 80'; Bulatović 85'		Vučić 23'; Čabarkapa 35'; Rolović 59'	Stadium: Stadion Ljajkovići; Referee: Predrag Radovanović

== Quarter-finals ==
The eight winners from the second round competed in this round. The first legs took place on 19 October 2011 and the second legs took place on 2 November 2011.

=== Summary ===
Team 1	Agg.	Team 2	1st leg	2nd leg
Mogren	1–4	Rudar	1–4	0–0
Jedinstvo	3–2	Zeta	1–0	2–2
Bokelj	1–2	Čelik	0–1	1–1
Petrovac	3–1	Mladost	0–0	3–1

=== First legs ===
19 October 2011	Mogren	1–4	Rudar	Budva
14:30 CEST	Ranđelović 40'	Report	Stojanović 3'; I. Jovanović 17', 90'; Ig. Ivanović 63'	Stadium: Stadion Lugovi; Attendance: 800; Referee: Jovan Kaluđerović

19 October 2011	Jedinstvo	1–0	Zeta	Pljevlja
14:30 CEST	Kasumović 45'	Report		Stadium: Gradski stadion Attendance: 300; Referee: Miloš Bošković

19 October 2011	Bokelj	0–1	Čelik	Kotor
14:30 CEST		Report	Bojić 80' (pen.)	Stadium: Stadion pod Vrmcem; Attendance: 500; Referee: Nikola Dabanović

19 October 2011	Petrovac	0–0	Mladost	Petrovac
14:30 CEST		Report		Stadium: Stadion pod Malim brdom Attendance: 200; Referee: Željko Radunović

=== Second legs ===
2 November 2011	Rudar	0–0 (4–1 agg.)	Mogren	Pljevlja
13:30 CET		Report		Stadium: Gradski stadion Attendance: 500; Referee: Jovan Kaluđerović

2 November 2011	Zeta	2–2 (2–3 agg.)	Jedinstvo	Golubovci
13:30 CET	Korać 58', 88'	Report	Kasapi 74' (pen.); Kasumović 86'	Stadium: Stadion Trešnjica; Attendance: 400; Referee: Nikola Dabanović

2 November 2011	Čelik	1–1 (2–1 agg.)	Bokelj	Nikšić
13:30 CET	Brnović 65'	Report	Junčaj 79'	Stadium: Stadion Željezare; Attendance: 800; Referee: Predrag Radovanović

2 November 2011	Mladost	1–3 (1–3 agg.)	Petrovac	Podgorica
13:30 CET	Tomić 29'	Report	N. Jovanović 42'; Zvicer 57'; Živković 70'	Stadium: Mladost Stadium; Attendance: 400; Referee: Saša Rašović

== Semi-finals ==
The four winners from the quarter-finals competed in this round. These matches took place on 28 March and 25 April 2012.

=== Summary ===
Team 1	Agg.	Team 2	1st leg	2nd leg
Jedinstvo	1–3	Čelik	1–0	0–3
Rudar	3–1	Petrovac	2–0	1–1

=== First legs ===
28 March 2012	Jedinstvo	1–0	Čelik	Bijelo Polje
15:00 CEST	Stajić 76'	Report		Stadium: Gradski stadion Attendance: 2,500; Referee: Nikola Dabanović

28 March 2012	Rudar	2–0	Petrovac	Pljevlja
15:00 CEST	I. Jovanović 69' (pen.); Stojanović 71'	Report		Stadium: Gradski stadion Attendance: 1,500; Referee: Jovan Kaluđerović

=== Second legs ===
25 April 2012	Čelik	3–0 (3–1 agg.)	Jedinstvo	Nikšić
16:00 CEST	Zorić 15'; Iv. Ivanović 65'; Kasapi 82'	Report		Stadium: Stadion Željezare; Attendance: 4,500; Referee: Jovan Kaluđerović

25 April 2012	Petrovac	1–1 (1–3 agg.)	Rudar	Petrovac
16:00 CEST	Čarapić 90+3'	Report	Igumanović 35'	Stadium: Stadion pod Malim brdom Attendance: 200; Referee: Aleksandar Marković

== Final ==
23 May 2012
20:15 CEST

Čelik	2–1	Rudar
Dubljević 10'; Bojić 35'		I. Jovanović 46'

Podgorica City Stadium, Podgorica
Attendance: 7,000
Referee: Željko Radunović
