= 2010–11 Montenegrin Cup =

Tournament details
- Country: Montenegro
- Teams: 30

Final positions
- Champions: Rudar (3rd title)
- Runners-up: Mogren

Tournament statistics
- Matches played: 43
- Goals scored: 100 (2.33 per match)
- Top goal scorer(s): Darko Nikač; Stefan Mugoša (4 goals each)

The 2010–11 Montenegrin Cup was the fifth season of the Montenegrin knockout football tournament. The winner of the tournament received a berth in the second qualifying round of the 2011–12 UEFA Europa League. The defending champions were Rudar, who beat Budućnost in the final of the 2009–10 competition. The competition featured 30 teams. It started on 15 September 2010 and ended with the final on 25 May 2011.

== First round ==
The 14 matches were played on 15 September 2010, with the exception of the match between Kom and Petrovac match, which was postponed until 22 September 2010.

=== Summary ===
Team 1	Score	Team 2
Sutjeska	7–0	Otrant
Petnjica	0–2	Mornar
Mogren	3–0	Jedinstvo
Gornja Zeta	1–1 (9–8 p)	Grbalj
Ibar	1–5	Zeta
Kom	0–0 (8–9 p)	Petrovac
Mladost	3–1	Bratstvo
Bokelj	0–0 (2–0 p)	Lovćen
Arsenal	0–1	Bar
Polimlje	0–5	Dečić
Berane	2–2 (3–4 p)	Pljevlja
Zabjelo	0–2	Iskra
Crvena Stijena	0–0 (7–6 p)	Čelik
Cetinje	0–2	Jezero
Rudar	bye	
Budućnost	bye	

=== Matches ===
14 September 2010	Petnjica	0–2	Mornar	Berane
16:30 CEST			Peričić 57'; D. Nenezić 88'	Stadium: Gradski stadion Referee: Miloš Nedić

15 September 2010	Sutjeska	7–0	Otrant	Nikšić
16:30 CEST	Durutović 16'; Marković 24', 25'; Pejović 35'; Bulatović 42', 74'; Zvicer 79'			Stadium: Gradski stadion Referee: Miloš Savović

15 September 2010	Mogren	3–0	Jedinstvo	Budva
16:30 CEST	Madžar 25', 32', 35'			Stadium: Stadion Lugovi; Referee: Luka Rovčanin

15 September 2010	Gornja Zeta	1–1 (8–7 p)	Grbalj	Ljajkovići
16:30 CEST	Ajković 23'		I. Bošković 55'	Stadium: Stadion Ljajkovići; Referee: Dragan Borozan

15 September 2010	Ibar	1–5	Zeta	Rožaje
16:30 CEST	Ličina 45'		Korać 16', 25'; Lambulić 54'; Došljak 68'; Dabić 90'	Stadium: Stadion Bandžovo Brdo; Referee: Amil Gerina

15 September 2010	Mladost	3–1	Bratstvo	Podgorica
16:30 CEST	Đurišić 49'; Čabarkapa 52'; Kladnik 78'		Orlandić 81'	Stadium: Mladost Stadium; Referee: Dragan Mijušković

15 September 2010	Bokelj	0–0 (2–0 p)	Lovćen	Kotor
16:30 CEST				Stadium: Stadion pod Vrmcem; Referee: Saša Rašović

15 September 2010	Arsenal	0–1	Bar	Tivat
16:30 CEST			Čindrak 83'	Stadium: Stadion u Parku; Referee: Željko Mićović

15 September 2010	Polimlje	0–5	Dečić	Murino
16:30 CEST			E. Đoković 8', 53'; Jasavić 35', 60'; Lekić 55'	Stadium: Stadion u Murinu; Referee: Dražen Petrić

15 September 2010	Berane	2–2 (3–4 p)	Pljevlja	Berane
16:30 CEST	Huremović 35'; M. Raičević 71'		Mrdak 30', 81'	Stadium: Gradski stadion Referee: Miloš Bošković

15 September 2010	Zabjelo	0–2	Iskra	Podgorica
16:30 CEST			Alković 59'; Šaletić 76' (pen.)	Stadium: Zabjelo Stadium; Referee: Mileta Šćepanović

15 September 2010	Crvena Stijena	0–0 (7–6 p)	Čelik	Podgorica
16:30 CEST				Stadium: Tološi Stadium; Referee: Darko Kovačević

15 September 2010	Cetinje	0–2	Jezero	Cetinje
16:30 CEST			Ćosović 67'; Janketić 88'	Stadium: Stadion Obilića poljana Referee: Darko Gašić

22 September 2010	Kom	0–0 (8–9 p)	Petrovac	Podgorica
16:00 CEST				Stadium: Stadion Zlatica; Referee: Milovan Milačić

== Bracket ==
Round of 16
1	Bar	1	1	2
16	Mornar	0	1	1
8	Bokelj	0	0	0
9	Mogren	3	1	4
5	Gornja Zeta	0	0	0
12	Budućnost	4	6	10
4	Petrovac	3	2	5
13	Jezero	0	0	0
6	Rudar	2	2	4
11	Crvena Stijena	0	1	1
3	Iskra	1	0	1
14	Sutjeska	2	2	4
7	Mladost	0	1	1
10	Dečić	0	2	2
2	Zeta	1	3	4
15	Pljevlja	0	0	0

Quarter-finals
Bar	1	1	2
Mogren	1	2	3
Budućnost	0	0	0
Petrovac	0	2	2
Rudar	0	2	2
Sutjeska	0	1	1
Dečić	0	0	0
Zeta	0	2	2

Semi-finals
Mogren	2	2	4
Petrovac	0	0	0
Rudar	1	2	3
Zeta	0	2	2

Final
Mogren	2 (4)
Rudar (pen)	2 (5)

== Second round ==
The 14 winners from the First Round and last year's cup finalists, Rudar and Budućnost, compete in this round. Starting with this round, all rounds of the competition will be two-legged except for the final. The first legs were held on October 20, 2010, while the second legs were held on November 3, 2010.

=== Summary ===
Team 1	Agg.	Team 2	1st leg	2nd leg
Rudar	4–2	Crvena Stijena	2–0	2–1
Iskra	1–4	Sutjeska	1–2	0–2
Zeta	4–0	Pljevlja	1–0	3–0
Petrovac	5–0	Jezero	3–0	2–0
Gornja Zeta	0–10	Budućnost	0–4	0–6
Bokelj	0–4	Mogren	0–3	0–1
Bar	2–1	Mornar	1–0	1–1
Mladost	1–2	Dečić	0–0	1–2

=== First legs ===
20 October 2010	Rudar	2–0	Crvena Stijena	Pljevlja
15:00 CEST	Bečić 58' (o.g.); I. Jovanović 80'			Stadium: Gradski stadion Referee: Aleksandar Marković

20 October 2010	Iskra	1–2	Sutjeska	Nikšić
15:00 CEST	Savić 9'		Marković 49'; Bulajić 88'	Stadium: Stadion Željezare; Referee: Dragan Borozan

20 October 2010	Zeta	1–0	Pljevlja	Golubovci
15:00 CEST	Boljević 37'			Stadium: Stadion Trešnjica; Referee: Miloš Savović

20 October 2010	Petrovac	3–0	Jezero	Petrovac
15:00 CEST	Ljumić 1', 16'; Novović 60'			Stadium: Stadion pod Malim brdom Referee: Luka Rovčanin

20 October 2010	Gornja Zeta	0–4	Budućnost	Ljajkovići
15:00 CEST			P. Vukčević 11'; S. Mugoša 33'; Nikač 48'; Golubović 73'	Stadium: Stadion Ljajkovići; Referee: Dragan Mijušković

20 October 2010	Bokelj	0–3	Mogren	Kotor
15:00 CEST			Đokaj 17'; Nerić 48'; Ćulafić 53'	Stadium: Stadion pod Vrmcem; Referee: Vojin Vojinović

20 October 2010	Bar	1–0	Mornar	Bar
15:00 CEST	Čindrak 43'			Stadium: Stadion Topolica; Referee: Vladan Kojović

20 October 2010	Mladost	0–0	Dečić	Podgorica
15:00 CEST				Stadium: Mladost Stadium; Referee: Amil Gerina

=== Second legs ===
3 November 2010	Crvena Stijena	1–2 (2–4 agg.)	Rudar	Podgorica
14:00 CET	Popović 53'		Mrdak 18'; Karadžić 36'	Stadium: Tološi Stadium; Referee: Miloš Bošković

3 November 2010	Sutjeska	2–0 (4–1 agg.)	Iskra	Nikšić
14:00 CET	Burić 37' (o.g.); Zorić 70'			Stadium: Gradski stadion Referee: Amil Gerina

3 November 2010	Pljevlja	0–3 (0–4 agg.)	Zeta	Pljevlja
14:00 CET			Radulović 45', 54'; Dabić 83'	Stadium: Gradski stadion Referee: Vladan Kojović

3 November 2010	Jezero	0–2 (0–5 agg.)	Petrovac	Plav
14:00 CET			Čarapić 11'; Raičević 87'	Stadium: Stadion Pod Racinom; Referee: Saša Rašović

3 November 2010	Budućnost	6–0 (10–0 agg.)	Gornja Zeta	Podgorica
14:00 CET	S. Mugoša 5', 7', 29'; Nikač 22', 33', 40'			Stadium: Podgorica City Stadium; Referee: Dragan Borozan

3 November 2010	Mogren	1–0 (4–0 agg.)	Bokelj	Budva
14:00 CET	Grbić 80' (pen.)			Stadium: Stadion Lugovi; Referee: Miloš Savović

3 November 2010	Mornar	1–1 (2–1 agg.)	Bar	Bar
14:00 CET	Ceklić 37' (o.g.)		Živković 89'	Stadium: Stadion Topolica; Referee: Željko Mićović

3 November 2010	Dečić	2–1 (2–1 agg.)	Mladost	Tuzi
14:00 CET	E. Lekić 70', 81'		Seratlić 23'	Stadium: Stadion Tuško Polje; Referee: Darko Gašić

== Quarter-finals ==
The eight winners from the Second Round will compete in this round. The first legs took place on 24 November 2010 and the second legs took place on 8 December 2010.

=== Summary ===
Team 1	Agg.	Team 2	1st leg	2nd leg
Rudar	2–1	Sutjeska	0–0	2–1
Budućnost	0–2	Petrovac	0–0	0–2
Dečić	0–2	Zeta	0–0	0–2
Bar	2–3	Mogren	1–1	1–2

=== First legs ===
24 November 2010	Rudar	0–0	Sutjeska	Pljevlja
13:00 CET		Report		Stadium: Gradski stadion Attendance: 300; Referee: Vladan Kojović

24 November 2010	Budućnost	0–0	Petrovac	Podgorica
13:00 CET		Report		Stadium: Podgorica City Stadium; Attendance: 100; Referee: Željko Mićović

24 November 2010	Bar	1–1	Mogren	Podgorica
13:00 CET	Vuković 89' (pen.)	Report	G. Jovanović 24'	Stadium: Camp FSCG; Attendance: 50; Referee: Amil Gerina

1 December 2010	Dečić	0–0	Zeta	Podgorica
13:00 CET		Report		Stadium: Camp FSCG; Attendance: 100; Referee: Predrag Radovanović

=== Second legs ===
8 December 2010	Petrovac	2–0 (2–0 agg.)	Budućnost	Radanovići
13:00 CET	Cicmil 16' (pen.); Rotković 28'	Report		Stadium: Stadion Donja Sutvara; Attendance: 100; Referee: Aleksandar Marković

8 December 2010	Zeta	2–0 (2–0 agg.)	Dečić	Podgorica
13:00 CET	Došljak 1'; Burzanović 19'	Report		Stadium: Mladost Stadium; Attendance: 400; Referee: Nikola Dabanović

8 December 2010	Mogren	2–1 (3–2 agg.)	Bar	Podgorica
13:00 CET	Batak 16'; Nerić 43'	Report	Jovančov 45'	Stadium: Camp FSCG; Attendance: 100; Referee: Ranko Spasojević

9 December 2010	Sutjeska	1–2 (2–3 agg.)	Rudar	Nikšić
13:00 CET	Kasalica 51' (pen.)	Report	Bojić 32' (pen.); Mićić 56'	Stadium: Gradski stadion Attendance: 800; Referee: Jovan Kaluđerović

== Semi-finals ==
The four winners from the Quarter-finals will compete in this round. These matches took place on 13 and 27 April 2011.

=== Summary ===
Team 1	Agg.	Team 2	1st leg	2nd leg
Rudar	3–2	Zeta	1–0	2–2
Mogren	4–0	Petrovac	2–0	2–0

=== First legs ===
13 April 2011	Mogren	2–0	Petrovac	Budva
16:00 CEST	Ćetković 51'; Matić 60'	Report		Stadium: Stadion Lugovi; Attendance: 200; Referee: Jovan Kaluđerović

20 April 2011	Rudar	1–0	Zeta	Pljevlja
16:00 CEST	Mićić 65'	Report		Stadium: Gradski stadion Attendance: 1,200; Referee: Nikola Dabanović

=== Second legs ===
27 April 2011	Zeta	2–2 (2–3 agg.)	Rudar	Golubovci
16:00 CEST	Škuletić 72'; Lađić 88'	Report	I. Jovanović 11'; Popović 15'	Stadium: Stadion Trešnjica; Attendance: 500; Referee: Jovan Kaluđerović

27 April 2011	Petrovac	0–2 (0–4 agg.)	Mogren	Petrovac
16:30 CEST		Report	Bakić 39', 85'	Stadium: Stadion pod Malim brdom Attendance: 300; Referee: Aleksandar Marković

== Final ==
The two winners from the Semifinals competed in a single-legged final, held on 25 May 2011.

25 May 2011
20:15 CEST

Mogren	2–2 (a.e.t.)	Rudar
Đokaj 15' (pen.); Ćetković 112'		Vlahović 53'; Bojić 97' (pen.)
Penalties
Batak (penalty scored); Ćetković (penalty scored); Božović (penalty scored); Matić (penalty missed); Đokaj (penalty scored)	4–5	(penalty scored) Igumanović; (penalty scored) Vlahović; (penalty scored) Francišković; (penalty scored) Bojić; (penalty scored) I. Jovanović

Podgorica City Stadium, Podgorica
Attendance: 5,000
Referee: Ranko Spasojević
