= 2015–16 Montenegrin Cup =

Tournament details
- Country: Montenegro
- Teams: 29

Final positions
- Champions: Rudar (4th title)
- Runners-up: Budućnost

Tournament statistics
- Matches played: 42
- Goals scored: 117 (2.79 per match)
- Top goal scorer(s): Igor Lambulić; Miloš Đalac; Ivan Knežević (4 goals each)

The 2015–16 Montenegrin Cup was the 10th season of the Montenegrin knockout football tournament. The winner of the tournament received a berth in the first qualifying round of the 2016–17 UEFA Europa League. The defending champions were Mladost, who beat Petrovac in the final of the last competition. The competition featured 30 teams. It started on 16 September 2015 and ended with the final on 2 June 2016.

== First round ==
Thirteen first round matches were played on 15 and 16 September 2015.

=== Summary ===
Team 1	Score	Team 2
Bratstvo	0–3	Sutjeska
Rudar	1–0	Radnički
Petnjica	0–3	Bokelj
Zora	0–1	Dečić
Cetinje	1–2	Lovćen
Grafičar	1–4	Grbalj
Budućnost	5–0	Berane
Zeta	3–1	Igalo
Kom	1–2	Iskra
Brskovo	2–1	Jezero
Hajduk	1–2	Jedinstvo
Sloga Bar	0–1	Mladost Lješkopolje
Fair Play	0–7	Mornar
Ibar	bye	
Mladost	bye	
Petrovac	bye	

=== Matches ===
15 September 2015	Sloga Bar	0–1	Mladost Lješkopolje	Bar
15:30 CEST		Report	Bojanović 18'	Stadium: Stadion Topolica; Attendance: 50; Referee: Dalibor Vujisić

16 September 2015	Grafičar	1–4	Grbalj	Tuzi
15:30 CEST	Vratnica 15'	Report	Kopitović 34'; Pavlović 44'; Čolaković 54'; Milojko 76' (pen.)	Stadium: Stadion Tuško Polje; Attendance: 50; Referee: Nikola Vođević

16 September 2015	Zora	0–1	Dečić	Spuž
15:30 CEST		Report	Lambulić 2'	Stadium: Gradski stadion Attendance: 70; Referee: Savo Vujović

16 September 2015	Bratstvo	0–3	Sutjeska	Ljajkovići
15:30 CEST		Report	Bulajić 32'; Zarubica 37', 51'	Stadium: Stadion Ljajkovići; Attendance: 200; Referee: Željko Radunović

16 September 2015	Brskovo	2–1	Jezero	Mojkovac
15:30 CEST	Radulović 30'; Minić 90'	Report	Čekić 30' (pen.)	Stadium: Gradski stadion Attendance: 300; Referee: Aleksandar Marković

16 September 2015	Zeta	3–1	Igalo	Golubovci
15:30 CEST	Cvetanović 7'; Vlaisavljević 52'; Bilialov 66'	Report	Karadžić 21'	Stadium: Stadion Trešnjica; Attendance: 100; Referee: Dražen Petrić

16 September 2015	Budućnost	5–0	Berane	Podgorica
15:30 CEST	Ilinčić 1'; Radunović 15'; Vušurović 35'; Raspopović 44'; Hočko 55'	Report		Stadium: Podgorica City Stadium; Attendance: 250; Referee: Miloš Bošković

16 September 2015	Kom	1–2	Iskra	Podgorica
15:30 CEST	Bulatović 59'	Report	Pavićević 16'; Obagbemiro 78'	Stadium: Stadion Zlatica; Attendance: 200; Referee: Miraš Cerović

16 September 2015	Petnjica	0–3	Bokelj	Petnjica
15:30 CEST		Report	Pržica 19', 40', 69'	Stadium: Stadion Gusare; Attendance: 350; Referee: Aleksandar Šćekić

16 September 2015	Cetinje	1–2	Lovćen	Cetinje
15:30 CEST	Radunović 90+2'	Report	Rogošić 34'; Perutović 52'	Stadium: Stadion Obilića poljana Attendance: 450; Referee: Vladan Kojović

16 September 2015	Rudar	1–0	Radnički	Pljevlja
15:30 CEST	Božović 47'	Report		Stadium: Gradski stadion Attendance: 300; Referee: Vojin Vojinović

16 September 2015	Hajduk	1–2	Jedinstvo	Bar
15:30 CEST	Miranović 63'	Report	Krstović 14' (pen.), 28'	Stadium: Stadion Topolica; Attendance: 20; Referee: Miloš Laličić

16 September 2015	Fair Play	0–7	Mornar	Bijelo Polje
15:30 CEST		Report	Leverda 7', 86'; Kalezić 35', 82'; Vujačić 70', 87'; Bogdanović 72'	Stadium: Gradski stadion Attendance: 100; Referee: Miloš Nedić

== Second round ==
Sixteen clubs competed in the second round played over two legs on 23 September and 21 October 2015.

=== Summary ===
Team 1	Agg.	Team 2	1st leg	2nd leg
Ibar	1–7	Dečić	0–2	1–5
Lovćen	5–3	Mladost Lješkopolje	3–0	2–3
Petrovac	1–2	Mornar	0–1	1–1
Zeta	4–2	Brskovo	3–0	1–2
Rudar	4–0	Sutjeska	1–0	3–0
Mladost	2–0	Jedinstvo	2–0	0–0
Grbalj	1–6	Budućnost	1–2	0–4
Bokelj	4–2	Iskra	3–0	1–2

=== First legs ===
23 September 2015	Ibar	0–2	Dečić	Rožaje
15:30 CEST		Report	Lambulić 8'; Camaj 51' (pen.)	Stadium: Stadion Bandžovo Brdo; Attendance: 500; Referee: Nikola Vođević

23 September 2015	Lovćen	3–0	Mladost Lješkopolje	Cetinje
15:30 CEST	Jablan 13'; Đalac 23', 27'	Report		Stadium: Stadion Obilića poljana Attendance: 300; Referee: Miloš Nedić

23 September 2015	Petrovac	0–1	Mornar	Petrovac
15:30 CEST		Report	Leverda 59'	Stadium: Stadion pod Malim brdom Attendance: 150; Referee: Savo Vujović

23 September 2015	Zeta	3–0	Brskovo	Golubovci
15:30 CEST	Bjedov 36'; Vlaisavljević 44', 45+2'	Report		Stadium: Stadion Trešnjica; Attendance: 100; Referee: Vojin Vojinović

23 September 2015	Rudar	1–0	Sutjeska	Pljevlja
15:30 CEST	Knežević 89'	Report		Stadium: Gradski stadion Attendance: 500; Referee: Vladan Kojović

23 September 2015	Mladost	2–0	Jedinstvo	Podgorica
15:30 CEST	Novović 45'; Pejović 62' (pen.)	Report		Stadium: Mladost Stadium; Attendance: 200; Referee: Radoje Pajović

23 September 2015	Grbalj	1–2	Budućnost	Radanovići
15:30 CEST	Raičević 68'	Report	Ilinčić 25'; Radunović 34' (pen.)	Stadium: Stadion Donja Sutvara; Attendance: 100; Referee: Željko Radunović

23 September 2015	Bokelj	3–0	Iskra	Kotor
15:30 CEST	Kotorac 42'; Pepić 45'; Šćekić 49'	Report		Stadium: Stadion pod Vrmcem; Attendance: 250; Referee: Dražen Petrić

=== Second legs ===
21 October 2015	Dečić	5–1 (7–1 agg.)	Ibar	Tuzi
13:30 CEST	Lambulić 12' (pen.), 54'; Pepić 21'; Krkanović 24'; Vulaj 61'	Report	Murić 78' (pen.)	Stadium: Stadion Tuško polje Attendance: 250; Referee: Vojin Vojinović

21 October 2015	Mladost Lješkopolje	3–2 (3–5 agg.)	Lovćen	Podgorica
13:30 CEST	Ćetković 56'; Radoman 67', 70'	Report	Jablan 11'; Vujović 75'	Stadium: Stari Ribnjak Stadium; Attendance: 50; Referee: Miraš Cerović

21 October 2015	Mornar	1–1 (2–1 agg.)	Petrovac	Bar
13:30 CEST	Vučinić 6'	Report	Joboshi 66'	Stadium: Stadion Topolica; Attendance: 150; Referee: Miloš Novović

21 October 2015	Brskovo	2–1 (2–4 agg.)	Zeta	Mojkovac
13:30 CEST	Vidaković 15'; Arimitsu 42'	Report	Klikovac 41'	Stadium: Gradski stadion Attendance: 150; Referee: Dražen Petrić

21 October 2015	Jedinstvo	0–0 (0–2 agg.)	Mladost	Bijelo Polje
13:30 CEST		Report		Stadium: Gradski stadion Attendance: 300; Referee: Vladan Kojović

21 October 2015	Sutjeska	0–3 (0–4 agg.)	Rudar	Nikšić
13:30 CEST		Report	I. Marković 11', 58'; Božović 76'	Stadium: Gradski stadion Attendance: 300; Referee: Aleksandar Marković

21 October 2015	Budućnost	4–0 (6–1 agg.)	Grbalj	Podgorica
13:30 CEST	Burzanović 14', 47'; Ilinčić 47'; Drobnjak 73'	Report		Stadium: Podgorica City Stadium; Attendance: 200; Referee: Nikola Vođević

21 October 2015	Iskra	2–1 (2–4 agg.)	Bokelj	Podgorica
13:30 CEST	Stanovčić 79'; Pavićević 90'	Report	Pajović 39'	Stadium: Stadion Zlatica; Attendance: 250; Referee: Dragan Mijušković

== Quarter-finals ==
Eight clubs competed in the quarter-finals played over two legs on 4, 25 November and 2 December 2015.

=== Summary ===
Team 1	Agg.	Team 2	1st leg	2nd leg
Mladost	1–4	Bokelj	0–2	1–2
Lovćen	6–1	Mornar	3–1	3–0
Dečić	3–4	Rudar	2–2	1–2
Budućnost	2–0	Zeta	2–0	0–0

=== First legs ===
4 November 2015	Dečić	2–2	Rudar	Golubovci
13:30 CET	Pepić 89'; Lulgjuraj 90+3'	Report	Vlahović 51'; Knežević 78'	Stadium: Stadion Trešnjica; Attendance: 300; Referee: Dragan Mijušković

4 November 2015	Lovćen	3–1	Mornar	Cetinje
13:30 CET	Vojvodić 4' (o.g.); Đalac 24'; Flávio 35'	Report	Kim 21'	Stadium: Stadion Obilića poljana Attendance: 300; Referee: Nikola Vođević

4 November 2015	Budućnost	2–0	Zeta	Podgorica
13:30 CET	Burzanović 61'; Hočko 82'	Report		Stadium: Podgorica City Stadium; Attendance: 500; Referee: Mileta Šćepanović

4 November 2015	Mladost	0–2	Bokelj	Podgorica
13:30 CET		Report	Mladenović 31'; Pepić 90'	Stadium: Mladost Stadium; Attendance: 200; Referee: Jovan Kaluđerović

=== Second legs ===
25 November 2015	Rudar	2–1 (4–3 agg.)	Dečić	Pljevlja
13:00 CET	Knežević 59', 73'	Report	Adžović 70'	Stadium: Gradski stadion Attendance: 300; Referee: Pavle Radovanović

25 November 2015	Mornar	0–3 (1–6 agg.)	Lovćen	Bar
13:00 CET		Report	Đalac 20'; Jablan 29'; Rogošić 77'	Stadium: Stadion Topolica; Attendance: 150; Referee: Predrag Radovanović

25 November 2015	Zeta	0–0 (0–2 agg.)	Budućnost	Golubovci
13:00 CET		Report		Stadium: Stadion Trešnjica; Referee: Miloš Savović

2 December 2015	Bokelj	2–1 (4–1 agg.)	Mladost	Kotor
13:00 CET	Nikezić 6'; Pepić 40'	Report	Golubović 90'	Stadium: Stadion pod Vrmcem; Attendance: 300; Referee: Jovan Kaluđerović

== Semi-finals ==
Four clubs competed in the semi-finals played over two legs on 13 and 27 April 2016.

=== Summary ===
Team 1	Agg.	Team 2	1st leg	2nd leg
Budućnost	3–1	Lovćen	2–0	1–1
Bokelj	0–3	Rudar	0–1	0–2

=== First legs ===
13 April 2016	Bokelj	0–1	Rudar	Kotor
16:00 CEST		Report	Božović 38'	Stadium: Stadion pod Vrmcem; Attendance: 600; Referee: Miloš Novović

13 April 2016	Budućnost	2–0	Lovćen	Podgorica
18:00 CEST	Pejaković 64'; Mirković 86'	Report		Stadium: Podgorica City Stadium; Attendance: 1,000; Referee: Miloš Savović

=== Second legs ===
27 April 2016	Rudar	2–0 (3–0 agg.)	Bokelj	Pljevlja
16:30 CEST	I. Marković 21'; Ivanović 25'	Report		Stadium: Gradski stadion Attendance: 300; Referee: Miloš Bošković

27 April 2016	Lovćen	1–1 (1–3 agg.)	Budućnost	Cetinje
16:30 CEST	Ž. Marković 5'	Report	Đalović 58' (pen.)	Stadium: Stadion Obilića poljana Attendance: 250; Referee: Miloš Novović

== Final ==
2 June 2016
20:30 CEST

Budućnost	0–0	Rudar
	Report
Penalties
Đalović (penalty scored); Raspopović (penalty scored); Mirković (penalty scored); Raičković (penalty missed); Vušurović (penalty missed)	3–4	(penalty scored) Božović; (penalty scored) Vlahović; (penalty missed) Alić; (penalty scored) I. Marković; (penalty scored) Radanović

Podgorica City Stadium, Podgorica
Attendance: 6,000
Referee: Miloš Novović
