= 2014–15 Montenegrin Cup =

Tournament details
- Country: Montenegro
- Teams: 30

Final positions
- Champions: Mladost (1st title)
- Runners-up: Petrovac

Tournament statistics
- Matches played: 43
- Goals scored: 117 (2.72 per match)
- Top goal scorer: Petar Orlandić (6 goals)

The 2014–15 Montenegrin Cup was the ninth season of the Montenegrin knockout football tournament. The winner of the tournament received a berth in the first qualifying round of the 2015–16 UEFA Europa League. The defending champions were Lovćen, who beat Mladost in the final of the last competition. The competition featured 30 teams. It started on 24 September 2014 and ended with the final on 20 May 2015.

== First round ==
The 14 matches in this round will be played on 24 and 25 September 2014.

=== Summary ===
Team 1	Score	Team 2
Čelik	0–1	Petrovac
Cetinje	1–3	Zeta
Ibar	3–0	Bokelj
Rudar	5–0	Jedinstvo
Jezero	1–2	Budućnost
Polimlje	0–2	Grbalj
Sutjeska	2–0	Iskra
Sloga Radovići	0–1	Berane
Hajduk	0–2	Mornar
Kom	1–4	Mogren
Bratstvo	2–0	Radnički
Igalo	3–1	Arsenal
Zabjelo	2–4	Dečić
Grafičar	0–1	Pljevlja
Lovćen	bye	
Mladost	bye	

=== Matches ===
24 September 2014	Čelik	0–1	Petrovac	Nikšić
15:00 CEST		Report	Leposavić 90+3'	Stadium: Pomoćni teren FK Sutjeska; Attendance: 200; Referee: Miraš Cerović

24 September 2014	Cetinje	1–3	Zeta	Cetinje
15:00 CEST	Radunović 13'	Report	Dujković 7'; Orlandić 68'; Burzanović 83'	Stadium: Stadion Obilića poljana Attendance: 200; Referee: Dragan Mijušković

24 September 2014	Ibar	3–0	Bokelj	Rožaje
15:00 CEST	Košuta 62'; Molabećirović 80'; Tahirović 90+3'	Report		Stadium: Stadion Bandžovo Brdo; Attendance: 150; Referee: Savo Vujović

24 September 2014	Rudar	5–0	Jedinstvo	Pljevlja
15:00 CEST	Brnović 35'; Gačević 58'; Mrdak 64'; Golubović 73'; Atanasov 85'	Report		Stadium: Gradski stadion Attendance: 300; Referee: Vladan Kojović

24 September 2014	Jezero	1–2	Budućnost	Plav
15:00 CEST	Radončić 6'	Report	Hočko 3'; Pavićević 49'	Stadium: Stadion Pod Racinom; Attendance: 350; Referee: Aleksandar Marković

24 September 2014	Polimlje	0–2	Grbalj	Murino
15:00 CEST		Report	Pepić 15'; Kočanović 48' (o.g.)	Stadium: Stadion u Murinu; Attendance: 100; Referee: Dražen Petrić

24 September 2014	Sutjeska	2–0	Iskra	Nikšić
15:00 CEST	Pejović 20' (pen.), 90+2'	Report		Stadium: Gradski stadion Attendance: 300; Referee: Radoje Pajović

24 September 2014	Sloga Radovići	0–1	Berane	Radovići
15:00 CEST		Report	Efović 61'	Stadium: Stadion Krtoli; Attendance: 100; Referee: Boban Živaljević

24 September 2014	Hajduk	0–2	Mornar	Bar
15:00 CEST		Report	B. Božović 2'; Rotković 21'	Stadium: Stadion Topolica; Attendance: 150; Referee: Miloš Bošković

24 September 2014	Kom	1–4	Mogren	Podgorica
15:00 CEST	Kljajević 65'	Report	V. Vujačić 41'; Zec 44'; Karadžić 51'; Bakić 90'	Stadium: Stadion Zlatica; Attendance: 200; Referee: Predrag Radovanović

24 September 2014	Bratstvo	2–0	Radnički	Ljajkovići
15:00 CEST	Gazivoda 68'; Stanisavić 75' (pen.)	Report		Stadium: Stadion Ljajkovići; Attendance: 50; Referee: Miloš Savović

24 September 2014	Igalo	3–1	Arsenal	Igalo
15:00 CEST	Perović 5'; Yamamoto 63'; Kažić 83' (pen.)	Report	S. Vujović 69'	Stadium: Stadion Solila; Attendance: 100; Referee: Miloš Bešović

24 September 2014	Zabjelo	2–4	Dečić	Podgorica
15:00 CEST	Lutovac 13'; Papić 32'	Report	Gardašević 9', 17'; Ramović 68'; Camaj 79'	Stadium: Zabjelo Stadium; Referee: Đorđije Ćalić

25 September 2014	Grafičar	0–1	Pljevlja	Podgorica
15:00 CEST		Report	Matanović 43'	Stadium: Zabjelo Stadium; Attendance: 100; Referee: Miloš Adamović

== Second round ==
The 14 winners from the First Round and last year's cup finalists, Lovćen and Mladost, compete in this round. Starting with this round, all rounds of the competition will be two-legged except for the final. The first legs were held on 1 October 2014, while the second legs were held on 22 October 2014.

=== Summary ===
Team 1	Agg.	Team 2	1st leg	2nd leg
Mornar	6−2	Bratstvo	3−2	3−0
Zeta	9−1	Dečić	6−0	3−1
Grbalj	5−2	Igalo	2−0	3−2
Lovćen	1−0	Rudar	0−0	1−0
Mogren	3−6	Mladost	1−5	2−1
Berane	3−4	Sutjeska	3−2	0−2
Pljevlja	0−13	Budućnost	0−4	0−9
Ibar	1−3	Petrovac	1−1	0−2

=== First legs ===
1 October 2014	Mornar	3–2	Bratstvo	Bar
15:00 CEST	Kalezić 49'; Rotković 56', 65'	Report	Stanisavić 66'; Gazivoda 79'	Stadium: Stadion Topolica; Attendance: 200; Referee: Vladan Kojović

1 October 2014	Zeta	6–0	Dečić	Golubovci
15:00 CEST	Orlandić 22', 44', 45', 69'; Mihailović 59'; Kukuličić 61'	Report		Stadium: Stadion Trešnjica; Attendance: 250; Referee: Vladimir Bjelica

1 October 2014	Grbalj	2–0	Igalo	Radanovići
15:00 CEST	Pavlović 36'; Vukčević 62'	Report		Stadium: Stadion Donja Sutvara; Attendance: 150; Referee: Nikola Vođević

1 October 2014	Lovćen	0–0	Rudar	Cetinje
15:00 CEST		Report		Stadium: Stadion Obilića poljana Attendance: 450; Referee: Miloš Savović

1 October 2014	Mogren	1–5	Mladost	Budva
15:00 CEST	Zvicer 87'	Report	Jovanović 10'; Savićević 20'; Knežević 40', 57', 77'	Stadium: Stadion Lugovi; Attendance: 150; Referee: Dragan Mijušković

1 October 2014	Berane	3–2	Sutjeska	Berane
15:00 CEST	Nerić 20', 41'; Toyoshima 63'	Report	Ognjanović 23'; Jovović 72'	Stadium: Gradski stadion Attendance: 1,200; Referee: Miraš Cerović

1 October 2014	Pljevlja	0–4	Budućnost	Pljevlja
15:00 CEST		Report	Raičković 29'; Čelebić 31'; A. Vujačić 58'; Drobnjak 80'	Stadium: Gradski stadion Attendance: 750; Referee: Predrag Radovanović

1 October 2014	Ibar	1–1	Petrovac	Rožaje
15:00 CEST	Molabećirović 36'	Report	Kopitović 80'	Stadium: Stadion Bandžovo Brdo; Attendance: 600; Referee: Aleksandar Marković

=== Second legs ===
22 October 2014	Bratstvo	0–3 (2–6 agg.)	Mornar	Ljajkovići
14:00 CEST		Report	Rotković 2' (pen.), 45'; Mrvaljević 72'	Stadium: Stadion Ljajkovići; Attendance: 20; Referee: Nikola Vođević

22 October 2014	Dečić	1–3 (1–9 agg.)	Zeta	Tuzi
14:00 CEST	Gardašević 73'	Report	Orlandić 19'; Popović 36'; Trifković 39'	Stadium: Stadion Tuško Polje; Attendance: 30; Referee: Dalibor Vujisić

22 October 2014	Igalo	2–3 (2–5 agg.)	Grbalj	Igalo
14:00 CEST	Đorđević 73'; Kažić 88'	Report	Janković 19', 83'; Nikač 51'	Stadium: Stadion Solila; Attendance: 50; Referee: Željko Radunović

22 October 2014	Rudar	0–1 (0–1 agg.)	Lovćen	Pljevlja
14:00 CEST		Report	D. Božović 21'	Stadium: Gradski stadion Referee: Miloš Savović

22 October 2014	Mladost	1–2 (6–3 agg.)	Mogren	Podgorica
14:00 CEST	Karadžić 65'	Report	Mugoša 78'; Grbović 87'	Stadium: Mladost Stadium; Attendance: 100; Referee: Miloš Nedić

22 October 2014	Sutjeska	2–0 (4–3 agg.)	Berane	Nikšić
14:00 CEST	Ognjanović 42'; Kovačević 66'	Report		Stadium: Gradski stadion Referee: Dražen Petrić

22 October 2014	Budućnost	9–0 (13–0 agg.)	Pljevlja	Podgorica
14:00 CEST	Raičević 25'; Milošević 28', 72', 80'; Ilinčić 32', 45', 86'; Bakrač 38'; Drobnjak 84'	Report		Stadium: Podgorica City Stadium; Attendance: 200; Referee: Marko Ivanović

22 October 2014	Petrovac	2–0 (3–1 agg.)	Ibar	Bar
14:00 CEST	Pejaković 7'; Ivanović 76'	Report		Stadium: Stadion Topolica; Attendance: 50; Referee: Vojin Vojinović

== Quarter-finals ==
The eight winners from the Second Round competed in this round. The first legs took place on 5 November 2014 and the second legs took place on 26 November 2014.

=== Summary ===
Team 1	Agg.	Team 2	1st leg	2nd leg
Grbalj	0−1	Budućnost	0−0	0−1
Zeta	0−0 (3−4 p)	Mladost	0−0	0−0
Petrovac	2−1	Lovćen	1−0	1−1
Sutjeska	3−2	Mornar	3−0	0−2

=== First legs ===
5 November 2014	Grbalj	0–0	Budućnost	Radanovići
13:00 CET		Report		Stadium: Stadion Donja Sutvara; Attendance: 200; Referee: Mileta Šćepanović

5 November 2014	Petrovac	1–0	Lovćen	Petrovac
13:00 CET	Kacić 55'	Report		Stadium: Stadion pod Malim brdom Attendance: 250; Referee: Miloš Savović

5 November 2014	Zeta	0–0	Mladost	Golubovci
13:00 CET		Report		Stadium: Stadion Trešnjica; Attendance: 300; Referee: Pavle Radovanović

5 November 2014	Sutjeska	3–0	Mornar	Nikšić
13:00 CET	Lukić 59'; G. Vujović 78'; Igumanović 90'	Report		Stadium: Gradski stadion Referee: Vojin Vojinović

=== Second legs ===
26 November 2014	Lovćen	1–1 (1–2 agg.)	Petrovac	Cetinje
13:00 CET	D. Božović 24'	Report	Pejaković 68'	Stadium: Stadion Obilića poljana Attendance: 250; Referee: Mileta Šćepanović

26 November 2014	Mladost	0–0 (0–0 agg.) (4–3 p)	Zeta	Podgorica
13:00 CET		Report		Stadium: Mladost Stadium; Attendance: 800; Referee: Pavle Radovanović

26 November 2014	Mladost	2–0 (4–3 agg.)	Sutjeska	Bar
13:00 CET	Jovančov 68'; B. Božović 75'	Report		Stadium: Stadion Topolica; Attendance: 150; Referee: Radoje Pajović

26 November 2014	Budućnost	1–0 (1–0 agg.)	Grbalj	Podgorica
15:30 CET	Pavićević 47'	Report		Stadium: Podgorica City Stadium; Attendance: 300; Referee: Miloš Novović

== Semi-finals ==
The four winners from the quarter-finals competed in this round. The first legs took place on 8 April 2014 and the second legs took place on 22 April 2015.

=== Summary ===
Team 1	Agg.	Team 2	1st leg	2nd leg
Petrovac	1–0	Budućnost	0–0	1–0
Sutjeska	0–4	Mladost	0–2	0–2

=== First legs ===
8 April 2015	Sutjeska	0–2	Mladost	Nikšić
15:30 CEST		Report	Šćepanović 24'; Đurišić 75'	Stadium: Gradski stadion Attendance: 800; Referee: Predrag Radovanović

8 April 2015	Petrovac	0–0	Budućnost	Petrovac
19:00 CEST		Report		Stadium: Stadion pod Malim brdom Attendance: 400; Referee: Miloš Novović

=== Second legs ===
22 April 2015	Budućnost	0–1 (0–1 agg.)	Petrovac	Podgorica
15:00 CEST		Report	Kacić 43'	Stadium: Podgorica City Stadium; Attendance: 1,000; Referee: Pavle Radovanović

22 April 2015	Mladost	2–0 (4–0 agg.)	Sutjeska	Podgorica
15:00 CEST	Šćepanović 26'; Đurišić 86'	Report		Stadium: Mladost Stadium; Attendance: 400; Referee: Aleksandar Marković

== Final ==
20 May 2015
20:30 CEST

Petrovac	1–2 (a.e.t.)	Mladost
Knežević 27'		Šćepanović 19'; Marković 106' (o.g.)

Podgorica City Stadium, Podgorica
Attendance: 5,000
Referee: Miloš Savović
