= Dubljević =

Dubljević (Montenegrin: Дубљевић) is a Montenegrin surname. Notable people with this surname include:

- Aleksandar Dubljević (born 1985), Montenegrin soccer player.
- Bojan Dubljević (born 1991), Montenegrin basketball player.
- Jelena Dubljević (born 1987), Montenegrin female basketball player.
