= Kasapi =

Kasapi is a surname. Notable people with the surname include:

- Fetim Kasapi (born 1983), Albanian footballer
- Shpat Kasapi (1985–2025), Albanian singer and songwriter
- Vasiliki Kasapi (born 1983), Greek weightlifter

== See also ==
- Kasapis (surname)
