= Kasapis =

Kasapis is a surname. Notable people with the surname include:

- Gus Kasapis (born 1942), Canadian football player
- Michalis Kasapis (born 1971), Greek footballer
- Theodoros Kasapis (1835–1897), Ottoman Greek newspaper editor and educator

== See also ==
- Kasapi (surname)
