= Saša Jovanović =

Saša Jovanović may refer to:

- Saša Jovanović (footballer, born 1974), Serbian association football manager, and former player
- Saša Jovanović (footballer, born 1988), Serbian association football player
- Saša Jovanović (footballer, born 1991), Serbian association football player who plays for TSC
- Saša Jovanović (footballer, born 1993), Serbian association football player who plays for Radnički Niš
