= 2011–12 Montenegrin First League =

Montenegrin First League
- Season: 2011–12
- Dates: 6 August 2011 – 30 May 2012
- Champions: Budućnost; 2nd title
- Relegated: Bokelj; Berane; Dečić
- Champions League: Budućnost
- Europa League: Rudar; Zeta; Čelik (via cup)
- Matches: 198
- Goals: 497 (2.51 per match)
- Top goalscorer: Admir Adrović (22 goals)
- Biggest home win: Budućnost 6–0 Mladost (5 May 2012)
- Biggest away win: Bokelj 0–5 Mogren (26 May 2012)
- Highest scoring: Rudar 6–2 Bokelj (30 May 2012)
- Longest winning run: 10 games Budućnost
- Longest unbeaten run: 21 games Rudar
- Longest losing run: 12 games Bokelj; Sutjeska

The 2011–12 Montenegrin First League was the sixth season of the top-tier football in Montenegro. The season began on 6 August 2011 and ended on 30 May 2012, with a winter break beginning on 8 December 2011. Mogren are the defending champions.

== Teams ==
Bar were directly relegated to the Montenegrin Second League after finishing 12th at the end of last season; the club returned to the second level after just one year. Their place was taken by 2010–11 Second League champions Bokelj, who returned to the top league of Montenegro after an absence of three seasons.

10th-placed Mornar and 11th-placed Sutjeska had to compete in two-legged relegation play-offs. Sutjeska kept their place in the First League by beating Second League runners-up Jedinstvo Bijelo Polje 1–0 on aggregate. On the other hand, Mornar were relegated after losing to Second League third-placed team FK Berane on away goals; the two-leg affair ended 1–1. Berane thus made their immediate return to the league, while Mornar were relegated after two seasons in the top flight.

=== Stadia and locations ===
Location of the 2010–11 Montenegrin First League teams

Team	City	Stadium	Capacity	Coach
Berane	Berane	Gradski Stadion Berane	9,000	(Montenegro) Slobodan Đukić
Bokelj	Kotor	Stadion pod Vrmcem	3,000	(Montenegro) Slobodan Drašković
Budućnost	Podgorica	Stadion Pod Goricom	12,000	(Montenegro) Miodrag Radulović
Dečić	Tuzi	Stadion Tuško Polje	1,000	(Montenegro) Božidar Vuković
Grbalj	Radanovići	Stadion Donja Sutvara	1,000	(Montenegro) Aleksandar Nedović
Lovćen	Cetinje	Stadion Obilića Poljana	1,000	(Montenegro) Radovan Kavaja
Mladost	Podgorica	Stadion Cvijetni Brijeg	1,000	(Montenegro) Miodrag Vukotić
Mogren	Budva	Stadion Lugovi	2,000	(Montenegro) Branislav Milačić
Petrovac	Petrovac	Stadion Pod Malim Brdom	1,000	(Montenegro) Milorad Malovrazić
Rudar	Pljevlja	Gradski stadion Pljevlja	7,000	(Montenegro) Dragan Radojičić
Sutjeska	Nikšić	Stadion kraj Bistrice	11,000	(Montenegro) Saša Petrović
Zeta	Golubovci	Stadion Trešnjica	4,000	(Montenegro) Rade Vešović

== League table ==
Pos	Team	Pld	W	D	L	GF	GA	GD	Pts	Qualification or relegation
1	Budućnost (C)	33	25	5	3	82	27	+55	80	Qualification for the Champions League second qualifying round
2	Rudar	33	23	8	2	60	20	+40	77	Qualification for the Europa League first qualifying round
3	Zeta	33	17	9	7	55	40	+15	60	Qualification for the Europa League first qualifying round
4	Mogren	33	15	9	9	54	37	+17	54	
5	Petrovac	33	13	9	11	36	39	−3	48	
6	Lovćen	33	10	10	13	34	42	−8	40	
7	Mladost	33	10	7	16	32	45	−13	37	
8	Sutjeska	33	9	9	15	29	36	−7	36	
9	Grbalj	33	9	7	17	28	49	−21	34	
10	Dečić (R)	33	10	4	19	34	51	−17	34	Qualification for the relegation play-offs
11	Berane (Note: Berane was deducted one point due to not appearing in the game of the 18th round, against Dečić.) (R)	33	8	5	20	32	54	−22	28	Qualification for the relegation play-offs
12	Bokelj (R)	33	5	6	22	21	57	−36	21	Relegation to the Second League

Source: Soccerway
Rules for classification: 1) Points; 2) Head-to-head points; 3) Head-to-head goal difference; 4) Head-to-head goals scored; 5) Head-to-head away goals scored; 6) Goal difference; 7) Goals scored; 8) Draw.
The winners of the 2011–12 Montenegrin Cup, FK Čelik Nikšić (playing in the Second League), was also qualified for the first qualifying round of the UEFA Europa League.
(C) Champions; (R) Relegated

== Results ==
The schedule consisted of three rounds. During the first two rounds, each team played each other once home and away for a total of 22 matches. The pairings of the third round were then set according to the standings after the first two rounds, giving every team a third game against each opponent for a total of 33 games per team.

=== First and second round ===
Home \ Away	BER	BOK	BUD	DEČ	GRB	LOV	MLA	MOG	PET	RUD	SUT	ZET
Berane		1–0	0–1	2–0	1–3	2–1	0–1	2–4	2–2	0–0	1–1	2–3
Bokelj	2–0		0–1	1–3	1–0	1–1	0–3	0–3	0–0	1–2	0–2	2–1
Budućnost	3–1	1–1		5–0	3–1	4–0	3–1	1–2	5–1	0–2	2–0	5–0
Dečić	3–0 (Note: The match between Dečić and Berane was not played, because the Berane was suspended due to unsettled obligations, it was registered with the official result for Dečić.)	0–1	1–3		3–1	3–0	1–0	1–1	2–3	1–2	1–0	1–3
Grbalj	1–0	2–1	1–3	2–0		0–0	1–2	1–1	0–3	0–1	2–0	0–1
Lovćen	1–1	2–1	0–2	0–0	0–0		0–2	0–1	0–2	1–3	2–0	0–0
Mladost	0–2	1–0	0–1	1–0	2–0	2–2		1–1	0–1	0–2	2–2	0–4
Mogren	2–0	2–1	1–2	5–1	0–1	2–0	1–1		1–1	1–1	2–1	2–2
Petrovac	2–1	2–0	1–1	1–0	2–1	3–2	0–0	1–2		0–2	0–0	1–2
Rudar	1–0	4–1	2–2	1–0	3–0	1–1	3–0	2–0	2–1		0–0	1–0
Sutjeska	0–1	1–0	2–3	1–2	0–3	0–0	0–0	0–0	2–0	0–1		0–1
Zeta	2–3	1–1	0–2	1–0	0–0	3–0	2–1	0–0	1–0	4–1	0–0	

Source: Football Association of Montenegro (in Montenegrin)
Legend: Blue = home team win; Yellow = draw; Red = away team win.

=== Third round ===
Key numbers for pairing determination (number marks position after 22 games):

Rounds
23rd	24th	25th	26th	27th	28th	29th	30th	31st	32nd	33rd
1 – 12; 2 – 11; 3 – 10; 4 – 9; 5 – 8; 6 – 7	1 – 2; 8 – 6; 9 – 5; 10 – 4; 11 – 3; 12 – 7	2 – 12; 3 – 1; 4 – 11; 5 – 10; 6 – 9; 7 – 8	1 – 4; 2 – 3; 9 – 7; 10 – 6; 11 – 5; 12 – 8	3 – 12; 4 – 2; 5 – 1; 6 – 11; 7 – 10; 8 – 9	1 – 6; 2 – 5; 3 – 4; 10 – 8; 11 – 7; 12 – 9	4 – 12; 5 – 3; 6 – 2; 7 – 1; 8 – 11; 9 – 10	1 – 8; 2 – 7; 3 – 6; 4 – 5; 11 – 9; 12 – 10	5 – 12; 6 – 4; 7 – 3; 8 – 2; 9 – 1; 10 – 11	1 – 10; 2 – 9; 3 – 8; 4 – 7; 5 – 6; 12 – 11	6 – 12; 7 – 5; 8 – 4; 9 – 3; 10 – 2; 11 – 1

Home \ Away	BER	BOK	BUD	DEČ	GRB	LOV	MLA	MOG	PET	RUD	SUT	ZET
Berane			0–1		1–1			1–3	1–2		2–0	
Bokelj	0–1		1–2		1–1			0–5	0–1			
Budućnost				3–1		0–3 (Note: The match between Budućnost and Lovćen was interrupted in the 92nd minute with the score 0–1 for away team due to the intrusion of the home fans on the field. It was later registered with the official result for Lovćen.)	6–0			1–1	3–0	2–2
Dečić	1–0	1–0					2–0			0–0		2–2
Grbalj			0–4	2–1				1–0	1–1		0–4	
Lovćen	2–0	1–1		3–1	2–0						1–0	
Mladost	4–1	2–0			4–1	1–3				0–1		0–0
Mogren			1–3	3–0		1–2	2–1				1–2	2–3
Petrovac			1–4	1–3		1–0	1–0	0–1			1–1	
Rudar	3–1	6–2			1–0	1–2		4–1	0–0			
Sutjeska		2–0		2–0			2–0			0–3		4–2
Zeta	4–2	3–0			3–1	3–2			2–0	0–3		

Source: Football Association of Montenegro (in Montenegrin)
Legend: Blue = home team win; Yellow = draw; Red = away team win.

== Relegation play-offs ==
The 10th-placed team (against the 3rd-placed team of the Second League) and the 11th-placed team (against the runners-up of the Second League) will both compete in two-legged relegation play-offs after the end of the season.

=== Summary ===
Team 1	Agg.	Team 2	1st leg	2nd leg
Dečić	0–2	Jedinstvo	0–0	0–2
Berane	1–5	Mornar	1–2	0–3

=== Matches ===
3 June 2012
17:30 CEST

Dečić	0–0	Jedinstvo
	Report (page 37)

Stadion Tuško Polje, Tuzi
Attendance: 1,500
Referee: Željko Radunović
7 June 2012
17:30 CEST

Jedinstvo	2–0	Dečić
Gojačanin 21', 42'	Report (page 37)

Gradski stadion, Bijelo Polje
Attendance: 3,500
Referee: Nikola Dabanović

Jedinstvo won 2–0 on aggregate.

3 June 2012
17:30 CEST

Berane	1–2	Mornar
Tomović 7'	Report (page 37)	Jovović 10'; Vojvodić 68'

Gradski stadion, Berane
Attendance: 2,000
Referee: Mileta Šćepanović
7 June 2012
17:30 CEST

Mornar	3–0	Berane
Metović 8', 26'; Jovančov 33'	Report (page 37)

Stadion Topolica, Bar
Attendance: 3,000
Referee: Aleksandar Marković

Mornar won 5–1 on aggregate.

== Top scorers ==
Rank	Scorer	Club	Goals
1	(Montenegro) Admir Adrović	Budućnost	22
2	(Montenegro) Žarko Korać	Zeta	21
3	(Serbia) Ivica Jovanović	Rudar	18
4	(Montenegro) Dragan Bošković	Budućnost	17
5	(Montenegro) Srđan Radonjić	Budućnost	14
5	(Montenegro) Nikola Vujović	Mogren	14
7	(Montenegro) Nenad Jovanović	Petrovac	12
8	(Montenegro) Luka Đorđević	Mogren	10
8	(Serbia) Đorđe Šušnjar	Sutjeska	10
10	(Montenegro) Igor Ivanović	Rudar	9
10	(Montenegro) Božo Marković	Sutjeska	9
10	(Serbia) Nenad Stojanović	Rudar	9
