= Miodrag Radulović =

Montenegrin footballer and coach (born 1967)

- Radulović with Lebanon in 2024

Personal information
- Date of birth: 23 October 1967 (age 59)
- Place of birth: Titograd, Montenegro, Yugoslavia
- Position: Midfielder

Team information
- Current team: Al-Minaa (head coach)

Youth career
- 1980–1988: Budućnost Titograd

Senior career*
Years	Team	Apps	(Gls)
1988	Sutjeska Nikšić	2	(0)
1989–1991	Budućnost Titograd	17	(1)
1991–1993	Hajduk Kula	50	(10)
1994	Budućnost Titograd	7	(0)
1994–1995	Zemun	24	(3)
1995	Pierikos		
1996–1998	Budućnost Titograd	31	(0)

Managerial career
- 2001–2003: Zeta (assistant)
- 2003–2004: Borac Banja Luka (assistant)
- 2002–2004: Serbia and Montenegro U21 (assistant)
- 2004: Serbia and Montenegro Olympic (assistant)
- 2005–2006: Serbia and Montenegro U19
- 2006–2007: Boavista (assistant)
- 2010: Pakhtakor Tashkent
- 2010–2011: Dynamo Moscow (assistant)
- 2011–2012: Budućnost Podgorica
- 2012: Kazma
- 2013: Atyrau
- 2014–2015: Al Jahra
- 2015–2019: Lebanon
- 2019: Myanmar
- 2020: Zob Ahan
- 2020–2023: Montenegro
- 2024–2026: Lebanon
- 2026–: Al-Minaa
- * Club domestic league appearances and goals

Miodrag Radulović (Serbian Cyrillic: Миодраг Радуловић; born 23 October 1967) is a Montenegrin professional football manager and former player who is the head coach of Iraq Stars League club Al-Minaa.

== Playing career ==
Born in Titograd, Montenegro, his football career began in 1980 at Budućnost Titograd. He went on to play for Sutjeska Nikšić in the Yugoslav Second League in the first half of the 1988–89 season, and then moved to Budućnost Titograd during winter break and played with them in the Yugoslav First League till 1991. Then he played with Hajduk Kula, Zemun, Pierikos and Degerfors IF.

== Managerial career ==
=== Early career ===
He started his managerial career as an assistant to Nikola Rakojević at Zeta and Borac Banja Luka, and was an assistant to Željko Petrović at Portuguese side Boavista in 2006.

He also assisted Vladimir Petrović with the Serbia and Montenegro U21 team that qualified for the Olympic Games in Athens 2004. He then managed the Serbia and Montenegro U19 team from 2005 to 2006. He was also coach and scout for Montenegro national football team.

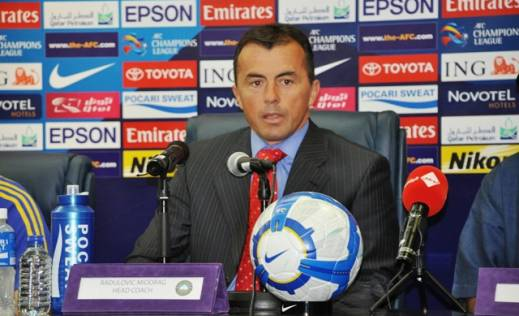
Miodrag Radulovic at a press conference for Pakhtakor Tashkent

He managed Uzbek League team FC Pakhtakor Tashkent from January to April 2010, finishing second in the league and qualifying for the Round of 16 of the 2010 AFC Champions League. On 3 May, almost a week before Pakhtakor's round of 16 clash with Al-Gharafa, he resigned, citing family reasons and that he was invited to work at a "European club with rich history and big ambitions by a close friend." That club turned out to be FC Dynamo Moscow. He was an assistant at Dynamo Moscow from April 2010 to April 2011.

In 2011, Radulović signed for Montenegrin First League club Budućnost Podgorica. He won the league in the 2011–2012 season with the most wins and the record number of points and goals in the league.

In June 2012, Radulović signed for Kuwaiti Premier League club Kazma.

=== Lebanon ===
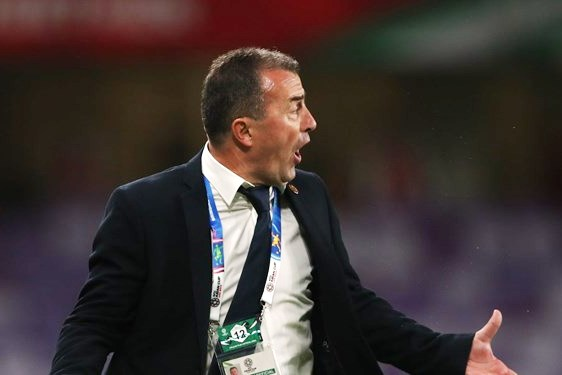
Radulović during the 2019 AFC Asian Cup group stage game against Qatar

He was appointed as new coach of Lebanon in 2015, following the departure of Italian manager Giuseppe Giannini. While he failed to qualify Lebanon to the 2018 FIFA World Cup, he successfully led them to their first ever AFC Asian Cup through qualification in 2019. Thus, he registered as the first Montenegrin to help a team qualify to a major tournament.

On 9 January 2019, Radulović coached Lebanon's first group stage game in the 2019 AFC Asian Cup against Qatar, losing 2–0. After the match, Radulović fell into a disagreement with Bassel Jradi and subsequently ruled him out of the national team for the rest of the tournament. In the second match, he lost once again against Saudi Arabia by the same score; he was fined between $5,000 and $7,000 by the AFC for protesting during the game. In the final game of the group stage Radulović led Lebanon to their 4–1 win against North Korea, their first in the competition's history. However, the three points were not enough as Lebanon were knocked out of the competition, losing out to Vietnam in the third-place ranking on the fairplay rule.

Radulović was also the supervisor for the Lebanon national under-23 team during the 2020 AFC U-23 Championship qualification. On 26 March 2019, the LFA announced that they would not renew his contract terminating on 1 May 2019 and that they would be looking to replace him with another foreign manager.

=== Myanmar ===
On 20 April 2019, Radulović was appointed by the Myanmar Football Federation (MFF) as new head coach for the Myanmar national team. According to the official announcement, the MFF gave Radulović and his assistant coach a contract valid until December 2020. The position as head coach of Myanmar had been vacant for four months, after the MFF parted ways with their former head coach Antoine Hey.

However, he was sacked in October 2019, only six months after being appointed. Radulović's debut versus Singapore was a success winning 1–2. Under Radulović, Myanmar's performance in the 2022 World Cup qualification was not as good as he expected from debut, with away losses to Mongolia and to Kyrgyzstan.

=== Zob Ahan ===
Radulović as Zob Ahan head coach in 2020

On 14 January 2020, Radulović was named coach of Iranian club Zob Ahan, signing a one-and-a-half-year deal. He would be reunited with goalkeeper Mehdi Khalil, who he coached as manager of the Lebanon national team. Radulović left Isfahan following the COVID-19 pandemic, and did not return to Iran; he was replaced by Croatian coach Luka Bonačić.

=== Montenegro ===
On 28 December 2020, Radulović was appointed head coach of the Montenegro national team ahead of the 2022 FIFA World Cup qualifiers. His tenure with his country's national team ended in December 2023 after Montenegro failed to qualify for the UEFA Euro 2024.

=== Return to Lebanon ===
On 11 December 2023, a few days after his resignation as coach of Montenegro, he was re-appointed coach of Lebanon to prepare for the 2023 AFC Asian Cup following the departure of Nikola Jurčević. His contract was terminated on 21 January 2026.

== Career statistics ==
=== Managerial ===
As of match played 26 November 2025

Team	From	To	Record				
Team	From	To	G	W	D	L	Win %
Pakhtakor	1 January 2010	3 May 2010	11	8	1	2	72.73
Budućnost Podgorica	1 July 2011	25 June 2012	37	28	5	4	75.68
Kazma	1 July 2012	31 December 2012	10	2	4	4	20.00
Atyrau	25 December 2012	8 November 2013	33	10	11	12	30.30
Al-Jahra	1 March 2014	30 April 2015	24	15	5	4	62.50
Lebanon	8 May 2015	20 April 2019	37	13	13	11	35.14
Myanmar	20 April 2019	21 October 2019	4	1	0	3	25.00
Zob Ahan	14 January 2020	14 June 2020	5	2	1	2	40.00
Montenegro	29 December 2020	11 December 2023	32	10	8	14	31.25
Lebanon	11 December 2023	26 November 2025	24	11	5	8	45.83
Total			217	100	53	64	46.08

== Honours ==
=== Manager ===
Budućnost Podgorica

- Montenegrin First League: 2011–12
