= Ognjen Rolović =

Montenegrin footballer

Personal information
- Date of birth: 25 August 1993 (age 33)
- Place of birth: Podgorica, FR Yugoslavia (present day Montenegro)
- Height: 1.86 m (6 ft 1 in)
- Position: Forward

Team information
- Current team: Jezero
- Number: 19

Youth career
- 2009–2010: Mornar

Senior career*
Years	Team	Apps	(Gls)
2010–2015	Mladost Podgorica	14	(1)
2012–2013	→ Zabjelo (loan)		
2013–2014	→ Srbija FF (loan)	10	(2)
2015	Kom	12	(0)
2016	Kerċem Ajax	7	(3)
2017–2018	Kerċem Ajax	10	(11)
2018	→ Birkirkara (loan)	8	(3)
2018	Kamza	16	(2)
2019	Saburtalo	34	(8)
2020	Minsk	9	(1)
2020–2021	Dečić	21	(3)
2021	Mornar	12	(1)
2022	Petrovac	9	(1)
2023	Kerċem Ajax	11	(5)
2023–2024	Iskra Danilovgrad	46	(18)
2025	Igalo 1929	14	(6)
2025–	Jezero	33	(6)
- * Club domestic league appearances and goals as of 25 May 2026

Ognjen Rolović (born 25 August 1993) is a Montenegrin footballer who plays as a forward for Jezero in 2. CFL.

== Club career ==
Born in Podgorica, Rolović started his career in his hometown club FK Mladost, making his debut in 2011, against FK Budućnost Podgorica, playing last nine minutes of the game. For the following seasons Rolović was rarely given a chance. He only managed to make 14 appearances for Mladost, scoring a single goal against FK Lovćen in 2012.

In order to gain more playing experience, Rolović first was loaned to third tier side FK Zabjelo and then to lower division Swedish club Srbija FF, where he managed to score 2 goals in 10 appearances.

After loan spells, Rolović left FK Mladost and joined FK Kom, playing in second tier. Before cancelling agreement with the club at the end of 2015, Rolović managed to make 12 appearances for the club, without scoring a goal.

In 2016, Rolović moved to Malta and signed a deal with Kerċem Ajax, where he spent six months, before leaving the club at the end of November. However, in the second half of 2017, Rolovic again returned to the club and some successful performances led to his loan move to Birkirkara in 2018.

In 2018, Rolović moved to Albanian Superliga club FC Kamza. He made his debut against FK Tirana. He managed to score two goals in 16 appearances for the first part of the season, before leaving the club in December.

In 2019, Rolović joined Saburtalo Tbilisi, scoring the first ever goal for the club in European competitions, against Sheriff Tiraspol in UEFA Champions League qualifying.

In March 2020, Rolović signed for Belarusian team Minsk. He made nine appearances, scoring one goal. On 22 June, the club announced that Rolovic had left the club.
