= Milorad Dabić =

Serbian footballer

Personal information
- Full name: Milorad Dabić
- Date of birth: 1 May 1991 (age 35)
- Place of birth: Belgrade, SFR Yugoslavia
- Height: 1.83 m (6 ft 0 in)
- Position: Centre forward

Senior career*
Years	Team	Apps	(Gls)
2008–2010	Zlatibor Čajetina		
2010–2012	Zeta	34	(1)
2013	Sopot	23	(2)
2014	Hajduk Beograd	10	(1)
2014–2015	Žarkovo	25	(7)
2015–2017	Rad	14	(2)
2017	→ Sinđelić Beograd (loan)	5	(0)
2017	MFK Vyškov	6	(3)
2017	1. HFK Olomouc	12	(4)
2018–2019	Budućnost Dobanovci	13	(0)
2019-2021	Sloboda Užice		
- * Club domestic league appearances and goals as of 14 September 2017

Milorad Dabić (Serbian Cyrillic: Милорад Дабић; born 1 May 1991) is a Serbian footballer who plays as a forward.

== Career ==
Born in Belgrade, Dabić started his career playing for Zlatibor Čajetina. After two years with Zeta, he stayed with Sopot for a year. Next he played for Hajduk Beograd until the end of 2013–14. After season with Žarkovo which he ended with 25 matches and 7 goals, he joined Serbian SuperLiga club Rad in summer 2015.

== Career statistics ==
As of 9 October 2015

Club performance			League		Cup		Continental		Total	
Season	Club	League	Apps	Goals	Apps	Goals	Apps	Goals	Apps	Goals
Season	Montenegro		League		Montenegrin		Europe		Total	
2010–11	Zeta	Montenegrin First League	5	0	1	0	0	0	6	0
2011–12	Zeta	Montenegrin First League	20	1	2	0	1	1	23	2
2012–13	Zeta	Montenegrin First League	9	0	1	0	2	0	12	0
2012–13	Serbia		League		Serbian		Europe		Total	
2012–13	Sopot	Serbian League Belgrade	13	1	0	0	0	0	13	1
2013–14	Sopot	Serbian League Belgrade	10	1	0	0	0	0	10	1
2013–14	Hajduk Beograd	Serbian League Belgrade	10	1	0	0	0	0	10	1
2014–15	Žarkovo	Serbian League Belgrade	25	7	0	0	0	0	25	7
2015–16	Rad	Serbian SuperLiga	9	2	0	0	0	0	9	2
Total	Montenegro		34	1	4	0	3	1	41	2
Total	Serbia		67	12	0	0	0	0	67	12
Career total			101	13	4	0	3	1	108	14
