= Ivica Jovanović =

Serbian footballer

Personal information
- Date of birth: 4 December 1987 (age 38)
- Place of birth: Zaječar, SFR Yugoslavia
- Height: 1.85 m (6 ft 1 in)
- Position: Striker

Team information
- Current team: Timočanin

Youth career
- Timok

Senior career*
Years	Team	Apps	(Gls)
2004–2005	Timok		
2006	Lokeren	1	(0)
2008–2009	Rudar Pljevlja	10	(0)
2009–2010	Mladi Radnik	6	(0)
2010–2012	Rudar Pljevlja	60	(30)
2012–2015	OFK Beograd	79	(22)
2013	→ Radnički Niš (loan)	8	(0)
2016	Rad	16	(0)
2016–2017	Metalac Gornji Milanovac	21	(5)
2017	Vikingur Reykjavik	6	(1)
2017	Vojvodina	11	(1)
2018–2020	Trayal Kruševac	72	(17)
2021	OFK Beograd		
2021	Timok	18	(3)
2022–	Timočanin		
- * Club domestic league appearances and goals as of 6 October 2021

Ivica Jovanović (Serbian Cyrillic: Ивица Јовановић; born 4 December 1987) is a Serbian football striker who plays for Timočanin.

== Club career ==
Born in Zaječar, he begin playing with FK Timok in the 2003–04 Second League of Serbia and Montenegro, and he later spent some seasons in Belgium playing with KSC Lokeren. In 2008, he joined Montenegrin team FK Rudar Pljevlja but a year later he moved to FK Mladi Radnik and played with them in the 2009–10 Serbian SuperLiga. At the end of the season he returned to Rudar and this time, in his second spell in the club, he ended up being one of the most used players and helped the club win the 2010–11 Montenegrin Cup. In the following season he contributed with 17 goals for Rudar to achieve the second place in the 2011–12 Montenegrin First League, while in the Cup they reached the final but this time they lost against FK Čelik Nikšić by 2–1 with Jovanović scoring Rudar's goal at that final. He still played with Rudar during their 2012–13 UEFA Europa League campaign (a defeat against Shirak FC in the first qualifying round) however his impressive goalscoring statistics at those two seasons in the Montenegrin First League made him become one of OFK Beograd last signings during the 2012 summer transfer window. He made his debut with OFK in the 2012–13 Serbian SuperLiga on 2 September 2012, in a home match against Serbian title holders, FK Partizan.

On 23 August 2017, Jovanović signed a two-year deal with Vojvodina.
