= Nedeljko Vlahović =

Montenegrin footballer

Neđeljko Vlahović
Personal information
- Full name: Neđeljko Vlahović
- Date of birth: 15 January 1984 (age 42)
- Place of birth: Titograd, SFR Yugoslavia
- Height: 1.73 m (5 ft 8 in)
- Position: Midfielder

Team information
- Current team: Kom

Senior career*
Years	Team	Apps	(Gls)
2003–2005	Kom	28	(5)
2005–2006	Zora	30	(3)
2006–2009	Kom	64	(8)
2007	→ Budućnost Podgorica (loan)	11	(1)
2009–2016	Rudar Pljevlja	181	(27)
2016–2017	Radnik Surdulica	17	(0)
2017	Mladost Podgorica	11	(1)
2018	Grbalj	24	(1)
2019–2021	Kom	37	(5)

International career
2007	Montenegro	1	(0)
- * Club domestic league appearances and goals as of 22 November 2023

Neđeljko Vlahović (Cyrillic: Недељко Влаховић; born 15 January 1984) is a Montenegrin football coach who is in charge of Rudar Pljevlja, and a former professional footballer who played as a midfielder, more recently for Kom.

== Club career ==
Born in the Montenegrin capital Titograd (now Podgorica), he played with FK Kom, FK Zora and FK Budućnost Podgorica before joining FK Rudar Pljevlja and playing with them as captain 7 consecutive seasons in the Montenegrin First League. After making 5 appearances with Rudar in the 2016–17 Montenegrin First League, in the last day of the summer transfers window, he left Rudar and moved for first time abroad in his career, by joining Serbian SuperLiga side FK Radnik Surdulica.

On 15 February 2019, Vlahović returned to Kom.

== International career ==
Vlahović has made one appearance for the Montenegro national football team, an August 2007 friendly match against Slovenia in which he came on as a late substitute for Branko Bošković.

== Honours ==
Rudar Pljevlja

- Montenegrin First League: 2009–10, 2014–15
- Montenegrin Cup: 2010, 2011, 2016
