= Miodrag Karadžić =

Montenegrin footballer

Personal information
- Full name: Miodrag Karadžić
- Date of birth: 20 January 1987 (age 39)
- Place of birth: Žabljak, Yugoslavia
- Height: 1.83 m (6 ft 0 in)
- Position: Midfielder

Team information
- Current team: Pljevlja 1997

Senior career*
Years	Team	Apps	(Gls)
2008–2009	Rudar Pljevlja	2	(0)
2009–2010	Kom	5	(1)
2010-2011	Laçi	18	(0)
2014	Pljevlja 1997	0	(0)
2015	Igalo		
2016–	Pljevlja 1997		
- * Club domestic league appearances and goals as of 16 February 2015

Miodrag Karadžić (Serbian Cyrillic: Миодраг Караџић; born 20 January 1987) is a Montenegrin footballer who plays for Pljevlja 1997.
