= Denis Fetahović =

Montenegrin footballer

Personal information
- Full name: Denis Fetahović
- Date of birth: 29 December 1979 (age 46)
- Place of birth: Nikšić, SFR Yugoslavia
- Height: 1.76 m (5 ft 9 1/2 in)
- Position: Defender

Senior career*
| Years | Team | Apps | (Gls) |
| 2001–2005 | Sutjeska | 80 | |
| 2005–2007 | Javor Ivanjica | 38 | (2) |
| 2007–2008 | Bokelj | 13 | (0) |
| 2008– | Jedinstvo BP | 48 | (0) |
- * Club domestic league appearances and goals as of 23 March 2012

Denis Fetahović (Cyrillic: Дeниc Фeтaxoвић; born 29 December 1979) is a Montenegrin retired football defender who last played for FK Jedinstvo Bijelo Polje.

== Club career ==
Born in Nikšić, he has been a regular player in the First League of Serbia and Montenegro, first playing four seasons with his home-town side FK Sutjeska, and, afterwards, with Serbian FK Javor Ivanjica during the 2005–06 season. After the relegation of Javor to the Second league in 2006, he stayed another season in Ivanjica before returning to Montenegro in summer 2007 to continue his career with FK Bokelj. In 2008, he signed with FK Jedinstvo Bijelo Polje playing in the Montenegrin First League.
