= Boris Došljak =

Montenegrin footballer

Personal information
- Date of birth: 4 June 1989 (age 37)
- Place of birth: Titograd, SFR Yugoslavia
- Height: 1.77 m (5 ft 10 in)
- Positions: Midfielder; winger

Team information
- Current team: Mladost DG
- Number: 21

Youth career
- FK Zabjelo

Senior career*
| Years | Team | Apps | (Gls) |
| 2008−2014 | FK Zeta | 142 | (19) |
| 2014−2015 | Widzew Łódź | 4 | (0) |
| 2015 | FK Sloboda Užice | 14 | (1) |
| 2015−2016 | FK Bokelj | 16 | (2) |
| 2016 | FK Lovćen | 22 | (1) |
| 2017 | Sloboda Užice | 14 | (3) |
| 2017 | Iskra Danilovgrad | 15 | (4) |
| 2017−2022 | KÍ | 88 | (16) |
| 2022−2023 | Arsenal Tivat | 51 | (14) |
| 2023− | Mladost DG | 29 | (4) |
- * Club domestic league appearances and goals as of 4 June 2024

Boris Došljak (born 4 June 1989) is a Montenegrin professional footballer who plays for Montenegrin First League club Mladost DG.

== Career ==
Dosljak started his senior career with FK Zeta. After a stint with Widzew Łódź, he signed for FK Sloboda Užice in the Serbian First League in 2015, where he made fourteen league appearances and scored one goal. After that, he played for FK Bokelj, FK Lovćen, Sloboda Užice, FK Iskra Danilovgrad, and KÍ Klaksvík. In January 2022, Došljak returned to Montenegro where he signed with Arsenal Tivat.

Došljak has two sons, Jakov and Simon.

== Honours ==
KÍ

- Faroe Islands Premier League: 2019, 2021
- Faroe Islands Super Cup: 2020
