= Fetim Kasapi =

Albanian footballer (born 1983)

Personal information
- Date of birth: 19 May 1983 (age 43)
- Place of birth: Peć, SFR Yugoslavia
- Height: 1.75 m (5 ft 9 in)
- Position: Midfielder

Senior career*
Years	Team	Apps	(Gls)
2001–2007	Besa Pejë		
2008	Budućnost Podgorica		
2008–2009	Otrant Ulcinj		
2009	Vllaznia Shkodër	6	(1)
2010	Besa Pejë		
2011	Mornar Bar	11	(1)
2011	Jedinstvo Bijelo Polje		
2012–2013	Čelik Nikšić	13	(3)
2013	Trepça '89		
2014	Dečić	10	(2)
2014	Råslätts	4	(0)
2015–2020	Besa Pejë		
- * Club domestic league appearances and goals as of 5 August 2014

Fetim Kasapi (born 19 May 1983) is an Albanian football midfielder.

== Club career ==
Born in Peć Serbia, he started playing in the local club Besa Pejë in 2000. During the winter break of the 2007–08 season, he signed with Montenegrin First League side FK Budućnost Podgorica which won the double that season. In summer 2008, he moved to FK Otrant which at that time was playing in the Montenegrin Second League. In summer 2009 he moved to Albanian Superliga side KS Vllaznia Shkodër, and he played for them in 2009–10 UEFA Europa League.

After his time in Albania, he played for Montenegrin side FK Mornar and he subsequently joined FK Čelik Nikšić in the Montenegrin First League.

After a spell with Swedish side Råslätts, he returned to Kosovo in November 2014 to rejoin hometown club Besa Pejë.

== Honours ==
Besa Pejë

- Kosovo Superleague: 2004–05, 2005–06, 2006–07
- Kosovar Cup: 2004–05, 2015–16

Budućnost Podgorica

- Montenegrin First League: 2007–08
- Montenegrin Cup: 2007–08

Čelik Nikšić

- Montenegrin Cup: 2011–12
- Montenegrin Second League: 2011–12

== External sources ==
- Stats from Montenegro at FSCG.co.me
