= Aleksandar Dubljević =

Montenegrin footballer

Personal information
- Date of birth: 9 March 1985 (age 41)
- Place of birth: Nikšić, SFR Yugoslavia
- Height: 1.86 m (6 ft 1 in)
- Position: Defender

Senior career*
Years	Team	Apps	(Gls)
2003	Sutjeska	1	(0)
2004	Čelik Nikšić	13	(1)
2004–2010	Sutjeska	151	(2)
2010	Inđija	14	(0)
2011	Sutjeska	9	(2)
2011	Čelik Nikšić	9	(0)
2011–2012	Turan Tovuz	7	(0)
2012–2013	Čelik Nikšić	24	(1)
2013	Mornar	32	(1)
2014	Rudar Pljevlja	4	(0)
- * Club domestic league appearances and goals as of 28 January 2015

Aleksandar Dubljević (Cyrillic: Александар Дубљeвић; born 9 March 1985) is a Montenegrin retired football defender.

== Club career ==
Born in Nikšić, he made his senior debut with FK Sutjeska Nikšić in the First League of Serbia and Montenegro in 2003. He had a short spell with another local club, FK Čelik Nikšić, playing in the Second League group South, before rejoining Sutjeska where he would stay the following six seasons.

In summer 2010 he moved to FK Inđija, a newly promoted side in the Serbian SuperLiga, but in the following winter he was back with Sutjeska. In 2011 after a short spell with his former club FK Čelik Nikšić in the Montenegrin Second League, he joined Azerbaijani side Turan Tovuz PFC in the Azerbaijan Premier League. In summer 2012 he was back with now promoted FK Čelik Nikšić having come in time to play in the 2011–12 Montenegrin Cup final in which Čelik has won Rudar by 2–1 with Dubljević scoring the first goal of his team.

== Honours ==
Čelik Nikšić

- Montenegrin Second League: 2011–12
- Montenegrin Cup: 2012
