= Milan Vušurović =

Montenegrin footballer

Personal information
- Date of birth: 18 April 1995 (age 31)
- Place of birth: Cetinje, FR Yugoslavia (now Montenegro)
- Height: 1.82 m (6 ft 0 in)
- Position: Midfielder

Team information
- Current team: Mornar Bar
- Number: 15

Youth career
- Cetinje
- Lovćen

Senior career*
Years	Team	Apps	(Gls)
2012–2015	Lovćen	53	(7)
2015–2017	Budućnost Podgorica	64	(11)
2017–2018	Riga	19	(0)
2018	Vereya	17	(2)
2019	Botev Vratsa	13	(1)
2020	Napredak Kruševac	5	(0)
2020–2021	Radnik Bijeljina	20	(4)
2021–2022	Borac Banja Luka	25	(5)
2022–2023	Al-Orobah	3	(0)
2023	FK Dečić	28	(4)
2024–	Mornar Bar	52	(7)
2025–	Budućnost Podgorica	29	(1)

International career
2013	Montenegro U19	3	(1)
2015–2016	Montenegro U21	10	(0)
- * Club domestic league appearances and goals as of 17 June 2026

Milan Vušurović (born 18 April 1995) is a Montenegrin professional footballer who plays as a midfielder for Budućnost Podgorica.

== Career ==
On 7 July 2022, Vušurović joined Saudi Arabian club Al-Orobah.

== Honours ==
Lovćen

- Montenegrin Cup: 2013–14

Budućnost Podgorica

- Montenegrin First League: 2016–17
