= Gus Kasapis =

American gridiron football player (born 1942)

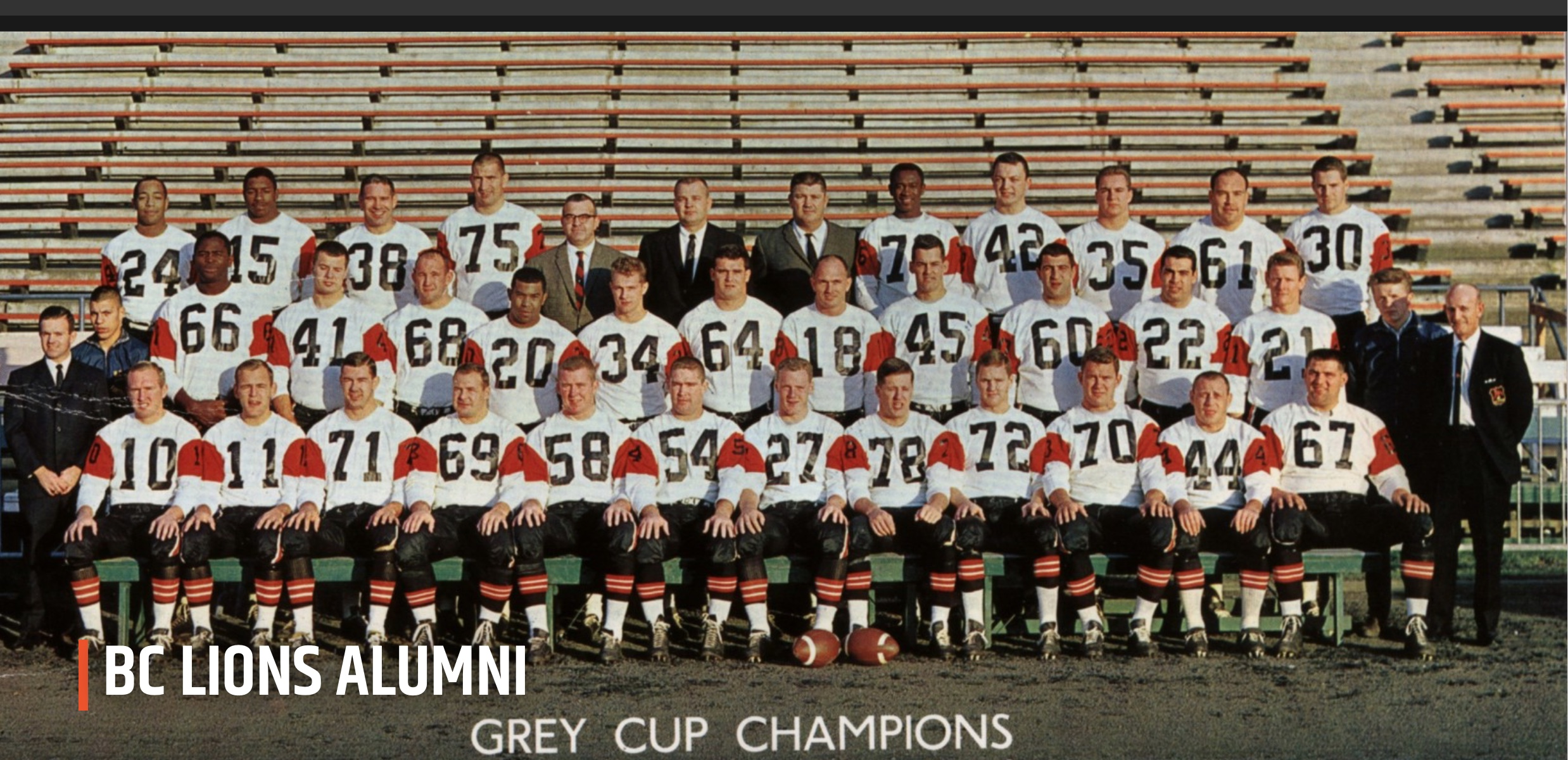
- 1964 Grey Cup Champions BC Lions

Profile
- Position: Defensive tackle

Personal information
- Born: March 18, 1942 (age 84); Detroit, Michigan, U.S.
- Listed height: 6 ft 4 in (1.93 m)
- Listed weight: 255 lb (116 kg)

Career information
- College: Iowa

Career history
- 1964–1965: BC Lions
- 1966: Calgary Stampeders
- 1966–1967: Edmonton Eskimos

Awards and highlights
- Grey Cup champion (1964)

Constantinos Gus Kasapis (born March 18, 1942) is an American former professional football player who played for the BC Lions, Edmonton Eskimos and Calgary Stampeders. He won the Grey Cup with the Lions in 1964. He played college football at the University of Iowa.
