= Nenad Jovanović (footballer, born 1988) =

Serbian footballer

Personal information
- Date of birth: 12 May 1988 (age 38)
- Place of birth: Belgrade, SFR Yugoslavia
- Height: 1.85 m (6 ft 1 in)
- Position: Right wing

Team information
- Current team: OFK Beograd

Senior career*
Years	Team	Apps	(Gls)
2005–2006	Polet Beograd		
2006–2007	Trudbenik		
2007–2008	Šumadija Jagnjilo	29	(3)
2008	Makedonija Gjorče Petrov	3	(0)
2009	Napredok	5	(0)
2009–2010	Shkëndija		
2010–2012	Petrovac	62	(19)
2013	BSK Borča	10	(1)
2013	Mačva Šabac	0	(0)
2014	BSK Borča	0	(0)
2014–2016	Inđija	65	(7)
2017–2020	Mačva Šabac	101	(4)
2020–2021	Žarkovo	27	(2)
2021–	OFK Beograd	0	(0)
- * Club domestic league appearances and goals as of 9 May 2021

Nenad Jovanović (Serbian Cyrillic: Ненад Јовановић; born 12 May 1988) is a Serbian football midfielder who plays for OFK Beograd.
