= Igor Lambulić =

Montenegrin footballer

Personal information
- Date of birth: 21 September 1988 (age 38)
- Place of birth: Titograd, SFR Yugoslavia
- Height: 1.86 m (6 ft 1 in)
- Position: Forward

Youth career
- Zeta

Senior career*
Years	Team	Apps	(Gls)
2005–2006	Zeta	1	(0)
2006–2007	Pontevedra		
2007	Beroe Stara Zagora	8	(3)
2008	Valdevez	9	(4)
2008	Grbalj	3	(0)
2009	Rudar Pljevlja	14	(2)
2009	Kaposvár Rákóczi	1	(0)
2010–2011	Zeta	7	(1)
2011	BSK Borča	0	(0)
2012	Čukarički Stankom	4	(0)
2014–2015	Slavija Sarajevo	27	(3)
2015	Dečić	0	(0)
- * Club domestic league appearances and goals

Igor Lambulić (Cyrillic: Игop Лaмбулић, born 21 September 1988) is a Montenegrin former professional footballer who played as a forward.

Now he is the owner of the football management agency Lamfoot international.

== Club career ==
Born in Titograd (currently known as Podgorica, Montenegro), he played for Montenegrin club Zeta, Spanish team Pontevedra, Portuguese team Valdevez, Bulgarian club Beroe Stara Zagora, Hungarian club Kaposvár Rákóczi and Serbian SuperLiga side BSK Borča. During the second half of the 2011–12 season and the first half of 2012–13 season he was with FK Čukarički in the Serbian First League. In the winter break of 2013–14 season he joined FK Slavija.
