= FK Polimlje Murino =

Fk Polimlje
- Full name: Fudbalski klub Polimlje
- Founded: 1934; 92 years ago
- Ground: Stadion u Murinu; Murino, Montenegro
- Capacity: 100
- Manager: Zoran Basekić
- League: Third League
Home colours

Fudbalski klub Polimlje (English: Football Club Polimlje Murino) is a football club from Murino, a town between Andrijevica and Plav, Montenegro. They currently compete in the Montenegrin Third League.

== History ==
FK Polimlje was founded in 1934, but they played only non-league games before World War II.
The club's official performances in domestic competitions started during the seventies, when FK Polimlje became a member of the Montenegrin Fourth league. They spent two decades in regional competition and first significant success came in the 1994–95 season. FK Polimlje won the title of the Fourth league - North champion and gained its historical, first-ever promotion to the Montenegrin Republic League. They played two consecutive seasons in the Republic tier before relegation after the 1996–97 season.
New significant result FK Polimlje made in the 1998–99 season, finishing first in the Fourth league - North, with another promotion to the highest rank. This time, they were relegated after one season, finishing 13th on the table, but only one point less than neighbouring FK Jezero who remained member of the third-tier.
Since that era, FK Polimlje never again played in higher rank and following Montenegrin independence, FK Polimlje became a part of the Montenegrin Third League - North.
Two times FK Polimlje won the title of the Third League - North winner. But both times, they didn't succeed in gaining promotion to the Montenegrin Second League, after defeats in the playoffs. Firstly, they failed to qualify in the 2007–08 season after the playoff games against FK Ribnica (0–2; 2-2) and FK Mornar (2-2; 2–3). Second title, FK Polimlje won in the 2015–16 season, but this time failed to qualify for higher-rank after the playoff games against FK Čelik (0–2; 0–7) and FK Otrant (2–3; 2-2).

== Honours and achievements ==
- Montenegrin Third League – 2
  - winners (2): 2007–08, 2015–16
- Montenegrin Fourth League – 2
  - winners (2): 1994–95, 1998–99
- Northern Region Cup – 0
  - runners-up (3): 2010, 2011, 2014

== Current squad ==
Note: Flags indicate national team as defined under FIFA eligibility rules; some limited exceptions apply. Players may hold more than one non-FIFA nationality.

No.	Pos.	Nation	Player
—	GK	MNE	Velimir Komatina
—	GK	MNE	Miloš Otašević
—	DF	MNE	Damjan Otašević
—	DF	MNE	Bogoljub Komatina
—	DF	MNE	Milivoje Tomović
—	DF	MNE	Nemanja Stešević
—	DF	MNE	Saša Laban
—	MF	MNE	Tihomir Milović

No.	Pos.	Nation	Player
—	MF	MNE	Bojan Otašević
—	MF	MNE	Nikodin Fatić
—	MF	MNE	Ivan Šoškić
—	MF	MNE	Bogoslav Jokić
—	FW	SRB	Đorđije Kočanović
—	FW	MNE	Bojan Jokanović
—	FW	MNE	Ervin Barjaktarević
—	FW	PAN	Jan Janio

== Stadium ==
FK Polimlje plays their home games at Stadion u Murinu in Andrijevica. The stadium doesn't meet criteria for any higher rank then the Montenegrin Third League.

== See also ==
- Plav, Montenegro
- Montenegrin Third League
- Montenegrin clubs in Yugoslav football competitions (1946–2006)
