= Saša Jovanović (footballer, born 1988) =

Serbian footballer

Personal information
- Date of birth: 12 January 1988 (age 38)
- Place of birth: SFR Yugoslavia
- Height: 1.95 m (6 ft 5 in)
- Position: Centre forward

Senior career*
Years	Team	Apps	(Gls)
2007–2010	Metalac GM	18	(1)
2010	Teleoptik	4	(0)
2011	Jedinstvo Bijelo Polje	2	(0)
2011–2012	OFK Bar		
2012–2013	Partizan Bumbarevo Brdo		
2013–2014	Jezero Plav		
2014	Ibar Rožaje		
2014	Mosta	8	(1)
2015	Metalac GM		
2015	ASV Spratzern	0	(0)
- * Club domestic league appearances and goals as of 13 September 2014

Saša Jovanović (Serbian Cyrillic: Саша Јовановић; born 12 January 1988) is a Serbian football forward who played in Malta for Mosta.
