= Stadion u Murinu =

Football stadium in Montenegro

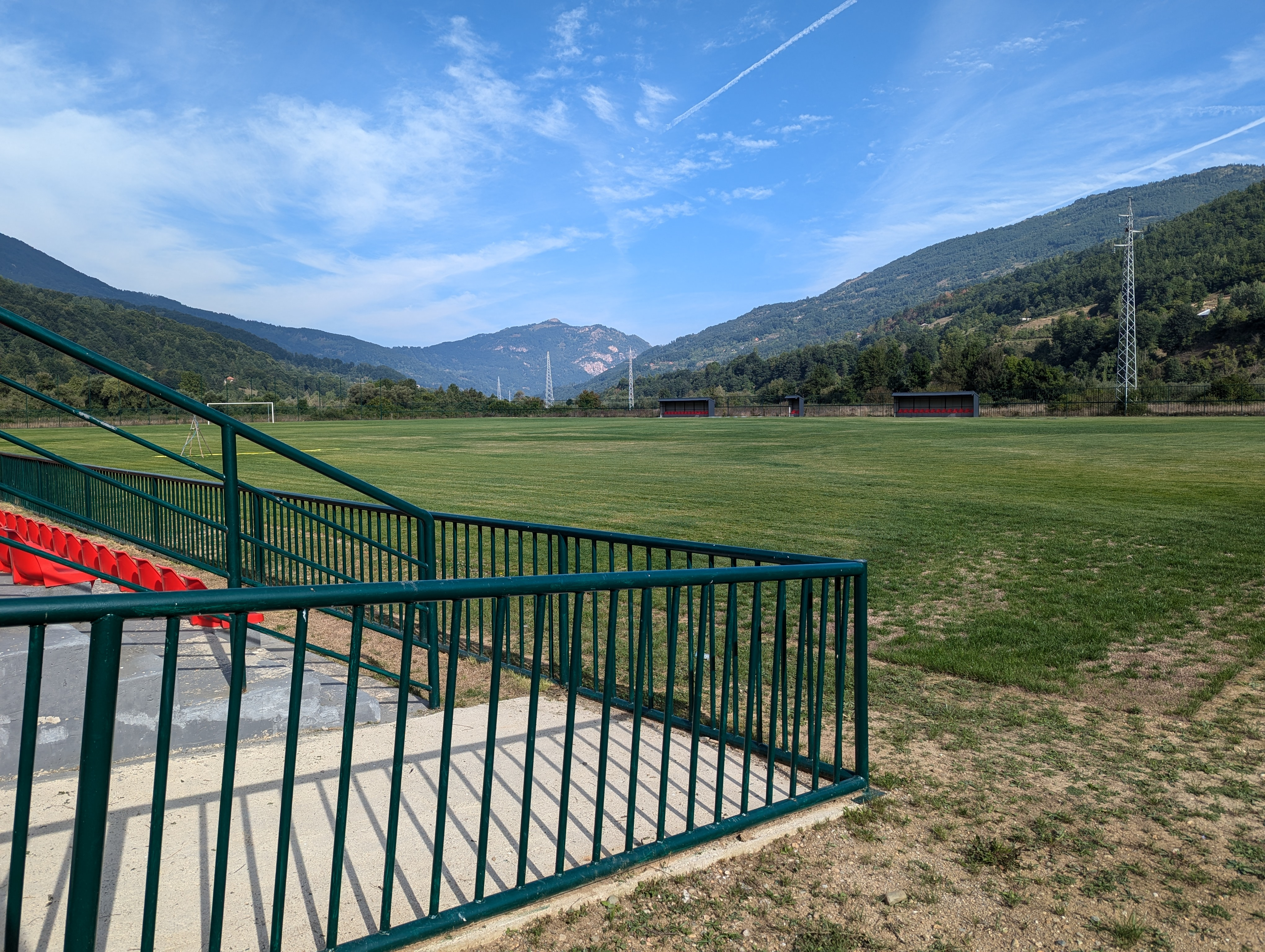
- Interactive map of Stadion u Murinu
- Full name: Stadion Lugovi Murino
- Location: Murino, Plav Municipality, Montenegro
- Coordinates: 42.665186°N 19.880219°E
- Owner: Municipality of Plav
- Capacity: 100
- Surface: grass
- Field size: 110x70

Construction
- Built: 1994

Tenant
- Polimlje

Stadion u Murinu, or Stadion Lugovi, is a football stadium in Murino, Plav Municipality, Montenegro. Situated in the valley of Lim river, it is used for football matches. It is the home ground of FK Polimlje.

== History ==
FK Polimlje played their games during the decades at the bank of Lim river. But, during the first half of the nineties, a new pitch was built with fences, offices and dressing rooms. The stadium has no stands and doesn't meet criteria for any league competitions except the bottom rank.

== Pitch and conditions ==
The pitch measures 110 x 70 meters. The stadium meet criteria only for Montenegrin Third League games, not for highest-rank competitions.

== See also ==
- FK Polimlje Murino
- Murino
- Plav, Montenegro
