= Nenad Stojanović =

Serbian football player

Personal information
- Date of birth: 22 October 1979 (age 47)
- Place of birth: Belgrade, SFR Yugoslavia
- Height: 1.89 m (6 ft 2 in)
- Position: Striker

Youth career
- Red Star Belgrade

Senior career*
| Years | Team | Apps | (Gls) |
| 1998–2005 | Red Star Belgrade | 26 | (9) |
| 1998–1999 | → Železnik (loan) | 7 | (0) |
| 2001 | → Mladost Apatin (loan) | 1 | (0) |
| 2002 | → Jedinstvo Ub (loan) | 14 | (10) |
| 2002–2003 | → Leotar (loan) | 23 | (22) |
| 2005–2006 | Genk | 33 | (11) |
| 2006–2007 | Brussels | 12 | (1) |
| 2007–2008 | Luch Vladivostok | 12 | (0) |
| 2008–2009 | Vojvodina | 8 | (2) |
| 2009–2010 | Javor Ivanjica | 16 | (1) |
| 2010–2011 | Leotar | 20 | (5) |
| 2011–2012 | Rudar Pljevlja | 28 | (9) |
| 2012 | Simurq | 13 | (0) |
| 2013 | Rudar Pljevlja | 15 | (5) |
| 2013–2014 | Lovćen | 12 | (4) |
| 2014 | Leotar | 11 | (1) |
| 2015 | Brodarac 1947 | 9 | (3) |
| 2015–2016 | IMT | 24 | (4) |
| 2016–2017 | Žarkovo | 22 | (4) |
| 2018–2019 | Leštane | | |
| Total | | 306 | (91) |
- * Club domestic league appearances and goals

Nenad "Purke" Stojanović (Serbian Cyrillic: Ненад Пурке Стојановић; born 22 October 1979) is a Serbian former professional footballer who played as a striker.

== Career ==
After coming through the youth categories of Red Star Belgrade, Stojanović went on numerous loans, having a breakthrough season at Bosnian club Leotar in 2002–03. He was the team's top scorer with 22 goals in 23 league games, helping them win their first national title in history. Following his return to Red Star, Stojanović played mostly as a substitute and scored several crucial goals in the 2003–04 season, helping the side win the championship.

In January 2005, Stojanović was transferred to Belgian club Genk, signing a three-and-a-half-year contract. He also played for Brussels, before moving to Russian club Luch Vladivostok in early 2007. In the summer of 2008, Stojanović returned to Serbia and joined Vojvodina.

In July 2018, aged 38, Stojanović agreed terms with Belgrade Zone League side Leštane. He previously played for Brodarac 1947 (Spring 2015), IMT (2015–16), and Žarkovo (2016–17) in the Serbian League Belgrade.

== Honours ==
Leotar

- Premier League of Bosnia and Herzegovina: 2002–03

Red Star Belgrade

- First League of Serbia and Montenegro: 2003–04
- Serbia and Montenegro Cup: 2003–04
