= Zabjelo Stadium =

Football stadium in Podgorica, Montenegro

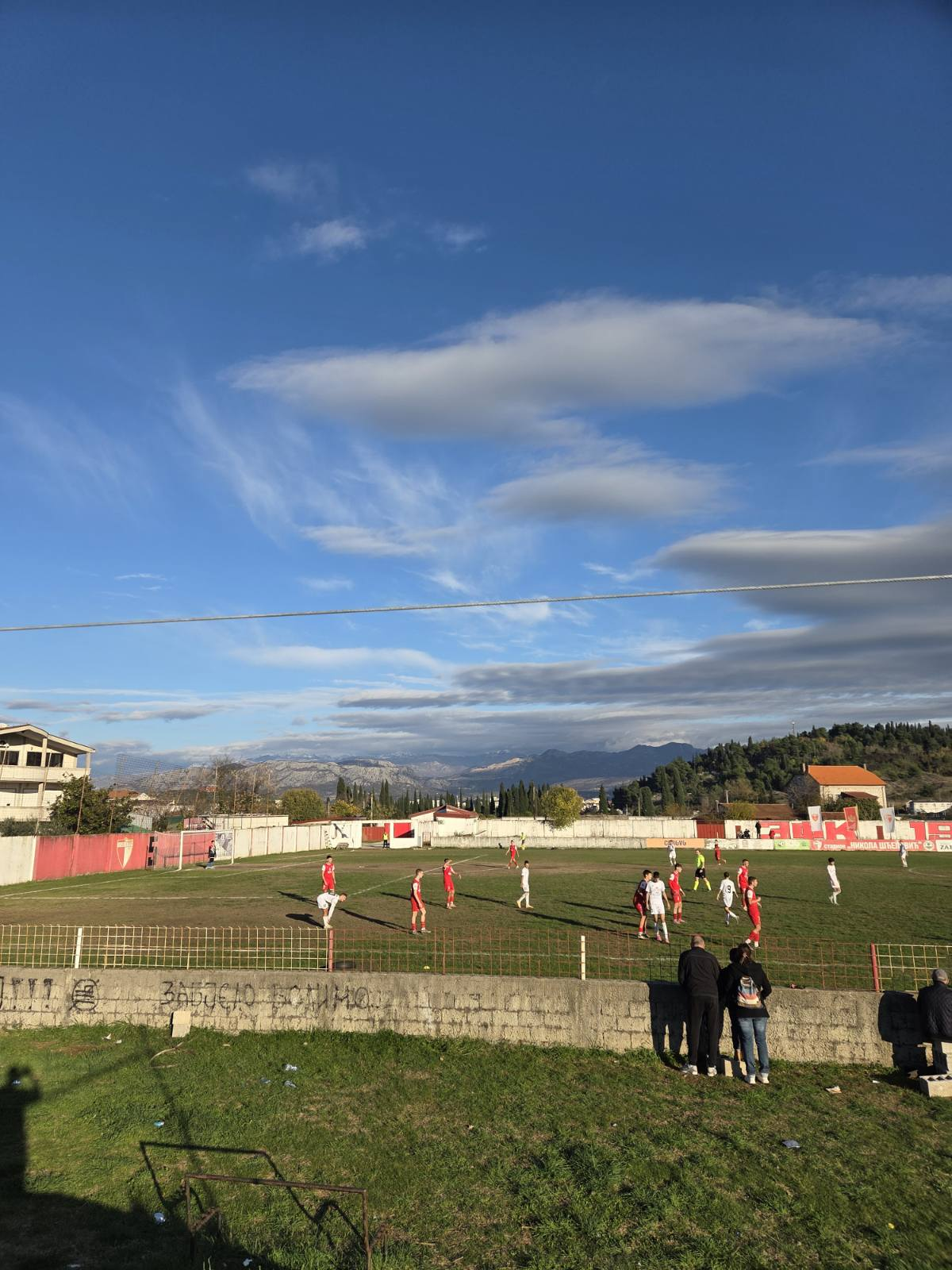
- Interactive map of Zabjelo Stadium
- Full name: Stadion Nikola Šćepović
- Location: Podgorica, Montenegro
- Coordinates: 42.431782°N 19.244467°E
- Owner: City of Podgorica
- Capacity: 750
- Surface: grass
- Field size: 105x65

Construction
- Built: 1973

Tenant
- FK Zabjelo

Stadion Nikola Šćepović, known as Zabjelo Stadium is a football stadium in Podgorica, Montenegro. It is situated in the Zabjelo neighbourhood, near the Morača riverbank. It is used for football matches and is the home ground of FK Zabjelo.

== History ==
Zabjelo Stadium was built in 1973, as a home ground of FK Zabjelo. Through the decades, on stadium were built small stands, with the overall capacity of 750 seats.
Historical highest attendance on Zabjelo Stadium was recorded on 2003 with 3,000 spectators on a game FK Zabjelo - FK Budućnost (1:1),
Tenant of stadium, FK Zabjelo, revealed plans for reconstruction of the stadium, which will have a proposed capacity of 10,000 seats.

In December 2022. stadium was renamed in Stadion Nikola Šćepović, in memory of the former captain Nikola Šćepović who died in 2016. from a heart attack at the age 20.

== Pitch and conditions ==
The pitch measures 105 x 65 meters. The stadium didn't met UEFA criteria for European competitions.
In addition to the main field was an auxiliary field, but it was destroyed during 2004.

== See also ==
- FK Zabjelo
- Podgorica
