= Ljajkovići =

Ljajkovići Љајковићи
- Village
- Location within Montenegro
- Country: Montenegro
- Municipality: Podgorica

Population (2011)
  - Total: 486
- Time zone: UTC+1 (CET)
  - Summer (DST): UTC+2 (CEST)

Ljajkovići (Montenegrin: Љајковићи) is a village in the new Zeta Municipality of Montenegro. Until 2022, it was part of Podgorica Municipality.

== Demographics ==
According to the 2011 census, its population was 486.

Ethnicity in 2011
Ethnicity	Number	Percentage
Montenegrins	379	78.0%
Serbs	77	15.8%
other/undeclared	30	6.2%
Total	486	100%
