= Murino, Plav =

Murino Муринo
- Village
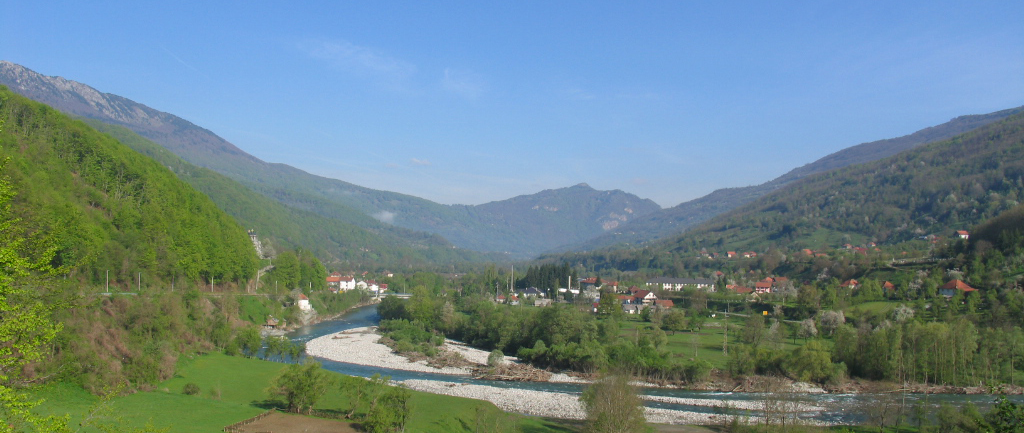

- Location within Montenegro
- Coordinates: 42.661890°N 19.885682°E
- Country: Montenegro
- Municipality: Plav

Population (2011)
  - Total: 462
- Time zone: UTC+1 (CET)
  - Summer (DST): UTC+2 (CEST)

Murino (Serbian Cyrillic: Муринo) is a village in the municipality of Plav, Montenegro.

== Demographics ==
According to the 2011 census, its population was 462.

Ethnicity in 2011
Ethnicity	Number	Percentage
Serbs	293	63.4%
Montenegrins	145	31.4%
Albanians	12	2.6%
other/undeclared	12	2.6%
Total	462	100%

== History ==
Murino was bombed by NATO aviation forces as part of the bombing campaign against the SR Yugoslavia. The NATO forces killed six civilians, including three children. Forty people were seriously injured.

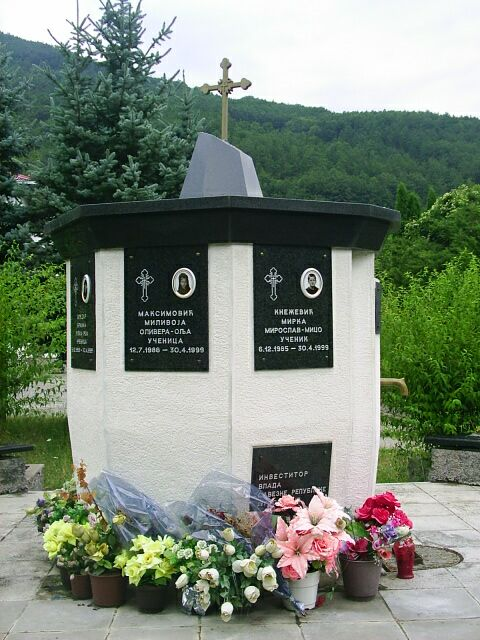
Memorial to those killed in the NATO bombing.
